= List of Wesleyan University people =

== Alumni ==
=== Balzan Prize winners ===
- Charles Coulston Gillispie (1940) – 1997 Balzan Prize; George Sarton Medal; Pfizer Award; professor, history of science, Emeritus, Princeton University
- Russell J. Hemley (1977) – physicist; 2005 Balzan Prize (with Ho-Kwang Mao); director, Carnegie Institution for Science; National Academy of Sciences

=== Pulitzer Prizes ===
- Ethan Bronner (1976) – Pulitzer Prize (Explanatory Journalism, 2001); Battle for Justice (The New York Public Library, one of the 25 best books of 1989)
- Lisa Chedekel (1982) – Pulitzer Prize for Breaking News Reporting (1999); finalist, Pulitzer (2007); George Polk Award; Selden Ring Award for Investigative Reporting; Worth Bingham Prize
- David Garrow (1975) – Pulitzer Prize for Biography (1987); Fellow, Homerton College, Cambridge University
- Alan C. Miller (1976) – Pulitzer Prize for National Reporting (2003), Goldsmith Prize for Investigative Reporting (1997), George Polk Award (1996)
- Lin-Manuel Miranda (2002) – playwright, winner of Pulitzer Prize for Drama (2016) for Hamilton
- Stephen Schiff (1972) – journalist; finalist, Pulitzer Prize for Criticism (1983)
- Wadada Leo Smith – composer, musician; finalist, Pulitzer Prize for Music (2013)
- Leland Stowe (1921) – Pulitzer Prize (Correspondence, 1930); runner-up for second Pulitzer (Correspondence, 1940)

=== MacArthur Fellows ===
The following alumni are fellows of the MacArthur Fellows Program (known as the "genius grant") from the John D. and Catherine T. MacArthur Foundation. As this is an interdisciplinary award, recipients are listed here in addition to their listing in their field of accomplishment.

- Ruth Behar (1977–88) – first Latin woman named a MacArthur Fellow; professor, anthropology, University of Michigan; poet, writer
- Majora Carter (1984–2005) – MacArthur Fellow; environmental justice advocate; urban revitalization strategist; public radio host; 2011 Peabody award
- Mary Halvorson – 2019 MacArthur Fellow; avant-garde jazz composer and guitarist
- James Longley (1994–2009) – MacArthur Fellow; documentarian, including Gaza Strip, Iraq in Fragments, Sari's Mother
- Lin-Manuel Miranda – 2015 MacArthur Fellow; Broadway actor, composer, playwright, and lyricist (In the Heights, Hamilton); 2008 Tony Award winner for Best Musical and Best Original Score, 2008 Grammy Award for Best Musical Show Album, 2016 Pulitzer Prize for Drama winner

=== Academy, Emmy, Tony, and Grammy awards ===
==== Academy awards and nominations ====
- Miguel Arteta (1989) – Student Academy Award, Independent Spirit John Cassavetes Award; film director (Chuck & Buck, The Good Girl, Youth in Revolt, Cedar Rapids)
- Shari Springer Berman (1985) – Academy Award-nominated screenwriter, director, American Splendor (Best Adapted Screenplay); The Extra Man, Cinema Verite
- Akiva Goldsman (1983) – Academy Award-winning screenwriter, A Beautiful Mind (2001, Best Adapted Screenplay); Golden Globe Award; The Client, A Time to Kill
- Sebastian Junger (1984) – documentarian; Restrepo; 2011 Academy Award nomination; Grand Jury Prize, Best Documentary, 2010 Sundance Film Festival
- Jennifer Lame (2004) – Academy Award-winning film editor, Oppenheimer (2023, Academy Award for Best Film Editing)
- Kenneth Lonergan – playwright, screenwriter, director; nominated for two Academy Awards (2002, Gangs of New York; 2000, You Can Count on Me) and Pulitzer Prize (2001, The Waverley Gallery); Grand Jury Prize, Best Drama, 2000 Sundance Film Festival (You Can Count on Me)
- James Longley (1994) – documentarian; Student Academy Award (1994); Academy Award-nominated Iraq in Fragments (2007), Academy Award-nominated Sari's Mother (2008); three jury awards, 2006 Sundance Film Festival
- Laurence Mark (1971) – producer, nominated for three Academy Awards: Jerry Maguire, As Good as It Gets, Working Girl; Dreamgirls (won Golden Globe Award for Best Motion Picture – Musical or Comedy); Independent Spirit Award; Julie & Julia
- Paul Weitz (1988) – Academy Award-nominated director, American Pie; About a Boy, Cirque du Freak: The Vampire's Assistant, Little Fockers
- Joss Whedon (1987) – Academy Award-nominated screenwriter, Toy Story; Speed; director, screenwriter, Buffy the Vampire Slayer, Serenity, The Cabin in the Woods, The Avengers
- Allie Wrubel – Academy Award-winning composer, songwriter, Song of the South, song, "Zip-a-Dee-Doo-Dah" (1947, Best Original Song); Songwriters Hall of Fame
- Benh Zeitlin (2004) – filmmaker, composer, director; his Beasts of the Southern Wild garnered four 2012 Academy Award nominations; 2012 Caméra d'Or award, Cannes Film Festival; 2012 Grand Jury Prize, Dramatic, Sundance Film Festival

==== Emmy awards ====
===== Emmy awards in journalism =====
- David Brancaccio (1982) – Emmy Award-winning newscaster and host, NOW on PBS; DuPont-Columbia Award; Peabody Award
- Randall Pinkston (1972) – three-time Emmy Award-winning television journalist; RTNDA Edward R. Murrow Award
- Stephen Talbot (1970) – television reporter, writer, producer for PBS' Frontline; two Emmy Awards, two Peabody Awards; Edward Murrow Award; DuPont-Columbia Award; Edgar Allan Poe Award

===== Emmy awards in film and television =====
- Phil Abraham – Emmy Award-winning film and television cinematographer, director
- Dana Delany (1978) – two Emmy Awards; actress; television shows China Beach, Presidio Med, Desperate Housewives, Body of Proof; films Tombstone, Fly Away Home
- Evan Katz – Emmy Award-winning writer, executive producer of television series 24
- Michael E. Knight (1980) – three Emmy Awards; actor, best known for his role as Tad Martin on All My Children
- David Kohan (1986) – Emmy Award-winning co-creator, executive producer, Will & Grace and Good Morning, Miami
- Jeffrey Lane – five Emmy Awards, Golden Globe, two Peabody Awards, three Writers Guild of America Awards; author, television scriptwriter, film producer
- Alan Levin (1946) – three Emmy Awards; maker of documentaries
- Marc Levin (1973) – three Emmy Awards (1988, 1989, 1999), documentary filmmaker; 1998 Caméra d'Or award, Cannes Film Festival; 1998 Grand Jury Prize, Sundance Film Festival; 1997 DuPont-Columbia Award; founder of Blowback Productions (1988)
- Bruce McKenna (1984) – Emmy Award-winning television and movie producer, writer; Writers Guild Award; The Pacific
- Owen Renfroe – three Emmy Awards; three Directors Guild of America Awards, television soap opera director; former film editor
- Matthew Senreich (1996) – Emmy Award-winning screenwriter, director; producer, Robot Chicken
- Bill Sherman (2002) – Emmy Award-winning composer (2011); current musical director of Sesame Street
- Matthew Weiner (1987) – 2011 Time's "100 Most Influential People in the World"; The Atlantic, one of 21 "Brave Thinkers 2011"; nine Emmy Awards, three Golden Globes; creator, executive producer, writer, Mad Men; screenwriter, supervising producer, The Sopranos
- Joss Whedon (1987) – Emmy Award, Nebula Award, two Hugo Awards; writer, creator, producer, director, Buffy the Vampire Slayer, Angel, Firefly, Dollhouse, Dr. Horrible's Sing-Along Blog
- Bradley Whitford (1981) – Emmy Award-winning actor; television dramas, The West Wing, Studio 60 on the Sunset Strip; films, Billy Madison, The Sisterhood of the Traveling Pants

==== Tony and Grammy awards ====
- Bill Cunliffe (1978) – jazz pianist, composer, arranger; 2009 Grammy Award; won 1989 Thelonious Monk International Jazz Piano Award; won several Down Beat Awards; 2 Emmy nominations; 4 Grammy nominations
- Thomas Kail (1999) – director; Tony Award winner for Hamilton and nominee for In the Heights
- Lin-Manuel Miranda (2002) – creator, composer, lyricist, actor: In the Heights (two Tony Awards, 2008, Best Musical and Best Original Score; Grammy Award, 2009) and Hamilton (three Tony Awards, 2016, Best Musical, Best Book of a Musical, Best Original Score; Grammy Award, 2016)
- Jeffrey Richards (1969) – producer; six Tony Awards; including 2012 Tony Award for Best Revival of a Musical, 2011 The Gershwins' Porgy and Bess (Paulus adaptation); August: Osage County (Pulitzer Prize, five Tony Awards); co-producer, Spring Awakening (three Tony Awards, Grammy Award)
- L. Shankar (PhD) – Tamil Indian virtuoso violinist, composer; professor of music; 1994 Grammy Award; 1996 Grammy nomination
- Frank Wood (1984) – Tony Award-winning actor (Side Man); Angels in America

=== Academia ===
==== Presidents, chancellors, founders ====
See also: Religion for listing of additional college presidents.

- David Allison (B.A. 1859, M.A. 1862) – president, Mount Allison University, Canada (1891–1911); 2nd president, Mount Allison College, Canada (1869–78)
- Joseph Beech (1899) – co-founder, 1st president, West China Union University in Chengtu, West China
- Douglas J. Bennet (1959) – 15th president, Wesleyan (1995–07)
- Anthony S. Caprio (1967) – 5th president, Western New England College (since 1996)
- Joseph Cummings (1840) – 5th president, Wesleyan (1857–75); 5th president, Northwestern University (1881–90); president, predecessor of Syracuse University (Genesee College)
- Joseph Denison (1840) – co-founder, 1st president, Kansas State University (1863–73); president, Baker University (1874–79); 1st president, Blue Mont Central College
- Nicholas Dirks (1972) – 10th chancellor-designate, University of California, Berkeley (effective June 1, 2013); professor, anthropology, history, and dean, faculty of arts and sciences, Columbia University
- Paul Douglass – 6th president, American University (1941–52)
- Gordon P. Eaton (1951) – 12th president, Iowa State University (1986–90)
- Ignatius Alphonso Few (1838) – co-founder and first president, Emory University
- Cyrus David Foss (1854) – 6th president, Wesleyan (1875–80)
- E. K. Fretwell (1944) – president, University at Buffalo (1967–78); 2nd chancellor, University of North Carolina at Charlotte (1979–89); interim president, University of Massachusetts (1991–92); interim president, University of Florida (1998)
- Bishop John W. Gowdy (1897) – president, Anglo-Chinese College, in Fuzhou, China (1904–23); president, Fukien Christian University (1923–27)
- A. LeRoy Greason (1944) – 12th president, Bowdoin College (1981–90)
- William R. Greiner (1955) – 13th president, University at Buffalo (1991–03); also professor, dean, and provost of the University at Buffalo Law School
- Burton Crosby Hallowell – 9th president, Tufts University (1967–76)
- Abram W. Harris – 14th president, Northwestern University (1906–16); 1st president, University of Maine (1896–06); president, Maine State College (1893–96)
- Bishop Erastus Otis Haven (1842) – 2nd president, University of Michigan (1863–69); 6th president, Northwestern University; 2nd chancellor, Syracuse University; overseer, Harvard University
- Clark T. Hinman – 1st president, Northwestern University (1853–54 (death)); president, Albion College (1846–53)
- Francis S. Hoyt (1844) – 1st president, Willamette University (1853–60)
- Harry Burns Hutchins (1870) – 4th president, University of Michigan (1910–20), twice acting president; dean, University of Michigan Law School; organized law department, Cornell University
- Isaac J. Lansing (B.A. 1872, graduate student 1872–73, M.A. 1875) – president, predecessor, Clark Atlanta University (HBCU) (1874–76)
- Gregory Mandel – dean at Temple University Beasley School of Law
- Oliver Marcy (1846) – twice acting president, Northwestern University (1876–81, 1890); established the Northwestern University Museum of Natural History, served as its curator
- Anthony Marx (1981, attended 1977–79) – 18th president, Amherst College (2003–11); president, New York Public Library (2011–)
- William Williams Mather (A.M. 1834) – acting president, Ohio University (1845)
- John McClintock (1834) – 1st president, Drew Theological Seminary (later, Drew University)
- Frank L. McVey (B.A.) – 4th president, University of North Dakota (1909–17); 3rd president, University of Kentucky (1917–40); economist
- Bishop Samuel Sobieski Nelles (1846) – 1st chancellor, president, Victoria University in the University of Toronto, Ontario, Canada (1884–87); president, Victoria College
- John W. North – co-founder, University of Minnesota; founding member of its board of regents (1851–60); wrote university's charter
- Henry S. Noyes (1848) – twice interim president, Northwestern University (1854–56, 1860–67)
- Kennedy Odede (2012); founder of Shining Hope for Communities, Nairobi, Kenya
- Bishop Charles Henry Payne (A.B. 1856, A.M. 1859) – 3rd president, Ohio Wesleyan University (1876–88)
- Humphrey Pickard (B.A. 1839) – 1st president, Mount Allison Wesleyan College, Canada (later known as Mount Allison University) (1862–1869)
- John A. Randall (1881) – 4th president, Rochester Institute of Technology (1922–36)
- Edward Loranus Rice (A.B. 1892, Sc.D. 1927) – acting president, Ohio Wesleyan University (1938–39); biologist; scientific consultant to Clarence Darrow before Scopes Trial
- William North Rice (1865) – three-time acting president, Wesleyan University (1907, 1908–09, 1918); geologist, earned first PhD. in geology granted by Yale University
- B. T. Roberts – founder, predecessor of Roberts Wesleyan College (named in his honor)
- Michael S. Roth (1978) – 16th president, Wesleyan University (since 2007); 8th president, California College of the Arts (2000–07)
- Richard S. Rust (1841) – co-founder, 1st president, Wilberforce University (HBCU); co-founder, Rust College (HBCU) (named in his honor)
- Edwin O. Smith (1893) – acting president, Connecticut Agricultural College (now the University of Connecticut) (1908)
- Harold Syrett (1935) – president of Brooklyn College
- Beverly Daniel Tatum (1975) – 9th president, Spelman College (HBCU) (2002–); acting president, Mount Holyoke College (2002)
- John Hanson Twombly (1843) – 5th president, University of Wisconsin–Madison (1871–74); co-founder, Boston University; overseer, Harvard University
- Joseph Urgo (M.A.) – president, St. Mary's College of Maryland (since 2010); former acting president, Hamilton College (2009)
- Daniel C. Van Norman (1838) – educator, clergyman, and school founder
- John Monroe Van Vleck (1850) – twice acting president, Wesleyan (1872–73, 1887–89); astronomer, mathematician
- Clarence Abiathar Waldo (A.B. 1875, A.M. 1878) – twice acting president, Rose–Hulman Institute of Technology (1885–86, 1888–89); mathematician
- Henry White Warren (1853) – co-founder, Iliff School of Theology
- William Fairfield Warren (1853) – co-founder, Wellesley College in 1870; 1st president, Boston University (1873–03); acting president, Boston University School of Theology (1866–73)
- Robert Weisbuch (1968) – 11th president, Drew University (since 2005); former president, Woodrow Wilson National Fellowship Foundation
- Herbert George Welch (B.A. 1887, M.A. 1890) – 5th president, Ohio Wesleyan University (1905–16)
- Bishop Erastus Wentworth (B.A. 1837) – 7th president, McKendree College (1846–50)
- Georg Whitaker (1861) – 4th president, Wiley College (1888–91) (HBCU); 7th president, Willamette University (1891–93); president, Portland University
- Alexander Winchell (B.A. 1847, M.A. 1850) – 1st chancellor, Syracuse University (1872–74)
- Henry Merritt Wriston (B.A. 1911, M.A.) – 11th president, Brown University (1937–55); 8th president, Lawrence University (1925–37); father of Walter B. Wriston (see below)

==== Professors and scholars ====
- David Abram (1980) – philosopher, cultural ecologist
- Kenneth R. Andrews (M.A. 1932) – academic credited with foundational role (at Harvard Business School) in introducing, popularizing concept of business strategy
- Elliot Aronson (M.A. 1956) – among 100 most eminent psychologists of 20th century
- John William Atkinson (1947) – psychologist, pioneered the scientific study of human motivation, achievement, and behavior
- Wilbur Olin Atwater (1865) – chemist, leader in development of agricultural chemistry
- Adam J. Berinsky (1992) – professor of political science, Massachusetts Institute of Technology
- Albert Francis Blakeslee (1896) – botanist, director of the Carnegie Institution for Science; professor, Smith College
- George Hubbard Blakeslee (A.B. 1893, A.M. 1897) – professor of history, Clark University; founded the first American journal devoted to international relations
- Jennifer Finney Boylan (1980) – author, professor of English, Colby College (1988–)
- Lael Brainard – former professor of applied economics, MIT Sloan School of Management
- Kenneth Bruffee – emeritus professor of English; wrote first peer tutoring handbook
- Leonard Burman (1975) – economist, tax-policy expert; Professor of public affairs, Maxwell School of Citizenship and Public Affairs, Syracuse University
- Leslie Cannold (1987) – academic ethicist; Australian public intellectual
- John Bissell Carroll (1937) – psychologist; known for his contributions to psychology, educational linguistics and psychometrics
- KC Chan – former professor of finance and dean, business management, Hong Kong University of Science and Technology; Hong Kong secretary for Financial Services and the Treasury (since 2007)
- Arthur W. Chickering (1950) – educational researcher; known for contributions to student development theories
- John H. Coatsworth (1963) – historian of Latin America; provost, Columbia University; dean, Columbia University School of International and Public Affairs (2007–12)
- Marion Cohen (PhD in mathematics (distribution theory)) – mathematician and poet
- Kate Cooper – professor of Ancient History at the University of Manchester, England
- Jeffrey N. Cox (1975) – professor of English literature; leading scholar of late 18th- to early 19th-century theater and drama
- Norman Daniels (1964) – philosopher, ethicist, and bioethicist, Harvard University
- Ram Dass (M.A.) – former professor of psychology, Harvard University; spiritual teacher; wrote book Be Here Now
- Marc Davis (1989) – founding director, Yahoo! Research Berkeley
- Walter Dearborn (B.A. 1900, M.A.) – pioneering educator, experimental psychologist; helped establish field of reading education; longtime professor, Harvard University
- Daniel Dennett (attended) – professor of philosophy, Tufts University; Jean Nicod Prize
- Stephen M. Engel – political scientist, professor at Bates College (1998–)
- Raymond D. Fogelson – anthropologist; a founder of the subdiscipline of ethnohistory; professor, University of Chicago
- Virginia Page Fortna (1990) – professor of political science at Columbia University
- Michael Foster – professor of Japanese literature, culture, and folklore; author
- Daniel Z. Freedman – physicist, professor of physics and applied mathematics, Massachusetts Institute of Technology; co-discovered supergravity
- David Garrow (1975) – Pulitzer Prize for Biography; fellow, Homerton College, Cambridge University
- Mark H. Gelber (1972) – American-Israeli scholar of comparative literature and German-Jewish literature and culture
- Gayatri Gopinath (1994) – scholar of social and cultural analysis; director, Asian/Pacific/American Studies, New York University
- Adolf Grünbaum (1943) – philosopher of science and critic of psychoanalysis and Karl Popper
- Saidiya Hartman – professor of African-American literature and history, Columbia University (as of 2010)
- Ole Holsti (MAT 1956) – political scientist, Duke University (1974–1998), emeritus chair (since 1998); creator, inherent bad faith model
- Gerald Holton (1941) – emeritus professor of physics and professor of the History of Physics, Harvard University
- William G. Howell (1993) – Sydney Stein Professor in American Politics at Chicago Harris and a professor in the Department of Political Science and the College at the University of Chicago
- Shelly Kagan – Clark Professor of Philosophy, Yale University; former Henry R. Luce Professor of Social Thought and Ethics, Yale University
- Douglas Kahn (M.A. 1987) – professor of Media and Innovation, National Institute for Experimental Arts, University of New South Wales; professor emeritus in Science and Technology Studies, University of California, Davis; 2006 Guggenheim Fellowship
- Edwin W. Kemmerer – economist; economic adviser to foreign governments worldwide; professor, Princeton University
- William L. Lane – New Testament theologian and professor of biblical studies
- Seth Lerer (1976) – professor of English and comparative literature, Stanford University
- Peter Lipton (1976) – Hans Rausing professor and head of the Department of History and Philosophy of Science, University of Cambridge
- Richard M. Locke (1981) – provost, Schreiber Family Professor of Political Science and International and Public Affairs at Brown University; former deputy dean, MIT Sloan School of Management
- Silas Laurence Loomis (1844) – professor of chemistry, physiology, and toxicology, Georgetown University
- Delmar R. Lowell – historian and genealogist
- Saree Makdisi (1987) – professor of English and comparative literature, University of California, Los Angeles; also literary critic
- Harold Marcuse (physics, 1979) – professor of modern and contemporary German history
- Harold Marks – British educator
- David McClelland (1938) – noted for his work on achievement motivation; co-creator of scoring system for Thematic Apperception Test; professor, Harvard University
- Lee C. McIntyre – philosopher of science
- Elmer Truesdell Merrill (1881) – Latin scholar; professor of Latin, University of Chicago
- Joseph C. Miller (1961) – professor of history, University of Virginia (since 1972)
- Indiana Neidell (1989) – historian, host and lead writer of The Great War YouTube channel
- Eugene Allen Noble (1891) – president of Centenary University 1902–1908, 3rd president of Goucher College 1908–1911, 16th president of Dickinson College 1911–1914
- Tavia Nyong'o (B.A.) – historian, Kenyan-American cultural critic; professor, New York University; Marshall Scholarship
- Thomas Pickard – Canadian professor of mathematics, Mount Allison University (1848–1869)
- Horace Jacobs Rice (1905) – lawyer, associate dean, Northeastern University School of Law, Dean of the College of Western New England School of Law from
- Paul North Rice (1910) – librarian, director of Reference at the New York Public Library, sirector of NYU libraries, Director of the Wesleyan University Library 1953–56
- Edward Bennett Rosa (1886) – Elliott Cresson Medal, Franklin Institute; professor of physics (1891–1901)
- Juliet Schor – professor, sociology, Boston College; professor, economics (for 17 years), Harvard University
- Sanford L. Segal (1958) – mathematician, professor of mathematics, historian of science and mathematics
- Ira Sharkansky (1960) – professor emeritus, political science, Hebrew University of Jerusalem; fellow National Academy of Public Administration
- Steven M. Sheffrin (1972) – economist and expert on property tax limitations in the U.S.
- Horst Siebert – German economist; chair, economic theory, Kiel University (1989–2003), University of Konstanz (1984–89), University of Mannheim (1969–84)
- Neil Asher Silberman – archaeologist and historian
- Richard Slotkin (MAEE) – professor of American studies (appears above), published by Wesleyan University Press
- Charles H. Smith (1972) – historian of science
- Robert Stalnaker – Laurance S. Rockefeller Professor of Philosophy, Massachusetts Institute of Technology; delivered the 2006–2007 John Locke Lectures at Oxford University
- H. Eugene Stanley (1962) – recipient, 2004 Boltzmann Medal; professor of physics, Boston University
- Leland Stowe (1921) – 1930 Pulitzer Prize for Correspondence; recipient, Légion d'honneur; professor and journalist, University of Michigan in Ann Arbor (1955–1970), emeritus (1970)
- Mark C. Taylor (1968) – philosopher of religion, professor and chair of religion, Columbia University
- Edward Thorndike (1895) – psychologist; work led to theory of connectionism in artificial intelligence, neuroscience, philosophy of mind
- Lynn Thorndike (1902) – George Sarton Medal; historian; former professor, Columbia University
- Robert L. Thorndike (1941) – psychometrician and educational psychologist
- Robert M. Thorndike (1965) – professor of psychology known for several definitive textbooks on research procedures and psychometrics
- Charles Tiebout (1950) – economist; known for his development of Tiebout model; free rider problem; feet voting
- Aaron Louis Treadwell (B.S. 1888, M.S. 1890) – professor, biology and zoology, Vassar College
- Albert E. Van Dusen (MA, PhD) – historian, professor of history, University of Connecticut (1949–1983); Connecticut State Historian (1952–1985)
- Edward Burr Van Vleck (1884) – mathematician; professor, University of Wisconsin–Madison
- Christian K. Wedemeyer (1991) – history of religions faculty, University of Chicago Divinity School
- William Stone Weedon (M.S.) – University Professor, University of Virginia (philosophy, mathematics, logic, linguistic analysis)
- Kenneth D. West (1973) – professor of economics, University of Wisconsin–Madison; developed (with Whitney K. Newey) the Newey-West estimator
- Alexander Winchell (1847) – professor of physics and civil engineering, professor of geology and paleontology at University of Michigan
- Caleb Thomas Winchester (1869) – scholar of English literature

=== Art and architecture ===
- Natalia Alonso (economics 2000) – professional dancer, Complexions Contemporary Ballet; former dancer, Ballet Hispanico
- Steven Badanes (1967) – architect; known for his practice, teaching of design/build
- I Made Bandem (PhD, ethnomusicology) – Balinese dancer, author; rector, Indonesian Institute of the Arts, Yogyakarta
- Meredith Bergmann (1976) – sculptor, Women's Memorial (Boston)
- Lisa Brown (1993) – illustrator, author
- Momodou Ceesay (1970) – African fine artist and writer
- George Fisk Comfort – founder, Metropolitan Museum of Art, Everson Museum of Art
- Bradshaw Crandell – artist and illustrator; known as the "artist of the stars"
- Jeffrey Deitch (1974) – art dealer, curator, and, since 2010, director of the Museum of Contemporary Art, Los Angeles (MOCA)
- Vincent Fecteau (1992) – sculptor; work in permanent collections, Museum of Modern Art, San Francisco Museum of Modern Art
- Ralph Carlin Flewelling – architect
- Ellen Forney (1989) – cartoonist; nomination, 2007 Eisner Award; illustrated winner, 2007 National Book Award
- Danny Forster (1999) – architect; host, Extreme Engineering and Build It Bigger
- Renée Green – artist, sculptor; professor, MIT School of Architecture and Planning
- Lyle Ashton Harris (1988) – artist; collage, installation art, performance art
- Rachel Harrison (1989) – contemporary sculptor; multimedia artist; Calder Prize
- Morrison Heckscher (1962) – art historian and retired curator of the American Wing at the Metropolitan Museum of Art
- Dana Hoey (1989) – visual artist working with photography
- Jonathan Horowitz (1987) – multimedia artist; sculptor, sound installations
- Wayne Howard (1971) – graphic artist; created Midnight Tales
- Bruce Eric Kaplan – cartoonist (The New Yorker); television writer (Six Feet Under; Seinfeld)
- Stephan Koplowitz (1979) – choreographer, director; 2004 Alpert Award in the Arts
- Abigail Levine – choreographer, dancer
- C. Stanley Lewis – artist, professor of art
- Paul Lewis 1998 – Rome Prize; director, Graduate Studies, Princeton University School of Architecture; principal, LTL Architects
- Glenn Ligon – contemporary conceptual artist; work in collection of the White House
- Nava Lubelski (1990) – contemporary artist
- Thomas McKnight – artist; work commissioned by then-U.S. President Bill Clinton and in the permanent collection, Metropolitan Museum of Art and Smithsonian Institution
- Alix Olson (1997) – performance artist, award-winning slam poet
- John Spike (1973) – art historian of Italian Renaissance; contemporary art critic
- Jim Sugar – photographer
- Thomas Bangs Thorpe (1834–1837) – antebellum humorist, painter, illustrator, author
- Lori Verderame (MLS) – best known as "Dr. Lor"; appraiser, TV show Auction Kings
- Robert Vickrey – artist and author; collections in Metropolitan Museum of Art, Whitney Museum of American Art, Brooklyn Museum, Corcoran Gallery of Art
- Ben Weiner (2003) – contemporary artist; oil painting, video
- Chris Wink – co-founder, Blue Man Group and Blue Man Creativity Center

=== Business ===
- Robert Allbritton (1992) – chairman, chief executive officer (CEO), Allbritton Communications; publisher, Politico
- Kenneth R. Andrews (M.A. 1932) – credited with foundational role (at Harvard Business School) in introducing, popularizing concept of business strategy
- Douglas J. Bennet – former CEO, National Public Radio (1983–93)
- William Bissell – sole managing director, Fabindia (1993–)
- Jonathan S. Bush – co-founder, president, CEO, athenahealth (as of 2012)
- KC Chan – ex-officio chairman, Kowloon–Canton Railway Corporation (2007–11); former director, Hong Kong Futures Exchange
- D. Ronald Daniel (1952) – managing partner (1976–88), McKinsey & Company; developed concept, critical success factors
- Charles E. Exley, Jr. (1951) – president (1976–91), chairman (1984–91), CEO (1983–91), NCR Corporation
- Mallory Factor – merchant banker
- John B. Frank (B.A.) – managing principal (since 2007), general counsel (2001–06), Oaktree Capital Management
- Mansfield Freeman (1916) – one of original founders, AIG; philanthropist
- Jim Friedlich – media executive, Dow Jones & Company (1990–00); founding partner, ZelnickMedia (2001–11); founding partner, Empirical Media Advisors (since 2011)
- Pete Ganbarg (1988) – president of A&R, Atlantic Records (as of 2017)
- John Hagel III (1972) – co-chairman, Deloitte Center for Edge Innovation (as of 2012); coined the term "infomediary"
- Henry I. Harriman – co-founder, New England Power Company
- Charles James (1976) – vice president and general counsel, ChevronTexaco
- Herb Kelleher (1953) – founder, chairman, president, CEO, Southwest Airlines; chair, board of governors, Federal Reserve Bank of Dallas (2011–13)
- Edward M. Kennedy, Jr. (1983) – co-founder, president (as of 2012), Marwood Group (Wall Street investment firm); attorney (disability law)
- George M. La Monte (1884) – chairman, Prudential Insurance Company
- Gary Loveman (1982) – president of the Aetna Inc. subsidiary Healthagen (since 2015); former chairman and former CEO of Caesars Entertainment Corporation; former professor, Harvard School of Business
- John Macy – president, Corporation for Public Broadcasting (1969–72); ran the Council of Better Business Bureau (1972–1979)
- Tom Matlack (1986) – entrepreneur, venture capitalist, and author
- Nick Meyer – president, Paramount Vantage (until 2008); former president, Lionsgate International, a division of Lionsgate Studios
- Candace Nelson – founder, Sprinkles Cupcakes (2005); pastry chef; judge, television series Cupcake Wars (since 2010)
- Chuck Pagano (MALS) – chief technology officer, executive vice president of technology, ESPN; Sporting News "Power 100" list (2003 and 2006)
- Tom Rogers (1976) – president, CEO, TiVo (since 2005); former chairman, CEO, Primedia; former president, NBC Cable; founded CNBC, established MSNBC
- Jonathan I. Schwartz (1987) – president (2004–10), CEO (2006–10), Sun Microsystems; founder, CEO, Lighthouse Design (1989–96)
- Marc Shmuger (1980) – chairman, Universal Pictures (until October 2009)
- Jonathan Soros (1992) – hedge fund manager and political donor; son of George Soros
- Steve Spinner – business executive, known for his work as an angel investor and advisor to Silicon Valley startups
- Gerald Tsai (1947–48) – founder, CEO, Primerica; pioneered use of performance funds
- Laura Ruth Walker (1979) – president, CEO, WNYC Public Radio Station, largest public-radio station in nation; named one of NYC's Most Powerful Women by Crain's New York Business (2009)
- Dan Wolf (1979) – founder, president, CEO, Cape Air (since 1988)
- Luke Wood (1991) – president, chief operating officer, Beats Electronics
- Walter B. Wriston (1941) – commercial banker; former chairman (1979–84), CEO (1967–84), Citibank and Citicorp
- Strauss Zelnick (1979) – CEO (2011–), chairman (2007–), Take-Two Interactive; founder, managing partner, ZelnickMedia (2001–); president, chief operating officer (1989–93), 20th Century Fox; CEO, BMG Entertainment (1998–2000)

=== Film, television, acting ===
See also: Academy, Emmy, Tony, and Grammy awards

==== Writers ====
- Carter Bays (1997) – writer, creator, executive producer, How I Met Your Mother
- Mark Bomback – screenwriter
- Jennifer Crittenden (1992) – writer, producer; two Humanitas Prizes, Seinfeld, Everybody Loves Raymond, The New Adventures of Old Christine
- Ed Decter (1979) – screenwriter, There's Something About Mary, The Santa Clause 2, The Santa Clause 3
- Jennifer Flackett (1986) – screen/television writer, film director; Madeline, Wimbledon, Little Manhattan, Nim's Island and Journey to the Center of the Earth
- Liz Friedman – writer, producer; Xena: Warrior Princess, Hack, The O.C., Numb3rs, House; co-creator, writer, executive producer, Young Hercules
- Liz W. Garcia (1999) – writer and producer; Dawson's Creek, Wonderfalls, Cold Case; co-created TNT series Memphis Beat
- Audrey Golden, writer, journalist, lecturer, and radio presenter
- David H. Goodman (1995) – television writer and producer, Fringe, Without a Trace
- Katie Halper (born July 11, 1980/1981), activist, comedian, writer, filmmaker, podcaster, political commentator; host of The Katie Halper Show; co-host of Useful Idiots with Aaron Maté
- Willy Holtzman – screenwriter, playwright; Humanitas Prize, Writers Guild Award, Peabody Award
- Alex Kurtzman – film, television screenwriter, producer; film: The Legend of Zorro, Mission: Impossible III, Transformers, Cowboys & Aliens, Star Trek, Star Trek Into Darkness; television: Fringe
- Catie Lazarus – writer, storyteller and talk show host
- Brett Matthews (1999) – writer, TV shows and comics
- Kate Purdy (2001) – Writers Guild of America Award for Television: Animation; writer, producer, Cougar Town, Enlisted, The McCarthys, Bojack Horseman; co-creator, writer, executive producer, Undone
- Craig Thomas (1997) – writer, creator, executive producer How I Met Your Mother
- Joss Whedon (1987) – creator of Buffy the Vampire Slayer, Firefly and screenwriter & director The Avengers
- Zack Whedon (2002) – screenwriter
- Mike White (1992) – two Independent Spirit John Cassavetes Awards; co-creator, screenwriter, Enlightened, The Good Girl, Orange County, Chuck & Buck, The White Lotus

==== Directors ====
- Phil Abraham – television director, cinematographer (The Sopranos, Mad Men, Orange is the New Black)
- Michael Arias (attended from age 16 to 18) – film director, producer, visual effects artist; filmmaker active primarily in Japan
- Miguel Arteta (1989) – film director (The Good Girl, Cedar Rapids)
- Michael Bay (1986) – film director (The Rock, Armageddon, Pearl Harbor, Bad Boys Series, Transformers film series)
- Eric Byler (1994) – film director (Charlotte Sometimes, My Life Disoriented, Americanese, TRE)
- Jan Eliasberg (1974) – director (television, theatre, and film)
- Michael Fields – director
- Ruben Fleischer (1997) – director; Zombieland, 30 Minutes or Less
- Thomas Kail (1999) – film and theatre director
- David Kendall – television and film director, producer, and writer; Growing Pains, Boy Meets World, Smart Guy, Hannah Montana, Dirty Deeds, The New Guy
- Daisy von Scherler Mayer (1988) – film director (Party Girl, Madeline, The Guru, Woo)
- Matthew Penn (1980) – director and producer of television and theatre; NYPD Blue, Law & Order, The Sopranos, House, Damages, The Closer, and Royal Pains
- Neo Sora (2014) – director (film and music videos)
- Ray Tintori (2006) – director (film and music videos)
- Jon Turteltaub (1985) – film director (Cool Runnings, Phenomenon, While You Were Sleeping, National Treasure, 3 Ninjas)
- Matt Tyrnauer – director and journalist; Valentino: The Last Emperor (2009), short listed for an Academy Award nomination (2010)
- Benh Zeitlin (2004) – film director (Beasts of the Southern Wild)

==== Actors and others ====
- Edoardo Ballerini – actor, writer, director
- Jordan Belfi (2000) – actor
- Rob Belushi (2004) – actor, comedian and host of Get a Clue on Game Show Network
- Amy Bloom (1975) – creator, State of Mind
- Peter Cambor (2001) – film and television actor; NCIS: Los Angeles
- Rob Campbell – actor (film, television, and stage)
- Hunter Carson (1998) – actor, screenwriter, producer, director
- Philip Casnoff (1971) – Golden Globe-nominated Broadway, television, and film actor (Chess, Shogun: The Musical, North and South, Sinatra)
- Lynn Chen (1998) – actress, Saving Face
- William Christopher (1954) – actor, Father John Patrick Francis Mulcahy, M*A*S*H
- Jem Cohen (1984) – Independent Spirit Award, feature filmmaker and video artist
- Sarah Elmaleh (2007) – voice actor
- Toby Emmerich – producer, film executive, screenwriter; head, New Line Cinema (as of 2008)
- Halley Feiffer (2007) – actress, playwright
- Beanie Feldstein (2015) – actress
- Jo Firestone (2009) actress and comedian
- Sam Fleischner (2006) – filmmaker
- Bradley Fuller – producer, co-owner of Platinum Dunes
- Bobbito García (1988) – hip hop DJ, writer
- William "Willie" Garson – actor, White Collar; most known for his portrayal of Stanford on Sex and the City
- Max Goldblatt (2005) – actor, writer, director
- Matthew Greenfield – Independent Spirit John Cassavetes Award, producer of independent films
- Adam Hann-Byrd (2004) – actor, Little Man Tate, The Ice Storm, Jumanji
- Elisabeth Harnois (2001) – actress, Young Artist Award (1993); Adventures in Wonderland, Pretty Persuasion
- Jack Johnson (2009) – actor, best known for performance in Lost in Space
- Warren Keith – stage and film actor, director
- Chrishaunda Lee – television host, actress
- Jieho Lee (1995) – filmmaker
- Tembi Locke – actress, has appeared on more than 40 television shows
- Lauren LoGiudice – actress and writer
- Monica Louwerens (1995) – actress, beauty queen from Canada, competed in 1996 Miss America Pageant
- Barton MacLane – actor, playwright, screenwriter; appeared in many classic films from the 1930s through the 1960s
- Lin-Manuel Miranda (2002)-Tony-Award-winning Broadway actor, librettist, and composer
- Becky Mode – playwright, actress, television producer
- William R. Moses (attended) – television and film actor
- Indy Neidell – documentarian, historian, and actor
- Julius Onah – filmmaker of Nigerian descent
- Amanda Palmer (1998) – director Hotel Blanc (2002); playwright, actress, The Onion Cellar (2006); producer, actress in ART's Cabaret (2010)
- Benjamin Parrillo (1992) – actor, Cold Case, 24, NCIS, Boston Legal
- Zak Penn (1990) – screenwriter (Fantastic Four, X-Men: The Last Stand, PCU, The Incredible Hulk); director (Incident at Loch Ness, The Grand); co-creator, Alphas
- John Rothman (1971) – film, stage, and television actor
- Stefan Schaefer (1994) – director, screenwriter, producer, independent films; Confess and Arranged; Fulbright Scholar
- Sarah Schaub (2006) – two Young Artist Awards, actress (Promised Land)
- Paul Schiff (1981) – film producer (My Cousin Vinny, Rushmore, Mona Lisa Smile, Solitary Man)
- Lawrence Sher (1992) – cinematographer and producer, The Dukes of Hazzard, Garden State
- Wendy Spero – actress, comedian, writer
- Kim Stolz (2005) – America's Next Top Model Cycle 5 finalist
- Stephen Talbot (1970) – former TV child actor of the 1950s, 1960s; portrayed Gilbert Bates on Leave it to Beaver
- Kim Wayans – actress; member of the Wayans family
- Bradley Whitford (1981) – actor, The West Wing, Get Out
- Henry Willson – Hollywood talent agent; clients included Rock Hudson, Tab Hunter, Robert Wagner, Clint Walker; discovered Lana Turner; a large role in popularizing the beefcake craze of the 1950s
- Scott Wiper (1992) – director, screenwriter, actor
- Angela Yee (1997) – radio personality
- Alexander Yellen (2003) – cinematographer

=== Law ===
==== Non-U.S. government judicial figures ====
- George Edwin King (B.A. 1859, M.A. 1861) – 10th puisne justice, Supreme Court of Canada (1893–01); attorney general of New Brunswick (1870–78); premier of New Brunswick (1870–1871 & 1872–1878); Supreme Court of New Brunswick (1880–93)

==== Supreme Court of the United States ====
- David Josiah Brewer (1851–54) – 51st associate justice of the U.S. Supreme Court (1890–1910); major contributor to doctrine of substantive due process and to minority rights; U.S. Court of Appeals for the Eighth Circuit (1884–90); U.S. District Court for the District of Kansas (1865–69); Kansas Supreme Court (1870–1884)

==== U.S. federal appellate and trial courts ====
- John Baker (A.M. 1879) – judge, United States District Court for the District of Indiana
- John D. Bates (1968) – judge, United States District Court for the District of Columbia (2001–); judge, United States Foreign Intelligence Surveillance Court (2006–)
- Edward G. Biester, Jr. (1952) – judge, United States Court of Military Commission Review (2004–07); attorney general for Commonwealth of Pennsylvania (1979–80)
- Denise Jefferson Casper (B.A. 1990) – judge, U.S. District Court for the District of Massachusetts (2010–); 1st black, female judge to serve on federal bench in Massachusetts
- Alonzo J. Edgerton (1850) – judge, United States District Court for the District of South Dakota (1889–96); chief justice of Supreme Court of Dakota Territory
- Katherine B. Forrest (1986) – judge, United States District Court for the Southern District of New York (2011–)
- Terry J. Hatter (1954) – judge, United States District Court for the Central District of California, Los Angeles (as of 2011); chief judge, 1998; senior status, 2005
- Andrew Kleinfeld (1966) – judge, United States Court of Appeals for the Ninth Circuit (1991–); judge, United States District Court for the District of Alaska (1986–91)
- Martin A. Knapp (1868) – judge, United States Court of Appeals for the Fourth Circuit (1916–23); judge, United States Court of Appeals for the Second Circuit (1910–16); judge, United States Commerce Court (1910–13)
- Mark R. Kravitz (1972) – judge, United States District Court for the District of Connecticut (2003–2012)
- Arthur MacArthur Sr. – judge, predecessor, United States District Court for the District of Columbia (1870–87)
- James Rogers Miller Jr. (1953) – judge, United States District Court for the District of Maryland (1970–86)
- Patricia Head Minaldi (1980) – judge, United States District Court for the Western District of Louisiana (2003–2018)
- J. Frederick Motz (1964) – judge, United States District Court for the District of Maryland (1985–), chief judge (1994–01); U.S. attorney for the District of Maryland
- Michael S. Nachmanoff – judge of the United States District Court for the Eastern District of Virginia (2021–present), magistrate judge of the United States District Court for the Eastern District of Virginia (2015–2021)
- John Wesley North – judge, by presidential appointment, predecessor, United States District Court for the District of Nevada; founder, Northfield, Minnesota and Riverside, California
- Anthony Scirica (1962) – chief judge, United States Court of Appeals for the Third Circuit (Philadelphia) (1987–); judge, United States District Court for the Eastern District of Pennsylvania (1984–87)
- Dominic J. Squatrito (1961) – judge, United States District Court for the District of Connecticut (1994–2021); Fulbright scholar
- Stephen S. Trott (1962) – judge, U.S. Court of Appeals for the Ninth Circuit (1988–); U.S. attorney for the Central District of California
- Ronald M. Whyte (mathematics 1964) – judge, United States District Court for the Northern District of California (1992–)
- John Simson Woolson (A.B. 1860, A.M. 1863) – judge, United States District Court for the District of Iowa

==== U.S. state courts ====
- Raymond E. Baldwin – chief justice (1959–63), associate justice (1949–59), Connecticut Supreme Court
- John Moore Currey – eighth chief justice (1866–68), associate justice (1864–66), Supreme Court of California
- Charles Douglas III (1960–62) – associate justice, New Hampshire Supreme Court (1977–85)
- Miles T. Granger (1842) – associate justice, Connecticut Supreme Court
- Ernest A. Inglis (1908) – chief justice (1853–57), associate justice (1850–53), Connecticut Supreme Court (1950–57)
- Fred C. Norton (1950) – associate judge, Minnesota Court of Appeals
- James McMillan Shafter – judge, California Superior Court and state legislator in California, Vermont, and Wisconsin
- David K. Thomson – associate justice of the New Mexico Supreme Court (2019–present)
- Arthur T. Vanderbilt – chief justice, New Jersey Supreme Court; twice declined nomination, United States Supreme Court
- Josiah O. Wolcott – chancellor, Delaware Court of Chancery; Attorney General of Delaware

==== Government and other lawyers ====
- Gerald L. Baliles (1963) – attorney general of Virginia (1982–1985) and governor of Virginia (1986–1990)
- Tristram Coffin (1985) – U.S. attorney for the District of Vermont (2009–2015)
- Edmund Pearson Dole (1874) – first attorney general of Hawaii, Territory of Hawaii
- Brian E. Frosh (1968) – attorney general of Maryland (2015-present) Maryland State Senator (1995–2015); Maryland House of Delegates (1987–1995)
- Theodore E. Hancock (1871) – New York State attorney general (1894–1898)
- Rusty Hardin (1965) – trial attorney, efforts resulted in U.S. Supreme Court unanimously overturning Arthur Andersen's conviction of obstruction of justice
- Eddie Jordan (1974) – U.S. attorney for the Eastern District of Louisiana (1994–2001); district attorney of Orléans Parish (2003–2007)
- Edward J. C. Kewen (1843) – first attorney general of California; also Los Angeles County district attorney (1859–1861)
- Theodore I. Koskoff (1913–89) A.B. – trial lawyer
- John Gage Marvin (1815–55) A.B. – lawyer; legal bibliographer (Marvin's Legal Bibliography, or A thesaurus of American, English, Irish, and Scotch law books); figure in history of California; first California state superintendent of Public Instruction
- Michele A. Roberts (1977) – trial lawyer; named "one of Washington's 100 Most Powerful Women"; partner, Skadden, Arps (2011–)
- Abner W. Sibal (1943) – general counsel, United States Equal Employment Opportunity Commission (EEOC) (1975–1978)

==== Legal academia ====
- Gabriel J. Chin (1985) – UC Davis School of Law (2011–); "Most Cited Law Professors by Specialty, 00–07", "50 Most Cited Law Profs Who entered Teaching Since 92"
- Ward Farnsworth (1989) – dean, University of Texas School of Law at Austin (2012–); former law clerk, Anthony Kennedy, Associate Justice, U.S. Supreme Court
- Shad Saleem Faruqi (B.A., age 19) – professor of Law, Universiti Teknologi MARA (1971–); constitutional consultant to Maldives, Fiji, Timor Leste, Afghanistan, Iraq
- John C.P. Goldberg (CSS 1983) – Eli Goldston Professorship, Harvard Law School (2008–); former law clerk, Byron White, Associate Justice, U.S. Supreme Court; expert in tort law and theory, political theory, jurisprudence
- Robert J. Harris – attorney and professor, University of Michigan Law School (1959–1974; adjunct faculty member, 1974–2005); Rhodes Scholar
- Naomi Mezey (1987) – professor, Georgetown University Law Center (civil procedure, legislation, nationalism and cultural identity) (1997–); Watson Fellow
- William Callyhan Robinson (1850–1852) – academician, jurist; professor, Yale Law (1869–95); dean, Columbus School of Law (1898–1911)
- Arthur T. Vanderbilt (1910) – dean, New York University Law School (1943–48); professor, NYU Law (1914–43)
- Charles Alan Wright (1947) – long-time professor, University of Texas School of Law at Austin; foremost authority in U.S. on constitutional law and federal procedure

=== Literature ===
See also: Pulitzer Prizes

- Becky Albertalli (2004) – writer, Simon vs. the Homo Sapiens Agenda and other best-selling works
- Steve Almond (1988) – writer, The Best American Short Stories 2010
- Stephen Alter – author
- Suzanne Berne – novelist, winner of Great Britain's prestigious Orange Prize; professor of English
- Kate Bernheimer – author, scholar, editor
- Nicholas Birns (1987, attended but did not graduate) – literary critic and editor
- Peter Blauner – novelist; Edgar Award, The New York Times Best Seller list
- Amy Bloom (1975) – author, Away (The New York Times Best Seller list, 2007); National Magazine Award, The Best American Short Stories, O. Henry Prize Stories
- Andrew Bridge – author, Hope's Boy, New York Times bestseller, Washington Post Best Book of the Year
- John Briggs (1968) – author, scholar, editor
- Ethan Bronner – his novel Battle for Justice was selected by New York Public Library as one of the "Best Books of 1989"
- Alexander Chee – writer, 2003 Whiting Writers' Award; former Visiting Writer at Amherst College
- James Wm. Chichetto – poet, novelist, critic, lecturer, Catholic priest
- Mei Chin – fiction writer, food critic
- Kate Colby (1996) – poet, editor, Norma Farber First Book Award
- Robin Cook, MD (1962) – medical mystery writer; books have appeared on The New York Times Best Seller list, including Coma, Critical, Outbreak, and 29 others
- Amanda Davis (1993) – writer; author of "Wonder When You'll Miss Me"
- Anna Dewdney (1987) – children's author and illustrator
- Paul Dickson (1961) – writer, American English language and popular culture
- Melvin Dixon (1971) – author, poet, translator
- Beverly Donofrio (1978) – author, Riding in Cars with Boys
- Steve Englehart (1969) – comic book writer
- Laura Jane Fraser (1982) – journalist, essayist, memoirist, and travel writer
- Glen David Gold (1966) – author of Carter Beats the Devil, Sunnyside
- Elizabeth Graver (1986) – writer; Drue Heinz Literature Prize, O. Henry Award, Pushcart Prize (2001), Best American Essays, Cohen Awards
- Daniel Handler (1992) – author (under the pseudonym Lemony Snicket) of A Series of Unfortunate Events (children's book series)
- Rust Hills (B.A. 1948, M.A. 1949) – author and fiction editor
- Adina Hoffman (B.A. 1989) – essayist, critic, literary biographer; 2013 Windham–Campbell Literature Prize; 2010 Wingate Prize
- Albert Harrison Hoyt (1850) – editor and author
- Christianne Meneses Jacobs – writer, editor, and teacher
- Kaylie Jones – novelist
- Sebastian Junger (1984) – author of The Perfect Storm, War; DuPont-Columbia Award; Time magazine Top Ten Non-fiction Books of 2010; National Magazine Award
- James Kaplan – novelist, biographer, journalist; 1999 The New York Times Notable Book of the Year; NYT Top 10 Books of 2010; Best American Short Stories
- MJ Kaufman – playwright
- Pagan Kennedy (1984) – author, short listed for Orange Prize; pioneer of the 1990s Zine Movement
- Brad Kessler (1986) – novelist, Whiting Writers' Award (fiction, 2007), Dayton Literary Peace Prize; 2008 Rome Prize
- Gerard Koeppel (1979) – writer, historian
- Christopher Krovatin (2007) – author, musician
- Alisa Kwitney – novelist, Destiny: A Chronicle of Deaths Foretold
- Seth Lerer (1976) – medievalist and literary critic; 2009 National Book Critics Circle Award (for criticism); 2010 Truman Capote Award for Literary Criticism
- Ariel Levy – author of Female Chauvinist Pigs, anthologized in The Best American Essays of 2008 and New York Stories
- James Lord – author, including biographies of Alberto Giacometti and Pablo Picasso
- Robert Ludlum (1951) – The Bourne Identity, The Osterman Weekend, The Holcroft Covenant, 24 others; 9 of his books have made The New York Times Best Seller list; 290–500 million copies of his books in print
- Joanie Mackowski – 2009, 2007 Best American Poetry, 2008 Writer Magazine/Emily Dickinson Award, 2003 Kate Tufts Discovery Award
- John Buffalo Mailer – author, playwright, and journalist
- William J. Mann (M.A.) – novelist, biographer; Kate: The Woman Who Was Hepburn, named one of the 100 Notable Books of 2006 by The New York Times
- Lew McCreary – editor, author, senior editor of the Harvard Business Review
- Jack McDevitt – science fiction author; 2006 Nebula Award for Best Novel (fifteen-time nominee), 2004 Campbell Award
- Leslie McGrath (M.A.) – poet
- John P. McKay (1961) – author, Herbert Baxter Adams Prize, professor of history
- Scott Mebus – novelist, playwright, composer
- Melody Moezzi (2001) – author of War on Error: Real Stories of American Muslims
- Gorham Munson (1917) – literary critic
- Blake Nelson (1984) – author; Grinzane Cavour Prize; novels Girl, Paranoid Park
- Charles Olson (B.A. 1932, M.A.) – modernist poet, crucial link between such poets as Ezra Pound and the New American poets, one of thinkers who coined the term postmodernism
- Michael Palmer, MD (1964) – medical mystery writer, Side Effects, Extreme Measures; all of his 16 books have made the New York Times Best Seller list
- Carolyn Parkhurst (1992) – author of The Dogs of Babel (a New York Times Notable Book) and Lost and Found (both on the New York Times Best Seller list)
- Peter Pezzelli – author, including Francesca's Kitchen, Italian Lessons
- Daniel Pinchbeck – author
- Jason Pinter – novelist and thriller writer
- Craig Pospisil – playwright
- Michael Prescott (1981) – crime writer, many of whose novels have appeared on The New York Times Best Seller list
- Kevin Prufer (1992) – poet, essayist, editor, novelist; winner of five Pushcart Prizes, Best American Poetry 2003, 2010, 2021; 2024 Rilke Prize for American Poetry
- Delphine Red Shirt (MALS) – Oglala Lakota writer, adjunct professor at Yale University and Connecticut College
- Spencer Reece – writer and poet, 2009 Pushcart Prize, 2005 Whiting Writers' Award for poetry
- Jean Rikhoff – writer and editor
- Mary Roach – New York Times Best Selling author; New York Times Notable Books pick (2005); New York Times Book Review Editor's Choice (2008)
- Carlo Rotella (1986) – writer, Whiting Writers' Award (nonfiction, 2007), L. L. Winship/PEN New England Award
- Ruth L. Schwartz – poet
- Sadia Shepard – author, Fulbright Scholar (2001)
- Joyce Sidman (B.A. German) – children's writer; 2011 Newbery Honor Award
- Maya Sonenberg (1982) – short story writer, 1989 Drue Heinz Literature Prize
- Tristan Taormino (1993) – author and sex educator
- Jonathan Thirkield – poet, 2008 Walt Whitman Award
- Wells Tower (1996) – writer, two Pushcart Prizes, Best American Short Stories 2010
- Ayelet Waldman (1986) – author of Love and Other Impossible Pursuits, Daughter's Keeper, and the Mommy-Track Mysteries
- David Rains Wallace – author of The Monkey's Bridge (a 1997 New York Times Notable Book) and The Klamath Knot (1984 John Burroughs Medal)
- Austin Warren (1929) – literary critic, author, and professor of English
- Sam Wasson (2003) – author, film historian, publisher
- D.B. Weiss – author and screenwriter
- Michael Wolfe – author, poet
- Paul Yoon (2002) – writer; 2009 John C. Zacharis First Book Award; O. Henry Award; Best American Short Stories 2006
- Lizabeth Zindel – author, working primarily in the young adult genre

=== Medicine ===
- Andrea Barthwell, MD (B.A.) – named one of "Best Doctors in America" in 1997; Betty Ford Award in 2003
- Herbert Benson, MD (1957) – cardiologist; founding president, Mind-Body Medical Institute; professor, Harvard Medical School (as of 2012)
- Charles Brenner (B.A. 1983) – professor, head of biochemistry, University of Iowa (as of 2012); leader, fields of tumor suppressor gene function and metabolism
- Joseph Fins, MD (B.A. 1982) – chief, Division of Medical Ethics, Weill Cornell Medical College (as of 2012); fellow, Institute of Medicine, National Academy of Sciences
- Michael Fossel, MD (B.A., M.A.) – professor, clinical medicine (as of 2012), known for his views on telomerase therapy
- Scott Gottlieb, MD (1994) – commissioner of Foods and Drugs (2017–2019), Food and Drug Administration, United States Department of Health and Human Services
- Michael E. Greenberg (B.A. 1976) – neuroscientist; National Academy of Sciences; chair of the Department of Neurology at Harvard Medical School (2008–2012)
- Allan Hobson, MD (B.A. 1955) – psychiatrist, dream researcher; professor, psychiatry, Emeritus, Harvard Medical School (as of 2012)
- Joseph L. Melnick (B.A.) – epidemiologist, known as "a founder of modern virology"; Albert B. Sabin Gold Medal
- Anne L. Peters, MD (B.A. 1979) – physician, diabetes expert, and professor of clinical medicine at the Keck School of Medicine of USC
- Ralph Pomeroy, MD (B.A.) – gynecologist, famous for creation of "Pomeroy" tubal ligation; co-founder, the Williamsburg Hospital in Brooklyn, New York
- David J. Sencer, MD (B.A. 1946) – director, United States Centers for Disease Control and Prevention (1966–77); Head, New York City Department of Health ('81–85)
- Theodore Shapiro, MD (B.A. 1936) – psychiatrist
- Edmund Sonnenblick, MD (B.A. 1954) – cardiologist known for research that proved the heart behaves as a muscle, establishing physiological basis for the development of ACE inhibitors to treat heart failure
- Harry Tiebout, MD (B.A. 1917) – psychiatrist, promoted Alcoholics Anonymous approach to patients, fellow professionals, and the public

=== Military ===
- Admiral Thomas H. Collins (four-star rank) (M.A.) – retired 22nd commandant, United States Coast Guard (2002–08) (guided Coast Guard after 9/11)
- Rear Admiral Marshall E. Cusic Jr. MD (two-star rank) (B.A. 1965) – Medical Corps U.S. Naval Reserve; chief, Medical Reserve Corps, Bureau of Medicine and Surgery
- Brigadier General Alonzo Jay Edgerton (B.A. 1850) – American Civil War, Union Army, 67th Regiment Infantry U.S. Colored Troops (brevet March 13, 1865)
- Lieutenant General William H. Ginn Jr. (three-star rank) (1946–48) – United States Air Force; commander, U.S. Forces Japan and U.S. Fifth Air Force
- Brigadier General Levin Major Lewis (class of 1852) – Confederate States Army, American Civil War; assigned to duty as brig. general; president of several colleges
- Admiral James Loy (four-star rank) (M.A.) – retired 21st commandant, U.S. Coast Guard (1998–2002); acting U.S. secretary of Homeland Security (2005)
- Rear Admiral (Ret.) Patrick M. Stillman (two-star rank) (M.A.) – U.S. Coast Guard, founding father of the Integrated Deepwater System Program
- Tuskegee Airman Chuck Stone (B.A. 1948) – Congressional Gold Medal (March 29, 2007); United States Army Air Forces
- Brigadier General John B. Van Petten (B.A. 1850, M.A. '53) – Union Army; his Civil War reminiscences became basis for The Red Badge of Courage

=== Music ===
See also: Academy, Emmy, Tony, and Grammy awards

- Adolovni Acosta – graduate student; classical and concert pianist
- Bill Anschell (1982) – pianist, composer; recorded with Lionel Hampton, Ron Carter
- John Perry Barlow (1969) – lyricist for the Grateful Dead
- Robert Becker – composer and percussionist
- Paul Berliner (PhD) – professor of music, Duke University
- Marion Brown (M.A. ethnomusicology) – alto saxophonist, composer
- Darius Brubeck (1969) – pianist, composer, band leader, professor of music
- Kit Clayton – musician and programmer
- Tim Cohen (B.A.) – San Francisco-based musician and visual artist
- Bill Cole (PhD) – musician; professor of music, Dartmouth College, Amherst College, professor of African-American Studies, Syracuse University
- Nicolas Collins (B.A., M.A.) – composer, mostly electronic music; Watson Fellow
- Amy Crawford (B.A. 2005) – songwriter, vocalist, keyboardist and producer
- Douglas J. Cuomo (attended) – composer
- Nathan Davis (PhD) – musician; professor of music, University of Pittsburgh
- Stanton Davis (M.A.) – trumpeter, educator
- Santi Debriano (M.A.) – double bassist, bandleader
- Frank Denyer (PhD) – professor of composition, Dartington College of Arts, South West England
- Arnold Dreyblatt (M.A. 1982) – composer, based in Berlin, Germany; elected to German Academy of Art
- Judy Dunaway (M.A.) – avant-garde composer; creator, sound installations
- S. A. K. Durga (PhD) – musicologist, ethnomusicologist, professor of music
- Tim Eriksen (M.A. 1993, PhD) – multi-instrumentalist; musicologist; performer, consultant for soundtrack of film Cold Mountain
- James Fei (M.A. 1999) – composer and performer, contemporary classical music
- Dave Fisher (1962) – lead singer, arranger, The Highwaymen; composer
- William Galison – multi-instrumentalist, most famous as harmonica player, composer
- Kiff Gallagher (1991) – musician, songwriter, helped create AmeriCorps
- Alexis Gideon – composer, multi-media artist
- Ben Goldwasser – founding member of Grammy Award-nominated MGMT
- Adam Goren (1996) – sole member of synth-punk band Atom and His Package
- Mary Halvorson (2002) – guitarist
- Jon B. Higgins (B.A., M.A., PhD) – musician; scholar, Carnatic music
- Jay Hoggard (1976) – current faculty, Wesleyan; vibraphonist; recorded often
- Ashenafi Kebede (1969 M.A., 1971 PhD) – Ethiopian ethnomusicologist
- Ron Kuivila (1977) – current faculty, Wesleyan; co-creator, software language Formula
- Steve Lehman (2000 B.A.; 2002 M.A.) – composer, saxophonist; Fulbright scholar
- Le1f (2011) – musician; rapper
- David Leisner – classical guitarist, composer; teacher, Manhattan School of Music
- Charlie Looker (2003) – musician
- MC Frontalot (Damian Hess) (1996) – rapper; innovator of phrase nerdcore
- Mladen Milicevic (M.A. 1988) – composer, experimental music, film music
- Justin Moyer (1998) – musician and journalist
- Dennis Murphy (PhD) – composer, one of the fathers of the American gamelan
- Hankus Netsky (PhD) – Klezmer musician, composer
- Amanda Palmer (1998) – composer/singer/pianist, The Dresden Dolls
- Hewitt Pantaleoni (PhD) – 20th-century ethnomusicologist; known for work in African music
- Sriram Parasuram (PhD) – Hindustani classical vocalist; also a violinist
- Brandon Patton (1995) – songwriter, bassplayer
- Andrew Pergiovanni (B.A.) – composer of "modern classical" and "popular" idioms
- Chris Pureka – singer-songwriter
- John Rapson (PhD) – jazz trombonist and music educator
- Gregory Rogove (2002) – songwriter, indie-music drummer
- Steve Roslonek – children's music performer and composer
- Santigold (Santi White) – electropop/hip-hop artist
- Sarah Kirkland Snider – composer of instrumental music and art songs; co-founder, co-director, New Amsterdam Records
- Tyshawn Sorey (M.A. 2011; faculty 2017–2020) – composer, musician, contemporary classical music, MacArthur Fellow, Pulitzer Prize finalist; professor at University of Pennsylvania
- Anuradha Sriram (M.A.) – Indian carnatic singer; also, as playback singer, in more than 90 Tamil, Telugu, Malayalam, Kannada, and Hindi films
- Carl Sturken (1978 B.A.) – musician, Rhythm Syndicate; songwriter and record producer with Evan Rogers, Syndicated Rhythm Productions
- Karaikudi S. Subramanian (1985, M.A., PhD) – musician; educationist, Carnatic music
- Sumarsam (1976 M.A.) – current faculty, Wesleyan; Javanese musician; virtuoso and scholar of Gamelan
- Himanshu Suri (2007 B.A.) – rapper; writer; alternative hip hop group Das Racist
- Tierney Sutton (1986) – three-time Grammy Award nominated jazz singer; Jazzweek 2005 Vocalist of the Year
- Laxmi Ganesh Tewari (PhD) – Hindustani virtuoso vocalist, professor of music
- Stephen Trask (1989) – composer (stage, screen); Obie Award; Grammy nomination
- Stephen S. Trott (1962) – early member, The Highwaymen, which originated at Wesleyan; #1 single ("Michael Row the Boat Ashore" 1961)
- Andrew VanWyngarden – founding member of Grammy Award nominated MGMT
- Victor Vazquez (2006) – musician; rapper; alternative hip hop group Das Racist
- T. Viswanathan (1975 PhD) – Carnatic flute virtuoso, professor of music
- Dennis Waring (1982 PhD) – ethnomusicologist and Estay Organ historian
- Dar Williams (1989) – folksinger
- Daniel James Wolf (M.A., PhD) – composer of modern classical music
- Peter Zummo (1970, B.A.; 1975, M.A., PhD) – composer, musician, postminimalist

=== News ===
See also: Pulitzer Prizes and Emmy awards

- Eric Asimov (1979) – restaurant columnist, editor, The New York Times (nephew of Isaac Asimov)
- Dominique Browning (1977) – former editor-in-chief, House & Garden
- Katy Butler (1971) – journalist, Best American Essays, Best American Science Writing, finalist for 2004 National Magazine Award
- Marysol Castro (1996) – weather forecaster, CBS The Early Show (2011); weather anchor, contributing writer, ABC Good Morning America Weekend Edition (2004–10)
- Hannah Dreier – New York Times reporter and winner of the 2019 Pulitzer Prize for Feature Writing and the 2024 Pulitzer Prize for Investigative Reporting
- Jonathan Dube – pioneer, online journalism; print journalist
- E.V. Durling – nationally syndicated newspaper columnist and one of the first Hollywood reporters
- Jane Eisner (1977) – editor, The Forward, paper's first female editor; former editor, reporter, columnist, The Philadelphia Inquirer
- Steven Greenhouse (1973) – reporter, The New York Times; 2010 New York Press Club Awards For Journalism; 2009 Hillman Prize
- Ferris Greenslet (1897) – editor, writer; associate editor, Atlantic Monthly; director, literary adviser, Houghton Mifflin Co.
- Vanessa Grigoriadis (1995) – National Magazine Award; writer
- Peter Gutmann (1971) – journalist, attorney
- William Henry Huntington – journalist
- Alberto Ibargüen (1966) – CEO, John S. and James L. Knight Foundation; former publisher, The Miami Herald
- David Karp – pomologist, culinary journalist
- Alex Kotlowitz (1977) – George Polk Award; Peabody Award, There Are No Children Here: The Story of Two Boys Growing Up in the Other America
- Dave Lindorff (1972) – Project Censored Award (2004); investigative reporter, columnist
- Stephen Metcalf – critic-at-large and columnist, Slate magazine
- Kyrie O'Connor (1976) – journalist, writer, editor
- Gail O'Neill – television journalist; former elite African-American fashion model
- Charles Bennett Ray – journalist; owner, editor, The Colored American, first black student at Wesleyan in 1832
- Chuck Stone (1948) – journalist; professor of journalism, University of North Carolina; former editor, Philadelphia Daily News
- Laura Ruth Walker (1979) – 2008 Edward R. Murrow Award; Peabody Award
- Ulrich Wickert (Fulbright Scholar at Wesleyan in 1962) – broadcast journalist in Germany
- John Yang (1980) – Peabody Award-winning journalist; two-time winner, DuPont-Columbia Award; NBC News correspondent, commentator (2007–)

=== Religion ===
- Edward Gayer Andrews (BA 1847) – president, Cazenovia Seminary; later bishop, Methodist Episcopal Church
- Osman Cleander Baker (1830–33) – bishop, Methodist Episcopal Church; biblical scholar; namesake of Baker University, Baldwin City, Kansas
- Lawrence Aloysius Burke (MALS 1970) – 4th archbishop, Roman Catholic Archdiocese of Kingston in Jamaica; 1st archbishop, Roman Catholic Archdiocese of Nassau
- James Wm. Chichetto – Catholic priest, Congregation of Holy Cross, poet, critic
- Davis Wasgatt Clark (1836) – 1st president, Freedman's Aid Society; predecessor, namesake of Clark Atlanta University, Atlanta, Georgia; bishop, Methodist Episcopal Church
- James Midwinter Freeman – clergyman, writer
- William Henry Giler – founder of a seminary and a college; chaplain during the American Civil War
- Debra W. Haffner (1985) – Unitarian Universalist minister; director, The Religious Institute on Sexual Morality, Justice, and Healing
- Gilbert Haven (1846) – 2nd president, Freedman's Aid Society; early proponent of equality of the sexes; bishop, Methodist Episcopal Church
- Robert T. Hoshibata (1973) – Hawaiian bishop, United Methodist Church
- Jesse Lyman Hurlbut (1864) – clergyman, author
- John Christian Keener (1835) – bishop, Methodist Episcopal Church
- Daniel Parish Kidder (1836) – theologian, missionary to Brazil
- Isaac J. Lansing (B.A. 1872, M.A. 1875) – Methodist Episcopal minister of Park Street Church; college president, author
- Delmar R. Lowell (1873) – minister, American Civil War veteran, historian, genealogist
- Willard Francis Mallalieu – bishop, Methodist Episcopal Church
- James Mudge (1865) – clergyman, author, missionary to India
- Thomas H. Mudge (1840) – clergyman
- Zachariah Atwell Mudge (1813–88) – pastor, author
- Frederick Buckley Newell (AB 1913) – bishop, The Methodist Church (elected 1952)
- William Xavier Ninde (A.B. 1855, D.D. 1874) – bishop, Methodist Episcopal Church (now the United Methodist Church); president, Garrett–Evangelical Theological Seminary, Evanston, Illinois
- Spencer Reece (1985) – Episcopal priest; chaplain to the Bishop of Spain for the Spanish Reformed Episcopal Church (Iglesia Española Reformada Episcopal)
- Charles Francis Rice (B.A. 1872, M.A. 1875, D.D. 1893) – Methodist minister
- William Rice (M.A. 1853, D.D. 1876) – Methodist Minister and librarian
- Matthew Richey (M.A. 1836, D.D. 1847) – Canadian minister, educator, and leader in Nova Scotia, Canada
- B. T. Roberts (university honors) – co-founder, Free Methodist Church of North America
- A. James Rudin (1955) – rabbi, Senior Interreligious Adviser, The American Jewish Committee
- James Strong (A.B. 1844, D.D. 1856, LL.D 1881) – creator of Strong's Exhaustive Concordance of the Bible (1890); acting president Troy University, Troy, New York; mayor
- Conrad Tillard (born 1964) – politician, Baptist minister, radio host, author, and civil rights activist
- Moses Clark White (1845) – pioneering missionary in China and physician; first linguistic study of Fuzhou dialect

=== Royalty ===
- Prince Carlos, Prince of Piacenza, Duke of Parma (B.A. government) – head of Royal and Ducal House of Bourbon-Parma; member, Dutch royal family

=== Science, technology, engineering, mathematics ===
- David P. Anderson (1977) – mathematician, computer scientist (as of 2012); Space Sciences Laboratory; Presidential Young Investigator Award
- Wilbur Olin Atwater (1865) – chemist, agricultural chemistry; known for his studies of human nutrition and metabolism
- Oliver L. Austin – ornithologist; wrote the definitive study Birds of the World
- Susan R. Barry (1976) – neurobiologist, specializing in neuronal plasticity (as of 2012)
- Albert Francis Blakeslee (1896) – botanist; leading figure in the genetics; known for research on jimsonweed and fungi
- Everitt P. Blizard (1938) – Canadian-born American nuclear physicist, nuclear engineer; known for his work on nuclear reactor physics and shielding; 1966 Elliott Cresson Medal
- Samuel Botsford Buckley (1836) – botanist, geologist, naturalist
- Henry Smith Carhart (1869) – physicist, specializing in electricity; devised a voltaic cell, the Carhart-Clark cell, among other inventions
- David Carroll (PhD 1993) – physicist, nanotechnologist (as of 2012); director, Center for Nanotechnology and Molecular Materials, Wake Forest University
- Jennifer Tour Chayes (1979) – mathematician, mathematical physicist (as of 2012); National Academy of Sciences; Head, Microsoft Research New England
- Charles Manning Child (A.B. 1890, M.S. 1892) – zoologist; National Academy of Sciences; noted for his work on regeneration at the University of Chicago
- John M. Coffin (1966) – virologist, geneticist, molecular microbiologist (as of 2012); National Academy of Sciences; director, HIV Program, National Cancer Institute
- Richard Dansky – software developer of computer games and designer of role-playing games (as of 2012)
- Russell Doolittle (1951) – biochemist (as of 2012); co-developed the hydropathy index; National Academy of Sciences; 2006 John J. Carty Award for the Advancement of Science; 1989 Paul Ehrlich and Ludwig Darmstaedter Prize
- Clay Dreslough (1993) – software developer (as of 2012); creator, Baseball Mogul and Football Mogul computer sports games; co-founder, president, Sports Mogul
- Gordon P. Eaton (1951) – geologist (as of 2012); 12th Director, United States Geological Service; director, Lamont–Doherty Earth Observatory, Columbia University (1990–94)
- Charles Alton Ellis – mathematician, structural engineer; chiefly responsible for the design of the Golden Gate Bridge
- John Wells Foster (1834) – geologist, paleontologist
- Daniel Z. Freedman – physicist, Massachusetts Institute of Technology (as of 2012); co-discovered supergravity; (2006) Dannie Heineman Prize for Mathematical Physics; 1993 Dirac Prize
- George Brown Goode – ichthyologist; National Academy of Sciences, American Academy of Arts and Sciences
- Leslie Greengard (B.A. 1979) – physician, mathematician, computer scientist; co-inventor, fast multipole method, one of top-ten algorithms of 20th century; Leroy P. Steele Prize; Presidential Young Investigator Award; National Academy of Sciences; National Academy of Engineering
- Frederick Grover (1901) – physicist, National Bureau of Standards, precision measurements; electrical engineer
- Henry I. Harriman (B.A. 1898) – inventor, patents for many automatic looms; builder, hydroelectric dams
- Gerald Holton (1941) – physicist, Emeritus, Harvard University (as of 2012); 10th Jefferson Lecture; George Sarton Medal; Abraham Pais Prize; Andrew Gemant Award
- Orange Judd (1847) – agricultural chemist
- George Kellogg (1837) – inventor, patent expert; improved surgical instruments
- Jim Kurose – computer scientist (as of 2012); 2001 Taylor L. Booth Education Award of the Institute of Electrical and Electronics Engineers
- Oscar Lanford (B.S.) – mathematician, mathematical physicist, dynamical systems theory (as of 2012); Dobrushin-Lanford-Ruelle equations
- Albert L. Lehninger (B.A. 1939) – pioneering research in bioenergetics; National Academy of Sciences
- Silas Laurence Loomis, MD (1844) – mathematician, physiologist, inventor; astronomer, United States Coast Survey (1857); dean, Howard University
- Julia L. Marcus (A.M. 2003) – epidemiologist, science communicator, Harvard Medical School
- William Williams Mather (A.M. 1834) – geologist, inventor; acting president, Ohio University (1845)
- George Perkins Merrill (post-graduate study and research) – geologist; National Academy of Sciences (1922)
- Benjamin Franklin Mudge (1840) – geologist, paleontologist; discovered at least 80 new species of extinct plants and animals
- Fremont Rider (M.A. 1937) – inventor, librarian, genealogist; named one of the 100 Most Important Leaders of Library Science and the Library Profession in the twentieth century
- William Robinson (B.A. 1865, M.A. 1868) – inventor, electrical engineer, mechanical engineer; invented first track circuit used in railway signaling, among other inventions
- Edward Bennett Rosa (1886) – physicist; specialising in measurement science; National Academy of Sciences (1913); Elliott Cresson Medal
- Richard Alfred Rossiter (1914) – astronomer, known for the Rossiter–McLaughlin effect
- H. Eugene Stanley (1962) – physicist, statistical physics (as of 2012); National Academy of Sciences; 2008 Julius Edgar Lilienfeld Prize; 2004 Boltzmann Medal
- Carl Leo Stearns (B.A. 1917) – astronomer; namesake of asteroid (2035) Stearns and crater Stearns (far side of the Moon)
- John Stephenson – invented, patented the first street car to run on rails; remembered as the creator of the tramway
- Charles Wardell Stiles (attended) – parasitologist; groundbreaking work, trichinosis, hookworm; 1921 Public Welfare Medal by National Academy of Sciences
- Lewis B. Stillwell (1882–1884) – electrical engineer; 1933 AIEE Lamme Medal, 1935 IEEE Edison Medal; IEEE's Electrical Engineering Hall of Fame
- Alfred Charles True (1873) – agriculturalist; director, Office of Agricultural Experiment Station, U. S. Department of Agriculture
- George Tucker (PhD) – Puerto Rican physicist (as of 2012); former Olympic luger
- Nicholas Turro (1960) – chemist, Columbia University (as of 2012); National Academy of Sciences, American Academy of Arts and Sciences; 2011 Arthur C. Cope Award; Willard Gibbs Award
- John Monroe Van Vleck (1850) – astronomer, mathematician; namesake of Van Vleck crater on the Moon
- Jesse Vincent (1998) – software developer (as of 2012); developed Request Tracker while a student at Wesleyan; author, Request Tracker for Incident Response
- Christopher Weaver (dual MAs and CAS) – software developer; founder, Bethesda Softworks; spearheaded creation, John Madden Football physics engine; visiting scholar, Massachusetts Institute of Technology
- Henry Seely White (1882) – mathematician; National Academy of Sciences; geometry of curves and surfaces, algebraic twisted curves

=== Activists ===
- Mansoor Alam – humanitarian
- John Emory Andrus (1862) – founder, SURDNA Foundation (1917)
- Cliff Arnebeck – chair, Legal Affairs Committee, Common Cause Ohio; national co-chair and attorney, Alliance for Democracy
- Gerald L. Baliles (1987) – director, Miller Center of Public Affairs (since 2005)
- Jeannie Baliles (M.A.T.) – founder and chair, Virginia Literacy Foundation (since 1987); First Lady of Virginia (1986–90)
- John Perry Barlow (1969) – co-founder, Electronic Frontier Foundation; Fellow, Harvard University's Berkman Center for Internet and Society (since 1998)
- Eric Byler (1994) – political activist; co-founder, Coffee Party USA
- Sasha Chanoff (1994) – founder, executive director, RefugePoint (2005–)
- Jaclyn Friedman (1993) – feminist writer and activist
- Jon Grepstad – Norwegian peace activist, photographer and journalist
- Amir Alexander Hasson (1998) – social entrepreneur; 2010 Massachusetts Institute of Technology's Technology Review's TR35 award; founder, United Villages
- David Jay – asexual activist and founder of the Asexual Visibility and Education Network
- Marc Kasky – consumer activist; co-director, Green Center Institute
- Matt Kelley (2002) – founder, Mavin Foundation
- Harry W. Laidler (1907) – socialist, writer and politician
- Melody Moezzi (2001) – founder, Hooping for Peace, a human-rights organization
- Sandy Newman (1974) – non-profit executive, founder of three successful non-profit organizations
- Robert Carter Pitman (1845) – temperance advocate
- Charles Bennett Ray – first black student, Wesleyan in 1832; abolitionist; promoter, the Underground Railroad
- Juliet Schor – 2005 Leontief Prize (Wassily Leontief) by the Global Development and Environment Institute
- Ted Smith (1967) – environmental activist; founder and former executive director, Silicon Valley Toxics Coalition
- Chuck Stone – associated with the civil-rights and Black Power movements; first president, National Association of Black Journalists
- Conrad Tillard (born 1964) – politician, Baptist minister, radio host, author, and civil rights activist
- Arthur T. Vanderbilt – proponent of U.S. court modernization and reform

=== Sports ===
- Tobin Anderson (1995) – head coach of the Iona Gaels men's basketball team (2023–present), Fairleigh Dickinson Knights men's basketball team (2022–2023); coached Fairleigh Dickinson when they became the first No. 16 seed out of the First Four to defeat a No. 1 seed in the NCAA Division I men's basketball tournament
- Everett Bacon (1913) – football quarterback, pioneer of the forward pass, College Football Hall of Fame
- Bill Belichick (1975) – head coach of the New England Patriots; 2004 Time's "100 Most Influential People in the World"; nine-time Super Bowl participant as head coach, won in 2001, 2003, 2004, 2014, 2016, and 2018 (lost in Super Bowl XLII (2007), Super Bowl XLVI (2011), and Super Bowl LII (2017)); first NFL coach to win three Super Bowls in four years; NFL Coach of the Year three times (2003, 2007, 2010)
- Ambrose Burfoot (1968) – first collegian to win the Boston Marathon; won Manchester Road Race nine times; executive editor, Runner's World magazine
- Mike Carlson (1972) – National Football League and NFL Europe pundit (for Channel 4 in the United Kingdom)
- Eudice Chong (2016) – professional tennis player, reached #366 in the WTA singles rankings and #153 in the WTA singles rankings
- Logan Cunningham (1907–09) – football player and coach
- Wink Davenport (1964) – former volleyball Olympic player, coach, and official; father, tennis champion Lindsay Davenport
- Richard E. Eustis (1914) – football player and coach
- Jeff Galloway (1967) – former Olympian, runner and author of Galloway's Book on Running
- Frank Hauser (1979) – football coach
- Jed Hoyer (1996) – executive vice president and general manager, Chicago Cubs; former general manager (2009–11), San Diego Padres; former assistant general manager (2003–09), interim co-manager (2005–06), Boston Red Sox
- Kathy Keeler (1978) – Olympic gold medalist, rowing (member of the women's eight) in the 1984 Olympics; Olympics coach in 1996
- Dan Kenan (1915) – football player and coach
- Red Lanning – Major League Baseball pitcher and outfielder; played for Philadelphia Athletics
- Amos Magee (1993) – professional soccer player, coach; former head coach, Minnesota Thunder, and is Thunder's all-time scoring leader, United Soccer Leagues Hall of Fame
- Jeffrey Maier (2006) – college baseball player; notable for an instance of spectator interference at age 12; Wesleyan's all-time leader in hits
- Eric Mangini (1994) – former head coach, Cleveland Browns, New York Jets; NFL analyst
- Vince Pazzetti (1908–10) – elected to the College Football Hall of Fame
- Bill Rodgers (1970) – winner, four New York City Marathons, four Boston Marathons, one Fukuoka Marathon; only runner to hold championship of all three major marathons at same time
- Henri Salaun (1949) – squash player; four-time winner, U.S. Squash National Championships (1955, 1957, 1958 and 1961); won, inaugural U.S. Open (1954)
- Harry Van Surdam (1905) – elected to the College Football Hall of Fame
- James Wendell (1913) – Olympic silver medalist, 110-meter hurdles, 1912 Summer Olympics in Stockholm; one of teammates, General George S. Patton
- Mike Whalen (1983) – athlete and coach
- Jeff Wilner (1994) – National Football League player
- Bert Wilson (1897) – football player and coach
- Field Yates (2009) – sportswriter and analyst for ESPN

== Fictional characters ==
| Name | Connection to Wesleyan | Television show/film | Portrayed by |
|---|---|---|---|
| Alice | Alumna (B.A.) | How to Be Single | Dakota Johnson |
| David | Alumnus | How to Be Single | Damon Wayans, Jr. |
| Josh | Alumnus (B.A.) | How to Be Single | Nicholas Braun |
| Lily Aldrin (2000) | Alumna (B.A. in Art History) | How I Met Your Mother | Alyson Hannigan |
| Lyor Boone | Alumnus | Designated Survivor | Paulo Costanzo |
| Criss Chros | Alumnus (degree in Ethnomusicology) | 30 Rock | James Marsden |
| Maddie Coleman | Undergraduate student | As the World Turns | Alexandra Chando (2005–07, 2009–10) Kelly Barrett (2008–09) |
| Marshall Eriksen (2000) | Alumnus (B.A.) | How I Met Your Mother | Jason Segel |
| Marvin Wait-for-it Eriksen (2034) | Undergraduate student | How I Met Your Mother | Multiple actors |
| Hollyhock Manheim-Mannheim-Guerrero-Robinson-Zilberschlag-Hsung-Fonzarelli-McQuack | Undergraduate student | BoJack Horseman | Voiced by Aparna Nancherla |
| Ted Mosby (2000) | Alumnus (B.A. in Architecture) | How I Met Your Mother | Josh Radnor |
| Martha Reiser | Alumna | Senior Year | Mary Holland; Molly Brown (young) |
| Walter "Dot Com" Slattery (1993) | Alumnus (B.A.) | 30 Rock | Kevin Brown |
| Jay Whitman | Alumnus (B.A.) | Madam Secretary | Sebastian Arcelus |
