= Stephen Bronfman =

Canadian businessperson (born 1964)

Stephen Rosner Bronfman
- Born: 23 January 1964 (age 62); Montreal, Quebec, Canada
- Occupations: businessman, philanthropist
- Known for: Bronfman family
- Spouse: Claudine Blondin Bronfman
- Parents: Charles Bronfman (father); Barbara Baerwald (mother)

Stephen Rosner Bronfman (born 23 January 1964) is a Canadian businessperson, philanthropist, environmental activist and scion of the Bronfman family. He is the Chief Revenue Officer of the Liberal Party of Canada and was a senior advisor to Prime Minister, Justin Trudeau. He is also the last male Bronfman to have stayed in the family's ancestral city of Montreal.

== Early life ==
He was born at the Royal Victoria Hospital in Montreal to Barbara Baerwald, a New York native and Charles Bronfman, a Canadian billionaire. He is from a Jewish family and his parents married two years earlier at Temple Emanu-El in Manhattan in 1962. He is the grandson of Samuel Bronfman and Saidye Rosner Bronfman. He was raised in Westmount, an affluent Montreal enclave. The Canadian senator and Bronfman employee, Leo Kolber was his godparent. Growing up, he was not interested in joining the family business: "I'd see my dad come home in a suit and tie every night, and I didn't want to be like that." He credits his second trip to Israel, where he was a ranger's aide in the Negev desert as a formative experience: "I think that that trip to Israel when I was 19 really had a lot do with my involvement in environmental issues worldwide, the kind of work that I do in Canada" and that “I realized I love this. This is exciting, to be immersed in nature, to preserve it, to teach others about it.”

Bronfman completed his undergraduate studies at Williams College and returned to Montreal in 1986. He briefly worked in the marketing department of the Montreal Expos, then owned by his father. In 1990, he studied geology at Concordia University. In 1991, he joined private equity firm Claridge, which was founded by his father in 1987. He shifted his viewpoint about working in business, "I began to realize that the stuff done before me was pretty important and interesting."

== Career ==
Bronfman took over as head of the private equity firm Claridge and has served as its CEO since 1997. The firm had previously invested in artist tours by the Rolling Stones, Madonna, and Crosby, Stills, Nash and Young. Bronfman was responsible for increased investment positions in the high-end organic food and beverage industry, mainly through the creation of the Claridge Food Group. As executive chairman he has overseen the firm's direct private equity portfolio invest, amongst others, in Cirque du Soleil, CPI, Dick Clark Productions, TSN, Solotech, The Next Adventure, 49TH Parallel, Champlain Seafood, Circle Foods, NYSE, Tour Telus, Bassins dy Havre, Eagle Creek, Busbud, Cloudify, Facebook, Gigaspaces, Luxury Retreats. Claridge has been investing in Israel since the 1980s and left the market in 2006 after the sale of Koor Industries. It returned to Israel in 2015 as technology investors.

In 1999 he joined the board of Seagram, his family's conglomerate as a director: "It was a great honor, but the timing was terrible," as he lamented the sale of the company by his cousin, Edgar Bronfman Jr. He stayed with the board for eighteen months, "I know what I know. I'm very proud of my family history and have great relationships with my cousins."

He is the Chief Revenue Officer of the Liberal Party of Canada and a senior advisor to Prime Minister, Justin Trudeau. He is credited with transforming the party's finances into a considerable force and for his role in Trudeau's successful bid. He has also been described as instrumental in Trudeau's triumph in the 2015 Canadian federal election. He was named in the Paradise Papers in 2017, but he responded that he "has never funded nor used offshore trusts." He also distanced himself from the Kolber Trust that had been linked to Claridge, claiming that he had no "direct or indirect involvement" with the trust other than an arm's length loan made "over a quarter century ago" that was repaid five months later.

In 2010 he unsuccessfully tried to buy the Montreal Canadiens of the National Hockey League (NHL). Since the departure of the Expos, he has been involved in initiatives aiming to bring a Major League Baseball expansion team to Montreal. In 2022, Major League Baseball rejected Bronfman's proposal for Tampa Bay Rays to play half of its home games in Montreal at a new baseball stadium in the city.

== Personal life ==
He is married to Claudine Blondin Bronfman, a French Canadian and they have four children together, Alexandra Bronfman, Samuel Rosner Bronfman, Olivia Bronfman, and Isabella Bronfman. They raise their children bilingually. His wife is "Jewish by choice" and they are raising their children in the Jewish faith. They live in Westmount, in the former home of Bronfman's grandparents, Samuel and Saidye.

=== Philanthropy ===
Bronfman and his wife Claudine have donated over $100 million to various charitable causes over the past two decades. In 2002 he founded The Charles Bronfman Prize with his sister, Ellen Bronfman Hauptman, and brother-in-law, Andrew Hauptman in honour of his father. Since 2004, the $100, 000 prize has been awarded to individuals "whose accomplishments enrich Jewish life." Notable recipients include Amy Bach, Etgar Keret, Becca Heller, Eric Rosenthal, Jared Genser, Sasha Chanoff, Amitai Ziv, Alon Tal and Jay Feinberg.

He is also involved in Birthright Israel, a free program for young Jewish people in the diaspora to visit Israel for ten days. The program was co-founded by his father in 1994. In 2023, together with his wife, his sister and brother-in-law, he made a "transformational gift" to the organisation which will support a five-year greening project, where the organisation will integrate environmental content and activities into Israel visits. He has also been supporting the David Suzuki Foundation, a non-profit environmental organization for over twenty-five years. In addition he is responsible for the Stephen Bronfman Scholarship in Environmental Studies, a $7,500 second-year or later graduate scholarship in environmental studies.

He is also a donor to the Canadian Centre for Architecture and sits on its board of trustees. In addition, each year, the Claudine and Stephen Bronfman Fellowship in Contemporary Art is awarded to two emerging artists in Montreal — one from Université du Québec à Montréal and one from Concordia University. Since 2009, The Claudine and Stephen Bronfman Family Foundation works in collaboration with the Musée d'art contemporain de Montréal to offer the SéminArts educational program on the art of collecting contemporary art.
