= Stephen Engel (disambiguation) =

Stephen, Steve or Steven Engel may refer to:

- Stephen Engel, American TV producer and writer
- Stephen M. Engel, American academic and political scientist
- Steve Engel (born 1961), American baseball player
- Steven Engel (born 1974), American lawyer and former Justice Department official
