= The Religious Institute on Sexual Morality, Justice, and Healing =

American religious organization

Religious Institute
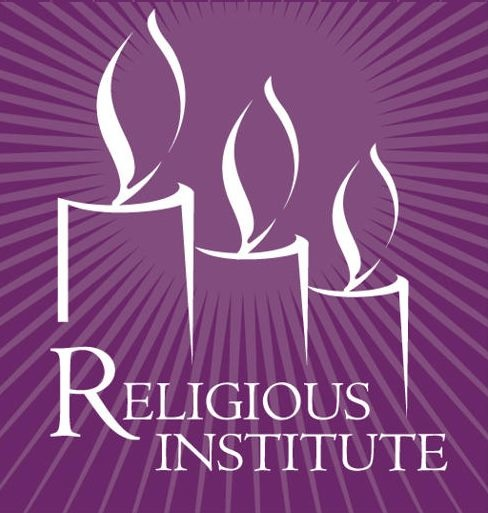
- Founded: 2001
- Founder: Rev. Dr. Debra Haffner & Rev. Dr. Larry Greenfield
- Location: Bridgeport, Connecticut, United States
- Key people: Rev. Marie Alford-Harkeyy (President & CEO)
- Website: religiousinstitute.org

The Religious Institute, Inc. is a progressive American multi-faith organization dedicated to advocating for sexual health, education, and justice in faith communities and society. It was co-founded in 2001 by Debra Haffner, a Unitarian Universalist minister and sexologist, and Larry Greenfield, an American Baptist minister and theologian.

The Religious Institute's initial purpose is "to change the way America understands the relationship of sexuality and religion". Among its objectives are building a network of clergy and other religious leaders who are dedicated to sexual justice, promoting sexuality education in faith communities, and educating policymakers and the general public about a progressive religious view of sexuality.

== History ==
At its inception, the Religious Institute was a program of Christian Community, Inc. That organization became defunct in February 2012. In March 2012, the Religious Institute incorporated as an independent organization, Religious Institute, Inc, and received IRS recognition as a non-profit educational organization shortly thereafter.

== Issues ==
The Religious Institute addresses a variety of sexual and reproductive justice concerns through advocacy, education, and development of resources as well as through partnerships with clergy and congregations, national religious organizations, and sexual and reproductive health organization.

== Services ==
=== Technical assistance ===
The Religious Institute staff work with clergy, congregations, and denominational bodies on a one-time, short-term, or long-term basis to address sexuality issues. Staff can help choose or plan curricula, develop safe congregation policies, identify local consultants or referral sources, and respond to difficult situations and circumstances around a sexuality issue.

=== Training workshops and speaking engagements ===
The Religious Institute provides keynote speakers and workshop leaders for congregations as well as regional and national meetings on sexuality, spirituality, and religion; sexuality education for youth, parents, and adults; building sexually healthy faith communities; and other sexuality and religion topics.

=== Media ===
Religious Institute staff assist the media in identifying spokespeople from various denominations to speak on sexual justice issues.

=== Clearinghouse ===
The Religious Institute's clearinghouse includes information on sexuality and religion, including practices, resources, trends, and current controversies.
