= Edward Bennett Rosa =

American physicist

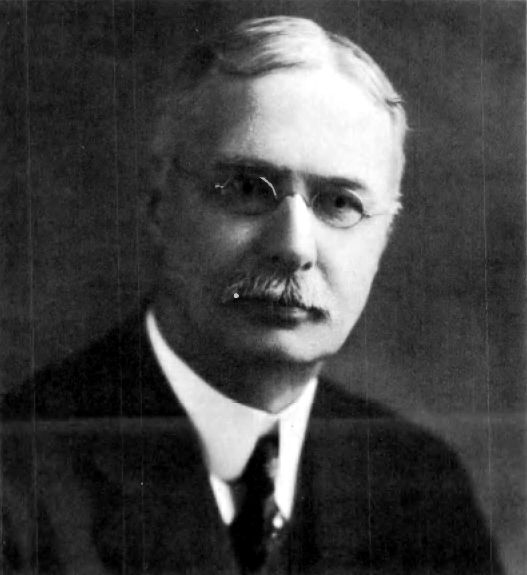
Edward Bennett Rosa, 1915

Edward Bennett Rosa (4 October 1873, Rogersville, Steuben County – 17 May 1921, Washington, D. C.) was an American physicist, specialising in measurement science.

He received B.S. at Wesleyan University (1886) and taught physics at a school in Providence, Rhode Island before graduate studies in physics at Johns Hopkins University, obtaining a Ph.D. in 1891 on the thesis entitled The Specific Inductive Capacity of Electrolytes, advised by Henry Augustus Rowland. After a short stay at University of Wisconsin (1890) he was professor of physics at Wesleyan University (1891–1901) where he and Wilbur Olin Atwater developed a respiration calorimeter which for human beings confirmed conservation of energy laws and allowed for calculation of caloric values of different foods. He also made an early curve tracer for alternating currents. He then joined as head of the electrical research division at National Bureau of Standards (1901) where he, Noah Ernest Dorsey and Frederick Grover, developed a variety of measurement devices. With George Wood Vinal he made an ammeter based on a silver voltameter. He also headed the Safety Code division that defined the National Electrical Code. Rosa died while at work.

== Awards ==
- Elliott Cresson Medal of the Franklin Institute 1898 for the respiration calorimeter
- Fellow of the American Institute of Electrical Engineers and American Physical Society
- Elected to the National Academy of Sciences 1913
- The E. B. Rosa Award is offered by National Institute of Standards and Technology.
