= Andrew Pergiovanni =

American composer (born 1985)

Andrew Joseph Pergiovanni (born 29 January 1985) is an American composer. He has written in the "modern classical" and "popular" idioms. Some works of both styles are available on the iTunes music store.

While an undergraduate at Wesleyan University, he studied composition with Neely Bruce and Angel Gil-Ordoñez. His senior project was to compose and produce three original pieces in the pop style. After presenting the pieces in May 2007, he worked on them further to be able to release a small album titled after the first track, Setting Sun. While pursuing music education at Central Connecticut State University, he studied composition with Charles Menoche and Brian Kershner. After deciding to pursue composition full-time, he was admitted to the Hartt School of Music at the University of Hartford. He has studied with Robert Carl, Tawnie Olson, Ken Steen and currently with David Macbride. His piece Asylum Cafeteria for string quartet was recently premiered at the Hartt School.

On April 30, 2011, pianists Jonathan Moyer and Grace Smith premiered three pieces from Pergiovanni's suite "Aidan Draws Monsters" for solo piano, which was composed in direct aesthetic response to the drawings of Aidan Reed. The recordings from this concert are available for purchase on iTunes, and the album's sales will benefit Aidan Reed and family. YouTube videos of the event are available.

On November 9, 2011, soprano Amanda Kohl and a string quartet composed of Luciana Arraes, Rebekah Butler, Mary Scripko and Danielle Karppala premiered "Agnus Dei", the focal movement from Pergiovanni's Mass of Catharsis. The performance, which took place at the Renee Samuels Center in West Hartford, CT as part of the bi-annual Public Works Concert is available on YouTube, along with Pergiovanni's introductory remarks.

Besides composing, Pergiovanni is a cantor at Corpus Christi Church in Wethersfield, Connecticut. In his remarks before the premiere of the Mass of Catharsis, it was revealed that his experience singing for funeral services and witnessing the grief of those present inspired the emotionally loaded drive of the work.
