= Isaac J. Lansing =

Pastor and president of Clark Atlanta University

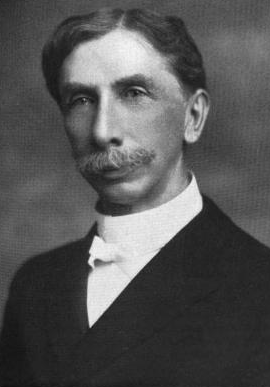
- Born: 1846; Watervliet, New York
- Died: 1920 (aged 73–74)
- Occupation: Methodist Episcopal Church Pastor
- Known for: President of Clark Atlanta University

Isaac J. Lansing (1846–1920) was the president of Clark Atlanta University from 1874 to 1876, and the pastor at Park Street Church in Boston, Massachusetts from 1893 to 1897.

Isaac Lansing was born in 1846 in Watervliet, New York. He graduated from Wesleyan University in 1872 as valedictorian and was a graduate student there from 1872 to 1873. He received a master's degree from the university in 1875. He served as a Methodist Episcopal minister in the New York East, Georgia, and Savannah Conferences from 1873 to 1886. During this period, Lansing was appointed President of Clark Atlanta University in 1874 and served until 1876. He served also as acting Assistant Secretary of the Freedmen's Aid Society of the Methodist Episcopal Church from 1876 to 1878. Lansing served as pastor at Park Street Church in Boston, Massachusetts from 1893 to 1897. He later served as pastor of the Green Ridge Presbyterian Church in Scranton, Pennsylvania. Lansing received an honorary D.D. from Lafayette College in 1909. He died in 1920.

== Works by Lansing ==
- The duty of the church toward the present temperance movement. An address to the New York M.E. Preachers' meeting. (New York, National Temperance Society, 1874) (page images at HathiTrust)
- Romanism and the Republic: A Discussion of the Purposes, Assumptions, Principles and Methods of the Roman Catholic Hierarchy (1890) Online
- Why Christianity did not prevent the war (George H. Doran Company, 1918)
- The social program of the Lord's prayer, by I. J. Lansing. (New York, Association press, 1912) (page images at HathiTrust)
