= Natalia Alonso =

American ballet dancer

- Born: October 1 New York, NY
- Career
- Current group: "Nikolai and the Others"
- Former groups: Complexions Contemporary Ballet; Ballet Hispanico
- Dances: Contemporary Ballet
- Website: www.nataliaalonso.com

Natalia Alonso is an American professional dancer and actress, and is appearing as Maria Tallchief in the upcoming play Nikolai and the Others at Lincoln Center Theater.

== Career ==
A native New Yorker of Spanish descent, Alonso began her formal dance studies with Kaleria Fedicheva of the Kirov Ballet at the age of 9. She continued her studies with Irina Lebedeva, as well as at the Boston Ballet and at the Alvin Ailey American Dance Center. After suffering a knee injury, Natalia took a step back from dance and pursued an economics degree from Wesleyan University.

After graduation, Alonso joined Ballet Hispanico, directed by Tina Ramirez, based in New York City. With the company, Alonso performed both internationally and domestically, and in such notable theatres as the Kennedy Center, Jazz at Lincoln Center, the Joyce Theatre, and New York City Center.

In 2004, Ramirez offered Alonso a solo, Llamada, choreographed by the Kansas City Ballet's artistic director, William Whitener. When Whitener declined to allow Alonso to perform in the piece because he did not know her, she flew at her own expense to St. Louis, where his company was performing, to rehearse with him. He gave her his approval after just one afternoon: "She is a gifted artist who is completely invested in the process," he said. "And like all the great ones," he adds, "her feet are firmly planted on the ground."

In the piece Palladium Nights, Alonso was reviewed "as a flame on the dance floor; she also gives the most nuanced performance—wholeheartedly joyous when the music takes her, introspective when she dances alone onstage...." She remained a principal dancer of the company until 2008, "maturing into a highly versatile dancer distinguished by her long, clean, polished line; hip-swiveling bravado; and stunning stage magnetism."

In 2008, Alonso joined Complexions Contemporary Ballet, directed by Dwight Rhoden and Desmond Richardson. Natalia appeared the cover of the August 2008 edition of Dance Magazine, in which she explained her decision to transition from Ballet Hispanico to Complexions. On what caught her eye about Complexions, Alonso said "I was attracted to the style of repertory and its fusion of ballet with other types of contemporary dance styles and themes." She said, while on tour with the company in Australia in 2009, "I am amazed by the calibre of each individual dancer and artist. The company has always been known for housing the world’s best dancers and the directors encourage excellence."

Because of her exposure to a number of different methods of dance, Alonso was able to quickly adapt to the physically demanding nature of Complexions' choreography. A review of Mirror Me, a creation of Juan Rodriguez, a guest choreographer, described Alonso's performance as such: "Alonso’s plies are particularly slow and decadent, as though she were a spoon slicing into warm pumpkin pie." However, Complexions has not always been reviewed favorably, at one time described "a man’s world. The women are instruments; the men play them."" The review goes on to describe the choreography as "far more monocultural than it claims to be. Its women are by no means only passive, but most of the partnering is grossly manipulative."

Alonso appeared on the Winter 2011 cover of Discount Dance Supply, one of the largest distributed dance supply catalogs in the United States. Alonso also appears in a digital short for the company. Discount Dance Supply conducted an interview with Alonso for the shoot, in which she describes how she became involved in dance, her favorite qualities, and the different styles each dancer brings to rehearsal.

In February 2013, it was announced that Alonso was joining the cast of the play Nikolai and the Others. Written by Richard Nelson (playwright) and directed by David Cromer, the play imagines the relationships between a close-knit group of Russian emigres, including choreographer George Balanchine (played by Michael Cerveris), composer Igor Stravinsky, and their "friends, lovers, wives and ex-wives, partners, supporters and dancer... at the time of their historic collaboration on the Orpheus."

== Other notable work ==
Alonso has worked with other choreographers such as Alonzo King, Bradley Shelver, and George Faison while on tour with Aretha Franklin. She also has been a Gyrotonic instructor since 2005 and trains other dancers in strengthening techniques. She also appeared in Telemundo "Up Front" specials and in independent films.

=== Appearances ===
"Nikolai and the Others," [February 2013 - (present)]

1. Complexions Contemporary Ballet, [August 2008 - 2012]
2. Ballet Hispanico of NY, (January 2001 - 2008) -- Former principal dancer, featured spokesperson in print and television adds works by Ann Reinking, Ramon Oller, Pedro Ruiz, Alex Magno, Sergio Trujillo
3. Bradley Shelver Contemporary Dance, [2004 - (present)]
4. Telemundo "Up Front", (2004, 2005, and 2006) -- featured dancer with guest musical artists
5. Fringe Festival, (July 2000) -- appearing in works by Vickie Mendoza
6. Aretha Franklin Tour (1999) -- featured dancer, choreography by George Faison

=== Film and TV credits ===
1. Setting the Stage, PBS(Special) (2007) -- private interview on behalf of Ballet Hispanico
2. Everything is One, Pete Francis- (Music Video) (2005) -- choreography by Sergio Trujillo, featured dancer and actress
3. Come Mute, directed by Cheryl Dunn (Film) (2003), featured dancer
4. Maine Merengue, (Film) (1999) -- directed by Ian Kornblooth, featured actress

=== Education and training ===
- Wesleyan University, (1996-2000) - B.A., Economics; Concentration in Dance
- Alvin Ailey American Dance Center, (Summers 1996–99)
- Boston Ballet School, (Summers 1994–95)
- Irina Lebedeva Irina Lebedeva, (1993-1996)
- Fedicheva Ballet School, (1987-1993)

=== Teaching experience ===
Alonso teaches, or has taught, ballet and modern techniques at the following schools:

- Complexions Contemporary Ballet Summer Intensive (2009–11)
- Two Worlds Dance - 2002–present
- The Juilliard School - 2007
- Perry Mansfield Summer Program - 2006-2001
