= Debra Haffner =

Rev. Debra Haffner
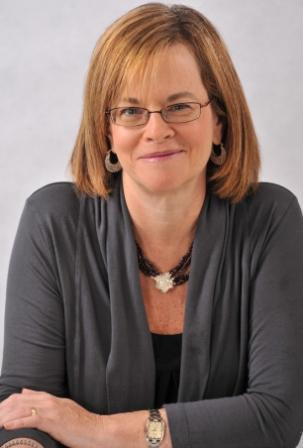
- Education: Yale University (MPH); Wesleyan University; Union Theological Seminary (M.Div.)
- Occupations: President and CEO of Religious Institute, Inc., retired
- Website: www.religiousinstitute.org

Debra W. Haffner (born 1954) is co-founder and president emerita of the Religious Institute, Inc. A sexologist and ordained Unitarian Universalist minister, she was the endorsed community minister with the Unitarian Church in Westport, Connecticut. Haffner retired from the Religious Institute on April 30, 2016. She became the settled minister at the Unitarian Universalist Church in Reston, Virginia in August 2016 and served there through June 2021. Under her leadership, UUCR was named a breakthrough congregation by the UUA for her creation of the first Pride Festival in Reston. From 2022 to 2024, she was the interim minister at the Unitarian Universalist Fellowship in Huntington, NY. Since September 2024, she has been the Senior Co-Minister of the First Unitarian Universalist Society of Newton, MA with her spouse Joel G. Miller.

== Early life and education ==
Haffner was born in 1954 in Morristown, New Jersey. She attended Norwalk, Connecticut public schools, and graduated from Wesleyan University in Middletown, Connecticut in 1975. Haffner received her Masters of Divinity (M.Div.) from Union Theological Seminary. She received a Masters of Public Health from the Yale University School of Medicine. She was a Research Fellow at the Yale Divinity School in 1996–97. Haffner received an honorary Doctor of Public Service from Widener University in 2011. Haffner received her Doctorate of Ministry from the Pacific School of Religion in 2016.

== Career ==
Haffner, has taught at Yale Divinity School, Meadville Lombard Theological School, and Pacific School of Religion, and was an adjunct lecturer/visiting professor at Union Theological Seminary. Works she has authored include several guides for congregations on sexuality.

In 2001, Haffner co-founded the Religious Institute on Sexual Morality, Justice, and Healing with Larry Greenfield. The Religious Institute, Inc. was established as an independent 501(c)(3) nonprofit organization on March 6, 2012. The organization's stated mission is to advocate for sexual health, education, and justice in faith communities and society.

Prior to founding the Religious Institute and entering ministry, Haffner was President and Chief Executive Officer of SIECUS, the Sexuality Information and Education Council of the United States (1988-2000), Director of Information and Education for the Center for Population Options, Director of Community Services and Public Relations, Planned Parenthood of Metropolitan Washington. She has also worked at the Bureau of Community Health Services at the U.S. Public Health Service, and at The Population Institute.

=== Sexuality education ===
Haffner has been a sexuality educator since the mid-1970s. She was an AASECT certified sexuality educator until she became a full time parish minister.

Her contributions to the field of sexuality education include:

- Creating the first educators' handbook for Planned Parenthood in 1981.
- Directing the nation's first conference on AIDS and Adolescents in 1986 for the Center for Population Options.
- Co-authoring the first national study on the costs of teenage childbearing with Martha Burt from the Urban Institute.

While at SIECUS, she created the National Guidelines for Comprehensive Sexuality Education, which Haffner co-authored with Dr. William Yarber of Indiana University, the National Commission on Adolescent Sexual Health and the National Coalition to Support Sexuality Education.

=== Sexually healthy faith communities ===
Haffner's most recent work in sexuality focused on helping faith communities understand the relationship between sexuality and religion and creating sexually healthy faith communities. In 1999, she conceived of the project to develop a multifaith progressive statement on sexuality and religion and coordinated the development of the Religious Declaration on Sexual Morality, Justice, and Healing. Written with the input of twenty leading theologians, the Religious Declaration first appeared in The New York Times on January 25, 2000 endorsed by more than 800 religious leaders. As of January 2016 when she retired from the Religious Institute, more than 9,000 religious leaders from more than 70 denominations had endorsed the Religious Declaration.

"Sexuality education is a religious issue," Haffner has publicly stated. "We have a commitment to helping young people develop a moral conscience, including an ability to make healthy decisions. We have a religious commitment to truth telling, which means that people should have full and accurate information, not biased and censored."

In collaboration with the New England Adolescent Research Institute (NEARI), Haffner developed a course entitled Balancing Acts that is designed to train ministers and other religious professionals in how to keep children and youth safe from sexual abuse. Haffner works frequently with congregations who are struggling with including sex offenders in their congregations, and in this program, she addresses the concerns these faith communities face when discerning how to discern appropriate involvement for these individuals. It suggests the formation of a "limited access agreement" to determine what activities the individual may participate in and suggests rules and guidelines to prevent the occurrence of future abuse. "Every place of worship needs a safe-congregation policy," Haffner said.

== Published work ==
Haffner has written two books for parents: From Diapers to Dating: A Parent's Guide to Raising Sexually Healthy Children and Beyond the Big Talk: Every Parent's Guide to Raising Sexually Healthy Teens. From Diapers has been translated into 12 languages. The Chinese adaptation has sold more than 100,000 copies. Haffner also authored Bisexuality: Making the Invisible Visible in Faith Communities with Marie Alford-Harkey. This book was published in 2014. It was the first book of its kind.

== Recognition ==
Hafner's blog, Sexuality and Religion: What's the Connection?, won a number of the 2008 UU Blog Awards.

Haffner was honored by the World Association for Sexual Health with their Gold Medal for Lifetime Achievement. Her papers are being archived by the Schlessinger Library at Harvard University.

== Media ==
Haffner was a national contributor to the Huffington Post, RH Reality Check and the Newsweek/Washington Post blog, On Faith.
