= Ben Weiner =

American painter

Ben Weiner (born November 10, 1980) is an American contemporary artist.

Weiner was born in Burlington, Vermont, and grew up in Dobbs Ferry, New York. He graduated from Wesleyan University in 2003 and completed an independent study in painting at the Universidad de las Americas Puebla, Mexico. In 2003, Weiner worked as an assistant in the studio of Jeff Koons.

Blobs of paint can appear as organic terrains and hyperpigmented, trompe-l'œil manscapes. His paintings chart the evolving topologrqphy of his platelet, with the process creation of one painting generating source imagery for the next. Weiner's works weld glamour with the organic while reconsidering the cycle of nature and artificiality. His work also focuses on the daily experience of disassociation and imitation in the digital age, as well as the merging of object, subject and medium.

Weiner's work has been included in exhibitions at The Aldrich Contemporary Art Museum, The Carnegie Art Museum (Oxnard, California), The Riverside Art Museum, and Artspace. His work is in collections including Sammlung Mondstudio (Germany), Progressive Insurance (Ohio), and the Frederick R. Weisman Foundation.

Weiner also designed video projections for the interdisciplinary theatrical production of La Historia de Llorar por El by Ignacio Apolo.
