= Wendy Spero =

Wendy Spero is an actress, comedian, and writer who has performed on NPR, Comedy Central, VH1, NBC, and the Food Network. Her one woman show, "Who's Your Daddy?" was produced at Edinburgh Fringe Festival after a year-long run at the Upright Citizens Brigade Theater in New York in 2004. She wrote a memoir, Microthrills: True Stories from a Life of Small Highs, in 2006.
