= Stephen M. Engel =

Stephen Engel
- Born: Stephen Marcus Engel; Colts Neck, New Jersey, U.S.
- Occupations: Professor, political scientist

Academic background
- Education: Wesleyan University; New York University; Yale University
- Thesis: 'A Mere Party Machine?' Judicial Authority, Party Development, and the Changing Politics of Attacking the Courts

Academic work
- Institutions: Marquette University (2009–2011); Bates College (2011–present)
- Main interests: Constitutional law American political development Sexuality politics
- Notable ideas: "Less-than-whole citizens"

Stephen Marcus Engel is an American academic and political scientist who is currently a professor of politics at Bates College in Lewiston, Maine. He is an affiliated scholar with the American Bar Association.

Engel's debut work, American Politicians Confront the Court: Opposition Politics and the Changing Responses to Judicial Power covered separation of powers in American political development (APD). His third book, Fragmented Citizens: The Changing Landscape of Gay and Lesbian Lives (2016), covered "Less-than-whole citizens".

== Academic career ==
Stephen Marcus Engel graduated from Wesleyan University in the College of Social Studies in 1998. He received his master's degree from New York University (NYU) in 2001 in humanities and social thought. After a brief stint working at NYU, Engel attended Yale University in New Haven, Connecticut where he received his M.A., MPhil., and PhD in political science during the years 2005, 2006, and 2009, respectively.

Upon receiving his doctorate, he was appointed as an assistant professor of political science at Marquette University in Milwaukee, Wisconsin. During the summer of 2010, he went to New York City to work as a research scholar at the School of International and Public Affairs of Columbia University before concluding his professorship at Marquette in 2011. He went on to become a research scholar at the American Bar Association from August 2013 to July 2014.

In August 2011, he was appointed to the politics faculty of Bates College in Lewiston, Maine as an assistant professor. During the same year, he was designated an affiliated scholar of the American Bar Association. On August 27, 2015, Engel was promoted to associate professor with tenure. As of August 2015, he is the Chair of the Politics Department of Bates College.

== Work and ideas ==
Engel's main research topics focus on the sociopolitical mobilization of the LGBTQ community, constitutional law, and political development.

In Engel's third book, Fragmented Citizens: The Changing Landscape of Gay and Lesbian Lives, he discusses the increase in rights for same-sex couples in the late 2000s and early 2010s. He referred to the gay and lesbian couples of America as the titular "fragmented citizens", and "Less-than-whole citizens", referring to the social change of their societal development.

== Personal life ==
Engel resides in Portland, Maine.

== Selected bibliography ==
Books

- Engel, Stephen. 2001. "The Unfinished Revolution: Social Movement Theory and the Gay and Lesbian Movement." New York: Cambridge University Press.
- Engel, Stephen. 2011. "American Politicians Confront the Court: Opposition Politics and the Changing Responses to Judicial Power." New York: Cambridge University Press.
- Engel, Stephen. 2016. "Fragmented Citizens: The Changing Landscape of Lesbian and Gay Lives." New York: New York University Press.
- Engel, Stephen & Lyle, Timothy. 2017. "Fucking With Dignity: Public Sex, Queer Intimate Kinship, and How the AIDS Epidemic Bathhouse Closures Constituted a Dignity Taking." Chicago-Kent Law Review.

== See also ==
- List of Wesleyan University alumni
- List of New York University alumni
- List of Yale University alumni
- List of Marquette University people
- List of Bates College people
