= Spencer Reece =

Poet and presbyter

Spencer Reece is a poet and presbyter who lives in Wickford, Rhode Island. He graduated from Wesleyan University (1985). Reece received his M.A. from the University of York, England, his M.T.S. from the Harvard Divinity School, and a M.Div. from the Berkeley Divinity School at Yale Divinity School. At Wesleyan, Spencer took a class in writing verse with Pulitzer Prize-winning writer Annie Dillard (Tinker at Pilgrim Creek), whom he describes as "an early encourager," along with James Merrill, the Stonington poet with whom Spencer corresponded.

His 2004 book, The Clerk's Tale, was published by the Houghton Mifflin Company (A Mariner Original). The Clerk's Tale was the winner of the Bread Loaf Writers' Conference Bakeless Prize and was judged by former U.S. poet laureate Louise Glück. The title poem describes a day in the life at a store in the Mall of America. Reece worked for many years as a sales associate at Brooks Brothers in the Mall. James Franco based his short film on the title poem. Reece's second book, The Road to Emmaus, was published by Farrar, Straus & Giroux in April 2014. His work has appeared in Boulevard, The New Yorker and The American Poetry Review. The Road to Emmaus was a long list nominee for the National Book Award and a finalist for the Griffin Prize in Canada.

2017 saw the publication of Counting Time like People Count Stars: Poems by the Girls of Little Roses, San Pedro Sula, Honduras (Tia Chucha Press). This anthology of poems in Spanish with English translations was edited by Reece. The project was born from his time teaching at the Orphanage of Our Little Roses in Honduras.

In 2019, Common Prayer: Reflections on Episcopal Worship was published, containing a chapter by Reece.

In 2022, Seven Stories Press published The Secret Gospel of Mark: A Poet's Memoir. A collection of watercolors and quotes was also published that year, All The Beauty Still Left: A Poet's Painted Book of Hours by Turtle Point Press. In 2024, Farrar, Straus & Giroux published his third collection of poems, Acts.

Reece was ordained a priest in the Episcopal Church in 2011. He served as priest at the Spanish Episcopal Church for ten years. From 2020 to 2022, he served as the interim priest at Saint Mark's/San Marcos in Jackson Heights, Queens, a bilingual parish that lost their priest from the Covid-19 pandemic. In 2023, he became the vicar of Saint Paul's, in Wickford, Rhode Island, serving the Bishop of Rhode Island.

== Awards ==
- American Academy of Arts and Letters Award in Literature, 2016
- Shortlisted for the 2015 Griffin Poetry Prize for The Road to Emmaus
- Longlist nominee for National Book 2014 for The Road to Emmaus
- Recipient of the Witter Bynner Prize administered by the Library of Congress.
- Recipient of the Pushcart Prize in 2009.
- Recipient of a Whiting Award in 2005 for poetry.
- Winner of the Bread Loaf Writers' Conference Bakeless Prize for 2004.
- Recipient of a Guggenheim Fellowship.
- Recipient of a National Endowment for the Arts poetry fellowship.
- Recipient of an Amy Lowell Traveling Grant.
