= James William Chichetto =

American poet and Catholic priest

James William Chichetto is an American poet, artist, Professor of Communications, and a Catholic priest of the Congregation of Holy Cross, an international religious community that founded and sponsors the University of Notre Dame, Stonehill College, the University of Portland, and King's College, among others.

== Biography ==
He was born in 1941 in Boston, Massachusetts, and grew up in The Berkshires. He graduated from Stonehill College and studied theology at Holy Cross College in Washington, D.C., whose faculty later became part of the Theology Department at the University of Notre Dame. He did further graduate studies at Catholic University, Chicago University (South Asian Languages and Civilization), and Wesleyan University. Following his ordination, he worked in Peru, South America, for three years before getting ill, which experience he recounts in a novel, Lazaro. He is the author of several books of poems, most notably a multi-volume epic poem, The Dream of Norumbega: An Epic Poem on the United States of America, that explores the historical and cultural foundation of the United States, focusing on themes of American identity, history, and the experience of its indigenous peoples. In the Dream, he draws readers into a land of spirits to commune with the ghosts of several American historical characters, including Captain John Smith, General Winfield Scott, George Washington, Black Elk, Emily Dickinson, Ona Judge, Sitting Bull, Massasoit, and Abraham Lincoln. To date, four volumes of the work (to be issued incrementally) have been published. The poet and critic Robert Peters, who has reviewed Chichetto's earlier works, called "The Dream" a contemporary masterpiece. "He has taken the 'voice portrait genre' [created by Peters] to new directions," notes Peters. Chichetto is a recipient of numerous grants and is currently a professor of Communications at Stonehill College.

== Selected works ==
- Poems, Commonwealth Press (1972)
- Stones, a Litany (1980) ISBN 0-939622-06-8
- Dialogue: Emily Dickinson and Christopher Cauldwell, Commonwealth Press (1982)
- Gilgamesh and Other Poems (1983) ISBN 0-939622-38-6
- Victims (1987) ISBN 0-9618657-1-7
- Homage to Father Edward Sorin (1992, 98) ISBN 0-9618657-4-1
- Reckoning Genocide (2002) ISBN 1-884710-34-4
- Foreword to Perversions of Justice (2002) ISBN 0-87286-416-2
- Four Chinese American and Chinese Poets, ed. w/ Emily Yau (2014) ISBN 978-0-9618657-8-8
- Preface to All For Her (2018) ISBN 978-1-59471-885-4
- The Dream of Norumbega, an Epic Poem on The United States of America Volumes I, II, III, IV (2000,'05,'08,'20) ISBN 0-9618657-7-6
- Blood Accounts (2020) ISBN 978-93-89690-85-9
- George Washington's Wars With His Slave, Ona Judge (2021) ISBN 978-81-8253-704-0
- Emily Dickinson at Wounded Knee (2026) ISBN 978-81-8253-704-0

== Other selected publications ==
The Boston Phoenix; The Manhattan Review; The Other Side; International Voices Review; The Colorado Review; America Magazine; Poem Magazine; Harper's Magazine; The Tablet (London); The Connecticut Poetry Review; Mr. Cogito; The Boston Globe; Christian Century; Combat Literary Magazine; The Vision: Native American Poetry Anthology; Blood to Remember: American Poets on the Holocaust; Commonweal; Gargoyle Magazine (Cambridge); American Poets of the 1990s; And What Rough Beast: Poems at the End of the Century; The National Catholic Reporter; East West Literary Journal; Anthology of Magazine Verse Yearbook of American Poetry (1986–88), etc.

== Critical reception and style ==
Dan Carr, poet and editor (Golgonooza Letter and Foundry Press) and one of his first publishers (Stones, A Litany), notes how Chichetto's poems are "well crafted and strong," especially in regard to their "lyrical power" and "elegiac sympathy" for the exploited and defeated. He also notes that his longest poem, "Stones, A Litany," about the great stones of Cuzco, Peru, has "been performed successfully with music."

Edwin Honig, poet, playwright, and professor emeritus (Brown University), says this about his earlier work, Victims: "This is an impressive selection of work by a vigorous young talent....Evocations of Sitting Bull and Herman Melville spin from Chichetto's mind -- a stark energy fuses with his special tenderness. Chichetto's forms are varied and skilled...I will watch for more of his work."

Of all the observers of Chichetto's earlier poetry, possibly Robert Peters, poet, critic, and professor emeritus (UCLA, Irvine), has been the most insightful, supportive, and nuanced in appraising it. For example, he praises him for "staging himself through Gilgamesh in Gilgamesh and Other Poems, notes the "beauty of the poems" in general, and singles out lines from his "favorite poem" ("Sugar Cane Fields in Peru").

In Homage to Father Edward Sorin, Peters quotes lines from one of the longer poems of the work, "Fr. Sorin and the Great Fire at Notre Dame, 1879" ("possibly the best"), noting the book as a whole "is an important contribution to the 'voice portrait' genre":

He spits into some ashes,
turns cinder over
with his foot. He pushes
some strands of hair
from his forehead, then
brushes his shoulder.
He reaches into the debris
for an old door knob,
then motionless stands over
the door
in black silence.

Later he walks toward the lakes.
He looks out over the plowlines
and across the great silence of water.
"The sky of Indiana still stirs in the lakes," he thinks.
"I can still labor."
That night, throwing his cassock on a chair,
he strips to his waist to wash.

Currently four volumes of Chichetto's epic poem, The Dream of Norumbega, are out in paperback. Book IV was reissued under a different publisher and title, George Washington's Wars With His Slave, Ona Judge. The first chapter (Emily Dickinson at Wounded Knee) of Book V was published separately in 2026.

== Selected external links ==
- Harris Collection, Brown University/CT. POETRY REVIEW Archives/art
- Contemporary Authors Series, Volume 191
- Contemporary Authors, New Revised Series, Volume 165.
- Robert Peters Papers/ UC, San Diego
- Poets and Writers Directory
- Poets House
- Directory of American Scholars, Volume 2,
- International Who's Who of Authors and Writers, 2008, Routledge
