= Chuck Pagano (ESPN) =

ESPN executive

- Education: University of Hartford; Wesleyan University
- Employer: ESPN
- Title: Former executive vice president of technology and chief technology officer

Charles E. Pagano is the former executive vice president of technology and chief technology officer of ESPN. He was promoted to this position in 2011 from his previous position as executive vice president of technology, engineering and operations and retained that position during ESPN's January 2012 executive restructuring. He retired in February 2015.

Pagano had been with ESPN since before it began broadcasting, having joined as a technical director in 1979. He held a variety of technical positions and became head of ESPN's new technology division in 2005. Pagano has been credited with important roles in the building of ESPN's production facilities in Los Angeles (the first 1080p HD facility in the world) and Bristol, Connecticut, ESPN's move to high-definition television, and the development of ESPN 3D, the first 3D television network in the U.S. He was named to the Sporting News "Power 100" list in 2003 and 2006.

A native of Waterbury, Connecticut, Pagano received a Bachelor of Science degree in electrical engineering in 1984, and a Master of Science degree in organizational psychology in 2007, both from the University of Hartford and also studies astronomy in the Graduate Liberal Studies Program at Wesleyan University.
