= Jim Sugar =

American photographer

James "Jim" Sugar is an American photographer, known for his work on National Geographic.

== Education ==
Sugar graduated with honours from Wesleyan University. He lives in Mill Valley, California.

== Work ==
He began his internship with National Geographic in 1967, and was given a full-time contract in 1969. That year he spent 3 months in Ireland and took over 11,000 photos, 24 of which made the cover story of National Geographic. In 2009, he visited Ireland again as the subject of the RTE documentary Summer of 69.

For National Geographic Sugar covered more than 20 stories and worked on a number of books, until he finally left the society in 1992.

HIs film Swimming: Mind-Body-Spirit was exhibited at the 2014 Mill Valley Festival.
