= William Callyhan Robinson =

American jurist and academic

William Callyhan Robinson (born 26 July 1834, at Norwich, Connecticut; d. 6 November 1911, at Washington, D.C.) was an American jurist and academic.

== Life ==
After studies at Norwich Academy and Williston Seminary, he matriculated at Wesleyan University in 1850, leaving the college at the close of his sophomore year in 1852. Subsequently, Robinson entered Dartmouth College, graduating from the latter institution in 1854 (at the age of 20). He then entered the Theological Seminary of the Protestant Episcopal Church, and graduated in 1857. Ordained to the Episcopalian ministry, he served first at Pittston, Pennsylvania (1857-8), and then at Scranton, Pennsylvania (1859–62). After a religious conversion, he was received into the Catholic Church in 1863.

He was admitted to the Bar in 1864, and was lecturer and professor in law at Yale University (1869–95). For two years (1869–71) he was judge of the City Court and later (1874-6) judge of the Court of Common Pleas at New Haven, Conn. In 1874 also he served as member of the Legislature.

From Dartmouth College he received (1879) the degree LL.D., and from Yale University the degree M.A. (1881). In 1895 he was appointed professor in the Catholic University of America, where he organized the School of Social Sciences and remained as Dean of the School of Law, Columbus School of Law, until his death (1898–1911).

== Works ==
Besides articles contributed to various periodicals, he wrote:

- "Life of E. B. Kelly" (1855);
- "Notes of Elementary Law" (1876);
- "Elementary Law" (Boston, 1876);
- "Clavis Rerum" (1883);
- "Law of Patents" (3 vols., Boston, 1890);
- "Forensic Oratory" (Boston, 1893);
- "Elements of American Jurisprudence" (Boston, 1900).

== Family ==
He married 2 July 1857, Anna Elizabeth Haviland and, 31 March 1891, Ultima Marie Smith.
