= Kenneth R. Andrews =

American academic

Kenneth Richmond Andrews
- Born: May 24, 1916; Connecticut
- Died: September 4, 2005 (aged 89); Durham, New Hampshire
- Occupation: professor
- Known for: popularized the concept of business strategy

Kenneth Richmond Andrews (May 24, 1916 – September 4, 2005), was an American academic who, along with H. Igor Ansoff and Alfred D. Chandler, was credited with the foundational role in introducing and popularizing the concept of business strategy.

== Education, military service, and employment at Harvard Business School ==
Andrews graduated from Wesleyan University in 1937 with a master's degree in English. He went on to pursue a PhD in English at the University of Illinois at Urbana–Champaign but was drafted into the Army Air Force during World War II. He served at the Statistical Control School, held at the campus of the Harvard Business School and taught by members of the faculty. Andrews retired from the army at the rank of Major and joined the Harvard Business School faculty in 1946, to teach Administrative Practices to MBA students. He completed his Phd dissertation on Mark Twain in 1948. By approximately 1950 he was a significant member of the small team developing HBS's Business Policy course.

== Harvard Business School and Business Strategy ==
In 1965 the highly influential text-book "Business Policy: Text and Cases" was published, acknowledging Andrews as the author of the text portion. The text portion was also published separately under Andrews' name in 1971. Several editions of both books appeared through the 1980s.

In addition to being perhaps the earliest concept of business strategy to be taught routinely in formal courses, the specific view of strategy formation Andrews taught appears to have provided many of the underlying precepts of what strategy is, for several branches of the strategy literature. Although he introduced a number of strategy precepts, Andrews did not set out a detailed concept of what strategy is. Instead he said that he chose to "sidestep the problem of drawing distinctions between objectives, policy and programs of action" Furthermore, Andrews did not claim to originate all of the precepts he set out, and it has been noted that some had been introduced previously by Philip Selznick in 1957 or Alfred D. Chandler in 1962.

Despite sharing a number of Andrews' basic precepts, one major branch of the literature differed strongly from him with regard to how strategy forms. Andrews prescribed that strategy should be deliberately and consciously decided and adopted by management. Henry Mintzberg, however, teaches that in reality strategy often emerges from actions and behaviours at various organizational levels, and furthermore that this is desirable. Thus if both views are recognized there are two major types of process through which strategy may be formed: deliberate, and emergent. There has been vigorous debate concerning the extent to which each of these strategy formation processes is usual or appropriate.

== Master of Leverett House at Harvard University ==
Andrews, together with his wife Caroline, served as Master (today Faculty Dean) of Leverett House from 1971 to 1985. During his tenure, Leverett House became coeducational. During his tenure at Leverett House, Thomas Dingman served as Alston Burr tutor, Yo-Yo Ma, was artist in residence, and Roger W. Ferguson Jr. was a graduate student advisor.

== Bibliography ==
- Andrews, Kenneth Richmond, 1951, Executive training by the case method, Harvard Business Review, vol. 29, no. 5, pp. 58–70.
- Andrews, Kenneth Richmond, 1971, The concept of corporate strategy, Richard D. Irwin, Homewood.
- Andrews, Kenneth Richmond, 1971, New horizons in corporate strategy, McKinsey Quarterly, vol. 7, no. 3, pp. 34–43.
- Andrews, Kenneth Richmond, 1973, Can the best corporations be made moral?, Harvard Business Review, vol. 51, no. 3, pp. 57–64.
- Andrews, Kenneth Richmond, 1980, Directors’ responsibility for corporate strategy, Harvard Business Review, vol. 58, no. 6, pp. 30–42.
- Andrews, Kenneth Richmond, 1981, Corporate strategy as a vital function of the board, Harvard Business Review, vol. 59, no. 6, pp. 174–180.
- Andrews, Kenneth Richmond, 1981, Replaying the board's role in formulating strategy, Harvard Business Review, vol. 59, no. 3, pp. 18–23.
- Andrews, Kenneth Richmond, 1984, Corporate strategy: the essential intangibles, McKinsey Quarterly, no. 4, pp. 43–49.
- Learned, Edmund Philip, Christensen, C. Roland, Andrews, Kenneth Richmond, and Guth, William D., 1965, Business policy: Text and cases, Irwin, Homewood.
