= Abigail Levine =

American dancer and performance artist

Abigail Levine not to be confused with Abigail Lavine, Abigail Levine is a New York-based dance and performance artist.

== Background ==
Levine has created works for opera and theaters--as well as for subway stations, sidewalks, swimming pools, airports, office buildings--in New York City, Washington DC, Havana, São Paulo, Mexico City, Caracas, and Taipei.

Recent commissions and productions include: Benjamin Britten's The Turn of the Screw for Lorin Maazel's Chateauville Foundation (conducted by Maazel at the Kennedy Center); "Slow Falls" presented by the 2011 Movement Research Festival; "Porta Sem Parede"; Any Closer produced by Dixon Place and the Puffin Foundation and performed on sidewalks in Brooklyn, Queens, the Bronx and Manhattan; If You See Something, a dance for subway stations performed in the subway systems of New York City and Caracas, Venezuela; Bernstein's Trouble in Tahiti and Bizet's Le Docteur Miracle for the Manhattan Opera Theater; and Desatar, a commissioned work for 14 dancers from Cuba's national dance company, Danza Contemporanea de Cuba.

Levine has performed recently with Marina Abramović in her retrospective at the New York MoMA, with performance artist Carolee Schneemann, and with choreographers including: Jennifer Monson, koosil-ja hwang, Alan Good, Marianela Boán, Pat Catterson, Larissa Velez, Despina Stamos, Pele Bauch, Wendy Osserman and the Denishawn Repertory Dancers. Her writings on dance have been published by the Movement Research Performance Journal, e-misférica, Cuba Update and CubaNow.

Levine trained at New York's High School of Performing Arts, the Alvin Ailey American Dance Center, Jacob's Pillow Dance Festival, The Place and Middlesex University in London, and with Danza Contemporánea de Cuba in Havana. She graduated from Wesleyan University with a degree in English and is completing a Masters at NYU in Dance and Performance Studies.
