= NEARI School =

Coordinates: 42.205°N 72.595°W

The NEARI School is a therapeutic educational organization operating in Easthampton, Massachusetts. It was founded in 1984 by Steven Bengis and Penny Cuninggim as the New England Adolescent Research Institute to treat extremely challenged youth with learning disabilities, mental illness, and/or neurological disorders. NEARI operates Chapter 766 special education day schools for high school, middle school, and older elementary school students. NEARI no longer operates a training institute or a publishing company.

The publishing company had published works ranging from manuals for specialists in the field of sexual assault to survivor stories. All works are selected for publication based on their ability to educate the public.

== Educational philosophy ==
The NEARI day school practices a "relationship-based" model of learning. This model is a set of policies and principles that guide staff to form lasting relationships with their students. One publicly acknowledged piece of this model is a low student-to-staff ratio. NEARI operates on a ratio of about 3:1 or 2:1, depending on the program in question.

== Brain-based treatment and education ==
Since the year 2000, NEARI has been incorporating "brain-based" technology into its educational and therapeutic services. Coordinated by Penny Cuninggim, this initiative combines specialized exercise with an awareness of learning styles and new practices for diagnosing and treating visual and auditory processing issues.

== Facilities ==
=== Current facilities ===
The NEARI day schools currently operate out of one building in Easthampton MA, the site of the former Tri County School.
