= Thomas McKnight (artist) =

American painter

- Born: Lawrence, Kansas
- Education: Wesleyan University, Columbia University
- Occupation: Artist
- Website: thomasmcknight.com

Thomas McKnight (born 1941) is an American artist. He was born in Kansas.

== Early life and education ==
McKnight was born in Lawrence, Kansas, he attended Wesleyan University, a small liberal arts college in Middletown, Connecticut. In 1964, he spent a year studying art history at Columbia University.

== Career ==
After a year of graduate work in art history at Columbia University, in 1964 McKnight found a job at Time Magazine where he would work for eight years, interrupted by a two-year stint in the U. S. Army in South Korea.

In 1972 McKnight left Time, summered on the Greek island of Mykonos, and commenced painting. In 1988, McKnight’s Constitution was chosen as the official image of the US Constitution Bicentennial.

Throughout the 1980s McKnight's art, mainly limited edition serigraph prints, became increasingly popular.

McKnight was commissioned by the city of Kobe, Japan to create a series of paintings to act as the centerpiece for its tricentennial celebration.

In 1994 he was commissioned by the White House to paint the first of three images for President Bill Clinton’s official Christmas card. One of these, "White House Red Room", was used as the cover of a Lands' End catalog, which sold both the art and the original as one of the Christmas gift items. In 1995 and 1996, McKnight produced he Presidential Christmas card.

McKnight's work is represented in the permanent collection of New York's Metropolitan Museum of Art, as well as in the Smithsonian Institution.

== Personal life ==
In 1979 in Mykonos, McKnight met Renate, a vacationing Austrian student, and married the following year. McKnight and his wife live in Litchfield, Connecticut.
