= Frederick Grover =

American physicist and electrical engineer

Frederick Warren Grover (September 3, 1876 – January 30, 1973) was an American physicist and electrical engineer.

Grover worked as a physicist at the National Bureau of Standards, and he went to study with Arnold Sommerfeld at the Ludwig-Maximilians-Universität München in 1907. He was awarded his doctorate in 1908, and his thesis dealt with precision measurements and theory of eddy currents to determine a new method for finding the conductivity of metals. Upon receipt of his doctorate, he again worked at the National Bureau of Standards. Later, as Professor of Electrical Engineering, he taught at Union College in Schenectady, New York from 1920 to 1946.

Grover received a B.S. degree from MIT in 1899, an M.S. degree from Wesleyan University in 1901, a Ph.D. degree from George Washington University in 1907, and a second Ph.D. degree from the Ludwig-Maximilians-Universität München, Germany in 1908.

== Publications ==
- Frederick W. Grover Additions to Inductance Formulas, Scientific Paper #320, Bulletin of the Bureau of Standards 14 555-570 (1918)
- Frederick W. Grover Tables for the Calculation of the Inductance of Circular Coils of Rectangular Cross Section, Scientific Paper #455, Scientific Papers of the Bureau of Standards 18 451-487 (1922)
- Frederick W. Grover Formulas and Tables for the Calculation of the Inductance of Coils of Polygonal Form, Scientific Paper #468, Scientific Papers of the Bureau of Standards 18 737-762 (1922)
- Frederick W. Grover The Calculation of the Inductance of Single-Layer Coils and Spirals Wound with Wire of Large Cross Section, Proceedings of the Institute of Radio Engineers (1929)
- Frederick W. Grover Inductance Calculations: Working Formulas and Tables (Van Nostrand, 1946 and Dover, 1962 and 2004)
