= William Williams Mather =

American geologist (1804–1859)

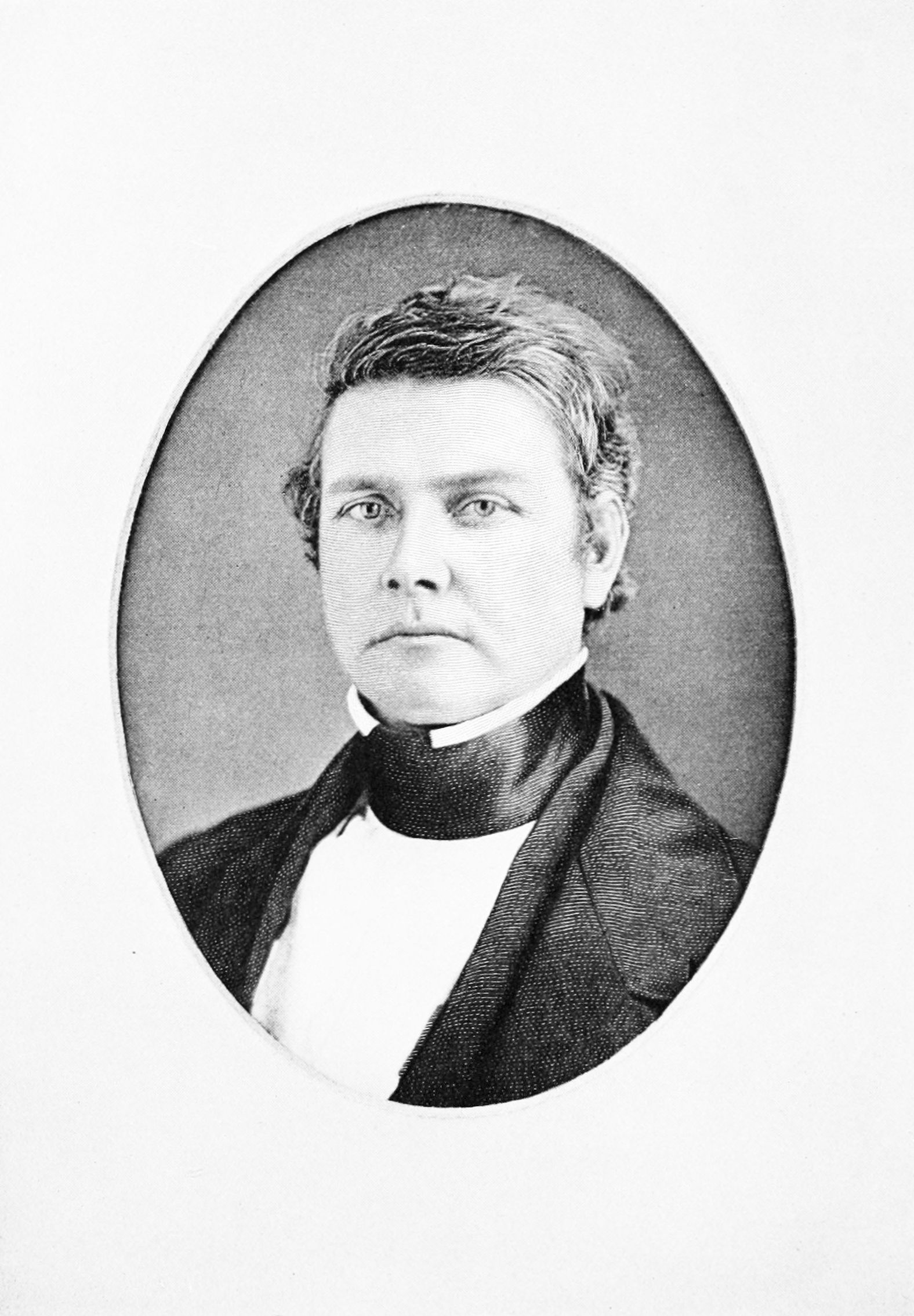
- Born: 24 May 1804; Brooklyn, Connecticut
- Died: 26 February 1859 (aged 54); Columbus, Ohio

William Williams Mather (24 May 1804 – 26 February 1859) was an American geologist.

== Biography ==
He was a lineal descendant of Richard Mather's son Timothy. He was admitted to the U.S. Military Academy in 1823. In 1826 and 1827 he led his class in the newly established department of chemistry and mineralogy, and to him were submitted the proof sheets of Webster's A Manual of Chemistry, then in process of publication. He also invented an apparatus for drawing water from the lowest depths of the Hudson River, and noting its temperature.

After his graduation in 1828, he remained at West Point as acting assistant instructor of artillery during the annual encampment, and was then stationed at the school of practice at Jefferson barracks until April 1829. From June 1829, he was for six years the acting assistant professor of chemistry, mineralogy, and geology at West Point. He was then ordered on topographical duty as assistant geologist to George William Featherstonhaugh, to examine the country from Green Bay to the Coteau des Prairies. This survey was the basis of a report and a topographical map of St. Peter's River valley. He then joined his regiment at Fort Gibson, and marched into the Choctaw country.

While still in the army, and acting as an instructor at West Point, he published several papers on chemistry and geology in the American Journal of Science and Arts. He also prepared a small work on geology for the use of schools (Washington, 1833), and a treatise on "Diluvion," for the use of the cadets. With the consent of the secretary of war he acted, in 1833, as professor of chemistry, geology, and mineralogy in Wesleyan University at Middletown, Connecticut, and in 1834 that institution gave him the degree of A.M. In 1836 he resigned from the army, and thereafter devoted himself exclusively to science.

In 1836 he was appointed geologist of the first district, or 21 counties, of New York State. This work required seven years, and his final report was a quarto of 671 pages, with forty-six colored plates, a great undertaking for the early days of geological research. From 1837 to 1840, he also superintended the geological survey of the state of Ohio, and made elaborate reports (2 vols., Columbus, 1838). In 1838/9 he made a report upon the geological reconnaissance of the state of Kentucky.

In 1842 he became professor of natural science in Ohio University, and in 1845 was its acting president. He was acting professor of chemistry, mineralogy, and geology in Marietta college in 1846, and from 1847 till 1850 vice-president and professor of natural science in Ohio University.

During his professional life, between the years 1846 and 1850, he acted as geologist and mining engineer to various companies on Lake Superior, and a part of his labors is recorded in 33 analyses of ores. Eight reports were also made upon mines in Massachusetts, New Jersey, and Virginia. From 1850 until 1854 he was the agricultural chemist for the state of Ohio, and editor of the Western Agriculturist. In 1853 he was appointed geologist of Lieutenant Williamson's party of exploration across the Sierra Nevada for the Pacific railroad, but declined through physical disability. In 1855 Mather was elected a member of the American Antiquarian Society

From 1837 until his death, he gathered a cabinet of minerals that finally numbered 22,000 specimens. He was a member of many scientific and historical societies, and for fifteen years a trustee of Granville College, Ohio. Brown University gave him the degree of LL.D. in 1853.

He is the brother in-law to James B. Hughes.
