= Sasha Chanoff =

American aid organizer

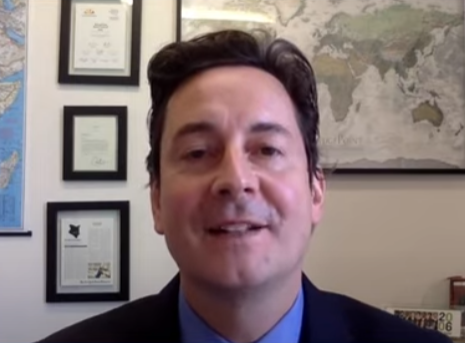
- Speaking at the World Economic Forum's Sustainable Development Summit 2021
- Born: January 13, 1971 (age 55); Helsinki, Finland
- Citizenship: Finland, United States
- Education: Wesleyan University
- Occupation: Refugee relief organizer
- Organization: RefugePoint
- Awards: Charles Bronfman Prize, 2010; Gleitsman Award, 2013

Sasha Chanoff (born 1971) is an American humanitarian based in Somerville, Massachusetts who has worked for two decades in refugee rescue, relief, and resettlement operations in Africa and the United States.

Chanoff is the founder and executive director of RefugePoint, an organization that aids refugees and supports the humanitarian community to do the same. Prior to launching RefugePoint, he consulted with the Office of the United Nations High Commissioner for Refugees in Kenya and worked with the International Organization for Migration throughout Africa, identifying refugees in danger, undertaking rescue missions, and working on refugee protection issues with the US, Canadian, Australian, and other governments.

He often enlists the help of the mass media to spread awareness about refugee issues, and has appeared on 60 Minutes. He has also been a featured teller on the popular public radio storytelling program The Moth Radio Hour.

Sasha Chanoff holds a B.A. from Wesleyan University and an M.A. in Humanitarian Assistance, from the Tufts University Fletcher School of Law and Diplomacy and Friedman School of Nutrition, Science, and Policy. He has received fellowships from Ashoka, the Draper Richards Kaplan Foundation, and Echoing Green, and is a recipient of the Charles Bronfman Humanitarian Prize, the Harvard Center for Public Leadership Gleitsman International Activist Award, the Schwab Foundation / World Economic Forum Social Entrepreneur of the Year Award, and the Obama White House Champion of Change award.

He is a Goodwill Ambassador for the million dollar Aurora Prize for Awakening Humanity. He is a board member of Network of Engaged International Donors (NEID) Global, and served as a human rights adviser to The Leir Charitable Foundations. He also recently served as an adviser to the film The Good Lie, starring Reese Witherspoon, and helped to establish its charitable initiative, The Good Lie Fund, which he advised.

Mr. Chanoff believes resettlement is a vastly superior alternative to refugee camps, since re-settled refugees can support themselves and "get on with their own lives". He views his role as a humanitarian relief organizer to "attempt to help everyone in need."

In 2006, he founded the organization called Mapendo, which was renamed RefugePoint in 2011. RefugePoint provides aid to at-risk and obscure African refugee groups. Mapendo helped to evacuate more than 10,000 refugees from Sudan, Kenya, Burundi, and the Democratic Republic of Congo. He explained:

Oftentimes, ethnic minorities, girls and widows are not safe in the refugee camps. Rape is fairly common, so a lot of women and their families flee the camps out of fear and end up homeless in urban centers with no access to services. Mapendo seeks to find these refugees and help them get the protection and services they need. The organization is named after Rose Mapendo, a Tutsi woman who spent 16 months in a Rwandan death camp with her husband and seven children, and whose experience we wanted to honor. Rose lost her husband in the camps but now lives in Arizona with her children. Mapendo is a Swahili word that means "great love."

— Chanoff, 2004, in interview on PBS

== Early life ==
Chanoff was born in Finland. His great grandparents escaped from pogroms in Russia. Many of his relatives were murdered in the Holocaust half a century later. He explained:

Refugees are on their own, but not by choice. And a lot of people, Jews in particular, have faced this for centuries.

— Chanoff in the Boston Globe

Chanoff is a dual United States and Finnish citizen and speaks English, Finnish, German, French, and Swahili.

== Awards and honors ==
Chanoff was awarded the Charles Bronfman Prize for his humanitarian efforts in 2010. In 2013, he was awarded the Gleitsman International Activist Award, given to an activist who has "improved the quality of life for others." It is an award given to a leader who works to challenge "injustices around the world and inspires others to do the same." Past recipients of this award have included Ralph Nader and Nelson Mandela. In addition, he received fellowships from Ashoka, the Draper Richards Kaplan Foundation, and Echoing Green. In 2006, he was named a Waldzell Institute "Architect of the Future."

== Books ==
- From Crisis to Calling, Barrett-Koehler Publishers, 2016
