= William D. Mundell =

American poet (1912–1997)

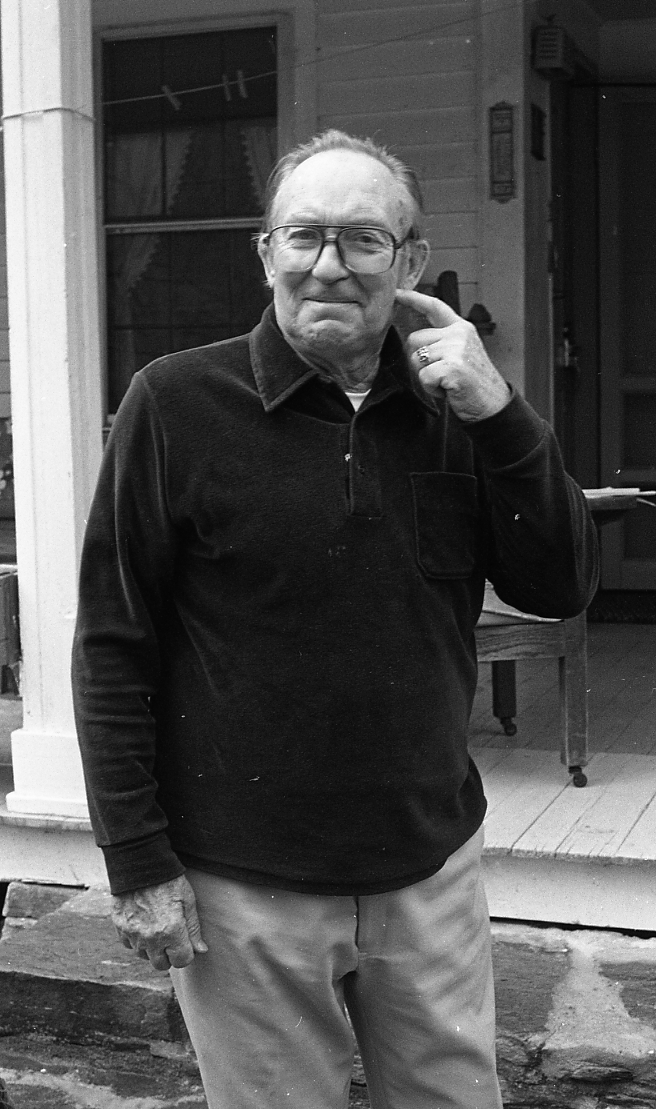
- The Brattleboro Reformer, Monday, December 14, 1987 photo
- Born: December 31, 1912; South Newfane, Windham County, Vermont
- Died: December 24, 1997 (aged 84); South Newfane, Windham County, Vermont
- Education: Marlboro College, Marlboro, Vermont and Middlebury College, Middlebury, Vermont
- Known for: Poet Laureate of Vermont 1989-1997
- Honours: Stephen Vincent Benét Award, 1968

William Daniel Mundell (December 30, 1912 – December 24, 1997) was an American poet who served as Vermont's poet laureate from 1989 to 1997. He published six anthologies of poetry.

== Biography ==
Mundell was born on December 31, 1912, and he died on Christmas Eve 1997, in a 200-year-old farmhouse in South Newfane, Vermont, in the same room in which he was born. He attended Middlebury College but dropped out during the Great Depression to support his family. During World War II, he served as a radar operator in the Pacific War. After the War, he took a year at Marlboro College.

Mundell was a foreman with the Vermont State Highway Department, a selectman, justice of the peace, and auditor for the Town of Newfane. He was a carpenter, stonemason, painter, and a fine photographer, noted for his studies of frost on windows and ice in brooks – which appeared in Life Magazine, March 5, 1971. An expert skier, he built one of the first rope ski tows in Vermont and opened the Woodford Ski Area on Prospect Mountain.

Mundell was Executive Editor of Poet Lore magazine, and taught poetry at the Cooper Hill Writers Conference. In 1989, he was named his state's poet laureate by the Poetry Society of Vermont. He was the second person to hold this title, after Robert Frost.

On February 18, 1998, the Vermont House and Senate passed Joint Resolution 123, "celebrating the remarkable life of Vermont's Poet Laureate and artist extraordinary William D. Mundell".

As part of New York Public Radio, Readers Almanac series, Mundell discussed his 1977 collection Mundell Country: New Poems on June 26, 1978. The 23 minute audio file may be streamed at the NYPR Archive Collection.

== Awards ==
- Stephen Vincent Benét Award, 1968
- Vermont Poet Laureate, 1989–1997.

== Works ==
Mundell's photographs and poetry appeared in The New Yorker, The Atlantic, American Forests, Poet Lore, Life, and Ladies' Home Journal. He published six volumes of poetry:

- Hill Journey (Stephen Greene Press, 1970)
- Plowman’s Earth (Stephen Greene Press, 1973)
- Mundell Country (Stephen Greene Press, 1977)
- Finding Home (Cooper Hill Books, 1984)
- A Book of Common Hours (Greenhills Books, 1989)
- The Fun of Hollerin’ (Cooper Hill Books, 1998)
