= Howe family (United States politicians) =

The Howe family is a family of politicians from the United States. Below is a list of members.

- Jonah Howe (1749-1826), Massachusetts State Representative. First cousin of Gardner Howe and Nathan Howe.
- Gardner Howe (1759-1854), Vermont State Representative 1816 1823. First cousin of Jonah Howe and Nathan Howe.
- Nathan Howe (1762-1851), Massachusetts State Representative. First cousin of Jonah Howe and Gardner Howe.
  - William Howe (1774-1828), Probate Court Judge in Vermont, Vermont State Representative. Third cousin once removed of Jonah Howe.
  - Thomas Marshall Howe (1808-1877), U.S. Representative from Pennsylvania 1851-1855, delegate to the Republican National Convention 1860. Third cousin once removed of Jonah Howe.
  - Jonas Elijah Howe (1814-1892), Massachusetts State Representative. Third cousin once removed of Jonah Howe.
  - Joseph Hall (1793-1859), U.S. Representative from Maine 1833-1837, candidate for Mayor of Boston, Massachusetts 1849. Son-in-law of Nathan Howe.
    - Jonas Howe (1786-1865), Massachusetts State Representative 1845. Fourth cousin once removed of Thomas Marshall Howe.
    - Marshall Otis Howe, Justice of the Peace in Vermont, Vermont State Representative 1882. Grandson of Gardner Howe.
    - Charles A. Eldredge (1820-1896), Wisconsin State Senator 1854-1856, U.S. Representative from Wisconsin 1863-1875. First cousin twice removed of Jonah Howe, Gardner Howe, and Nathan Howe.
    - Laban Marcy (1780-1860), Massachusetts State Representative, delegate to the Massachusetts Constitutional Convention 1820 1853. Third cousin by marriage of William Howe, Thomas Marshall Howe, and Jonas Elijah Howe.
    - Robert Gates (1780-1865), Connecticut State Representative 1832. Son-in-law of William Howe.
    - James H. Brown (1818-1900), Judge of West Virginia Court of Appeals 1863-1870. Son-in-law of Thomas Marshall Howe.
    - James W. Brown (1844-1909), U.S. Representative from Pennsylvania 1903-1905. Son-in-law of Thomas Marshall Howe.
    - George W. Guthrie (1848-1917), candidate for Mayor of Pittsburgh, Pennsylvania 1896; candidate for Lieutenant Governor of Pennsylvania 1902; delegate to the Democratic National Convention 1904 1912; Mayor of Pittsburgh, Pennsylvania 1906-1909; U.S. Ambassador to Japan 1913-1917. Son-in-law of Thomas Marshall Howe.
      - Frank E. Howe, Vermont State Representative 1908 1910, Lieutenant Governor of Vermont 1912-1915. Great-grandson of Gardner Howe.
      - Arthur O. Howe, Vermont State Representative 1931-1933 1937 1945, Vermont State Senator 1947. Great-grandson of Gardner Howe.
      - Jonas H. Howe (1821-1898), Minnesota State Representative 1866. Son of Jonas Howe.
      - Nathaniel B. Baker (1818-1876), Governor of New Hampshire 1854-1855. Second cousin thrice removed of Jonah Howe and Gardner Howe.
      - Joseph P. Howe, Minnesota State Representative 1861. Third cousin twice removed of William Howe and Thomas Marshall Howe.
      - George B. McClellan (1826-1885), candidate for President of the United States 1864, Governor of New Jersey 1878-1881. Grandson-in-law of Laban Marcy.
        - James Henry Howe (1827-1893), Attorney General of Wisconsin 1860-1862, U.S. District Court Judge in Wisconsin 1873. Third cousin thrice removed of Jonah Howe and Gardner Howe.
        - Hamilton T. Howe, New Hampshire State Senator 1907-1908. Third cousin twice removed of Jonas Howe.
        - George B. McClellan, Jr. (1865-1940), delegate to the Democratic National Convention 1892 1896 1900, U.S. Representative from New York 1895-1903, Mayor of New York City 1904-1909. Son of George B. McClellan.

NOTE: Thomas Marshall Howe's fourth cousin, Persis, was also wife of Massachusetts State Representative Amos Sawyer. Jonas Howe's third cousin, Lovisa, was also wife of New Hampshire State Representative Jacob Rice. George W. Guthrie was also son of Pittsburgh, Pennsylvania Mayor John B. Guthrie.

== See also ==
- List of United States political families
