= Williamsville Covered Bridge =

- U.S. National Register of Historic Places
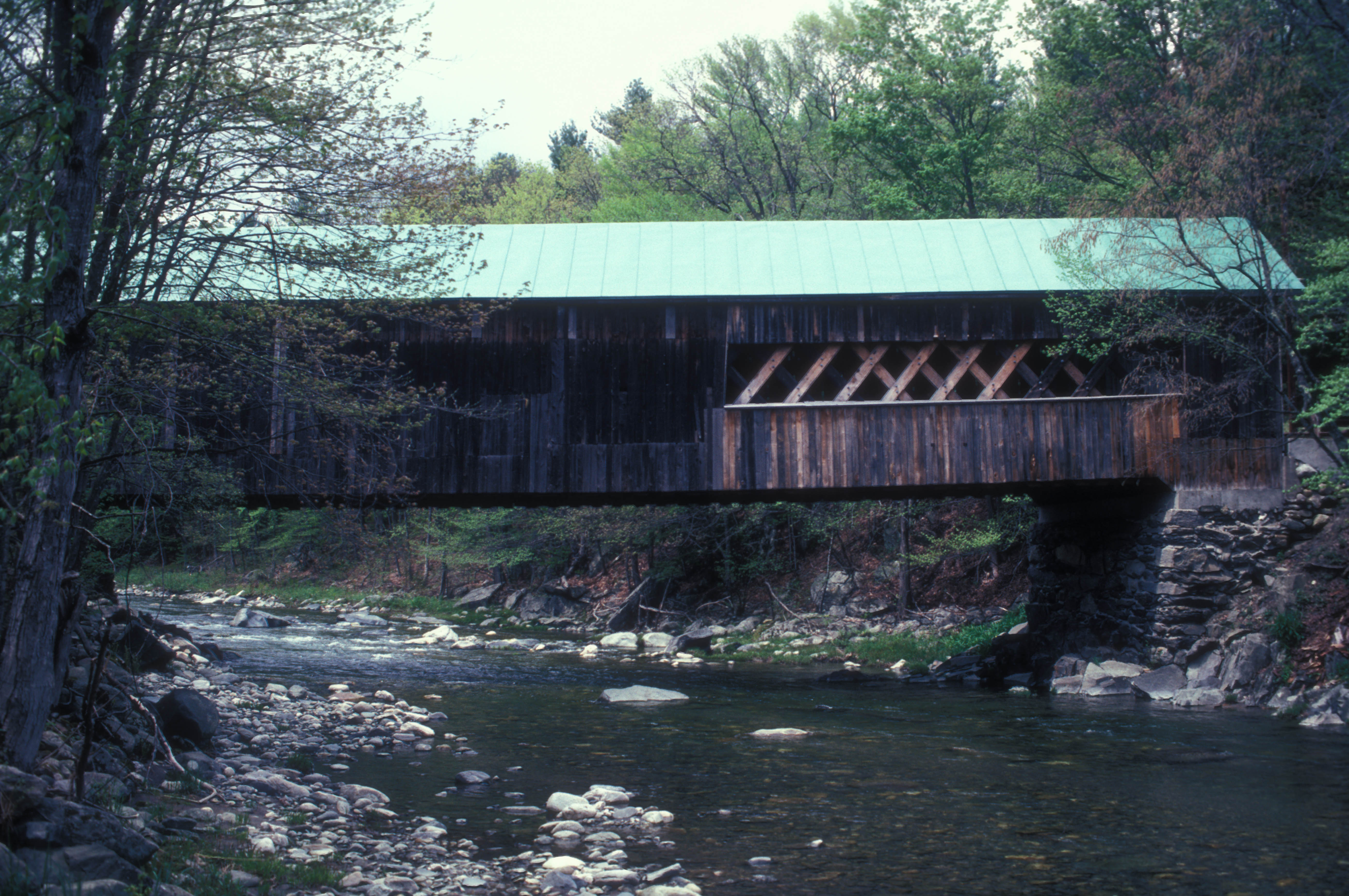

- Location within Vermont Location within the United States
- Location: Dover Rd. over the Rock River, Newfane, Vermont
- Coordinates: 42°56′34″N 72°41′17″W
- Area: 1 acre (0.40 ha)
- Built: 1870
- Architectural style: Town lattice truss
- NRHP reference No.: 73000208
- Added to NRHP: August 14, 1973

The Williamsville Covered Bridge is a historic covered bridge, carrying Dover Road over the Rock River in Newfane, Vermont. Probably built in the 1870s, this Town lattice truss bridge is probably the oldest covered bridge in Windham County, and is the only one surviving in the town of Newfane. It was listed on the National Register of Historic Places in 1973.

== Description and history ==
The Williamsville Covered Bridge is located in south-central Newfane, about 0.4 miles (0.64 km) west of the village of Williamsville. It carries Dover Road, the main road leading west from the village, across the Rock River, whose valley the road follows in this area. The bridge has a length of 118 feet (36 m) and a width of 21 feet (6.4 m), allowing for a single travel lane. It has a portal clearance of 11 feet (3.4 m), and its roof is metal. It is supported by two Town lattice trusses, and its exterior is clad in vertical board siding. Its original wooden roadway supports have been replaced by steel beams, and the roadbed is paved.

The bridge was built in the 1870s by an unknown builder, and is the last surviving historic covered bridge in the town.

== See also ==
- National Register of Historic Places listings in Windham County, Vermont
- List of bridges on the National Register of Historic Places in Vermont
- List of Vermont covered bridges
