= William Hastings Williams =

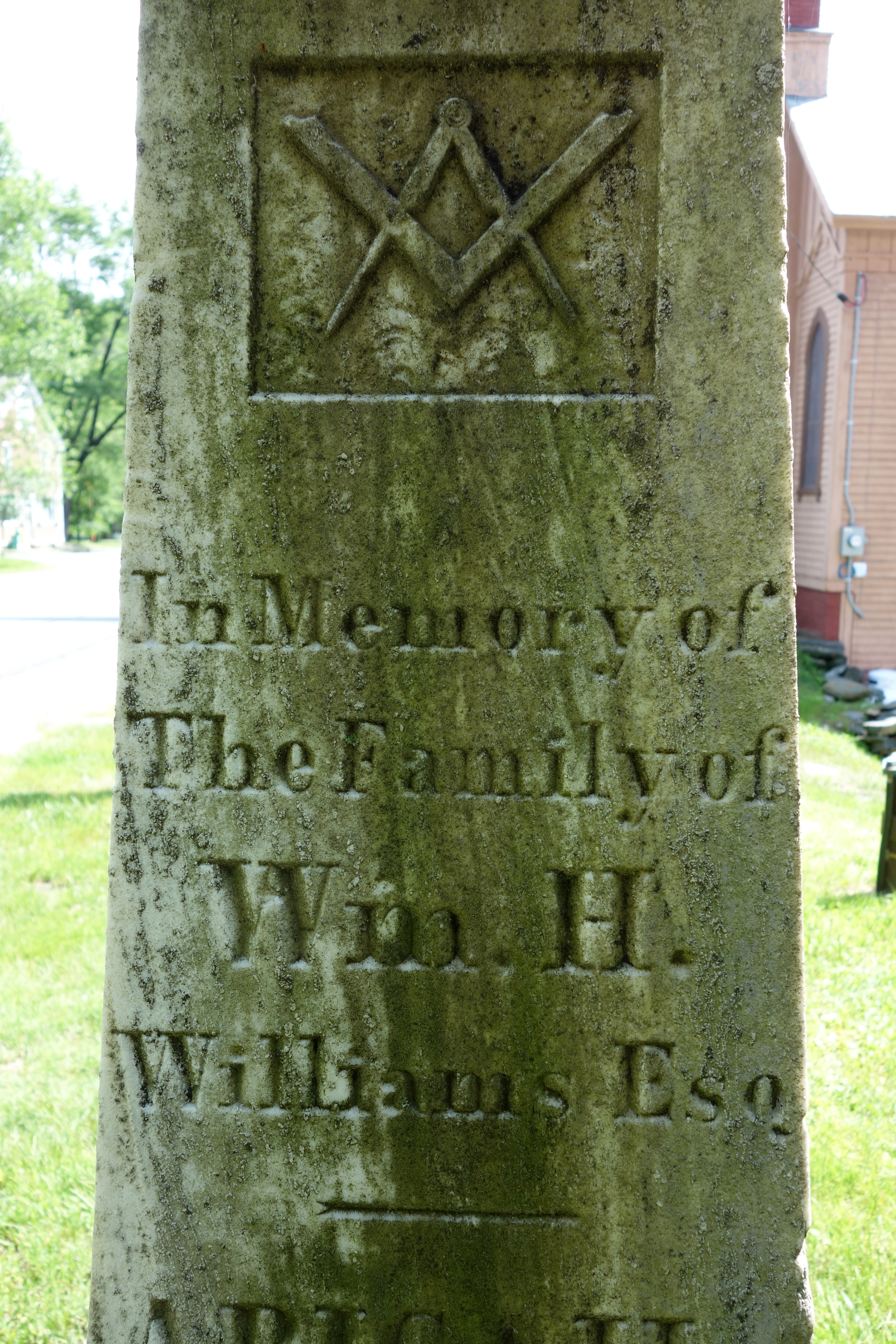
- Born: February 24, 1776; Chester, Massachusetts
- Died: December 9, 1866 (aged 90); Williamsville, Vermont
- Resting place: Williamsville Old Cemetery
- Other name: Captain Bill
- Occupation: Merchant
- Known for: Founder of Williamsville, Vermont
- Spouse(s): Abigail Robinson m.1802-1821 Rosanna Miller m.1826-1866

William Hastings "Captain Bill" Williams (1776–1866) was born in Chester, Massachusetts, from a military family whose lineage in Marlborough dates back to the mid 17th century.

Throughout his life he was a miller – operating grist and sawmills – merchant, manufacturer, and member of the Masonic lodge.

He eventually settled and lived out his life outside of Newfane, Vermont, in Williamsville, which bears his namesake.

== Biography ==
=== Early life ===
Williams was the eighth child of Larkin Williams and Anne Warren - Larkin died in 1781, when young William was only five years old. As a young man, he went on to learn and work in cloth dressing, in Chester and beyond.

=== Time in Vermont ===
Williams moved from Massachusetts to Newfane in October, 1797. Soon after, he began working at the oil and textile works of Darius and Thomas Wheeler. In 1801, he purchased the operations from the Wheelers and began to expand, milling corn and wheat.

He met his first wife, Abigail Robinson, in Newfane. The two would be married in 1802 and remained so until her death in 1821.

=== War of 1812 ===
During this time, Williams saw his wealth grow considerably as he was engaged to produce potash and woolen cloth to support the War efforts. Consequently, he began to expand operations in now Williamsville, erecting a sawmill, flour mill, carding machine, and general store.

== Legacy ==
The building which housed the general store still stands, now renovated and repurposed as a restaurant. Remains of the grist mill and mill pond along the Rock River can still be seen, though each suffered extensive damage following hurricanes in 1938 and Hurricane Irene, respectively.

Williams' former home remains and is located near the intersection of Dover and Depot Road.
