= Williamsville, Vermont =

Coordinates: 42°56′48″N 72°40′44″W

- Unincorporated Community
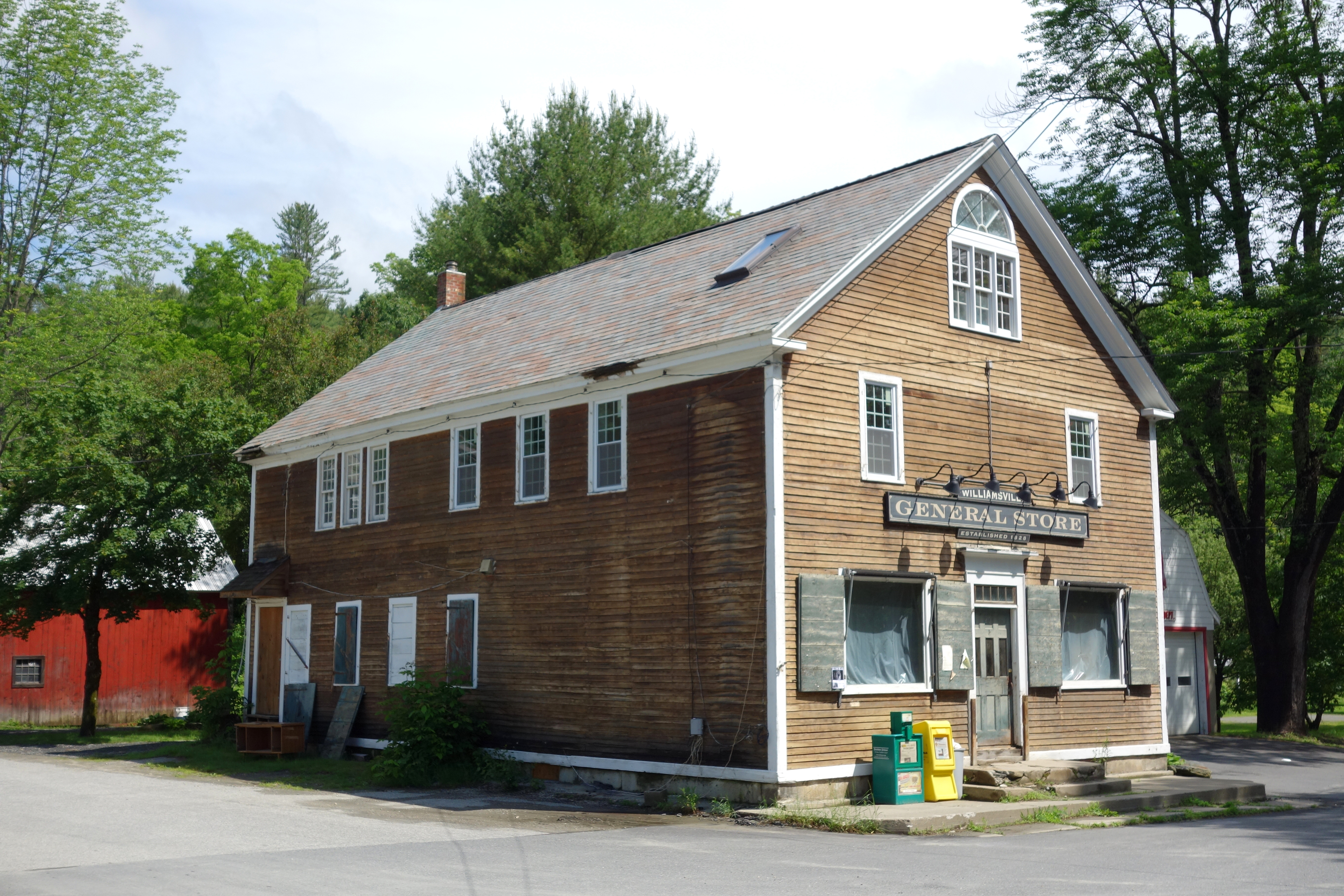
- Williamsville General Store

- Location within Vermont
- Country: United States
- State: Vermont
- County: Windham
- Named after: William Hastings Williams
- ZIP Code: 05362
- Area code: 802

Williamsville is an unincorporated community in the town of Newfane in Windham County, Vermont, United States. The community is situated largely along the Rock River in the West River Valley and borders Newfane Town Forest.

== Governance ==
Williamsville and South Newfane once shared a Volunteer Fire Department and Postal Office. The fire department has since closed and the former fire station is now NewBrook Station 2.

The ZIP Code for Williamsville is 05362.

== Landmarks ==
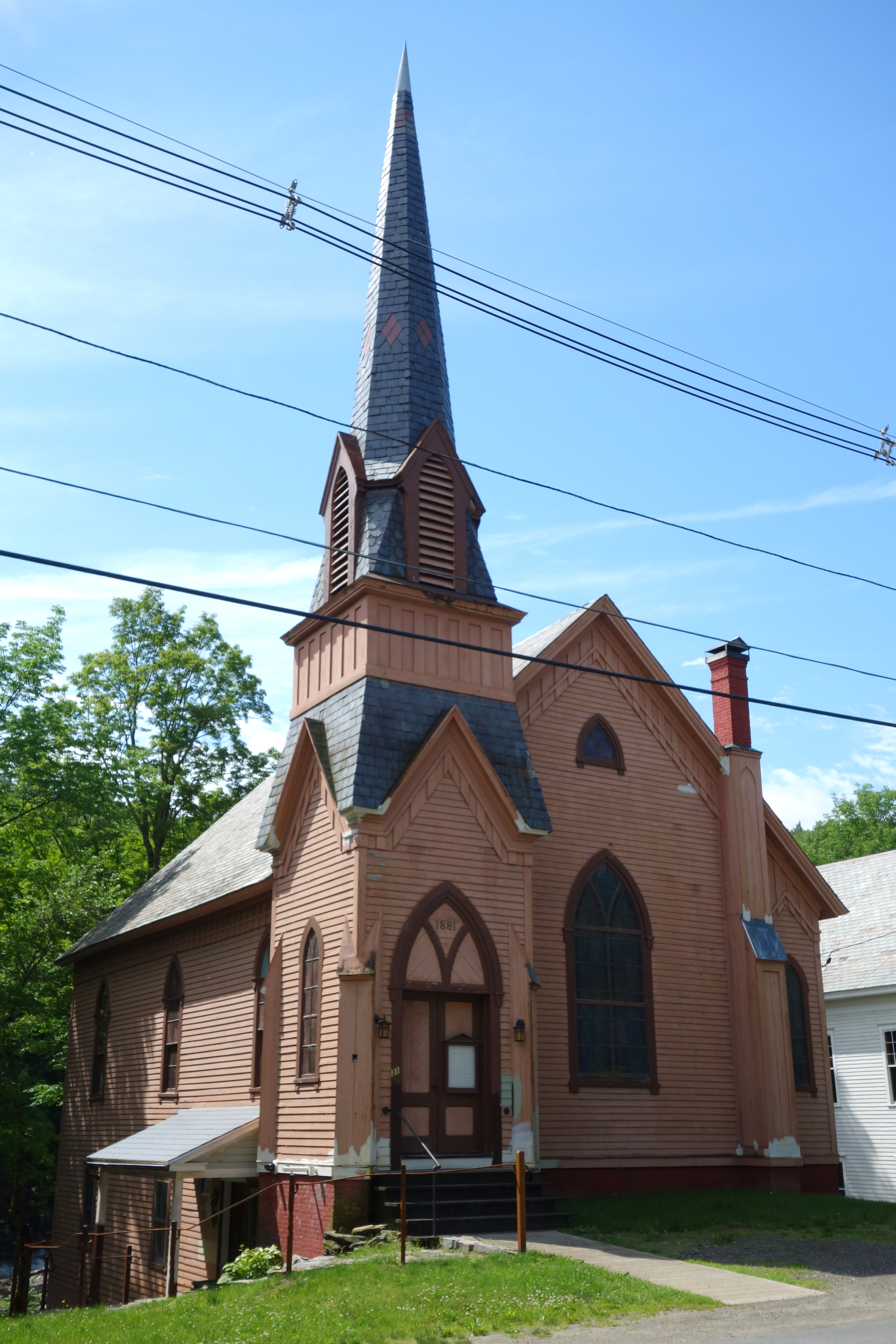
Former church

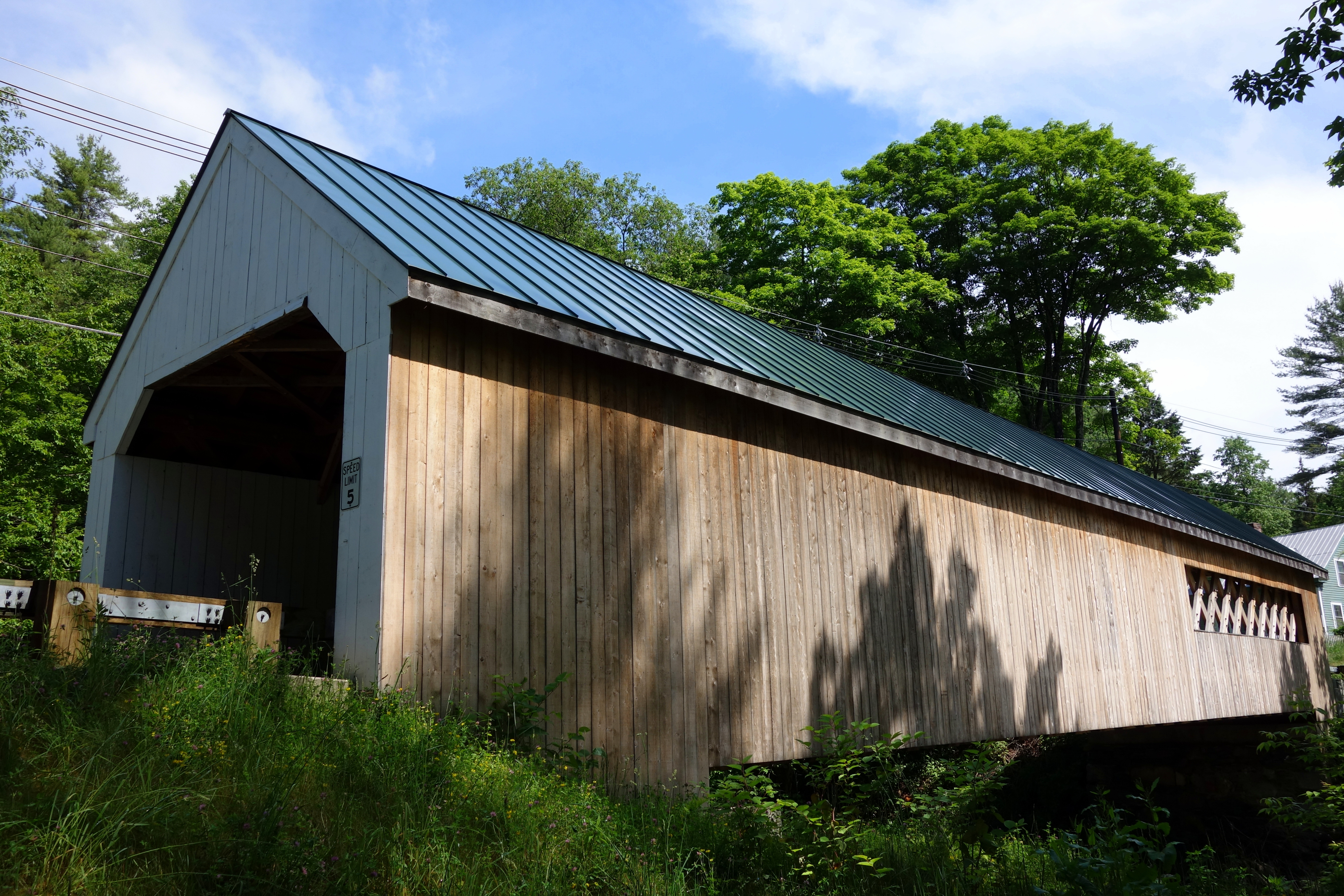
Williamsville covered bridge

- Home of William Hastings Williams
- Former general store - present location of the Williamsville Eatery
- Former school house
- Mill pond and former grist mill
- Former church
- Covered bridge

== Gallery ==
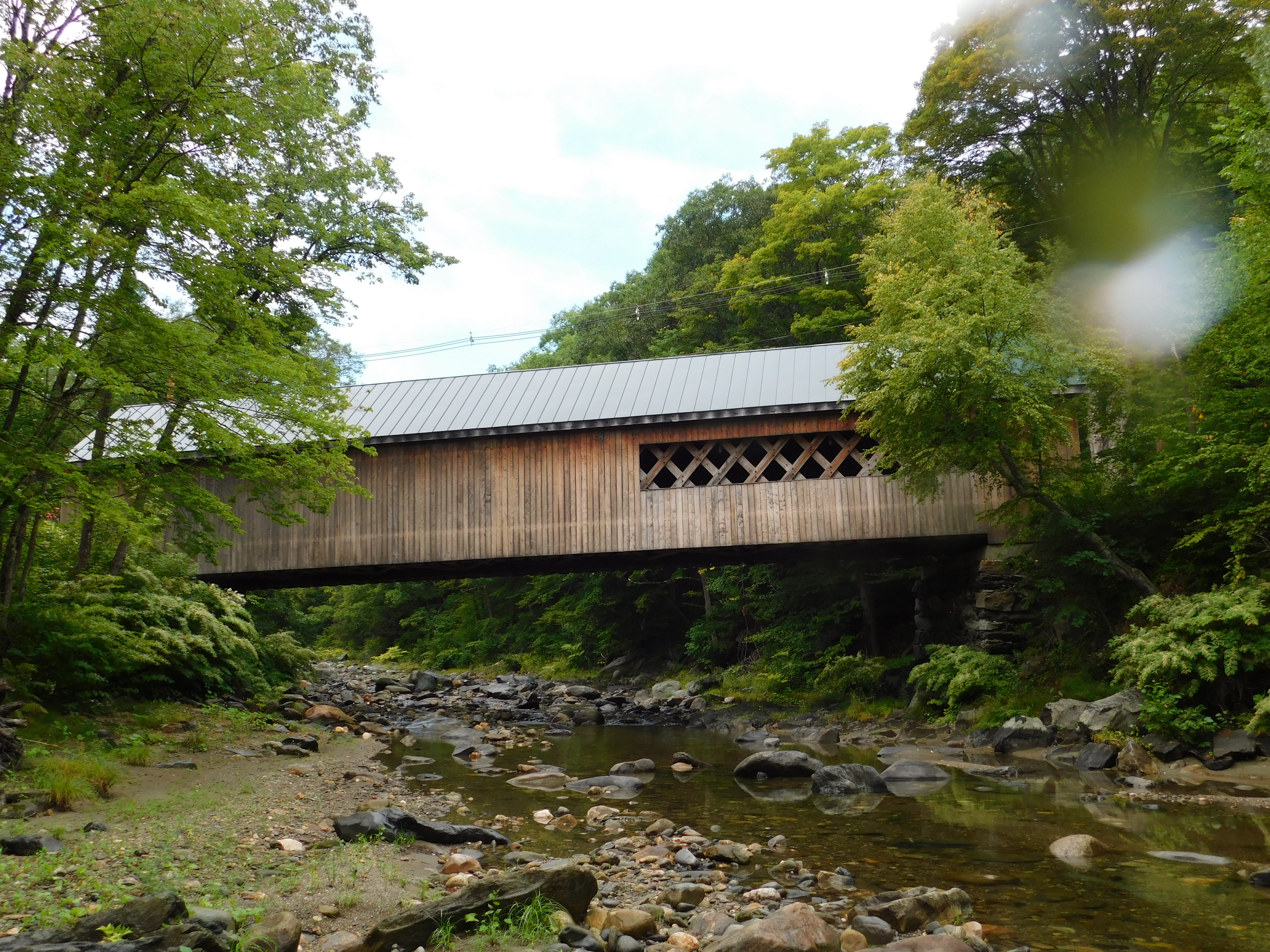
Williamsville covered bridge

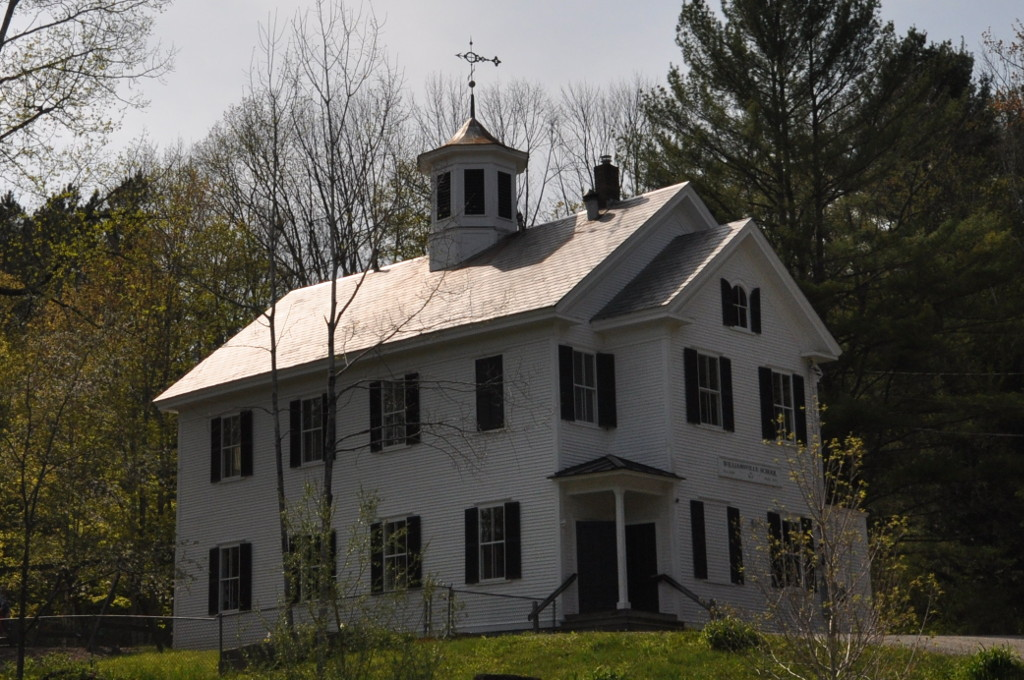
Former schoolhouse

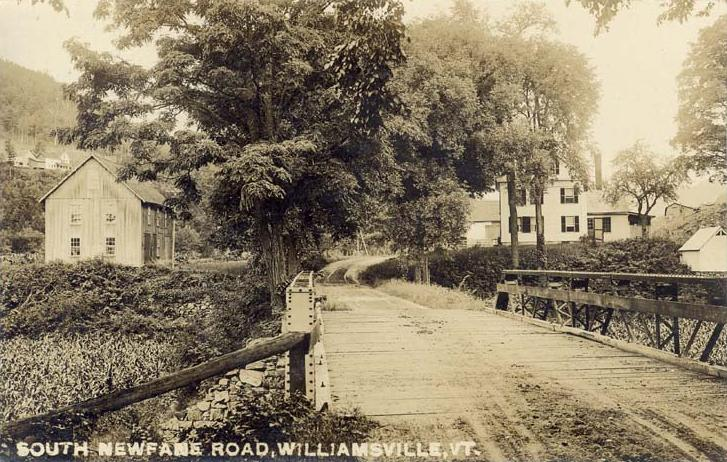
Historical photo of South Newfane Rd
