= Historical Society of Windham County =

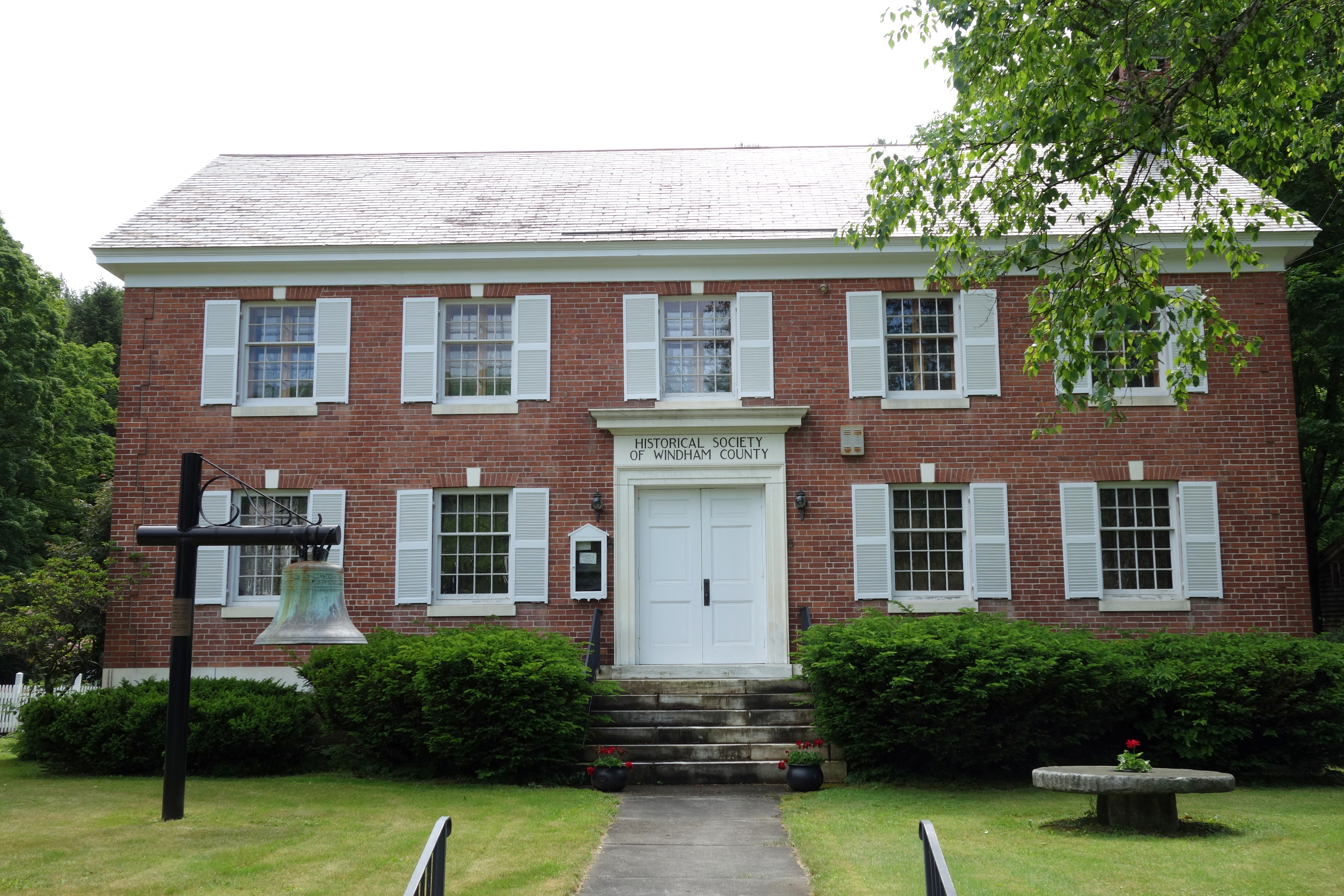
- Established: 1928
- Location: Main Street; Newfane, Vermont, United States
- Coordinates: 42.9844°N 72.6555°W
- Type: Historical society and museum
- Website: www.historicalsocietyofwindhamcounty.org

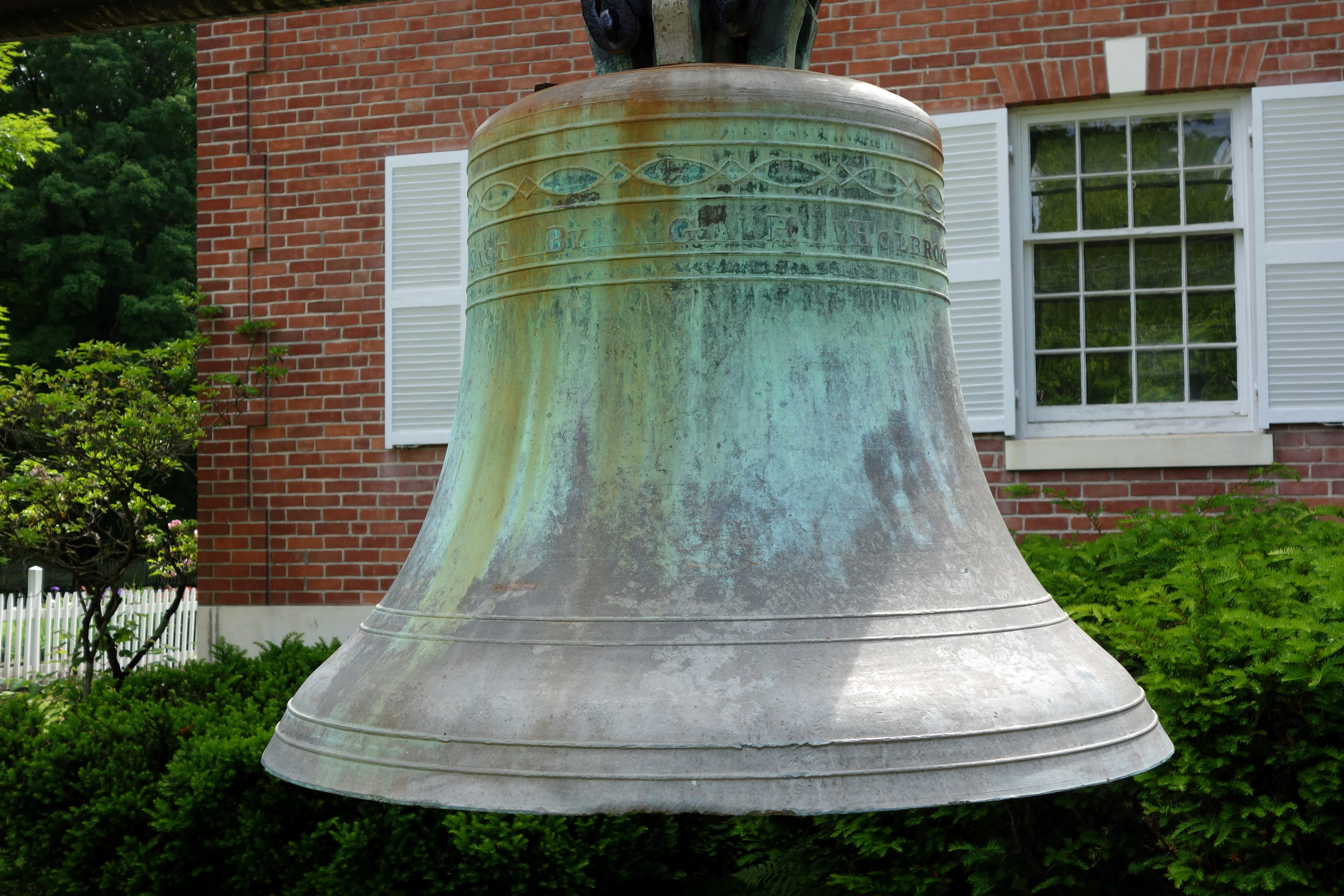
A bell cast in 1841, that stands in front of the Windham County Museum building

The Historical Society of Windham County, and its constituent Windham County Museum, is a local historical society formed in 1927 to record and study the history of Windham County, Vermont. The organization was founded by Clara Chipman Newton, and subsequently incorporated in 1933. Subsequently, the organization built its current museum, starting in 1936 in Newfane, VT, and the museum is listed on the National Register of Historic Places. The society also holds a biannual "Windham County History Fair" in Newfaine.

In 2015, the society purchased the remaining Newfane station, one of the last buildings left over from the West River Railroad, to preserve the history of the railroad and to create a "West River Railroad Museum.

== See also ==
- List of historical societies in Vermont
