= Marshall Howe =

Marshall Howe may refer to:

- Marshall Avery Howe (1867–1936), American botanist
- Marshall Otis Howe (1832–1919), American politician from Vermont
