= Arthur O. Howe =

American politician

Arthur Otis Howe

Member of the Vermont House of Representatives from the Newfane, Windham district
- In office 1931 – 1933, 1937, 1945

Member of the Vermont Senate from the Windham County district
- In office 1947–1948

Personal details
- Born: March 7, 1871 Newfane, Vermont
- Died: November 27, 1951 (aged 80) Newfane, Vermont
- Party: Republican
- Spouse: never married
- Profession: dairy farmer, electrical engineer

Arthur Otis Howe (March 7, 1871 – November 27, 1951) was a dairy farmer and electrical engineer from Newfane, Vermont and a Republican member of the Vermont House of Representatives, serving from 1931 to 1933 and then reelected in 1937 and 1945. He also served in the Vermont Senate from 1947 to 1948.

== Personal background and family relations ==
Arthur Otis Howe was born in Newfane, Vermont to Marshall Otis Howe (1832–1919) and Gertrude Isabel (Dexter) Howe (1845–1930). He was never married. He was a dairy farmer in Newfane, Vermont and as a trained electrical engineer, he served in his early adult years as the superintendent of the electric light works in Chelsea, Vermont. In 1931 he was elected to his first term in the Vermont House of Representatives, serving until 1933. He was reelected in 1937 and 1945. He was elected to the Vermont Senate, and served from 1947 to 1948. Howe died at his home in Newfane. Howe was a direct descendant of John Howe (1602-1680) who arrived in Massachusetts Bay Colony in 1630 from Brinklow, Warwickshire, England and settled in Sudbury, Massachusetts. Arthur Otis Howe was also a descendant of Edmund Rice, an early immigrant to Massachusetts Bay Colony, as follows:

- Arthur Otis Howe, son of
- Marshall Otis Howe (1832-1919), son of
  - Otis Howe (1793-1872), son of
  - Gardner Howe (1759-1854), son of
  - Priscilla Rice (1731-?), daughter of

  - Luke Rice (1689-1754), son of
  - Daniel Rice (1655-1737), son of
  - Edward Rice (1622-1712), son of

      - Edmund Rice, (ca1594-1663)
