= Prospect Mountain (Vermont) =

Mountain in Vermont, United States

Coordinates: 42°52′28″N 73°04′01″W

Highest point
- Elevation: 2,740 ft (840 m)
- Prominence: 590 ft (180 m)

Geography
- Location: Woodford, Vermont, U.S.
- Parent range: Green Mountains

Climbing
- Easiest route: Hike

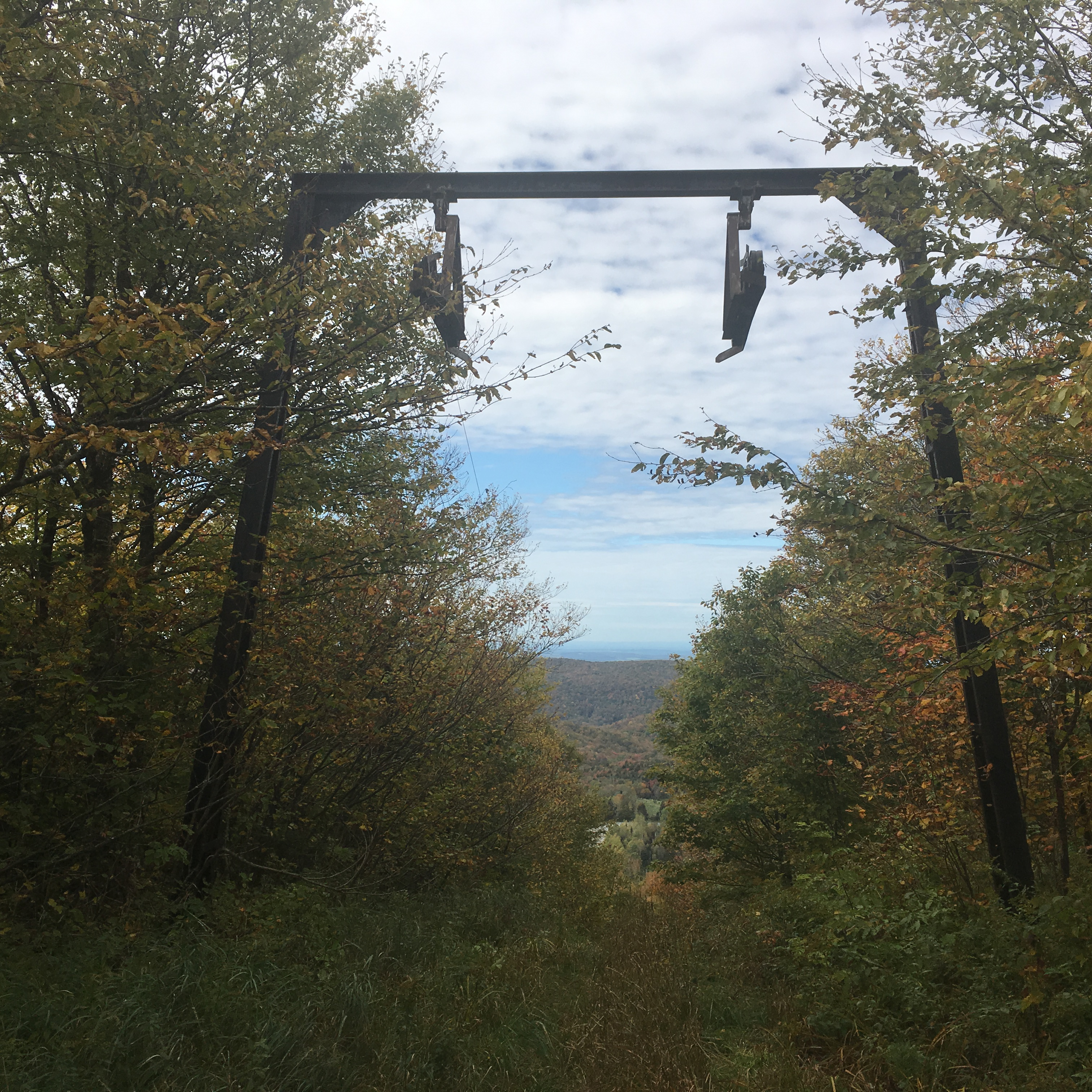
Looking North from the summit of Prospect Mountain 2019

Prospect mountain is a mountain located in the town of Woodford, Vermont in Bennington County, Vermont. The mountain is located in the southern region of Vermont's Green Mountains. It is home to the Prospect Mountain Nordic Ski Area, which has the highest base elevation of any ski area in New England, accounting for its abundance of natural snow. Prospect Mountain can be counted on to provide a long season for cross-country skiing.

Since the mid-1930s, when Alex Drysdale opened the first rope tow on Prospect Mountain in Woodford, the mountain has been used for recreation. Around 1938, William D. Mundell, future Vermont poet laureate, purchased land and opened the Woodford Ski Area in the lower part of what would eventually become the current-day Prospect Mountain Nordic Ski Area. He operated the ski area for several years before shuttering it to serve in the Marine Corps during World War II, returning to continue to operate it until likely the mid-1950s. William Morse, with a contract to rebuild Route 9 from Bennington, likely reopened Prospect in 1961–62 with a new 3,200 foot long T-Bar. With the new lift and vertical drop expanded to some 675 feet, Prospect Mountain became a mid-sized ski area. Morse sold the ski area to Bennington attorney Joseph Parks in October 1978. Night skiing and cross country skiing (the former Timberlane Trails touring center) operations were added for 1979–1980. Prospect Mountain has over 35 kilometers of expertly groomed ski trails, and offers excellent skiing to everyone from racers to families. Snowshoe and backcountry ski trails are available.

Joe Parks lobbied for the creation of a wilderness designation to preserve and protect the beaver meadows beyond the peak. The George D. Aiken Wilderness was named after the late Vermont senator George D. Aiken, a strong advocate of preservation and a leader in securing the Eastern Wilderness Areas Act of 1975.

Steve Whitham and Andrea Amodeo purchased the ski area from Joe Parks in 1991. After deciding to sell it, they worked with the Prospect Mountain Association (PMA) to transition ownership. PMA is primarily a volunteer organization that relies the energy and efforts of season pass holders and supporters. Steve Whitham is staying on as the Mountain Manager and is now an employee of PMA. PMA purchased the 144-acre property in the fall of 2018 and shortly thereafter conserved it with Vermont Land Trust.

David Newell, president of the PMA, said the balance of the cost will come from a $450,000 donation from alumni of Williams College and a $285,000 grant from the Vermont Housing and Conservation Board, which is contingent upon approval for a preservation easement for the mountain portion of the land and completion of the PMA's capital campaign. Williams College Nordic ski teams have used Prospect Mountain for training and race events, as have Mount Anthony Union High School and Mount Greylock Regional High School in Williamstown, Mass. Prospect Mountain will now serve as the home base for the Williams Nordic team and host the college's winter carnival, Newell said, adding that the PMA has a nine-member board of directors, including four associated with the college.

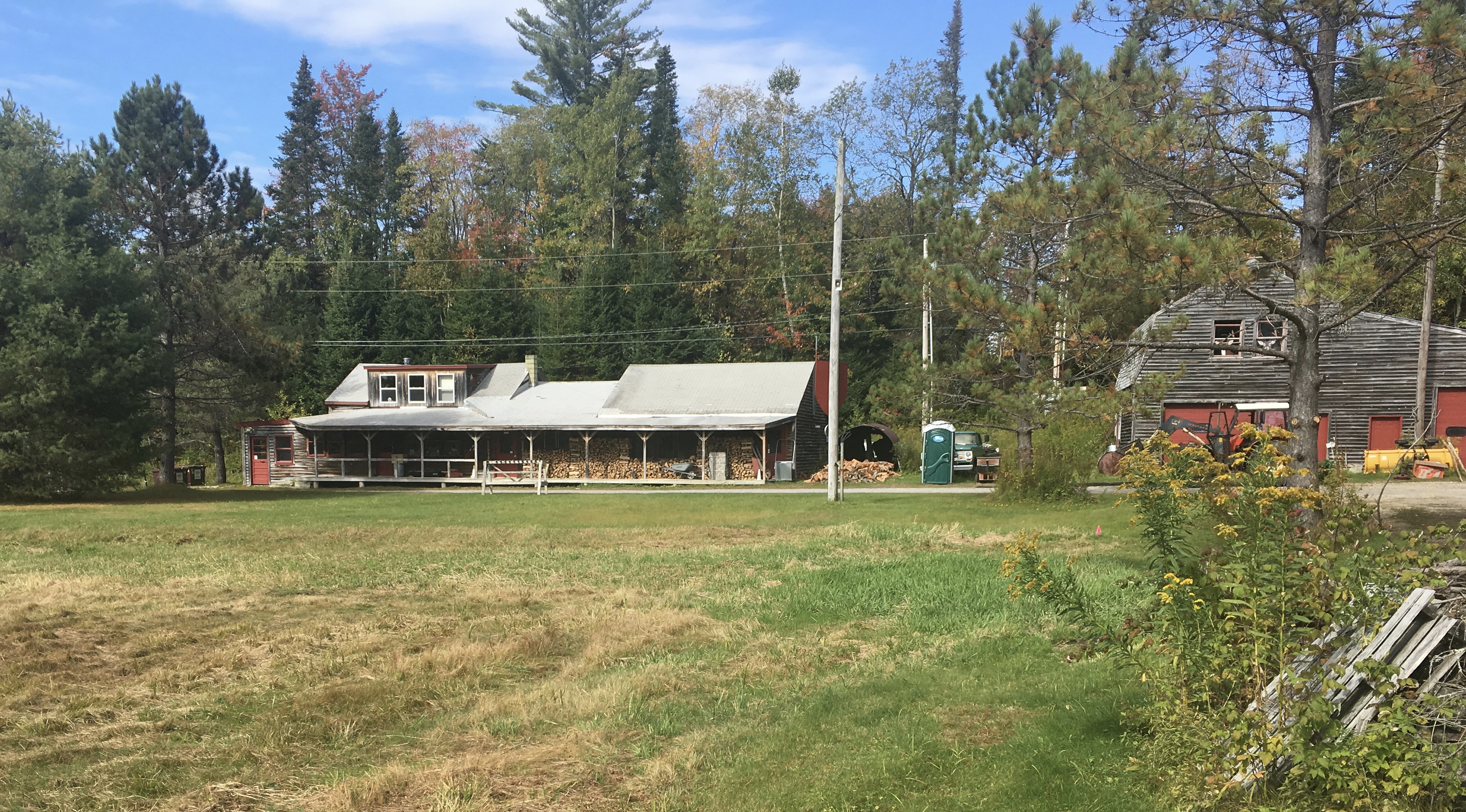
Office at the base of Prospect Mountain, Vermont
