= West Halifax, Vermont =

- Village
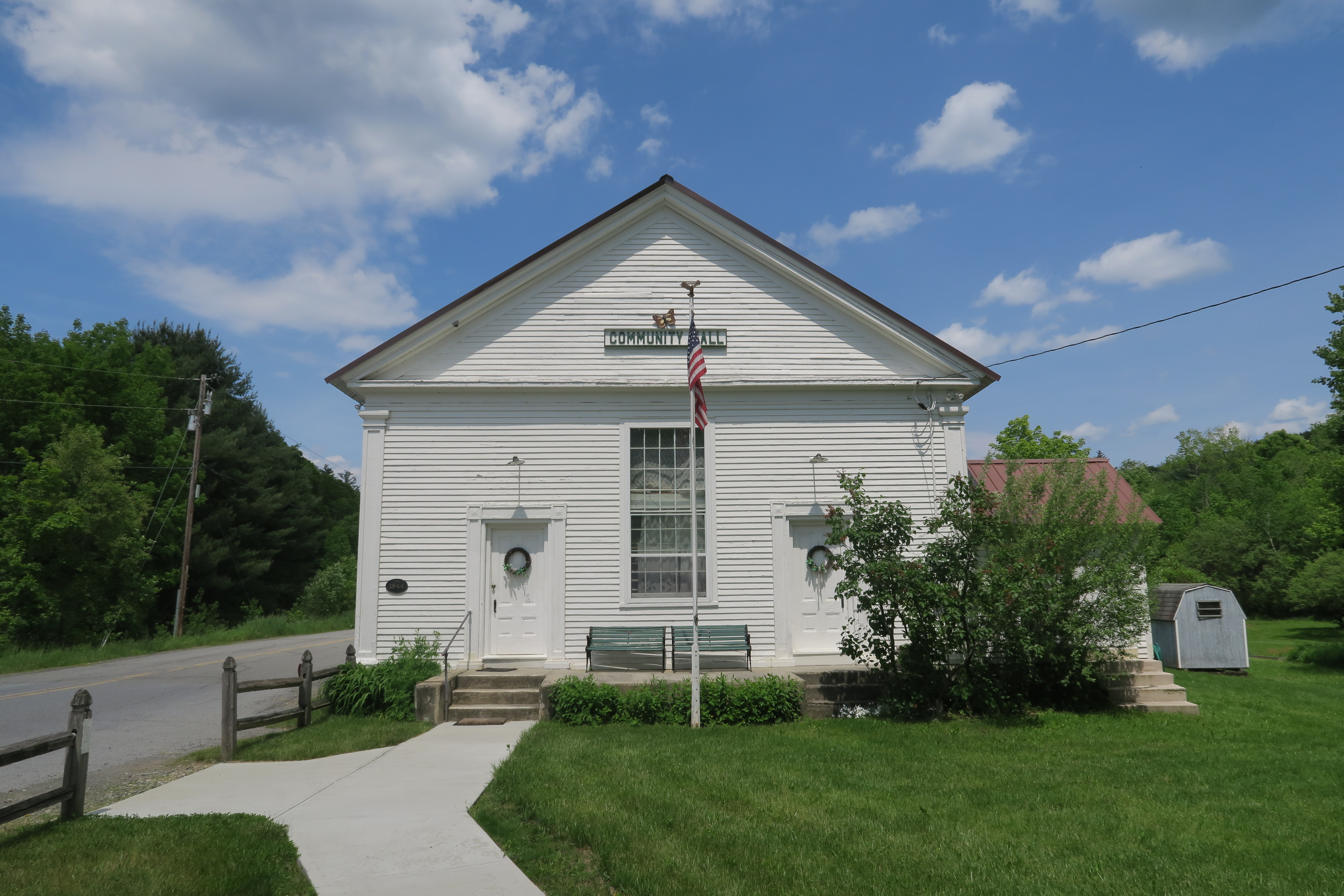
- Community Center

- Location within Vermont
- Coordinates: 42°47′14″N 72°46′14″W
- Country: United States
- State: Vermont
- County: Windham
- Elevation: 1,152 ft (351 m)
- Time zone: UTC-5 (Eastern (EST))
  - Summer (DST): UTC-4 (EDT)
- ZIP code: 05358
- Area code: 802
- GNIS feature ID: 1460143

West Halifax is an unincorporated village in the town of Halifax, Windham County, Vermont, United States. The community is 2.7 miles (4.3 km) east-southeast of Jacksonville. West Halifax has a post office with ZIP code 05358.
