= South Newfane, Vermont =

- Village
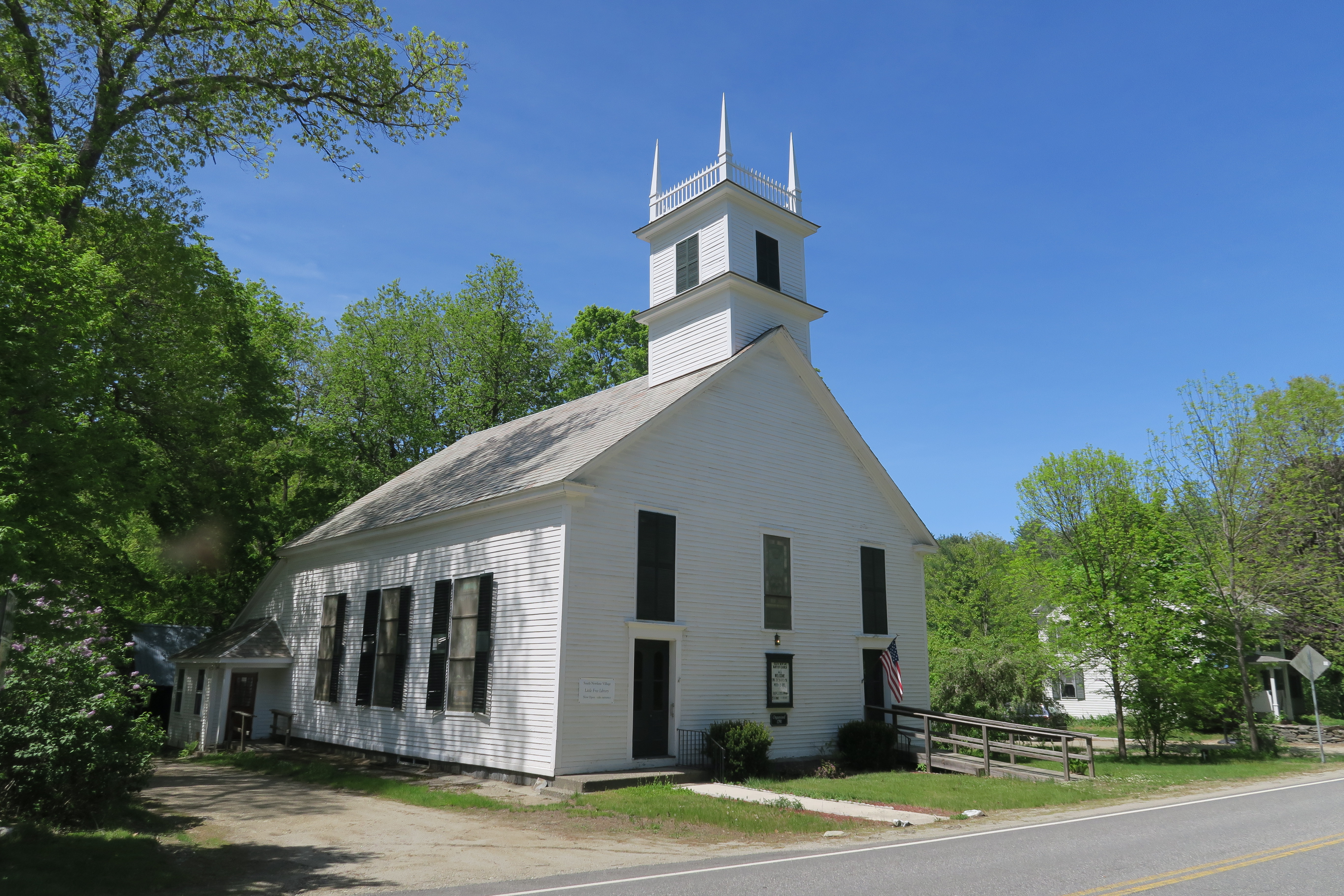
- South Newfane Baptist Church

- Location within Vermont
- Coordinates: 42°56′17″N 72°42′19″W
- Country: United States
- State: Vermont
- County: Windham
- Elevation: 620 ft (190 m)
- Time zone: UTC-5 (Eastern (EST))
  - Summer (DST): UTC-4 (EDT)
- ZIP code: 05351
- Area code: 802
- GNIS feature ID: 1459600

South Newfane is an unincorporated village in the town of Newfane, Windham County, Vermont, United States. The community is located along the Rock River, 4.1 miles (6.6 km) southwest of the village of Newfane.
