= Halifax, Vermont =

- Town
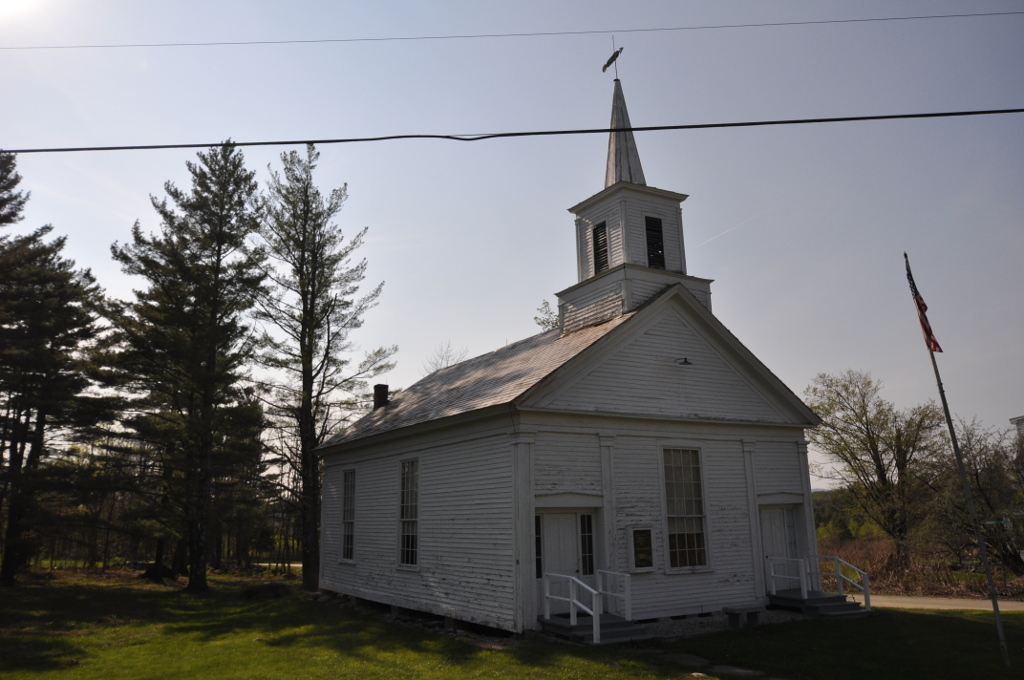
- Halifax Union Society

- Flag

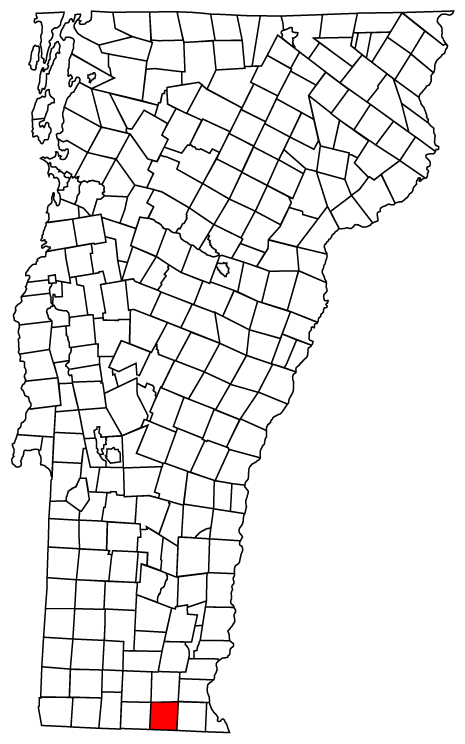
- Halifax, Vermont
- Coordinates: 42°46′15″N 72°44′58″W
- Country: United States
- State: Vermont
- County: Windham
- Chartered: May 11, 1750
- Communities: Halifax; Harrisville; West Halifax; Whitneyville

Area
  - Total: 39.8 sq mi (103.1 km^{2})
  - Land: 39.7 sq mi (102.9 km^{2})
  - Water: 0.039 sq mi (0.1 km^{2})
- Elevation: 1,618 ft (493 m)

Population (2020)
  - Total: 771
  - Density: 19/sq mi (7.5/km^{2})
- Time zone: UTC-5 (Eastern (EST))
  - Summer (DST): UTC-4 (EDT)
- ZIP Codes: 05358 (West Halifax); 05301 (Brattleboro); 05342 (Jacksonville)
- Area code: 802
- FIPS code: 50-31150
- GNIS feature ID: 1462113
- Website: halifaxvt.com

Halifax is a town in Windham County, Vermont, in the United States. As of the 2020 census, the town population was 771.

== History ==
Halifax was the second town chartered, west of the Connecticut River on May 11, 1750, by New Hampshire Governor Benning Wentworth, meaning Halifax is the second oldest town in the state after Bennington. The town was named for George Montagu-Dunk, 2nd Earl of Halifax.

== Geography ==
According to the United States Census Bureau, the town has a total area of 39.8 square miles (103.1 km^{2}), of which 39.8 square miles (103.0 km^{2}) is land and 0.1 square mile (0.1 km^{2}) (0.13%) is water.

== Demographics ==
Historical population
| Census | Pop. | Note | %± |
|---|---|---|---|
| 1790 | 1,309 | | — |
| 1800 | 1,600 | | 22.2% |
| 1810 | 1,758 | | 9.9% |
| 1820 | 1,567 | | −10.9% |
| 1830 | 1,562 | | −0.3% |
| 1840 | 1,399 | | −10.4% |
| 1850 | 1,133 | | −19.0% |
| 1860 | 1,126 | | −0.6% |
| 1870 | 1,029 | | −8.6% |
| 1880 | 852 | | −17.2% |
| 1890 | 702 | | −17.6% |
| 1900 | 662 | | −5.7% |
| 1910 | 635 | | −4.1% |
| 1920 | 504 | | −20.6% |
| 1930 | 390 | | −22.6% |
| 1940 | 353 | | −9.5% |
| 1950 | 343 | | −2.8% |
| 1960 | 268 | | −21.9% |
| 1970 | 295 | | 10.1% |
| 1980 | 488 | | 65.4% |
| 1990 | 588 | | 20.5% |
| 2000 | 782 | | 33.0% |
| 2010 | 720 | | −7.9% |
| 2020 | 771 | | 7.1% |
U.S. Decennial Census

As of the census of 2000, there were 782 people, 312 households, and 209 families residing in the town. The population density was 19.7 people per square mile (7.6/km^{2}). There were 493 housing units at an average density of 12.4 per square mile (4.8/km^{2}). The racial makeup of the town was 97.31% White, 0.26% Asian, and 2.43% from two or more races. Hispanic or Latino of any race were 1.15% of the population.

There were 312 households, out of which 32.1% had children under the age of 18 living with them, 51.9% were married couples living together, 9.9% had a female householder with no husband present, and 33.0% were non-families. 22.1% of all households were made up of individuals, and 8.7% had someone living alone who was 65 years of age or older. The average household size was 2.51 and the average family size was 2.92.

In the town, the population was spread out, with 24.7% under the age of 18, 5.4% from 18 to 24, 26.3% from 25 to 44, 29.4% from 45 to 64, and 14.2% who were 65 years of age or older. The median age was 42 years. For every 100 females, there were 98.0 males. For every 100 females age 18 and over, there were 93.1 males.

The median income for a household in the town was $36,458, and the median income for a family was $41,667. Males had a median income of $29,000 versus $23,542 for females. The per capita income for the town was $17,738. About 9.3% of families and 16.2% of the population were below the poverty line, including 21.2% of those under age 18 and 7.7% of those age 65 or over.

== Notable people ==
- Wyn Cooper, poet
- Augustus Wade Dwight, lawyer and soldier
- Almira Edson, watercolorist
- Kyra Markham, painter and actress
- Elisha Otis, inventor and entrepreneur of safe elevators
- Norton P. Otis, New York politician
- George Gilbert Swain, Wisconsin politician
