= Dover, Vermont =

- Town
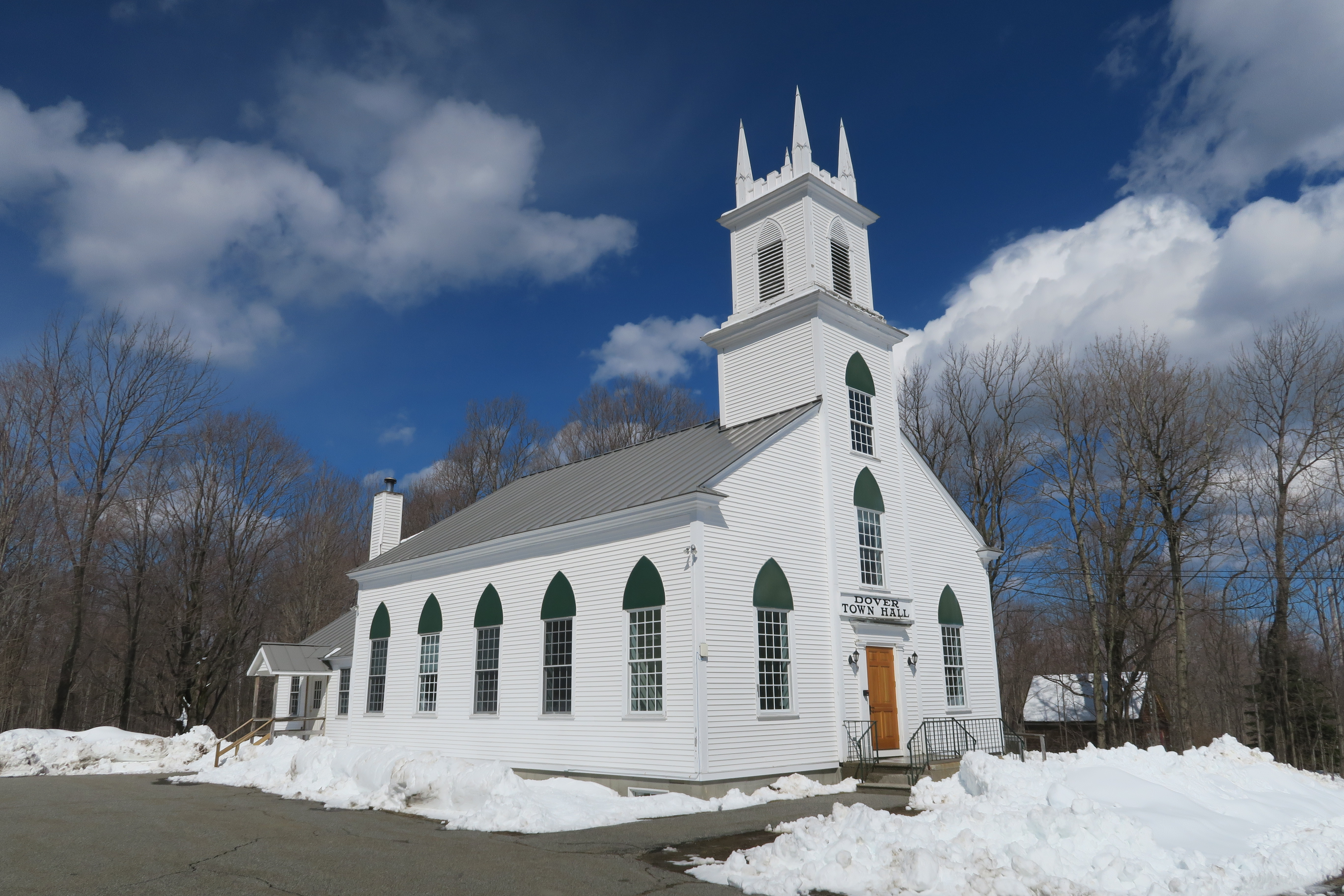
- Dover Town Hall

- Logo
- Motto: "Home of Mount Snow"
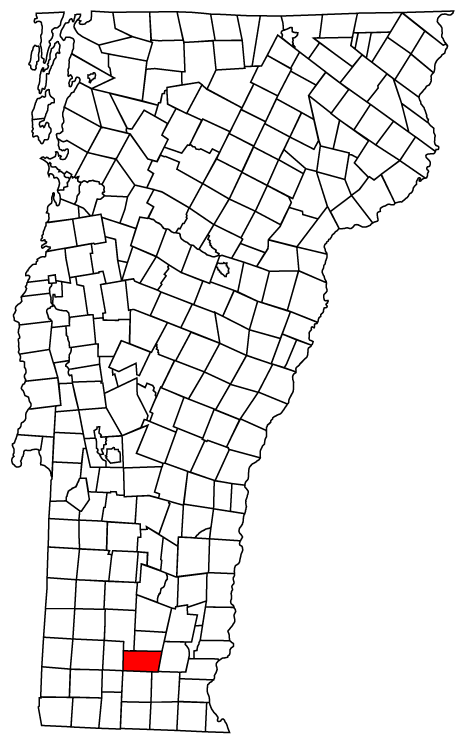
- Dover, Vermont
- Coordinates: 42°57′30″N 72°51′49″W
- Country: United States
- State: Vermont
- County: Windham
- Communities: Dover; East Dover; West Dover; Goose City

Area
  - Total: 35.3 sq mi (91.4 km^{2})
  - Land: 35.3 sq mi (91.4 km^{2})
  - Water: 0 sq mi (0.0 km^{2})
- Elevation: 2,067 ft (630 m)

Population (2020)
  - Total: 1,798
  - Density: 51/sq mi (19.7/km^{2})
- Time zone: UTC-5 (Eastern (EST))
  - Summer (DST): UTC-4 (EDT)
- ZIP Codes: 05356 (Dover); 05341 (East Dover)
- Area code: 802
- FIPS code: 50-17875
- GNIS feature ID: 1462083
- Website: www.doververmont.com

Dover is a town in Windham County, Vermont, United States. The population was 1,798 at the 2020 census. It is famed for being the location of the Mount Snow ski area.

== Geography ==
According to the United States Census Bureau, the town has a total area of 35.3 square miles (91 km^{2}), all land. The Rock River and the North Branch of the Deerfield River have their sources in the town.

=== Climate ===
This climatic region is typified by large seasonal temperature differences, with warm to hot (and often humid) summers and cold (sometimes severely cold) winters. According to the Köppen Climate Classification system, Dover has a humid continental climate, abbreviated "Dfb" on climate maps.

== Demographics ==
Historical population
Census	Pop.	Note	%±
1810	859		—
1820	829		−3.5%
1830	831		0.2%
1840	729		−12.3%
1850	709		−2.7%
1860	650		−8.3%
1870	635		−2.3%
1880	621		−2.2%
1890	524		−15.6%
1900	503		−4.0%
1910	377		−25.0%
1920	385		2.1%
1930	278		−27.8%
1940	244		−12.2%
1950	252		3.3%
1960	370		46.8%
1970	555		50.0%
1980	666		20.0%
1990	994		49.2%
2000	1,410		41.9%
2010	1,124		−20.3%
2020	1,798		60.0%
U.S. Decennial Census

At the 2000 census there were 1,410 people, 611 households, and 372 families in the town. The population density was 39.9 people per square mile (15.4 people/km^{2}). There were 2,749 housing units at an average density of 77.9 units per square mile (30.1 units/km^{2}). The racial makeup of the town was 97.66% White, 0.07% African American, 1.06% Asian, 0.35% from other races, and 0.85% from two or more races. Hispanic or Latino of any race were 1.21%.

Of the 611 households 27.5% had children under the age of 18 living with them, 51.4% were married couples living together, 6.2% had a female householder with no husband present, and 39.1% were non-families. 29.3% of households were one person and 5.6% were one person aged 65 or older. The average household size was 2.31 and the average family size was 2.86.

The age distribution was 22.2% under the age of 18, 5.8% from 18 to 24, 29.8% from 25 to 44, 31.1% from 45 to 64, and 11.1% 65 or older. The median age was 41 years. For every 100 females, there were 107.7 males. For every 100 females age 18 and over, there were 107.8 males.

The median household income was $43,824 and the median family income was $49,688. Males had a median income of $31,351 versus $26,985 for females. The per capita income for the town was $23,485. About 6.9% of families and 10.0% of the population were below the poverty line, including 18.6% of those under age 18 and 3.2% of those age 65 or over.

== Notable people ==
- Sherman Adams, Governor of New Hampshire
- Levi Chamberlain, missionary
- Kelly Clark, snowboarder; born in Dover; Olympic Gold Medalist
- Gardner Howe, state legislator
- Devin Logan, freeskier; Olympic Medalist
- Stoyan Christowe, state senator and author

== See also ==
- West Dover, Vermont
