= Almira Edson =

American female painter (1803–1886)

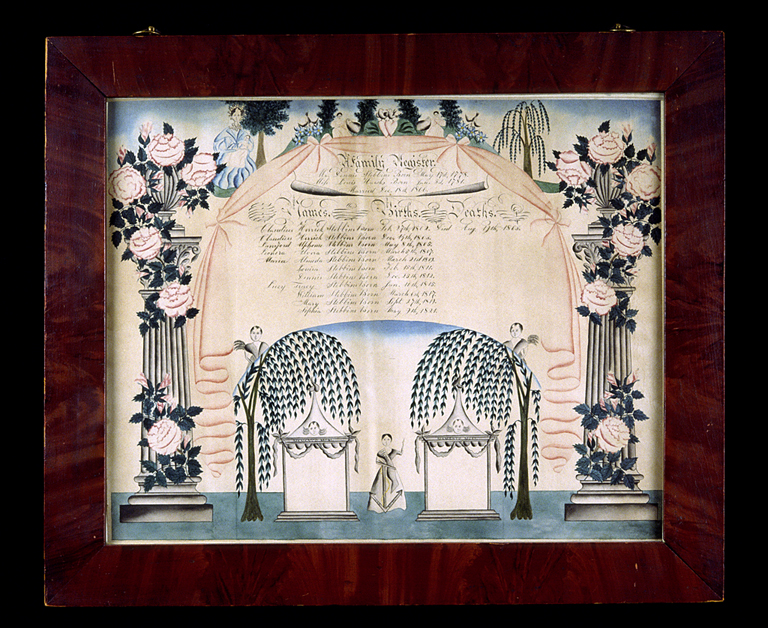

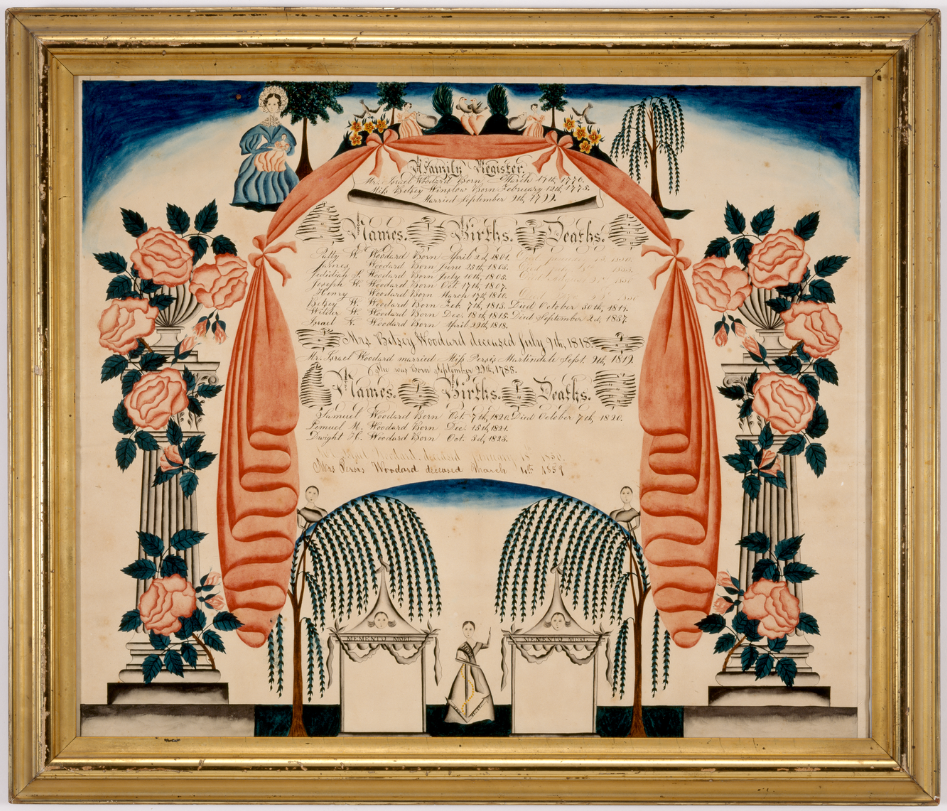

Almira Edson (January 20, 1803 – December 14, 1886) was an American folk artist, known as the painter of a series of distinctive family registers.

Edson was born in Halifax, Vermont, the daughter of Jesse and Rebecca Edson. Jesse died in 1805, and Rebecca married Captain Edward Adams of nearby Colrain, Massachusetts, where her family moved when Almira was seven. As an adult she painted, in or near Halifax, Vermont, a series of family registers which are unusual in that they also incorporate features of the mourning picture.

Her first work to come to public attention was the register of the Woodard family, painted around 1837 in watercolor and ink, which was discussed by Jean Lipman and Alice Winchester in The Flowering of American Folk Art 1776–1876 in 1974. Some years later another register, dated around 1838 and painted for David and Anna Niles, appeared at auction. Other registers, for Dennis and Lois Stebbins, Oliver and Olive Wilkinson, and James and Jane Clark, are also known. The Clark register is inscribed, "Executed by Almira Edson, Halifax, Vt." All have been ascribed to Edson based on stylistic similarities.

In 1841, unmarried, Edson joined the religious community in Putney, Vermont founded by John Humphrey Noyes. There she fell in love with another community member, John R. Lyvere. The couple asked Noyes for permission to marry, but he refused; consequently, while he was away the pair eloped to Hinsdale, New Hampshire, where they wed on September 18, 1842. Noyes banished them upon hearing of their disobedience, and they moved to Vernon, Connecticut, where Edson remained until her death. Her last known register, for William C. and Emily Porter Russell, was painted around 1847 in Ellington, Connecticut, near Vernon. Little else is known of her life, although she was the subject of research by collectors Arthur and Sybil Kern.

Edson's family register for the Clarks is currently owned by the New-York Historical Society. The Stebbins family register is held by Historic Deerfield in its collections. The Niles family register sold at auction in 2018 for $4,305.
