= West Dover, Vermont =

- West Dover Village Historic District
- U.S. National Register of Historic Places
- U.S. Historic district
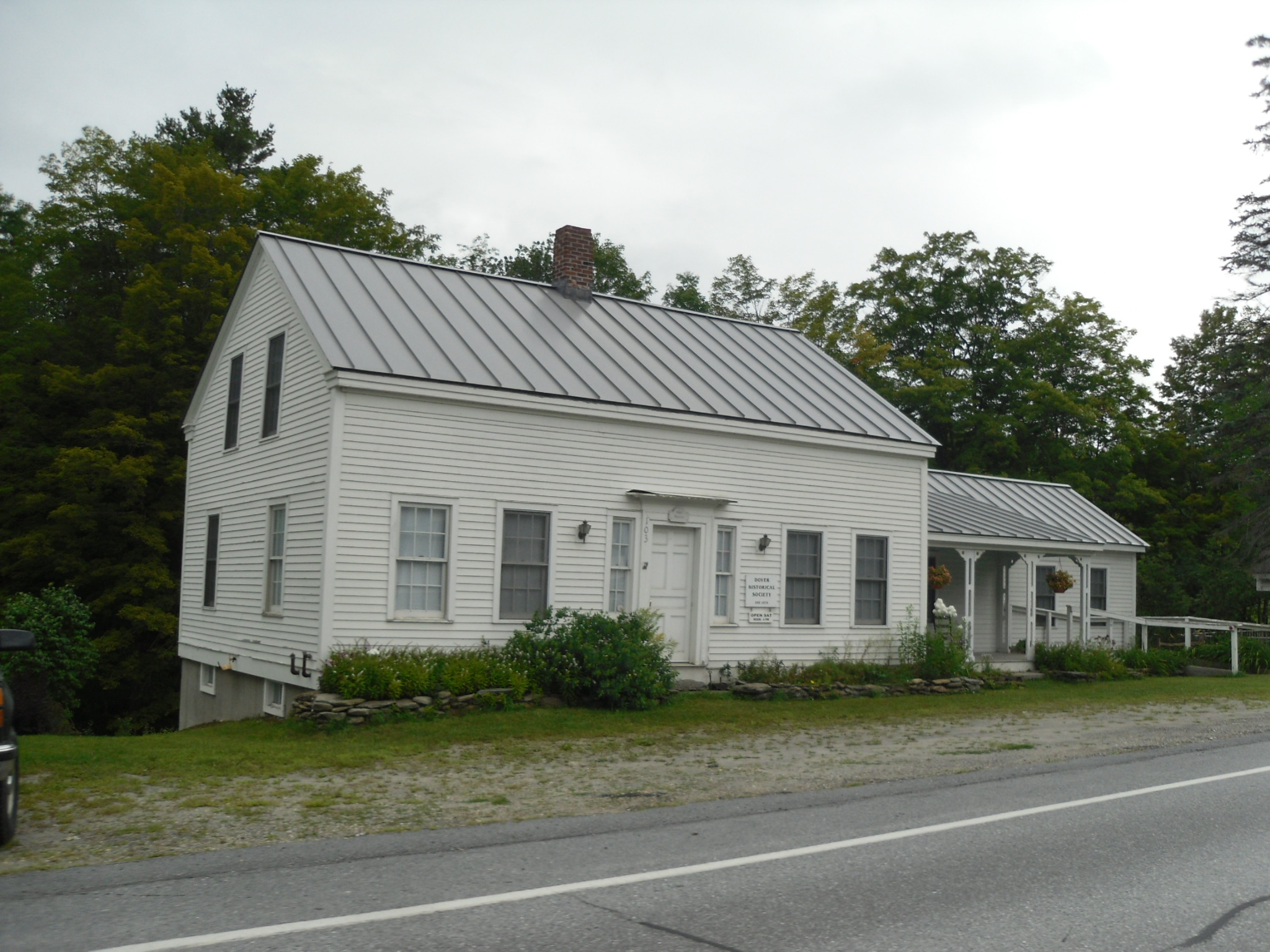

- Location within Vermont Location within the United States
- Location: Rt. 100, Valley View, Cross Town, Parsonage, Dorr Fitch, and Bogle Rds., Dover, Vermont
- Coordinates: 42°56′14″N 72°51′3″W
- Area: 40 acres (16 ha)
- Built: 1805
- Architectural style: Mid 19th Century Revival, Italianate, Cape
- NRHP reference No.: 85003381
- Added to NRHP: October 24, 1985

West Dover is a village in the central part of Dover, Windham County, Vermont, United States. The village center, located on Vermont Route 100 at Cross Town and Valley View Roads, was listed on the National Register of Historic Places in 1985 as the West Dover Historic District. The village is a major service point for the nearby Mount Snow ski area. The ZIP Code for West Dover is 05356

== Geography ==
West Dover is actually located in south-central Dover, and extends along Vermont Route 100, as it follows the North Branch Deerfield River. The central portion of the village is strung along VT 100 between Cross Town Road in the northwest and Dorr Fitch Road to the southeast, shortly before VT 100 crosses the river and turns south toward Wilmington.

== History ==
West Dover was settled in 1796, when the area was part of Wardsboro, and was incorporated into Dover when that town was chartered in 1810. The village grew economically in the 19th century due to the construction of mills along the river. The first mill, a sawmill, was built in 1796, and was expanded to process wool through the first half of the 19th century. The mill complex was destroyed by fire in 1901, bringing an end to that source of economic activity. Only traces of the mill complex survive today, but the village has a fine assortment of Federal and Greek Revival buildings that give it its character. In the 20th century the village benefitted from the state's promotion of the out-of-state purchase of farms for recreational purposes, and the growth of the nearby ski areas.

== See also ==
- National Register of Historic Places listings in Windham County, Vermont
