= Robert Fritz =

American author, consultant, composer and filmmaker (born 1943)

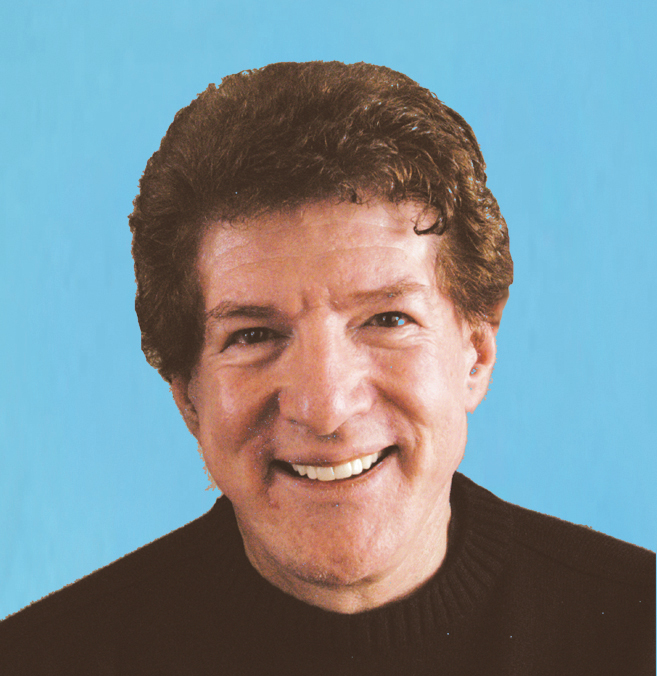
- Robert J. Fritz, January 2010
- Born: 1943 (age 82–83); Cambridge, Massachusetts
- Education: Boston Conservatory
- Occupations: Management consultant, author, composer, filmmaker
- Spouse: Ross Hannaman
- Children: 2
- Website: http://www.robertfritz.com

Robert Jordan Fritz (born 1943 in Cambridge, Massachusetts) is an American author, management consultant, composer, and filmmaker. He is known for his development of structural dynamics, the study of how structural relationships impact behavior from individuals to organizations. And he is known for developing the Technologies For Creating curriculum, which shows people how to create what they want in their lives.

His books, starting with The Path of Least Resistance, develop the theory and application of structural dynamics and the creative process.

== Bibliography ==
- Fritz, Robert (2007). Elements: The Writings of Robert Fritz. Newfane Press. ISBN 978-0-9725536-4-3.
- Bodaken, Bruce; Fritz, Robert (2006). The Managerial Moment of Truth: The Essential Step in Helping People Improve Performance. Free Press. ISBN 978-0-7432-8852-1.
- Fritz, Robert (2003). Your Life As Art. Newfane Press. ISBN 978-0-9725536-0-5.
- —— (2011). The Path of Least Resistance for Managers Revised and Expanded Second Edition. Berrett-Koehler. ISBN 978-0-9725-5366-7.
- —— (1996). Corporate Tides:The Inescapable Laws of Organizational Structure. Berrett-Koehler. ISBN 978-1-881052-88-3.
- —— (1993). Creating: A Practical Guide to the Creative Process and How To Use It To Create Anything. Ballantine Books. ISBN 978-0-449-90801-3.
- —— (1989). Path of Least Resistance: Learning to Become the Creative Force in Your Own Life. Ballantine Books. ISBN 978-0-449-90337-7.

== Media & music ==
- Overload - 2009 feature film (written and directed by Fritz)

Awards:
- Boston International Film Festival - Indie Spirit Special Recognition Award
- Los Angeles Reel Film Festival - Honorable Mention
- Honolulu Film Festival - Aloha Accolade Award for Excellence in Filmmaking
- Los Angeles Cinema Festival of Hollywood - Award of Merit for Narrative Feature
- Accolade Competition - Award of Merit
- Los Angeles Movie Awards - Award of Excellence (television), Best Original Score, Best Screenplay, Best Actress

- Creating - Canadian television series (directed and co-hosted by Fritz)
- Celtic Ladies
- The Little Pinecone - Audio CD (Story and music by Fritz)
- Elmer's Extraordinary Christmas - Audio CD (Story and music by Fritz)
- The Top - Audio CD (Story and music by Fritz)
