= Newfane (village), Vermont =

Newfane, Vermont
- Village
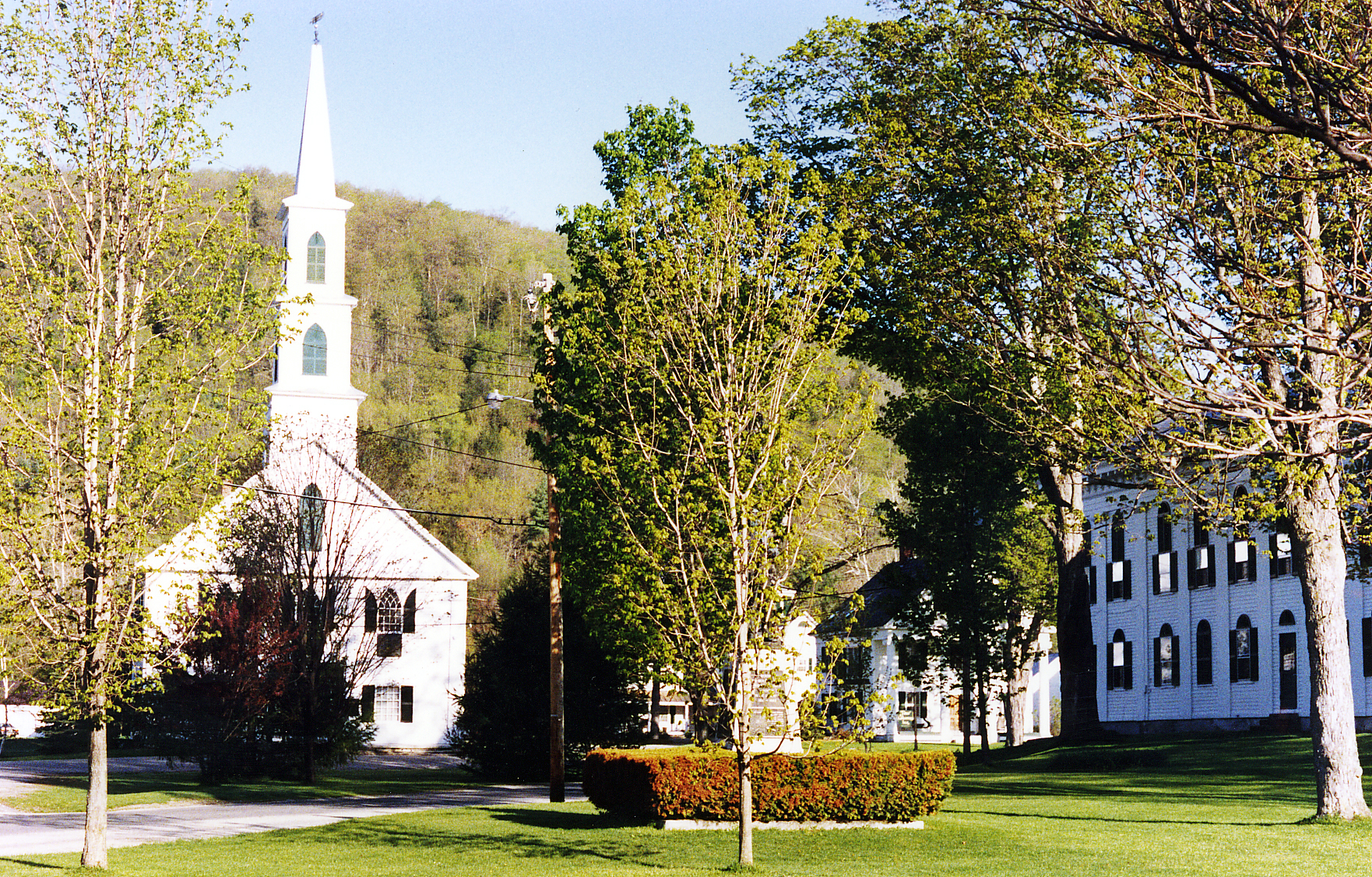
- Newfane in 2005

- Location within the state of Vermont
- Coordinates: 42°59′15″N 72°39′17″W
- Country: United States
- State: Vermont
- County: Windham
- Town: Newfane

Area
  - Total: 0.18 sq mi (0.46 km^{2})
  - Land: 0.18 sq mi (0.46 km^{2})
  - Water: 0 sq mi (0.00 km^{2})
- Elevation: 564 ft (172 m)

Population (2020)
  - Total: 87
  - Density: 490/sq mi (190/km^{2})
- Time zone: UTC-5 (Eastern (EST))
  - Summer (DST): UTC-4 (EDT)
- ZIP code: 05345
- Area code: 802
- FIPS code: 50-48325
- GNIS feature ID: 2378318

Newfane is an incorporated village in the town of Newfane in Windham County, Vermont, United States. The population was 87 at the 2020 census.

Most of the village was listed on the National Register of Historic Places in 1983 as the Newfane Village Historic District. It is centered on the village green. It includes over 60 buildings. Greek Revival is the dominant architectural style. The Windham County Courthouse, which was built in 1825, is included in the district. Also, the Historical Society of Windham County is headquartered in the town.

== Geography ==
The village of Newfane is located in the eastern part of the town of Newfane, on the banks of Smith Creek, a tributary of the West River. It is set on a relatively flat terrace on the east side of the creek, bounded on the east by an old Boston & Maine Railroad branch-line right-of-way. Main Street (Vermont Route 30) runs north-northeast through the village, with West Street branching off northward at the village common.

According to the United States Census Bureau, the village has a total area of 0.2 square mile (0.5 km^{2}), all land.

== Demographics ==
Historical population
Census	Pop.	Note	%±
1910	136		—
1920	122		−10.3%
1930	160		31.1%
1940	160		0.0%
1950	156		−2.5%
1960	146		−6.4%
1970	183		25.3%
1980	119		−35.0%
1990	164		37.8%
2000	116		−29.3%
2010	118		1.7%
2020	87		−26.3%
U.S. Decennial Census

As of the census of 2000, there were 116 people, 61 households, and 32 families residing in the village. The population density was 654.4 people per square mile (248.8/km^{2}). There were 68 housing units at an average density of 383.6/sq mi (145.9/km^{2}). The racial makeup of the village was 97.41% White, 0.86% from other races, and 1.72% from two or more races. Hispanic or Latino of any race were 0.86% of the population.

There were 61 households, out of which 21.3% had children under the age of 18 living with them, 45.9% were married couples living together, 6.6% had a female householder with no husband present, and 47.5% were non-families. 41.0% of all households were made up of individuals, and 21.3% had someone living alone who was 65 years of age or older. The average household size was 1.90 and the average family size was 2.56.

In the village, the population was spread out, with 15.5% under the age of 18, 2.6% from 18 to 24, 27.6% from 25 to 44, 32.8% from 45 to 64, and 21.6% who were 65 years of age or older. The median age was 46 years. For every 100 females, there were 73.1 males. For every 100 females age 18 and over, there were 71.9 males.

The median income for a household in the village was $33,250, and the median income for a family was $46,250. Males had a median income of $24,688 versus $48,000 for females. The per capita income for the village was $22,028. There were 5.9% of families and 8.2% of the population living below the poverty line, including no under eighteens and 14.7% of those over 64.

== See also ==
- National Register of Historic Places listings in Windham County, Vermont
