= Marshall Otis Howe =

American politician

Member of the Vermont House of Representatives from the Newfane, Windham district
- In office 1882–1882

Personal details
- Born: October 4, 1832 Wardsboro, Vermont
- Died: May 13, 1919 (aged 86) Newfane, Vermont
- Spouse: Gertrude Isabel Dexter
- Children: Arthur Otis Howe
- Parent(s): Otis Howe; Sally (Marsh) Howe
- Profession: farmer, school superintendent, Justice of the Peace

Marshall Otis Howe (October 4, 1832 – May 13, 1919) was a farmer, school superintendent and Justice of the Peace from Newfane, Vermont and member of the Vermont House of Representatives, serving in 1882.

== Personal background and family relations ==
Marshall Otis Howe was born in Wardsboro, Vermont to Otis Howe (1793–1872) and Sally (Marsh) Howe (1796–1877). He was married on 15 August 1866 to Gertrude Isabel Dexter, and was a farmer in Newfane, Vermont and served as a school superintendent and Justice of the Peace. In 1882 he was elected to a one-year term in the Vermont House of Representatives. Howe died at his home in Newfane on 13 May 1919. Howe was a direct descendant of John Howe (1602–1680) who arrived in Massachusetts Bay Colony in 1630 from Brinklow, Warwickshire, England and settled in Sudbury, Massachusetts. Marshall Otis Howe was also a descendant of Edmund Rice, an early immigrant to Massachusetts Bay Colony, as follows:

- Marshall Otis Howe, son of

- Otis Howe (1793-1872), son of
- Gardner Howe (1759-1854), son of
- Priscilla Rice (1731-?), daughter of

- Luke Rice (1689-1754), son of
- Daniel Rice (1655-1737), son of
- Edward Rice (1622-1712), son of

- Edmund Rice, (ca1594-1663)
