= Newfane, Vermont =

- Town
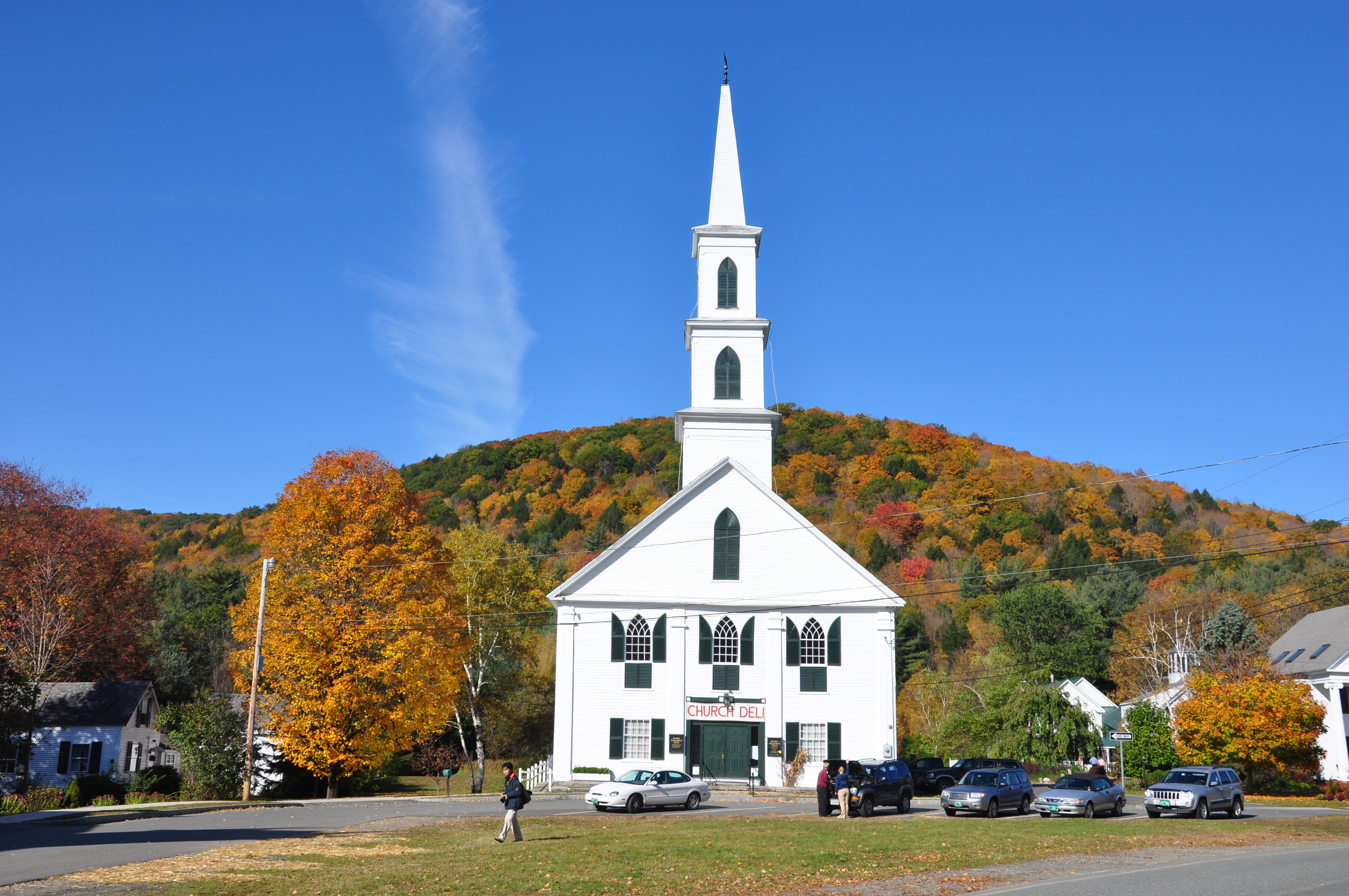
- A church in Newfane

- Seal

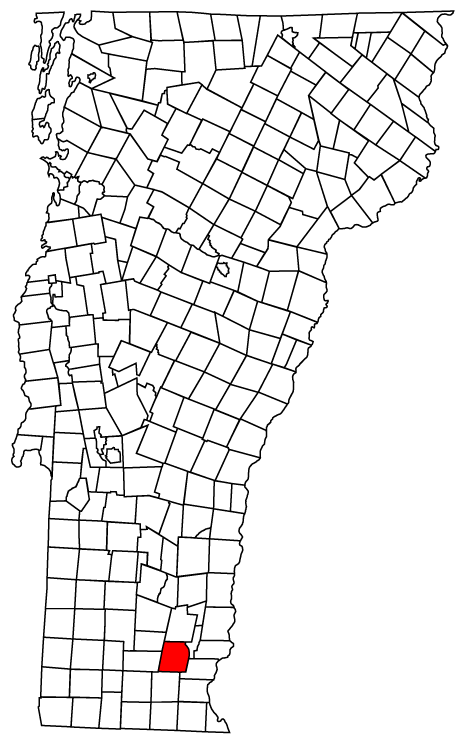
- Location in Vermont
- Coordinates: 43°00′25″N 72°43′20″W
- Country: United States
- State: Vermont
- County: Windham
- Chartered: 1761
- Communities: Newfane; South Newfane; Williamsville

Area
  - Total: 40.4 sq mi (104.6 km^{2})
  - Land: 40.2 sq mi (104.2 km^{2})
  - Water: 0.15 sq mi (0.4 km^{2})
- Elevation: 1,230 ft (370 m)

Population (2020)
  - Total: 1,645
  - Density: 15.8/sq mi (6.1/km^{2})
- Time zone: UTC-5 (Eastern (EST))
  - Summer (DST): UTC-4 (EDT)
- ZIP Codes: 05345 (Newfane); 05351 (South Newfane); 05362 (Williamsville)
- Area code: 802
- FIPS code: 50-48400
- GNIS feature ID: 1462159
- Website: www.newfanevt.com

Newfane is the shire town (county seat) of Windham County, Vermont, United States. The population was 1,645 at the 2020 census. The town includes the villages of Newfane, Williamsville, and South Newfane.

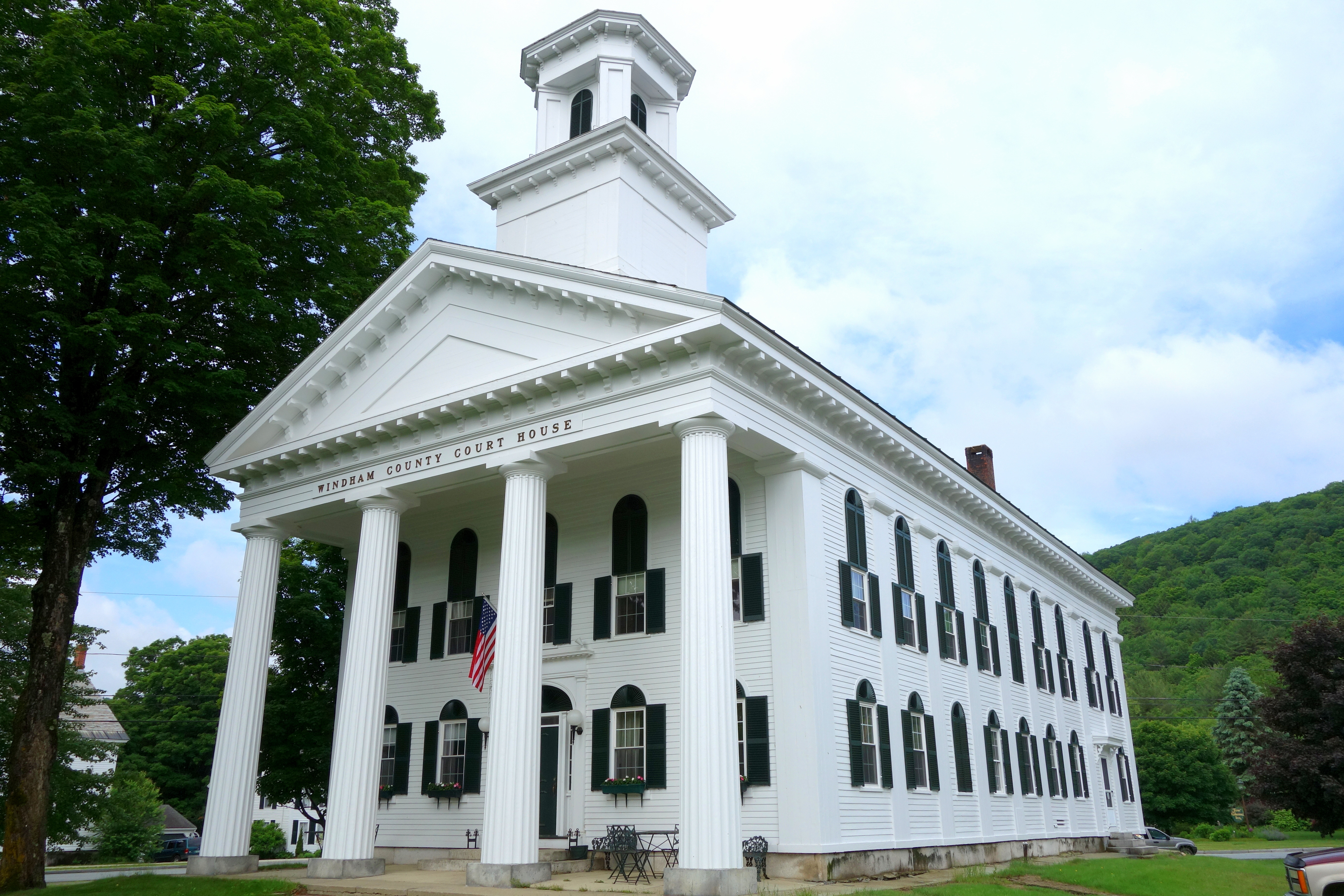
Windham County Court House

== History ==
One of the New Hampshire grants, the town was chartered on June 19, 1753, by Governor Benning Wentworth, who named it Fane after John Fane, the 7th Earl of Westmoreland. But hostilities during the French and Indian War prevented its settlement. Because a first town meeting was not held within the required five years, the charter was deemed null and void. So Wentworth issued an entirely new charter on November 3, 1761, as New Fane. The town was settled in 1766 by families from Worcester County, Massachusetts. Newfane became the shire town of the county before 1812. A village was built atop Newfane Hill, including the county buildings. But because of winter travel difficulties, it was relocated to the flatland below in 1825, until 1882 called Fayetteville after the Marquis de Lafayette.

The town has a diversified terrain, with both high hills and deep valleys. Farmers found good soil for cultivation on the intervales, and for grazing livestock on the uplands. Various streams provided water power for mills, and by 1859 industries included manufacturers of both leather and linseed oil, two flour mills, two lumber mills, and a large carriage factory. As a result, Newfane became prosperous during the 19th century, when it built the Federal, Greek Revival and Victorian architecture that today makes it a tourist destination.

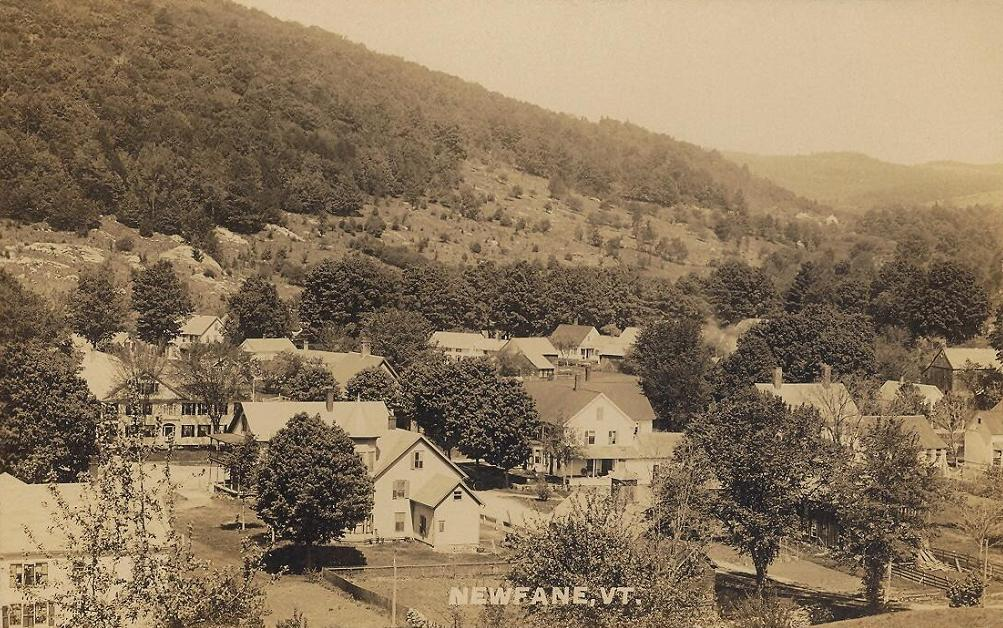
Bird's-eye view in 1909

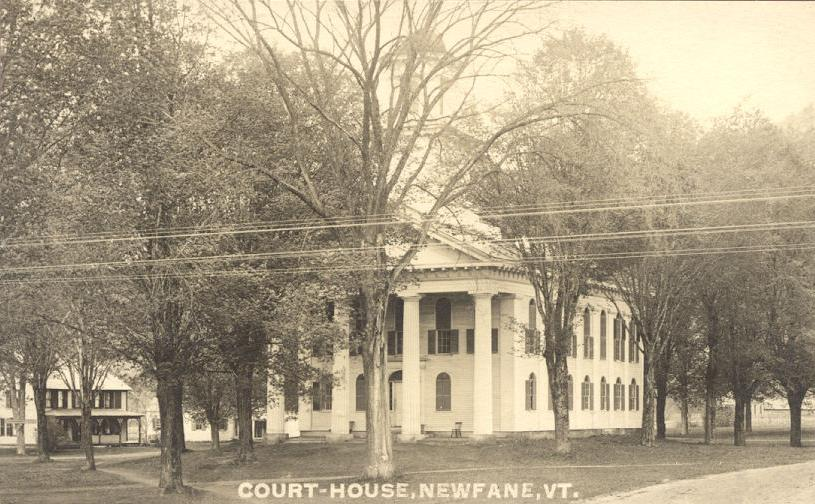
Courthouse, built in 1825

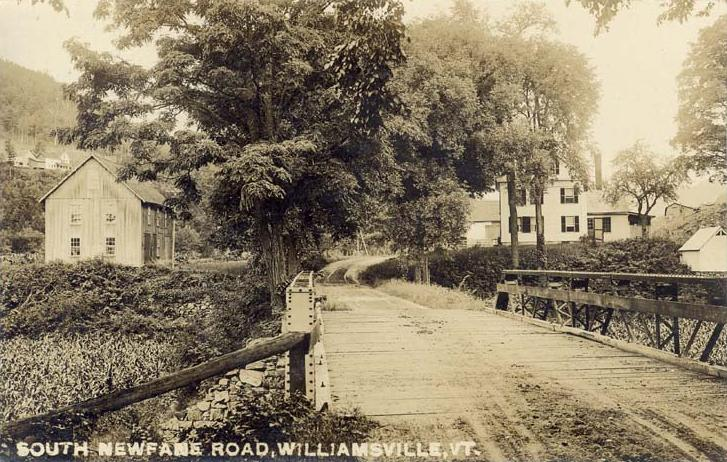
Scene in Williamsville

== Geography ==
According to the United States Census Bureau, the town has a total area of 40.4 square miles (104.6 km^{2}), of which 40.2 square miles (104.2 km^{2}) is land and 0.1 square mile (0.4 km^{2}) (0.35%) is water. The West and Rock rivers flow through the town.

Newfane is crossed by Vermont Route 30.

The West River in Newfane yielded the largest gold nugget ever found in New England, at 6.5oz.

=== Climate ===
This climatic region is typified by large seasonal temperature differences, with warm to hot (and often humid) summers and cold (sometimes severely cold) winters. According to the Köppen Climate Classification system, Newfane has a humid continental climate, abbreviated "Dfb" on climate maps.

== Demographics ==
Historical population
Census	Pop.	Note	%±
1790	660		—
1800	1,000		51.5%
1810	1,276		27.6%
1820	1,506		18.0%
1830	1,441		−4.3%
1840	1,043		−27.6%
1850	1,304		25.0%
1860	1,192		−8.6%
1870	1,113		−6.6%
1880	1,031		−7.4%
1890	952		−7.7%
1900	905		−4.9%
1910	820		−9.4%
1920	710		−13.4%
1930	662		−6.8%
1940	672		1.5%
1950	708		5.4%
1960	714		0.8%
1970	900		26.1%
1980	1,129		25.4%
1990	1,555		37.7%
2000	1,680		8.0%
2010	1,726		2.7%
2020	1,645		−4.7%
U.S. Decennial Census

As of the census of 2000, there were 1,680 people, 693 households, and 464 families residing in the town. The population density was 41.7 people per square mile (16.1/km^{2}). There were 977 housing units at an average density of 24.3 per square mile (9.4/km^{2}). The racial makeup of the town was 98.10% White, 0.18% Black or African American, 0.30% Native American, 0.12% Asian, 0.12% Pacific Islander, 0.06% from other races, and 1.13% from two or more races. Hispanic or Latino of any race were 0.95% of the population.

There were 693 households, out of which 31.3% had children under the age of 18 living with them, 57.1% were married couples living together, 6.3% had a female householder with no husband present, and 33.0% were non-families. 24.1% of all households were made up of individuals, and 7.8% had someone living alone who was 65 years of age or older. The average household size was 2.42 and the average family size was 2.88.

In the town, the population was spread out, with 23.9% under the age of 18, 4.6% from 18 to 24, 27.6% from 25 to 44, 32.4% from 45 to 64, and 11.5% who were 65 years of age or older. The median age was 42 years. For every 100 females, there were 91.6 males. For every 100 females age 18 and over, there were 92.8 males.

The median income for a household in the town was $45,735, and the median income for a family was $51,328. Males had a median income of $33,882 versus $27,426 for females. The per capita income for the town was $22,215. About 4.7% of families and 5.1% of the population were below the poverty line, including 2.1% of those under age 18 and 7.9% of those age 65 or over.

== Site of interest ==
- Williamsville Covered Bridge, built in 1870

== Notable people ==
- Harrison G. O. Blake, US congressman
- Paul A. Chase, Associate Justice of the Vermont Supreme Court
- Ralph B. DeWitt, Brigadier general in the Marine Corps
- Asa Belknap Foster, businessman and politician
- Frank L. Fish, Associate Justice of the Vermont Supreme Court
- Robert Fritz, author, composer and film-maker
- John Kenneth Galbraith, economist
- Arthur Otis Howe, Vermont state representative and senator
- Marshall Otis Howe, Vermont state legislator
- Luke Knowlton, founder of Newfane, Justice of the Vermont Supreme Court
- Paul Holland Knowlton, businessman and politician
- John H. Merrifield, politician
- Archer Mayor, author of mystery novels
- Henriette Mantel, Emmy Award-winning writer, actress, and stand-up comic
- Lee Stephen Tillotson, Adjutant General of the Vermont National Guard

== Popular culture ==
In 2006, Newfane became one of the first American towns to pass a resolution endorsing the impeachment of President George W. Bush.
