= Gardner Howe =

American politician

Gardner Howe (November 20, 1759 – July 4, 1854) was a farmer from Dover, Vermont and member of the Vermont House of Representatives, serving in 1816 and 1823.

== Personal background and family relations ==
Gardner Howe was born in Shrewsbury, Massachusetts to Jotham Howe (1728-1809) and Priscilla (Rice) Howe (1731-1819). He was a farmer in Dover, Massachusetts and served in the Continental Army during the Revolution. On October 29, 1789 he married Abigail Sherman (1771-1843) of Grafton, Massachusetts. In 1816 he was elected to a one-year term in the Vermont House of Representatives, and he was re-elected in 1823. Howe died at his home in Dover on July 4, 1854. Howe was a direct descendant of John Howe (1602-1680), who arrived in Massachusetts Bay Colony in 1630 from Brinklow, Warwickshire, England and settled in Sudbury, Massachusetts. Gardner Howe was also a descendant of Edmund Rice, an early immigrant to Massachusetts Bay Colony, as follows:

- Gardner Howe, son of:
- Priscilla Rice (1731-1819), daughter of:

- Luke Rice (1689-1754), son of:
- Daniel Rice (1655-1737), son of:
- Edward Rice (1622-1712), son of:

- Edmund Rice, (ca1594-1663)
