= Windham County, Vermont =

County in Vermont, United States

- County
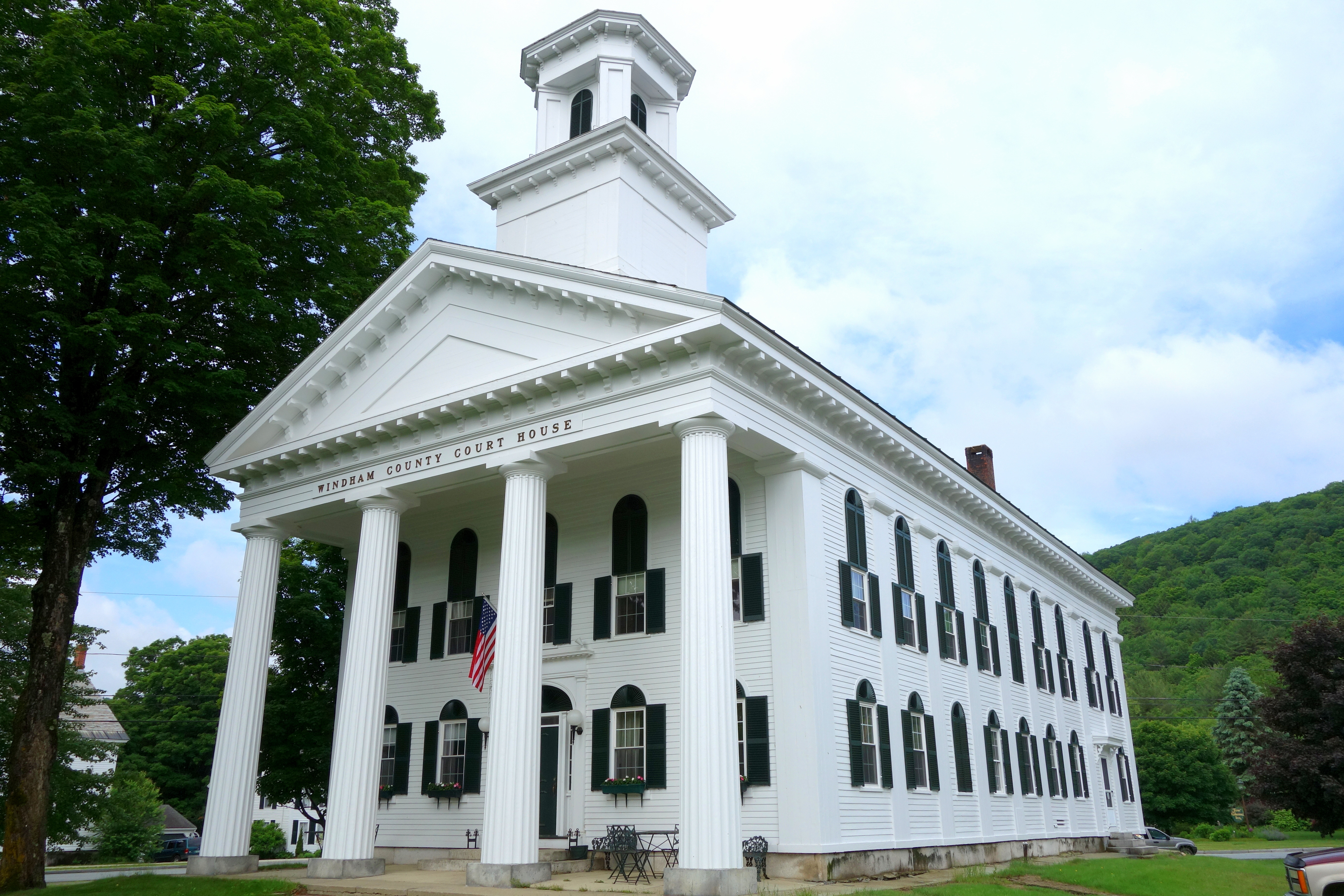
- Windham County courthouse in Newfane

- Location within the U.S. state of Vermont
- Coordinates: 42°59′55″N 72°40′07″W
- Country: United States
- State: Vermont
- Founded: 1781
- Named for: Windham, Vermont, which was named for Windham, Connecticut
- Shire Town: Newfane
- Largest town: Brattleboro

Area
  - Total: 798 sq mi (2,070 km^{2})
  - Land: 785 sq mi (2,030 km^{2})
  - Water: 13 sq mi (34 km^{2}) 1.6%

Population (2020)
  - Total: 45,905
  - Estimate (2025): 45,204 ▼
  - Density: 58.5/sq mi (22.6/km^{2})
- Time zone: UTC−5 (Eastern)
  - Summer (DST): UTC−4 (EDT)
- Congressional district: At-large

Windham County is a county located in the U.S. state of Vermont. As of the 2020 census, the population was 45,905. The shire town (county seat) is Newfane, and the largest municipality is the town of Brattleboro.

== History ==
Fort Bridgman, Vernon, was burned in 1755, a casualty of the French and Indian War. The Court of Common Pleas (established 1768) of the County of Cumberland (established July 3, 1766) of the Province of New York was moved to the town of Westminster in 1772. On July 4, 1776, the Province of New York became an independent state.

On January 15, 1777, Vermont declared its independence from New York, and functioned as an independent republic until statehood in 1791. Cumberland County (N.Y.) and Gloucester County (N.Y.) were extinguished when Vermont declared its independence from New York; Albany County (N.Y.) and Charlotte County (now Washington County, N.Y.) were eliminated from Vermont.

Unity County was formed March 17, 1778, the eastern of the two original Vermont Republic counties. Unity County was renamed Cumberland County on March 21, 1778. Cumberland County and Bennington County (the western original county) exchanged land, adjusting their early border. On February 16, 1781 Rutland County was created from Bennington County, and Orange, Windham and Windsor Counties were created from Cumberland County. Some authors assume Cumberland County was renamed Windham County in 1781. Several original sources indicate Cumberland County was dissolved rather than renamed. This was probably to make a clean legal break from any connection with Cumberland County, New York, as some authors indicate the Cumberland County, Vermont Republic, records remained in Windham County. Newfane became the Shire Town of Windham County before 1812.

== Geography ==
According to the U.S. Census Bureau, the county has a total area of 798 square miles (2,070 km^{2}), of which 785 square miles (2,030 km^{2}) is land and 13 square miles (34 km^{2}) (1.6%) is water. It is the third-largest county in Vermont by land area.

=== Adjacent counties ===
- Windsor County - north
- Sullivan County, New Hampshire - northeast
- Cheshire County, New Hampshire - east
- Franklin County, Massachusetts - south
- Bennington County - west

=== Reservoirs ===
- Ball Mountain Lake
- Harriman Reservoir (also sometimes called Lake Whitingham or Whitingham Reservoir)
- Townshend Lake

=== National protected areas ===
- Green Mountain National Forest (part)
- Silvio O. Conte National Fish and Wildlife Refuge (part)

== Demographics ==
Historical population
Census	Pop.	Note	%±
1790	17,572		—
1800	23,581		34.2%
1810	26,760		13.5%
1820	28,457		6.3%
1830	28,748		1.0%
1840	27,442		−4.5%
1850	29,062		5.9%
1860	26,982		−7.2%
1870	26,036		−3.5%
1880	26,763		2.8%
1890	26,547		−0.8%
1900	26,660		0.4%
1910	26,932		1.0%
1920	26,373		−2.1%
1930	26,015		−1.4%
1940	27,850		7.1%
1950	28,749		3.2%
1960	29,776		3.6%
1970	33,074		11.1%
1980	36,933		11.7%
1990	41,588		12.6%
2000	44,216		6.3%
2010	44,513		0.7%
2020	45,905		3.1%
2025 (est.)	45,204	▼	−1.5%
U.S. Decennial Census; 1790–1960 1900–1990; 1990–2000 2010–2018

=== 2020 census ===
As of the 2020 census, the county had a population of 45,905. Of the residents, 17.5% were under the age of 18 and 23.7% were 65 years of age or older; the median age was 47.6 years. For every 100 females there were 97.7 males, and for every 100 females age 18 and over there were 96.0 males.

The racial makeup of the county was 90.1% White, 1.2% Black or African American, 0.3% American Indian and Alaska Native, 1.1% Asian, 1.1% from some other race, and 6.2% from two or more races. Hispanic or Latino residents of any race comprised 2.9% of the population.

There were 20,388 households in the county, of which 22.6% had children under the age of 18 living with them and 27.8% had a female householder with no spouse or partner present. About 34.5% of all households were made up of individuals and 16.1% had someone living alone who was 65 years of age or older.

There were 29,916 housing units, of which 31.8% were vacant. Among occupied housing units, 68.6% were owner-occupied and 31.4% were renter-occupied. The homeowner vacancy rate was 1.5% and the rental vacancy rate was 6.3%.

Windham County, Vermont – Racial and ethnic composition Note: the US Census treats Hispanic/Latino as an ethnic category. This table excludes Latinos from the racial categories and assigns them to a separate category. Hispanics/Latinos may be of any race.
Race / Ethnicity (NH = Non-Hispanic)	Pop 2000	Pop 2010	Pop 2020	% 2000	% 2010	% 2020
White alone (NH)	42,452	41,906	41,010	96.01%	94.14%	89.33%
Black or African American alone (NH)	210	384	495	0.45%	0.86%	1.07%
Native American or Alaska Native alone (NH)	92	107	99	0.20%	0.24%	0.21%
Asian alone (NH)	342	460	493	0.77%	1.03%	1.07%
Pacific Islander alone (NH)	14	18	8	0.03%	0.04%	0.01%
Other race alone (NH)	47	59	243	0.10%	0.13%	0.52%
Mixed race or Multiracial (NH)	566	759	2,224	1.28%	1.70%	4.84%
Hispanic or Latino (any race)	493	820	1,333	1.11%	1.84%	2.90%
Total	44,216	44,513	45,905	100.00%	100.00%	100.00%

=== 2010 census ===
As of the 2010 United States census, 44,513 people, 19,290 households, and 11,453 families resided in the county. The population density was 56.7 inhabitants per square mile (21.9/km^{2}). There were 29,735 housing units at an average density of 37.9 units per square mile (14.6 units/km^{2}). The county's racial makeup was 95.3% white, 1.0% Asian, 0.9% black or African American, 0.3% American Indian, 0.5% from other races, and 2.0% from two or more races. Those of Hispanic or Latino origin made up 1.8% of the population. The largest ancestry groups were:

- (Republic of Ireland) 21.8% Irish
- (England) 21.7% English
- (France) 12.3% French
- (Germany) 11.7% German
- (Italy) 8.6% Italian
- (United States) 8.2% American
- (Poland) 5.5% Polish
- (Canada) 4.9% French Canadian
- (Scotland) 4.5% Scottish
- (Northern Ireland) 3.2% Scotch-Irish
- (Sweden) 3.0% Swedish
- (Wales) 1.2% Welsh

Of the 19,290 households, 26.2% had children under the age of 18 living with them, 44.8% were married couples living together, 10.1% had a female householder with no husband present, 40.6% were non-families, and 31.8% of all households were made up of individuals. The average household size was 2.23 and the average family size was 2.79. The median age was 44.9 years.

The county's median household income was $46,714 and the median family income was $58,814. Males had a median income of $40,872 versus $33,278 for females. The county's per capita income was $27,247. About 6.3% of families and 11.1% of the population were below the poverty line, including 13.3% of those under age 18 and 7.7% of those age 65 or over.

=== 2000 census ===
As of the census of 2000, 44,216 people, 18,375 households, and 11,447 families resided in the county. The population density was 56 people per square mile (22 people/km^{2}). There were 27,039 housing units at an average density of 34 units per square mile (13 units/km^{2}). The county's racial makeup was 96.72% White, 0.50% Black or African American, 0.22% Native American, 0.79% Asian, 0.04% Pacific Islander, 0.32% from other races, and 1.42% from two or more races. 1.11% of the population were Hispanic or Latino of any race. 18.1% were of English, 13.3% Irish, 9.5% French, 8.9% American, 7.7% German, 6.0% Italian and 5.0% French Canadian ancestry. 95.9% spoke English, 1.3% Spanish and 1.2% French as their first language.

There were 18,375 households, of which 29.90% had children under the age of 18 living with them, 49.20% were married couples living together, 9.60% had a female householder with no husband present, and 37.70% were non-families. 29.70% of all households were made up of individuals, and 10.20% had someone living alone who was 65 years of age or older. The average household size was 2.35 and the average family size was 2.91.

In the county, the population was spread out, with 23.50% under the age of 18, 7.10% from 18 to 24, 28.10% from 25 to 44, 27.20% from 45 to 64, and 14.00% who were 65 years of age or older. The median age was 40 years. For every 100 females there were 95.00 males. For every 100 females age 18 and over, there were 91.80 males.

The county's median household income was $38,204, and the median family income was $46,989. Males had a median income of $31,094 versus $24,650 for females. The county's per capita income was $20,533. About 6.10% of families and 9.40% of the population were below the poverty line, including 12.00% of those under age 18 and 7.90% of those age 65 or over.

== Politics and government ==
In 1828, Windham County was won by National Republican Party candidate John Quincy Adams and by Henry Clay in 1832.

From William Henry Harrison in 1836 to Winfield Scott in 1852, the county would vote the Whig Party candidates.

From John C. Frémont in 1856 to Richard Nixon in 1960, the Republican Party would have a 104-year winning streak within Windham County.

In 1964, the county was won by Democratic Party incumbent President Lyndon B. Johnson, who became not only the first Democratic presidential candidate to win the county, but to win the state of Vermont entirely.

Following the Democrats victory in 1964, the county went back to voting for Republican candidates for another 16 year winning streak starting with Richard Nixon in 1968 and ending with Ronald Reagan in 1984, who became the last Republican presidential candidate to win the county, winning it with 54% of the vote to 45% for Walter Mondale.

In 1988 the county was won by Michael Dukakis and has been won by Democratic candidates ever since.

Windham County was Vermont's bluest county in the 2000, 2004, 2008 and 2012 U.S. presidential elections. Then-Vice President Al Gore won the county by an 18.4% margin over then-Texas Governor George W. Bush, with 53% of the vote to Bush's 34%. In 2004, John Kerry carried the county by a 35.2% margin over President Bush, with Kerry carrying the state by 20.1% over Bush. In 2008, Barack Obama won Windham by 48.1% margin over John McCain, with Obama winning by 37% over McCain statewide. In 2012, Obama won Windham County by a 48.7% margin over Mitt Romney.

In 2006, four towns in Windham County, Dummerston, Marlboro, Newfane, and Stratton, had their citizens pass resolutions supporting the proposed impeachment of President George W. Bush.

United States presidential election results for Windham County, Vermont
Year	Republican		Democratic		Third party(ies)	
Year	No.	%	No.	%	No.	%
1880	4,637	76.37%	1,426	23.48%	9	0.15%
1884	3,788	67.13%	1,703	30.18%	152	2.69%
1888	4,344	69.75%	1,518	24.37%	366	5.88%
1892	3,656	69.52%	1,496	28.45%	107	2.03%
1896	4,829	84.14%	670	11.67%	240	4.18%
1900	3,948	79.02%	1,014	20.30%	34	0.68%
1904	3,735	78.60%	809	17.02%	208	4.38%
1908	3,738	78.56%	906	19.04%	114	2.40%
1912	2,143	38.25%	1,327	23.69%	2,132	38.06%
1916	3,375	65.50%	1,698	32.95%	80	1.55%
1920	5,551	80.36%	1,302	18.85%	55	0.80%
1924	7,638	83.18%	1,091	11.88%	454	4.94%
1928	8,410	77.70%	2,398	22.15%	16	0.15%
1932	7,347	66.02%	3,659	32.88%	123	1.11%
1936	7,369	66.42%	3,699	33.34%	27	0.24%
1940	7,031	63.01%	4,101	36.75%	27	0.24%
1944	6,708	66.49%	3,376	33.46%	5	0.05%
1948	7,148	70.49%	2,770	27.32%	222	2.19%
1952	9,774	77.60%	2,790	22.15%	31	0.25%
1956	9,979	79.99%	2,474	19.83%	22	0.18%
1960	9,128	67.69%	4,358	32.31%	0	0.00%
1964	4,180	33.29%	8,371	66.67%	4	0.03%
1968	6,916	54.37%	5,353	42.08%	452	3.55%
1972	9,062	60.01%	5,925	39.24%	113	0.75%
1976	7,928	52.05%	6,794	44.60%	510	3.35%
1980	7,062	42.55%	5,830	35.12%	3,706	22.33%
1984	9,880	54.05%	8,206	44.89%	193	1.06%
1988	8,572	45.96%	9,839	52.75%	242	1.30%
1992	5,816	27.16%	11,414	53.31%	4,181	19.53%
1996	5,261	27.81%	10,426	55.12%	3,228	17.07%
2000	7,358	34.24%	11,319	52.67%	2,814	13.09%
2004	7,280	31.22%	15,489	66.43%	547	2.35%
2008	5,997	24.90%	17,585	73.02%	499	2.07%
2012	5,347	24.37%	16,026	73.05%	564	2.57%
2016	5,454	24.10%	14,340	63.36%	2,840	12.55%
2020	6,440	24.74%	18,767	72.08%	828	3.18%
2024	6,928	26.71%	17,904	69.04%	1,101	4.25%

== Law enforcement ==
The Windham County Sheriff's Department is one source of law enforcement in the county, especially in areas with no local police departments. Where no coverage exists, the Vermont State Police are the de facto law enforcement agency. The following towns maintain a contract with the Windham County Sheriff's Department for patrol services: Athens, Dummerston, Grafton, Halifax, Jamaica, Londonderry, Marlboro, Newfane, Putney, Rockingham, Vernon, Westminster, and Windham. The current Sheriff is Mark Anderson, who was appointed in 2019 after Sheriff Keith Clark retired midway through his term.

In 2006, Sheriff Sheila Prue pled guilty to stealing department funds, using department equipment for personal use and for mismanagement of the department.

== Transportation ==
=== Roads and highways ===
Windham County is crossed by:

- Interstate 91 (six interchanges within the county)
- U.S. Route 5
- Vermont Route 8A
- Vermont Route 9
- Vermont Route 11
- Vermont Route 30
- Vermont Route 35
- Vermont Route 100
- Vermont Route 103
- Vermont Route 112
- Vermont Route 119
- Vermont Route 121
- Vermont Route 123
- Vermont Route 142

=== Bus ===
Local bus service, particularly in and around Brattleboro and Bellows Falls, is provided by Connecticut River Transit's "The Current". The Current includes the entire Brattleboro BeeLine bus system, composed of the Red, Blue and White Lines, which also go to West Brattleboro and Hinsdale, New Hampshire. The Deerfield Valley Transit Association's fare-free MOOver serves mostly the southwestern portion of the county, especially the town of Wilmington and nearby ski areas. The MOOver also has bus connections to Bennington (in a partnership with the Green Mountain Express) to the west and Brattleboro, connecting to other local and intercity buses in both towns.

The national intercity bus service Greyhound serves Windham County with stops in Brattleboro and Bellows Falls daily.

=== Rail ===
Amtrak, the national intercity rail network, operates its Vermonter, running daily from St. Albans, Vermont to Washington, DC through Bellows Falls and Brattleboro with one daily northbound and southbound stop in both stations in the county.

== Communities ==
=== Towns ===
In Vermont, towns are contiguous named places, subdivisions of counties, where there is permanent, year-round human population. They are usually formally incorporated, governing themselves in open town meetings (with very few exceptions), and their usual elected administrative body is called a selectboard. Though Brattleboro is by far the most populous town in the county, the historic "shire town" (county seat) is Newfane, and Windham County Superior Court is still there, as are the offices of the County Sheriff and the County Clerk.

- Athens
- Brattleboro
- Brookline
- Dover
- Dummerston
- Grafton
- Guilford
- Halifax
- Jamaica
- Londonderry
- Marlboro
- Newfane (shire town)
- Putney
- Rockingham
- Somerset
- Stratton
- Townshend
- Vernon
- Wardsboro
- Westminster
- Whitingham
- Wilmington
- Windham

=== Villages ===
Villages are named places and sometimes formal census divisions, but may or may not be incorporated separately within a town's borders.

==== Incorporated villages ====
- Bellows Falls
- Jacksonville
- Newfane
- Saxtons River
- Westminster

==== Census-designated places ====
- Algiers
- Brattleboro
- Chimney Hill
- Grafton
- Harmonyville
- Jamaica
- Londonderry
- North Westminster
- Putney
- South Londonderry
- Stratton Mountain (also in Winhall in Bennington County)
- Townshend
- Wardsboro
- West Brattleboro
- West Dummerston
- Whitingham
- Wilmington

==== Unincorporated villages ====
- Cambridgeport
- Dover
- Dummerston Center
- East Dover
- East Dummerston
- East Jamaica
- Halifax Center
- Houghtonville
- Rawsonville
- South Newfane
- South Wardsboro
- South Windham
- Wardsboro Center
- West Dover
- West Halifax
- West Townshend
- West Wardsboro
- Westminster Station
- Westminster West
- Williamsville

== See also ==
- List of counties in Vermont
- List of towns in Vermont
- National Register of Historic Places listings in Windham County, Vermont
- Historical Society of Windham County
