= Rock River (West River tributary) =

River in the U.S. state of Vermont

Coordinates: 42.94730°N 72.64204°W

The Rock River is a 12.9-mile-long (20.8 km) tributary of the West River in southern Vermont in the United States. Via the West River, it is part of the watershed of the Connecticut River.

The Rock River flows for its entire length in Windham County. It rises in the Green Mountain National Forest in the town of Dover and flows generally eastwardly into the town of Newfane, where it joins the West River.

== See also ==
- List of Vermont rivers
