= Rice (surname) =

Rice is a surname that is frequently of Welsh origin, but also can be English, Irish, or even German. In Wales it is a patronymic surname, an Anglicized transliteration of Rhys, as are Reese and Reece. The German name Reiss has also been transliterated as Rice in the United States.

== A ==
- Abbott Barnes Rice (1862–1926), American businessman, Massachusetts State legislator
- Albert E. Rice (1845–1921), American politician, Lt. Governor of Minnesota
- Alex Rice (born 1972), Canadian First Nations (Mohawk) actress
- Alexander H. Rice (1818–1895), American politician, Governor of Massachusetts
- Alexander H. Rice (explorer) (1875–1956), American physician, geographer, explorer
- Alice Hegan Rice (1870–1942), American novelist
- Alice May Bates Rice (1868–after 1907), American soprano singer
- Americus Vespucius Rice (1835–1904), American Civil War general (Union) and U.S. Congressman
- Amy Rice (born 1966), American attorney, former Democratic member of the Rhode Island House of Representatives
- Andrew Rice (born 1973), American civic leader and politician, Oklahoma State senator
- Andrew E. Rice (1922–2010), American academic, founder of Peace Corps and Society for International Development
- Angourie Rice (born 2001), Australian actress
- Anna Rice (born 1980), Canadian badminton player
- Anne Rice (1941–2021), American author
- Anneka Rice (born 1958), British television presenter
- Arthur Rice, 6th Baron Dynevor (1836–1911), British peer
- Ashley Rice (born 1986), English actor

== B ==
- Ben Rice (born 1999), American baseball player
- Benjamin F. Rice (1828–1905), U.S. Republican Senator from Arkansas
- Benjamin L. Rice (1837–1927), epigraphist in India
- Boyd Rice (born 1956), U.S. experimental sound/noise musician, also known as NON
- Brendan Patrick Rice (born 1997), stage name Gus Dapperton, American singer-songwriter
- Brenden Rice (born 2002), American football player
- Brett Rice (born 1954), American actor
- Britton Rice (born 1981), American musician and record producer
- Bryan Rice (born 1978), Danish singer also known as Brian Risberg Clausen
- Buddy Rice (born 1976), U.S. auto racing driver

== C ==
- Cale Young Rice (1872–1943), U.S. poet and dramatist
- Caleb Rice (1792–1873), attorney and politician who was first president of the Massachusetts Mutual Life Insurance Company
- Cecil Spring Rice (1872–1943), British diplomat
- C. Allen Thorndike Rice (1851–1889), publisher, editor and journalist
- Charles E. Rice (1931–2015), U.S. legal scholar, Catholic apologist, and author
- Charles Owen Rice (1908–2005), U.S. labor activist, Roman Catholic priest
- Chester Williams Rice (1888–1951), U.S. inventor
- Chris Rice, U.S. singer and songwriter of contemporary and Christian music
- Christopher Rice (born 1978), U.S. novelist, son of Anne Rice
- Clive Rice (1949–2015), South African cricketer
- Condoleezza Rice (born 1954), U.S. academic and public official, former Secretary of State
- Constance L. Rice (born 1956), U.S. civil rights activist
- Craig L. Rice, (born 1972), U.S. politician from Maryland
- Craig Rice (author) (1908–1957), U.S. author of mysteries

== D ==
- Damien Rice (born 1973), Irish musician
- Dan Rice (1823–1900), U.S. entertainer, primarily a clown
- Danica Rice, Canadian sprint kayaker
- David Rice (disambiguation), multiple people
- Dean Rice (born 1968), Australian rules footballer
- Declan Rice (born 1999), English footballer
- Del Rice (1922–1983), U.S. baseball player and team manager, American League
- Desmond Rice (1924–2020), British Army officer
- Donna Rice (born 1958), figure in U.S. political sex scandal, anti-pornography crusader
- Dorothy P. Rice (1922–2017), U.S. public health statistician

== E ==
- Ed Rice (1918–2001), U.S. author, publisher, photojournalist and painter
- Edmund Rice (colonist) (1594–1663), early Massachusetts Bay settler who has many descendants in the northern U.S.A.
- Edmund Rice (general) (1842–1906), brigadier general, American Civil War Medal of Honor recipient
- Edmund Rice (politician) (1819–1889), U.S. Congressman from Minnesota
- Edmund Ignatius Rice (1762–1844), Irish Roman Catholic missionary, founder of Christian Brothers and Presentation Brothers
- Edward A. Rice Jr. (born 1956), U.S. Air Force Lt. General
- Edward E. Rice (1847–1924), writer in U.S. theater
- Edward Loranus Rice (1871–1960), U.S. biologist and educator
- Edward Y. Rice (1820–1883), U.S. representative from Illinois
- Elizabeth Rice (born 1985), U.S. actress
- Elliott Warren Rice (1835–1887), U.S. Civil War general (Union)
- Elmer Rice (1892–1967), U.S. Pulitzer Prize-winning playwright
- Eugene Rice (1891–1967), U.S. federal judge
- Eugene F. Rice Jr. (1924–2008), U.S. historian

== F ==
- Florence Rice (1911–1974), U.S. film actress of the 1930s and early 1940s
- Florence M. Rice (1919–2020), New York City consumer advocate
- Francis Rice, 5th Baron Dynevor (1804–1878), British clergyman and peer
- Franklin Pierce Rice (1852–1919), U.S. publisher, historian and antiquarian

== G ==
- Gary Rice (born 1960), British cricketer
- George Rice, 3rd Baron Dynevor (1765–1852), British peer and politician
- George Rice-Trevor, 4th Baron Dynevor (1795–1869), British politician
- George W. Rice (businessman) (1823–1856), U.S. businessman known for founding the Massachusetts Mutual Life Insurance Company
- George W. Rice (photographer), (1855–1884) Canadian photographer and Arctic explorer
- Gigi Rice (born 1965), U.S. movie and television actress
- Glen Rice (born 1967), U.S. professional basketball player
- Glen Rice Jr. (born 1991), U.S. and international professional basketball player
- Gordon Rice (born 1933), Canadian artist
- Grantland Rice (1880–1954), U.S. sportswriter

== H ==
- Harvey Rice, (1800–1891) lawyer, publisher, author and Ohio state legislator
- Helen Steiner Rice (1900–1981), U.S. writer of religious poetry
- Henry Rice (politician), (1786–1867) U.S. military officer, merchant and Massachusetts state legislator
- Henry Gordon Rice (1920–2003), U.S. logician known for Rice's theorem
- Henry Mower Rice (1816–1894), U.S. Senator from Minnesota
- Homer Rice (born 1927), American football coach
- Horace Rice (1872–1950), Australian tennis player
- Howard Rice, U.S. sailor

== I ==
- Iain Rice (1947–2022), writer on model railways
- Ignatius Rice (1883–1955), British Benedictine monk, headmaster of Douai School
- Ira A. Rice (1812–1887), Wisconsin pioneer and politician
- Isaac Rice (disambiguation), multiple people
- Isabella Rice (born 2006), American television actress

== J ==
- J Rice (born 1988), American singer-songwriter
- Jackie Rice (born 1990), Filipina actress and model
- Jacob Rice (New Hampshire politician) (1787–1879), New Hampshire politician
- Jacob Rice (New York politician) (1847–1930), New York politician
- James Rice (cricketer), English amateur cricketer from 1811 to 1813
- James Rice (writer) (1843–1882), English novelist
- James A. Rice (born 1957), U.S. politician and jurist
- James Clay Rice (1828–1864), U.S. Civil War general (Union)
- James Louis Rice (1730–1793), Irish count of The Holy Roman Empire
- James Mahmud Rice (born 1972), Australian sociologist
- James Montgomery Rice (1842–1912), American lawyer and politician
- James R. Rice, (born 1940), U.S. scholar in the field of solid mechanics
- James S. Rice, (1846–1939), U.S. rancher and businessman
- Jerry Rice (born 1962), American football player
- Jerry Rice Jr. (born 1991), American football player
- Jim Rice (born 1953), U.S. baseball player
- Joan Rice (1930–1997), British movie actress
- Joel Ryce-Menuhin (1933–1998), or Joel Taylor Rice, U.S. pianist and Jungian psychologist
- John Rice (disambiguation), multiple people
- Johnathan Rice (born 1983), U.S. musician
- Jonas Rice (1672–1753), founder of Worcester, Massachusetts
- Joseph Waldo Rice (1828–1915), American-born entrepreneur and Australia pioneer
- Juanita Rice (née Anita Rice, also known as Juanita Guccione; 1904–1999), American painter and taxidermist

== K ==
- Kathleen M. Rice (born 1965), U.S. Congresswoman representing New York's 4th congressional district
- Kiki Rice (born 2004), American basketball player

== L ==
- L. Scott Rice (born 1958), U.S. Air Force major general
- Laban Lacy Rice (1870–1973), U.S. educator
- Landon Rice (born 1988), Canadian football player
- Larry Rice (racing driver) (1946–2009), U.S. racing car driver
- Larry Rice, U.S. politician
- Len Rice (1918–1992), U.S. baseball player
- Lilian Jeannette Rice (1889–1938), American architect
- Linda L. Rice (born 1964), American racehorse trainer
- Lucy Wilson Rice (1874–1963), American artist based in Texas
- Luther Rice (1783–1836), U.S. minister and missionary

== M ==
- Mary Berenice Rice (1902-1991), Catholic nun and psychologist
- Mack Rice (1933–2016), U.S. songwriter
- Mandy Rice-Davies (1944–2014), British model involved in the Profumo affair
- Marjorie Rice (1923–2017), U.S. amateur mathematician
- Matthew Rice (born 1982), American football player
- Mattie Clyburn Rice (1922–2014), African American member of the United Daughters of the Confederacy
- Michael Rice (disambiguation) or Mike Rice, multiple people
- Milton P. Rice (1920–2018), American lawyer
- Miriam C. Rice (1918–2010), American artist
- M. J. Rice (born 2003), American basketball player
- Monty Rice (born 1999), American football player
- Myles Rice (born 2002), American basketball player

== N ==
- Nathaniel Rice (c. 1694–1753), colonial governor of North Carolina
- Norm Rice (born 1943), former mayor of Seattle, Washington

== P ==
- Pat Rice (born 1949), Northern Irish footballer and coach
- Paul Rice (born 1949), Australian District Court Judge
- Paul North Rice (1888–1967), American librarian
- Percy Fitch Rice, (1882–1954) inventor and businessman
- Peter Rice (disambiguation), multiple people

== R ==
- Rachel Rice (born 1984), Welsh actress and model
- Rashee Rice (born 2000), American football player and wide receiver for the Kansas City Chiefs
- Ray Rice (born 1987), American football player
- Reginald Rice (1868–1928), English cricketer (Gloucestershire, Bedfordshire, Gentleman), English teacher
- Rice Brothers John and Greg (born 1951), U.S. identical twin dwarfs, actors in commercials
- Richard Rice (disambiguation), multiple people
- Robert V. Rice (1924–2020), U.S. biochemist
- Ronald Rice (disambiguation), multiple people

== S ==
- Sam Rice (Edgar Charles "Sam" Rice), (1890–1974) U.S. baseball player
- Samuel Allen Rice (1828–1864), U.S. Civil War general (Union)
- Santino Rice (born 1974), U.S. fashion designer
- Sarah Rice (1955–2024), U.S. stage actress
- Sarah Rice (banker) (died 1842), English businesswoman
- Sidney Rice (born 1986), American football player
- Simeon Rice (born 1974), American football player
- Sir'Jabari Rice (born 1998), American basketball player
- Spencer Rice (born 1973), Canadian writer and comedian
- Stan Rice (1942–2002), U.S. poet and artist, husband of Anne Rice
- Stephanie Rice (born 1988), Australian swimmer
- Steven Rice (born 1971), 1990s National Hockey League player from Canada
- Stuart A. Rice (1932–2024), U.S. theoretical and physical chemist
- Stuart A. Rice (statistician) (1889–1969), American statistician and sociologist
- Susan Rice (born 1964), U.S. foreign policy advisor and ambassador to the United Nations
- Suzy Rice, U.S. screenwriter and graphic artist

== T ==
- Terry Rice (born 1954), member of the Arkansas House of Representatives
- Thomas Rice (disambiguation), multiple people
- Tim Rice (born 1944), British lyricist, worked with Andrew Lloyd Webber
- Tim Rice-Oxley (born 1976), English musician, co-founder of Keane
- Tom Rice (born 1957), U.S. Congressman (South Carolina's 7th congressional district, Republican Party)
- Tony Rice (1951–2020), U.S. bluegrass musician
- Tony Rice (gridiron football) (born 1967), American football player
- Travis Rice (born 1982), U.S. professional snowboarder

== V ==
- Victor M. Rice (1818–1869), New York politician

== W ==
- W. Thomas Rice (1912–2006), American railroad executive
- Wallace Rice (1859–1939), U.S. author, lecturer, and poet
- Walter Rice, 7th Baron Dynevor (1873–1956), British military officer and politician
- Willard Rice (1895–1967), American silver medalist in 1924 Winter Olympics
- William B. Rice (1840–1909), American industrialist and corporate executive
- William "Bill" Rice (1931–2006), American artist, writer, actor, and director
- William Craig Rice (1955–2016), American pedagogy expert
- William Hyde Rice (1846–1924), sugar plantation owner and politician from Kauaʻi, Hawaii
- William Marsh Rice (1816–1900), American businessman, founder of Rice University
- William North Rice (1845–1928), American geologist
- William W. Rice (1826–1896), U.S. Representative from Massachusetts

== Fictional characters ==
- Chlöe Rice, a character in the Netflix series 13 Reasons Why
- Todd Rice, a superhero named Obsidian from DC Comics

== See also ==
- Justice Rice (disambiguation)
