= Caroline Laura Rice =

American social reformer

Caroline Laura Rice, née North (June 20, 1819 – August 29, 1899) was an American teacher, writer, composer, and social reformer.

== Biography ==
She was born June 20, 1819, in Torrington, Connecticut, the daughter of William North and Laura Hyde North. Her parents moved to Great Falls, New Hampshire, and then to Lowell, Massachusetts, during her childhood. Her father was superintendent of the dyeing department at Middlesex Mills and a founder of St. Paul's Methodist Episcopal Church in Lowell. She attended Wilbraham Wesleyan Academy.

She taught in the public schools of Lowell. She was president of the Soldiers Aid Association during the Civil War, and the second president of the Springfield Home for Friendless Women and Children in the 1870s. She was also active in the women's club. Her interests there included temperance reform.

She was an avid writer. She wrote at least two hymns, "I builded Rock, on the Rock of God," and "Wilt thou hear the voice of praise." "Wilt thou hear the voice of praise," was included in the Methodist hymnal.

In 1887, she attended a lecture given by Pandita Ramabai.

She donated a book from the Massachusetts Female Emancipation Society to Wesleyan University.

She was very active in the Trinity Methodist Church in Springfield, Massachusetts.

She married Rev. William Rice (1821–1897) on September 13, 1843. They had four children: William North Rice, Edward Hyde Rice, Charles Francis Rice, and Caroline Laura Rice.

She died August 29, 1899, in the home of her son, Rev. Dr. Charles Francis Rice in Springfield.
