= William Rice (librarian) =

American Methodist Episcopal minister, author, and librarian (1821–1897)

- Born: March 10, 1821; Springfield, Massachusetts
- Died: August 17, 1897 (aged 76); Springfield, Massachusetts
- Education: Wesleyan University
- Occupations: Minister, librarian
- Spouse: Caroline Laura North (m. 1843)
- Children: William North Rice (b. 1845); Edward Hyde Rice (b. 1847); Charles Francis Rice (b. 1851); Caroline Laura Rice (b. 1856)
- Parent(s): William Rice and Jerusha Warriner

William Rice (1821–1897) was a Methodist Episcopal minister, author, and from 1861 to his death in 1897, the President and Executive Director of the Springfield City Library Association. He was an important public figure in nineteenth-century Springfield, Massachusetts.

== Early life and education ==
William Rice, circa 1840-1850

He was born March 10, 1821, in Springfield, Massachusetts, to William Rice and Jerusha Warriner. William Rice Sr. was a respected businessman and public servant who began a long tradition of Methodism in the Rice family. He was a descendant of Edmund Rice, an early settler in Massachusetts. Jerusha Warriner was the daughter of David Warriner and was descended from William Warriner, a founder of Springfield.

William Rice II studied in the Springfield public schools and at Wilbraham Wesleyan Academy, graduating in 1840. He was a vocal abolitionist beginning early in his life. He had organized an Anti-Slavery Society while a student at Wesleyan Academy, and had been disciplined. He received a Master of Arts from Wesleyan University in 1853, and was elected an honorary member of the Eclectic Society in 1857. He was awarded a Doctor of Divinity degree in 1876.

== Ministry ==
He was ordained in the New England Conference of the Methodist Episcopal Church in 1841, and served churches for the next sixteen years.

He served as pastor at the following churches;

- Methodist Episcopal Church, Melrose, Massachusetts (1842)
- Methodist Episcopal Church, Saugus, Massachusetts (1843-1844)
- Methodist Episcopal Church, Marblehead, Massachusetts (1845)
- North Russell Street Church (later Grace Church), Boston, Massachusetts (1848-1849)
- South Street Methodist Church, Lynn, Massachusetts
- Park Street (later Walnut Street Church), Chelsea, Massachusetts (1851)
- Methodist Episcopal Church,Chicopee, Massachusetts (1852-1854)
- Bromfield Street Church, Boston, Massachusetts (1854-1855)
- Park Street (later Walnut Street Church), Chelsea, Massachusetts (1856)

While pastor at the Methodist Episcopal Church in Melrose, the church was enlarged and rededicated.

In 1848, he spoke on "The Effects of Liquor Traffic" at the North Bennet Street Church.

In 1850, he preached the annual sermon at the Annual Conference of the Methodist Episcopal Church at North Russell Street Church, with Bishop Thomas Asbury Morris presiding.

In 1856, he was a delegate to the General Conference of the church, representing the antislavery sentiment of the New England Conference. He was also a delegate in 1876, and was the editor of the Methodist Hymnal, published in that year.

He published two books, mainly for ministers: Moral and Religious Quotations from the Poets (Methodist Book Concern, 1860) and Pastor's Manual (Roderick Burt, Springfield, 1863). The Reverend Rice began to suffer from chronic laryngitis, which made preaching every week very difficult, and he returned to Springfield in 1857.

In 1879, he gave an address at the reopened Methodist Church in Saugus, "The Church in Saugus Previous to 1854," as he had been minister there in 1843.

In 1880, he returned to the Bromfield Street Church, where he was minister 1854-55 to give a benediction at a special service.

He served as chaplain in the Hampden County House of Correction from 1873 to 1882. In 1888, he read scripture at an anniversary celebration for the American Sunday School Union in Springfield. He was also president of the Methodist Union of the Connecticut Valley.

In 1895, he gave a prayer and read a paper on Jewish literature at a meeting of the Connecticut River Valley Theological Club at the Massasoit House in Springfield.

== City Library Association ==
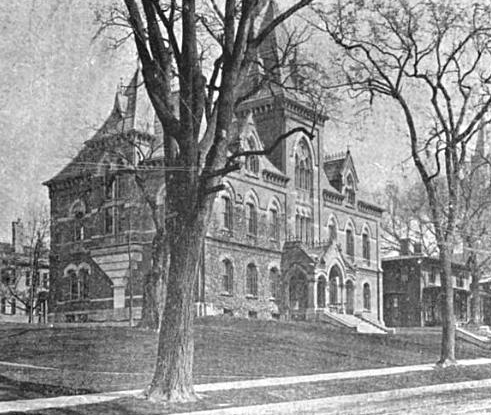
The Library, 1891

In 1861, he became librarian of the Springfield City Library. The library was very small at first, but grew tremendously under Rice's care.

In 1871, the library moved to a new building named the William Rice Building. It became a free public library in 1885. When he died in 1897, the library had more than 99,000 volumes.

Rice was involved in the development of the Springfield Museums on the Quadrangle, which today have a "Society of William Rice," honoring major gifts.

Rice was a member of the American Historical Association, and he cultivated the museums surrounding the library to educate the public. As part of these efforts, he served as vice president of the Connecticut Valley Historical Society. He was one of the early members of the Massachusetts Library Club

In 1887, he attended the meeting of the American Library Association in Round Lake, New York.

== Educational interests ==
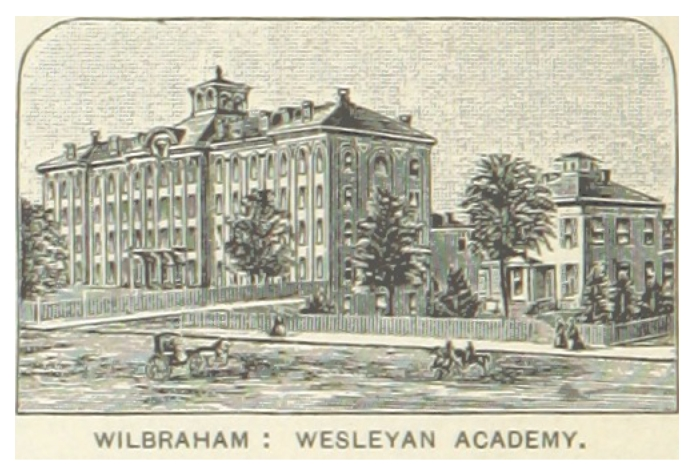
Wilbraham Wesleyan Academy, 1891

He was very passionate about education. In 1863, he was appointed a member of the Massachusetts Board of Education, which he remained for eighteen years.

He worked especially hard on the Westfield Normal School. As chairman of the Board of Visitors, he presided over the graduation exercises in 1875. He also served on the Springfield School Committee from 1865-1882. He was a trustee of Wesleyan University from 1875 to his death. In 1886, he attended a board of trustees meeting in New York.

He was a member of the board of Wilbraham Wesleyan Academy beginning in 1858, served as secretary from 1860 to 1882, and president of the board from 1882 to his death in 1897. He was succeeded in this role by his son, Charles Francis Rice. In 1887, he accompanied former Massachusetts Governor George D. Robinson at the commencement exercises, where he gave a speech.

== Family life ==
He married Caroline Laura North (1819–1899), daughter of William North of Lowell on September 13, 1843. She had also studied at the Wilbraham Wesleyan Academy. She was the second president of the Springfield Home for Friendless Women and Children in the 1870s. She authored hymns including "I builded Rock, on the Rock of God", and "Wilt thou hear the voice of praise."

William and Caroline Rice's children were William North Rice, Edward Hyde Rice, Charles Francis Rice, and Caroline Laura Rice. All four children attended Wesleyan University and attained post-graduate degrees. William North and Charles Francis became ministers, and both earned doctorates. Edward Hyde earned a doctorate degree, and was a principle of multiple high schools before an early death in 1895. Caroline Laura earned a master's degree from Wesleyan. William North Rice and Charles Francis Rice co-wrote William Rice, A Memorial in 1897. Grandchildren included Edward Loranus Rice, William Chauncey Rice, Horace Jacobs Rice, and Paul North Rice, who also became a librarian.

William Rice was first cousins with George Washington Rice, the founder of the Massachusetts Mutual Life Insurance Company and the Springfield Five Cent Savings Bank, for which William Rice served as the president.

William Rice died from dysentery in Springfield on August 17, 1897. His funeral and memorial services were held at Trinity Methodist Episcopal Church in Springfield, where the family had a long association. He is buried in his family plot in the Springfield Cemetery.

== Genealogy ==
William Rice was a direct descendant of Edmund Rice, an English immigrant to Massachusetts Bay Colony, as follows:

- William Rice, son of

- William Rice (1788–1863), son of
- Nathan Rice (1760–1838), son of
- John Rice (1704–1771), son of

- Ephraim Rice (1665–1732), son of
- Thomas Rice (1625–1681), son of

- Edmund Rice (1594–1663)
