= Edward Rice =

Edward Rice may refer to:

- Ed Rice (1918–2001), American author, publisher, photojournalist and painter
- Edward A. Rice Jr. (born 1955), United States Air Force officer
- Edward E. Rice (1847–1924), writer in American theater
- Edward Loranus Rice (1871–1960), American biologist
- Edward M. Rice (born 1960), American Catholic bishop
- Edward Royd Rice (1790–1878), British MP for Dover, 1837–1857
- Edward Y. Rice (1820–1883), U.S. representative from Illinois
- Edward Rice (Royal Navy officer) (1819–1902), British admiral
- Edward Rice (priest) (1779–1862), Dean of Gloucester
- Edward Hyde Rice (1847–1895), American academic
- Edward Le Roy Rice (1871–1938), American producer of minstrel shows
