= Edmund Rice =

Edmund Rice may refer to:

- Edmund Ignatius Rice (1762–1844), Catholic lay brother and founder of the Christian Brothers and Presentation Brothers
- Edmund Rice (colonist) (1594–1663), English immigrant to the Massachusetts Bay Colony
- Edmund Rice (politician) (1819–1889), U.S. Representative from Minnesota
- Edmund Rice (Medal of Honor) (1842–1906), brigadier general, American Civil War Medal of Honor recipient, inventor of the Rice trowel bayonet

== See also ==
- Edmund Rice Centre, an Australian human rights advocacy organisation
- Edward Rice (disambiguation)
