= David Rice =

David Rice may refer to:

- Dave Rice (American football) (born c. 1940), former American college football coach
- Dave Rice (basketball) (born 1968), American college basketball coach
- David "King" Rice (born 1968), American basketball coach and former player
- David Rice (bishop), 15th Anglican Bishop of Waiapu
- David Rice (convict) (1947–2016), American convicted of murdering an Omaha, Nebraska police officer in the Rice/Poindexter case
- David Rice (Presbyterian minister) (1733–1816), antebellum Presbyterian minister and antislavery advocate
- David Rice (psychiatrist) (1914–1997), English psychiatrist, naval officer and first-class cricketer
- David Rice (tennis) (born 1989), British tennis player
- David Lewis Rice (born 1958), American, murderer of civil rights attorney Charles Goldmark and his family; convicted and sentenced to death
- David Talbot Rice (1903–1972), British art historian
- David Rice Atchison (1807-1886), United States senator of Missouri
- David Anthony Rice (1951-2020), American guitarist and singer
- David Leo Rice (born 1987), American, novelist and short story writer known for his surreal and darkly comic fiction
