= Mary Rice =

Mary Rice may refer to:

- Mary Sophia Hyde Rice (1816–1911), American missionary
- Mary Livermore (1820–1905), née Mary Rice, American journalist
- Mary Spring Rice (1880–1924), Irish nationalist activist
- Mary Blair Rice (1880–1959), better known as American writer Blair Niles
- Mary Berenice Rice (1902-1991), Catholic nun and psychologist
- Mary E. Rice (born 1926), American invertebrate zoologist
- Mary Rice Hopkins (active 1990–2010), American Christian musician
- Mary Rice (wheelchair racer) (active 1996–2000), Irish paralympic athlete
- Mary Rice, a character in 2008 film Jumper
