= Thomas Spring =

Thomas Spring may refer to:

- Thomas Spring of Lavenham (c. 1474–1523), English merchant
- Thomas Spring of Castlemaine (died 1597), English soldier
- Sir Thomas Spring, 3rd Baronet (c. 1672–1704), English baronet
- Tom Spring (1795–1851), bare-knuckle fighter
- Tom Spring (rugby union) (born 2002), French international rugby union player
- Thomas J. Spring (1904–?), American judge

== See also ==
- Thomas Spring Rice (disambiguation)
