= Edward Loranus Rice =

- Born: March 18, 1871; Middletown, Connecticut
- Died: February 4, 1960 (aged 88); Delaware, Ohio, United States
- Education: Wesleyan University, Ludwig-Maximilians-Universität München
- Known for: Debate on evolution with William Jennings Bryan; scientific consultant to Clarence Darrow before the Scopes trial
- Spouse: Sarah Langton Abbott (m. 1901)
- Children: Charlotte Rice Roden (1904-1990); William Abbott Rice (1912-1991)
- Awards: AAAS Fellow

Edward Loranus Rice (1871-1960) was a biologist and educator who served as the acting president of Ohio Wesleyan University. He was best known for his 1924 debate with William Jennings Bryan on the topic of biological evolution and serving as a scientific consultant to Clarence Darrow before the 1925 Scopes trial.

== Early life and education ==
Edward Loranus Rice was born in Middletown, Connecticut, March 18, 1871, to William North Rice and Elizabeth Wing (Crowell) Rice. He received his A.B. degree from Wesleyan University in Middletown, Connecticut, in 1892. He earned two doctoral degrees, including a Ph.D. in zoology in 1895 at the Ludwig-Maximilians-Universität München, and a Sc.D. in 1927 from Wesleyan University.

== Academic career ==
Rice began his 50 consecutive years of teaching as assistant professor at Wesleyan University in 1896. He soon became a professor of biology and geology at Allegheny College 1896-98 before becoming a professor of biology at Ohio Wesleyan University in 1898 and serving until his retirement in 1941. He served as acting president of Ohio Wesleyan University from 1938 to 1939. After his retirement he returned to teaching as a war emergency professor at Ohio Wesleyan from 1942 to 1945. He was visiting professor at Ohio State University Lake Laboratory on Lake Erie at Cedar Point, Sandusky Bay during the summers of 1905, 1906, 1908, 1909, and 1912.

Rice was honored with membership in Phi Beta Kappa society, Sigma Xi, and the Eclectic Society. He elected a fellow of American Association for the Advancement of Science (AAAS) of which he was vice president and chairman of the Biological Sciences Section in 1903. He held memberships in American Society of Naturalists, American Genetic Association, American Association of Anatomists, and American Society of Zoologists. He was a fellow in the Zoology Section, and president of the Ohio Academy of Sciences from 1906 to 1907, and served as secretary from 1912 to 1923.

Like his father William North Rice, Rice was most noted for his work to reconcile scientific observations with religious faith. At the 1924 meeting of the AAAS, he debated William Jennings Bryan on biological evolution and was a scientific consultant for Clarence Darrow before the 1925 Scopes trial. He is also well known for authoring a textbook, An Introduction to Biology in 1935, and he contributed numerous papers to scientific journals.

== Selected publications ==
- Rice, E.L. (1908). "Gill development in Mytilus". The Biological Bulletin. 14 (2): 61–77.
- ———— (1916). "The quarter-centennial anniversary of the Ohio Academy of Sciences". Science. 43 (1102): 217–218.
- ———— (1920). "The development of the skull of the skink, Eumeces quinquelineatus L.". Journal of Morphology. 34 (1): 120–243.
- ———— (1925). "Darwin and Bryan: a study in method". Science. 61 (1575): 243–250.
- ———— (1935). An Introduction to Biology. Ginn and Company, Boston.

== Family life ==
Rice married Sarah Langton Abbott on March 20, 1901, and they had two children, Charlotte Rice and William Abbott Rice. Rice died February 4, 1960. Upon his death, his body was donated to the University of Chicago College of Medicine, but a memorial monument was erected at Indian Hill Cemetery in Middletown, Connecticut. Rice's son, William Abbott Rice (1912-1991) was a professor of geology at Mount Union College in Alliance, Ohio His daughter Charlotte Rice (1904-1990) married political scientist and Princeton and Denison University professor Albert Andrews Roden (1906-2002).

== Genealogy ==
Edward Loranus Rice was a direct descendant of Edmund Rice, an English immigrant to Massachusetts Bay Colony, as follows:

- Edward Loranus Rice (1871-1960), son of
  - William North Rice (1845–1928), son of
    - William Rice (1821–1897), son of
      - William Rice (1788–1863), son of
        - Nathan Rice (1760–1838), son of
          - John Rice (1704–1771), son of
            - Ephraim Rice (1665–1732), son of
              - Thomas Rice (1625–1681), son of
                - Edmund Rice (1594–1663)
