= Foul Play (TV series) =

1981 American crime drama TV series

- Genre: Crime drama Drama
- Based on: Foul Play by Colin Higgins
- Developed by: Hal Sitowitz
- Starring: Deborah Raffin; Barry Bostwick; Richard Romanus; Greg Rice; John Rice; Mary Jo Catlett
- Composer: David Michael Frank (as David Frank)
- Country of origin: United States
- Original language: English
- No. of seasons: 1
- No. of episodes: 10 (5 unaired)

Production
- Executive producer: Hal Sitowitz
- Producers: Thomas L. Miller; Robert L. Boyett
- Running time: 60 minutes
- Production companies: Miller-Milkis-Boyett Productions; Myrt-Hal Productions; Paramount Television

Original release
- Network: ABC
- Release: January 26 – August 23, 1981

Foul Play is an American drama series that aired from January 26 until August 23, 1981, on ABC. The series was based on the 1978 film of the same name, and retained many of the same characterizations, as well as the San Francisco setting of the film. The lead roles played by Goldie Hawn and Chevy Chase in the film were taken over by Deborah Raffin and Barry Bostwick, respectively, in the series. The series was produced by Thomas L. Miller (who co-produced the film), Robert L. Boyett and Hal Sitowitz, under Paramount Television.

== Premise ==
Based on the 1978 film of the same name, the series is about a bumbling detective in San Francisco and his girlfriend.

== Cast ==
- Deborah Raffin as Gloria Munday
- Barry Bostwick as Detective Tucker Pendleton
- Richard Romanus as Captain Vito Lombardi
- Greg Rice as Ben
- John Rice as Beau
- Mary Jo Catlett as Stella

== Episodes ==
No.	Title	Written by	Original release date
1	"The Big Bang"	Hal Sitowitz	January 26, 1981
2	"Sins of the Father"	Steven E. de Souza	February 2, 1981
A skeleton is found in a time capsule.
3	"Double Play"	Steven E. de Souza	February 16, 1981
Gloria is involved in the fatal shooting of a business tycoon.
4	"Play It Again, Tuck"	Irving Pearlberg	February 23, 1981
Gloria is presented with a jewel case containing a secret.
5	"Hit and Run"	Jimmy Huston	August 23, 1981
A hitman tries to stop the captain from testifying.
6	"Postage Due"	Bob Shayne	Unaired
7	"He Flies Through the Air"	Parke Perine	Unaired
8	"Exit the Dragon"	N/A	Unaired
9	"The Terrible Tara O'Hara"	N/A	Unaired
10	"Fowl Play"	N/A	Unaired
