= Judge Rice =

Judge Rice may refer to:

- Ben Herbert Rice Jr. (1889–1964), judge of the United States District Court for the Western District of Texas
- Eugene Rice (1891–1967), judge of the United States District Court for the Eastern District of Oklahoma
- Stephen E. Rice (1905–1958), judge of the United States Tax Court
- Thomas O. Rice (born 1960), judge of the United States District Court for the Eastern District of Washington
- Walter Herbert Rice (born 1937), judge of the United States District Court for the Southern District of Ohio

== See also ==
- Justice Rice (disambiguation)
