= Mystical Seven (Wesleyan) =

Honor society at Wesleyan University, US

- Founded: July 17, 1837; 189 years ago Wesleyan University
- Type: Honor (former social)
- Affiliation: Independent
- Status: Active
- Scope: Local (formerly National)
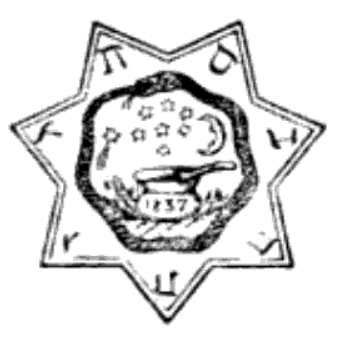
- Member badge
- Colors: Violet, Indigo, Blue, Green, Yellow, Orange, and Red; or White
- Publication: The Classic; The Mystic Messenger
- Chapters: 2 active, 12 inactive
- Nickname: Mystics
- Headquarters: 45 Wyllys Avenue; Middletown, Connecticut 06459; United States

The Mystical Seven was a society founded in 1837 at Wesleyan University in Middletown, Connecticut, United States. Members were called Mystics. The society died in 1861, with its surviving temples merging into other national fraternities. It was restarted as a local honorary at Wesleyan University in the late 20th century.

== History ==
=== Early history ===
The Mystical Seven was founded in 1837, just six years after the founding of Wesleyan University. It was recognized by the university on October 16, 1837. It was Wesleyan's first society, founded a half year before Eclectic (May 1838). Of the seven founding members, senior Hamilton Brewer was recognized as primus inter pares behind the establishment of the society. The members met each week at their meeting space in the furnished attic of Wesleyan's North College. The society began Wesleyan's first student publication, The Classic, in 1840.

The Mystical Seven is always referred to as a society, but in its 19th-century form, it was one of the early college fraternities. Through the 1840s and 1850s, it was a peer organization with Wesleyan's Eclectic Society, Psi Upsilon, Alpha Delta Phi, and Chi Psi. From about 1856 to 1865, the Mystical Seven were partners in the Alpha Eating Club with the Eclectic Society.

The society was especially known for the quality of its arcana. "Never have I seen anything so original, so quaint, so completely unique, or irresistible in its solemn humor, as the Mystical Seven initiation and the ceremonies of its meetings." A similar commentator noted that the Mystical Seven, "in some respects [was] among the most ambitious efforts at creating a college secret society with a good ritual."

The Mystical Seven also had a serious academic and philosophical aspect, including public events like bringing Ralph Waldo Emerson to speak at the campus, or later Orestes Brownson, whose address to the society was later published as "Social Reform: An Address Before the Society of the Mystical Seven".

The Mystical Seven was the first college fraternal organization to admit women, and initiated several during the 1840s. Later, a law was enacted in the society that allowed the wife of a member to become initiated at that member's discretion.

The Mystical Seven expanded to several other universities. The chapters of the society were recognized as "temples", with the "Temple of the Wand" being the parent chapter at Wesleyan. In 1841, the first temple was founded outside of Wesleyan, when Mystical Seven was established at Emory University. Henry Branham brought the society from Wesleyan to Emory, and there interested the president of the university, Augustus Baldwin Longstreet, the humorist author of Georgia Scenes, in membership. Branham later became Longstreet's son-in-law. Longstreet, his two daughters, and his two sons-in-law were all eventually made Mystics.

Historical accounts conflict as to whether or not the Temple of the Wand recognized the legitimacy of any of the other temples founded throughout southern universities. The Emory and Centenary College temples were founded by Wesleyan Mystics, who both claimed approval by the Temple of the Wand. The Georgia temple (at what was then known as Franklin College) was founded by George McIntosh Troup Hurt, a Mystic alumnus of Emory. The founder of the University of Mississippi temple is not known, but Henry Branham, who was living in Oxford, Mississippi at the time and active in campus politics, was likely involved.

The Mystical Seven society became inactive at Wesleyan in 1861; it had not been meeting as a society since 1858.

=== Southern revival ===
In the early 1880s, the University of Virginia temple was virtually alone. In 1884, it created chapters at the University of North Carolina at Chapel Hill and Davidson College. The following year, it reconstituted itself as the Mystic Seven Fraternity, and used the name Phi Theta Alpha (ΦΘΑ) from 1885 to 1890. This new society was led by Cooper D. Schmidt. The fraternity had lost almost all the traditions of the older society, motivating leaders of the society to reach out to Northern (Wesleyan) alumni, including Dr. Pierce, to organize a catalogue and begin publication of The Mystic Messenger in 1878, which included annual reports and stories about the history of the society. The organization, now with four active chapters, began negotiations with Beta Theta Pi in 1888 and merged with Beta Theta Pi the following year.

=== Owl & Wand ===
In 1867, a petitioning group for a Delta Kappa Epsilon (ΔΚΕ) chapter at Wesleyan claimed initiation into the Mystical Seven to secure a ΔΚΕ charter, which was successful. In 1868, the Delta Kappa Epsilon members formed a new society called Owl & Wand, which was to be a senior society and use the premises of the old Mystical Seven (the attic of North College). As a senior society, it took as members individuals who were already members of four-year college fraternities, and was considered an honorary society. In 1890, the Owl & Wand group claimed to be a direct extension of Mystical Seven. However, detractors claim that the 1890 restoration was made without any knowledge of the workings of the fraternal order of the Mystical Seven or an intent to restore them. After seventy years of existence, the senior society died off.

=== Reformation ===
In the 1960s, several alumni of the Mystical Seven at Wesleyan restarted the society by 1970–71. At a time when historically single-sex student groups were pressured to become coed, the new Mystical Seven embraced this change, helping it to survive a decade that was detrimental to many other student societies and fraternities. The society, as it was rebuilt in the 1970s, has continued successfully to the present day.

During the 1980s, a separate group of at Wesleyan students also decided to re-establish the original society. Much work was employed in reconstructing the practices of the original society, including the addition of much written material from several sources. The two Mystical Seven groups clashed during 1990 and again in 2001, in a dispute over which group was legitimate. Today, the two groups co-exist with little interaction with each other.

The meeting place of the senior society Mystical Seven on Wyllys Avenue, known as the Mystic Templum, was gutted by fire in 1995. The building remained boarded up until it was razed in the summer of 2007. The seven-sided building, with seven-sashed windows and a seven-paneled door, had been dedicated in 1912.

== Symbols ==
The colors of the Mystical Seven were violet, indigo, blue, green yellow, orange, and red or white. The fraternities publications were The Classic, started in 1840, and The Mystical Messenger, started in 1878. Its nickname is the Mystics. Instead of Greek references, the society chose Hebraic.

== Temples ==
Chapters of the Mystical Seven are known as temples. There appears never to have been a connection between the Wesleyan Mystics and the identically named and much later formed local honor society (1907) at the University of Missouri. During its first iteration, the temples of the Mystical Seven were as follows.

Chapter	Charter date and range	Institution	Location	Status	Ref.
Temple of the Wand (1)	July 17, 1837 – 1867; 1889–1890	Wesleyan University	Middletown, Connecticut	Merged (ΔΚΕ)	(Note: The Mystical Seven's first temple at Wesleyan abandoned the national it had created to join ΔΚΕ. It was briefly re-established in 1899, but the latter group similarly left to join ΒΘΠ.) (Note: Became the Gamma Phi chapter of Delta Kappa Epsilon.)
Temple of the Sword	1841–1858	Emory University	Atlanta, Georgia	Inactive	(Note: The Emory and Georgia temples folded due to their schools' faculties banning student membership in unapproved secret societies.)
Temple of the Wreath (1)	1843–1844	Transylvania University	Lexington, Kentucky	Inactive	(Note: The Transylvania temple was destroyed during the Mexican War. (noted in Price))
Temple of the Skull and Bones	1844–1859	University of Georgia	Athens, Georgia	Inactive	(Note: During the time the temple was active, an early name used by the University of Georgia was Franklin College, to denote its first building, housing the College of Arts and Sciences.)
Temple of the Star	October 8, 1859 – 1861; 1866–1878	University of Mississippi	Oxford, Mississippi	Inactive	(Note: The Mississippi temple was revived after the Civil War by an antebellum member, but folded in 1878 when its last member graduated.) (Note: The Mississippi temple was reported to have "created the Virginia temple", but the cryptic note says it "did not pass to it the traditions of the society." (noted in Price)) (Note: There is confusion regarding the formation date of this temple. Price's book says 1848, but a handwritten scroll from Star "mystic" (~member) Edwin Hamilton Dial, now in the archives of Beta Theta Pi, has its formation date as specifically 8 October 1859.)
Temple of the Wreath (2)	1849–1861	Centenary College	Shreveport, Louisiana	Inactive	(Note: Centenary College was located in Jackson, Louisiana, while the Mystical Seven were active on the campus. The Centenary temple did not survive the Civil War.)
Temple of the Scroll & Pen	1853–1871	Genesee College	Lima, New York	Merged (ΔΚΕ)	(Note: Genesee Wesleyan was located in Lima, New York, while the Mystical Seven were active on the campus. The Genesee temple withdrew and became the Phi Gamma chapter of ΔΚΕ when the college moved to Syracuse.)
Temple of the Hands and Torch	1868–1890	University of Virginia	Charlottesville, Virginia	Merged (ΒΘΠ)	(Note: ΒΘΠ's Omicron chapter had been dormant since 1875, but was restored with the absorption of the Mystical Seven's Temple of the Hands and Torch in 1890. Hand and Torch had been formed immediately after the Civil War, in 1867.)
Temple of the Serpent	1867–1876	Cumberland University	Lebanon, Tennessee	Inactive	
Temple of the Star and the South	1884–1889	University of North Carolina	Chapel Hill, North Carolina	Merged (ΒΘΠ)	(Note: ΒΘΠ's Eta chapter had been dormant since 1860, but was restored with the absorption of the Mystical Seven's Temple of the Star and of the South in 1889. This temple of the Mystical Seven had been created through efforts by the Temple of the Hands and Torch from Virginia.)
Temple of the Sword and Shield	1884–1890	Davidson College	Davidson, North Carolina	Merged (ΒΘΠ)	(Note: ΒΘΠ's Phi Alpha chapter had been dormant since 1862, but was restored with the absorption of the Mystical Seven's Temple of the Sword and Shield in 1890. Efforts of the Temple of the Hands and Torch from Virginia had created this temple of the Mystical Seven.)
Temple of the Wand (2)	1889–1890	Wesleyan University	Middletown, Connecticut	Merged (ΒΘΠ)	(Note: Became Mu Epsilon chapter of ΒΘΠ)
Temple of the Owl and Wand	1890–c. 1963, 1971–197x ?, 1980	Wesleyan University	Middletown, Connecticut	Active	
Temple of the Wand (3)	1980s	Wesleyan University	Middletown, Connecticut	Active	

== Influences on other organizations ==
Since the Mystical Seven introduced the idea of the college fraternity into the South, it had considerable influence on the development of organizations in the Antebellum South. All private college societies were, for a time, called Mystic Association' in Georgia. A competitor society called W.W.W. was designed on principles more similar to the Mystical Seven than to Northern college fraternities. It has also been assumed that a society for adult men, not connected to colleges and universities, called the Order of Heptasophs, was at least organized on principles parallel to the Mystical Seven, if not by alumni of the Mystical Seven themselves. The resemblances of the ceremonies of the two societies "cannot be given at length; but they leave little room for doubt that...the Heptasophs or Seven Wise Men...is an indirect descendant of the Mystical Seven college fraternity," according to one source.

== Notable members ==
Following are some of the notable members of the Mystical Seven.

- Edward Gayer Andrews (Temple of the Wand), Methodist Bishop
- David J. Brewer (Temple of the Wand), associate justice of the Supreme Court of the United States
- Orestes Brownson (Temple of the Wand), Transcendentalist author
- Beverly Carradine (Temple of the Stari), Methodist minister
- John Prentiss Carter, Lieutenant Governor of Mississippi, Mississippi State Senate, and Mississippi House of Representatives
- Alonzo J. Edgerton (Temple of the Wand), U.S. Senator from Minnesota
- John B. Gordon (Temple of the Skull And Bones), major general of the Confederate States of America
- Miles T. Granger (Temple of the Wand), judge and U.S. Congressman
- William Henry Huntington (Temple of the Wand), Paris correspondent of the New York Tribune
- Lucius Quintus Cincinnatus Lamar (Temple of the Sword, honorary), associate justice of the United States Supreme Court
- Augustus Baldwin Longstreet (Temple of the Sword, honorary), president of Emory University, Centenary College, and the University of Mississippi
- Samuel Sobieski Nelles (Temple of the Wand), first president of Victoria University in the University of Toronto
- Robert Carter Pitman (Temple of the Wand), President of Massachusetts Senate
- Henry White Warren (Temple of the Wand), Massachusetts General Court and Methodist Bishop
- William Fairfield Warren (Temple of the Wand), first president of Boston University
