= Morris B. Crawford =

American academic (1852–1940)

Morris Barker Crawford (September 26, 1852 – 1940) was an American academic, and the first professor of physics at Wesleyan University in Middletown, Connecticut.

== Early life and education ==
He was born in 1852 in Sing Sing, now Ossining, New York, to the Rev. Morris DeCamp Crawford and Charlotte (Holmes) Crawford. Both his father and his grandfather were ministers. He graduated from Wesleyan University in 1874, and he was a member of the Eclectic Society and of Phi Beta Kappa. He earned a Master of Arts degree from Wesleyan in 1877.

== Career ==
He was a tutor in mathematics at Wesleyan from 1874 to 1877. He also served as registrar. From 1877 to 1880, he studied mathematics and physics at the University of Leipsic and the University of Berlin. He was appointed an instructor of physics in 1880, an associate professor in 1881, and a full professor in 1884. He was the first physics professor at Wesleyan, the Foss Professor of Physics. He retired in 1921, and was elected professor emeritus. He was a fellow of the American Association for the Advancement of Science and a member of the American Physical Society.

He was a member of the First Methodist Episcopal Church of Middletown beginning in his freshman year in college, and was active in the church throughout his life. This included rebuilding the church after fires in 1885 and 1930. He was very involved with the Eclectic Society, and supervised construction of its Henry Bacon-designed clubhouse in 1908.

== Family life ==
Crawford married Caroline Laura Rice (1856-1954) on December 25, 1883. She was the daughter of the Rev. Dr. William Rice, a noted Methodist minister and librarian who had also attended Wesleyan University. She graduated from Wesleyan in 1879, was elected to Phi Beta Kappa, and earned a master's degree in 1882. Morris B. Crawford was a proponent of coeducation at Wesleyan, and he met his wife while they were both students at the university. They had three children; Holmes Crawford (1884-1886), Frederick North Crawford (1886-1922), who graduated from Wesleyan in 1908, and became a chemist, and Margaret Crawford (1889-1929), who graduated with high honors from Wesleyan in 1910. They are buried at Indian Hill Cemetery in Middletown, Connecticut.
