= John Rice =

John Rice may refer to:

== Politicians ==
- John Rice (fl. 1601), Member of Parliament (MP) for Wootton Bassett
- John Rice (alderman) (c. 1968–2015), Chicago alderman
- John Rice (deputy), member of House of Commons of the North Carolina General Assembly of 1777 for Wake County
- John A. Rice (politician) (1832–1906), politician from Wisconsin
- John B. Rice (1832–1893), U.S. Representative from Ohio
- John Blake Rice (1809–1874), mayor of Chicago, Illinois, 1865–1869, and later a U.S. Representative
- John Campbell Rice (1864–1937), associate justice of the Idaho Supreme Court
- John H. Rice (1816–1911), U.S. Representative from Maine
- John McConnell Rice (1831–1895), United States Representative for Kentucky
- John S. Rice (1899–1985), politician from Pennsylvania
- John T. Rice (1839–1925), politician from Wisconsin
- John Joe Rice (1893–1970), Irish Sinn Féin politician

== Actors ==
- John Rice, actor for the King's Men playing company, 1607–25
- Jack Rice (1893–1968), American actor
- John C. Rice (1857–1915), Broadway stage actor

== Sports ==
- John Rice (cricketer) (born 1949), English cricketer, played for Hampshire County Cricket Club
- John Rice (umpire) (1918–2011), American League umpire, 1955–1973
- John H. Rice (American football), American football coach, college administrator, and professor

== Others ==
- John Rice (1951–2005), one of the identical twin dwarf Rice brothers
- John Rice (banker) (c. 1832–?), president of Georgia National Bank in late 1860s
- John Rice (director), screenwriter and director of The Happy Elf
- John A. Rice (musicologist) (born 1956), American musicologist and Mozart scholar
- John Andrew Rice (1888–1968), founder of the Black Mountain College
- John G. Rice, former vice chairman of General Electric, and former president and CEO of GE Infrastructure
- John M. Rice (chess composer) (born 1937), former president of Permanent Commission of the FIDE for Chess Compositions
- John R. Rice, inventor of the Angel paintball gun
- John R. Rice (computer scientist) (1934–2024), American computer scientist and mathematician
- John R. Rice (pastor) (1895–1980), Baptist evangelist and pastor, founder of The Sword of the Lord
- John Raymond Rice (1914–1950), U.S. Army soldier killed in South Korea, known for the circumstances surrounding his burial
