= Edward Hyde Rice =

- Born: October 27, 1847; Boston, Massachusetts, US
- Died: May 9, 1895 (aged 47); Springfield, Massachusetts, US
- Education: Wesleyan University
- Occupation: Academic
- Parent(s): William Rice and Caroline L. North

Edward Hyde Rice (October 27, 1847 – May 9, 1895) was an American academic who led many institutions of secondary education in Massachusetts

== Early life and education ==
He was born in Boston, the second son of the Rev. William Rice and Caroline Laura North. His siblings included William North Rice, Charles Francis Rice and Catherine Laura Rice.

He graduated from the Springfield High School in 1866 and from Wesleyan University in 1870. He was a member of Phi Beta Kappa and the Eclectic Society, for which he composed the song "Tis Pleasant to Clasp the Hand of a Brother." From 1873–1875, he studied in the universities of Berlin, Leipzig, and France, and earned a Ph.D. from the College de France in Paris.

== Career ==
He was widely known in local public schools. From 1870 to 1871, he served as principal of Holliston High School in Holliston, Massachusetts, then in 1871–72 as principal of Malden High School in Malden, Massachusetts. Following further study in Europe from 1873–1875, he was principal of the high school in Chicopee, Massachusetts from 1875 to 1879, in Lawrence, Massachusetts from 1879 to 1880, and Pittsfield High School, in Pittsfield, Massachusetts in 1881.

He was Classical Master of the High School in Worcester, Massachusetts. Later, he was a Professor of Greek at the Western University of Pennsylvania. For the last two years of his life, he taught privately in Springfield, MA.

He served on the Board of Visitors of Boston University from 1880 to 1881, and also worked in his father's library, the Springfield City Library. In 1874, he wrote an article, "Our Public Schools" in The Massachusetts Teacher: A Journal of School and Home Education, in which he discussed the schools of the state, and compared them favorably to several European countries. In 1875, he became a Freemason.

== Family life ==
He married Emma Isabelle Adams in Springfield on August 12, 1878. He died in Springfield in 1895, predeceasing his father by two years and his mother by four. His funeral was held at his parents' house at 54 Court Street.

After his death, Emma Adams lived on Vernon Street in Newton.

== Genealogy ==
Edward Hyde Rice was a direct descendant of Edmund Rice, an English immigrant to Massachusetts Bay Colony, as follows:

- Edward Hyde Rice, son of

- William Rice (1821–1897), son of

- William Rice (1788–1863), son of
- Nathan Rice (1760–1838), son of
- John Rice (1704–1771), son of

- Ephraim Rice (1665–1732), son of
- Thomas Rice (1625–1681), son of

- Edmund Rice (1594–1663)
