= George W. Rice (businessman) =

American businessman

George Washington Rice (November 7, 1823 – August 4, 1856) was an American businessman known for founding the Massachusetts Mutual Life Insurance Company and the Springfield 5 Cent Savings Bank.

== Early life ==
George Washington Rice was born on November 7, 1823, at Springfield, Massachusetts, to John and Joanna Warriner Rice. His paternal grandfather was a Revolutionary War veteran. His uncle, William Rice was a member of the Massachusetts House of Representatives. Jerusha was a daughter of David Warriner of Wilbraham, Massachusetts.

== Family and genealogy ==
G.W. Rice married Jane C. Marsh on April 11, 1849, in West Springfield, Massachusetts. Children of George and Jane Rice were George W. Rice, Jr. (1853–1933), Katherine Rice (born 1855) and Ada Rice (born 1856).

Rice was a direct descendant of Edmund Rice an early immigrant to Massachusetts Bay Colony as follows:

- George Washington Rice, son of

- John Rice (1782–1841), son of
- Nathan Rice (1760–1838), son of
- John Rice (1704–1771), son of

- Ephraim Rice (1665–1732), son of
- Thomas Rice (1626–1681), son of

- Edmund Rice (c. 1594–1663)

== Death ==
George Washington Rice died on August 4, 1856, in Springfield, MA.
