= Whiskey Tit Press =

Independent literary publisher in Hancock, Vermont

Whiskey Tit Press (often styled Whisk(e)y Tit) is an independent literary publisher based in Hancock, Vermont. Founded in 2014 by publisher Miette Gillette, the press publishes experimental, cross-genre, and hybrid works of fiction, poetry, and creative nonfiction.

The press produces full-length books as well as two literary periodicals, Common Well and Whiskey Tit Journal.

== History ==
Whiskey Tit Press was founded in 2014 by Miette Gillette. According to Seven Days, Gillette began the press after encountering difficulty placing unconventional manuscripts by friends with traditional publishers. What began as a small personal project developed into an independent press publishing multiple titles each year.

== Editorial focus ==
Whiskey Tit Press focuses on experimental and genre-bending literature, particularly works that do not conform to conventional publishing categories. The press states that its mission is to publish work marked by “intellectual rigour, unrelenting playfulness, and visual beauty,” often producing texts that would otherwise be overlooked in larger corporate publishing.

== Publications and distribution ==
Whiskey Tit publishes approximately six to ten titles per year. Distribution is through Ingram and Asterism Books.

== Selected authors ==
Select authors published by the press include:

- Adam al-Sirgany
- Terena Elizabeth Bell
- Jesi Bender
- Matthew Burnside
- Dave Fitzgerald
- Yarrow Paisley
- David Leo Rice
- Gina Tron
- Joey Truman
- Thomas Kendall
