= Springfield Cemetery (Springfield, Massachusetts) =

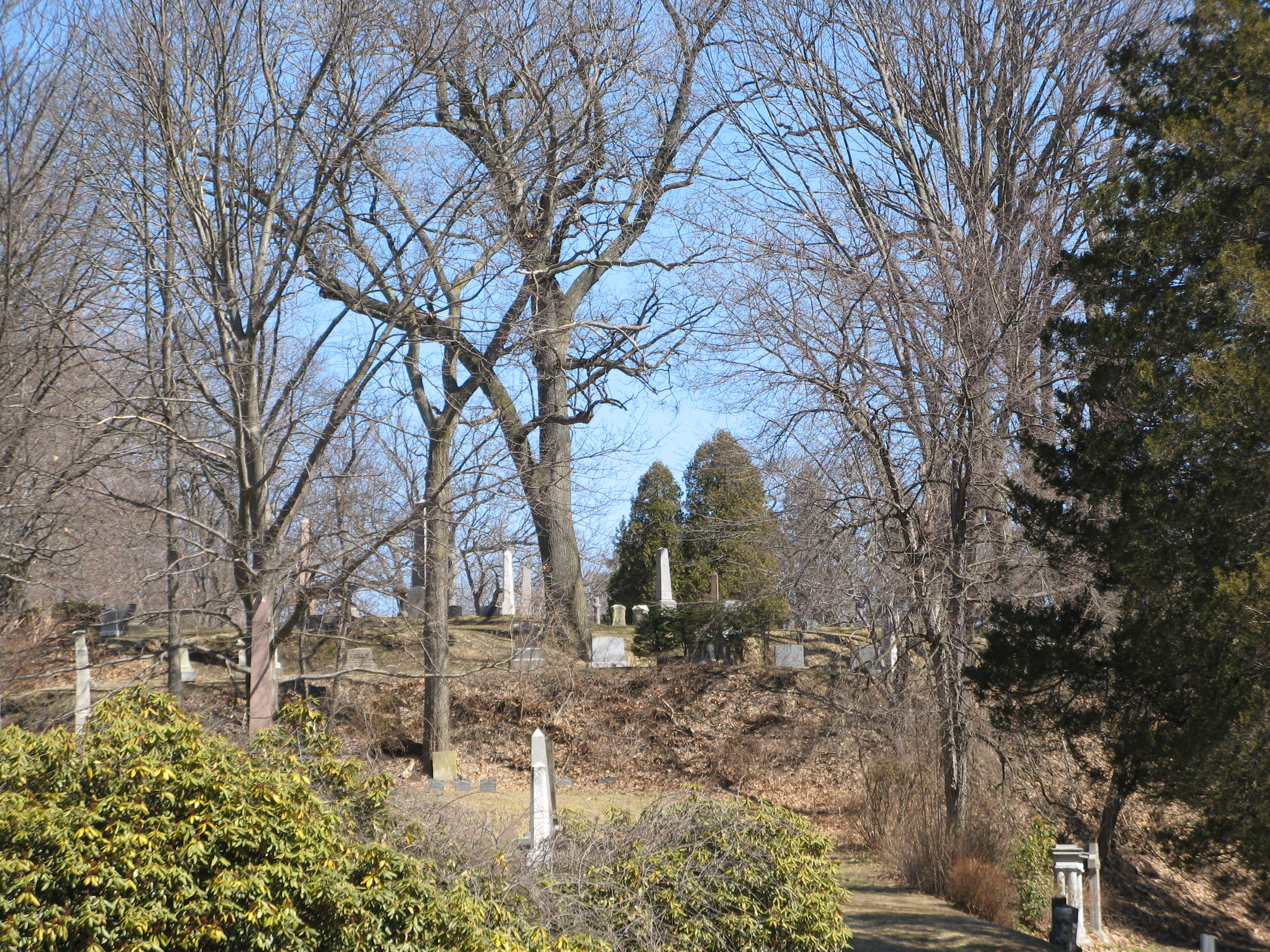
- Springfield Cemetery
- Interactive map of Springfield Cemetery

Details
- Established: 1841
- Location: Springfield, Massachusetts
- Country: US
- Coordinates: 42°06′09.32″N 72°34′29.46″W
- Type: Private
- Style: Rural cemetery
- Size: 40 acres (0.16 km^{2})
- Website: Springfield Cemetery
- Find a Grave: Springfield Cemetery

Springfield Cemetery is located in the Connecticut River Valley city of Springfield, Massachusetts. The cemetery opened in 1841 and was planned on the model of a rural cemetery. With the relocation of remains from the city's earliest burying ground, the cemetery became the final resting place for many of Springfield's 17th and 18th century pioneer settlers.

== History ==
The Springfield Cemetery was designed in the landscaped tradition of the rural cemetery, evoking a pastoral, garden environment in an urban setting. The cemetery is located on a plot of land once owned by Martha Ferre and known as ‘Martha’s Dingle’. A dingle is a small wooded valley, a dell.

The land was purchased from Alexander Bliss on May 28, 1841 for the purpose of establishing the cemetery. The first burial occurred on September 6, 1841, Early in its history the cemetery was also known as ‘Peabody Cemetery’, in recognizer of one of its founders, Rev. William Peabody, a local Unitarian minister. In 1848 the remains of Springfield's earliest European settlers were transferred to the cemetery from the Old Burying Ground by the Connecticut River. Relocated remains included those of Mary Holyoke, daughter of William Pynchon, known as the founder of Springfield.

== Chapel and columbarium ==
The Dorcas Chapin Chapel was constructed in 1885 with funds donated by the wife of Chester W. Chapin. Designed in the English Gothic style, the chapel contains stained glass windows created by the L.C. Tiffany Company and provides a seating capacity for fifty.

== Soldier's Rest, Civil War monument ==
Soldier's Rest is a Civil War monument that was dedicated in 1877 and depicts a Union private at rest. The funds used to commission the monument were raised by women of the city who, in 1862, had developed the Soldier’s Rest Association to support the needs of soldiers, returning veterans and their families. The statue stands above the Soldiers plot, with graves both at its base and more below a descending slope. At least 200 Civil War soldiers are buried in the cemetery.

== Notable burials ==
- George Ashmun, U.S. Congressman, member of the Massachusetts State Legislature, lawyer
- James Barnes, Brigadier General, Union Army, Civil War
- Milton Bradley, businessman, considered a pioneer of the board game industry, founder of the Milton Bradley Company
- Andrew Symmes Bryant, Civil War Congressional Medal of Honor recipient
- Thornton Waldo Burgess, conservationist, author, journalist
- William Barron Calhoun, U.S. Congressman from Massachusetts
- Calvin Clifford Chaffee, U.S. Congressman from Massachusetts, ardent slavery abolitionist
- Chester W. Chapin, U.S. Congressman from Massachusetts, businessman
- Thomas Dwight, U.S. Congressman from Massachusetts
- Chester Harding, portrait painter of prominent 19th century Americans
- Josiah Gilbert Holland, novelist, poet and newspaper editor
- Samuel Knox, U.S. Congressman from Missouri
- F. O. Matthiessen, Harvard professor, literary critic, author of ’’American Renaissance: Art and Expression in the Age of Emerson and Whitman’’
- Horace A. Moses, industrialist and philanthropist, co-founder of Junior Achievement
- Everett Peabody, Colonel, Union Army, Civil War
- Charles Francis Rice, Methodist Episcopal Minister, son of William Rice
- Edward Hyde Rice, Educator, son of William Rice
- William Rice, Methodist Episcopal minister, Springfield City Librarian
- James Wolfe Ripley, Brigadier General, Union Army, Civil War
- Charles Louis Seeger, Jr., musicologist, composer, university instructor, father of Pete Seeger
- Ruth Crawford Seeger, singer, songwriter, political activist, stepmother of Pete Seeger
- Horace Smith, inventor, industrialist
- Elizabeth Towne, writer, publisher
- Mark Trafton, U.S. Congressman from Massachusetts

== Gallery ==
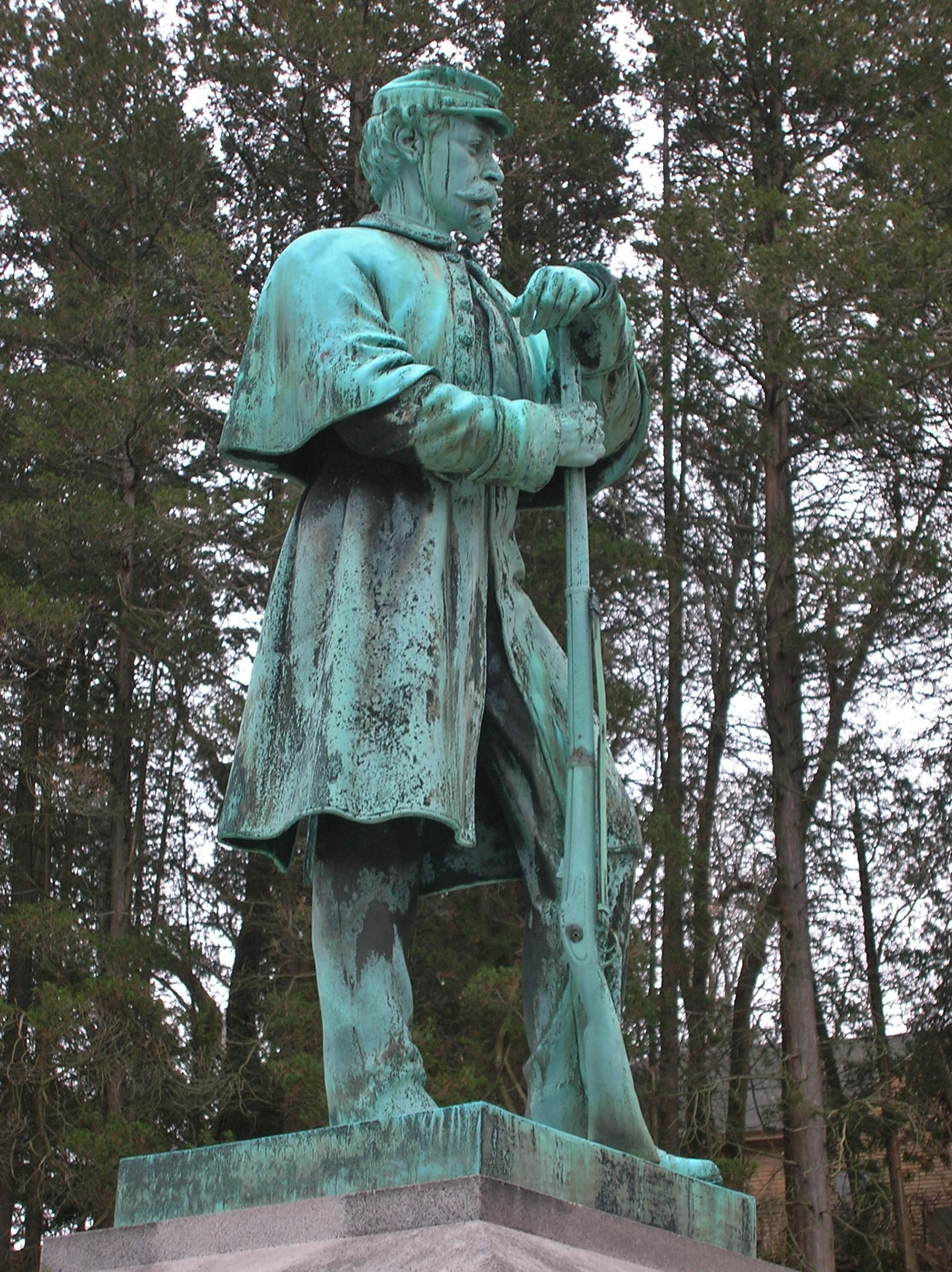
Soldier’s Rest Civil War monument (1877)

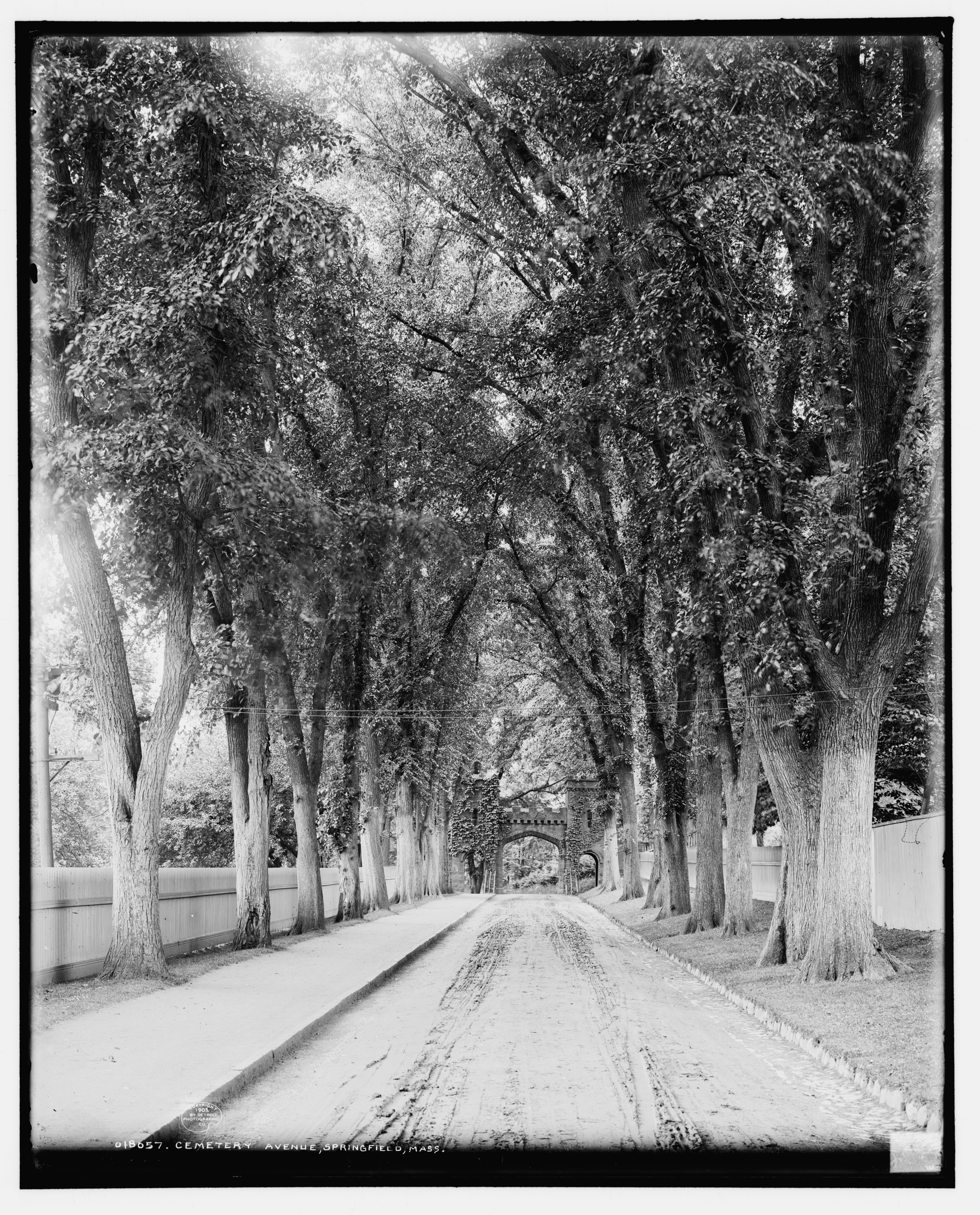
Cemetery Avenue approach to the gate (1905)

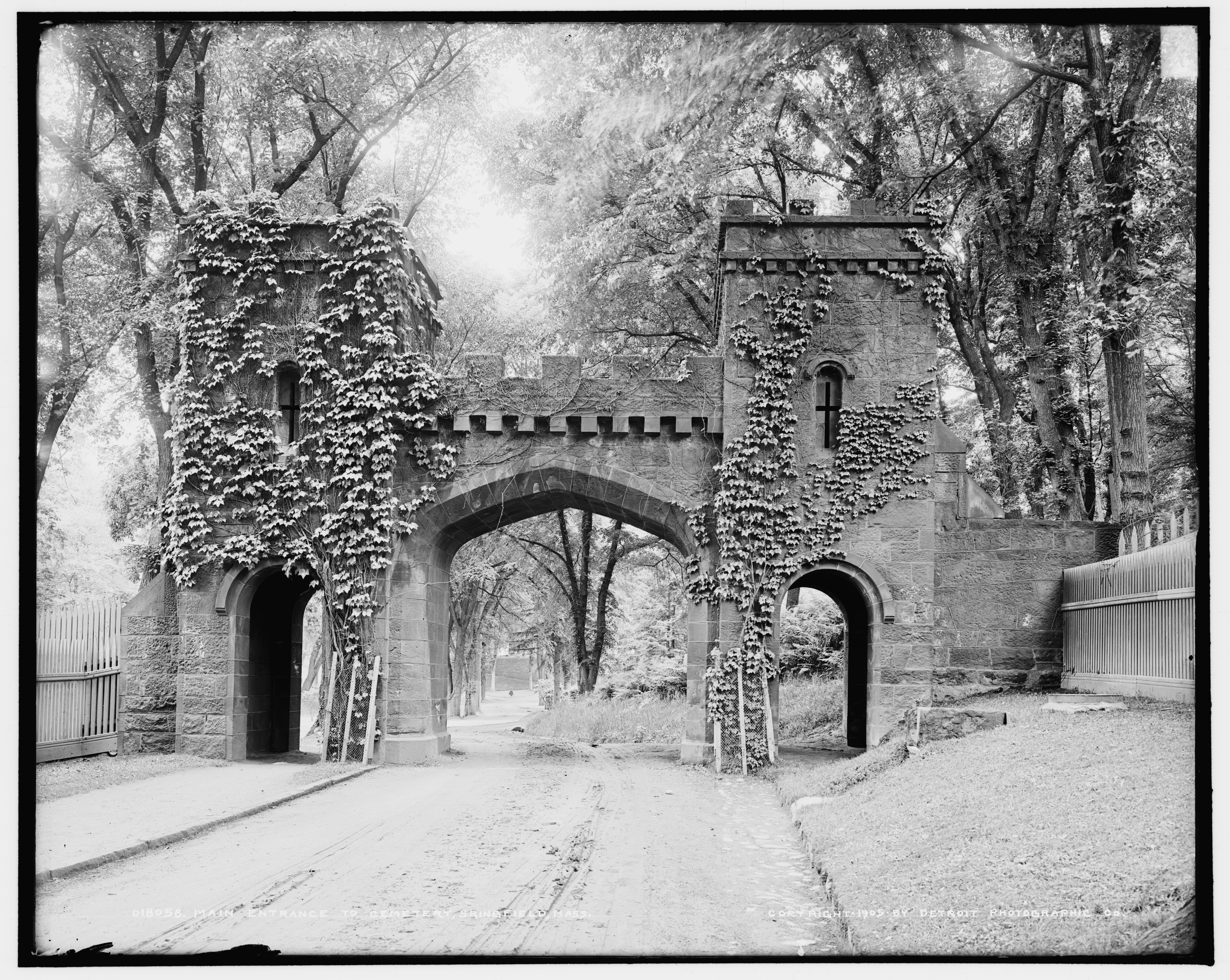
Cemetery gate (1905)

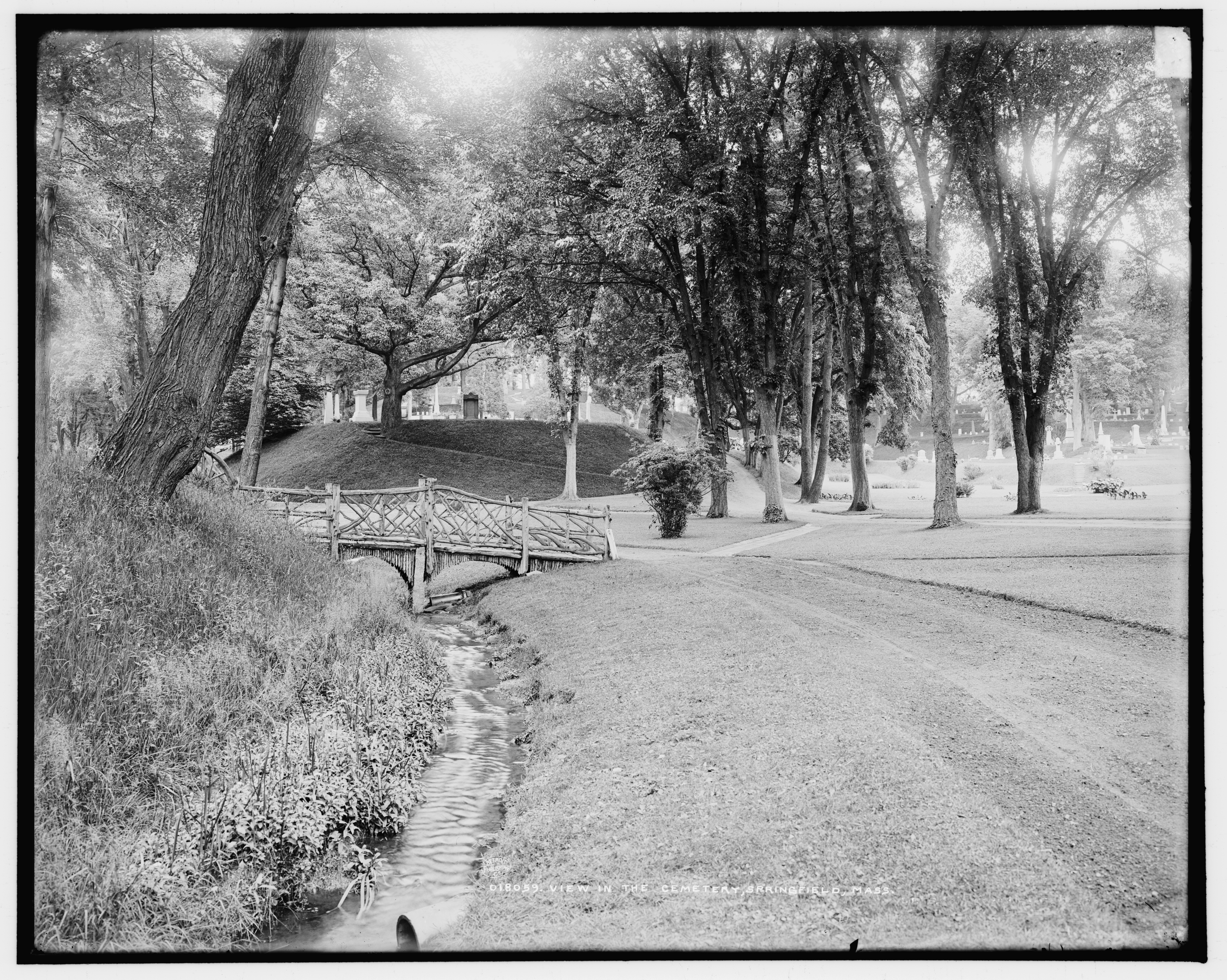
Cemetery grounds (1900–1906)

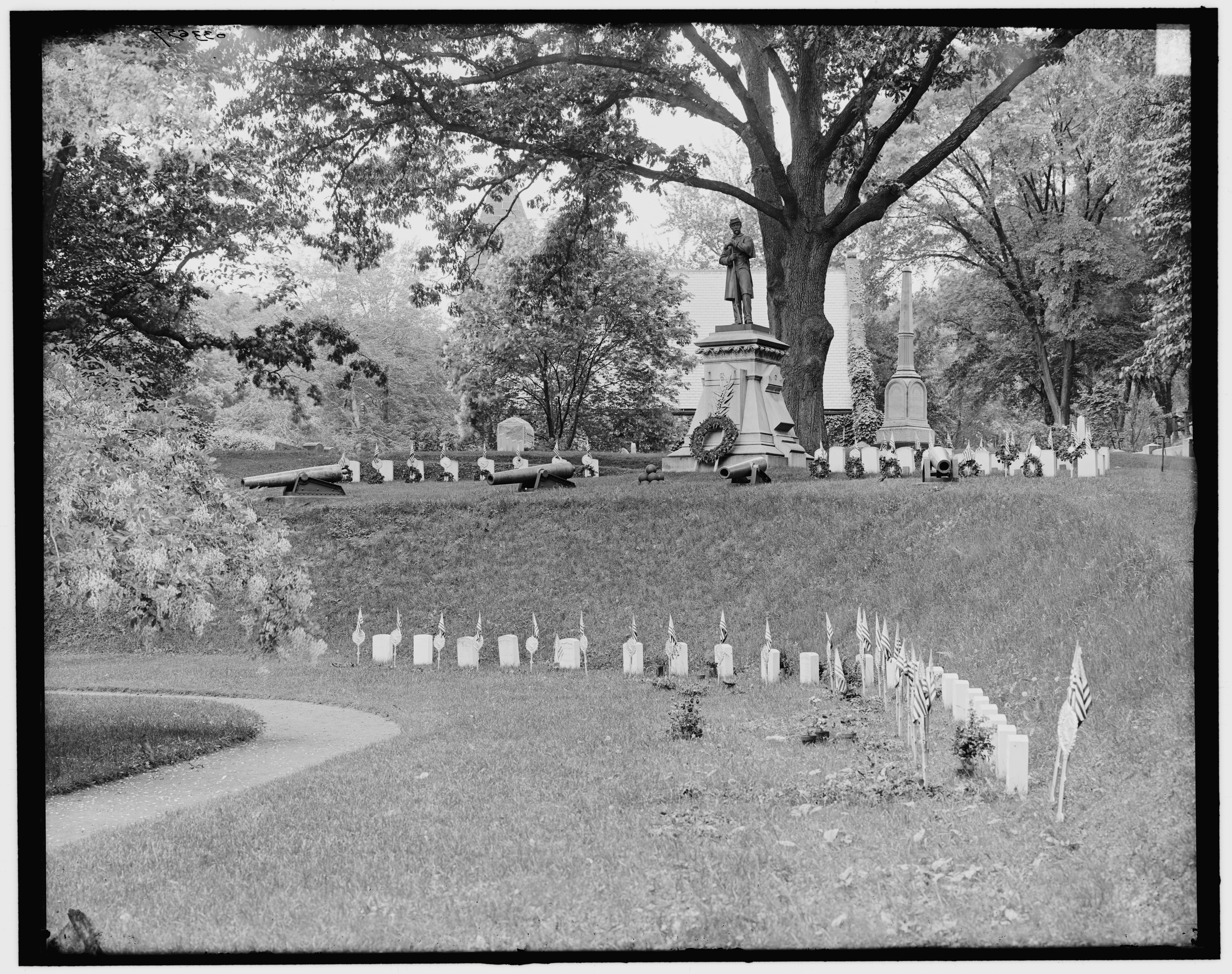
Soldiers plot & Soldier’s Rest monument

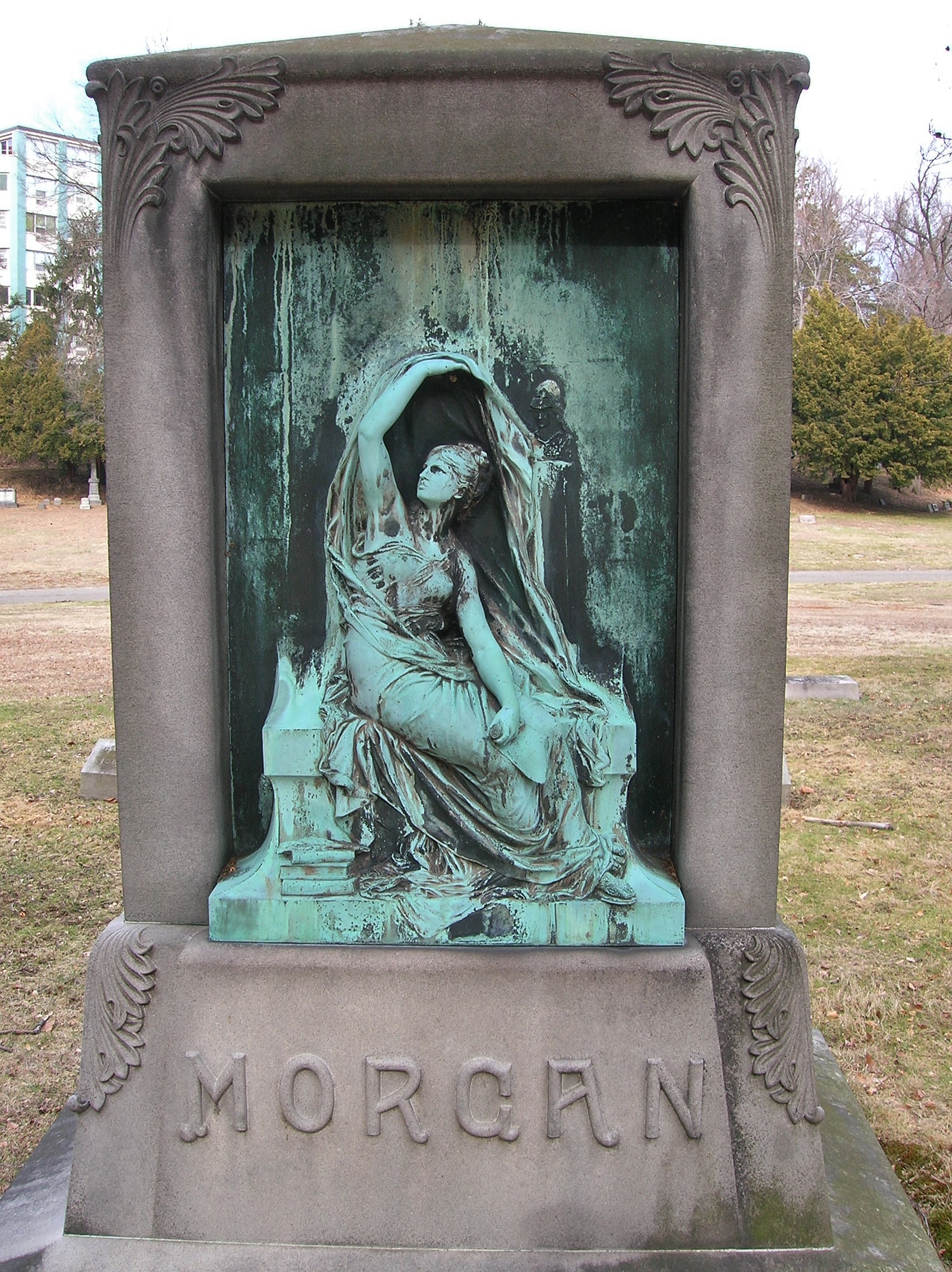
Morgan family monument by Henri-Michel-Antoine Chapu (approx. 1877–1891)

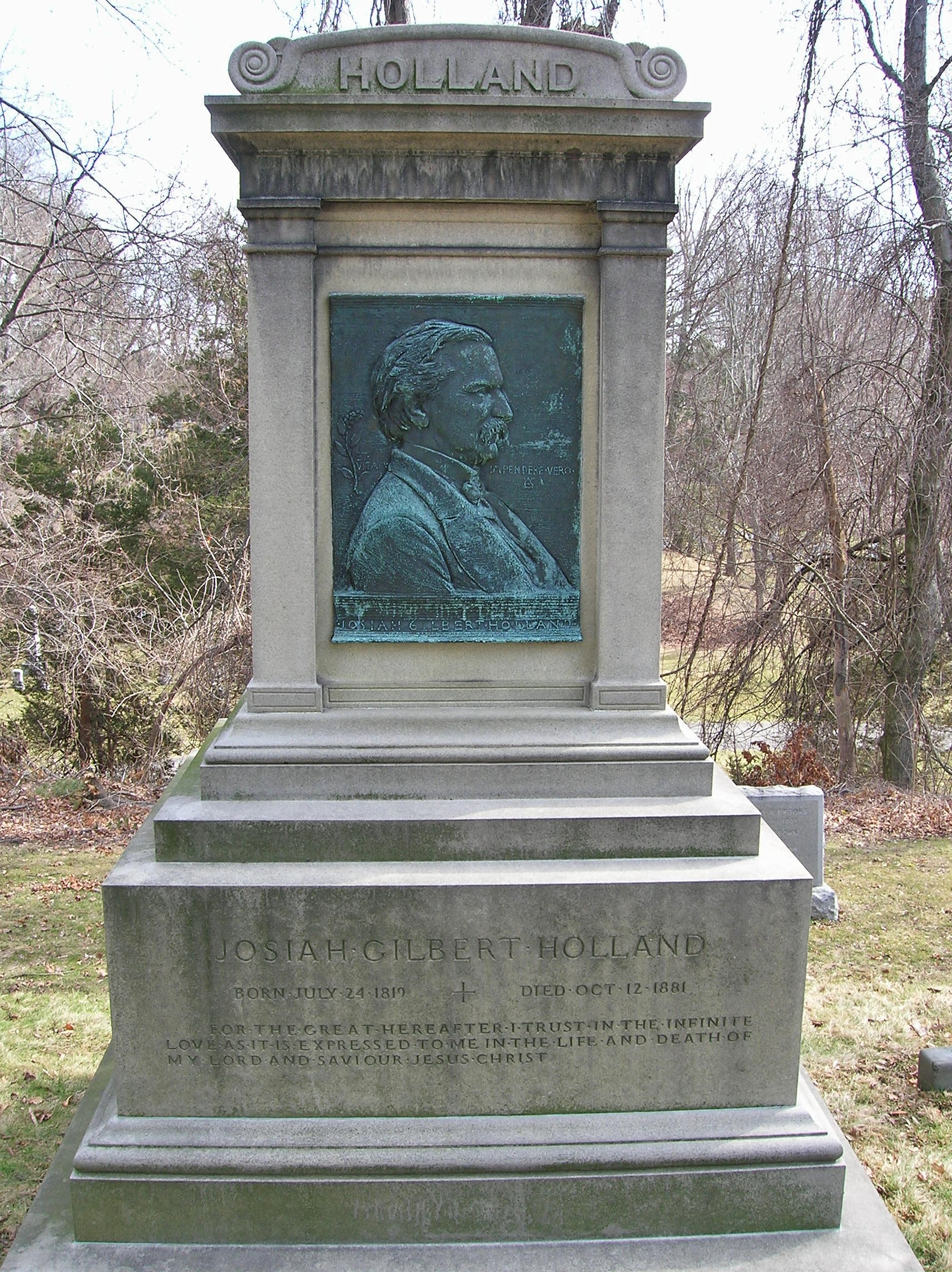
Josiah Gilbert Holland monument by Augustus Saint-Gaudens (1881)

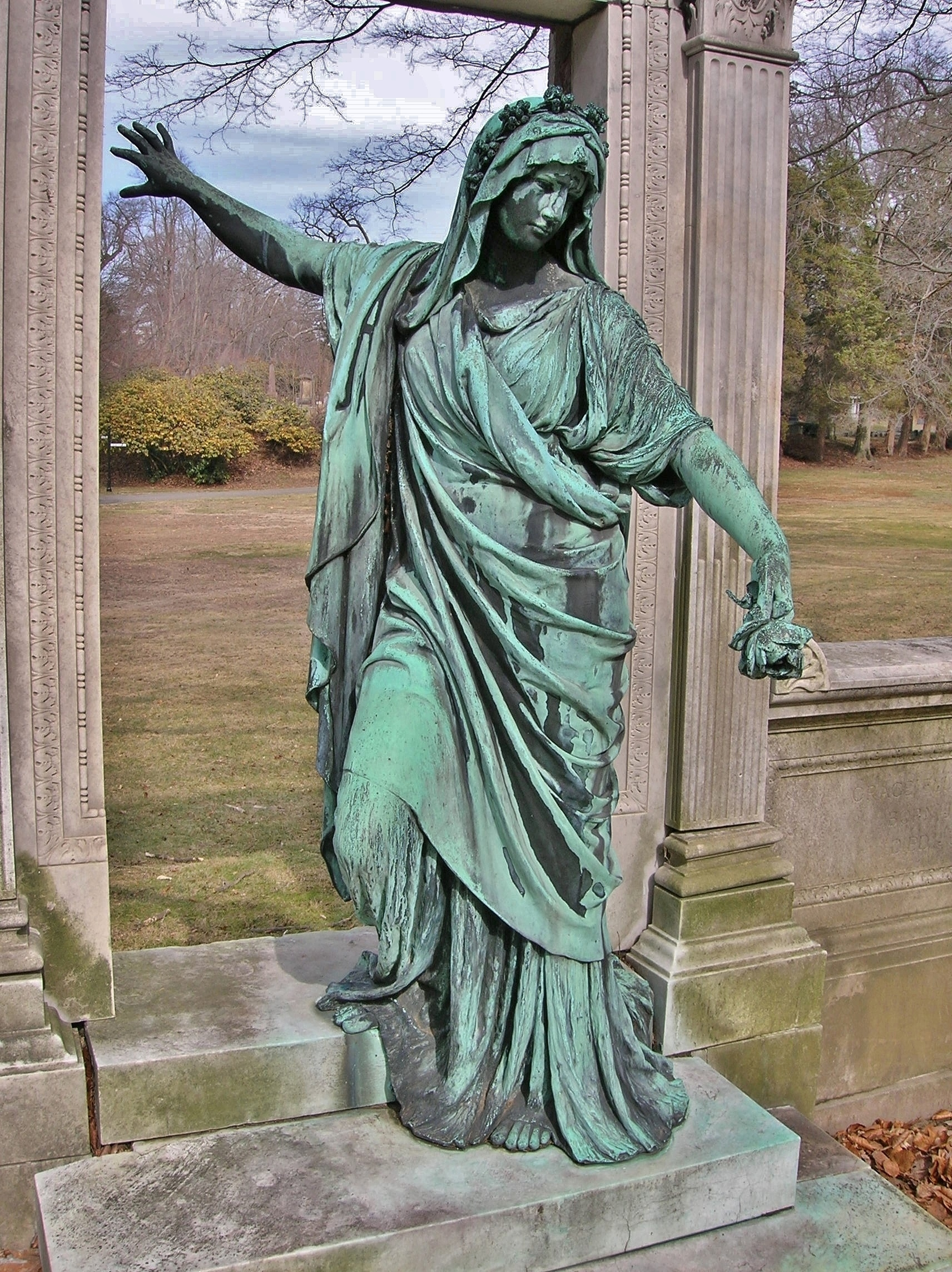
Monument in memory of Winthrop and Elizabeth Bliss Fuller, sculpted by Heinrich Waderé (installed 1910)

== Location ==
The main entrance to the Springfield Cemetery is located at 171 Maple Street, Springfield, MA
