= Thomas Spring Rice =

Thomas Spring Rice may refer to:

- Thomas Spring Rice, 1st Baron Monteagle of Brandon (1790–1866), British Chancellor of the Exchequer
- Thomas Spring Rice, 2nd Baron Monteagle of Brandon (1849–1926), Anglo-Irish peer
- Thomas Spring Rice, 3rd Baron Monteagle of Brandon (1883–1934), British diplomat

== See also ==
- Thomas Rice (disambiguation)
- Thomas Spring (disambiguation)
