= Adam al-Sirgany =

Arab-American Writer

- Education: Southern Illinois University Edwardsville (MA); University of Arizona (MFA)
- Occupations: Writer, editor, educator
- Writing career
- Genres: Fiction, poetry, literary criticism
- Notable works: More Hell: Stories, Tilled and Driftless
- Website: www.adamalsirgany.com

Adam al-Sirgany is an Arab-American writer, editor, and educator. He is currently serving as the Poet Laureate for the City of Rockford, Illinois. Known for his work in independent publishing and developmental editing, he is also an author of fiction.

== Education ==
Al-Sirgany holds holds degrees in creative writing from Knox College, the University of Arizona, and Southern Illinois University Edwardsville.

== Career ==
=== Editing and non-profit work ===
Al-Sirgany contributed to many projects as the Acquisitions and Developmental Editor for the SFWP, an independent press based in New Mexico. He is also a core editor at the literary arts non-profit 1-Week Critique, which provides editorial resources and workshops for writers.

He has held editorial and reading positions at several literary journals, including Sou'wester and Sonora Review..

=== Teaching and academic work ===
He is an instructor for the UCLA Extension Writers' Program and has taught literature for the Rochester Institute of Technology's Global Studies program. In 2023, he contributed to the textbook Designing Context-Rich Learning by Extending Reality, published by IGI Global.

=== Poet Laureate ===
In January 2026, the City of Rockford, the Rockford Public Library, and the Rockford Area Arts Council named al-Sirgany the city's Poet Laureate for a two-year term.

== Literary works ==
Al-Sirgany's fiction and prose often explore themes of Arab identity, rural landscapes of the Midwest, and neurodivergence.

- More Hell: Stories, Tilled and Driftless (Whisk(e)y Tit, 2025) ISBN 978-1952600623
