= William North (mason) =

William North (July 13, 1794 – January 3, 1872) was a well known civic leader in Lowell, Massachusetts, for whom the William North Lodge, A.F. & A.M. was named.

== Early life ==
He was born in Wethersfield, Connecticut, to Salmon North and Jerusha Leeds. His paternal grandfather, Isaac North was a lieutenant in the Revolution. William joined the Methodist Church in Goshen, Connecticut, in 1815.

== Time in Lowell ==
North came to Lowell in 1834. In Lowell, he was a member of the Chapel Hill Methodist Church. He was a founder of St. Paul's Methodist Episcopal Church, where he was a trustee, and remained active for many years. After his death, his sons donated a church bell in his memory. The 1839 church building is now the United Teen Equity Center.

In Lowell, William North was overseer of the Dyeing at the Middlesex Manufacturing Company. He was a member of the Board of Aldermen, the School Committee, and the vice president and director of the City Institution for Savings. He was also a member of the Lowell City Council, and the Massachusetts State Legislature.

He was a master of three lodges; Seneca Lodge in Torrington, Connecticut, Libanus Lodge in New Hampshire, and Pentucket Lodge in Lowell. He was also Deputy Master of the Grand Lodge of Massachusetts and Senior Grand Warden of the same lodge. When he died, his lodge was renamed "William North Lodge"

== Family life ==
He married Laura Hyde (1792-1847) of Oxford, Connecticut. She was the daughter of Nathan Hyde and Sally Thorpe, and sister of Orson Hyde. Their children were Caroline Laura North (1819-1899), William Leeds North (1821-1882), and Frederick Thorpe North (1828-1873). Caroline Laura North married the Reverend William Rice, and they named a son William North Rice.

== Genealogy ==
- William North, son of

- Salmon North (1763–1867), son of
- Isaac North (1729–1804), son of
- Isaac North (1702–1788), son of

- Thomas North (1673–1763), son of
- Thomas North (1657–1722), son of
- John North (1611–1691)
