= Col. L. C. Stevens' XI =

English cricket team

Col. L. C. Stevens' XI, sometimes shortened to L. C. Stevens' XI, was an English cricket team that played 30 matches (two of them first-class) at The Saffrons ground in Eastbourne from 1949 to 1968.

The teams were raised by Lieutenant-Colonel Leonard Cording Stevens OBE (born 1891, died 27 May 1968) who was president of Eastbourne Cricket and Football Club and Eastbourne Rugby Football Club. He also founded the Eastbourne school Chelmsford Hall Preparatory in 1920.

The matches ranged from one to three days' duration. Six were against touring Test sides, played at the beginning of their tours as warm-up matches. Most of the other matches were against Cambridge University, Oxford University or the Royal Air Force.

The two matches that were accorded first-class status were against Cambridge University in 1960 and 1961. Tom Graveney scored the team's only first-class century in the 1961 match. The 1960 match was a draw; Cambridge won the 1961 match.

Five Col. L. C. Stevens' XI players made their first-class debuts in the 1960 match, including Dr David Rice, at the age of 46, who captained the side in both matches. Two more players made their first-class debuts in the 1961 match. In contrast, the 1960 match was Sir Len Hutton's second-last first-class match.

The match against Cambridge University in 1963 was scheduled and played as a first-class match, but the MCC later rescinded its status.

Derrick Robins played in several non-first-class matches for Col. L. C. Stevens' XI in the 1950s and 1960s. After Colonel Stevens' death he organised his own team, D. H. Robins' XI, which also played matches at The Saffrons, some of them first-class, from 1969 to 1978.
