= Peter Rice =

Peter Rice may refer to:

- Peter Rice (structural engineer) (1935–1992), Irish structural engineer
- Peter Rice (executive) (born 1967), British film executive
- Peter Rice (footballer) (1938–2025), Australian rules footballer
- Peter Rice (construction worker) Mohawk worker, photographed on iconic New York image Lunch atop a Skyscraper
