= Sarah Rice (banker) =

Sarah Rice (died 1842) was an English businessperson and banker.

She married Henry Rice, Captain of the British East Indies Company and the owner of a bank and a company which managed Homing pigeons. She was widowed in 1797, and became the manager and senior partner of the company and the bank of her late spouse, the Latham, Rice and Co (Samuel Latham, Sarah Rice and Henshaw Latham) in Dover. She was the managing director until 1811, when she retired in favor of her son Edward Royd Rice. Her pigeons reportedly brought the news of Napoleon's defeat at Waterloo to London.

Rice is known as one of the potential role models for the character of Mrs Norris in Mansfield Park by Jane Austen.
