= David Rice (psychiatrist) =

English physician, naval officer, psychiatrist & cricketer

Personal information
- Born: 8 April 1914; Hellesdon, Norfolk, England
- Died: 13 September 1997 (aged 83); Brighton, East Sussex, England
- Batting: Right-handed
- Bowling: Right-arm medium-pace

Domestic team information
- Years: Team
- 1946: Norfolk
- 1960 to 1961: Col. L. C. Stevens' XI

Career statistics
Competition	First-class
Matches	2
Runs scored	32
Batting average	16.00
100s/50s	0/0
Top score	23
Balls bowled	150
Wickets	1
Bowling average	84.00
5 wickets in innings	0
10 wickets in match	0
Best bowling	1/37
Catches/stumpings	2/–
- Source: Cricinfo, 22 October 2016

Surgeon Lieutenant-Commander David Rice (8 April 1914 – 13 September 1997) was an English physician, naval officer, psychiatrist, first-class cricketer, and pioneer of lithium therapy.

== Medical career ==
After completing his medical studies at Cambridge University and St George's Hospital, Rice joined the Royal Naval Reserve in 1939 as a Surgeon Lieutenant. He served in the Navy throughout the war, finishing with the rank of Surgeon Lieutenant-Commander.

Rice was one of the pioneers of the use of lithium therapy for the mentally ill. After the war he worked as Deputy Medical Superintendent at Graylingwell Hospital, a large psychiatric hospital in Chichester in Sussex. In the early 1950s an Australian colleague showed him an article by John Cade in The Medical Journal of Australia on the beneficial effects of lithium on patients with mania. He decided to try it on some of his more severely affected patients, and found it worked in many cases. He wrote up the results in a 1956 edition of the Journal of Mental Science, after which his work was followed up in Britain by his colleague Ronald Maggs and others.

In 1956 Rice moved to Hellingly Hospital in Hailsham, another large psychiatric hospital in Sussex, as Medical Superintendent, where he remained for the rest of his career. He wrote a history of the hospital after it closed in 1994.

== Cricket career ==
Rice played cricket, as a medium-pace bowler and lower-order batsman, well into his fifties. Aside from club cricket he played numerous games for the Royal Navy, two non-first-class matches for Sussex in 1945, and one match in 1946 for Norfolk in the Minor Counties Championship.

Rice made his first-class debut at the age of 46 years and 95 days (the oldest first-class debutant in the British Isles since 1924) when he captained Col. L. C. Stevens' XI against Cambridge University at The Saffrons ground in Eastbourne in July 1960. There were four other first-class debutants in his team, as well as the former England Test captain Len Hutton, aged 44, and the Indian prince and future Test player Indrajitsinhji. Rice was also captain in the corresponding match in 1961, when his team included the current Test player Tom Graveney and the 49-year-old Sussex veteran George Cox. His two first-class matches were the only first-class matches played by Col. L. C. Stevens' XI.

== Personal life ==
Rice's father, also called David Rice (1871–1935), was the medical superintendent of Hellesdon Hospital, a large psychiatric asylum near Norwich. Rice had an elder sister, Evelyn, and a younger brother, Hugh, who was also a physician and first-class cricketer. David Rice Hospital, in Drayton, a suburb of Norwich, which operated from 1937 to about 2005, was named after their father.

Rice was married twice: he and his first wife Joan had four children; after she died he married his second wife, Mary, who survived him. They lived in The Elms in the village of Ringmer in East Sussex. He died in Brighton in 1997 at the age of 83.
