= Ronald Rice =

Ronald Rice may refer to:

- Ronald L. Rice (1945–2023), American politician in the New Jersey State Senate
- Ronald C. Rice (born 1968), his son, American politician in Newark, New Jersey
- Ron Rice (Charles Ronald Rice, 1935–1964) was an American experimental filmmaker
- Ron Rice (American football) (born 1972), American football player
- Ron Rice (footballer) (Ronald Henry Rice, 1923–2011), English footballer
