= Richard Rice =

Richard Rice may refer to:

- Richard Rice (athlete) (1886–1939), British track and field athlete
- Richard Rice (theologian) (born 1944), Seventh-day Adventist theologian and author
- Richard H. Rice (1863–1922), American mechanical engineer and inventor
- Richard P. Rice, 19th century Newfoundland merchant, politician and magistrate

== See also ==
- Ricky Rice (born 1951), American wrestler
