= David Leo Rice =

American novelist

David Leo Rice is an American novelist and short story writer known for his surreal and darkly comic fiction. Originally from Northampton, Massachusetts, Rice is based in New York City.

Rice is the author of the Room in Dodge City trilogy; novella The PornME Trinity; standalone novels Angel House, The New House, and The Berlin Wall; and short story collection Drifter: Stories and The Squimbop Condition. He also coedited nonfiction anthology Children of the New Flesh about the early work of filmmaker David Cronenberg. His writing has appeared in The Believer,The Rumpus, Hobart, Electric Literature, The Collagist, Southwest Review, and elsewhere. Rice also co-hosts the "Wake Island" podcast.

After graduating from Harvard, Rice received a DAAD fellowship to spend a year in Berlin, during which he began work on what would become his first novel. He subsequently relocated to New York, where he has been based while writing and publishing fiction across a range of small and independent presses. His primary publisher has been 11:11 Press, a Minneapolis-based independent press. His novels The New House and The Berlin Wall were published by Whiskey Tit.

Critics have compared Rice's style to authors William S. Burroughs, Samuel Beckett, and Flann O'Brien. Heavy Feather Review described his work as "singularly weird fiction about the experiences of artists and drifters wandering hallucinatory landscapes." A central concern across his books is the tension between artistic ambition and corruption, particularly as embodied by figures of the art world and itinerant con men.
