= Thomas Rice =

Thomas or Tom Rice may refer to:

== Politics ==
- Thomas Rice (Massachusetts politician, born 1654) (1654–1747), Massachusetts colonial legislator and founder of Westborough, Massachusetts
- Thomas Rice (Massachusetts politician, born 1734) (1734–1812), Massachusetts state legislator and judge, grandson of the above
- Thomas Rice (Massachusetts politician, born 1768) (1768–1854), U.S. representative from Massachusetts, son of the above
- Tom Rice (born 1957), U.S. representative from South Carolina
- Tom Rice (Georgia politician), American politician, member of the Georgia House of Representatives

== Others ==
- Thomas D. Rice (1808–1860), American performer in minstrel shows
- W. Thomas Rice (1912–2006), American railroad executive
- Tom Rice (soldier) (1921–2022), American veteran of World War II
- Thomas Maurice Rice (1939–2024), Irish-American theoretical physicist
- Thomas O. Rice (born 1960), United States federal judge
- Tom Rice (film historian) (born 1979), British film scholar

== See also ==
- Thomas Spring Rice (disambiguation)
- Tom Reiss (born 1964), American author, historian, and journalist
