= Justice Rice =

Justice Rice may refer to:

- James A. Rice (b. 1957), associate justice of the Montana Supreme Court
- John Campbell Rice (1864–1937), associate justice of the Idaho Supreme Court
- Nancy E. Rice (b. 1950), chief justice of the Colorado Supreme Court
- Philip L. Rice (1886–1974), associate justice of the Supreme Court of Hawaii
- Richard D. Rice (1810–1882), associate justice of the Maine Supreme Judicial Court
- Samuel Farrow Rice (1816–1890), associate justice of the Alabama Supreme Court

== See also ==
- Judge Rice (disambiguation)
