= Helix Human Services =

US non-profit organization

Helix Human Services, which started in 1865 as Springfield Home for Friendless Women and Children and was later known as The Children's Study Home, is an organization based in Springfield, Massachusetts. It is the oldest nonprofit in Western Massachusetts. At the time of its inception, Helix addressed women's issues, family welfare, emotional rehabilitation, and child development at the end of the American Civil War era.

== History ==
=== 1860s-1880s ===
On April 27, 1865, the organization received its incorporation from the Commonwealth of Massachusetts. Its first president was Rachel Capen Merriam. A “well built and commodious house” on Union Street was purchased. According to Article 2 of the 1865 Constitution, the “object of this institution shall be to provide a temporary home for friendless and destitute women and children; and to give them employment and instruction with the ultimate design of providing for them a more permanent situation, or fitting them to maintain themselves”. At the end of its first year in March 1866, forty women and twenty children had received services from the Home for Friendless Women and Children.

In 1868, the Massachusetts Legislature was asked to allocate $2,000 to the organization, which was granted with the provision that the community in Springfield provide a match of funds through private donations. The community raised $2,123.91 along with more tangible donations such as flour and clothes. The home came to be known as Springfield's first public charity.

In 1870, after outgrowing the Union Street home, and after the donations of many, a new additional facility was constructed on Buckingham Street, a Children's Home, and its grand opening was in May 1871. The first school was established in 1873. The Union Street home then had the space needed for women.

Around 1872 Rachel Capen Merriam transferred leadership to a new President, Mrs. William Rice.

=== 1890s–1960s ===
During the following decades and into the new century, the troubles of society commanded growth of facilities and growth of donations. In 1897, a home on Williams Street opened, a Home for Women, and an addition to the Buckingham Street home was added. By 1926 the structure on Buckingham Street was demolished due to structural condition. The Sherman Street address was added in November 1928 at St. Peter's Rectory. The Williams Street facility became known as the only home for unwed mothers in the city. At this point, the managerial structure of the corporation had been divided into three divisions with Mrs. Edward Bradford chairing the William Street committee, Mrs. Frederick Everett chairing the Buckingham Street committee, and Mrs. Robert Cooley chairing the newly created Sherman St. Committee.

The cottage was opened in 1935. Eventually a third building was added to Sherman Street to house administration, laundry, and staff.

Due to findings of the Council of Social Agencies, the Home for Unmarried mothers was closed in 1938. The corporation would now focus exclusively on children's needs. The Home at this time was providing temporary care for youngsters facing some type of disruption in their family life. In 1940, the United Fund and the Community Council asked the Home to consider a different program for emotionally disturbed boys and girls up to age 12. This was accepted and that work began. At this time, the agency became known as The Children's Study Home to reflect the diagnostic and treatment work we pioneered for children with emotional and behavioral problems.

By 1959, it became necessary to address the Home's mission and future direction due to decline in admissions. The board voted in 1961 to accept recommendations for a treatment oriented institution for emotionally disturbed boys and girls ages 6 to 12. In addition, the recommendation called for a foster home program followed by a group home arrangement for children ready to re-enter the community.

On February 28, 1966, the Kathleen Thornton School, named after the director of the agency from 1940–1960 opened as a school to educate youngsters not able to function in public school.

=== 1970s–2020s ===
The agency was again expanded in 1976 to include treatment of teenagers facing emotional challenges. By 1979 a campus in the Sixteen Acres neighborhood of Springfield was acquired to meet the special needs of this program. The Mill Pond School houses a middle school for grades 6–8 and a high school, grades 9–12. It includes academic, administrative and recreational components, and in 2001 added SHARP 1, an adolescent residential program.

The Children's Study Home began providing services for Cape Cod and the Islands in 1993 with a focus on adolescent and family services and today has expanded to provide additional services for youth and families. In 2017 the Home helped to open a wilderness rehabilitation facility on Penikese Island in Buzzards Bay, off the southern coast of Massachusetts.

In 2015 the organization began managing the Curtis Blake Day School, a Springfield school for disabled students previously run by American International College. In early 2022 the organization closed the school, citing low staffing; it was taken over by the Center for School Crisis Intervention and Assessment in Holyoke.

In 2023, the Children's Study Home was renamed to Helix Human Services.

== Sources ==
- Gagnon, Frances (1990)125 Years The Children's Study Home, Founded as The Springfield Home For Friendless Women & Children
