= Isaac Rice =

Isaac Rice may refer to:

- Isaac Rice (businessman) (1850–1915), German-born Jewish American businessman, author, and chess patron
- Isaac Rice (footballer) (born 2000), English footballer
- Isaac J. Rice (1808–1880), minister and missionary for fugitive slaves from the United States
