= Mary Berenice Rice =

Catholic nun and psychologist

Sister / Mother Mary Berenice Rice O.S.U.
- Born: Mary Frances Rice; November 13, 1902
- Died: December 29, 1991 (aged 89); New Rochelle, New York
- Other names: Mary Berenice Rice, Mary Frances Rice, Mary F. Rice, Sister Berenice Rice, O.S.U., Mother Berenice Rice, & M. Berenice Rice
- Citizenship: USA
- Education: College of New Rochelle (B.A.); Fordham University (M.A.); Catholic University of America (Ph.D.)
- Occupations: Psychologist, Catholic nun, Educator
- Years active: 1924–1991
- Employer(s): College of New Rochelle; Fordham University; International Federation of Catholic Universities
- Known for: Founder, psychology department, College of New Rochelle; International Federation of Catholic Universities (IFCU) delegate to the United Nations

Mary Berenice Rice (born Mary Frances Rice; (Note: Her name is alternatively given in differing sources as: Mary Berenice Rice, Mary Frances Rice, Mary F. Rice, Sister Berenice Rice, O.S.U., Mother Berenice Rice, and M. Berenice Rice.) November 13, 1902 – December 29, 1991) was an American psychologist, Catholic nun, and professor. Rice joined the enclosed religious order of Ursulines in 1925. She obtained her B.A. from the College of New Rochelle, and her M.A. from Fordham University, before earning a Ph.D. from Catholic University.

Rice founded the department of psychology at the College of New Rochelle, and headed it for 25 years. She subsequently became a professor and dean at Fordham University. After her retirement from academia, she became the delegate of the International Federation of Catholic Universities (IFCU) to the United Nations.

== Early life and education ==
Rice was born on November 13, 1902. Rice's family included her sister Eleanor Rice Saunders, and brothers Leo Rice and James O. Rice. Rice completed high school at the institution, Mount St. Mary-on-the-Hudson in 1920, where she garnered the award, Gold Medal for Christian Doctrine. She graduated from the College of New Rochelle in 1924. Rice joined the Order of Saint Ursula and gained the post-nominals O.S.U. in 1925. The same year she joined the order, she wrote a piece for The Catholic Transcript, outlining the history of her fellow Urulines who had died in France, during the Reign of Terror. In 1928, she was hired by her former school, the College of New Rochelle, as an English teacher. She obtained her Master of Arts degree from Fordham University, in 1932. She was supervised during her Master's degree level studies, by professor James J. Cronin. Her master's thesis was titled, Vocational Interests of College Women: A Study of 100 Students of the College of New Rochelle.

She studied psychology at the Catholic University of America, where her dissertation was entitled, Diagnosis of the Mental Hygiene Problems of College Women By Means of Personality Ratings, and published as a monograph in 1937. Rice was elected as an associate of the American Psychological Association in September 1937. She garnered a Doctor of Philosophy from the Catholic University of America in 1938. Rice's doctoral level findings on mental health of students and personality ratings was cited in psychiatric academic analysis, including studies by psychiatrist Thomas Verner Moore on behavioral patterns and precursors to psychotic personality indicators. In 1939, she presented alongside Arthur H. Moehlman in Milwaukee, Wisconsin, at the meeting of the American Association for the Advancement of Science (AAAS). Their research efforts were publicized in the journal, Science. Her research was featured in the journal, Review of Educational Research, in their "Bibliography on Mental Hygiene and Health Education".

== Academic career ==
=== College of New Rochelle psychology department ===
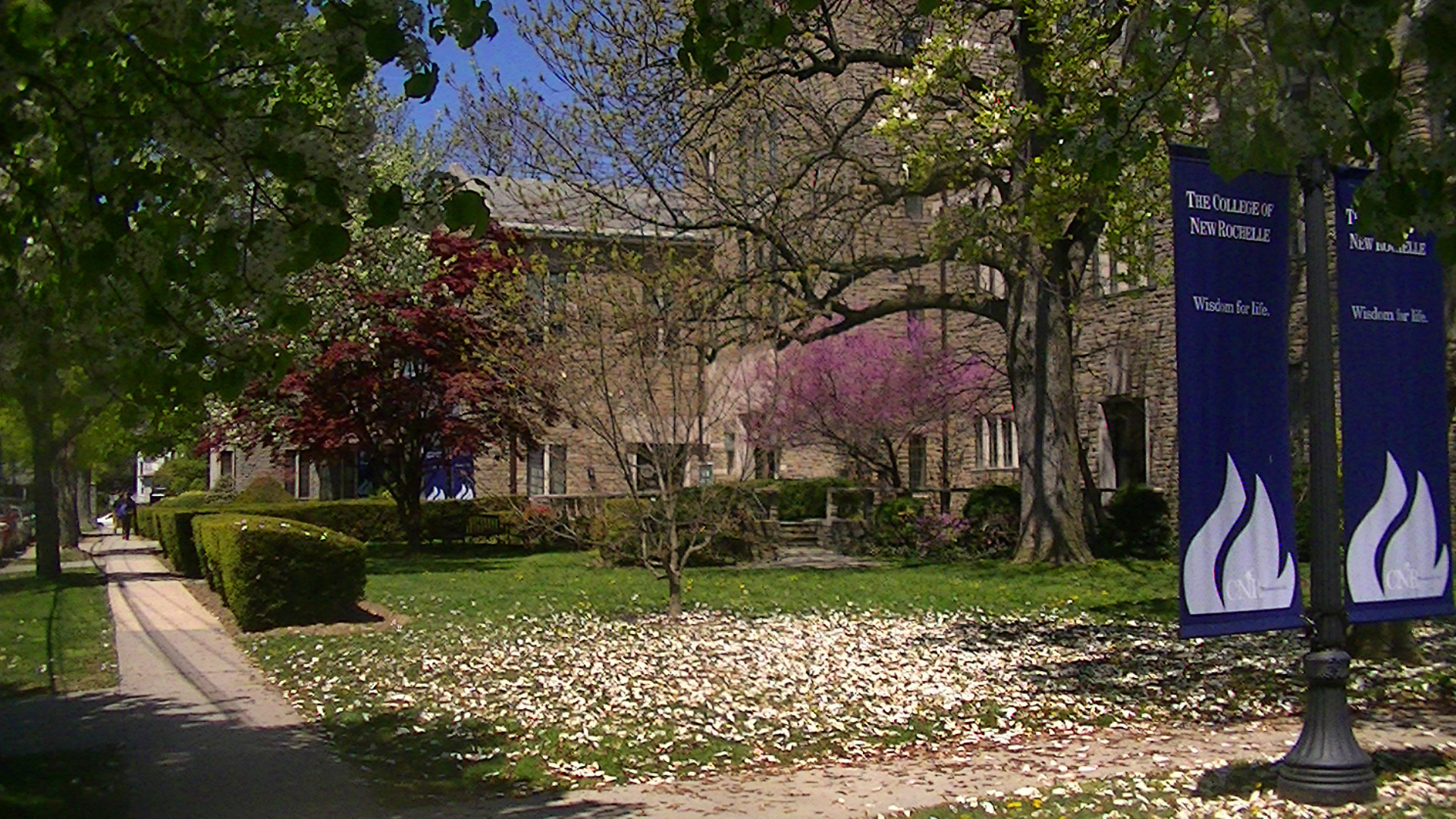
Mary Berenice Rice founded the psychology department at the College of New Rochelle.

After successfully obtaining her Ph.D., she returned to the College of New Rochelle, where she launched their department of psychology. She served as chief of the psychology division at the College of New Rochelle, from 1942 through 1967. While there in her capacity as professor, she founded the Child Study Center at the school, in 1941. Activities for the children in the program took place in the Life Science Building at the college. The program was both an area to care for and educate three and four-year-old children, and to serve as a place for child psychology students at the college to gain direct experience with youngsters. The Child Study Center she founded took in children of varying degrees of intellect and intellectual disability. It featured a diverse population, with children coming from homes with Spanish, French, Japanese and Polish language speakers. In 1950, she was selected as a trustee of the College of New Rochelle. She served in the role of director of college development in 1957. She represented the college in the same year, at a meeting of the Empire State Foundation of Independent Liberal Arts Colleges. Rice collaborated with colleague, M. Therese Charles, in a presentation to alumni of New Rochelle College in May 1957. She discussed the institution's future needs, and formally launched the college's first ever significant fundraising initiative.

In 1960, Rice presented on the topic of education before the National Council on Family Relations. She explained to the panel and attendees about how family life classes were taught in the Catholic school system more broadly, and at the College of New Rochelle itself specifically. The panel discussion featured international educators, teachers, and management leaders within the subject. After the talk, the National Council on Family Relations received multiple requests for copies of the materials. She continued serving as director of the Child Study Center through 1968.

=== Professor at Fordham University ===
While continuing to hold positions at the College of New Rochelle — Rice became an associate professor of psychology at Fordham University, and taught there from 1967 through 1973. While at Fordham, she became dean of St. Mary's Residence Hall, where she supervised fellow nuns who were undergoing graduate studies at the university. She remained active in the local surrounding community, and served on the Hospitality Committee of an interfaith event in honor of World Community Day put forth by Church Women United (CWU). The event pulled together over 100 people from 30 churches in Pelham and New Rochelle, New York. Representatives came from multiple denominations, including Orthodox, Protestant, and Catholic.

== Retirement, death and legacy ==
Rice entered retirement and left the board of trustees of the College of New Rochelle, in 1978. After an election in 1980, she was elected to an emeritus professor position at the school. In 1980, Rice was appointed as the authorized delegate of the International Federation of Catholic Universities (IFCU) to the United Nations.

In later years, Rice lived at the Marian Residence located in New Rochelle, New York, where she died December 29, 1991, at the age of 89.

The Sister Mary Berenice Rice O.S.U. Award in Psychology was created by the College of New Rochelle in memory of their former psychology professor. It was given to students who showed excellence in their psychology studies at the school.
