= William Rice (1788) =

American politician

Member of the Massachusetts House of Representatives from the Springfield, Massachusetts district
- In office 1831

Personal details
- Born: March 13, 1788 Belchertown, Massachusetts
- Died: February 11, 1868 (aged 79) Springfield, Massachusetts
- Spouse: Jerusha Warriner (m. 1809)
- Children: Cornelia Rice (1813-1842); Jerusha Rice (1817-1866); William Rice (1821-1897); Joseph B. Rice (1828-1829)
- Occupation: Merchant, Public Servant

William Rice (March 13, 1788 – February 11, 1863) was a Massachusetts businessman and public servant, a member of the Massachusetts House of Representatives and a Registrar of deeds and Treasurer for Hampden County, Massachusetts.

== Early life ==
William was born in Belchertown, Massachusetts to Nathan Rice (1760-1838) and Hepzibah Allen (1763-1854). His father, Nathan Rice was born in Sudbury, Massachusetts, the son of John and Thankful Rice. He was a Revolutionary War veteran and a descendant of Edmund Rice. Hepzibah was the daughter of Edmund Allen and Elizabeth Woodward, and a cousin of Ethan Allen. She witnessed the Battle of Concord from her home. In the end of their lives, Nathan and Hepzibah lived in Springfield, Massachusetts. William Rice was raised in Wilbraham, Massachusetts, but spent some time working as a carpenter in New York. He moved to Springfield, Massachusetts in 1818, where he remained for the rest of his life.

== Career ==
In 1810, a William Rice placed an advertisement seeking journeymen to work in his cabinet and shop joiner's business in Wilbraham.

William was originally involved in the mercantile business working with John Holt. He ran the firm Rice & Upham, then worked with Rev. Daniel Dorchester to form Rice & Dorchester, and later with Rev. Dr. Frederick Merrick to form "Rice, Dorchester & Merrick."

He was well liked, and served in many positions including as a justice of the peace. He was elected Register of Deeds for Hampden County in 1830, which he continued for many years. His loss to Democrat James E. Russell in 1858 was considered the most significant result of the local election. Following this defeat, his son in law, Norman Norton also resigned from the post of County treasurer.

In 1838, he was elected County Treasurer, and continued for 15 years. In 1849, he was a member of the Whig Party and ran unopposed. He was elected a town selectman from 1824-1826 and 1830, then a member of the Massachusetts House of Representatives from Springfield in 1831.

== Methodism ==
In 1819, he was one of the founders of the Second Congregational Society in the First Parish in Springfield.

He was a devoted member of the Methodist Episcopal Church, and he contributed to all three Methodist churches in Springfield. Many early church meetings were held at his house. He was one of the founders of Wilbraham Wesleyan Academy, giving it a third of its land, and helping the institution to succeed. He was president of its board for many years.

He was a founder of the Pynchon Street Church in Springfield, which later became the Trinity Methodist Episcopal Church, and later the Trinity United Methodist Church. He is depicted in a stained glass window in the church along with his son's Springfield Library.

== Family life ==
He married Jerusha Warriner (March 15, 1785 - July 20, 1869) on September 17, 1809. She was the daughter of David Warriner and a descendant of William Warriner who settled in Springfield in 1640. Their children were Cornelia Rice (1813-1842), Julia Rice (1817-1866) William Rice (1821-1897), and Joseph Benson Rice (1828-1829). Julia Rice married Norman Norton (1816-1859) and lived in Springfield. Norton served as County Treasurer. William Rice II was a Methodist minister and later longtime Springfield librarian. William Rice and family members are buried in the Springfield Cemetery.

== Genealogy ==
William Rice was a direct descendant of Edmund Rice, an English immigrant to Massachusetts Bay Colony, as follows:

- William Rice, son of

- Nathan Rice (1760–1838), son of
- John Rice (1704–1771), son of

- Ephraim Rice (1665–1732), son of
- Thomas Rice (1625–1681), son of

- Edmund Rice (1594–1663)
