= David Warriner (Wilbraham) =

David Warriner (May 13, 1742 – January 4, 1783) was an early citizen of Wilbraham, Massachusetts, the proprietor of a tavern which later became a part of the Wilbraham Wesleyan Academy.

He was born to David Warriner and Mary Sikes in 1742 in Wilbraham, Massachusetts. He was descended from William Warriner, a founder of Springfield, Massachusetts They lived on a farm in Wilbraham, which was to later become the Wesleyan Academy, and is now Wilbraham and Monson Academy. With William Rice, David Warriner maintained a tavern, which became the original boarding house of the Wilbraham Wesleyan Academy, opened November 8, 1825.

== Family life ==
He married Joanna Moody (~1743-1820) of Hadley, Massachusetts. They had seven children in Wilbraham, four of whom survived into adulthood. The children were Mary Warriner (1772-1774), Joanna Warriner (1774-1776), Jerusha Warriner (1775-1777), David Warriner (1778), Joanna Warriner (1779), Charles Warriner (1782), and Jerusha Warriner (1785). Joanna (1779) married John Rice on December 23, 1802. Jerusha (1785) married Springfield merchant and public servant William Rice on September 17, 1809.
