= Rice brothers =

American brothers, identical twin dwarfs and television personalities

The Rice Brothers
- Born: John Rice; 3 December 1951; Greg Rice; 3 December 1951 (age 74); St. Mary's Hospital, West Palm Beach, Florida, USA
- Died: John Rice; 5 November 2005 (aged 53)
- Cause of death: John Rice; Complications of injuries
- Occupations: Estate agents Investors
- Known for: Shortest living twins (former)
- Height: 2 ft 10 in (86 cm)

John Rice (December 3, 1951 – November 5, 2005) and Greg Rice (born December 3, 1951), sometimes known as the Rice Brothers or Rice Twins, were identical twin dwarfs, known throughout the United States for their appearances in various commercials and infomercials. Until the death of John Rice on November 5, 2005, the two held the world record for being the shortest living twins, standing only 2 ft 10 in (86 cm).

== Early lives ==
John and Greg Rice were born on December 3, 1951, at St. Mary's Hospital in West Palm Beach, Florida. Their biological mother abandoned them a few hours after giving birth, purportedly due to the diagnosis of dwarfism. After eight months of being cared for by hospital staff, the infants were taken in as foster children by Frank and Mildred Windsor. Mildred died when the boys were in eighth grade due to ovarian cancer. Following the loss of their foster mother and the death of their foster father three years later, the two were raised by their foster sister, Betty Windsor. Despite the difficulties of their condition as well as the loss of their foster parents, John and Greg participated in "normal" childhood activities such as the Boy Scouts, took regular classes throughout their education, and even played cornet in the junior high and high school band.

During their senior year at Palm Beach High School, John and Greg made money selling cleaning and personal care products door to door. After a number of years practicing their sales skills the two enrolled in community college, and after a year of school were promoted to training other salespeople in the company they worked for.

== Professional careers ==
In the mid-seventies the Rice Brothers went into the real estate business, starting out as real estate agents and then successful investors. They later went into the motivational speaking business.

In 1980, the brothers appeared in Hardly Working, a comedy directed by Jerry Lewis. The twins appeared on the television series Real People as motivational speakers, and then went on to play landlords in the 1981 television series Foul Play. They also hosted a short-lived game show titled That Awful Quiz Show in 1982. In 1989, the twins appeared in commercials for a chain of pizza restaurants known as Pizza Factory.

In the 1990s, the twins became local celebrities in south Florida when they began starring in commercials for a pest control company.

== Death of John ==
John Rice died November 5, 2005, from complications of injuries when he broke his leg coming out of a Palm Beach bank. He was scheduled for surgery and died as anesthesia was being applied.
