= Eclectic Society (fraternity) =

Fraternity (1838–1970) or its successor co-op at Wesleyan University

- ΦΝΘ
- Founded: September 13, 1838; 188 years ago Wesleyan University
- Type: Cooperative living
- Affiliation: Independent
- Status: Active
- Scope: Local
- Colors: Red and Cream
- Publication: The Eclectic Scroll
- Chapters: 1 active, 3 installed
- Headquarters: 200 High Street; Middletown, Connecticut 06457; United States

The Eclectic Society of Phi Nu Theta (ΦΝΘ) began in 1838 as a college fraternity at Wesleyan University in Middletown, Connecticut, making it one of the earliest college fraternities to be formed in the United States. In 1970, the alumni and active members split. The fraternity sold its chapter house to the university, and the Eclectic organization continued as a co-ed cooperative living space, sharing the building with Wesleyan's dance organization, Movement House. The succeeding co-op dropped the use of Greek letters.

== History ==
The Eclectic society of Phi Nu Theta was founded at Wesleyan University by Jonathan Coe, Clark Titus Hinman, Chester Dormund Hubbard, Herman Merrills Johnson, and Joshua Newhall. The five founders met on September 13, 1838 to elect and initiate themselves. (Chandler Robbins was also elected that night, but was initiated a week later.) The early Wesleyan societies adopted English, rather than Greek, names. However, Eclectic adopted the Greek letters Phi Nu Theta and operated under both names.

The society has always claimed an 1837 foundation for itself, for reasons understood by the members. However, no advocate of the society has refuted the accepted date of the founding meeting, on September 13, 1838. Eclectic was Wesleyan's second fraternity, after the Mystical 7.

In the 1850s, a Beta chapter existed for ten years at Ohio Wesleyan University and a Gamma chapter enjoyed a month's existence at Dickinson College in Pennsylvania, but both succumbed to the perturbations accompanying the Civil War or to anti-fraternity sentiment among faculty members. There were long discussions about a chapter at Genesee College which proved unfruitful. Thereafter, the only chapter was Alpha chapter at Wesleyan University.

As other Greek-letter societies came to Wesleyan, Eclectic did adopt a Greek motto, and has since been known as either Phi Nu Theta or Eclectic, with one or the other dominating different eras.

The society might not have survived the stresses of the Civil War without the tireless dedication of William North Rice, 1865, who was a professor at the university for 51 years and also, from time to time, acting president of the university. He was universally regarded as the guiding spirit of the society through the 1920s.

In 1863, the Eclectic society's meeting place was said to have been vandalized and robbed by rival fraternity Chi Psi, which was shut down the same year.

From about 1856 to 1865, the Eclectic Society was a partner in the Alpha Eating Club with the Mystical 7. After 1865, Eclectics controlled the club exclusively, and the Alpha Eating Club survived until 1975. The alumni organization of Eclectic was incorporated by the Connecticut legislature as the Socratic Literary Society in 1870.

In 1912, at the 75 reunion of the society, Stephen Henry Olin reported in an address that after a detailed analysis of the academic standing of each college fraternity chapter at every major university in America back to the 1820s, Phi Nu Theta had the highest academic ranking of any chapter of any fraternity in the country.

=== 20th century challenges ===
In 1970, the undergraduates broke ranks with their alumni. There is a serious and ongoing question as to whether the succeeding organization was a continuation of the old or not. After the annual meeting in 1970, the alumni severed ties with the undergraduate institution and dissolved the Socratic Literary Society alumni organization.

At the same time, the undergraduates abandoned both the initiation ceremony and the constitution, women were elected to membership, and the name Phi Nu Theta was disavowed as too much like a Greek-letter fraternity. The alumni closed the Alpha Dining Club, the permanent staff (housekeeper and chef) was dismissed, and the house was sold to the university. For some, the new organization was entirely different, and any connection to the older organization was utterly severed; to others, the new organization continued the principles and community position of the old. In recent years, the students living in Eclectic attempted to rebuild connections to the older alumni with events during Homecoming and Family Weekend and Commencement & Reunion Weekend.

Because of the prestige of the older organization, the prominent position played by the succeeding organization in student life, and other factors, the Wesleyan University administration has never pushed the issue of whether the old Eclectic and the new Eclectic were two organizations or one, and for fifty years, the relationship has remained ambiguous.

The existing society has operated without a constitution for extended periods and adopted a Quaker-style consensus decision-making system. The consensus system was formalized under a set of bylaws authored by member Paul Menair in the mid-1980s.

A History of The Eclectic Society of Phi Nu Theta, 1837–1970 was published in 2007 by the Wesleyan University Press. The author, William B.B. Moody, is a member and an alumnus of the class of 1959.

== Symbols ==
The Eclectic Society's badge is a watch key that is shaped like a scroll, bearing the Greek letters ΦΝΘ, the word "Eklektos", and the letter A in star in the upper right corner. The fraternity's magazine, The Eclectic Scroll, was first published in 1926. Its colors are red and cream.

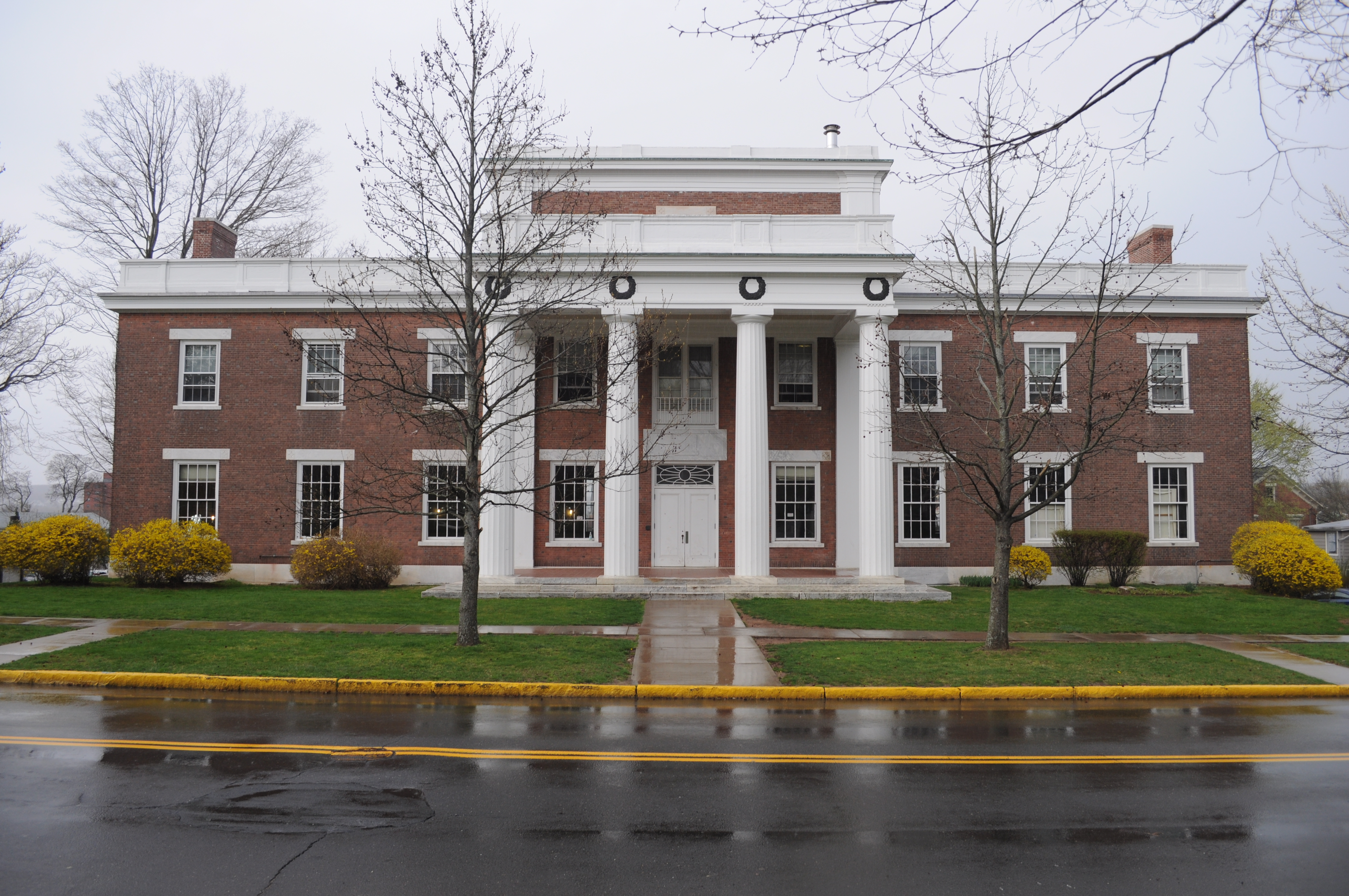
Eclectic Society building, 200 High Street, 2012

== Building ==
The first permanent home for the society was constructed in 1882 on a site behind the Allbriton Center, where Cross Street runs. It had no residential accommodations for undergraduates and was used for meetings, dining facilities, and society offices.

In 1906, the society hired Henry Bacon, formerly of the architectural firm McKim, Mead and White, to design a Doric Greek revival structure at 200 High Street. Bacon was the main architect of the Wesleyan campus. The three-story brick house was completed in 1907. It includes 18 single rooms, 3 double rooms, a ballroom, a living room, a dining room, a kitchen, a library, and a meeting room. The Alpha Eating Club was housed in the lower stories of the southern wing of the house.

Thirteen years after its completion, the house was damaged by a leaking roof. Additional damages occurred in 1925 due to a lightning strike. Its heating system stopped working in 1928. Other problems occurred, continually causing the fraternity to be in debt. By the 1970s, the house was in disrepair. The fraternity's alumni sold the house to Wesleyan University for $1. The university repaired the building and brought it up to code. It is still used for the fraternity's meetings.

The building was listed on the National Register of Historic Places in 2013.

== Notable members ==
Alumni of the old Phi Nu Theta Eclectic include Chester D. Hubbard, a founder of Eclectic, and his son, member William P. Hubbard, both prominent at the founding convention of the State of West Virginia, Frederick W. Pitkin '58, two-term governor of Colorado from 1879, the congressman and banker Frederick M. Davenport, Walter B. Wriston, who presided over the development of modern consumer banking and the ATM while serving as president and CEO of Citibank, now known as Citicorp, and poet Charles Olson.

The list of society alumni also includes several Wesleyan University presidents, including Joseph Cummings 1849, (former president of Genesee College, later president of Northwestern University), Cyrus David Foss 1854, John W. Beach 1845, William North Rice '65 (Acting), Stephen Henry Olin 66 (Acting), John Monroe Van Vleck '50 (Acting), and Edwin Deacon Etherington, 1848.

Alumni of the newer Eclectic include Le1f, Chris Wink, co-founder of Blue Man Group; Amanda Palmer, songwriter and singer of The Dresden Dolls; Ben Goldwasser, Will Berman and Andrew VanWyngarden of the neo-psychedelic band MGMT; Jem Cohen, an independent film maker who has worked with R.E.M. and Fugazi, filmmaker Joss Whedon, Willie Garson, character actor in many movies and TV shows such as Sex and the City and White Collar, Himanshu Suri of the rap group Das Racist, Simon O'Connor of the band Stylophone and Amazing Baby, and Keenan Mitchell and Fareed Sajan of the band Bottle Up and Go.

Many buildings on Wesleyan University's campus are named after prominent Eclectic members, such as Crowell Concert Hall, Olin Memorial Library (Stephen Henry Olin, '65 and his father), Hall and Atwater Labs, the Zilkha Gallery (Ezra Khedouri Zilka, '46 and his wife), and the Van Vleck Observatory, (Astronomy Professor John Monroe Van Vleck).

== In popular culture ==
The script for the film PCU was written by Wesleyan students Adam Leff and Zak Penn (not members but regulars at the house), and was derived from life and characters in that house at the time. The early scenes at the house in PCU refer to the older, formerly prestigious organization.

On January 19, 2010, Eric Conger's play The Eclectic Society premiered at the Walnut Street Theatre in Philadelphia. The play centers on a fraternity at an unnamed New England college in the early 1960s, as they collide with race, class, and gender issues, while a new world prepares to unfold under the JFK administration.
