= William North Rice =

American geologist, educator, and theologian (1845–1928)

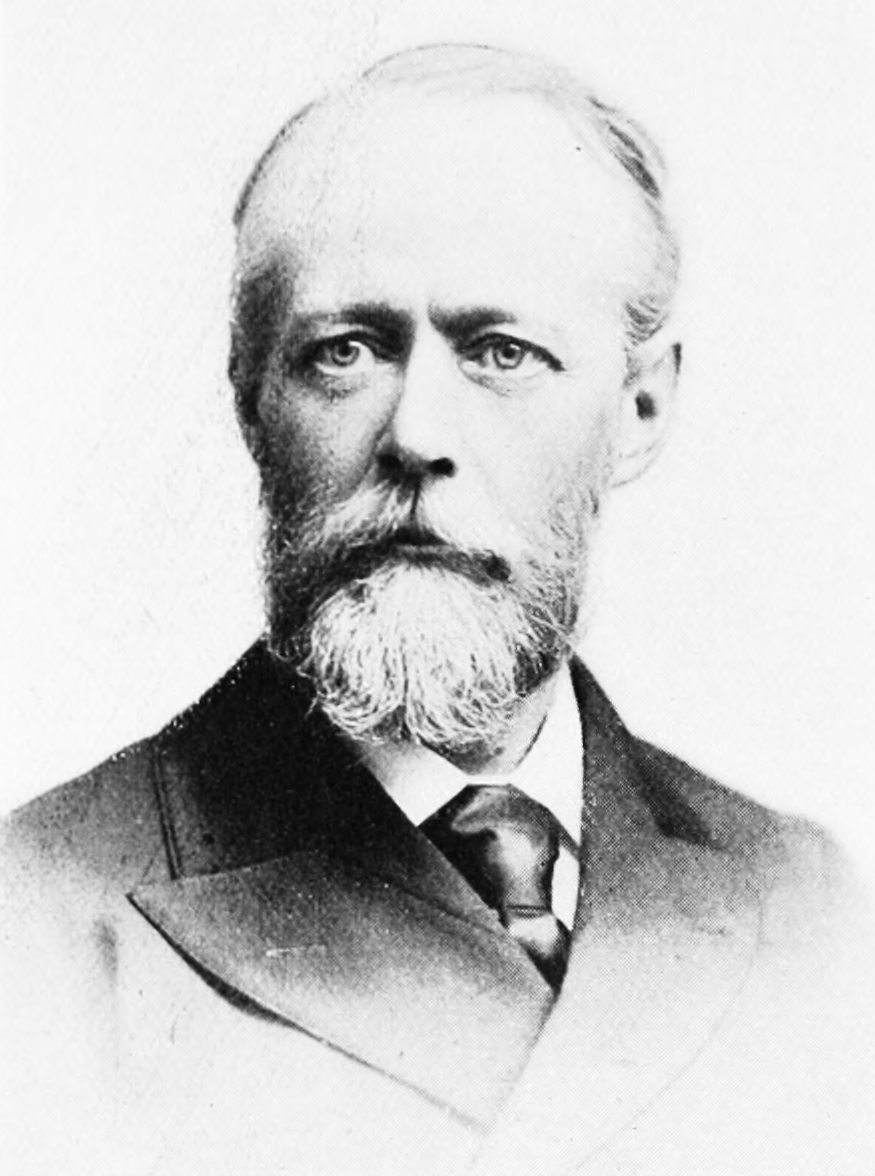
- Born: November 21, 1845; Marblehead, Massachusetts, US
- Died: November 13, 1928 (aged 82); Delaware, Ohio, US
- Education: Wesleyan University; Yale University; Syracuse University
- Known for: Early studies of geology in America; writings on science and religion
- Spouse: Elizabeth Wing Crowell (m. 1870)
- Children: 2, including Edward Loranus Rice
- Parents: William Rice; Caroline Laura North

William North Rice (1845–1928) was an American geologist, educator, and Methodist minister and theologian concerned with reconciliation of science and religious faith.

== Early life and education ==
Rice was born November 21, 1845, in Marblehead, Massachusetts, to the Rev. William Rice and Caroline Laura (North) Rice. He prepared for college at Springfield High School in Springfield, Massachusetts, and graduated in 1865 with a bachelor's degree from Wesleyan University in Middletown, Connecticut, serving as class valedictorian. His interest in religious ministry began early with an invitation to preach at Grace Church in Boston shortly after his graduation in 1865. In 1867 after studies at the Sheffield Scientific School of Yale College, he earned the first PhD in the United States to be awarded in the field of Geology. Upon graduation from Yale, he was offered a faculty position at Wesleyan University, but he opted to undertake post-doctoral studies in Germany for a year at the renowned Institute of Natural History established by Alexander von Humboldt (1769–1859) at the University of Berlin. Later in 1886, he earned a doctor of laws (LL.D.) degree at Syracuse University.

== Academic career ==
Rice served as professor of geology and natural history at Wesleyan beginning in 1868. Early in his career he was ordained as a minister, joining the New England Conference of the Methodist Episcopal Church. During the early 1870s, Rice undertook zoological research work with Spencer Baird at the newly established laboratory of the United States Fish Commission at Woods Hole, Massachusetts. Later in the winter 1876 to 1877, he was part of a major geological and zoological expedition to Bermuda, one of the first expeditions of its type undertaken by American scientists.

In the early 1880s, Rice took an interest in the geology of Europe, traveling for research activities there in 1881 and 1884. He continued further work with European colleagues in an extended trip to Germany from 1892 to 1893, and in later to France in 1900. Beginning in 1891, Rice took an active interest in the geology of the American West, traveling to Yellowstone National Park and other Rocky Mountain locations as part of an international geological expedition. Later in 1904, he conducted research in the Grand Canyon and Mexico, and later in that decade he traveled to Alaska to study the glaciers of Yakutat Bay.

Rice served as an assistant geologist with the U.S. Geological Survey, mapping the geological features of Connecticut. Later from 1903 to 1918, he served as Superintendent of the State Geological and Natural History Survey of Connecticut.

In addition to his scientific studies, Rice took a keen interest in issues of science and religion. He was a lecturer on the relations of religion and science at the Hamilton Theological Seminary at Colgate University between 1897 and 1900. Throughout his career he wrote a number of landmark articles and books on the reconciliation of science with religious faith.

Rice was active as an officer within scientific societies. In 1891, he served as the president of the American Society of Naturalists. Later, from 1905 to 1906, he served as the vice president of the American Association for the Advancement of Science, while concurrently serving as the chairman of the Geological Sciences division of that organization. Rice was also active in his local community by serving as a member of the Middletown Board of Education from 1884 to 1891; presiding over the board from 1885 to 1891. Later, from 1902 to 1905, he served as the president of the statewide Connecticut Council of Education. He was a member of the Connecticut Academy of Arts and Sciences.

Rice served as acting president of Wesleyan University on three occasions in 1907, from 1908 to 1909, and again in 1918. Shortly after his last stint as acting president in 1918, he retired from teaching, but continued much of his research and academic work as an emeritus professor. Later in his retirement, he moved to Delaware, Ohio, to live with his son and his family. He died November 13, 1928, in Delaware, Ohio.

== Family life ==
On April 12, 1870, Rice married Elizabeth Wing Crowell, daughter of Loranus Crowell, an official within the New England Conference of the Methodist Episcopal Church. They had two children. Edward Loranus Rice was born on March 18, 1871, and later became a professor of zoology at Ohio Wesleyan University. Charles William Rice was born on September 19, 1879, but died at three years of age.

William and his brother, the Rev. Dr. Charles Francis Rice co-wrote William Rice: A Memorial, a book memorializing their father, the Rev. Dr. William Rice.

== Selected publications ==
- Geology of Bermuda (1884)
- Science Teaching in the Schools (1889)
- Twenty-five Years of Scientific Progress and Other Essays (1894)
- Christian Faith in an Age of Science (1903; second edition, 1904) ISBN 978-0-548-15225-6
- Manual of the Geology of Connecticut (1906), with H. E. Gregory
- Yakutat Bay (1914)
- The Return of Faith and Other Addresses (1916) ISBN 978-0-548-73662-3
- The Poet of Science and Other Addresses (1919) ISBN 978-1-4372-9576-4
- Science and Religion: Five So-Called Conflicts (1925)
- Guide to the Geology of Middletown, Connecticut and Vicinity (1927) Connecticut State Geological and Natural History Survey.
