= Descendants of Edmund Rice (colonist) =

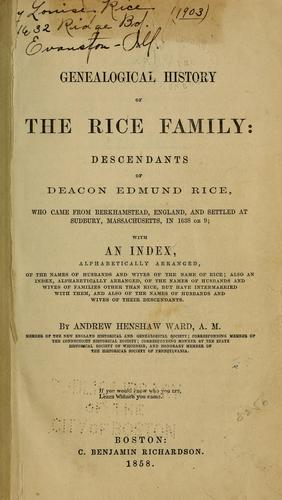
Title page to Andrew Henshaw Ward's A Genealogical History of the Rice Family: The Descendants of Deacon Edmund Rice, financed by members of the Rice family and published in 1858.

This is a list of descendants of Edmund Rice, a noted colonial settler.

In 1638, Rice immigrated to the Massachusetts Bay Colony with his kin, where he became a founder of both Sudbury, Massachusetts, and Marlborough, Massachusetts.

== A ==
- Géraldine Margit Virginia Olga Mária Apponyi de Nagyappony (1915–2002), Queen of Albania
- Desiderio Alberto Arnaz IV (born 1953), actor and musician, son of Lucille Ball and Desi Arnaz
- Lucie Désirée Arnaz (born 1951), entertainer and producer; daughter of actors Lucille Ball and Desi Arnaz

== B ==
- Frederick Henry Ball (1915–2007), movie studio executive, actor, and brother of comedian Lucille Ball.
- Lucille Désirée Ball (1911–1989), actress, comedian, television personality, and studio executive Desilu Productions
- Donald Clinton Barton (1889–1939), geophysicist and pioneering petroleum geologist
- George Hunt Barton (1852–1933), geologist, educator, explorer of Greenland with Robert E. Peary
- Asa Brigham (1788–1844), signer of Texas Declaration of Independence, Texas treasurer, Austin mayor
- Carl Campbell Brigham (1890–1943), controversial pioneer of psychometrics, known for creating the Scholastic Aptitude Test
- Elbert Sidney Brigham (1877–1962), U.S. Congressman from Vermont
- Elijah Brigham (1751–1816), Massachusetts state representative and state senator; U.S. Congressman from Massachusetts.
- Mary Ann Brigham (1829–1889), American educator and 8th President (President Elect) of Mount Holyoke College
- Robert Breck Brigham (1826–1900), philanthropist endowing the Robert Breck Brigham Hospital in Boston.
- Carolyn Brown (1927–2025), leading dancer Merce Cunningham Dance Company. Professional dancer, writer, filmmaker, choreographer, educator.
- Joseph Emerson Brown (1821–1894), Governor of Georgia during the U.S. Civil War and U.S. Senator from Georgia
- Joseph Mackey Brown (1851–1932), Two non-consecutive term governor of Georgia implicated in the lynching of Leo Frank; son of Joseph E. Brown
- Catharinus Putnam Buckingham (1808–1888), professor of mathematics and brigadier general in Union Army; grandson of Rufus Putnam
- Edgar Rice Burroughs (1875–1950), author and creator of the Tarzan character
- John Coleman Burroughs (1913–1979), book illustrator and son of Edgar Rice Burroughs

== C ==
- Paul Rice Camp (1919–2012), physicist, academic, and Chief of Materials Research at CRREL
- Miriam C. Camps (1916–1994), economist, author, and State Department official
- George Rice Carpenter (1863–1909), educator and literary scholar
- Margaret Seymour Carpenter (1893–1987), author of the novel Experiment Perilous
- Herman Churchill (1869–1941), educator, genealogist and historian
- Charles Colson (1931–2012), Director of the Office of Public Liaison
- Calvin Coolidge (1872–1933), Thirtieth President of the United States
- Charles Austin Coolidge (1844–1926), Brigadier General
- John Coolidge (1906–2000), businessman and philanthropist from Plymouth Notch, Vermont, and son of President Coolidge

== D ==
- Matthew Paige Damon (born 1970), American actor
- Dorothea Lynde Dix (1802–1887), health care and social reformer
- Allen Stuart Drury (1918–1998), journalist, and winner of the 1960 Pulitzer Prize for Fiction for his novel Advise and Consent
- Alexander Greer Drury (1844–1929), physician, medical educator and medical historian
- Asa Drury (1801–1870), educator and Baptist minister best known as an antebellum abolitionist
- Thomas Drury (1668–1723), Massachusetts colonial legislator

== E ==
- Alexander Rice Esty (1826–1881), 19th-century New England architect
- Constantine Canaris Esty (1824–1912), state representative, state senator and U.S. Congressman from Massachusetts.

== G ==
- Robert Grant (1852–1940), American novelist and probate judge in Massachusetts.

== H ==
- Erastus Otis Haven (1820–1881), Methodist bishop, Massachusetts state senator, and president of three major universities
- Ernest Hemingway (1899–1961), American novelist, short story writer, and journalist; winner of the Pulitzer Prize for Fiction (1953) and Nobel Prize in Literature (1954)
- John James Hollister Jr. (1901–1961) California state senator and grandson of William Welles Hollister
- William Welles Hollister (1818–1886) a California rancher and entrepreneur, namesake of Hollister, California
- Arthur Otis Howe (1871–1951), Vermont state representative and senator
- Elias Howe (1819–1867), inventor of the first practical sewing machine
- Frank Edmund Howe (1870–1953), Vermont state legislator, House speaker, and Vermont lieutenant governor
- Gardner Howe (1759–1854), Vermont state legislator
- Gilman Bigelow Howe (1850–1933), genealogist and president of the National Genealogical Society
- Jonas Howe (1786–1865), Massachusetts state legislator
- Jonas Holland Howe (1821–1898), abolitionist, artist, and Minnesota state legislator
- Marshall Otis Howe (1832–1919), Vermont state legislator
- Simon Herbert Howe (1835–1911), businessman, Massachusetts state legislator and first mayor of Marlborough
- Levi Hubbard (1762–1836), Massachusetts state legislator, U.S. Congressman from Massachusetts (Maine District)

== I ==
- Charles Phillip Ingalls (1836–1902), American pioneer whose life was depicted in the Little House books
- James Harvey Irvine (1867–1947), prominent landowner in Orange County, California; Irvine Ranch

== K ==
- Charles Reuben Keyes (1871–1951), educator, archaeologist and German scholar
- Margaret Naumann Keyes (1918–2015), educator and heritage conservation scholar
- David Sjodahl King (1917–2009), U.S. Congressman from Utah, ambassador
- William Henry King (1863–1949), U.S. Congressman and Senator from Utah

== L ==
- Rose Wilder Lane (1886–1968), writer, political theorist & co-founder of the modern American libertarian movement
- Walter Franklin Lansil (1846–1925), Boston based American artist known for scenes of Venice
- Wilbur Henry Lansil (1855–1897), Boston based American artist and younger brother of Walter Franklin Lansil.
- Mary Ashton (Rice) Livermore (1820–1905), American abolitionist, social activist, and author.

== M ==
- Walter Ralston Martin (1928–1989), Baptist Christian minister and author
- Christopher Meloni (born 1961), American actor.
- Catherine Ann Keyes Miller (1905–1978), music historian, archivist, and educator

== O ==
- Josephine King Olsen (born 1942), 20th Director of the Peace Corps.
- Culbert Levy Olson (1876–1962), California governor 1939–1943; first cousin to U.S. Senator William H. King

== P ==
- Frank Charles Partridge (1861–1943), lawyer, diplomat, and U.S. Senator from Vermont
- William Lyon Phelps (1865–1945), author, radio program host, professor of English literature at Yale University
- Orlando Brunson Potter (1823–1894). businessman, U.S. Congressman from New York
- Persis (Rice) Putnam (1737–1820), wife of U.S. Revolutionary War general Rufus Putnam.

== R ==
- Abbott Barnes Rice (1862–1926), businessman and Massachusetts state legislator
- Alexander Hamilton Rice (1818–1895), industrialist, Boston mayor, Massachusetts governor, and U.S. Congressman
- Alexander Hamilton Rice Jr. (1875–1956), physician, geographer and explorer
- Alexandrea Kawisenhawe Rice (born 1972), contemporary Canadian actress from the Kahnawake Mohawk nation
- Americus Vespucius Rice (1835–1904), banker, brigadier general, U.S. Congressman from Ohio
- Andrew Eliot Rice (1922–2010), American political scientist, founder of Peace Corps and the Society for International Development
- Arthur Wallace Rice (1869–1938), architect from Boston and partner in Parker, Thomas & Rice
- Caleb Rice (1792–1873), attorney; first president of Massachusetts Mutual Life Insurance Company and mayor of Springfield, Massachusetts
- Charles Rice (1787–1863), brigadier general of the Massachusetts Militia and state representative
- Charles Allen Thorndike Rice (1851–1889), publisher, editor and journalist
- Charles Francis Rice (1851–1927), Methodist minister, author
- Edmund Rice (1819–1889), U.S. Congressman from Minnesota
- Edmund Rice (1842–1906), brigadier general and Medal of Honor awardee
- Edward Everett Rice (1847–1924), composer and musical theater producer
- Edward Hyde Rice (1847–1895), American educator from Massachusetts
- Edward Loranus Rice (1871–1960), biologist and university administrator
- Eustace Bond Rice (1871–1938) professor of music theory at New England Conservatory
- Franklin Pierce Rice (1852–1919), publisher, historian and antiquarian
- George Merrick Rice (1808–1894), businessman, steel industry pioneer, Massachusetts state senator
- George Walter Rice (1855–1884), pioneering Canadian photographer and arctic explorer
- George Washington Rice (1823–1856), businessman and founder of Massachusetts Mutual Life Insurance Company
- Harvey Rice (1800–1891), lawyer, publisher, author and Ohio state legislator
- Henry Rice (1786–1867), U.S. military officer, merchant and Massachusetts state legislator
- Henry Freeman Rice (1818-1877), Superintendent of the Carson City Mint and first mayor of Carson City, Nevada
- Henry Mower Rice (1816–1894), U.S. Senator from Minnesota, prominent in its statehood
- Horace Jacobs Rice (1882–1964), Massachusetts lawyer and law school administrator
- Ingraham "Gitz" Rice (1891-1947), Canadian military officer and musical entertainer
- Jacob Rice (1787–1879), New Hampshire state legislator
- James Clay Rice (1828–1864), educator, lawyer and brigadier general
- James Stephen Rice (1846–1939), businessman, rancher & early resident of Tustin, California
- Joel Taylor Rice (aka Joel Ryce-Menuhin), (1933–1998) pianist and Jungian psychologist
- John Asaph Rice (1829–1888), prominent Chicago hotelier & book collector, father of Wallace Rice
- John Richard Rice (1895–1980), Baptist evangelist and pastor.
- Jonas Rice (1672–1753), grandson of Edmund; first permanent English American settler and founder of Worcester, Massachusetts
- Joseph Rice (1638–1711), son of Edmund, Member of the Massachusetts General Court in 1683 and 1698
- Joseph Waldo Rice (1828–1915), American-born entrepreneur and early settler of Barmah, Victoria, Australia.
- Kathleen Creighton Starr Rice (1882–1963), Math professor; trapper; homesteader; first female gold prospector in the Canadian North.
- Lawrence Bridges Rice (1898–1992), architect and tennis champion
- Leon Scott Rice (born 1958), Lieutenant General, U.S. Air Force; Director of Air National Guard and formerly The Adjutant General (TAG) of the Massachusetts National Guard
- Laura North Rice (1920–2004), psychology professor, author
- Lilian Jeannette Rice (1889–1938), architect from San Diego
- Luther Rice (1783–1836), Baptist minister, missionary to India, and educator; founder of George Washington University
- Michael Alan Rice (born 1955), biologist, Rhode Island state legislator
- Ora Ray Rice (1885–1966), dentist, Wisconsin state legislator, Speaker of the Wisconsin State Assembly 1951–54
- Paul North Rice (1888–1967), librarian, reference department director of the New York Public Library
- Percy Fitch Rice (1882–1954), inventor and businessman
- Richard Henry Rice (1863–1922), mechanical engineer and inventor
- Robert Vernon Rice (1924-2020), biochemist and educator
- Rosella Rice (1827-1888), American author contributing to the folklore of John "Johnny Appleseed" Chapman.
- Thomas Rice (1654–1747), grandson of Edmund; Massachusetts colonial legislator and a founder of Westborough, Massachusetts
- Thomas Rice (1734–1812), Massachusetts state legislator, judge, Federalist Party politician
- Thomas Rice (1768–1854), Massachusetts state legislator, U.S. Congressman from Massachusetts (Maine district)
- Victor Moreau Rice (1818–1869), New York State legislator, educator, newspaperman, banker and insurance company executive.
- Wallace deGroot Cecil Rice (1859–1939), author, poet and designer of the Chicago flag
- Willard Wadsworth Rice (1895–1967), silver medalist U.S. hockey player in the 1924 Winter Olympics
- William Abbott Rice (1912–1991), geologist and university professor
- William Rice (1788–1863), Massachusetts businessman and public servant
- William Rice (1821–1897), Methodist minister, librarian
- William Ball Rice (1840–1909), industrialist and president of Rice & Hutchins, Inc.
- William Chauncey Rice (1878–1941), American lawyer, prominent Methodist and editor of Zion's Herald
- William Gorham Rice Jr. (1892–1979) law professor at University of Wisconsin–Madison
- William Gorham Rice Sr. (1856–1945) American government official from Albany, New York
- William North Rice (1845–1928), geologist, Methodist minister and university administrator
- William Whitney Rice (1826–1896), U.S. Congressman from Massachusetts
- George Edmund Royce (1829–1903), businessman and state senator from Vermont

== S ==
- Joan Irvine Smith (1933–2019), businesswoman and philanthropist prominent in Orange County, California.

== T ==
- James Vernon Taylor (born 1948), American singer and songwriter.

== U ==
- William Upham (1791–1853), Vermont state legislator and U.S. Senator from Vermont

== W ==
- Gideon Welles (1802–1878), Secretary of the Navy during the Lincoln and Andrew Johnson administrations.
- Almanzo James Wilder (1857–1949), husband of writer Laura Ingalls Wilder and father of writer Rose Wilder Lane
- Laura Ingalls Wilder (1867–1957), author of Little House on the Prairie

== Z ==
- Leka Zogu (1939–2011), Crown Prince of Albania
- Leka Zogu II (b. 1982), pretender to Albanian throne
