= Paul Rice Camp =

American academic and a professor of physics

Paul Rice Camp (December 29, 1919 – January 9, 2012) was an American academic and a professor of physics at the University of Maine. Camp's research focus lay in solid-state physics. He was particularly interested in the surface growth of ice.

== Early life and education ==
He was born in Middletown, Connecticut, to Professor Burton Howard Camp and Rachel Caroline Rice. His older sister, Miriam Camps (née Camp), was a prominent writer and economist who for many years worked in the U.S. State Department. His uncle, Paul North Rice, was a prominent librarian at the New York Public Library and other institutions.

Upon his graduation from Wesleyan University in 1941, he joined a group of scientists at the Naval Research Laboratory whose work centered on the development of radar. After the United States entered the Second World War, he was commissioned in the Navy while continuing his work at the laboratory.

Camp received his M.A. in Physics from Harvard University in 1947 and received his Ph.D. in Physics from the Pennsylvania State University in 1951.

== Career ==
Early in his career, Camp taught at Reed College and the Polytechnic Institute of Brooklyn. In 1961, Camp departed Brooklyn Polytechnic to become Chief of the Materials Research Branch at the newly created U.S. Army Cold Regions Research and Engineering Laboratory in New Hampshire. While at USA CRREL, as the laboratory is known, Camp was engaged in substantial research regarding the physical properties of ice.

In 1965 and 1966, during a leave of absence from CRREL, he served as a member of the Commission on College Physics (CCP), then headquartered at the University of Michigan. Created through a grant of the National Science Foundation in seeking to improve science education across the country, the 17-member CCP held numerous national conferences, issued many publications, and, most prominently, suggested various aids and revisions in the teaching of college physics.

In 1967, Camp accepted a position at the University of Maine as both Professor and Chair of the Department of Physics. While Chair, he significantly expanded the University's focus on physics by insisting that specialists be hired in a wide variety of sub-fields within the subject. Camp is notable for having established the Ph.D. program in Physics at the University.

He retired from the University of Maine in 1996 and later became a Distinguished Emeritus Professor at the University.

Camp was a longtime member of the American Physical Society, American Association of Physics Teachers, and International Glaciological Society.

== Personal life ==
Camp was married to Polly Ann Newton (1934–2024), a Geneseo native and graduate of Wellesley College, with whom he had three daughters.

Through his mother, Camp was a descendant of the English colonial settler Edmund Rice (1594–1663).
