= Clarence R. Graham =

American librarian (1907–1989)

President of the American Library Association
- In office 1950–1951
- Preceded by: Milton E. Lord
- Succeeded by: Loleta Dawson Fyan

Personal details
- Born: Clarence Reginald Graham; February 28, 1907 Louisville, Kentucky, US
- Died: January 28, 1989 (aged 81) Louisville, Kentucky, US
- Occupation: Librarian

Clarence Reginald "Skip" Graham (February 28, 1907 – January 28, 1989) was a prominent librarian and leader in the profession. He was president of the American Library Association from 1950 to 1951.

Graham was president of the Kentucky Library Association in 1946–1947. He was president of the Southeastern Library Association from 1948 to 1950.

Graham served as director of the Louisville Public Library for 35 years (1942–1977). In 1952, under his leadership, the Louisville Free Public Library became the first public library in the South to open its main library to African Americans. He became a national figure in the 1950s when he and the Mayor of Louisville, Kentucky, Charles Farnsley, made the public library a model for communities nationwide. Their partnership included a library-based radio station (WFPL) in 1950; concerts and university lectures in the libraries; and 16-mm movies and prints of works of art you could check out. Graham retired in the early 1970s.

Graham was president of the American Library Association during the organization's 75th Anniversary Celebration.

== Publications ==
- Graham, Clarence R. The First Book of Public Libraries. New York: Franklin Watts, 1959.

Non-profit organization positions
| Preceded by Milton E. Lord | President of the American Library Association; 1950–1951 | Succeeded by Loleta Dawson Fyan |
