= Burton Howard Camp =

American mathematician

Burton Howard Camp (September 30, 1880 – March 1, 1980) was an American mathematician and mathematical statistician. For most of his career, he was a professor of Mathematics at Wesleyan.

== Early life and education ==
Burton Howard Camp was born in Hartford, Connecticut, to Howard Alexander Camp and Alice Amelia (Parsons) Camp.

He graduated from Wesleyan in 1901, where he was a member of the Eclectic Society and Phi Beta Kappa. He studied under Professor of English literature, Caleb Thomas Winchester, and gave an address at the Commencement. He earned a B.A. from Harvard in 1903, an M.A. in 1907, and a Ph.D. from Yale in 1911. His thesis was on the Convergence of Singular Integrals and his advisor was James Pierpont.

== Career ==
He taught at Oak Grove Seminary in Vassalboro, Maine, from 1902–1903, was an instructor in Mathematics at the Massachusetts Institute of Technology from 1903–1904, at Wesleyan from 1904–1905, at Harvard from 1906–1907, and again at Wesleyan from 1907–1909. He was named an Associate Professor of Mathematics at Wesleyan in 1909, and a Professor in 1914. He was also chair of the department. He was acting director of the Van Vleck Observatory from 1918–1920. He remained involved with Mathematics at Wesleyan until 1948.

In the early 1920s, Camp switched from analysis to mathematical statistics and spent a year in London studying with Karl Pearson. He was a founder and early President of the Institute of Mathematical Statistics, Vice President of the American Statistical Association, and a member of the American Mathematical Society. Camp was named a Fellow of the American Statistical Association in 1936.

He also served as Secretary of the Wesleyan University Alumni Association.

== Selected publications ==
Burton H. Camp (1913) Singular Multiple Integrals, with Applications to Series, Transactions of the American Mathematical Society, Vol. 14, No. 1 (Jan., 1913), pp. 42-64.

Burton H. Camp (1917) Multiple Integrals Over Infinite Fields, and the Fourier Multiple Integral, American Journal of Mathematics, Vol. 39, No. 3 (Jul., 1917), pp. 311-334.

Burton H. Camp (1924) Probability Integrals for the Point Binomial, Biometrika, Vol. 16, No. 1/2 (May, 1924), pp. 163-171.

Burton Howard Camp (1931) The Mathematical Part of Elementary Statistics New York: D. C. Heath.

Burton H. Camp (1933) Karl Pearson and Mathematical Statistics, Journal of the American Statistical Association, Vol. 28, No. 184 (Dec., 1933), pp. 395-401.

Burton H. Camp (1937) Methods of Obtaining Probability Distributions, The Annals of Mathematical Statistics, Vol. 8, No. 2 (Jun., 1937), pp. 90-102.

Burton H. Camp (1948) Generalization to N Dimensions of Inequalities of the Tchebycheff Type, The Annals of Mathematical Statistics, Vol. 19, No. 4 (Dec., 1948), pp. 568-574.

== Family life ==
He married Rachel Caroline Rice (1889–1978) on June 30, 1915. She was a daughter of the Rev. Charles Francis Rice and Miriam Owen Jacobs. She attended Boston University, and was a member of Gamma Phi Beta sorority, for which she wrote a speech entitled "Knowledge is now no more a fountain sealed."

They had four children: Miriam Rice Camp (1916–1994), Paul Rice Camp (1919–2012), Charles Rice Camp (1924), and Margaret Camp (1926–2021).
