= William Seaman (disambiguation) =

William Seaman (1925–1997) was an American photojournalist.

William Seaman may also refer to:

- William B. Seaman (1875–1910), American football and baseball player and coach
- William Grant Seaman (1866–1944), American Methodist Episcopal minister
- William Henry Seaman (1842–1915), U.S. federal judge

== See also ==
- William Seamon, bridge player
- Bill Seman, CFL player
- William Seaman Bainbridge
