= Harvard-Epworth United Methodist Church =

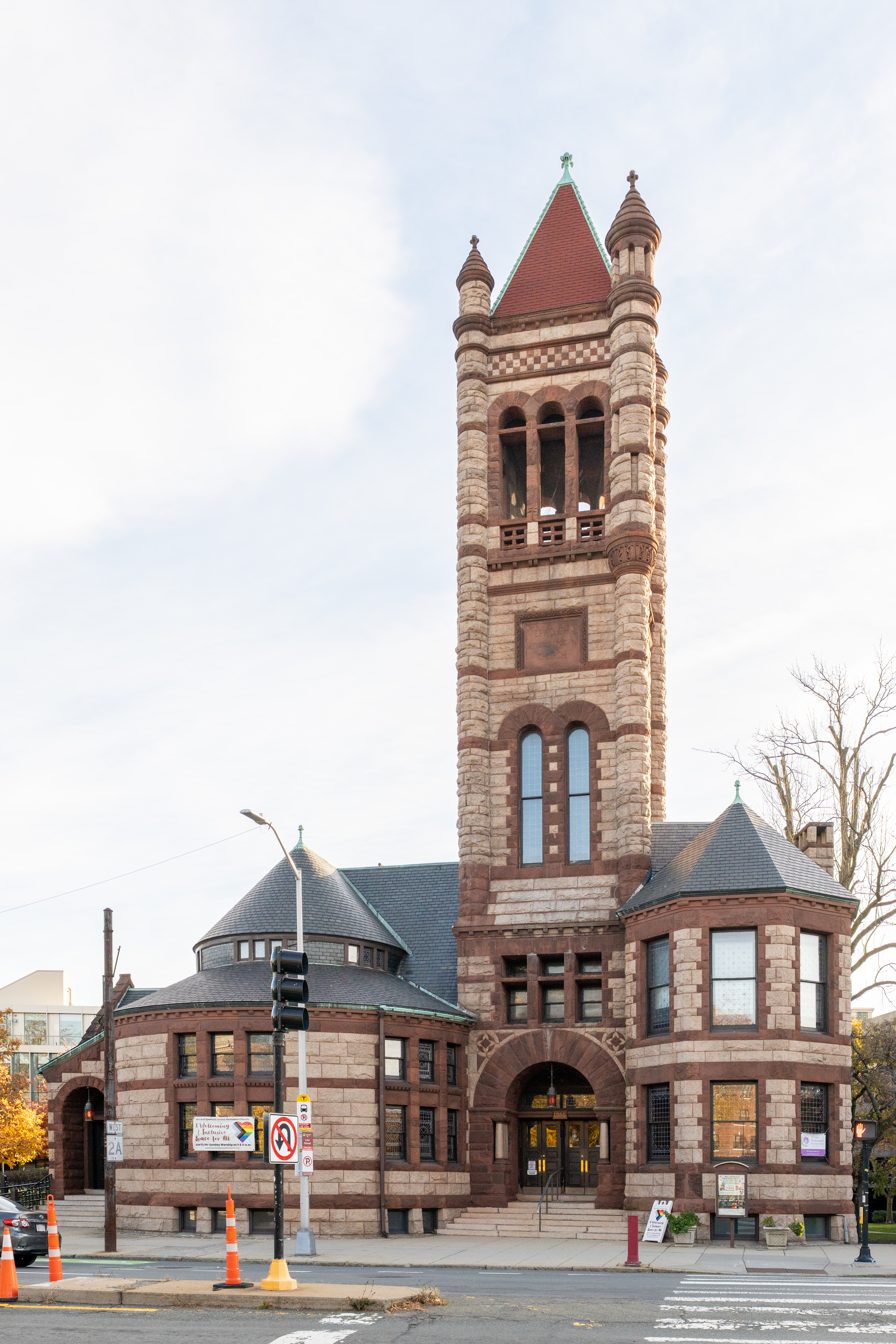
Harvard-Epworth United Methodist Church

The Harvard-Epworth United Methodist Church is a church located beside Harvard Law School near the Cambridge, Massachusetts common. Its congregation was organized in March 1941 by the merger of Harvard Street Methodist Church and Epworth Methodist Church.

The building was designed by Amos P. Cutting of Worcester, Massachusetts in Richardson Romanesque style, and constructed by Cutting and Bishop. Costs were borne primarily by George Bird and philanthropist Frederick Hastings Rindge. Its cornerstone was laid on October 3, 1891, and the church dedicated on February 22, 1893. The structure is built of Southville red granite with East Longmeadow sandstone trimming, and furnished inside with fine wood. Its square, central tower is 110 feet in height and capped with a red, pyramidal roof.

== Ministers ==
- Charles Francis Rice (1893–1898)
- Wilbur Nesbitt Mason (1898–1904)
- William Westley Guth (1904–1905)
