= William Chauncey Rice =

American lawyer

- Born: September 11, 1878; Boston, Massachusetts
- Died: December 16, 1941 (aged 63); Medford, Massachusetts
- Education: Wesleyan University, Yale University, Harvard University
- Occupation: Attorney
- Parent(s): Charles Francis Rice and Miriam Owen Jacobs

William Chauncey Rice (September 11, 1878 – December 16, 1941) was an American academic and lawyer in Boston, Massachusetts.

== Early life and education ==
He was born in Neponset, Boston, the second of five children of the Rev. Charles Francis Rice and Miriam Owen Jacobs. His siblings included Horace Jacobs Rice and Paul North Rice. His middle name comes from his mother's family; his great uncle was a gold prospector named Abijah Chauncey Owen.

He graduated from Wesleyan University in 1901, where he was a member of the Eclectic Society and Phi Beta Kappa. He received an AM in Government from Yale University in 1902, and graduated from Harvard Law School in 1908. Also at Harvard University, He wrote a dissertation entitled "The Decline of the Federalist Party in New England" in 1912. At Harvard, he was a University Scholar in History.

== Career ==
He practiced law in Boston from 1908-1941. He was first with the firm, Tyler & Young, and then with Channing, Corneau & Frothingham. At one point, his office was in the Ames Building.

He was very involved in Methodist affairs in Boston. He was director and vice president of the Boston Wesleyan Association, which published the Zion's Herald magazine. He was also a member of the board of the Wilbraham Academy, President of the New England Methodist Historical Society, and secretary of the New England Education Society. He was also a member of the Twentieth Century Club, the Boston City Club, and a trustee and treasurer of the Wellington Methodist Church in Medford, MA. In 1911, he lived in Newton, Massachusetts.

His funeral was held at the Wellington Methodist Church in Medford, and his burial was in his family plot in the Springfield Cemetery in Springfield, MA.

== Genealogy ==
William Chauncey Rice was a direct descendant of Edmund Rice, an English immigrant to Massachusetts Bay Colony, as follows:

- William Chauncey Rice, son of

- Charles Francis Rice (1851–1927), son of

- William Rice (1821–1897), son of

- William Rice (1788–1863), son of
- Nathan Rice (1760–1838), son of
- John Rice (1704–1771), son of

- Ephraim Rice (1665–1732), son of
- Thomas Rice (1625–1681), son of

- Edmund Rice (1594–1663)
