= Paul North Rice =

American librarian

President of the American Library Association
- In office 1947–1948
- Preceded by: Mary U. Rothrock
- Succeeded by: Errett Weir McDiarmid

Personal details
- Born: February 9, 1888 Lowell, Massachusetts, US
- Died: April 16, 1967 (aged 79) Middletown, Connecticut, US
- Spouse: Genevieve Briggs (m. 1924)
- Children: 4
- Parents: Charles Francis Rice; Miriam Owen Jacobs
- Education: Wesleyan University; New York State Library School
- Occupation: Librarian

Military service
- Branch/service: United States Army
- Rank: Second Lieutenant

Paul North Rice (February 9, 1888 – April 16, 1967) was an American librarian who served as Chief of the Reference Department of the New York Public Library, Executive Secretary of the Association of Research Libraries and President of the American Library Association.

== Early life and education ==
He was born in 1888 in Lowell, Massachusetts, the fourth of five children of the Rev. Dr. Charles Francis Rice and Miriam Owen Jacobs. His grandfather, the Rev. Dr. William Rice was the director of the Springfield City Library Association from 1861 to 1897. While he was a child, his father held pastorates in Leominster, Cambridge and Springfield, Massachusetts. For some time, he resided on Newtonville Ave in Newton, Massachusetts. His mother died in 1901, when he was 13 years old.

He studied at Wesleyan University, where he was a member of the Eclectic Society and Phi Beta Kappa. In the fall of 1906, he won fifth place in the freshman class strength test. While a student, he wrote an English essay on Robert Louis Stevenson. He was the recipient of the Peirce Prize in Natural Science in 1909. At his graduation in 1910, he delivered a speech on "Universal Peace." Some of his words were printed in The Boston Globe:

Man is a fighting animal, but he is also a child of the eternal God. As the ages have gone by, man has shown less of his animal nature and more of his divine kinship. But we are still continuing practices as nations which we have long outgrown as individuals. At present there is an increasing feeling against war. If universal peace ever comes, it will be as a result of international arbitration and limitation of armaments. In such a movement, some great nation must take the lead and in this particular movement no nation is better fitted or as well fitted to take the lead as the United States.

He then studied at the New York State Library School at Albany, graduating in 1912. He witnessed the aftermath of a fire at the New York State Library in 1911.

== Career ==
=== Early career and Military service ===
Rice was a reference assistant in the Ohio State University Library from 1911-1913. During this time, he helped move the a library from Orton Hall into a new building. He was a delegate for Wesleyan at the first annual conference of the Association of Alumni Secretaries at Ohio State University in 1913.

He worked as a reference assistant at the New York Public Library from 1914-1917 and served as treasurer of the New York Library Association from 1916-1917.

He served in the United States Army during WWI, rising from Private to Second Lieutenant. He enlisted on November 20, 1917 at Fort Slocum. He was discharged on September 12, 1918 in order to accept a commission as an officer. He was also stationed at Madison Barracks ROTC Camp. He served in the Quartermaster Corps at Camp Meigs, Washington, D.C.

=== Post-WWI New York ===
After the war, he was a lecturer in the New York State Library School from 1919-1920, before becoming Chief of the New York Public Library Accessions Division in 1920. He served as Chief of the NYPL Preparation Division from 1920-1927. He was treasurer of the New York Library Club in 1922. He gave a report at the 1924 ALA Annual Meeting in Saratoga Springs, New York, entitled "The Cost of Cataloging; a plan for an investigation."

=== Dayton Public Library ===
He was Librarian (director) of the Dayton Public Library in Dayton, Ohio from 1927-1936. He was the First Vice President of the New York State Library School Association in 1928. He served as president of the Ohio Library Association from 1930–31 and chairman of its legislative committee from 1931-1935. In fall 1931, Rice visited 43 large university, public, and reference libraries throughout the East Coast and Midwest as liaison for a special ALA committee examining cataloging and the systems at the Library of Congress.

In 1933, he was the Chairman of the American Library Association Activities Committee. In 1935, he received an honorary Master of Arts from Wesleyan University, 25 years after his graduation. During his tenure in Dayton, he confronted funding challenges as a result of the Great Depression. He was a member of the Ohio Subcommittee in a 1934 Report on the Public Works of Art Project.

In 1934, he gave a talk on the value of the public library for the Piqua Lions Club at the Congregational Christian Church in Piqua, Ohio.

He also corresponded with W. E. B. Dubois regarding his magazine, The Crisis. He was posthumously elected into the Ohio Library Council Hall of Fame in 1980.

In 1948, Rice told Marj Heyduck "I voice the pious hope that Dayton will someday vote a new library." This was something that he had been recruited to do but had not been possible during his tenure. He remarked that while he was unable to build the library, "I went out there with a wife and no children. And left with a wife and four children!"

=== New York University Libraries ===
Rice returned to New York to serve as the first Director of the New York University Libraries in 1936. This included the Gould Memorial Library at University Heights, the Washington Square Library, NYU's Medical, Dental, Commerce, and Wall Street Division libraries, and the Nassau College Library. At the time, there were 500,000 volumes in the university system. Rice wrote a history of the Eclectic Society for its centennial in 1937.

Rice played an active role in the 1937 Annual Conference of the American Library Association in New York City. He was chairman of the Library Buildings Round table and the Salaries, Staff and Service Committee, and co-chairman of a round table of College Librarians. Rice was appointed by New York Governor Herbert H. Lehman to serve as a delegate at the Annual Conference of the American Library Association in Kansas City, Missouri in 1938.

=== New York Public Library ===
In 1938, Rice returned to the New York Public Library, to serve as the Director of the Reference Department (a position now called the Director of Research Libraries). During this time he served as president of the New York Library Association from 1939-1940, Executive Secretary of the Association of Research Libraries from 1942–46 and president of the American Library Association from 1947-48. He was also an instructor at the Columbia University School of Library Service, and a fellow of the American Library Institute.

In 1939, Rice was elected to the executive board of the Society for the Libraries of New York University.

Rice was involved with the Farmington Plan during World War II, working with Waldo Gifford Leland, Archibald MacLeish, Milton E. Lord and Keyes Metcalf. He was also in charge of securing rare books in the event of an air raid at the New York Public library. He was a board member of the Victory Book Campaign.

During the war, Rice corresponded with novelist Frederic Dannay, creator of the Ellery Queen pseudonym. He also corresponded with an Italian prisoner of war, held in New York, who requested the text of the Geneva Convention.

In 1942, Rice received a letter from Franz Boaz, regarding compensation for Roman Jakobson. Also in 1942, he wrote sent a check for .40c to the Association of Research Libraries, and wrote that "he was tempted to send .80c to cover 1943 as well."

In 1944, Rice wrote to Robert M. Lester, Secretary of the Carnegie Corporation in regards to a request about a book supposedly published by Joel Augustus Rogers in 1927. Rice's investigation found no indication that the book was published in 1927; it had only been mentioned in Rogers' entry in "Who's Who in Colored America."

In 1946, Rice was involved in a national committee purchasing books from Germany, many of which would end up at the New York Public Library. He bought $275,000 worth of books from Europe and Asia in 1946.

In 1947, he wrote an article entitled "Has the Association of Research Libraries Proved Worth While?" He also attended the American Library Association Conference in Chicago, and apparently an event in Dayton in that year.

In 1948, Rice received 34 Admiralty charts of the U.S. East Coast at the time of the American Revolution, presented by the British Consul General in New York, Sir Francis Evans. Also in 1948, he was a guest of honor at the annual meeting of the Poetry Society of America.

In 1949, Rice gave a collection of 26,000 items from the library to the New York Academy of Medicine

In 1950, he was a signer of a petition to the New York Board of Education to lift the ban on The Nation from public schools.

In 1951, he was granted a Public Librarian's Professional Certificate from the University of the State of New York Education Department. Also in this year, he corresponded with French ethnologist, Paul Rivet. He also corresponded with Gustav Davidson regarding collections from the Poetry Society of America.

Also in 1951, the Women's Division of Christian Service of the Methodist Church presented Rice with the book, States' Laws on Race and Color, edited by Pauli Murray. He commented that "the best thing about the book was that it would soon become out-of-date, as forward strides were being made very rapidly in race relations legislation."

He is listed as having attended the dedication of the new library at the University of Iowa in 1952.

In 1952, along with Lloyd A. Brown of the Peabody Institute, William A. Jackson of Harvard, and Clifford K. Shipton of the American Antiquarian Society, he was invited to examine the Library Company of Philadelphia and make recommendations on its future.

Also in 1952, Rice was one of five original members of the Alumni Advisory Committee of the Columbia University School of Library Service. The Columbia School of Library Service was the continuation of the New York State Library School at Albany.

In October 11, 1953, he apparently visited Madison Avenue Presbyterian Church.

Rice also corresponded with accused spy Philip Keeney, expressing disapproval of his actions. He wrote "I have no sympathy with any censorship of books in a college library which stress a different point of view than that of the administration, but neither have I sympathy, and I assume that with this you will concur, with using a college library for propaganda (Sic)."

He supported the efforts of UNESCO. In a speech as President of the ALA, Rice spoke of the role of libraries in a Cold War context: "our libraries are one force that assures that the United States can never succumb to fascism or any other kind of totalitarianism, we should do everything we can to influence UNESCO to stimulate such libraries everywhere." He was described by The New York Times as a "Foe of Censorship due to his defense of intellectual freedom during the Cold War."

In New York, he was a director of the Rotary Club, and a member New-York Historical Society, the Huguenot Yacht Club in New Rochelle, and the Grolier Club.

=== Wesleyan University Library ===
After retiring from the New York Public Library, he served as the Caleb T. Winchester Librarian and Director of the Wesleyan University Library from 1953 to 1956, and in the latter year was elected librarian-emeritus. His service in this role was intended to steer the library after the retirement of Fremont Rider, and to help find a replacement. At the time of his return, The Wesleyan Argus noted that he went from a staff of over 500 people at the "greatest library in the world" to one of twenty at Wesleyan. In this article, Rice praised the staff, and discussed plans for increasing the budget and the addition of a rare book room at the library.

In 1954, he was listed as a member of the Editorial Advisory Committee for the New Century Cyclopedia of Names.

He was active in the First Methodist Church, Middletown and the Middletown Rotary Club.

In 1957, Rice gave the principal speech at the dedication of the new Hartford Public Library Building. He discussed the development of library science as largely an American institution. He went on to say;

Freedom is a dangerous way of life, but fortunately it is the way we live in the United States and public libraries must indeed help maintain it...Our citizens should not only know what they believe but why they believe it. Ideas can be dangerous, but suppression of ideas is fatal to a free society...Banned books of yesterday are sometimes classics of today.

He served as a trustee of the Russell Library in Middletown from 1954-1964.

In 1960, Rice participated in a Civil Rights fundraising drive led by Wesleyan students on Main Street in Middletown. The Hartford Courant wrote, "Students marched down the hill from the campus to Main Street where they lined a five-block area. About 20 faculty members including 72-year-old Paul North Rice, retired University librarian and a few co-eds from neighboring colleges joined the drive." He was the editor of the 9th edition of the Wesleyan University Alumni Record, 1961.

== Family life ==
Rice married Genevieve Briggs (1894–1994) on July 17, 1924, in La Porte, Indiana. Her parents were the Rev. Dr. Albertus Theodore Briggs and Lenore Alleman Briggs. Genevieve was an avid piano player. She graduated as valedictorian from Valparaiso High School in 1913, studied for a year at Valparaiso College, and graduated from DePauw University in 1916. She was a member of the Kappa Alpha Theta sorority and was elected to Phi Beta Kappa. She had taught Latin in Kentland, Indiana and at Jefferson High School, in Lafayette, Indiana in 1916-17. She later worked as the Education Director at the City Methodist Church in Gary, Indiana. When she took some graduate course at Columbia University, the minister of the Church, William Grant Seaman and his wife Laura Rice Seaman introduced her to Laura's brother, Paul. She served on the national board of the YMCA and was active in the Methodist Church, including the Women's Society at the Chester Hill Methodist Church, from which she received an award in 1953.

They had four children; Rachel Briggs Rice, Lenore Briggs Rice, Horace Briggs Rice and Charles Briggs Rice. They lived in Jackson Heights, Queens, on Yale Ave in Dayton, Ohio, Cliff Ave in Pelham, New York, and later on High Street in Middletown, Connecticut. After Paul's death, Genevieve lived in the house on High Street until 1986. The family summered in Cape Cod and in a cabin near the Sprucewold Lodge in Boothbay Harbor, Maine purchased in 1943.

== Genealogy ==
Paul North Rice was a direct descendant of Edmund Rice, an English immigrant to Massachusetts Bay Colony, as follows:

- Paul North Rice, son of

- Charles Francis Rice (1851–1927), son of

- William Rice (1821–1897), son of

- William Rice (1788–1863), son of
- Nathan Rice (1760–1838), son of
- John Rice (1704–1771), son of

- Ephraim Rice (1665–1732), son of
- Thomas Rice (1625–1681), son of

- Edmund Rice (1594–1663)

Non-profit organization positions
Preceded by Mary U. Rothrock	President of the American Library Association; 1947–1948	Succeeded by Errett Weir McDiarmid
