= Horace Jacobs Rice =

American attorney and academic (1882–1964)

- Born: September 25, 1882; Salem, Massachusetts, US
- Died: April 29, 1964 (aged 81); Evanston, Illinois, US
- Education: Wesleyan University
- Occupations: Attorney, Academic Dean
- Spouse: Mildred Ethel Ketchum (m. 1914)
- Children: Mary Prescott Rice (b.1915), William Owen Rice (b. 1917), Laura North Rice (b. 1920)
- Parent(s): Charles Francis Rice and Miriam Owen Jacobs

Horace Jacobs Rice (September 25, 1882 – April 29, 1964) was an American attorney, legal instructor, and academic dean.

== Early life and education ==
He was born in Salem, Massachusetts, to the Rev. Charles Francis Rice and Miriam Owen Jacobs. He was named for his maternal grandfather, Dr. Horace Jacobs. His siblings included lawyer, William Chauncey Rice and librarian, Paul North Rice.

He attended Wesleyan University, where he was a member of the Eclectic Society, and earned a Bachelor of Science degree in 1905. He earned an LLB from Harvard University in 1908, and an LLD from Western New England College in 1955.

== Career ==
He practiced law in Springfield, Massachusetts, from 1908 to 1959. During this time, he lived in Wilbraham, Massachusetts.

He was the associate dean of the Northeastern University School of Law in charge of the Springfield division from 1918 to 1942, and the dean of the College of Western New England School of Law from 1951 to 1954, after its split from Northeastern. He was an instructor in commercial law, contracts, and agency.

He was appointed to the board of governors of the Springfield Division of Northeastern in 1929, and he served as its chairman. He was a trustee of Western New England College from 1951-1959.

He was also the secretary of the Springfield City Evangelistic Union of the Methodist Episcopal Church. He served as executive secretary of the Springfield Peace and Arbitration Society.

== Family life ==
He married Mildred Ethel Ketchum of Springfield on September 10, 1914. She was the daughter of Stephen Cummings Ketchum and Melvina Blodgett Ketchum. She was a teacher, and a founder of the Springfield Garden Club in 1917. Their children were Mary Prescott Rice (Boyer) (1915-2002), William Owen Rice (1917-1945), and Laura North Rice (1920-2004).

Mary Rice Boyer attended Bennington College, the Graduate Teachers College, and the University of Chicago. She helped to found Women Strike for Peace. She married professor Donald A. Boyer and had two children. William Owen Rice served in the 539th Engineer Light Pontoon Company in World War II, and died on May 24, 1945. He is buried in the Netherlands American Cemetery. Laura North Rice was a notable academic, and a pioneer in the field of psychology.

Horace's wife Mildred died in 1958. Later in life, he lived in Winnetka, Illinois with his daughter.

== Genealogy ==
Horace Jacobs Rice was a direct descendant of Edmund Rice, an English immigrant to Massachusetts Bay Colony, as follows:

- Horace Jacobs Rice, son of

- Charles Francis Rice (1851–1927), son of

- William Rice (1821–1897), son of

- William Rice (1788–1863), son of
- Nathan Rice (1760–1838), son of
- John Rice (1704–1771), son of

- Ephraim Rice (1665–1732), son of
- Thomas Rice (1625–1681), son of

- Edmund Rice (1594–1663)
