= Horace Jacobs =

American physician

- Born: April 5, 1816; Royalston, Massachusetts, US
- Died: May 3, 1884 (aged 68); Salt Lake City, Utah, US
- Occupation: Doctor
- Spouse: Emily Laura Owen (m. 1842)
- Children: 5

Horace Jacobs (April 5, 1816 – May 3, 1884) was a medical doctor in Springfield, Massachusetts. He was the first doctor to practice Eclectic Medicine in the Connecticut River Valley area of Massachusetts.

== Early life and education ==
He was one of nine children born to Simeon Jacobs and Mary Kenney in Royalston, Massachusetts. Simeon's grandfather, the Rev. Whitman Jacobs was an influential Baptist preacher, while Mary's father, the Rev. Enoch Kenny was also a minister. His father died when he was young and he moved to live with his uncle, Dr. Isaac Jacobs in Exeter, Maine, where he studied in the public schools and began to learn about medicine.

== Career ==
He moved to South Hadley, Massachusetts, to study with his brother, Dr. Sumner Jacobs. After two years, he began practicing with his brother. He then moved to Chicopee Falls, Massachusetts, and practiced there until 1855. He studied in Westfield, Massachusetts for two years, then moved to Springfield, Massachusetts, where he was one of the first eclectic physicians. He had a very successful practice, with patients from all around. He became the leader in the practice of eclectic medicine in the area, respected by his peers. This was difficult at first, as others were unwilling to accept differing methods.

The Springfield Republican said at his death: "A steadfast sense of right determined his convictions and laid the course of his action. For this quality, together with his dignity, sound judgment and genuine good sense, he was much esteemed in his community."

He was an instructor for a student at Harvard University in 1845. He served in the City Council, and was president of the Holyoke Paper Company. He helped to develop West Springfield, where he had substantial real estate.

== Religion ==
Horace Jacobs had been raised a Baptist, as he had multiple ancestors who were Baptist ministers. While in Chicopee, he became a staunch Methodist. He was a trustee of the Pynchon Street Methodist Episcopal Church in Springfield, and later a trustee of Trinity Methodist Episcopal Church in Springfield.

== Family life ==
He married Emily Laura Owen, daughter of Abijah Owen and Laura Eggleston of Westfield on November 22, 1842. Her younger brother, Abijah Chauncey Owen participated in the California Gold Rush in 1849. They had 5 children: Chauncey Alonzo Jacobs, Mary Laura Jacobs, Miriam Owen Jacobs, Rachel Bates Jacobs, and Horace Homer Jacobs. Chauncey A. Jacobs graduated from Yale University and worked as a doctor in Boston. Miriam Owen Jacobs graduated from Vassar College and married the Rev. Charles Francis Rice, and they had a son named Horace Jacobs Rice. Rachel Bates Jacobs graduated from Vassar College and served on the Springfield School Committee. Horace H. Jacobs married Alice Taylor Jacobs and lived for some time in Dorchester, Massachusetts.

He died in Salt Lake City while returning from a trip to California to see his brother, Enoch.
