= Abijah Chauncey Owen =

Abijah Chauncey Owen (1824 – 1853) was a Massachusetts born person who travelled west to participate in the California Gold Rush.

== Family life ==
He was the son of Abijah Owen (1789-1866) and Laura Eggleston Owen (~1794-1881). His father was a prominent farmer in Westfield, Massachusetts, listed in a book of the "Rich Men of Massachusetts." His grandfather, Abijah Owen (1753-1808) also lived in Westfield. He was married to Miriam Brooks (~1758-1841) of West Springfield in 1784. In 1787, the Rev. Noah Atwater of the First Congregational Church of Westfield preached at Abijah Owen's house.

Abijah Chauncey Owen's siblings included Chauncey Abijah Owen, who died at age 1, Miriam S. Owen, Homer Owen, and Emily Laura Owen, who married Dr. Horace Jacobs. Most of the family members are buried in the Owen District Cemetery in Westfield. His middle name was used for his nephew, Chauncey Alonzo Jacobs, and his great nephew, William Chauncey Rice.

== Gold Rush ==
He sailed for California on the S.S. Edward Everett in January 1849, with very little money, but a letter attesting to his character.

He worked for the Boston and California Mining Company, and he travelled with recommendation letters attesting to his character. The ship landed in Benicia, California.

After finding some gold and even selling some to the U.S. Mint, Owen moved around, and even did some farm work. He contracted Cholera and died in Sacramento on April 12, 1853 at age 29. He is buried in his family plot in Westfield, Massachusetts.
