= Massachusetts Council of Churches =

Non-denominational Religious Organization

The Massachusetts Council of Churches is an organization of 17 Christian denominations in the Commonwealth of Massachusetts.

The Council works to bring the different denominations together, "expressing the unity of the church in Christ and joining in common witness." The organization was founded as the Massachusetts Federation of Churches in 1902. It became the Council of Churches after a merger in 1933.

Charles Francis Rice served as President from 1911 to 1921.

From 1953 until her ordination in 1966 Olivia P. Stokes was director of religious education at the Council.
