= Charles Francis Rice =

American minister and author (1851–1927)

- Born: April 14, 1851; Chelsea, Massachusetts, U.S.
- Died: October 2, 1927 (aged 76); Medford, Massachusetts, U.S.
- Education: Wesleyan University
- Occupation: Minister
- Organization: Methodist Episcopal Church
- Spouse: Miriam Owen Jacobs (m. 1875)
- Children: Laura Owen Rice (b. 1876); William Chauncey Rice (b. 1878); Horace Jacobs Rice (b. 1882); Paul North Rice (b. 1888); Rachel Caroline Rice (b. 1889)
- Parents: William Rice (father); Caroline Laura Rice (mother)

Charles Francis Rice (April 4, 1851 – October 2, 1927) was a prominent minister and author. He was a member of the New England Conference of the Methodist Episcopal Church for 50 years, serving as a District Superintendent for five years and as president of the Massachusetts Federation of Churches for 10 years.

== Early life and education ==
He was born April 14, 1851, in the parsonage of the Walnut Street Church in Chelsea, Massachusetts, the third son of the Reverend William Rice and Caroline Laura North. He attended Springfield High School in Springfield, Massachusetts, where he gave a valedictory address in 1868, and Wesleyan University, graduating as Salutatorian in 1872. He was a member of the Eclectic Society, and Phi Beta Kappa. He received an A.M. in 1875 and a D.D. degree from Wesleyan in 1893. The Wesleyan archives have his journals in which he describes his college experiences during the early 1870s.

== Career ==
=== Teaching ===
Before entering the ministry, he taught classics at both Springfield High School (1872–73) and was a latin tutor at Wesleyan University (1874–77). In 1874, he worked in the Springfield City Library. While a faculty member at Wesleyan, he served on the committee on the Annual Examination and the committee on the Olin Prize. He also served as president of the General Alumni Association. His father William Rice was a trustee, and his brother William North Rice was a professor and an acting president of Wesleyan.

=== Ministry ===
Rev. C. F. Rice was licensed as a member of the New England Conference of the Methodist Episcopal Church in 1873. He served as pastor at the following churches:

- Appleton Church, Neponset, Boston, Massachusetts (1877–80)
- Wesley Chapel, Salem, Massachusetts (1880–83)
- Methodist Church, Webster, Massachusetts (1883–85)
- St. Paul's Church, Lowell, Massachusetts (1885–88)
- Methodist Church, Leominster, Massachusetts (1888-93)
- Epworth Methodist Episcopal Church, Cambridge, Massachusetts (1893–98).
- St. Luke's Church, Springfield, Massachusetts (1898-00)
- Wesley Church, Springfield, Massachusetts (1900–05)
- Cambridge District Superintendent, residing in Newton, Massachusetts (1905-10)
- Winthrop Street Church, Roxbury, Boston, Massachusetts (1911-15)
- South Street Methodist Church, Lynn, Massachusetts (1916-20)
- Wellington Church, Medford, Massachusetts (1921-25)

He was noted for serving the Wellington Church after his retirement, until his death in 1927.

The Appleton Church building is still extant, now Christ Community Church, Neponset, 51 Walnut Street, Dorchester, MA.

=== Boards and Committee work ===
In 1896, he gave an address entitled "The outlook for the future" at the Centennial Exercises of the New England Conference held in Wilbraham, Massachusetts. He was an incoming trustee of the New England Methodist Conference in 1902, and dealt with the results of unwise investments, which had cost the church thousands of dollars. He was a delegate to the General Conference of the Methodist Episcopal Church in 1904 in Los Angeles and 1908 in Baltimore, the Inter-church Conference on Federation in 1905, the Federal Council of Churches of Christ in America, 1912, 1916 and 1920.

He served as president of the Massachusetts Federation of Churches from 1911 to 1921. In 1913, the church federations of other New England states voted to follow the model of Massachusetts in preparations for the 300th anniversary of the landing of the Pilgrims, Massachusetts-1920. In 1920, in a speech welcoming Robert Elliot Speer of the Federal Council of Churches and other guests, Rice welcomed guests "from the many spokes of the Nation's wheel to its great heart (Boston)." In 1921, he delivered a speech at the New England Southern Conference of the Methodist Episcopal Church in Providence, Rhode Island, held at the Trinity Union, now Trinity United Methodist Church. In 1922, the federation honored his service in a special ceremony at King's Chapel. Speakers included his brother, Rev. Dr. William North Rice, president of the Connecticut Federation, and Lt. Governor Alvan T. Fuller.

Rice was president of the Lynn Inter-church Union from 1918 to 1919. He was also director of the Federation of Churches and Religious Organizations of Greater Boston. He was also chairman of the Conference Board Exam from 1897 to 1905, president of the New England Educational Society, president of the New England Conference Board of Stewards, and a member of the board of education of the M.E. Church from 1908 to 1912. He was also chairman of the board of managers of the New England Deaconess Association.

As part of the celebration of 100 years of Methodism in Medford, MA in 1922, Rice convened a Union Prayer Meeting of the Methodist Churches of Medford, described as "A Love Feast in charge of Dr. C. F. Rice."

=== Other work ===
He wrote History of Methodism in Webster, Massachusetts, printed in the Webster Times in 1884. He hosted Methodist students from Harvard University in the 'Oxford Club' and presented a paper entitled Life in the Epworth Rectory in 1894. Also in 1894, he delivered the Baccalaureate Sermon for Lasell Seminary in the Auburndale Congregational Church. Part of his speech read:

There is a distinct purpose in the life of everyone. He is the great architect and we the builders, each having a part the great work, however trivial and inefficient our life may seem.

He also served on the visiting committee of the Boston University School of Theology, delivering communion at its Matriculation in 1905. Some of his sermons from Boston University chapel services are included in Noontime Messages in a College Chapel: Sixty-nine short addresses to Young People by Twenty-five Well-known Preachers, printed 1917.

He preached the dedicatory sermon at the new Methodist Episcopal Church in Feeding Hills, MA in 1901.

In 1905, as Presiding Elder of the Cambridge District, he dealt with accusations of the Rev. George A. Cooke against the Rev. Dr. Charles Pankhurst.

Also in 1905, he spoke at the memorial service for Frederick H. Rindge, benefactor of the Harvard-Epworth United Methodist Church where he had served as the first pastor after the church's completion.

He was a trustee at Wilbraham Wesleyan Academy and succeeded his father as president of its board of trustees from 1898 to 1912. In 1897, he attended a meeting of the Boston Alumni Association of the Wesleyan Academy at the American House. In 1912, the board of the school discussed plans to transition from being coeducational institution to a school for boys. He was a Republican, and a member of the Twentieth Century Club, Boston. He served as secretary for a Boston Wesleyan alumni group, and as secretary for the class of 1872.

In 1916, he was listed as a donor to the Massachusetts Society for the Prevention of Cruelty to Children. He enjoyed reading and playing golf.

== Family life ==
He married Miriam Owen Jacobs (1863-1901) on August 25, 1875. She born in Chicopee, MA, the daughter of Dr. Horace Jacobs and Emily Owen Jacobs. She was educated in the Springfield public schools, and graduated with honors from Vassar College in 1874. She was a member of the Woman's Foreign Missionary Society of the Methodist Episcopal Church. In 1895, she presented a paper on Professor Harriette Cooke's medical mission. She was elected vice president of the Boston West District. In 1898, she presented a paper at a meeting in Springfield. She was a member of the Cambridge Branch of the Massachusetts Indian Association, a local chapter of the Women's National Indian Association. In 1897, she was on the host committee for a Whist Tournament to raise money for Somerville Hospital. She died in 1901, aged 48.

Together, they had five children; Laura Owen Rice, William Chauncey Rice, Horace Jacobs Rice, Paul North Rice, and Rachel Caroline Rice. All three sons attended Wesleyan University. Laura Owen Rice attended Vassar College, and Rachel Caroline Rice attended Boston University. After graduating from Wesleyan in 1901, William Chauncey Rice received an A.M in Government from Yale in 1902. He then studied at Harvard, where he earned a law degree in 1908, and later wrote a dissertation on the decline of the Federalist Party in New England in 1912. Horace Jacobs Rice also graduated from Harvard Law School in 1908. Both were admitted to the bar and practiced law in Boston and Springfield respectively. Paul North Rice graduated from the New York Library School and became a notable librarian at the New York Public Library., who served as minister of the City Methodist Church in Gary, Indiana, and as the president of Dakota Wesleyan University. Rachel Caroline Rice married Burton Howard Camp, who was a longtime mathematics professor at Wesleyan University.

The New York Times lists Rev. C. F. Rice and his brother Professor William North Rice as having sailed to Liverpool on the Cunard Line ship, SS Bothnia, and returned on the SS Catalonia in 1881. C. F. Rice presented a sketch of his European trip at a meeting of the Essex Institute, in 1882.

In 1898 with William North Rice, he co-authored and published William Rice: A Memorial, a book about their father the Rev. William Rice.

In 1904, he and Laura O. Rice were listed as being at Camp Curry, at Yosemite in The San Francisco Call.

In 1907, his daughter Laura Owen Rice married the Rev. Dr. William Grant Seaman in Newton, MA. Charles F. Rice officiated the wedding with his brother, William North Rice.

On January 10, 1914, Rice hosted his son in law, Rev. William Grant Seaman, who preached at Winthrop Street Methodist Episcopal Church in Roxbury.

He died in 1927 at his home, 59 4th Street in Medford. His funeral was held at the Copley Methodist Church in Boston, and he was buried with family members in the Springfield Cemetery.

== Genealogy ==
Charles Francis Rice was a direct descendant of Edmund Rice, an English immigrant to Massachusetts Bay Colony, as follows:

- Charles Francis Rice, son of

- William Rice (1821–1897), son of

- William Rice (1788–1863), son of
- Nathan Rice (1760–1838), son of
- John Rice (1704–1771), son of

- Ephraim Rice (1665–1732), son of
- Thomas Rice (1625–1681), son of

- Edmund Rice (1594–1663)
