= Errett Weir McDiarmid =

American librarian and academic

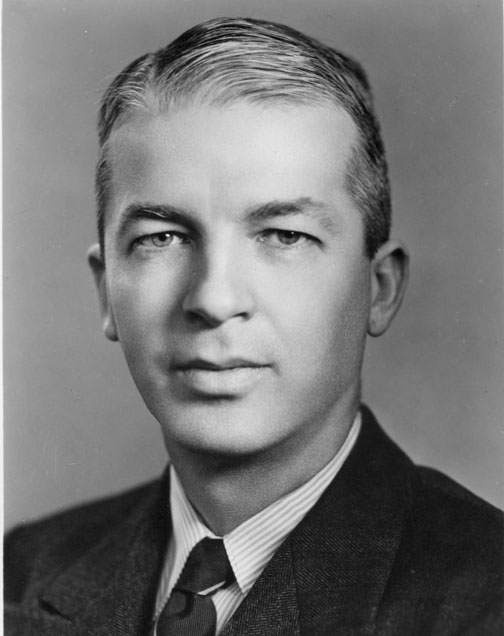
- McDiarmid c. 1950

President of the American Library Association
- In office 1948–1949
- Preceded by: Paul North Rice
- Succeeded by: Milton E. Lord

Personal details
- Born: July 13, 1909 West Virginia, US
- Died: April 27, 2000 (aged 90) St. Paul, Minnesota, US
- Education: Texas Christian University; Emory University; University of Chicago
- Occupation: Librarian

Errett Weir McDiarmid (July 13, 1909 – April 27, 2000) was an American librarian and academic who was president of the American Library Association from 1948 to 1949. McDiarmid was born in West Virginia and received his bachelor's degree in 1929 from Texas Christian University and his master's degree in 1930, also from Texas Christian. He went on to receive a bachelor's degree in Library Science in 1931 from Emory University and his doctorate from the University of Chicago Graduate Library School in 1934.

== Career ==
McDiarmid was the librarian at Baylor University from 1934 to 1937 and went on to be an associate professor at the University of Illinois Library School and from 1943 to 1951 he served as the university librarian and director of the Division of Library Instruction at the University of Minnesota. At the University of Minnesota, McDiarmid served as Dean of the College of Science, Literature and the Arts and on the faculty of the Library School and Graduate School. He established a Children's Literature Research Collection in 1949 based on a donation by Irvine Kerlan.

In 1951, McDiarmid became Dean of the University of Minnesota School of Liberal Arts. In 1963, he was appointed Director of the Graduate School Fellowship Office where he worked until his retirement in 1978. He continued to volunteer in the University of Minnesota Special Collections unit, working with their Sherlock Holmes collections. McDiarmid helped found the Norwegian Explorers, a group of faculty that are Sherlock Holmes fans. He donated over 15,000 items of Holmes-related materials to the University of Minnesota in 1995.

== Publications ==
- McDiarmid, Errett Weir. 1948. "Crusade for an Educated America." ALA Bulletin 42 (July): 289–93.
- The Library Survey: Problems and Methods (1940)
- McDiarmid, E. W.; McDiarmid, John (1943). The Administration of the American Public Library. Chicago: The American Library Association and the University of Illinois Press.
- McDiarmid, E. W. 1942. "Place of Experience in Developing College and University Librarians." Library Quarterly 12 (July): 614–21.
- McDiarmid, E. W. jr. 1939. "Approach to the Problems of Library Organization." Library Quarterly 9 (April): 133–44

Non-profit organization positions
Preceded by Paul North Rice	President of the American Library Association; 1948–1949	Succeeded by Milton E. Lord
