= Loleta Fyan =

American librarian

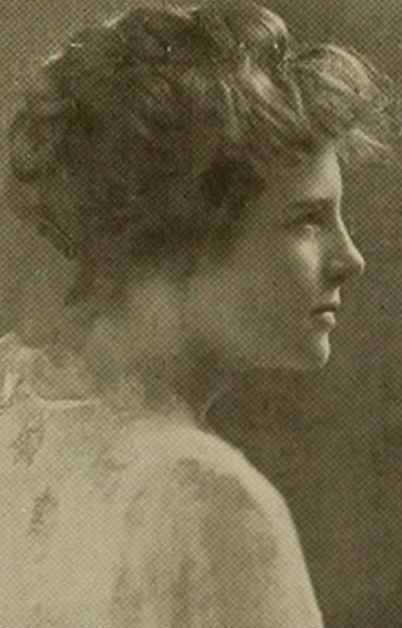
- Loleta I. Dawson, from a 1915 yearbook

President of the American Library Association
- In office 1951–1952
- Preceded by: Clarence R. Graham
- Succeeded by: Robert Bingham Downs

Personal details
- Born: Loleta Irene Dawson; May 14, 1894 Clinton, Iowa, US
- Died: March 15, 1990 (aged 95) East Lansing, Michigan, US
- Spouse: Clarence E. Fyan (m. 1926)
- Parents: Albert Foster Dawson; Phoebe R. DeGroat
- Education: Wellesley College
- Occupation: Librarian

Loleta Dawson Fyan (May 14, 1894 – March 15, 1990) was President of the American Library Association in 1951-1952. She was the first professional librarian for the State of Michigan (1941 to 1961). Long before the invention of the creation of the Internet, she believed that information should be available to all. She was instrumental in the passing of federal support for libraries.

== Early life and education ==
Loleta Irene Dawson was born 14 May 1894 in Clinton, Iowa. Her father, Albert Foster Dawson, was a U.S. Representative from Iowa. Dawson's political activity may have been an influence on Fyan's lifelong participation in a variety of organizations, including the American Library Association, the Michigan Library Association, the League of Women Voters and the Michigan Rural-Urban Women's Conference. Because of her father's position, she was able to meet Presidents Theodore Roosevelt and William Howard Taft. Fyan's mother was Phoebe R. (DeGroat) Dawson, whose family came to Iowa via New York and the Erie Canal.

She married Clarence E. Fyan on July 17, 1926. Fyan became a teacher after her graduation in 1915 from Wellesley College with a B.A. in botany and music.

== Career ==
In 1916 she began what became her lifelong passion in Davenport, Iowa, delivering books from the main public library to nearby schools and farms for people who would not otherwise be able to access reading materials. "Books are dead until they meet the human mind," Fyan believed and so she created the first "bookmobile," providing service in 1921 with a $10,000 budget and a Ford.

For twenty years, Fyan was head of the Wayne County Library in Michigan. Under her leadership it blossomed into a staff of one hundred librarians, a fleet of cars and several library branches.

"Don't listen to those people who say that democracy won't work.", she stated in a Library Journal article. "Of course it won't work. It's up to us to work it".

=== 1951 fire ===
Fyan was unfortunate in having to oversee the effects of a major fire in 1951 that resulted in the loss of thousands of documents due to fire and water damage in the State Office Building in February 1951. This event encouraged builders such as those of the Ecorse Public Library to build the library "completely fireproof." This building was among others built with funds directly received as a result of Fyan's work on outlining post-war projects.

Fyan also encountered difficulties raising funds. "There is never enough money, and painful choices must be made each year" she stated in her Report of the President to the American Library Association (ALA) in January, 1952. She was instrumental in developing library legislation titled P.A. 106 of 1937 which enabled the Michigan State Library to create the State Aid and Traveling Libraries Division.

=== Career achievements ===
- Michigan State Librarian, 1941–1961
- Davenport Free Public Library, 1916–1919
- Detroit Public Library, 1920–1921
- Wayne County Librarian, 1921–1938; 1939–1941
- Michigan Library Association President, 1934–1935
- Michigan Library Association Secretary/Treasurer, 1935–1936; 1941
- Michigan Rural Women's Conference Chair, 1935–1941

== Legacy ==
In her will, Fyan left money and scholarships to multiple different entities: the Loleta Fyan Continuing Education Scholarship Fund, the Loleta Fyan Small & Rural Library Conference, the Fyan Community Leadership Award, and the ALA Loleta D. Fyan Grant all meant to support smaller libraries in rural communities.

The State Board in 1961 requested her resignation, the stated reason being that she was too old to hold the job.

Non-profit organization positions
| Preceded by Clarence R. Graham | President of the American Library Association; 1951–1952 | Succeeded by Robert Bingham Downs |
