= W. A. Camps =

British classical scholar

William Anthony Camps (28 December 1910 – 17 January 1997) was a British classical scholar, and also served as Master of Pembroke College, Cambridge from 1970 to 1981. He was known as Tony Camps.

He entered Pembroke College in 1928 and became a Fellow in 1933. He became a lecturer there in 1939, and from 1947 to 1962 was the college's Senior Tutor in Classics.

During World War II he served with the Ministry of Economic Warfare.

In the 1960s he edited a four-volume series of the works of the poet Propertius. He wrote An Introduction to Virgil's Aeneid (1969) and An introduction to Homer (1980).

In 1953 he married the American economist Miriam Camp.

Academic offices
Preceded by W. V. D. Hodge	Master of Pembroke College, Cambridge; 1970-1981	Succeeded by Richard Adrian
