= Olivia P. Stokes =

American educator and activist (1916–2002)

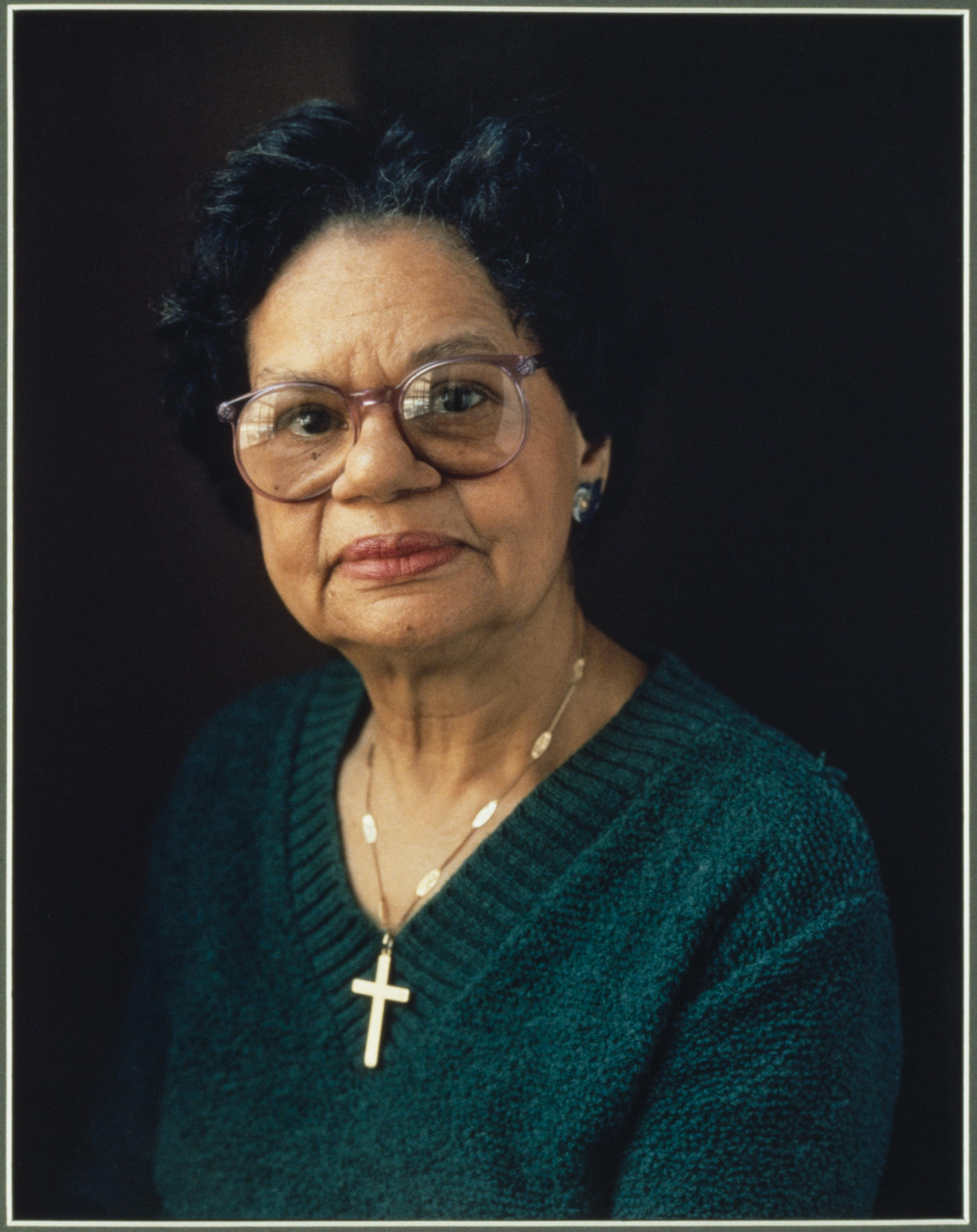
- Stokes c. 1982
- Born: January 11, 1916; Middlesex, North Carolina
- Died: May 24, 2002 (aged 86)
- Education: Teachers College, Columbia University, Ed.D., 1952
- Known for: religious educator, ordained Baptist minister, author, administrator, and civil rights activist

Olivia Pearl Stokes (January 11, 1916 – May 24, 2002) was a religious educator, ordained Baptist minister, author, administrator, and civil rights activist. As the first African American woman to receive a doctorate in religious education, Stokes was a pioneer in her field dedicated to empowering disenfranchised and underrepresented groups. A majority of her work reflects her primary role as a religious educator, her commitment to develop leadership training, and her efforts to eliminate negative stereotypes of women and African Americans. She was also an avid student of African cultures, and developed programs to promote understanding of African civilizations.

== Early life ==
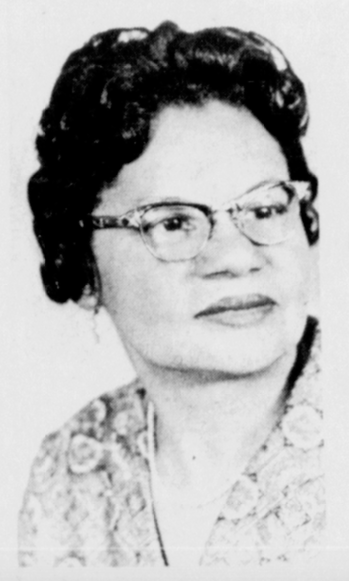
Photograph of Stokes

Olivia Pearl Stokes was born in Middlesex, North Carolina, on January 11, 1916, on the Stokes Place — a collection of farmland owned by the Stokes family, known across the county as one of the few upper middle-class black property owning families in North Carolina. She was the second eldest and the first daughter of four children to Bessie Thomas Stokes Vann, a schoolteacher (b. 1893) and William Harmon Stokes (d. 1923) and one child to Bessie Thomas Stokes Vann and Lester Lee Vann. Her siblings are Clarence (d. 1970), Bernice (d. 1943), Beatrice, and Lester (d. 1946). After the death of Olivia's father when Olivia was 7, Bessie Thomas Stokes Vann sold their land and moved the family to Harlem, New York in 1925 for the goal of educating her children, where they joined the Abyssinian Baptist Church.

From an early age, Stokes grew up educated and immersed in both Christian Baptist and African culture and values, impressed upon by her mother, who wanted a religious experience for children and emphasized leadership in the community. Stokes' mother also influenced her children by serving as an early role model: young Olivia took after her in her interests, intellectual abilities and matters of etiquette and protocol. Bessie Thomas Stokes was remarried in New York to Lester Lee Van, a deacon at Union Baptist in New York. Olivia's childhood outside of school was spent at Abyssinian Baptist, the first black church in America with a master's degree educated director of religious education as well as at the Young Women's Christian Association (YWCA), both blocks away from Olivia's family home.

== Education ==
Stokes started elementary school in New York at Public School 89, during the time period when the school had welcomed its first black woman principal, Gertrude Ayers. Stokes and Ayres remained close friends after Stokes had matriculated. She was greatly influenced by writers, scholars, missionaries, and community activists starting from an early age including W. E. B. Du Bois, Walter White, Lester Granger, and Mattie Mae Davis, and she wrote, "In the black community, the average person had always been fearful of approaching great leaders. But we were taught as children that we were as great as anybody."

She went on to attend Junior High 136, where her white English teacher, a Mrs. Wright, encouraged her to apply to Hunter College High School, a school for gifted scholars. She matriculated to Hunter College in the 10th grade, where she and Barbara Watson (daughter of Judge James S. Watson, one of the first two Black Americans elected as a judge in New York) were the only two Black students. After her stepfather's death, Olivia transferred to Wadleigh High School without telling her mother, given the changing financial situation that would befall the family. After graduating from Wadleigh, Olivia went to City College of New York for the next 12 years, taking night classes while working full-time first at the YWCA and then at the Baptist Educational Center. She graduated from her undergraduate work after shifting to New York University (NYU) for her final year in 1947 with a degree in Presocial Work and Education. She finished her master's degree in Religious Education in 1948.

After receiving her master's degree, Stokes was offered a fellowship (Ed.D. in Religious Education) at Columbia University's Teachers College and graduated at the highest grade level after defending her dissertation in 1952 and became the first African American woman to earn a doctorate in Religious Education. Her dissertation analyzed and made recommendations on the leadership education of Protestant churches across the city of New York. The research focused primarily on the Baptist Education Center and its training programs, given her close working relationship with the Center throughout her educational career. Her educational inspirations include Dr. Zorbaugh, the head of sociology and psychology at NYU, Samuel Hamilton in religious education at NYU, and Harrison Elliot, Lewis Sherrill, Osborne at Columbia. Olivia's study of Religious Education came at a time in American history when the curriculum was one of the most "dynamic and generative fields in the theological curriculum."

== Family background and social life ==
Olivia Pearl Stokes was born into the Stokes family, a free upper-middle-class Black family that greatly valued education, community involvement, and the Christian faith. She was born the second daughter of five children. These tenets shaped her upbringing, and from an early age, Olivia's identity and values were tied to her family.

She spent her early childhood on Stokes Place, a collection of hundreds of acres that belonged to the Stokes family—one of the only Black property owning families in North Carolina. Though their initial acquisition of land is unclear, the Stokes grew their landholding significantly over the years. The Stokeses were well known in the county as employers, employing a number of both white and Black employees throughout the seasons. After Olivia's paternal grandfather, T.O. Stokes, died, he gave land to erect the Stokes Chapel (now a federal landmark on Route 64). Furthermore, Olivia is 5th cousins with Bishop Anson Phelps Stokes, who was head of the Episcopal church in Massachusetts. As for her maternal heritage, Olivia's great-great-grandfather, William Allen Thomas, was the first and only white Chief of the Cherokee Natives, making Olivia 1/8 Cherokee Native. Thomas also served as a member of the North Carolina state legislature and Congress.

Throughout her childhood growing up in the Black church (Abyssinian Baptist Church), Olivia and her siblings were taught to understand the contribution that Africa has in the world, as well as the African patterns of life, the rules, culture, crafts, and governments.

Out of her siblings, Olivia was closest to her sister Beatrice. The two girls shared common interests and spent a great deal of time together despite their differences in personality: even as a child, Olivia was strong-minded and outspoken while her sister was considered more "gentle". The sisters' friendly history contrasts with Olivia's strained relationship to her brother, Clarence. In her writings, Olivia has little compassion for her brother's struggles with alcoholism and seems disappointed in how he lived his life. Very little is said about Olivia's relationship with her other siblings, Bernice and Lester.

Her father passed away when she was seven years old. This ultimately led to her mother moving them to Harlem, New York to start living a new life and to provide the best education for her five children.

Despite never getting married, Olivia spent her life immersed in her work both in the ministry and in education, deriving much joy from nurturing learning and curiosity in her students and peers.

== Early career ==
Stokes began her career in 1935, as director of the information desk at YWCA. She worked there until 1941, when she was offered the position of associate director of the Baptist Educational Center, a school that provided training programs for ministers and the parishes of 157 churches. The school trained over 500 Baptists—who were mostly black—across Harlem every week. During this period of time, she also acted as president of the New York State Christian Youth Conference, and became secretary of the Youth Movement in 1941.

=== Notable connections ===
Through Olivia's long-time work in the Christian community and network, Stokes befriended a number of influential academics, activists, and artists in the New York area. These acquaintances included, but were not limited to: Benjamin Mays, the former leader of the academic community in Atlanta, who authored a number of papers and columns about the Black community Fred Patterson, the former head of the United Negro College Fund Marian Anderson, the first African-American soloist in 1941 to sing at the New York Metropolitan Opera Langston Hughes, the renowned poet, novelist, and activist Jackie Robinson, the first African American baseball player to play in the MLB Ella Fitzgerald, the American jazz singer.

== Massachusetts Council of Churches and National Council of Churches ==
In 1953, Stokes became Director of the Department of Religious Education of the Massachusetts Council of Churches. She was the only black staff member on the Massachusetts Council, and she held a position generally held by white men. Upon taking this position, she noted that people thought they had to give up their religion and values in order to work during the summer months. She also faced other problems, including miseducation of religious teachings by clergy, under-educated clergy, and black middle class Protestants who hadn't given up on the faith but who had given up on the institutional church. To address these issues, she designed and directed an education program for Protestants at resort center churches. These programs held classes at hours staggered from workers' schedules to allow workers to not have to give up the religion because of work. She also worked with the well-educated and religiously diverse staff—including Greeks, fundamentalist Christians, Pentecostals, liberal Christians, and more—to produce education books to be used in churches.

During her time working in the Massachusetts Council of Churches, Stokes taught four courses in the Christian ministry program at Harvard University, as well as taught as a guest lecturer at Andover Newton Theological School and Boston University. Additionally, she acted as guest consultant in early childhood programs at Tufts University. When the president of the Urban League asked her to speak about her work to his board, she saw this opportunity as a chance to prove that black leadership can be as effective as white leadership. She pushed for more speaking time to the board, which eventually won her the opportunity to minister in the Massachusetts Senate. This marked the first time that a woman had led the prayers at the opening of the senate.

In 1966, Stokes accepted ordination in the American Baptist Church, after over two decades of refusing ordination invitations because she felt that she had more influence as an educator than as a female minister who would be discriminated against by male clergy. After ordination, she resigned her position in the Massachusetts Council of Churches to become the associate director of Urban Education, in the Department of Educational Development at the National Council of Churches. In this position, which she held until 1973, Stokes was instrumental in developing the Black Curriculum Resource Center. She also organized religious educators across the United States, working with 42 national denominations. Last but not least, during the civil rights movement, she assisted both white and black civil rights leaders to connect with each other and with their Christian faith.

== Study of African culture ==
Stokes grew up immersed in African culture: her mother, Bessie Stokes Vann, worked frequently with Christian missionaries who traveled to Africa. By the time Mrs. Vann was in her mid-twenties, she possessed extensive knowledge of African culture and history. Meanwhile, farther back in Olivia's family tree, her great-aunt Alberta Thomas was involved in Marcus Garvey's Back-to-Africa movement.

As Olivia grew older, she took after her family, becoming known for her in-depth study of African culture— particularly the role of women and families. Part of her work involved creating educational materials that she hoped would change the way American schoolchildren understood Africa through their textbooks. She similarly attempted to improve American understanding of African culture through her own fictional children's stories: she authored Why the Spider Lives in Corners: African Facts and Fun and The Beauty of Being Black: Folktales, Poems, and Art From Africa, two children's books that incorporate African culture and relied on African co-authors. These books placed particular emphasis on African art and expression, as well as the variety of cultures present in different African countries. Meanwhile, in her work with the Christian community, Olivia pushed churches to include lessons about Africa in their ministry, encouraging pastors to emphasize the importance of African heritage and history.

Stokes began traveling to Africa herself in 1958, continuing to visit the continent throughout the remainder of her life. Stokes' initial trip to Africa was inspired by her own desire to learn more about the country, as well as for the sake of "personal growth and significant research." Two years later, in 1960, she approached publishing company Houghton Mifflin with a book idea that incorporated discussions on the ability of African women to rise quickly through the social ranks of society. After her initial travel to Africa, Stokes began leading tours of Africa for graduate students, spearheading twenty separate trips between the years of 1958 and 1981. Stokes' work also extended to improving the education system of Africa: From 1973 to 1976, she worked on building a graduate program to train educators in Nigeria, ultimately partnering with 5 different Nigerian universities.

== Other community involvement and employment ==
Outside of her work in the church community and the education advocacy world, Stokes was a teacher herself. Between 1973 and 1976, she taught as associate professor of education at the Herbert H. Lehman College of City University of New York. There, she also served as chairperson of the development of a multi-ethnic, multi-cultural teacher education program. Later, she taught part-time at New York University's School of Education while serving as interim pastor at the Emmanuel Baptist Church in Brooklyn. She was also a member of the American Association of University Professors. Her extensive experience in religious education allowed her to serve as trustee of Berea College between 1976 and 1988, educational consultant at various theological schools, and other influential roles. In 1955, 1960 and 1979, she led White House Conferences on Education. In 1976, Stokes, with a group of other professionals, founded the Harlem Guidance Center, which provides a family-focused guidance service for underachieving children in Harlem.

Her talents also extended beyond teaching and into writing: in 1952, Jackie Robinson offered her a job as an NBC sports writer. Stokes' passion for service outweighed his generously salaried offer, however, and she opted instead to continue working at the community center where she was previously employed.

== Awards ==
Stokes was a member of Delta Kappa Delta, the National Association for the Study of Afro-American Life and History, the Adult Education Association, the American Association of University Professors. In 1957, she was the recipient of the Negro Business and Professional Women's Clubs' Sojourner Truth Award. In 1976, she received the National Council of Negro Women's Bethune Achievement Award.

== Sources ==
- Watson, Sandra M. (25 September 1979). "Olivia Pearl Stokes. OH-31". Black Women Oral History Project. Interviews, 1976–1981. Schlesinger Library, Radcliffe Institute, Harvard University.
- Dease Lee, Violet L (2012). A model of leadership for Black/African American women in religious education: A study of the legacy of Olivia Pearl Stokes (Thesis). OCLC 1160177675. ProQuest 1316907363.
- Keely, Barbara Anne, ed. (1997). Faith of Our Foremothers: Women Changing Religious Education. Westminster John Knox Press. ISBN 978-0-664-25721-7.
