= Miriam Camp =

American economist, author, and diplomat (1916–1994)

Miriam C. Camps
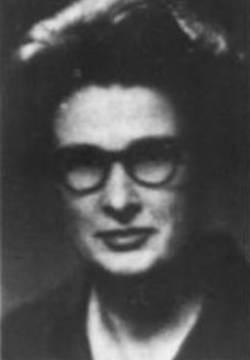
- Miriam Camps, from a 1968 publication of the US Department of State
- Born: Miriam Camp; July 17, 1916; Lynn, Massachusetts
- Died: December 15, 1994 (aged 78); Cambridgeshire, UK
- Spouse: W. A. Camps

Academic background
- Education: Mount Holyoke College, Bryn Mawr

Academic work
- Notable ideas: Marshall Plan, European co-operation
- Awards: Fellow of Wolfson College

Miriam Camps (née Camp) (1916–1994) was an economist, author and State Department official.

== Family life and education ==
Miriam Camp was born in Lynn, Massachusetts in 1916, the daughter of Professor Burton Howard Camp and Rachel Caroline Rice. Her maternal grandparents were the Reverend Charles Francis Rice and Miriam Owen Jacobs. She was educated at Mount Holyoke College (graduated 1937) and Bryn Mawr College (graduated with a master's degree in 1938).

In 1954, she married the English classicist William Camps.

She was awarded an honorary degree from Mount Holyoke College in 1959 and became a fellow of Wolfson College, Cambridge.

She died of lung cancer in Cambridgeshire on December 30, 1994.

== Career ==
She joined the United States Department of State during World War II and subsequently worked in the Board of Economic Warfare at the U.S. Embassy in London, the Office of the Assistant Secretary for Economic and Social Affairs, the Policy Planning Staff and the Bureau of European Affairs. She played a major role in the development and implementation of the Marshall Plan. She said of herself, "There were many fathers of the OEEC (Organization for European Economic Cooperation ) but there was only one mother". She left the State Department in 1954 following her marriage and began writing a series of books on European economic co-operation and its relationship with the US. She put forward the view that Britain had made a mistake in delaying its entry into the EEC for so long. However, she later opposed the increasing power of the European Parliament.

She returned to the State Department in 1961, initially as a consultant and subsequently had several roles in the office of the Secretary of State. She was the first woman to be vice chair of the U.S. State Department's Planning Council. She continued to take an interest in issues surrounding economic growth and was a faculty member on session 188 of the Salzburg Global Seminar – New Perspectives for Long Term Growth.

== Publications ==
- The European Free Trade Association: A preliminary appraisal (Britain and the European Market series;no.4) (1959)
- Britain and the European Community (1964)
- What Kind of Europe? (1965)
- European Unification in the Sixties (1966)
