= Abbott Barnes Rice =

American politician

Member of the Massachusetts House of Representatives from the Newton, Middlesex district
- In office 1919–1922

Member of the Massachusetts Senate from the Newton, Middlesex district
- In office 1923–1926

Personal details
- Born: April 17, 1862 Hopkinton, Massachusetts
- Died: October 10, 1926 (aged 64) Newton, Massachusetts
- Spouse: Amy Thurber Bridges (m. 29 August 1890)
- Children: Adams Thurber Rice (1892-1976); Willard Wadsworth Rice (1895-1967); Lawrence Bridges Rice (1898-1992)
- Education: Brown University A.B. 1884 and A.M. 1889
- Profession: merchant, state legislator

Abbott Barnes Rice (1862–1926) was a Boston merchant, a member of the Massachusetts House of Representatives, and a member of the Massachusetts Senate.

== Biography ==
Abbott Barnes Rice was born in Hopkinton, Massachusetts on 17 April 1862 to Dexter Rice and Mary Ann (Adams) Rice. He was educated at Brown University earning a Bachelor of Arts in 1884, and a Master of Arts in 1889. He married Amy Thurber Bridges of Framingham, Massachusetts on 29 August 1890 and they had three children. He established his early career as a clothing outfitter with his offices at 121 Tremont St. in Boston. In his later years beginning in 1919, he became engaged in politics first being elected and serving two terms in the Massachusetts House of Representatives. In 1923 he was elected to the Massachusetts Senate where he served two terms until his death. Rice died on 10 October 1926 at his home in Newton, Massachusetts.

== Genealogy & family relations ==
Rice's son Willard W. Rice (1895–1967) was a member of the silver medal winning U.S. Hockey team in the 1924 Olympic Winter Games, and his son Lawrence Bridges Rice (1898–1992) was an architect and a nationally ranked tennis champion. Abbott Barnes Rice was a direct descendant of Edmund Rice, an early immigrant to Massachusetts Bay Colony, as follows:

- Abbott Barnes Rice, son of
  - Dexter Rice (1811-1885), son of

  - John Rice (1781-1854), son of
  - Hezekiah Rice (1745-1827), son of
  - Bezaleel Rice (1721-1806), son of

      - Bezaleel Rice (1697-ca1745), son of
      - David Rice (1659-1723), son of
      - Henry Rice (1617-1711), son of

      - Edmund Rice, (ca1594-1663)
