= Richard H. Rice =

American mechanical engineer and inventor (1863-1922)

Richard Henry Rice
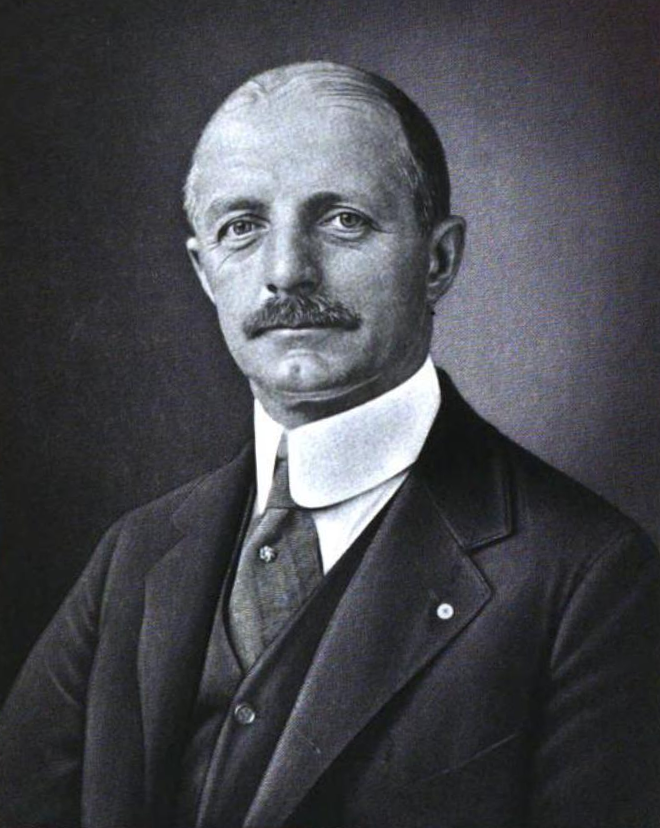
- Born: January 9, 1863; Marlborough, Massachusetts
- Died: February 10, 1922 (aged 59); Bolton, New York, United States
- Education: Stevens Institute of Technology, M.E. 1885; Ph.D.(honoris causa) 1921
- Known for: Improvements to the Corliss steam engine; principal engineer of Rice & Sargent Engine Company
- Spouses: Mary Sue (Durgin) Rice (m. 1887; d. 1897); Alice Woodman (Kimball) Rice (m. 1898)
- Children: Phyllis Rice (b. 1890); Richard Drury Rice (1892-1922); Sue Durgin (Rice) Northrup (b. 1895)

Richard Henry Rice (January 9, 1863 – February 10, 1922) was an American mechanical engineer and inventor who is known for many patents related to improvements to the Corliss steam engine, and his partnership in founding the Rice & Sargent Engine Company of Providence, Rhode Island.

== Early life and family ==
Richard Henry Rice was born January 9, 1863, in Rockland, Maine, to Albert Smith Rice and Frances Weston (Baker) Rice. He received his Masters of Engineering degree from Stevens Institute of Technology in 1885. He was first married on April 6, 1887, to Mary Sue Durgin, daughter of William B. Durgin, a silversmith and clock-maker from Concord, New Hampshire, and they had three children. After the 1897 death of his first wife, Rice married Alice Woodman Kimball of New York March 26, 1898.

== Engineering career ==
Rice began his engineering career in 1885 heading the testing laboratory at Stevens Institute. From 1885-1886 he was a special apprentice at the Pittsburgh, Cincinnati, Chicago and St. Louis Railroad shops in Dennison, Ohio. From 1886-1887 he was a designer of marine engines at the Bath Iron Works in Bath, Maine. From 1887-1891 Rice lived in Cambridge, Massachusetts, where he was the a designer and chief draftsman for the E.D. Levitt Company in Cambridgeport, Massachusetts, and from 1891-1894 he was the superintendent engineer at the William A. Harris Steam Engine Company in Providence, Rhode Island. In 1894, he was an incorporating officer in the Rice & Sargent Engine Company, and he served as treasurer of the company. Rice and Sargent steam engines were used extensively for power plants in manufacturing companies from the mid-1890s to the 1930s. Rice was also an owner of the Providence Engineering Works, also in Providence. Starting in 1903 he was a consultant on steam engineering and in charge of turbine development at the General Electric Company in Lynn, Massachusetts. In recognition of over 50 patents relating to steam, air and water apparati, he received an honorary Ph.D. in Engineering from the Stevens Institute in 1921. He died a year later on February 10, 1922, in Bolton, New York.

== Selected patents ==
During his career Rice received over 50 U.S. and international patents, mostly for improvements to the Corliss steam engine and steam turbine technology. Some of his most significant patents are as follows:

Diagram of the Rice & Sargent steam engine 1915

- (U.S. patent 473,085) Cut-Off Valve Gear, April 19, 1892
- (U.S. patent 526,267) Valve Gear, September 18, 1894.
- (U.S. patent 546,967) Vacuum Activated Dash Pot, April 27, 1895
- (U.S. patent 539,758) Stop-Motion for Governors May 21, 1895
- (U.S. patent 536,156) Stop-Motion for Governors, May 19, 1895
- (U.S. patent 571,687) Cylindrical Rotary Valve, November 17, 1896
- (U.S. patent 642,054) Steam Activated Dash Pot for Engines, May 16, 1898
- (U.S. patent 737,495) Valve-Gear for Steam Engines, August 25, 1903.
- (U.S. patent 974,186) Step Bearing, November 14, 1905
- (U.S. patent 957,903) Portable Fire Engine Pump, May 17, 1910.
- (U.S. patent 1,297,249) Valve Gear, June 29, 1917
- (U.S. patent 1,317,036) Maneuvering Valve for Ship Engines, January 30, 1919
- (U.S. patent 1,326,690) Bearing Shaft Seal Assembly, March 23, 1918

== Genealogy ==
Richard Henry Rice was a direct descendant of Edmund Rice, an English immigrant to Massachusetts Bay Colony, as follows:

- Richard Henry Rice, son of

- Albert Smith Rice (1837 – ?), son of
- Richard D. Rice (1810 – ?), son of

- Nathan Drury Rice (1784 – ?), son of
- James Rice (1758 – 1829), son of
- Richard Rice (1730 – 1793), son of
- Ezekiel Rice (1700 – ?), son of

- Jonathan Rice (1654 – 1725), son of
- Henry Rice (1617 – 1711)

- Edmund Rice (1594 – 1663)
