= Kentucky Library Association =

Professional association for librarians in Kentucky

- Nickname: KLA
- Formation: June 28, 1906; 120 years ago
- Founded at: Louisville, Kentucky
- Tax ID no.: 61-6042682
- Parent organization: American Library Association
- Website: www.klaonline.org

The Kentucky Library Association (KLA) is a professional organization for Kentucky's librarians and library workers. It is headquartered in Prospect, Kentucky. It was founded on June 28, 1906, in Louisville, Kentucky with 52 charter members. Its original goal was to form a state library commission as well as to increase access to free state documents. William Frederick Yust was elected as the association's first president. The third conference the KLA took part in was a tri-state conference with Ohio and Indiana. In 2011 the KLA held a joint conference with the Kentucky School Media Association in order to work together with librarians on creativity, cooperation, and the impact of change. The KLA became a state chapter of the American Library Association in 1917, and is a member of the Southeastern Library Association. One of the KLA's daughter organizations, the Kentucky Public Library Association (KPLA), aims to encourage growth of its members, improve library service, and work with other organizations to do so.

== Mission statement ==
"The mission of the Kentucky Library Association is to provide leadership for the development, promotion, and improvement of library and information services and the profession of librarianship in order to enhance learning and ensure access to information for all".

== Legislative activity ==
In 1938, the KLA was instrumental in the creation of the Library Extension Division (LED), a State Board for the certification of librarians. In 1940 the Kentucky legislature approved a bill allowing the Division to "accept and administer Federal funds" for libraries in the state, should they become available. The Library Service Act was signed by President Eisenhower in 1956, this provided federal grants to promote public library services in rural areas. the Library Service Act grant was administered by the Library Extension Division. In 1945 the KLA advocated for library service to inmates, and the libraries of the ten Kentucky penal institutions were placed under the supervision of a trained librarian.

== Publications ==
The KLA's first publication, Bulletin of the Kentucky Library Association, began in 1933. The KLA currently publishes a scholarly journal, Kentucky Libraries (ISSN 0732-5452), as well as an informal newsletter, IN-FO-CUS.

== See also ==
- List of libraries in the United States
