= Jonas Howe =

American politician

Member of the Massachusetts House of Representatives from the Petersham, Worcester district
- In office 1845–1845

Personal details
- Born: July 15, 1786 Petersham, Massachusetts
- Died: January 8, 1865 (aged 78) Petersham, Massachusetts
- Spouse(s): Arethusa Nagus (1789- ?); Abigail (Bigelow) Brooks (1797-1883)
- Children: Jonas Holland Howe (1821-1898)
- Parent(s): Benjamin Howe (1759-1838); Vashti (Holland) Howe (1761-1838)
- Profession: farmer, merchant, school teacher, state legislator

Jonas Howe (1786–1854) was a farmer and school teacher from Petersham, Massachusetts and member of the Massachusetts House of Representatives, serving in 1845.

== Personal background and family relations ==
Jonas Howe was born in Petersham, Massachusetts on 15 July 1786 to Benjamin Howe (1759-1838) and Vashti (Holland) Howe (1761-1838). Howe married Arethusa Negus, daughter of Joel Negus and Betsy Gould, on 1 December 1816 at Petersham, and was a farmer and school teacher in the town. In 1845 he was elected to a one-year term in the Massachusetts House of Representatives. He had a second wife, Abigail (Bigelow) Brooks (1797-1883). Howe died at his home in Petersham on 8 January 1865. Howe was a direct descendant of John Howe (1602-1680) who arrived in Massachusetts Bay Colony in 1630 from Brinklow, Warwickshire, England and settled in Sudbury, Massachusetts. Jonas Howe was also a descendant of Edmund Rice, an early immigrant to Massachusetts Bay Colony, as follows:

- Jonas Howe, son of
- Benjamin Howe (1759-1838), son of
- Mary Stow (1730-1794), daughter of
- Elizabeth Brigham (1700-1757), daughter of

- Nathan Brigham (1671-1747), son of
- Mary Rice (1646-1695), daughter of
- Henry Rice (1617-1711), son of

- Edmund Rice, (ca1594-1663)
