= Gilman Bigelow Howe =

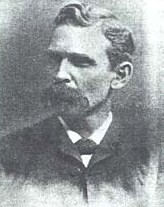
- Gilman Bigelow Howe ca1890
- Born: April 29, 1850; Marlborough, Massachusetts
- Died: January 11, 1933 (aged 82); Washington, D.C., United States
- Known for: Genealogy of New England families; Presidency of the National Genealogical Society
- Spouses: Lena E. Duplessis (m. 1884) Alice Bland Weaver (m. 1919)
- Children: no children

Gilman Bigelow Howe (1850–1933) was an American government official in the employ of the U.S. Department of the Interior and the U.S. Department of Commerce, known for his genealogical work on the families of New England and his 1922 presidency of the National Genealogical Society.

== Biography ==
Gilman Bigelow Howe was born on April 29, 1850, in Marlborough, Massachusetts, as one of two sons of Silas and Ann Gilmore (Snell) Howe. Howe was a direct descendant of John Howe who arrived in Massachusetts Bay Colony in 1630 from Brinklow, Warwickshire, England and settled in Sudbury, Massachusetts. Howe was also a descendant of Edmund Rice another early immigrant to Sudbury, and John Biglo of Watertown, Massachusetts. He lived for a time in East Bridgewater, Massachusetts, and spent much of his life living in Northborough, Massachusetts, serving as town clerk for 12 years and as a member of the town’s Board of Assessors for eight years. From 1900 to 1922 he was in the employ of the United States government in the Department of Interior and the Department of Commerce. Howe was a Mason for 50 years, a member of the Knights Templar, and a life member of the New England Historic Genealogical Society. He served as the President of the National Genealogical Society in 1922. Howe died 11 January 1933 in Washington, D.C., and he was buried in Northborough, Massachusetts.

== Selected publications ==
- Howe, G.B.. (1890). Genealogy of the Bigelow Family of America from the 1642 Marriage of John Biglo and Mary Warren to the Year 1890. Charles Hamilton Printers, Worcester, MA. 517pp.
- Howe, G.B. (1887). Report of the Bigelow Family Reunion, at Lincoln Park, Worcester, Mass. Bigelow Brothers Publishers, Buffalo, NY. 46pp.
