= Jonas H. Howe =

American politician

Jonas Holland Howe

Member of the Minnesota House of Representatives from the 5th district
- In office 1866–1866

Personal details
- Born: April 28, 1821 Petersham, Massachusetts
- Died: October 1, 1898 (aged 77) Plymouth, Minnesota
- Party: Republican
- Spouse: Margaret Adele Swindell
- Parent(s): Jonas Howe (1786-1865); Arethusa Nagus (1789-?)
- Profession: antebellum abolitionist, artist, farmer, state legislator

Jonas Holland Howe (1821-1898) was an antebellum abolitionist, civic leader and artist from Plymouth, Minnesota and a Republican member of the Minnesota House of Representatives, serving in 1866 from the 5th Representative District in Hennepin County.

== Personal background ==
Jonas H. Howe was born in Petersham, Massachusetts on 28 April 1821 to Jonas Howe (1786-1865) and Arethusa (Negus) Howe (1789-1851). He was married on 10 June 1846, to Margaret Adele Swindell at Barre, Massachusetts, and they moved to Minnesota in 1854. Howe was trained as an artist in Massachusetts along with his cousin George Fuller and he was a proficient portrait and landscape artist. In Minnesota, Howe was a staunch abolitionist, and he served in a number of local offices including serving as an officer of the Plymouth Home Guard militia, a Justice of the Peace, and as a School Board member. Later, he was a first sergeant from 1864-65 in Company F of the 11th Minnesota Volunteer Infantry Regiment of the Union Army during the American Civil War.

In 1866 he was elected to a one-year term in the Minnesota House of Representatives in 1866 as a Republican from the 5th Representative District in Hennepin County. He was a close political ally of Ignatius L. Donnelly and was active in the formation and politics of the Populist Party. Howe worked closely with Oliver Hudson Kelley in the founding of The National Grange of the Order of Patrons of Husbandry, commonly known as the Grange, and he was a frequent contributing writer to Farm, Stock and Home, an agricultural newspaper popular in the 1870s. Howe died at his home in Plymouth, Minnesota on 1 October 1898 and was buried at Parker's Lake Cemetery in Plymouth.

== Genealogy and family relations ==
The artistic talent of Jonas H. Howe was traced back as far as his maternal grandparents, Joel and Basmath (Gould) Negus. Of their children, Nathan Negus, was an artist who received some instruction from John Greenwood and John Ritto Penniman. Nathan Negus worked in Boston for a short time, and later in Savannah and Mobile, but he died at Petersham at the age of twenty-four. Joel Negus's daughter Caroline was also a professional artist, although she was perhaps better known as the wife of Richard Hildreth, the historian. Fanny Negus, another daughter of Joel Negus, married Aaron Fuller at Deerfield, Massachusetts, and their son was George Fuller, who was a notable exponent of personal mysticism in painting. It was yet another daughter of Joel Negus, Arethusa, who married Jonas Howe, and Jonas Holland Howe was her second son. Jonas Holland Howe was a direct descendant of John Howe (1602-1680) who arrived in Massachusetts Bay Colony in 1630 from Brinklow, Warwickshire, England and settled in Sudbury, Massachusetts. Jonas Holland Howe was also a descendant of Edmund Rice, an early immigrant to Massachusetts Bay Colony, as follows:

- Jonas Holland Howe, son of

- Jonas Howe (1786-1865), son of
- Benjamin Howe (1759-1838), son of
- Mary Stow (1730-1794), daughter of
- Elizabeth Brigham (1700-1757), daughter of

- Nathan Brigham (1671-1747), son of
- Mary Rice (1646-1695), daughter of
- Henry Rice (1617-1711), son of

- Edmund Rice, (ca1594-1663)
