= Thomas Drury (1668) =

Thomas Drury (1668–1723) was a founder of Framingham, Massachusetts in 1700.

In 1701 Drury was a Deputy of the Great and General Court of Massachusetts as the first representative from Framingham. He also served as selectman, first town clerk, and captain of the militia.

== Personal background ==
Thomas Drury was born on 10 August 1668 to Lieut. John Drury and Mary (Weare) Drury in Boston, Massachusetts. He was the great grandson of Edmund Rice, a 1638 immigrant from England and founder of Sudbury, Massachusetts. Drury married Rachel Rice, his first cousin once removed, daughter of Henry Rice and Elizabeth (Moore) Rice, on 15 December 1687 in Sudbury, and they had nine children. Drury and his family resided in Sudbury for several years before taking up residence in Framingham. In 1701 he was a Deputy of the Great and General Court of Massachusetts as the first representative from Framingham. He served as a selectman in Framingham and as the first Town Clerk. He also served as a captain in the Massachusetts Militia. Thomas Drury died 11 November 1723 in Framingham

His daughter, Mary, married David Bent on 1 January 1713. They had six children.
