= George Hunt Barton =

American geologist and arctic explorer (1852-1933)

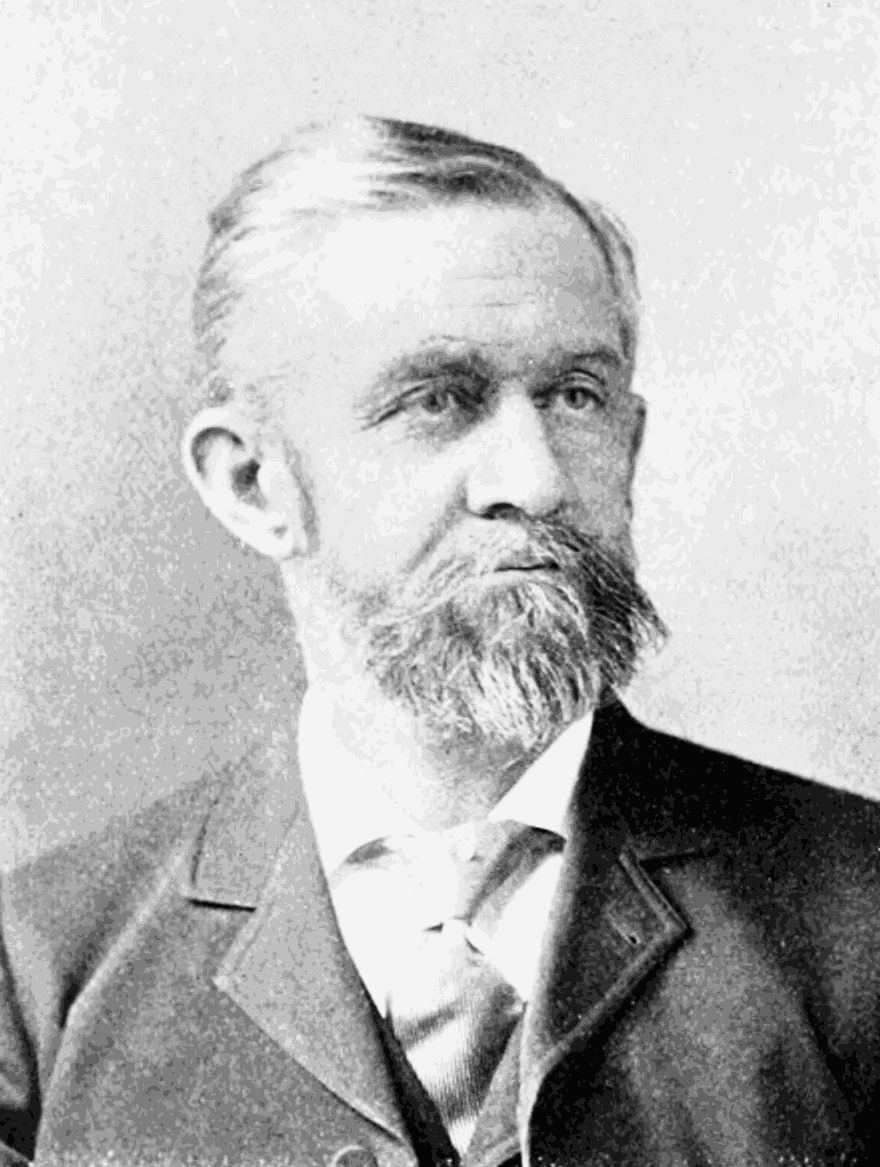
George Hunt Barton

George Hunt Barton (July 8th, 1852 – November 25th, 1933) was an American geologist, arctic explorer, and college professor. He was an alumnus and faculty member in geology at the Massachusetts Institute of Technology, served as the director of the Teachers' School of Science in Boston and was the founding president of the Boston Children's Museum. He was an explorer of Greenland with Robert E. Peary in 1896, and in 1916 was elected a Fellow of the American Academy of Arts and Sciences.

== Early life, education and family ==
George Hunt Barton was born in Sudbury, Massachusetts on July 8th, 1852 to George Washington Barton (1824-1894) and Mary Susan (Hunt) Barton (1828-1863). He studied geology at Massachusetts Institute of Technology (MIT), elected as secretary of his class, and earned a S.B. degree in 1880. Barton married Eva May Beede (1855–1933) on September 18th, 1884 in Stow, Massachusetts, and they had three children: Harold Beede (1887), Donald Clinton (1889–1939), and Helen Mary (1891–1973). Barton is a direct descendant of Phillip Bardens, an early resident of Walpole, Massachusetts. He is also descended from some of the oldest families in Sudbury, his hometown, including Edmund Rice, one of the founders of the town. (Note: George Hunt Barton was an active member of the association of Edmund Rice descendants, serving on the founding board of directors of the Edmund Rice (1638) Association in 1912. His descendancy from Edmund Rice is: Edmund Rice (1595–1663); Edward Rice (1622–1712); John Rice (1651–1719); Abigail Rice (1687–1754); Elisha Wheeler (1711-1785); Mary Wheeler (1733–?); William Hunt (1753-1845); Israel Hunt (1783–?); Mary Susan Hunt (1828–1863); George Hunt Barton (1852–1933).)

== Professional career ==
Barton began his career as a scientific illustrator at MIT after his graduation (1880–81). For two years from 1881 to 1883, he worked as a geologist for the Hawaiian Government Survey in Honolulu, and upon returning to Boston in 1883, he joined the faculty of MIT as an assistant professor and he became an authority on glacial landscapes. He conducted geological investigations of Middlesex and Norfolk Counties in the 1880s and 1890s, and was among the first researchers to recognize the New England landscapes as resulting from ancient glaciation. He also lectured at Boston University, and also served as president of the Appalachian Mountain Club. He was a participant in the sixth expedition of Robert E. Peary to Greenland in 1896. He spent several years on the geological faculty of the Boston Society of Natural History, and in partnership with fellow geologist William Otis Crosby operated a company selling rock and mineral collections to educators. Taking an interest in education of science teachers, Barton began in 1904 serving as the director of the Teachers' School of Science in Boston and was later in 1909 the founding president of the Boston Children's Museum that was originally associated with the School. Barton was a prominent public lecturer around Boston and the New England region at a time when public lectures were the primary medium for public dissemination of scientific knowledge. For his scientific accomplishments in glacial geology and in science education for teachers, he was elected as a Fellow of the American Academy of Arts and Sciences in 1916.

== Death and family legacy ==
Barton died on November 25th, 1933 while lecturing in Cambridge, Massachusetts, and is buried in the Barton family cemetery on the old family farm in Sudbury. Barton's son, Donald Clinton Barton (1889–1939) earned his Ph.D. in Geology from Harvard University in 1914. From 1927 to 1934 he operated his own business as a consulting geologist, and from 1934 until his death as a research geophysicist for the Humble Oil and Refining Company. He was a pioneer in the application of geophysical principles in the exploration for petroleum.
