= Laura North Rice =

Laura North Rice (January 27, 1920 – July 18, 2004) was a notable scholar in the field of psychology.

== Biography ==
Rice was born in Springfield, Massachusetts, the third child of Horace Jacobs Rice and Mildred Ketchum Rice.

Rice earned a master's degree in Education from Springfield College in 1949 and a PhD from the University of Chicago in 1955.

She taught first at the University of Chicago and then at York University in Toronto, Ontario beginning in 1968. She retired in 1986, but continued to work at the university until 1993.

She was at the forefront of psychological research regarding therapy. She received the Distinguished Research Career Award from the Society for Psychotherapy Research. The same society now gives the Laura N. Rice Memorial Award annually for post doctoral research travel.

Her books include: Facilitating Emotional Change: The Moment-by-Moment Process, and Innovations in Client-centered Therapy.
