= Willard Rice =

American ice hockey player (1895–1967)

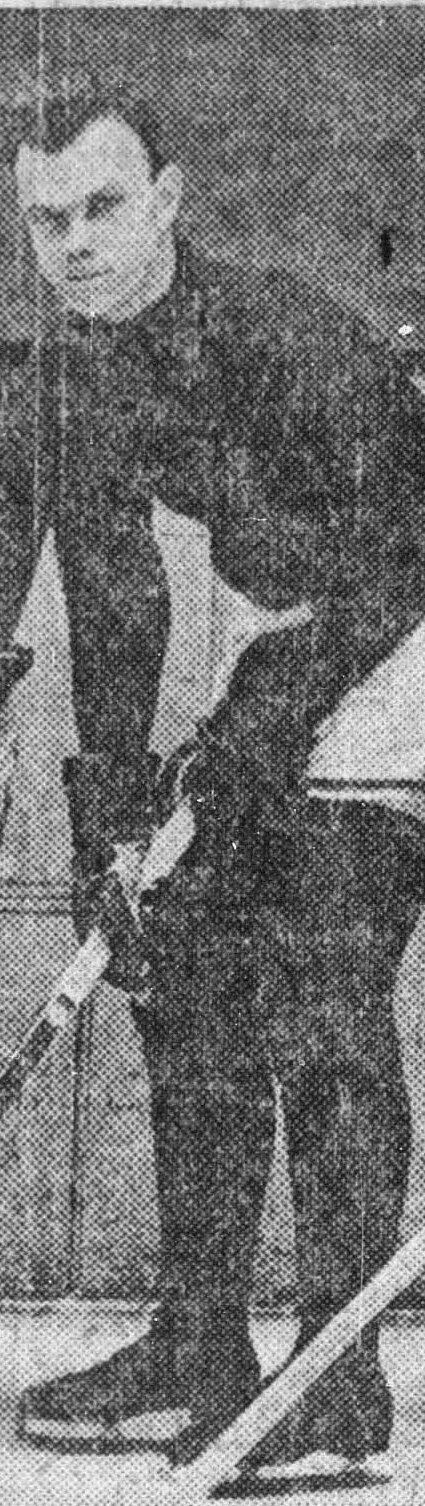
- Born: April 21, 1895 Newton, Massachusetts, US
- Died: July 21, 1967 (aged 72) Weston, Massachusetts, US
- Position: Left wing
- National team: United States
- Playing career: 1914–1926
Medal record
Men's ice hockey
Representing the United States
Olympic Games
Silver medal – second place	1924 Chamonix	Team competition

Willard Wadsworth Rice (April 21, 1895 – July 21, 1967) was an American ice hockey player who competed in the 1924 Winter Olympics.

Rice was born in Newton, Massachusetts the son of Abbott Barnes Rice, a Massachusetts legislator, and Amy Thurber (Bridges) Rice. He was a graduate of Harvard University in 1922. Rice played hockey with the Boston Athletic Association team in the 1920s and 1930s that played at the Boston Arena. He was a member of the American ice hockey team in the 1924 Winter Olympics that won the silver medal. Rice had a career as an executive with a soap manufacturing company. He died in Weston, Massachusetts on 21 July 1967.
