= Frederick H. Rindge =

American businessman (1857–1905)

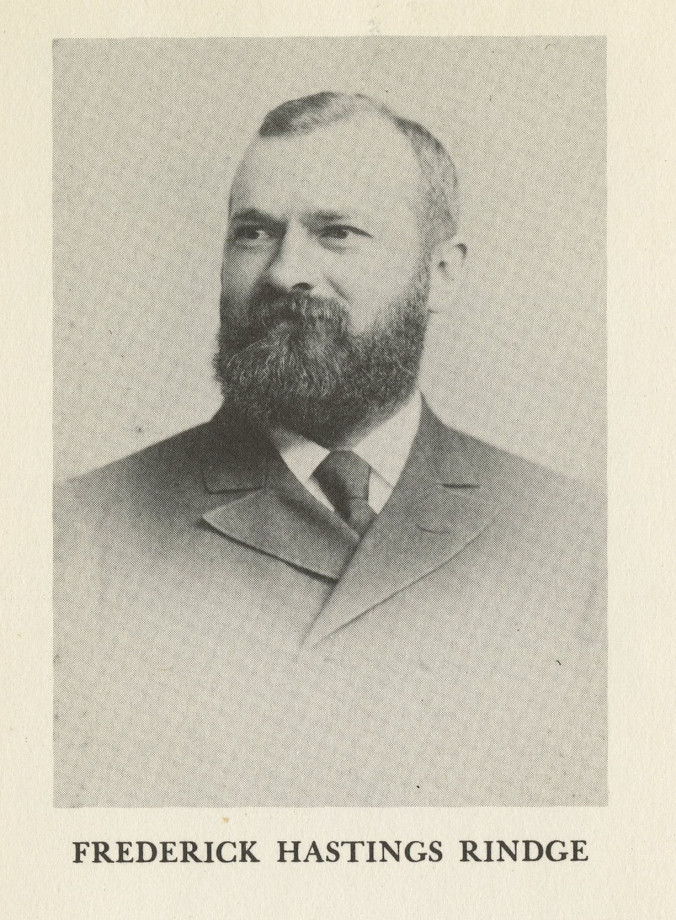
- Born: Frederick Hastings Rindge; December 21, 1857; Cambridge, Massachusetts, US
- Died: August 29, 1905 (aged 47); Yreka, California, US
- Resting place: Angelus-Rosedale Cemetery
- Education: Harvard University
- Occupations: Businessman, industrialist, real estate developer, philanthropist
- Known for: Philanthropy; founding of Malibu, California
- Title: King of Malibu
- Spouse: Rhoda May Knight (m. 1887)

Frederick Hastings Rindge (December 21, 1857 – August 29, 1905) was an American business magnate, patriarch of the Rindge family, real estate developer, philanthropist, and writer, of Los Angeles, California. He was a major benefactor to his hometown of Cambridge, Massachusetts, and a founder of present-day Malibu, California.

Frederick Rindge was also the only surviving son of banking and shipping tycoon Samuel B. Rindge and Mrs. Clarissa Harrington Rindge. Frederick and his wife, Rhoda, came to be informally known as the King and Queen of Malibu, and with an estimated net worth in the millions of dollars, the family was considered one of the wealthiest in the US.

== Early life ==
Rindge was born in Cambridge on December 21, 1857, the only surviving son among the six children of Samuel B. Rindge (1820–1883) and Clarissa Harrington (December 8, 1822 – January 4, 1885). His siblings, including a brother named Henry and a sister named Mary, all died of scarlet fever, also known as rheumatic fever. He grew up in the "Rindge mansion", still standing at the corner of Dana and Harvard streets in Cambridge, but spent vast swathes of his childhood very ill, condemned to bed with swollen joints, body spasms, a wildly irregular heartbeat, and other ailments. Bible stories were of some solace to him, with "tales of men defeating long odds because God was on their side" rooting him in faith and religion from a young age.

=== Education and travels ===
Rindge entered Harvard College in 1875, joining the Art Club, Glee Club, and Hasty Pudding Club, and rising to the top of his class as an inductee of the Institute of 1770, "one of the most important social honors on campus" whose purpose was "to identify the one hundred members of each class most fit to join society, all by a process of cascading elections." His appointment opened the door for him to join the A.D. Club and the Alpha chapter of the Delta Kappa Epsilon Fraternity, "one of the oldest and most exclusive final clubs on campus" in which he met and became close friends with fraternity brother, Theodore Roosevelt, whose conquest of his own health ailments inspired Rindge, leading to his realization that "he, too, was strong enough to travel the world and seek out the experiences that would give him the sense of making up for lost time." Rindge's travels began with a journey across the Atlantic on the SS Baltic. He then traversed England, France, and Germany, among his many stops. Upon returning to America and Harvard, he soon fell ill again and was forced to drop out of school, moving back in with his family. He was so severely ill that his doctor suggested he might find a better chance of survival if he sought out a warmer climate than Massachusetts could offer, which led him to St. Augustine, Florida. As he was again on the upswing of recuperation, he explored the town, then quite remote, and even partook of some amateur excavation of long-abandoned native Timucua villages. Later, in Colorado, he would spend a brief period as a sheep rancher.

In 1883, Rindge inherited his father's estate, then worth nearly $2 million ($140 million in 2016 dollars), from his father's investments in textile mills and real estate.

=== Business ventures ===
Rindge founded the Conservative Life Insurance Company (now Pacific Life) and became vice-president of Union Oil Company and director of the Los Angeles Edison Electric Company (later Southern California Edison Company). His investments included land near Stockton, California and real estate holdings in the San Fernando Valley of Los Angeles, and the state of Sinaloa, Mexico.

He was President of the Harvard Club of Los Angeles and a member of many historical, archaeological, patriotic, and religious organizations which mirrored his interests.

== Personal life ==
In 1887, Rindge married 22-year-old Rhoda May Knight (1864–1941) of Michigan. They moved to Wilshire and Ocean Avenue in Santa Monica and then built a home at 2263 Harvard Boulevard in Los Angeles, known today as the Frederick Hastings Rindge House; weekends and summers were spent at their Malibu estate. They had three children.

Frederick H. Rindge died in Yreka, California on the morning of August 29, 1905. He had fallen ill while visiting a silver mine there. His body was transported via train to Southern California. A service was held at the Rindge home in West Adams Heights, followed by another short service after his funeral procession to his place of burial, Angelus-Rosedale Cemetery.

== Philanthropic pursuits ==
=== Cambridge, Massachusetts ===
In 1887, Mayor William Russell of Cambridge, a Harvard friend, requested Rindge's help in funding a new public library. Rindge responded in July 1887 with an offer of land and full funding for Cambridge's public library. Later that year he enlarged his offer to include three additional buildings: a new city hall (now the Cambridge City Hall), the Rindge Technical School, and a proposed high school (not built). He also paid the bulk of the costs for the Harvard-Epworth United Methodist Church. Today Rindge is commemorated in Cambridge through the Cambridge Rindge and Latin School, formed in 1977 by the merger of the Rindge Technical School with Cambridge High and Latin School, as well as Rindge Avenue, Rindgefield Street, and Rindge Towers, low-income apartment buildings.

=== Southern California ===
Rindge moved to Los Angeles, California, in 1887. In 1892, Rindge purchased the 13,315.7-acre (53.887 km^{2}) Spanish land grant Rancho Topanga Malibu Sequit or "Malibu Rancho", in Malibu, California. He later expanded it to 17,000 acres (69 km^{2}) as Rindge Ranch. He and his wife, May, first stayed in a small cabin on it that had been built by one of the ranch's previous owners, Matthew Keller, naming it Oak Cottage. He then built a three-story Victorian mansion on the property in 1893, surrounding it with orange groves and vegetable fields.

A supporter of the temperance movement, Rindge reimbursed the city of Santa Monica for the loss of license fees when Santa Monica abolished saloons. He established the First Methodist Episcopal Church of Santa Monica. He wrote several self-published books which were spiritual and meditative in nature.

== Selected works ==
- Can You Read Your Title Clear to a Mansion in the Skies? (1889)
- Thoughts Concerning Ourselves and Our Interests (1890)
- Meditations on Many Matters (1890)
- Happy Days in Southern California, 222 pgs., Cambridge, MA and Los Angeles, CA, 1898. Reprinted by Nabu Press, 2010. ISBN 978-1145362505
- The Best Way (1902)

== See also ==
- Frederick Hastings Rindge House
- Rindge Dam
- Malibu, California
- Santa Monica Mountains National Recreation Area
- Malibu Potteries
- Rindge Co. v. County of Los Angeles 262 U.S. 700 (1923)
- Adamson House (section Rindge-Adamson family)
- Hueneme, Malibu and Port Los Angeles Railway (The railroad that the Rindges built through Malibu)
- Rhoda May Knight Rindge
- Rhoda Adamson
