= Milton E. Lord =

American librarian and academic (1898–1985)

- Lord in 1948

President of the American Library Association
- In office 1949–1950
- Preceded by: Errett Weir McDiarmid
- Succeeded by: Clarence R. Graham

Personal details
- Born: Milton Edward Lord; June 12, 1898 Lynn, Massachusetts, US
- Died: February 12, 1985 (aged 86) Salem, Massachusetts, US
- Education: Harvard University
- Occupation: Librarian

Milton Edward Lord (June 12, 1898 – February 12, 1985) was an American librarian and academic who was president of the American Library Association from 1949 to 1950.

== Education and Career ==
Lord studied engineering at Harvard University, graduating in 1919. He chose to study Library Science after serving as a part-time assistant in the library for several years.

He acted as librarian of Harvard Union in Cambridge, Massachusetts before spending a year at the Ecole des Sciences Politiques in Paris in 1925. He went on to spend four years in Italy as a librarian of the American Academy in Rome, where he participated in an effort to recatalog the Vatican Library.

In 1930, Lord became a professor and director of university libraries at the University of Iowa. He also directed the library school at the University of Iowa.

Lord left Iowa in 1932 to become Director of the Boston Public Library, where he stayed until he retired in 1965.

== Selected Publications ==
- Lord, Milton Edward; Shaffer, Kenneth R. (1945). The Devastated Libraries of the World. Cambridge, MA: Harvard Alumni Association.
- Gregory, Winifred (1938). Gregory, Winifred (ed.). International Congresses and Conferences, 1840–1937: A Union List of Their Publications Available in Libraries of the United States and Canada. Under the auspices of the Bibliographical Society of America; committee: James Thayer Gerould (chairman), Harry Miller Lydenberg, Milton Edward Lord. New York: H. W. Wilson Company.
- Lord, Milton E. (1970). "Boston Public Library". Encyclopedia of Library and Information Science. Vol. 3. New York: Marcel Dekker. pp. 100–104.

Non-profit organization positions
Preceded by Errett Weir McDiarmid	President of the American Library Association; 1949–1950	Succeeded by Clarence R. Graham
