= Caleb Thomas Winchester =

American English scholar

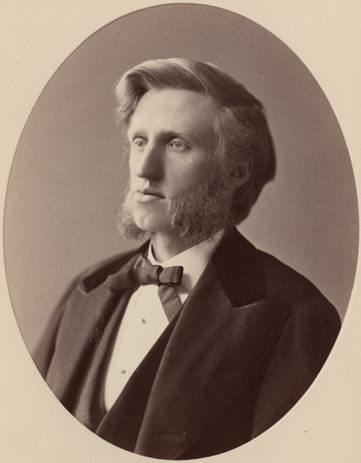
Caleb Thomas Winchester

Caleb Thomas Winchester (January 18, 1847 – March 24, 1920) was an American English scholar.

== Biography ==
He was born in Montville, Connecticut. He prepared for college at Wilbraham Academy in Wilbraham, Massachusetts. He then attended Wesleyan University, where he graduated in 1869. He remained at Wesleyan, where he was librarian until 1873, professor of rhetoric and English literature until 1890, and simply professor of English literature after that. During 1880-81 he studied in Leipzig, Germany. He was noted for the quality of his lectures.

He married Julia Stackpole Smith in 1872. She died in 1877, and he married Alice Goodwin Smith in 1880.

== Works ==
He wrote:

- Some Principles of Literary Criticism (1899)
- Life of John Wesley (1906)
- A Group of English Essayists (1910)
- Wordsworth — How to Know Him (1916)
- An Old Castle and other essays (1922)

Besides serving on the deliberative assembly which revised The Methodist Hymnal, he edited:

- Selected Essays of Joseph Addison (1886, 1890)
- Five Short Courses of Reading in English Literature (1892; third edition, revised, 1911)
- The Sir Roger de Coverley Papers (1904)
- Representative English Essays (1914)
