= William Grant Seaman =

American clergyman (1866–1944)

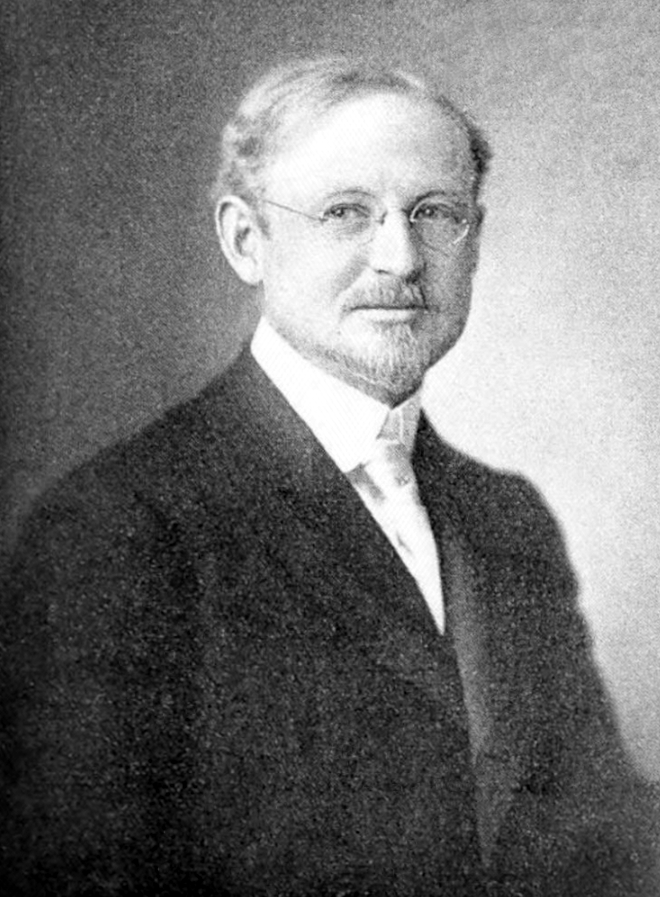
- Born: November 2, 1866; Wakarusa, Indiana, US
- Died: April 7, 1942 (aged 75); Lexington, Kentucky, US
- Education: Depauw University
- Spouse: Laura Owen Rice (m. 1907)
- Children: 3

William Grant Seaman (November 2, 1866 – April 7, 1942) was a notable Methodist Episcopal minister, academic, and leader in "civic and social causes," including the City Methodist Church in Gary, Indiana.

== Early life and education ==
He was born in Wakarusa, Indiana to Joseph Washington Seaman and Sarah Margaret Uline. He studied at Fort Wayne Methodist Academy and graduated from Depauw University in 1891, and was a member of Beta Theta Pi and Phi Beta Kappa. He earned a PhD from Boston University in 1897. He was given a D.D. degree from Depauw in 1918.

== Career ==
Seaman sang in the Depauw Male Quartet before being ordained as a Methodist minister in Anderson, Indiana. He was minister in Sudbury, Massachusetts from 1893 to 1898, State Street M.E. Church in Springfield, Massachusetts from 1898 to 1900, and Wesley Church in Salem, Massachusetts from 1900 to 1904. He was a chair of Philosophy at Depauw University from 1904 to 1912 before becoming president of Dakota Wesleyan University in the latter year.

Beginning in 1916, he was the minister of the City Methodist Church in Gary, Indiana. He led an effort to build a large new church, the largest Methodist church in the midwest, largely through donations from U.S. Steel. He was transferred to Ohio, and died in a car accident in Lexington, Kentucky on April 7, 1942. His ashes were eventually interred in the City Methodist Church.

== Family life ==
Seaman married Laura Owen Rice in Newton, Massachusetts on June 28, 1907. She was the daughter of The Rev. Dr. Charles Francis Rice and Miriam Owen Rice. She was born in Springfield, Massachusetts in 1876, attended Cambridge Rindge and Latin School and Vassar College, where she elected to Phi Beta Kappa. She was director of the Springfield YMCA from 1900 to 1904. She was a member of the Associated Alumnae of Vassar College, National Child Labor Committee, the Edmund Rice (1638) Association, the Greencastle Women's Club, the Greencastle Art Club, the Springfield, MA College Club.

Their children were Miriam Seaman (born 1908), William Rice Seaman (born 1909), and Charles Francis Seaman (born 1912).
