= City Methodist Church =

City Methodist Church, Gary
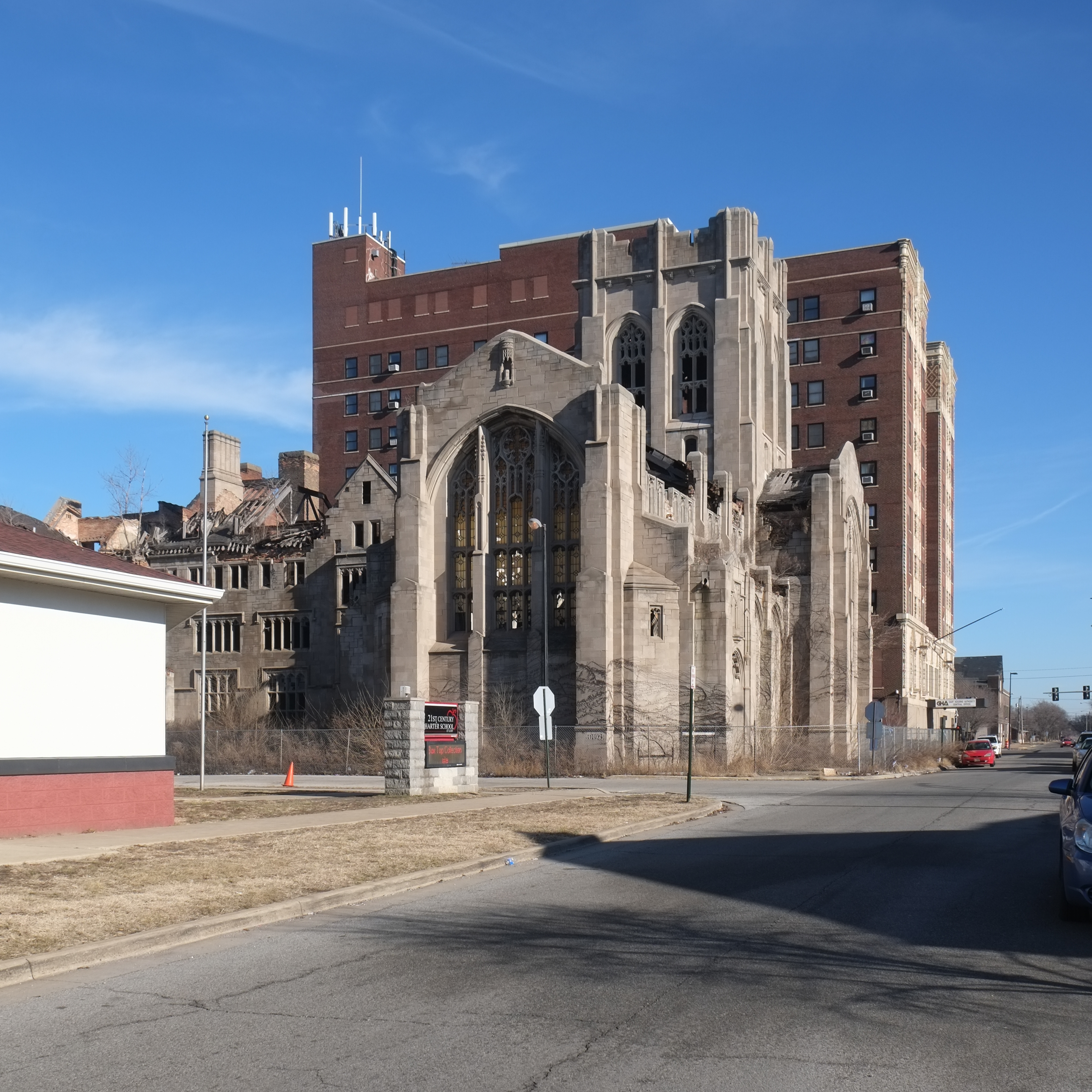
- The church in 2019
- City Methodist Church, Gary
- 41.600429°N 87.338431°W
- Denomination: Methodist

History
- Status: Derelict
- Founded: 1925
- Founder: Dr. William Grant Seaman

Architecture
- Functional status: Defunct
- Architect(s): Lowe & Bollenbacher
- Style: Gothic Revival
- Groundbreaking: January 25, 1925
- Completed: 1926
- Construction cost: $800,000
- Closed: October 5, 1975

Specifications
- Capacity: 3000
- Materials: stone

The City Methodist Church, latterly known as City United Methodist Church is a disused church in Gary, Indiana, United States. Once the largest Methodist church in the Midwest, it ceased as a place of worship in 1975, after just over 50 years of use.

== History ==
A Methodist church had been present in Gary since 1906 (also the year of the city's founding). In 1916, Dr William Grant Seaman became its pastor. Seaman envisaged a much larger church to serve the town, wanting to bring a prominent religious presence into what was then a neighbourhood with numerous brothels and drinking establishments. Seaman secured the backing of US Steel, the chief employer in the city. The company donated the site on which the church was to be built, and agreed to donate almost half of the cost. The construction, beginning in 1925, took 21 months and cost $800,000, a large sum at the time. The first service was held in the church on October 3, 1926. The organ was donated by Elbert Gary, after whom the city was named.

The church was built by Lowe and Bollenbacher of Chicago. The sanctuary at the forefront of the structure is part of a much larger nine-story complex which included an adjoining theatre called Seaman Hall, which could seat 1000 people, and contained corporate offices, a gymnasium, a Sunday School and a dining hall. There were plans for a bowling alley, but this was never built. A rooftop garden on the roof of the hall was never finished. By 1927, the church had a congregation of 1,700 and a staff of six.

By 1929, William Seaman had grown unpopular with his parishioners, due at least in part to his interests in cultural diversity (including interfaith pageants). His dissatisfied congregation had him involuntarily transferred to Ohio. His successor proved even less popular with the churchgoers. Seaman died in 1944. In accordance with his wishes, his ashes were returned to Gary, where they were interred in the church.

During the Great Depression, the church leased part of Seaman Hall to Gary College to gain much-needed additional funds. In the postwar years, the Indiana University Center used part of Seaman Hall, and by 1949, Indiana University Northwest occupied three of the floors. The church reached the pinnacle of its popularity in the 1950s, with membership surpassing 3000.

== Decline and closure ==
After Gary declined in the 1960s and 70s, the church's fortunes began to likewise crumble. Predominantly a white middle-class institution, the church lost large numbers of parishioners to white flight as Gary's social makeup altered and better-off inhabitants moved away. Crime rates in the area soared, causing more departures, and maintenance costs were ruinous, owing to the church's huge dimensions and the harsh lakefront climate. By 1973, there were only 320 members in the then-aging congregation, about a third of whom regularly attended. After attempts to sell the building to another congregation proved fruitless, the decision was eventually taken to close the church in 1975.

== After closure ==
The structure passed into the hands of Indiana University, which continued to use part of Seaman Hall as a satellite campus, but nothing was done with the church itself. By the 1990s, the church was already starting to decay, but was then severely damaged by a fire in 1997, which accelerated the deterioration even further.

The church is a popular destination for urban exploration (though permits are now required) and has even been the location of goth weddings in recent years.

== Future ==
The complex is still standing, but much is beyond any realistic restoration, and has been placed on Indiana Landmarks' 10 Most Endangered Places in Indiana list. Most of the interior fixtures have been removed by thieves. In 2011, part of the roof of the sanctuary collapsed. In 2014, the city authorities revived an aborted plan from the early 2000s to turn the site into a large park in which the sanctuary would be the centrepiece, and to demolish the rest of the complex.

== Gallery ==
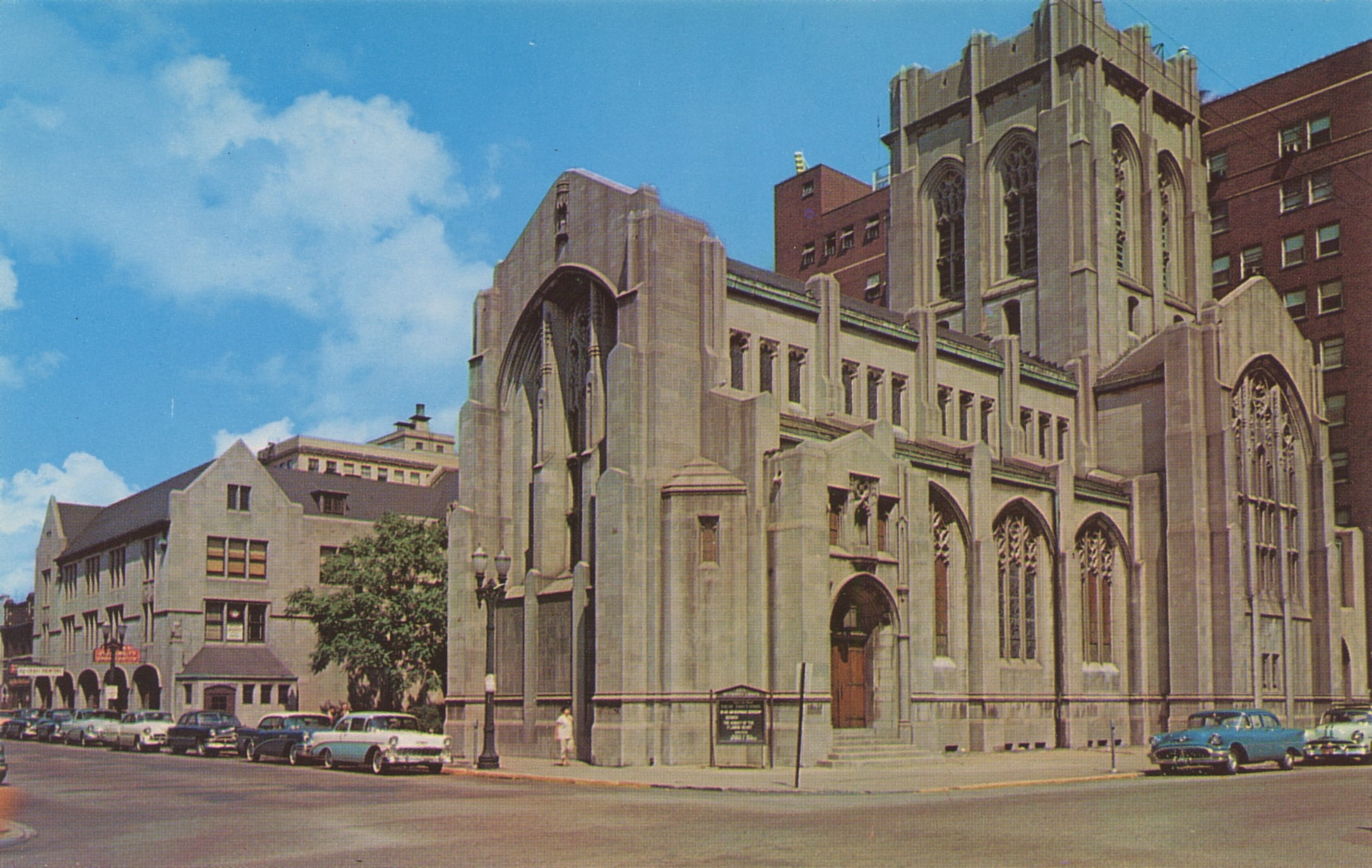
City Methodist Church, circa 1955

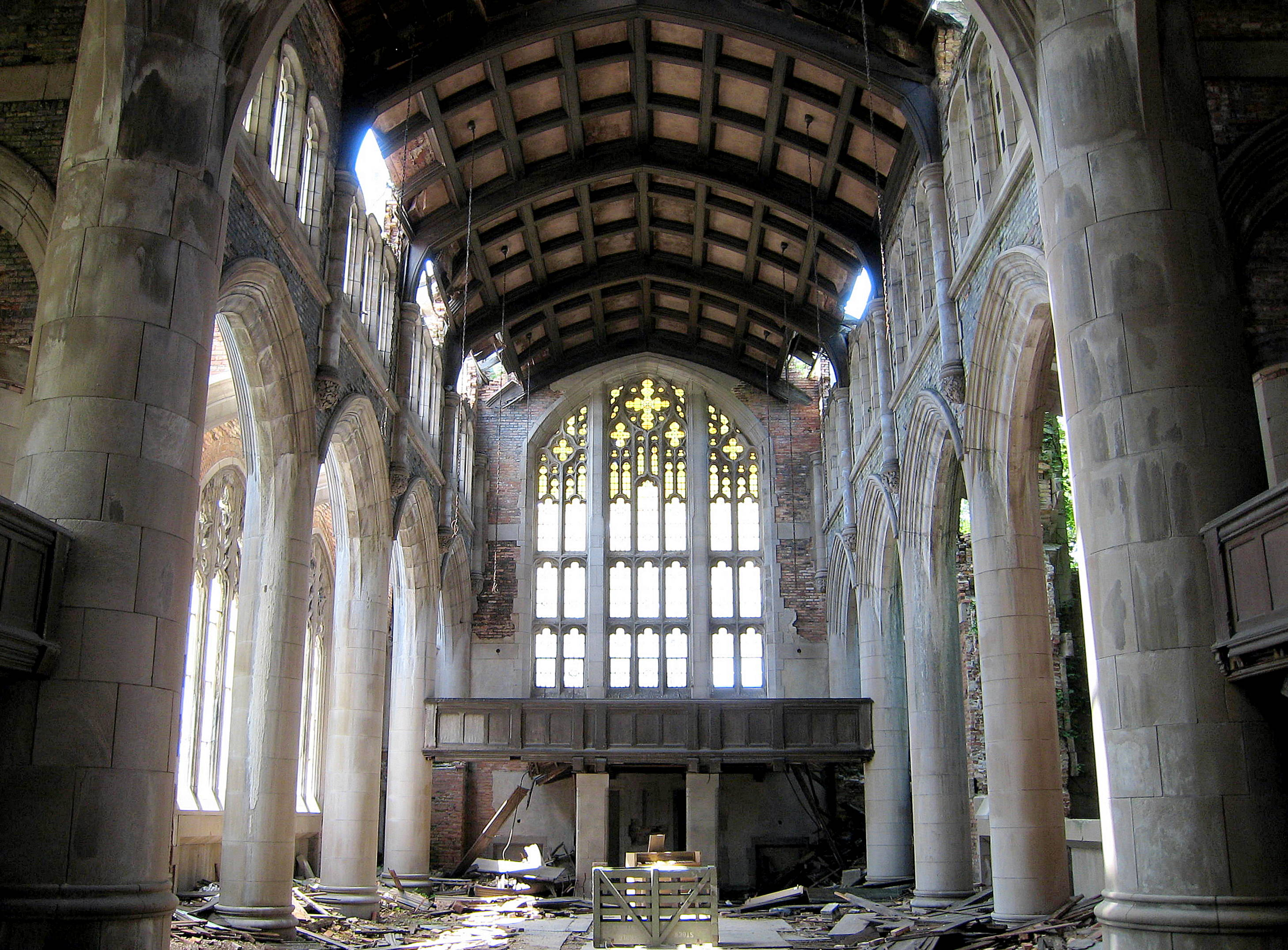
Interior in 2009. The section of roof nearest the window has since collapsed
