= Lonsdale =

Lonsdale may refer to:

== Places ==
=== Australia ===
- Lonsdale Street, Melbourne, Victoria
- Lonsdale, South Australia, an industrial suburb of Adelaide
- Point Lonsdale, a coastal township in Victoria

=== Canada ===
- Lonsdale Quay, Vancouver, British Columbia
- Lonsdale Tunnel, North Vancouver, British Columbia
- Lower Lonsdale, North Vancouver
- North Vancouver-Lonsdale, a provincial electoral district in British Columbia
- Upper Lonsdale, North Vancouver

=== United Kingdom ===
- Lonsdale, the valley of the River Lune in Lancashire and Cumbria, England
- Kirkby Lonsdale, a small town in Cumbria, England
- Lonsdale Hundred, a hundred of the historic English county of Lancashire through which the River Lune flowed
- Lonsdale (UK Parliament constituency), a parliamentary constituency from 1918 to 1950
- Lonsdale College, Lancaster, a constituent college of Lancaster University, England
- Lonsdale Square, London
- Lonsdale Road, Oxford
- Lonsdale Road Reservoir, Barnes, London
- Morecambe and Lonsdale (UK Parliament constituency), a parliamentary constituency from 1950 to 1983
- Morecambe and Lunesdale (UK Parliament constituency), a parliamentary constituency created in 1983
- North Lonsdale (UK Parliament constituency), a parliamentary constituency from 1885 to 1918
- North Lonsdale Rural District, a local government area until 1974, renamed from Ulverston RD in 1960
- Westmorland and Lonsdale (UK Parliament constituency), a parliamentary constituency created in 1983

=== United States ===
Listed alphabetically by state

- Lonsdale, Arkansas, a town in Garland County, Arkansas
- Lonsdale, Minnesota, a city in Rice County, Minnesota
- Lonsdale, Rhode Island, a village and historic district in Providence County, Rhode Island
  - Lonsdale Sports Arena, a race track that operated in Rhode Island from 1947 to 1956
- Lonsdale, Knoxville, Tennessee, a neighborhood in Knoxville, Tennessee

== Other uses ==
- Lonsdale (surname)
- Earl of Lonsdale, a title created twice: 1784–1802 in the Peerage of Great Britain and since 1807 in the Peerage of the United Kingdom
- The Lonsdale Sisters, Pauline Cingalee & Florence Samuels, English dancing duo in the 1940s and 1950s
- A vitola of cigar named after the 5th Earl of Lonsdale
- Lonsdale (clothing), British boxing, mixed martial arts and clothing brand
- Lonsdale (car), defunct British automobile brand
- Lonsdale Belt, British boxing prize
- Lonsdale College, a fictional Oxford college attended by Inspector Morse
- Lonsdale Cup, British horse race
- Lonsdaleite, an allotrope of diamond found in meteorites
- HMAS Lonsdale, a ship and a naval depot of the Royal Australian Navy
- HMVS Londsale, torpedo boat of the Victorian Naval Forces (Australia)
