= Ian Potter =

Australian businessman (1902–1994)

Sir Ian Potter
- Potter at the conferring of his honorary doctorate, 15 December 1973
- Born: William Ian Potter; 25 July 1902; Sydney, Australia
- Died: 24 October 1994 (aged 92); Melbourne, Australia
- Education: University of Sydney
- Occupations: Entrepreneur; Stockbroker; Naval Officer; Investor; Philanthropist
- Years active: 1935–1992
- Title: Founder, W.I. Potter (1935), Ian Potter & Co. (1937); Founding board member, Howard Florey Institute; Founder, Ian Potter Foundation (1964)
- Spouse: Primrose Anderson-Stuart (m. 1974)
- Children: 2 daughters (Robin Potter and Carolyn Parker Bowles)
- Military career
- Allegiance: Australia
- Branch: Royal Australian Navy / Naval Auxiliary Patrol
- Service years: 1942–1946
- Rank: Staff Skipper (Sub Lieutenant)
- Units: HMAS Lonsdale, Port Melbourne
- Commands: HMAS Nordecia
- Conflicts: Second World War

Sir William Ian Potter (25 August 1902 – 24 October 1994), known as Ian Potter, was an Australian stockbroker, businessman and philanthropist. Potter was knighted in 1962. The Ian Potter Foundation, which he established in 1964, has made grants to research institutes, charities, universities and arts organisations. Since 1993, the Ian Potter Cultural Trust has awarded grants to individuals in the arts.

== Early life and education ==
Potter was the third child of James W. Potter and Maria Louisa Townsend McWhinnie, who was born in Glasgow in June 1869. Potter's parents married in Sydney, in June 1899, then returned to England in 1903 with their three children. Returning to Sydney, he attended Mortdale Public School before winning a scholarship to Cleveland Street Intermediate High School in Redfern.

Potter served as a lieutenant with the Australian Army's Citizens Military Forces (CMF) between 1920 and 1922.

He studied economics at the University of Sydney, where he excelled and graduated at the top of his year.

== Career ==
Upon graduation, Potter moved to Melbourne to take on a position as economist with stockbroker Edward Dyason, a successful mining entrepreneur and trained economist. In 1933, Potter began an eighteen-month period as a Treasury economist in Canberra providing him with an intimate knowledge of government finance. He also made many contacts in politics and the federal bureaucracy.

Upon his return to Melbourne in 1935, Potter established his own stockbroking firm, W.I. Potter, and then from 1937, Ian Potter & Co.

=== World War II ===
Potter continued his business interests during the war while training for, and serving in, the Naval Auxiliary Patrol (NAP). Like many small motor vessel owners, Potter volunteered his own boat, the MV Nordecia, to the NAP. Nordecia was later commissioned as HMAS Nordecia, carrying the bow number 624. Nordecia was fitted with a machine gun and depth charges. Enlisting on 17 August 1942, Potter trained as a Royal Australian Navy Volunteer Reserve (RANVR) cadet. He was commissioned as a Staff Skipper with substantive rank of Sub Lieutenant on 8 May 1944, and stationed at HMAS Lonsdale, Port Melbourne, until his discharge on 31 May 1946. Following the war, the members of the NAP established the Little Ship Club to maintain the skills acquired during their service. In 1949, King George VI approved warrants for the award by the Royal Navy of the Blue Ensign (Defaced) to the Little Ship Club, and to Potter's HMAS Nordecia as well as the San Vittoria and Mauranne, for service during the war. This is the only award of the Blue Ensign (Defaced) to an Australian boat club for wartime service. The Blue Ensign (Defaced) included a light blue coloured circle representing the dawn, within which a five-pointed star represents the guiding star of their overnight patrols around Port Philip Bay.

== Other roles ==
Potter was the chairman of several boards, including the Australian Ballet, the Australian Opera and the Australian Elizabethan Theatre Trust. He was elected a fellow of the Australian Academy of Science in 1978.

== Honours and awards ==
- Knight Bachelor (Imperial), 1962
- War Medal 1939-45
- Australian Service Medal 1939-45
- Queen Elizabeth II Coronation Medal, 1953
- Royal Order of the Polar Star (Sweden), 1983

- Honorary degree of doctor of laws by the University of Melbourne, 1973
- Honorary fellow of the Australian Stock Exchange, 1991,
- Honorary life member of the AETT, Australian Ballet Foundation, Australian Opera, and National Gallery of Victoria

== Ian Potter Foundation and Cultural Trust ==
The Ian Potter Foundation was established by Potter in 1964, inspired by the Myer Foundation, as he was friends with Ken Myer, eldest son of Sidney Myer. That partnership also led to the establishment of the Howard Florey Institute at the University of Melbourne. Potter's vision was to support youth, and as of 2022 the foundation awards over A$20 million in grants annually, across a range of sectors. It adopted the seahorse as its logo.

The Ian Potter Cultural Trust came about after the Australian Elizabethan Theatre Trust was placed in liquidation in 1991. The foundation had previously been able to support individual artists by supporting this organisation, but its tax status prevented it from giving grants directly to individuals. In October 1992 the Ian Potter Cultural Trust was established, specifically to give grants to individual artists. The first grants were approved in June 1993.

== Personal life ==
Potter married four times. On 5 April 1928, he wed Victoria Bernice Moorhead in Mosman Presbyterian Church. He divorced his first wife in 1941 and on 2 July 1942, and married Gwenyth Winifred Izzard, an amateur actress, at the Cairns Memorial Presbyterian Church in East Melbourne. He divorced his second wife on the grounds of desertion. On 5 February 1955, he wed Patricia Ann Garvan (née Fitzgerald). This marriage also ended in divorce. On 27 March 1975, he married Primrose Catherine Dunlop (née Anderson Stuart) in the Chapel of St George the Martyr HMAS Watson at South Head, Vaucluse, New South Wales.

On his death, his fourth wife and a daughter from each of his first and second marriages survived him.

== Legacy ==
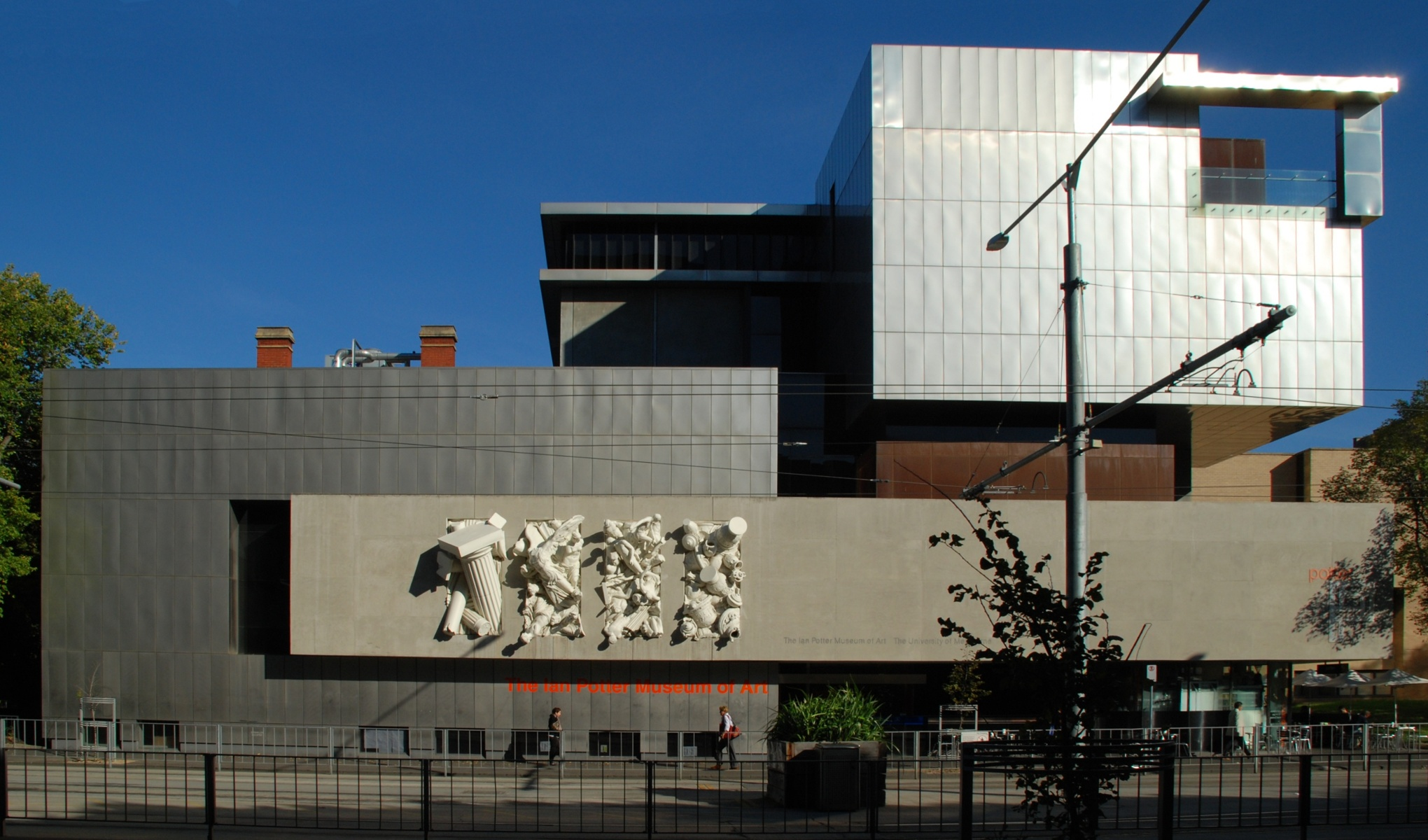
Exterior of the Ian Potter Museum of Art

Institutions and places named after Potter include:

- Ian Potter Centre at Federation Square (part of the National Gallery of Victoria), Melbourne
- Ian Potter Museum of Art at the University of Melbourne, Parkville campus
- Ian Potter Children's Garden at the Royal Botanic Gardens, Melbourne
- Ian Potter Southbank Centre at the University of Melbourne, Southbank campus
- Ian Potter Gallery at the Chau Chak Wing Museum, University of Sydney
- Ian Potter Sculpture Court at the Monash University Museum of Art, Melbourne
- Ian Potter Centre for Performing Arts at Monash University, Clayton campus, Melbourne
- Ian Potter State Theatre at Arts Centre Melbourne
