= West Main Street Historic District (Westborough, Massachusetts) =

Historic district in Massachusetts, United States

- U.S. National Register of Historic Places
- U.S. Historic district
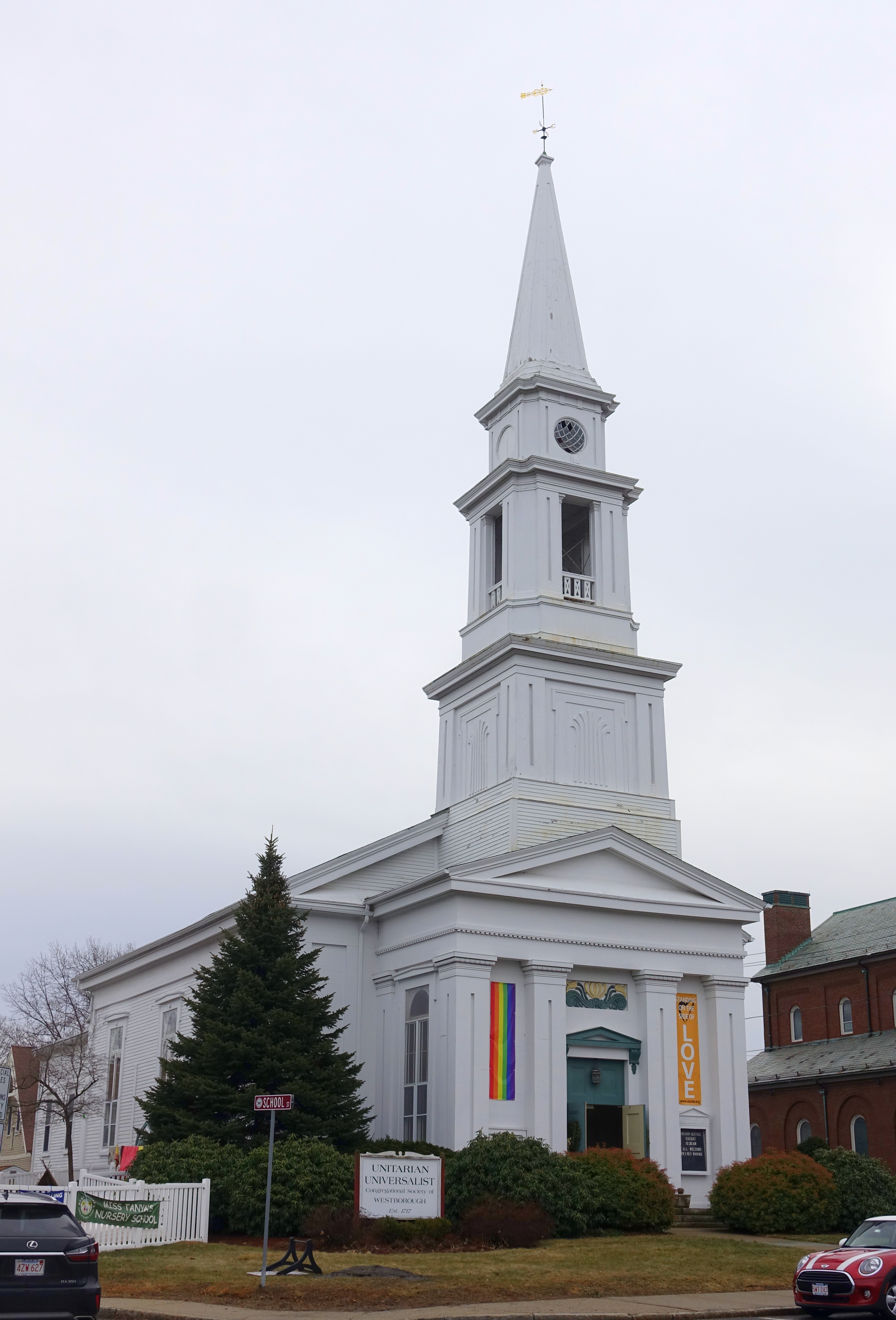
- Westborough's Unitarian Universalist Congregational Society

- Location within Massachusetts Location within the United States
- Location: Roughly bounded by Milk, Main, Blake, and Fay Sts., Westborough, Massachusetts
- Coordinates: 42.26898°N 71.61819°W
- Area: 45 acres (18 ha)
- Architectural style: Greek Revival, Late Victorian
- NRHP reference No.: 87000884 (original); 90001851 (increase 1); 05001516 (increase 2); 09000196 (increase 3)

Significant dates
- Added to NRHP: June 16, 1987
- Boundary increases: December 6, 1990; January 11, 2006; May 29, 2009

The West Main Street Historic District of Westborough, Massachusetts is an expansive historic district that encompasses a large residential portion of the historic center of the town, as well as part of its commercial center.

When first listed on the National Register of Historic Places in 1987, the district included West Main Street from its junction with Milk and South Streets (Massachusetts Route 135), west to Blake Street, along with streets running northwest to Whitney Street. It was extended in 1990 to include properties further west on West Main Street (nearly to Chestnut Street), and again in 2006 to include properties south of West Main Street between South Street on the east and Charles and Ruggles Streets in the west, and abutting the Cedar Swamp Archeological District to the southeast. In 2009 it was extended a third time, to include a cluster of streets north of Milk Street and west of East Main Street.

== See also ==
- National Register of Historic Places listings in Worcester County, Massachusetts
