= Daniel Pitt =

Welsh boxer (born 2006)

Personal information
- Nationality: Welsh
- Born: Daniel Thomas Pitt; 8 February 2006 (age 20)

Sport
- Sport: Boxing
- Weight class: Cruiserweight
- Club: Brecon Phoenix ABC
Medal record
Men's amateur boxing
Representing Wales
World Boxing U19 Championships
Gold medal – first place	2024 Colorado	86kg

Daniel Pitt (born 8 February 2006) is a Welsh amateur boxer. He won the gold medal in the 86 kg division at the 2024 World Boxing Under-19 Championships, becoming his country's first male global amateur champion.

== Career ==
Having started boxing aged 13, Pitt was recruited onto the Welsh development squad at 16 and two years later was promoted to the national elite team.

A four-time Welsh champion and two-time Tri-Nations winner, he was selected to represent his country in the 86 kg category at the inaugural World Boxing Under-19 Championships held in Pueblo, Colorado, USA, in November 2024. After beating Aryan Aryan from India in the semi-finals, Pitt defeated Kazakhstan's Danial Raimbekov by unanimous decision in the final to claim the gold medal. In doing so he became Wales' first male world amateur champion, and only the second in total after Lauren Price who won middleweight gold at the 2019 Women's World Championships.

In September 2025, he was one of six international boxers elected onto the World Boxing Athlete Committee.

Pitt was selected to represent Wales at the 2026 Commonwealth Games in Glasgow, Scotland. Competing in the 80 kg division, he defeated Dee Ioapo of Samoa and Kua Gunua Mua from Papua New Guinea to make it through to the quarterfinals, where he lost 4:1 to Australia's Paul Trainor.

== Personal life ==
Away from the boxing ring, Pitt is a student at Cardiff Metropolitan University.
