= Tiah-Mai Ayton =

English boxer (born 2006)

Personal information
- Nickname: The Star Girl
- Nationality: English
- Born: 21 August 2006 (age 20)
- Weight: Featherweight, Lightweight, Bantamweight

Boxing career
- Stance: Orthodox

Boxing record
- Total fights: 7
- Wins: 7
- Win by KO: 6
Medal record
Women's amateur boxing
Representing England
World Boxing U19 Championships
Gold medal – first place	2024 Colorado	57kg

Tiah-Mai Ayton (born 21 August 2006) is an English professional boxer. She has held the Commonwealth female featherweight title since August 2026. As an amateur Ayton won the gold medal in the 57 kg category at the 2024 World Boxing Under-19 Championships.

== Career ==
A former kickboxing and Muay Thai age-group world champion, Ayton won all 21 of her amateur boxing bouts including claiming five national titles and the 2024 Haringey Box Cup.

She won the 57 kg category gold medal at the inaugural World Boxing Under-19 Championships held in Pueblo, Colorado, USA, in November 2024. At her first senior international competition she won the 60 kg division at the 2025 Golden Girl Championship Tournament in Sweden.

Rejecting a contract offer from Team GB to stay as an amateur, Ayton turned professional and signed a long-term promotional deal with Matchroom Boxing in May 2025, having impressed the organisation's chief, Eddie Hearn, while sparring with then WBC female featherweight champion Skye Nicolson.

She made her pro-debut at bp pulse LIVE Arena in Birmingham on 21 June 2025, knocking her opponent, Sara Orszagi, to the canvas twice before the fight was stopped in the third round.

Ayton made her second outing in the paid ranks against Lydie Bialic at Rainton Meadows Arena in Houghton-le-Spring on 6 September 2025. She won by stoppage in the fourth round.

Less than six weeks later, on 17 October 2025, she stopped Laura Belen Valdebenito in the fourth of their scheduled six-round bout at York Hall in London on 17 October 2025.

Next, Ayton faced Ana Karla Vaz De Moraes in her first eight-round bout at Indigo at the O2 in London on 17 December 2025. After sending her opponent to the canvas in the first round, she ended the fight in the third with a knockout.

Ayton faced Catherine Tacone Ramos over eight rounds at Nottingham Arena in Nottingham on 21 February 2026. She was taken the distance for the first time in her professional career, winning on points 77–75.

In her next outing, Ayton took on Stevi Levy at University of Wolverhampton at The Halls in Wolverhampton on 2 May 2026. She won by stoppage in the fourth round when he opponent's corner threw in the towel.

Ayton won her first professional title when Ellie Hellewell retired at the end of the sixth round of their fight for the vacant Commonwealth female featherweight championship at the Copper Box Arena in London on 22 August 2026.

== Professional boxing record ==
7 fights	7 wins	0 losses
By knockout	6	0
By decision	1	0

No.	Result	Record	Opponent	Type	Round, time	Date	Location	Notes
7	Win	7–0	Ellie Hellewell	RTD	6 (10), 2:00	22 Aug 2026	Copper Box Arena, London, England	Won vacant Commonwealth female featherweight title
6	Win	6–0	Stevi Levy	TKO	4 (8), 0:37	2 May 2026	University of Wolverhampton at The Halls, Wolverhampton, England	
5	Win	5–0	Catherine Tacone Ramos	PTS	8	21 Feb 2026	Nottingham Arena, Nottingham, England	
4	Win	4–0	Ana Karla Vaz De Moraes	TKO	3 (8), 1:26	17 Dec 2025	Indigo at The O2, London, England	
3	Win	3–0	Laura Belen Valdebenito	TKO	4 (6), 1:59	17 Oct 2025	York Hall, London, England	
2	Win	2–0	Lydie Bialic	TKO	4 (6), 0:48	6 Sep 2025	Rainton Meadows Arena, Houghton-le-Spring, England	
1	Win	1–0	Sara Orszagi	TKO	3 (6), 0:23	21 Jun 2025	bp pulse LIVE Arena, Birmingham, England	
