= Leo Atang =

English boxer (born 2007)

Personal information
- Nationality: English
- Born: Leo Fonawah Atang; 28 January 2007 (age 19) York, England
- Height: 6 ft 6 in (198 cm)
- Weight: Heavyweight

Boxing career
- Stance: Orthodox

Boxing record
- Total fights: 9
- Wins: 9
- Win by KO: 8
Medal record
Men's amateur boxing
Representing England
World Boxing U19 Championships
Gold medal – first place	2024 Colorado	+90kg
European Youth Boxing Championships
Gold medal – first place	2024 Poreč	92kg
European Junior Boxing Championships
Silver medal – second place	2023 Ploiesti	+80kg

Leo Atang (born 28 January 2007) is an English professional boxer. As an amateur he won the gold medal in the +90 kg category at the 2024 World Boxing Under-19 Championships.

== Career ==
A five-time national champion, Atang won the +90 kg division gold medal at the inaugural World Boxing Under-19 Championships held in Pueblo, Colorado, USA, in November 2024, defeating South Korea's Lee Geon-Hui in the final by first round stoppage.

He turned professional in April 2025, signing a long-term promotional contract with Eddie Hearn led Matchroom Boxing and managed by former flyweight world champion Sunny Edwards.

Atang made his pro-debut at Manchester Arena on 5 July 2025, stopping Milen Paunov in the first of their scheduled four-round contest.

He made his second outing in the paid ranks against Cristian Uwaka in another four-round bout at Rainton Meadows Arena in Houghton-le-Spring on 6 September 2025. In a repeat of his debut, Atang stopped his opponent in the first round.

Next, Atang faced the previously unbeaten Babu Yusuf at Legon Sports Stadium in Accra, Ghana, on 20 December 2025, once again winning via stoppage in the first round.

He returned to action against Amine Boucetta at Newcastle Arena on 31 January 2026 and for the first time in his professional career was taken beyond the opening round, winning by knockout in the third.

Atang fought Dan Garber at Nottingham Arena on 21 February 2026. He won by stoppage after 62 seconds of the first round.

In his next contest, Atang was taken the distance for the first time in his professional career, defeating Viktar Chvarkou on points over six rounds at Liverpool Arena on 18 April 2026.

He stopped Fouad Shaili in the first round at Sheffield Arena on 6 June 2026. Atang made his United States debut against Glen Williams at Dignity Health Sports Park in Carson, California, on 18 July 2026. He won by stoppage in the second round.

On 24 October 2026 at Sheffield Arena, Atang defeated Jonathan Exequiel Vergara via first round technical knockout, sending his opponent to the canvas three times before the bout was halted.

== Professional boxing record ==
9 fights	9 wins	0 losses
By knockout	8	0
By decision	1	0

No.	Result	Record	Opponent	Type	Round, time	Date	Location	Notes
9	Win	9–0	Jonathan Exequiel Vergara	TKO	1 (6), 3:00	24 Oct 2026	Sheffield Arena, Sheffield, England	
8	Win	8–0	Glen Williams	TKO	2 (6), 2:50	18 Jul 2026	Dignity Health Sports Park, Carson, California, U.S	
7	Win	7–0	Fouad Shaili	TKO	1 (6), 2:30	6 Jun 2026	Sheffield Arena, Sheffield, England	
6	Win	6–0	Viktar Chvarkou	PTS	6	18 Apr 2026	Liverpool Arena, Liverpool, England	
5	Win	5–0	Dan Garber	TKO	1 (6), 1:02	21 Feb 2026	Nottingham Arena, Nottingham, England	
4	Win	4–0	Amine Boucetta	KO	3 (4), 0:39	31 Jan 2026	Newcastle Arena, Newcastle upon Tyne, England	
3	Win	3–0	Babu Yusuf	TKO	1 (4), 1:24	20 Dec 2025	Legon Sports Stadium, Accra, Ghana	
2	Win	2–0	Cristian Uwaka	TKO	1 (4), 2:31	6 Sep 2025	Rainton Meadows Arena, Houghton-le-Spring, England	
1	Win	1–0	Milen Paunov	TKO	1 (4), 2:29	5 Jul 2025	Manchester Arena, Manchester, England	
