= 01582 =

01582 may refer to:

- Westborough, Massachusetts, US (ZIP code 01582)
- Luton, UK (dialling code 01582)
