= Joseph Lothrop House =

Historic house in Massachusetts, United States

- U.S. National Register of Historic Places
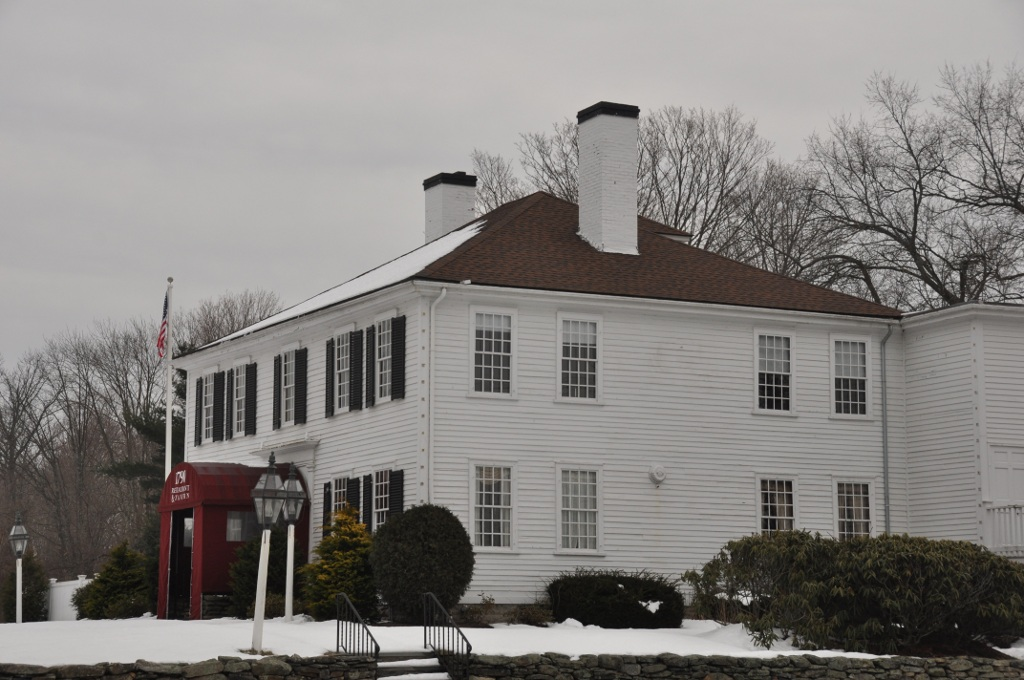

- Location within Massachusetts Location within the United States
- Nearest city: 208 Turnpike Road, Westborough, Massachusetts
- Coordinates: 42°17′1″N 71°37′34″W
- Built: 1825
- Architectural style: Federal
- NRHP reference No.: 80001680
- Added to NRHP: March 27, 1980

The Joseph Lothrop House is a historic house in Westborough, Massachusetts. It is listed on the National Register of Historic Places as being in the "Shrewsbury vicinity", but Massachusetts cultural inventory identifies its location in Westborough.

The Federal style house was built in 1825 and added to the National Register of Historic Places in 1980.

== History ==
The home was built by Joseph Lothrop, the brother-in-law of Nathan A. Fisher, whose house is across the turnpike. The home is located very close to the center of Wessonville, which was the center of town activity at the time. While built as a residential home, the property was renovated and became a restaurant (Bergson's).

In 2013 the home became the corporate headquarters for PENTA Communications, Inc.

Deborah Penta, CEO of PENTA Communications, Inc. was awarded with the Silver Hammer Award by the Worcester Regional Chamber for extraordinary renovation and historic preservation of the property.

== See also ==
- National Register of Historic Places listings in Worcester County, Massachusetts
