= Primrose Potter =

Australian philanthropist and arts administrator

Primrose Potter, Lady Potter AC (born 23 April 1931) is an Australian philanthropist and arts administrator. She is particularly associated with The Australian Ballet. She is the widow of Sir Ian Potter.

== Life ==
Primrose Catherine Anderson-Stuart was born in Sydney in 1931, the daughter of a radiologist, Bouverie Anderson-Stuart. Her grandfather was Sir Thomas Peter Anderson Stuart, who established the Medical School at the University of Sydney. She was educated at Ascham School.

Her first marriage, in 1952, was to a doctor, Roger Dunlop, with whom she had a daughter, Primrose Dunlop, known as "Pitty Pat" (1954 - 2025). After their divorce in 1969, she married businessman and stockbroker Sir Ian Potter in 1975, becoming Lady Potter. They had met at a dinner hosted by William and Sonia McMahon. Sir Ian Potter had children from three earlier marriages.

Primrose Potter has been: director and Victorian chairman of the Australian Elizabethan Theatre Trust 1989 to 1991; director of the Bell Shakespeare company 1990 to 1991; trustee of American Friends of the National Gallery of Australia since 1989; national president of the Australian Ballet Special Events Committee 1993; member of the Howard Florey Institute; member of the Walter and Eliza Hall Institute of Medical Research; director of the Ian Potter Museum of Art from 1999; and life governor of the Ian Potter Foundation. She was founding honorary patron of the Melba Foundation, founding patron of the Victorian Opera company, and patron of the Australian Centre for Contemporary Art. She is currently patron-in-chief of the Solomon Foundation, a charity that supports various social development projects in the Solomon Islands.

She has also raised funds for The Smith Family, the Society of Saint Vincent de Paul, and the Victorian AIDS Council (VAC).

== Honours ==
In the 1988 Queen's Birthday Honours, Lady Potter was appointed an Officer of the Order of Australia (AO) for service to the arts and the community. In 2003 she was promoted to Companion of the Order (AC) for leadership and for encouragement of support for critical community growth through fundraising and philanthropy in the arts, sciences, education and social welfare.

In February 2010, The Australian Ballet named its headquarters in Southbank, Melbourne, the Primrose Potter Australian Ballet Centre, to honour her 35 years of service to the organisation.

She has been awarded honorary doctorates from Australian Catholic University, and Monash University. She is a member of the Order of Saint Lazarus of Jerusalem, and in 2003 she was appointed a commendatore of the Order of Merit of the Italian Republic, for her work promoting Italian culture in Australia.
