= Alice Pumphrey =

English boxer (born 2006)

Personal information
- Born: 2 May 2006 (age 20)

Sport
- Sport: Boxing
- Weight class: Light-flyweight, Flyweight
- Club: The Purge Boxing Academy
Medal record
Women's amateur boxing
Representing England
World Boxing U19 Championships
Gold medal – first place	2024 Colorado	51 kg
European Youth Boxing Championships
Gold medal – first place	2024 Poreč	50 kg
European Junior Boxing Championships
Gold medal – first place	2022 Montesilvano	50 kg
European Schools Boxing Championships
Gold medal – first place	2019 Tbilisi	48 kg

Alice Pumphrey (born 2 May 2006) is an English amateur boxer. She won the gold medal in the 51 kg category at the 2024 World Boxing Under-19 Championships. Pumphrey is also the first English female boxer to win gold at the European Schools, Junior and Youth Championships.

== Career ==
A talented footballer, Pumphrey signed an academy contract with Manchester United at the age of 11, before switching to boxing.

She won the gold medal in the 48 kg division at the 2019 European Schools Boxing Championships in Tbilisi, Georgia, and repeated the feat at the 2022 European Junior Boxing Championships in Montesilvano, Italy, this time in the 50 kg category.

Pumphrey completed a hat-trick of continental titles by winning the 50 kg gold at the 2024 European Youth Championships in Poreč, Croatia. In doing so she became the first English female boxer to win gold at the European Schools, Junior and Youth Championships.

Moving onto the global stage, she won the 51 kg division gold medal at the inaugural World Boxing Under-19 Championships held in Pueblo, Colorado, USA, in November 2024.

Pumphrey made her senior international debut at the Boxam tournament in La Nucia, Spain, in February 2025, defeating the home nation's Laura Barcelo in the light-flyweight semi-finals and then Ukraine's Yaroslava Marynchuk in the final to take the title.

She was selected to represent England in the 48 kg category at the World Boxing Championships in Liverpool in September 2025. In her opening bout, Pumphrey beat Bulgarian boxer Sevda Asenova via unanimous decision. She then lost by unanimous decision to India's Meenakshi Hooda in the quarter-finals.
