= 2026 World Boxing U19 Championships =

- Venue: Mediterranean Sports Center
- Location: Budva, Montenegro
- Dates: 16–27 October
- Competitors: 474 from 67 nations

2026 World Boxing U19 Championships were held from 16 to 27 October 2026 in Budva, Montenegro. Hosted by World Boxing for boxers under 19 years old, it was the second edition of the World Boxing U19 Championships. There were ten weight categories with sections for men and women.

== Schedule ==
All times are local (UTC+2 from 16 to 24 October, UTC+1 from 25 to 27 October).

Date Event	Fri 16	Sat 17		Sun 18		Mon 19		Tue 20		Wed 21		Thu 22		Fri 23		Sat 24		Sun 25		Mon 26	Tue 27	
Date Event	18:00	14:00	18:00	14:00	18:00	14:00	18:00	14:00	18:00	14:00	18:00	14:00	18:00	14:00	18:00	14:00	18:00	14:00	18:00		14:00	18:00
Men's 50 kg				R32				R16							QF			SF				F
Men's 55 kg	R64				R32							R16				QF			SF		F	
Men's 60 kg		R64					R32						R16			QF		SF			F	
Men's 65 kg			R64					R32				R16			QF				SF			F
Men's 70 kg		R64				R32						R16				QF		SF			F	
Men's 75 kg							R32				R16						QF		SF		F	
Men's 80 kg			R64						R32				R16				QF		SF			F
Men's 85 kg					R32						R16				QF			SF				F
Men's 90 kg		R32								R16					QF				SF		F	
Men's +90 kg	R16														QF				SF			F
Women's 48 kg				R32										R16			QF		SF		F	
Women's 51 kg									R32				R16				QF		SF			F
Women's 54 kg		R32				R16								QF				SF			F	
Women's 57 kg				R32										R16			QF		SF			F
Women's 60 kg	R32										R16					QF		SF			F	
Women's 65 kg			R32							R16							QF		SF			F
Women's 70 kg										R16					QF			SF			F	
Women's 75 kg													R16			QF		SF				F
Women's 80 kg														QF				SF			F	
Women's +80 kg									QF									SF				F

== Medal table ==
Rank	Nation	Gold	Silver	Bronze	Total
1	Russia	5	5	0	10
2	Uzbekistan	4	2	2	8
3	United States	2	1	2	5
4	Kazakhstan	1	3	4	8
5	China	1	3	1	5
6	Ireland	1	1	4	6
7	India	1	1	2	4
7	Ukraine	1	1	2	4
9	England	1	0	3	4
10	Brazil	1	0	2	3
11	Argentina	1	0	0	1
11	Scotland	1	0	0	1
13	Iran	0	1	0	1
13	Japan	0	1	0	1
13	Spain	0	1	0	1
16	Algeria	0	0	3	3
16	Italy	0	0	3	3
18	Azerbaijan	0	0	2	2
19	Armenia	0	0	1	1
19	Canada	0	0	1	1
19	Cuba	0	0	1	1
19	Georgia	0	0	1	1
19	Germany	0	0	1	1
19	Greece	0	0	1	1
19	Hungary	0	0	1	1
19	Kyrgyzstan	0	0	1	1
19	Turkey	0	0	1	1
19	Venezuela	0	0	1	1
Totals (28 entries)		20	20	40	80

== Medal summary ==
=== Men ===
Event	Gold	Silver	Bronze
50 kg	Aaron Sarwar; Scotland	Vladimir Orlov; Russia	Riadh Belhaidouche; Algeria
50 kg	Aaron Sarwar; Scotland	Vladimir Orlov; Russia	Shalva Beridze; Georgia
55 kg	Aditya; India	Islam Magomedov; Russia	Nihat Gasimov; Azerbaijan
55 kg	Aditya; India	Islam Magomedov; Russia	Gustavo Silva; Brazil
60 kg	Nicolás Peralta; Argentina	Kalib Walshe; Ireland	Daniyar Akbissenov; Kazakhstan
60 kg	Nicolás Peralta; Argentina	Kalib Walshe; Ireland	Nearchos Konstantinoudis; Greece
65 kg	Yashua Flemming; England	Pablo Souto; Spain	Asaan Jenkins; United States
65 kg	Yashua Flemming; England	Pablo Souto; Spain	Jason Donoghue; Ireland
70 kg	John Donohue; Ireland	Bibarys Ashirbay; Kazakhstan	Artyom Stepanyan; Armenia
70 kg	John Donohue; Ireland	Bibarys Ashirbay; Kazakhstan	Zulfikor Adkhamjonov; Uzbekistan
75 kg	Suhrob Rakhmatullaev; Uzbekistan	Mohammad Saleh Mesbahi; Iran	Jason Whelan; Ireland
75 kg	Suhrob Rakhmatullaev; Uzbekistan	Mohammad Saleh Mesbahi; Iran	Kobe Clarke; England
80 kg	Prokhor Startsev; Russia	Yeerasili Ashan; China	Dietrich Hermann; Germany
80 kg	Prokhor Startsev; Russia	Yeerasili Ashan; China	Tiberio Nocadello; Italy
85 kg	Kirill Korshakov; Russia	Sardorbek Bakhromkhujaev; Uzbekistan	Gyula Bozai; Hungary
85 kg	Kirill Korshakov; Russia	Sardorbek Bakhromkhujaev; Uzbekistan	Julio Chivás; Cuba
90 kg	Asadbek Sultanboev; Uzbekistan	Vladyslav Naumenko; Ukraine	Albe Dowell; England
90 kg	Asadbek Sultanboev; Uzbekistan	Vladyslav Naumenko; Ukraine	Yerketang Zharkynbek; Kazakhstan
+90 kg	Islam Salikhov; Uzbekistan	Vladislav Samozhonov; Kazakhstan	Volodymyr Derkach; Ukraine
+90 kg	Islam Salikhov; Uzbekistan	Vladislav Samozhonov; Kazakhstan	Safdar Mammadzada; Azerbaijan

=== Women ===
Event	Gold	Silver	Bronze
48 kg	Elissandra Santos; Brazil	Hiyori Miki; Japan	Ellen Joyce; Ireland
48 kg	Elissandra Santos; Brazil	Hiyori Miki; Japan	Mukhtasar Alieva; Uzbekistan
51 kg	Nazokat Mardonova; Uzbekistan	Ruby Lopez; United States	Madira Zhumakan; Kazakhstan
51 kg	Nazokat Mardonova; Uzbekistan	Ruby Lopez; United States	Grenyelis García; Venezuela
54 kg	Kira Makohonenko; Ukraine	Yang Sirui; China	Kesia Reale; Italy
54 kg	Kira Makohonenko; Ukraine	Yang Sirui; China	Guadalupe Ruiz; United States
57 kg	Anastasiia Golunova; Russia	Alina Kudaigenova; Kazakhstan	Besma Bahri; Algeria
57 kg	Anastasiia Golunova; Russia	Alina Kudaigenova; Kazakhstan	Zheng Yaruo; China
60 kg	Wang Shasha; China	Ekaterina Nesvetaeva; Russia	Indira Kydyrmoldayeva; Kazakhstan
60 kg	Wang Shasha; China	Ekaterina Nesvetaeva; Russia	Lexie Walker; England
65 kg	Lauryn Elmore; United States	Bella Zueva; Russia	Harsika; India
65 kg	Lauryn Elmore; United States	Bella Zueva; Russia	Amelia Zamana; Italy
70 kg	Marley McNealy; United States	Maftuna Yangieva; Uzbekistan	Kaysie Joyce; Ireland
70 kg	Marley McNealy; United States	Maftuna Yangieva; Uzbekistan	Hanane Daouadji; Algeria
75 kg	Daria Antipova; Russia	Gong Shengjie; China	Stephani Amaral; Brazil
75 kg	Daria Antipova; Russia	Gong Shengjie; China	Emilie Derasp; Canada
80 kg	Ekaterina Frolova; Russia	Megha Sheokand; India	Sofiia Novikova; Ukraine
80 kg	Ekaterina Frolova; Russia	Megha Sheokand; India	Meerim Chynybekova; Kyrgyzstan
+80 kg	Zarina Tolybay; Kazakhstan	Samira Itonieva; Russia	Miray Doğru; Turkey
+80 kg	Zarina Tolybay; Kazakhstan	Samira Itonieva; Russia	Prachi Tokas; India

== Participating nations ==
Nation	Men										Women										Total
Nation	50 kg	55 kg	60 kg	65 kg	70 kg	75 kg	80 kg	85 kg	90 kg	+90 kg	48 kg	51 kg	54 kg	57 kg	60 kg	65 kg	70 kg	75 kg	80 kg	+80 kg	Total
Albania			Yes			Yes															2
Algeria	Yes	Yes	Yes	Yes	Yes	Yes	Yes	Yes	Yes		Yes	Yes		Yes	Yes		Yes				14
Argentina			Yes		Yes																2
Armenia		Yes	Yes	Yes	Yes	Yes	Yes	Yes	Yes		Yes										9
Australia	Yes	Yes	Yes	Yes	Yes	Yes	Yes	Yes			Yes			Yes		Yes					11
Austria				Yes																	1
Azerbaijan	Yes	Yes	Yes	Yes	Yes		Yes			Yes	Yes	Yes									9
Belarus	Yes		Yes	Yes	Yes	Yes		Yes	Yes	Yes	Yes										9
Belgium	Yes															Yes					2
Bosnia and Herzegovina				Yes		Yes			Yes												3
Brazil		Yes	Yes	Yes			Yes				Yes			Yes	Yes			Yes			8
Bulgaria				Yes	Yes	Yes		Yes			Yes		Yes								6
Canada		Yes	Yes	Yes	Yes	Yes	Yes							Yes	Yes	Yes		Yes			10
China		Yes		Yes	Yes		Yes					Yes	Yes	Yes	Yes	Yes	Yes	Yes			11
Chinese Taipei												Yes				Yes					2
Colombia	Yes																				1
Croatia			Yes	Yes	Yes		Yes	Yes		Yes	Yes					Yes	Yes				9
Cuba		Yes						Yes					Yes		Yes						4
Czech Republic		Yes		Yes																	2
England	Yes	Yes		Yes		Yes		Yes	Yes			Yes		Yes	Yes	Yes	Yes	Yes			12
Estonia			Yes	Yes			Yes														3
France		Yes				Yes	Yes								Yes						4
Georgia	Yes		Yes	Yes	Yes		Yes	Yes													6
Germany					Yes	Yes	Yes		Yes	Yes	Yes			Yes	Yes						8
Greece	Yes	Yes	Yes			Yes		Yes	Yes		Yes		Yes	Yes							9
Hong Kong	Yes	Yes	Yes		Yes																4
Hungary	Yes	Yes			Yes			Yes				Yes									5
Iceland	Yes				Yes																2
India	Yes	Yes	Yes	Yes	Yes		Yes	Yes	Yes	Yes	Yes		Yes	Yes	Yes	Yes	Yes	Yes	Yes	Yes	18
Iran	Yes		Yes	Yes		Yes	Yes														5
Ireland	Yes	Yes	Yes	Yes	Yes	Yes					Yes	Yes	Yes			Yes	Yes	Yes			12
Israel	Yes	Yes	Yes	Yes	Yes	Yes	Yes						Yes		Yes						9
Italy		Yes	Yes	Yes	Yes	Yes	Yes	Yes	Yes			Yes	Yes		Yes	Yes	Yes				13
Japan	Yes	Yes									Yes	Yes									4
Kazakhstan	Yes	Yes	Yes	Yes	Yes	Yes	Yes	Yes	Yes	Yes	Yes	Yes	Yes	Yes	Yes	Yes	Yes	Yes	Yes	Yes	20
Kosovo		Yes								Yes											2
Kyrgyzstan		Yes	Yes	Yes	Yes		Yes	Yes	Yes					Yes	Yes		Yes		Yes		11
Latvia				Yes	Yes	Yes			Yes	Yes		Yes									6
Lebanon			Yes					Yes		Yes											3
Lithuania		Yes	Yes	Yes		Yes	Yes		Yes				Yes		Yes	Yes					9
Mexico	Yes	Yes	Yes	Yes		Yes			Yes	Yes	Yes	Yes									9
Moldova	Yes	Yes	Yes	Yes	Yes		Yes		Yes												7
Montenegro				Yes				Yes													2
Netherlands							Yes									Yes					2
New Zealand		Yes			Yes								Yes		Yes						4
Panama									Yes			Yes									2
Poland		Yes	Yes	Yes	Yes		Yes	Yes	Yes		Yes	Yes	Yes	Yes	Yes	Yes	Yes				14
Portugal				Yes	Yes		Yes														3
Puerto Rico				Yes																	1
Romania	Yes	Yes	Yes	Yes	Yes					Yes											6
Russia	Yes	Yes	Yes	Yes	Yes	Yes	Yes	Yes	Yes	Yes	Yes	Yes	Yes	Yes	Yes	Yes	Yes	Yes	Yes	Yes	20
Samoa																				Yes	1
Scotland	Yes	Yes	Yes										Yes								4
Serbia	Yes	Yes	Yes	Yes	Yes	Yes	Yes		Yes			Yes		Yes		Yes		Yes			12
Slovakia	Yes	Yes	Yes	Yes		Yes	Yes					Yes			Yes	Yes					9
Slovenia			Yes	Yes		Yes															3
Spain		Yes	Yes	Yes	Yes		Yes	Yes				Yes		Yes							8
Sweden				Yes					Yes				Yes				Yes				4
Tajikistan				Yes			Yes							Yes							3
Tunisia														Yes							1
Turkey			Yes	Yes	Yes		Yes			Yes	Yes	Yes	Yes			Yes	Yes	Yes	Yes	Yes	13
Turkmenistan	Yes	Yes	Yes	Yes	Yes	Yes															6
Tuvalu																				Yes	1
Ukraine	Yes	Yes	Yes	Yes	Yes	Yes	Yes	Yes	Yes	Yes	Yes	Yes	Yes	Yes	Yes	Yes	Yes	Yes	Yes		19
United States	Yes	Yes	Yes	Yes	Yes	Yes	Yes			Yes	Yes	Yes	Yes	Yes		Yes	Yes	Yes			15
Uzbekistan	Yes	Yes	Yes	Yes	Yes	Yes	Yes	Yes	Yes	Yes	Yes	Yes	Yes	Yes	Yes	Yes	Yes	Yes			18
Venezuela				Yes			Yes		Yes			Yes	Yes		Yes	Yes					7
Total (67 entries)	29	37	38	45	35	28	33	22	23	16	21	23	20	20	21	22	16	13	6	6	474
