= Lonsdale (surname) =

- Pronunciation: English: /ˈlɒnzdeɪl/
- Language: English

Origin
- Language: English
- Meaning: valley of the (River) Lune
- Region of origin: England

Other names
- Variant forms: Landsdale, Langsdale, Lansdell, Londsdale

Lonsdale is an English surname which has its origins in the description of the valley of the River Lune in Cumbria and Lancashire. Notable people with the surname include:

- Chris Lonsdale (politician) (born 1996), American state legislator
- Angela Lonsdale (born 1970), English actress
- Anne Lonsdale (born 1941), British sinologist, third President of New Hall, University of Cambridge
- Bruce Lonsdale (1949–1982), Canadian politician
- Charles Lonsdale (born 1965), British diplomat
- Chris Lonsdale (born 1987), Bermudian former cricketer and footballer
- Christopher Lonsdale (1886–1952), Canadian founder and first headmaster of Shawnigan Lake School, British Columbia
- David Lonsdale (born 1963), English actor
- Derrick Lonsdale (1924–2024), British-born American pediatrician and researcher
- Edmund Lonsdale (1843–1913), Australian politician
- Ella Lonsdale (born 2007), English boxer
- Frederick Lonsdale (1881–1954), English dramatist
- Gordon Lonsdale, alias of Konon Molody (1922–1970), Soviet spy
- Harry Lonsdale (1932–2014), American scientist, businessman, and politician
- Horatio Walter Lonsdale (1844–1919), English painter and designer
- James Lonsdale (painter) (1777–1839), English portraitist
- James Lonsdale (Irish politician) (1865–1921), Northern Irish politician
- Joe Lonsdale (born 1982/1983), American entrepreneur and venture capitalist
- John Lonsdale (1788–1867), Principal of King's College, London, later Bishop of Lichfield
- John Lonsdale, 1st Baron Armaghdale (1850–1924), Northern Irish businessman and politician
- Dame Kathleen Lonsdale (1903–1971), Irish-born British crystallographer
- Keiynan Lonsdale (born 1991), Australian actor
- Michael Lonsdale (1931–2020), French actor
- Neil Lonsdale (1907–1989), New Zealand editorial cartoonist
- Richard Lonsdale (1913–1988), British Army officer in the Parachute Regiment in World War II
- Roger Lonsdale, British author and academic
- Rupert Lonsdale (1905–1999), British submarine commander, prisoner of war and Anglican clergyman
- Shawn Lonsdale (1969–2008), American videographer and critic of the Church of Scientology
- Tommy Lonsdale (1882–1973), English footballer
- William Lonsdale (1794–1871), English geologist and palaeontologist
- William Lonsdale (colonist) (1799–1864), supervised the founding of Port Phillip, later named Melbourne, Australia
- Willie Lonsdale (born 1986), New Zealand cricketer
