= Cedar Swamp Archeological District =

Historic district in Massachusetts, United States

- U.S. National Register of Historic Places
- U.S. Historic district
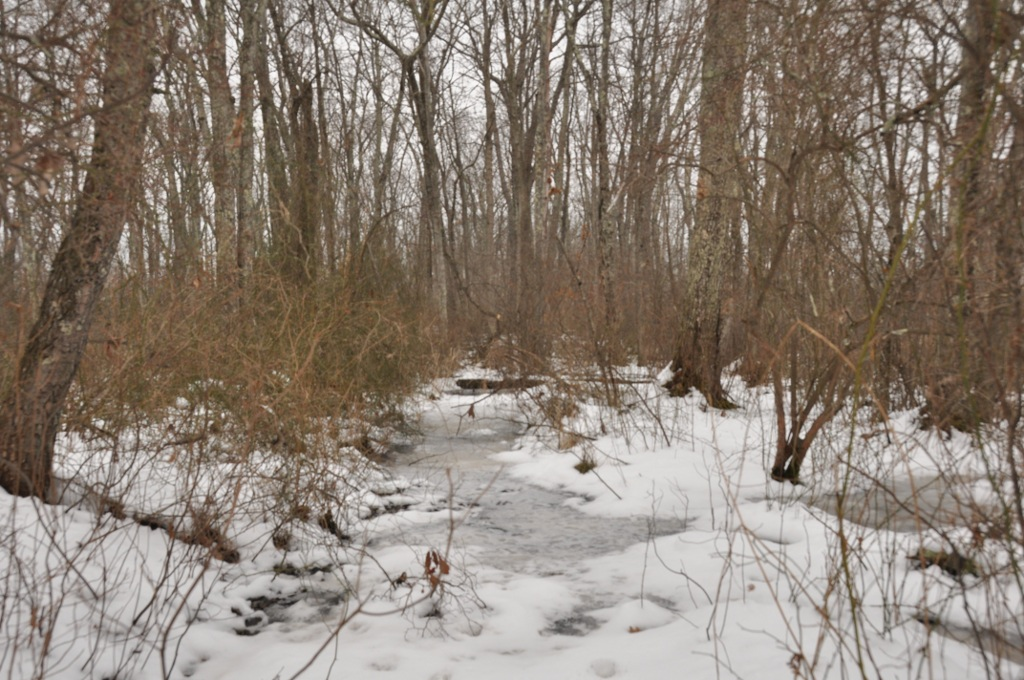
- Location: Westborough and Hopkinton, Massachusetts
- Area: 2,675 acres (1,083 ha)
- NRHP reference No.: 88000587
- Added to NRHP: May 23, 1988

Cedar Swamp Archeological District is a prehistoric and historic archaeologically sensitive area in eastern Westborough, Massachusetts, and extending into the northwest corner of Hopkinton. Cedar Swamp is an area of more than 2,600 acres (1,100 ha) of wetlands that include the headwaters area of the Sudbury River. Archeological surveys of the environmentally sensitive and critical area have identified many Native American sites of interest. It is believed that Native Americans prized wood from the cedar trees that grew in the area. The archeological district, which encompasses much of the Cedar Swamp area, was added to the National Register of Historic Places in 1988.

== Description ==
The Cedar Swamp Archeological District is located east of the center of Westborough, encompassing a large swampy area, bounded on the east and west by roadways, and the north and south by lines drawn across the terrain at a mean altitude of 300 ft (91 m) above sea level. Parts of this area are traversed by highways (including Interstates 90 and 495), as well as secondary roads.

One archaeological site of note is located on an island in the swamp, which was discovered in 1974 and excavated in 1984-86. Features of this site include a large refuse midden and a hearth, the latter of which has been radiocarbon dated to about 200 BCE. Neville and Stark projectile points were also found at this site. A second site of interest is based around a stone outcrop on the northern edge of the swamp. This site has extensive evidence of stone tool making, using materials gathered from the outcrop.

The swamp was first examined by amateur archaeologists in 1939, with the first substantive collections of artifacts gathered in the 1960s. Local and state efforts to investigate sites of interest in the swamp gained traction in the 1970s and 1980s, culminating in the area's National Register designation in 1988. Finds at sites in the swamp range in age from the Archaic Period to the Late Woodland.

== See also ==
- National Register of Historic Places listings in Worcester County, Massachusetts
- National Register of Historic Places listings in Middlesex County, Massachusetts
