= Lonsdale Sports Arena =

Former race track in the U.S. state of Rhode Island

- Location: Mendon Road, Cumberland, Rhode Island
- Coordinates: 41°54′46″N 71°24′23″W
- Opened: 1947 (79 years ago)
- Closed: 1956 (70 years ago)

Oval
- Surface: Asphalt
- Length: 0.34 mi (0.54 km)

Lonsdale Sports Arena was a one-third mile (0.54 km) high-banked paved oval race track located 2 miles (3.2 km) north of Pawtucket, Rhode Island, on Mendon Road (Rhode Island Route 122) in Cumberland, Rhode Island, on the banks of the Blackstone River. The track operated from 1947 to 1956. Its name was a reference to the Lonsdale historic district in the towns of Cumberland and Lincoln. A Stop & Shop plaza now occupies where the arena was.

== History ==
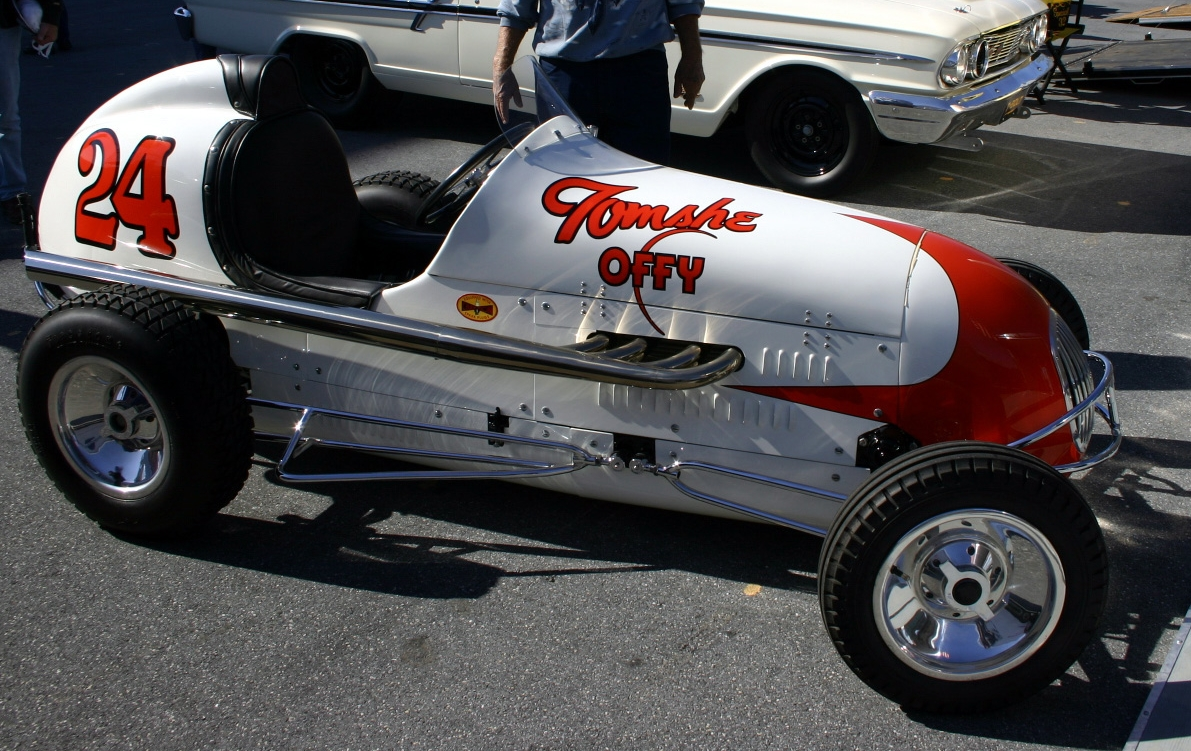
An Offenhauser-powered midget car

The site of Lonsdale Sports Arena was originally an earthen levee holding pond, used to retain water to power a local textile mill. The levee area was bought in 1934 by Edward A. McNulty, a local road builder, who first used it as a sand and gravel pit. McNulty later constructed a race track on the site.

Built for midget car racing, the asphalt race track hosted the quick open-wheeled machines during its inaugural season, 1947, as midget racing was king with Bill Schindler and his #2 car winning a season-high four features. Other winners that year were Lloyd Christopher, Joe Sostillio and Ted Tappet. Running mostly on Wednesday nights, the midgets also ran twice on Sundays and once on Fridays in 1947.

The season finale for Lonsdale in 1947 marked an important milestone in the history of motorsports. The MOA (Motor Racing Association) sanctioning body organized the inaugural stock car race in the Northern United States on October 26. Fonty Flock emerged victorious after completing 30 laps. The MOA eventually paved the way for the establishment of NASCAR, a renowned and influential racing brand. This event at Lonsdale served as a testing ground for stock car entrepreneurs like Bill France Sr., who sought to determine the long-term viability of stock car racing. Their vision and dedication have since propelled NASCAR to become one of the leading forms of auto racing in the United States, and even the world.

A showcase for midget racing, Lonsdale's role in the post-war midget boom came to an end. The debate over Offenhauser (Offy) and non-Offy powerplants was a part of the escalating costs of fielding a midget racer and contributed to a divide within the ranks. The stock car experiment at Lonsdale proved to be a cheaper form of racing. Stock cars replaced midgets at Lonsdale in the late 1940s or early 1950s. The stock cars (also called Jalopies or Modifieds) were well received by the track operators.

=== Incidents ===
On October 12, 1949, a driver from Harris, Rhode Island, was killed in a rollover accident during a race at the track.

== Closure ==
Lonsdale met its ultimate demise because of the Blackstone River. Its location on the banks of the river proved problematic when the river crested, flooded the track, and undermined the grandstands. The subsequent dwindling crowds did not allow the owner to rebuild the grandstands. The track's last race saw the same racing that started Lonsdale end its tenure on the racing circuit: an ARDC–USAC midget feature held on September 30, 1956. Cliff Riggot won the final race at Lonsdale in his Wozniak Offy. The final season champion at Lonsdale was the venerable Fred Luchesi, who also won championships at Seekonk Speedway, Norwood Arena Speedway, Waterford Speedbowl, and Westboro Speedway during this rough-and-tumble era.

New Jersey's Wall Township Speedway, which opened in 1950, was patterned after Lonsdale.

== Sources ==
- Pronyne Motorsports Museum
- Brown, Allan (2017). The History of America's Speedways: Past and Present. ISBN 978-0692835562.
