= 2024 World Boxing U19 Championships =

U19 world boxing tournament

- Venue: Pueblo Convention Center
- Location: Pueblo, Colorado, United States
- Dates: 26 October – 2 November 2024
- Competitors: 180+ from 30 nations

2024 World Boxing U19 Championships were held from 26 October to 2 November 2024 in Pueblo, Colorado, United States. Hosted by World Boxing for boxers under 19 years old, it was the first edition of the U19 World Boxing Championships. There were ten weight categories with sections for men and women. England and India topped the table with 9 and 17 medals each.

== Medal table ==
* Host nation (United States)

Rank	Nation	Gold	Silver	Bronze	Total
1	England	8	0	1	9
2	India	4	8	5	17
3	United States*	3	2	3	8
4	Japan	2	0	1	3
5	Australia	1	0	6	7
6	Wales	1	0	2	3
7	Czech Republic	1	0	1	2
8	Germany	0	3	2	5
9	Kazakhstan	0	2	0	2
10	South Korea	0	1	2	3
11	Brazil	0	1	1	2
12	Latvia	0	1	0	1
12	Netherlands	0	1	0	1
12	Thailand	0	1	0	1
15	New Zealand	0	0	3	3
15	Ukraine	0	0	3	3
17	Canada	0	0	2	2
17	Italy	0	0	2	2
19	Algeria	0	0	1	1
Totals (19 entries)		20	20	35	75

== Medal summary ==
=== Men ===
Event	Gold	Silver	Bronze
Light flyweight (50 kg)	Lorenzo Patricio; United States	Mohamed Al Manouchi; Germany	Rishi Singh; India John-Thomas Varey; England
Bantamweight (55 kg)	Fuma Kumamoto; Japan	Emmanuel Chance; United States	Krrish Pal; India Michael O'Sullivan; Wales
Lightweight (60 kg)	Yuga Fujiki; Japan	Aphichit Chaemdi; Thailand	Vidadi Zeiniiev; Ukraine Jacob Cassar; Australia
Light welterweight (65 kg)	Cooper Mcconnell; Australia	Assylkhan Kosherbai; Kazakhstan	Maksym Nizhenskyi; Ukraine Milwyn Lloyd; Wales
Light middleweight (70 kg)	John-Joe Carrigan; England	Gabriel Dias Dos Santos; Brazil	Sumit Sumit; India Diyanshu Redhu; Australia
Middleweight (75 kg)	Joseph Awinongya; United States	Rahul Kundu; India	Linkyn Macmillan; Australia Mustapha Abdou; Algeria
Light heavyweight (80 kg)	Elijah Lugo; United States	Ņikita Prohovskis; Latvia	Adam Kana; Czech Republic Sofian Bizzit; Germany
Cruiserweight (85 kg)	Daniel Pitt; Wales	Danial Raimbekov; Kazakhstan	Shin Min-seung; South Korea Aryan Aryan; India
Heavyweight (90 kg)	Hemant Sangwan; India	Rishon Sims; United States	Park San-gin; South Korea Noveki Tomokino; New Zealand
Super heavyweight (+90 kg)	Leo Atang; England	Lee Geon-hui; South Korea	Lakshay Rathi; India Vincenzo Guida; Italy

=== Women ===
Event	Gold	Silver	Bronze
Minimumweight (48 kg)	Ruby White; England	Chanchal Chaudhary; India	Zoe Courchesne; Canada Leah Anderton; Australia
Flyweight (51 kg)	Alice Pumphrey; England	Nisha Nisha; India	Laila Zakirova; United States Assia El Fachtali; Germany
Bantamweight (54 kg)	Caitlyn Wise; England	Supriya Devi Thokchom; India	Leticia Eleuterio De Brito; Brazil Bozhena Melnyk; Ukraine
Featherweight (57 kg)	Tiah-Mai Ayton; England	Anjali Kumari Singh; India	Sakura Okayama; Japan Geer Hall; New Zealand
Lightweight (60 kg)	Ella Lonsdale; England	Vini Vini; India	Shamiracle Hardaway; United States Ciara Storch; Australia
Welterweight (65 kg)	Parthavi Grewal; India	Aaliyah Hoppema; Netherlands	Indianna Timms; Australia Nevaeh Williams; United States
Light middleweight (70 kg)	Lilly Deacon; England	Akansha Phalaswal; India	Giulia Molinaro; Italy
Middleweight (75 kg)	Krisha Verma; India	Lerika Simon; Germany	Jarelyn Castillo; Canada Nikah Perez; New Zealand
Light heavyweight (80 kg)	Stella Blazkova; Czech Republic	Kritika Wasan; India	Not awarded
Heavyweight (+80 kg)	Vanshika Goswami; India	Victoria Gatt; Germany	Not awarded

== Participating nations ==
180+ boxers from 30 nations competed in the first edition of the championships.

- Algeria
- Australia
- Brazil
- Canada
- Czech Republic
- Ecuador
- England
- Finland
- Germany
- India
- Iraq
- Italy
- Japan
- Kazakhstan
- Kyrgyzstan
- Latvia
- Mongolia
- Netherlands
- New Zealand
- Nigeria
- Philippines
- Singapore
- South Korea
- Sweden
- Switzerland
- Tahiti
- Thailand
- Ukraine
- United States
- Wales
