= Hocomonco Pond =

Pond in Massachusetts, United States

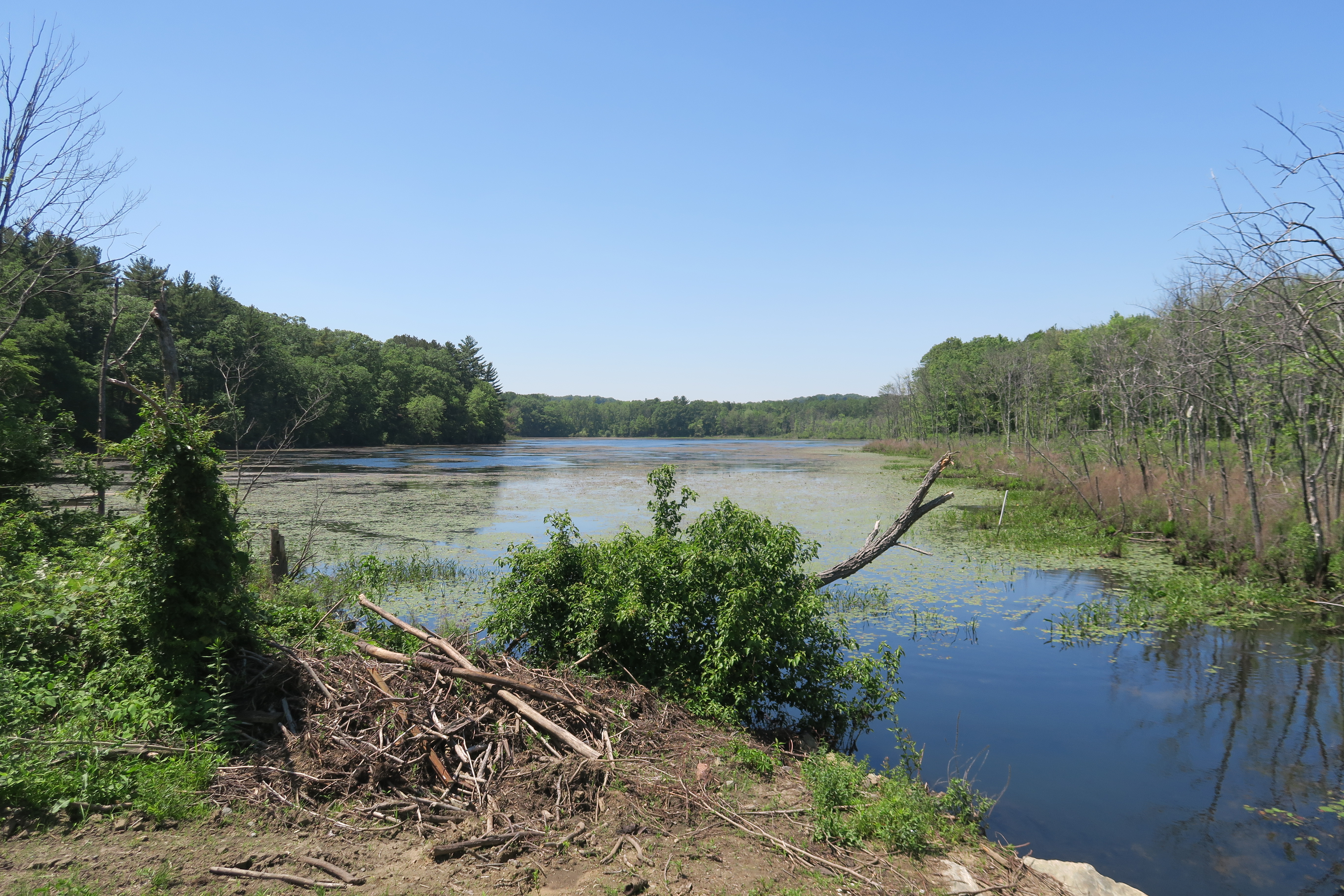
- Hocomonco Pond

- Location within Massachusetts Location within the United States
- Location: Westborough, Massachusetts
- Coordinates: 42°16′21″N 71°38′58″W
- Type: Pond
- Basin countries: United States
- Surface area: 27 acres (11 ha)
- Surface elevation: 276 ft (84 m)
- Superfund site

Information
- CERCLIS ID: MAD980732341
- Contaminants: Creosote

Progress
- Proposed: December 30, 1982
- Listed: September 8, 1983
- Construction completed: September 22, 1999

Hocomonco Pond is a recreational pond located in Westborough, Massachusetts near Route 9. Also called Hobomoc Pond, it was named for Hobomok, a Wamesit Indian evil spirit. The pond and adjacent land are a Superfund site.

== Superfund site ==
A wood treatment and preservation plant operated on a 23-acre (9.3 ha) site near the pond during the 1930s and 1940s. The business saturated wood products (e.g. telephone poles, railroad ties, pilings and fence posts) with creosote to preserve them. During the treatment process, excess creosote and wastes where discharged to an unlined pit, the "former lagoon". The creosote, which contains carcinogenic polyaromatic hydrocarbon (PAH) compounds, seeped into sediments, soil and groundwater. A storm drain built in the 1970s along the east side of the former lagoon transported liquid contaminants to the pond. The site was added to the National Priorities List on September 8, 1983.

A 1985 Record of Decision specified remedies for cleaning up the site. A landfill for the contaminants was constructed at the former lagoon. The storm drain was relocated. Contaminated soil, waste and sediments were excavated and dredged in operations completed in 1996. The former lagoon area was then capped. The groundwater remains contaminated.

== EPA Documents & Data ==
=== Hocomonco Pond, Westborough MA Site Documents & Data ===
epa.gov
