= Joe Sostilio =

American racing driver (1915–2000)

- Born: Joseph Sostilio; January 3, 1915 Newton Centre, Massachusetts, U.S.
- Died: July 9, 2000 (aged 85) New Port Richey, Florida, U.S.

Champ Car career
- 3 races run over 6 years
- Years active: 1950–1951, 1953–1955, 1963
- Best finish: 30th – 1954
- First race: 1954 Rex Mays Classic (Milwaukee)
- Last race: 1954 Independence Day Sweepstakes (Darlington)
Wins	Podiums	Poles
0	0	1

Joseph Sostilio (January 3, 1915 – July 9, 2000) was an auto racing driver from Natick, Massachusetts. He was born in Newton Centre, Massachusetts. He was a midget and stockcar driver.

In 1932, at the age of 17, Sostilio won the first race he entered, driving a Model A Ford. By 1935, Sostilio had added a championship to his resume by capturing the New England Dirt Championship. He repeated as champion in 1936 and 1938. He captured the 1939 Vermont State Midget Championship.

In 1941, Sostillo finished fourth in the first Midget race at the Williams Grove Speedway.

When the war ended, Sostillo returned to the Midget ranks with the Bay State Midget Racing Association, losing the championship to Bob Blair by one point. In 1946, he piloted the Koopman Offenhauser and finished 4th in BSMRA points, competing at tracks from Seekonk, Massachusetts, to Akron, Ohio. In 1947, Sostilio piloted the #54 Leader Card Offy to win the Bay State Midget title on the strength of 31 wins, 23 seconds and 12 third-place finishes. Victories from that season included the first-ever race at Westboro Speedway, and another during the inaugural season of the Lonsdale Sports Arena in Rhode Island.

In 1948, Sostilio finished sixth in United Car Owners Association points, driving for the MacLeod Racing Team with Johnny Thomson.

In 1949, Sostilio turned his focus to stockcar racing, traveling from New England to South Bend, Indiana, for three consecutive weeks and winning the trophy each time. In AAA competition, Sostilio won seven races between 1948 and 1950 at tracks in South Bend, Akron, Miami, and Heidelberg, Pennsylvania. Sostilio also became a frequent competitor in the California winter circuits during this time.

In the early 1950s, Sostillo competed in the AAA Big Cars alongside his teammate, Indianapolis 500 winner Johnnie Parsons. Joe beat Tommy Hinnershitz to win the 1953 AAA Eastern Sprint Car Championship.

Sostilio's career-best finish on the AAA/Champ Car circuit was a pair of seventh-place efforts at Langhorne Speedway and Darlington Speedway in 1954.

Sostillo died on July 9, 2000, at the age of 85.

== Awards ==
Sostilio become a Hall of Fame member when he was inducted into the New England Auto Racers Hall of Fame and the National Midget Auto Racing Hall of Fame. He was inducted in the National Sprint Car Hall of Fame in 2011. In 2021, Sostillo was honored at the New England Racing Museums Legends Day event.
