= Vintonville Historic District =

Historic district in Massachusetts, United States

- U.S. National Register of Historic Places
- U.S. Historic district
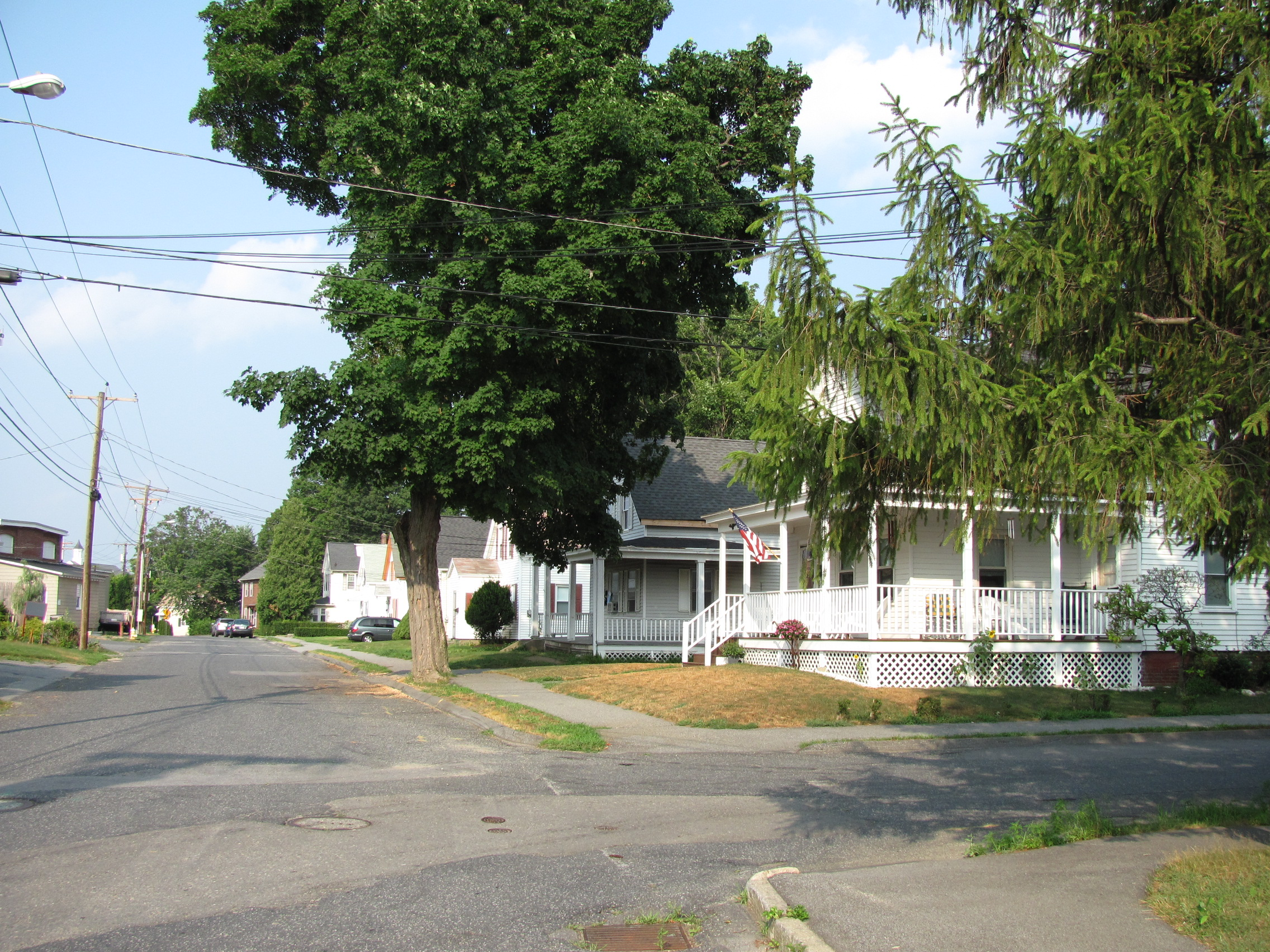
- Cottage Street

- Location within Massachusetts Location within the United States
- Location: Westborough, Massachusetts
- Coordinates: 42°15′59″N 71°36′33″W
- Area: 20 acres (8.1 ha)
- NRHP reference No.: 06000717
- Added to NRHP: August 23, 2006

The Vintonville Historic District is a residential historic district to the east of the center of Westborough, Massachusetts. The 20-acre (8.1 ha) district includes 80 properties on Cottage, Elm, Spruce, Green, Pine, Brigham, Cedar, South, and Beach Streets. The area, which consists of modestly sized houses built on smaller lots mainly between 1860 and 1890, is named for Otis Vinton, who platted out some of the early streets in the area.

The district was listed on the National Register of Historic Places in 2006.

== See also ==
- National Register of Historic Places listings in Worcester County, Massachusetts
