= Jonah Warren House =

Historic house in Massachusetts, United States

- U.S. National Register of Historic Places
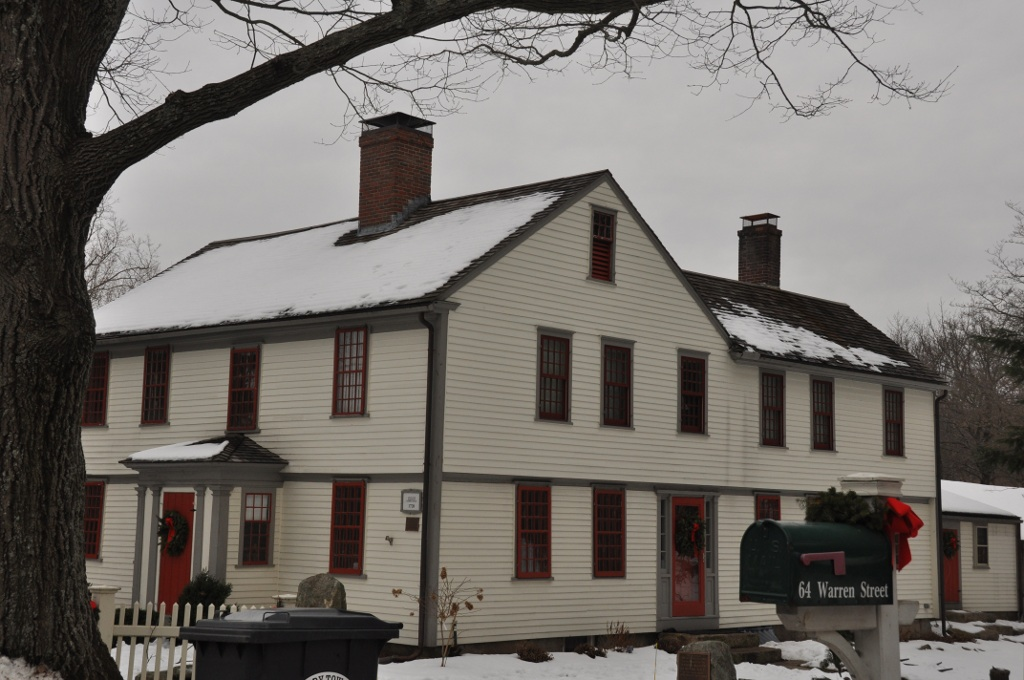

- Location within Massachusetts Location within the United States
- Location: Westborough, Massachusetts
- Coordinates: 42°14′54″N 71°36′12″W
- Built: 1725
- Architectural style: Colonial
- NRHP reference No.: 98001331
- Added to NRHP: November 5, 1998

The Jonah Warren House, located at 64 Warren Street in Westborough, Massachusetts, is a historic 2½-story wood-frame house. Estimated to have been built in the 1720s, it ranks among Westborough's oldest buildings. The house was constructed along the Old Connecticut Path, a former Native American trail. Jonah Warren, a tanner who moved to Westborough in 1719 and likely built the house, also contributed to constructing the town's first meetinghouse.

The property was added to the National Register of Historic Places in 1998.

== See also ==
- National Register of Historic Places listings in Worcester County, Massachusetts
