= Ella Lonsdale =

English boxer (born 2007)

Personal information
- Born: 16 March 2007 (age 19)

Sport
- Sport: Boxing
- Weight class: Lightweight
- Club: Sunderland East End ABC
Medal record
Women's amateur boxing
Representing England
World Boxing U19 Championships
Gold medal – first place	2024 Colorado	60kg
European Junior Boxing Championships
Gold medal – first place	2022 Montesilvano	54 kg
Bronze medal – third place	2023 Ploiesti	57 kg
European Youth Boxing Championships
Bronze medal – third place	2024 Poreč	60 kg

Ella Lonsdale (born 16 March 2007) is an English amateur boxer. She won the gold medal in the 60 kg category at the 2024 World Boxing Under-19 Championships.

== Career ==
Having started boxing aged 10, Lonsdale won the gold medal in the 54 kg division at the 2022 European Junior Boxing Championships in Montesilvano, Italy.

She had to settle for bronze medals at the 2023 European Junior and 2024 European Youth championships.

Moving onto the global stage and now with four national titles under her belt, Lonsdale got back onto the top step of the podium by taking the 60 kg category gold medal at the inaugural World Boxing Under-19 Championships held in Pueblo, Colorado, USA, in November 2024.

== Personal life ==
Away from the boxing ring, Lonsdale helps run her family coving business.
