= Catherine Amelia Ewing =

American educator, missionary, philanthropist, activist, social reformer (1822–1897)

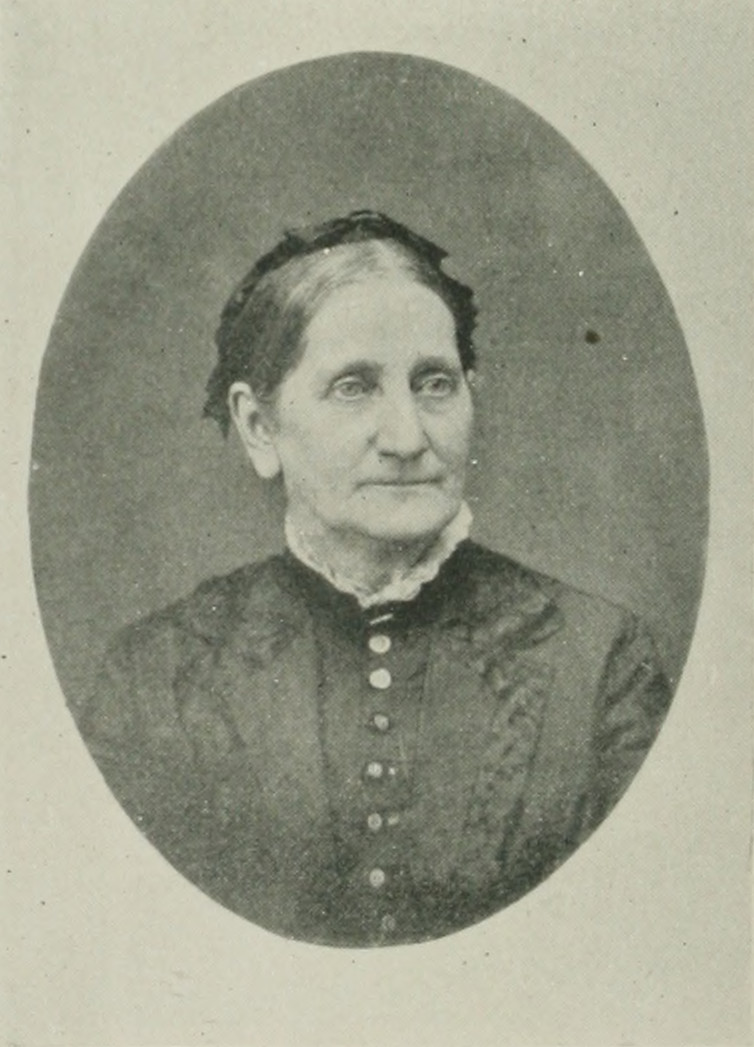
- Engraving of Ewing from the 1893 book A Woman of the Century
- Born: Catherine Amelia Fay; July 18, 1822; Westborough, Massachusetts, U.S.
- Died: April 4, 1897 (aged 74)
- Other names: Aunt Katie
- Education: Marietta Female Seminary
- Occupations: Educator; missionary; philanthropist; activist; social reformer
- Spouse: Archibald S. D. Ewing (m. 1866)
- Children: 5

Catherine Amelia Ewing (née Fay; July 18, 1822 - April 4, 1897) was an American educator, missionary, philanthropist, activist, and social reformer from the U.S. state of Massachusetts. In 1857, she took in children from the Washington County Infirmary, thus organizing the first children's home in the state of Ohio.

Ewing taught school in Ohio before becoming a missionary among the Choctaw. Ten years later, upon her return to Ohio, she founded a home for destitute children. Through her efforts, the Ohio Legislature passed a bill in Columbus, which entitled every county to establish a children's home. Ewing also authored a comprehensive historical report on the origin and growth of the children's home movement in Washington County.

== Early life and education ==
Catherine Amelia Fay was born in Westborough, Massachusetts on July 18, 1822. Her parents, William (a veteran of the War of 1812) and Elizabeth (Lankton) Fay, lived comfortably. She was the seventh of eleven children, of whom all grew up and nine reached an advanced age. On her father's side, Ewing was descended from Huguenot ancestry. Through the mother's influence, the 12 children became Christians in early life. Ewing's mother was of Scotch descent, and in the long line of Christian ancestors, there were many ministers and missionaries.

In 1835, the family removed to Washington County, Ohio, and settled 1 mile (1.6 km) east of Marietta, near Marietta College. The father came here both to aid the struggling college and to give his sons the benefit of its advantages. Ewing attended the Marietta Female Seminary, remaining in Marietta through her girlhood, even as her health began to decline.

== Career ==
=== Educator and missionary ===
Ewing offered herself to the American Board for Foreign Mission work among the Native Americans, who were at that time included in the field of the Board's activities. She was 18 when she left home and became a mission teacher among the Choctaw, who had been removed in 1830 from their homes in the South to Indian Territory. Her salary as a teacher was US$100 a year plus her board. For 10 years, she labored among the Choctaw, much of the time the only non-Native American among them, living 40 miles (64 km) beyond the nearest post office.

In the fall of 1853, while working as a missionary among the Choctaw, a physician called upon Ewing and asked her to visit a poor family where the mother, a New England woman, had died leaving five small children. They had been committed to his care, and he was trying to find homes for them, their drunken father having deserted them. The physician wanted Ewing to adopt a little girl who as two years old. She took the youngest for a little while, and became deeply attached to the child, but she felt the decision was impracticable as she was a poor teacher, hundreds of miles from home. The child was then taken by a married couple. Following a drunken fight, the child was thrown down the steps of the house and killed. This affected Ewing so deeply that she became determined to have a home of her own where she could care for orphan and homeless children. To achieve this objective, she began saving every dollar possible. Eventually, however, malaria and nervous exhaustion compelled her return to Marietta.

=== Philanthropist ===
Her father, sympathizing with her purpose, assisted Ewing to some extent, so from these and other sources she gathered a modest amount from sympathetic friends, borrowed $150, till her resources amounted to $500. In 1857, she purchased 12 acres (4.9 ha) of land at Moss Run, about 15 miles (24 km) east of Marietta, and set about building. Meanwhile, soon after her return from the missionary work, she had chanced to visit the county infirmary, and was drawn to the young children there, living in the same environment with adults. These children were often diseased and depraved, but she fell in love with them nonetheless, and determined to make for them a home. Many thought her crazy, others suspected a moneymaking scheme, some appreciated her motives and sacrifices and helped her.

On 1 April 1858, in a cottage of two rooms, she received from the County Poor House, nine children, all under 10 years of age. The county agreed to pay her $1.00 a week (The Marietta Register said the sum was $0.75 a week) and half the expense of medical attendance and burial in case of death. Each child was to have a new suit of clothes when brought to her, but for all other needs she was herself to be responsible.

The first few weeks were very hard ones, the trustees of the district school refusing to allow the children to attend school because they were paupers, and they were unwilling to have their own children associate with them. After a lawsuit, she obtained permission to send them to school, but the children were taunted as poorhouse children. A few months later, before the ensuing winter, she moved into the new home with 20 rooms, and the first children's home was an accomplished fact. Its cost was $2000, and in five years, $4000 had been expended on the property. She also built her own schoolhouse and engaged a teacher.

After the American Civil War broke out in 1861, many soldiers' children were added to her care. Her allowance for the increased cost of living was brought up to $1.25 a week and in response to her appeal for such children, the State opened at Xenia, Ohio, a home for soldiers' orphans. For 10 years, she successfully managed the home and cared for 101 needy children of Washington County. She faced problems of feeding and clothing so many, especially in war times, when prices went up and the attention of those who had helped her before was drawn away. There was also the issue of sickness when diphtheria and scarlet fever invaded the home.

=== Activist ===
But Ewing knew that the need of other counties was as great and some even greater. As early as 1862, she began an "agitation" for a State law in behalf of neglected children. She personally went to Columbus and pleaded with the Legislature. In 1864, she conferred with the commissioners about the process at the state legislature to bring about this change. The bill was presented that year but failed. In 1865, it was again presented and rejected. Finally in 1866, a bill prepared by Hon. Samuel S. Knowles of Washington County was passed, authorizing the county commissioners throughout the state to establish children's homes. So the plan which she at first thought of only as a relief to her own Children's Home became in the course of time the means of creating homes in the different counties of the state.

Washington County was one of the first to act under this law, and a farm of 100 acres (40 ha) was purchased for this purpose. When all was ready for the children's arrival, she was asked to take the superintendency of the home, in 1870. But she declined the offer as she had married by then.

== Personal life ==
In 1866, at the age of 44, she married Archibald S. D. Ewing (1828-1900), who had been an adviser and assistant on her farm. After 1867, she lived quietly in Marietta, still active in good works. For many years, she taught the primary department of the Presbyterian Sunday School, and was “Aunt Katie” to a large part of the children and young people in the upper part of the city. She was interested in the temperance cause.

Though the Ewings had no natural children, Mrs. Ewing had adopted five. She died April 4, 1897, leaving her property by will to the Missionary Society of the women of Marietta but this society had a temporary existence and had disbanded at the time of the death of her husband, so by direction of the Probate Court it was divided among her brothers and sisters and their heirs.
