= Lonsdale, Rhode Island =

Coordinates: 41°54′26″N 71°24′13″W

- Lonsdale Historic District
- U.S. National Register of Historic Places
- U.S. Historic district
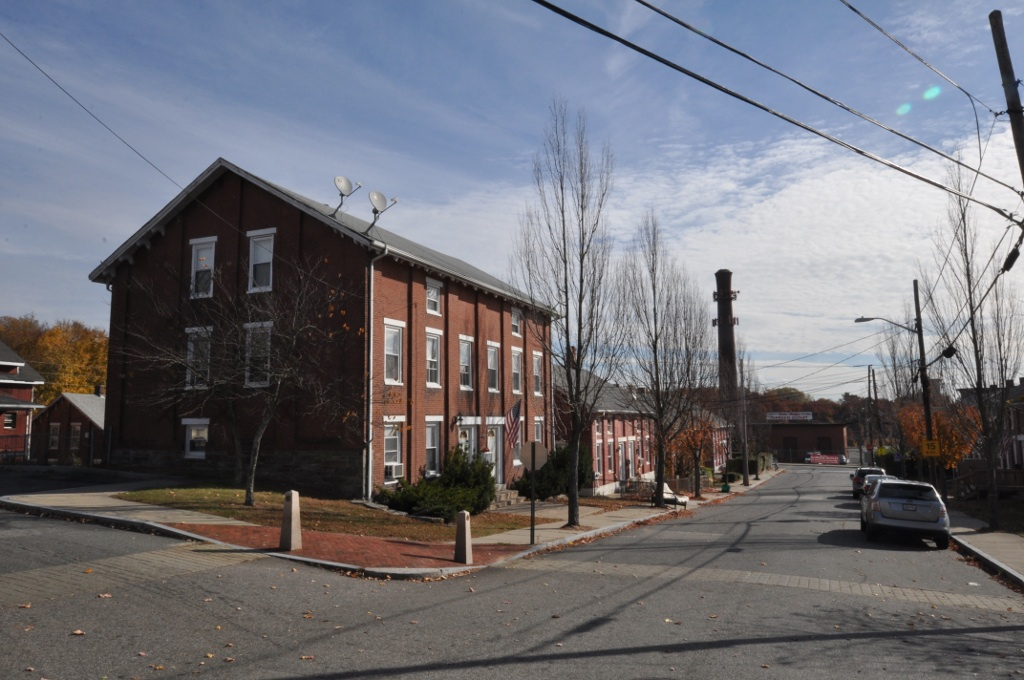
- Former worker housing on the Cumberland side of Lonsdale

- Location within Rhode Island Location within the United States
- Location: Lonsdale (Cumberland and Lincoln), Rhode Island
- Built: 1830
- Architect: Multiple
- Architectural style: Late 19th And 20th Century Revivals, Greek Revival, Late Victorian
- NRHP reference No.: 84002022
- Added to NRHP: May 25, 1984

Lonsdale (also known as Londsdale) is a village and historic district in Lincoln and Cumberland, Rhode Island, United States, near Rhode Island Route 146 and Route 95. The village was originally part of the town of Smithfield until Lincoln was created in the 1870s, and was originally centered on the Lincoln side of the Blackstone River. William Blaxton settled in the area in 1635. In the nineteenth and early twentieth centuries, Lonsdale was home to several manufacturers including the Lonsdale Company's Bleachery, and the Ann & Hope mill was also located in the village in Cumberland.

The historic district encompasses a variety of mill-related resources in the central part of Lonsdale. Mill worker housing along Front, John, Lonsdale, and Main Streets is included on the Lincoln side of the Blackstone, while the Ann & Hope factory complex in Cumberland is included, as are mill housing areas on Blackstone Court and on Main, Cross, and Blackstone Streets.

In 1922, it's textile mills were temporarily shutdown by the New England Textile Strike over an attempted wage cut and hours increase. During which on July 10, ten families in Lonsdale were evicted from their homes owned by the mill they had worked for.

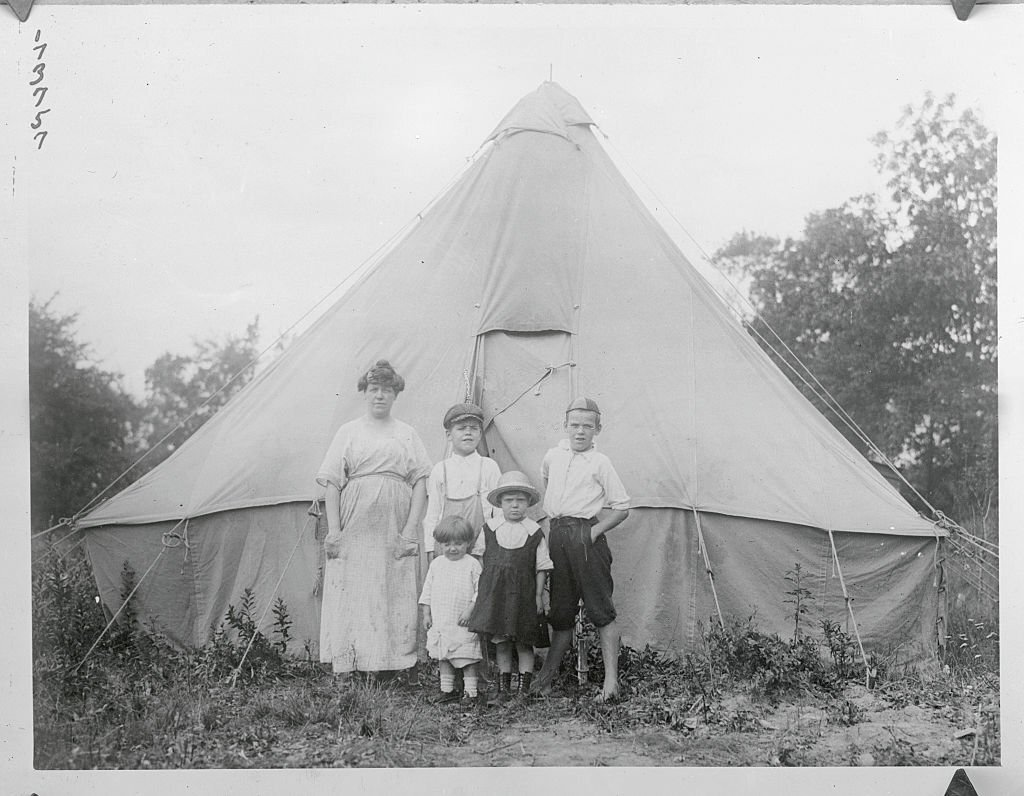
Family in tent after being evicted during New England Textile Strike from company owned home Lonsdale, R.I – July 15, 1922

== See also ==
- Lonsdale Sports Arena, a race track that operated from 1947 to 1956
- National Register of Historic Places listings in Providence County, Rhode Island
