= Lonsdale Sisters =

The Lonsdale Sisters were a dancing duo consisting of Pauline Cingalee & Florence Samuels who performed on numerous variety shows throughout the United Kingdom in the 1940s through until the early 1950s. Their dance routine's consisted of synchronised choreography as well as tap dance. Their most notable tour was in 1952 in which they worked as a support act for Laurel & Hardy and struck up a lifelong friendship with the world-famous duo.

== Stage career ==
Pauline was the slightly younger of the two girls and already a skilled dancer at a young age when she was touring with her father who was a stage magician known as the Great Cingalee. Pauline met Florence while on tour with their families and a close friendship soon developed. After Pauline taught her new friend how to tap dance her father suggested Florence should tour with them as a dancing double act. The girls agreed and so the Lonsdale Sisters were born.

Through the years they developed their act and were soon appearing on the bill in their own right. Although they were not real sisters by blood in 1947 Florence married Pauline's uncle who was working and touring with them as a stage hand, therefore making the long-time friends aunt and niece.

== The 1952 Tour with Laurel & Hardy ==
In 1952 the Lonsdale's worked as a support act for Laurel & Hardy during their 9-month-long tour of the United Kingdom through 28 towns and cities, performing an average of 14 shows a week. As well as always opening the show with their “Rhythm” dance routine and performing after the shows interval the Lonsdale's would also work as the Great Cingalee's assistants in his magic act. As well as the Lonsdale Sisters there were 7 other acts on the programme with the final act being a comedy sketch performed by Laurel & Hardy entitled “A Spot of Trouble”

During the long tour Laurel & Hardy developed a close friendship with the Lonsdale Sisters. When the tour came to an end Laurel & Hardy returned to America but would keep in contact with the girls often sending them hand written letters & signed photos with personal messages to Pauline, Florence & their families. Laurel & Hardy would regularly read the variety paper to check on their old touring buddies lives and would send hand written letters of congratulations to the girls during special occasions like Pauline's wedding and the birth of the girl's children. Some of these pictures and letters can be seen in the book A Spot of Trouble in Southend which makes a detailed in-depth account of Laurel & Hardy's performance in Southend in August 1952.

== Life after the Lonsdale Sister ==
=== Florence Samuels ===
The Lonsdale Sisters career was finished towards the end of 1953 when Florence took time off from the stage due to her being pregnant with her second child, she gave birth to her second son in 1954 and made the difficult decision to turn her back on showbiz and concentrate on being a full-time mother and wife. Florence Samuels lived out the rest of her life in the seaside town of Cleethorpes in North East Lincolnshire and never returned to the stage.

=== Pauline Cingalee ===
After giving birth to her first daughter in 1955 Pauline followed in her father's footsteps and returned to the stage as a magician working under her new stage name Paula Lee. Her magic went on to be seen on stage in clubs, cabaret shows and on television. Keeping with family tradition Pauline went on to perform with her two daughters. The act of Paula Lee, Claudi and Shelli became a permanent trio from 1974 till 1982.
