= HMAS Lonsdale =

One ship and one naval depot of the Royal Australian Navy (RAN) have been named HMAS Lonsdale, after William Lonsdale, who supervised the founding of the settlement at Port Phillip (now known as Melbourne).

- HMAS Lonsdale, a torpedo boat operated by the Victorian colonial navy (as HMVS Lonsdale) from 1888 until 1901, the Colonial Naval Forces until 1911, and the RAN until 1912
- HMAS Lonsdale (naval base), a naval depot at Port Melbourne, Victoria, which operated from 1940 until 1992
