= Westboro Speedway =

Former race track in the U.S. state of Massachusetts

- Westboro Speedway, circa 1984
- Location: Route 9, Westborough, Massachusetts
- Coordinates: 42.281°N 71.647°W
- Capacity: 7,500 (approx.)
- Opened: 1947 (78 years ago)
- Closed: 1985 (40 years ago)
- Construction cost: $100,000

Oval
- Surface: Asphalt
- Length: 1/4 miles (0.4 km)

Westboro Speedway, also known as Westboro Sports Stadium, was a one-quarter mile (0.40 km) banked and paved oval race track located in Westborough, Massachusetts, that operated from 1947 through 1985. It featured various types of racing including super-modified and midget cars.

== History ==
The track was built by Allied Sports Association, a group of five former World War II soldiers, on land that had been part of a farm owned by the DeBoer family. Construction cost was reported as $100,000 (equivalent to $1,408,197 in 2024). The first race at the speedway was held on August 5, 1947.

Notable drivers to race at the speedway included Joe Sostilio in the track's inaugural season, and Geoff Bodine and Ron Bouchard in the mid-1970s. In 1982, the track hosted two races on the NASCAR North Tour, one in June and one in September. The final race held at the speedway was contested on September 14, 1985.

In addition to its use as a race track, the facility was also a venue for musical performances. Boston-based Aerosmith played at the speedway on August 18, 1974, and the Gregg Allman Band played at the speedway in 1983.

After the track closed and was razed, a strip mall branded as Speedway Plaza was constructed on the site.

=== Incidents ===
- On May 25, 1962, a spectator from Gardner, Massachusetts, was killed at the speedway when a race car went into the crowd.
- On June 19, 1965, a driver from Schenectady, New York, was killed during a race at the track.
- On August 28, 1965, a driver from South Grafton, Massachusetts, was killed during a race at the track.

== Sources ==
- Brown, Allan (2017). The History of America's Speedways: Past and Present. Slideways Publications. ISBN 978-0692835562.
