= Nathan Fisher House =

Historic house in Massachusetts, United States

- U.S. National Register of Historic Places
- U.S. Historic district – Contributing property
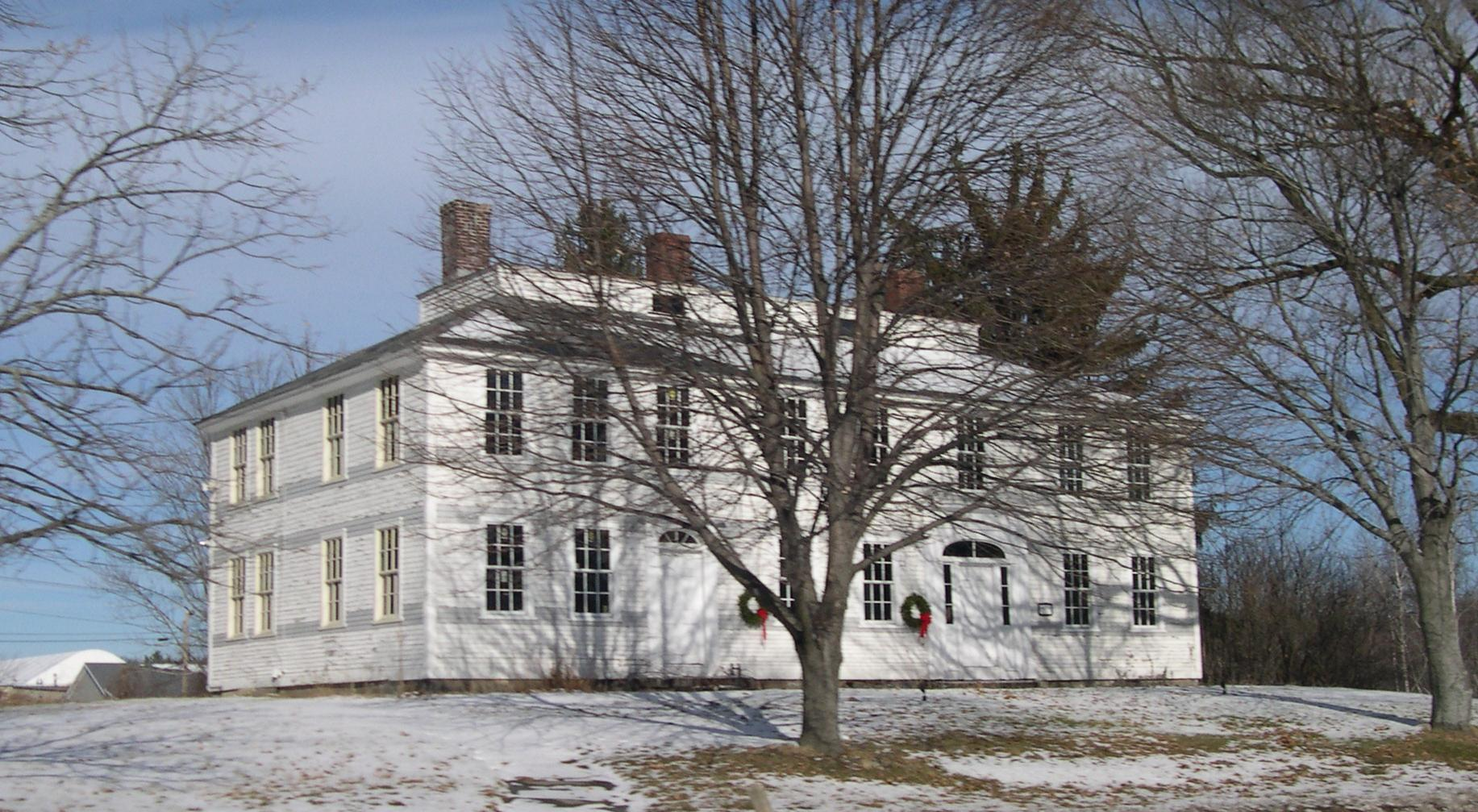

- Location within Massachusetts Location within the United States
- Nearest city: 146 Oak Street, Westborough, Massachusetts
- Coordinates: 42°17′3″N 71°37′30″W
- Built: 1820
- Architectural style: Federal
- Part of: Lyman School for Boys (ID94000693)
- NRHP reference No.: 80001679

Significant dates
- Added to NRHP: March 25, 1980
- Designated CP: July 25, 1994

The Nathan Fisher House is a historic house in Westborough, Massachusetts.

== Description and history ==
The wood frame Federal style house was built c. 1820 by Nathan Fisher, who had married into the locally prominent Lothrop family. Fisher operated a store, which fell into decline after the area was bypassed by the railroad in 1834. Next to the house was also built a thread factory (no longer standing) where the first steam power was used in Westborough. The property was purchased by the state in 1884 and became part of the (now closed) Lyman School for Boys.

The house was listed on the National Register of Historic Places in 1980, and included in the historic district encompassing the Lyman School in 1994.

== See also ==
- National Register of Historic Places listings in Worcester County, Massachusetts
