= Florey Institute of Neuroscience and Mental Health =

Australian medical research institute

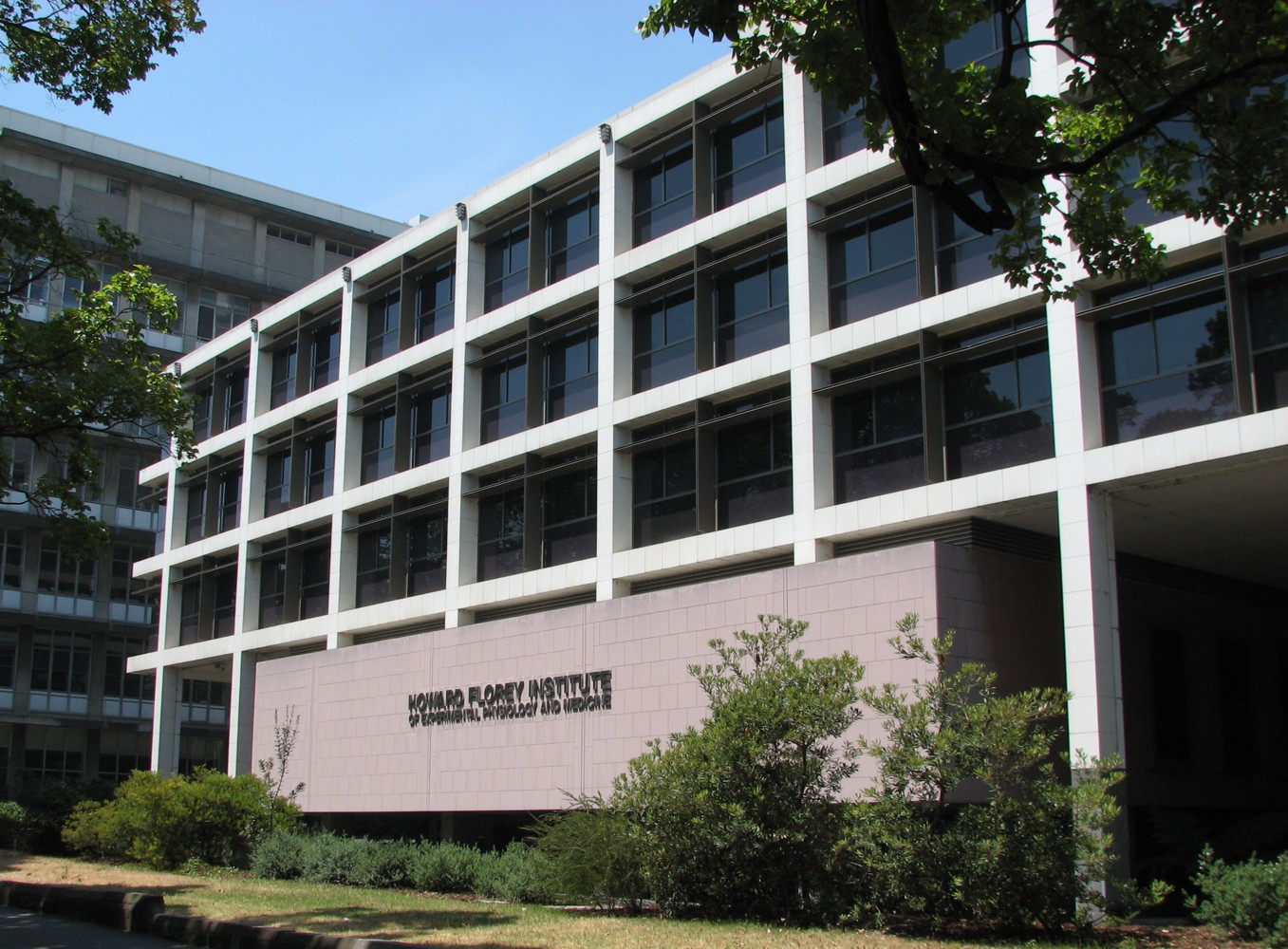
- The Howard Florey Institute, pictured in 2006
- Chair: Harold Mitchell AC
- Director: Professor Peter van Wijngaarden
- Faculty: University of Melbourne
- Adjunct faculty: Austin Hospital, Melbourne
- Staff: approx. 500
- Formerly called: Howard Florey Institute of Experimental Physiology and Medicine
- Location: Royal Parade, Parkville and Burgundy Street, Heidelberg, Melbourne, Victoria, Australia
- Coordinates: 37°47′53″S 144°57′31″E
- Interactive map of Florey Institute of Neuroscience and Mental Health
- Website: www.florey.edu.au

The Florey Institute of Neuroscience and Mental Health, more commonly known as The Florey, is an Australian medical research institute that undertakes research into treatments for brain and mind disorders. Named after Adelaide-born pharmacologist and pathologist Howard Florey, the institute's areas of interest include Parkinson's disease, stroke, motor neurone disease, addiction, epilepsy, multiple sclerosis, autism, Huntington's disease, depression, schizophrenia, brain function in health and disease, heart failure, and dementia.

Affiliated with the University of Melbourne, the Austin Hospital and the Royal Melbourne Hospital, the institute is located in the Melbourne suburbs of Parkville and Heidelberg in Victoria. It is the largest brain research group in the southern hemisphere and employs approximately 600 staff and students. The institute is led by its director, Professor Peter van Wijngaarden.

== History ==
The origins of the institute are based on the 1947 work of the founder, Dr. Derek Denton, and the investigation of the team of scientists, Prof R D Wright, Prof J P Coghlan and Prof Marelyn Wintour-Coghlan into the control of salt and water balance in health and disease.

The institute was formally established in 1971 by the Victorian Government and named in honour of Howard Florey, an Australian Laureate of the 1945 Nobel Prize in Medicine who helped to isolate the active principle of penicillin and developed the first manufacturing process for the antibiotic. The institute conducted research into physiological control of body fluid and electrolyte balance, especially the regulation of the adrenal salt-retaining hormone, aldosterone; micro measurement of hormones; hybridization histochemistry; instincts that control ingestion; and the Relaxin hormone.

Previously known as the Howard Florey Institute of Experimental Physiology and Medicine, in 1997 the institute's focus broadened to encompass brain disorders. From 1997 to 2007, the neuroscientist Professor Frederick Mendelsohn AO, led the institute.

On 1 July 2007 the legislation that created the Howard Florey Institute of Experimental Physiology and Medicine was repealed, and the Florey amalgamated with the Brain Research Institute and the National Stroke Research Institute to become collectively known as the Florey Neuroscience Institutes (FNI). As part of the amalgamation process, a new research facility was constructed to house the FNI, the Mental Health Research Institute and researchers from the University of Melbourne. In 2012, with the amalgamation of the Mental Health Research Institute and the Florey Neuroscience Institutes, the Florey Institute of Neuroscience and Mental Health was formed. Research now includes psychiatric conditions such as depression, bipolar disorder and schizophrenia, and on neurodegenerative illnesses, particularly Alzheimer's disease and Parkinson's disease.

== See also ==
- Health in Australia
