= HMAS Lonsdale (naval base) =

Former Royal Australian Navy training base in Port Melbourne, Victoria

- Port Melbourne, Victoria in Australia
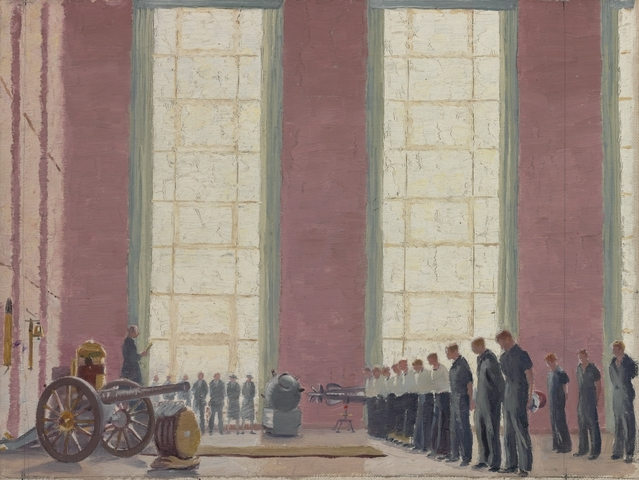
- A painting by official war artist Able Seaman Rex Julius depicting RAN personnel observing prayers during divisions at HMAS Lonsdale in 1944

Site information
- Type: Naval training base
- Operator: Royal Australian Navy

Location
- Location of the former base in Victoria
- Coordinates: 37°49′26″S 144°54′40″E

Site history
- In use: 1 August 1940 – 1992
- Fate: Decommissioned; Now a luxury apartment complex

HMAS Lonsdale is a former Royal Australian Navy (RAN) training base that was located at Beach Street, Port Melbourne, Victoria, Australia. Originally named Cerberus III, the Naval Reserve Base was commissioned as HMAS Lonsdale on 1 August 1940 during World War II.

Lonsdale was decommissioned in 1992, and the site now houses a luxury apartment complex known as HM@S Lonsdale, designed by Fender Katsalidis Architects.

== See also ==
- List of former Royal Australian Navy bases
