= Westborough, Massachusetts =

Town in Worcester County, Massachusetts, US

- Town
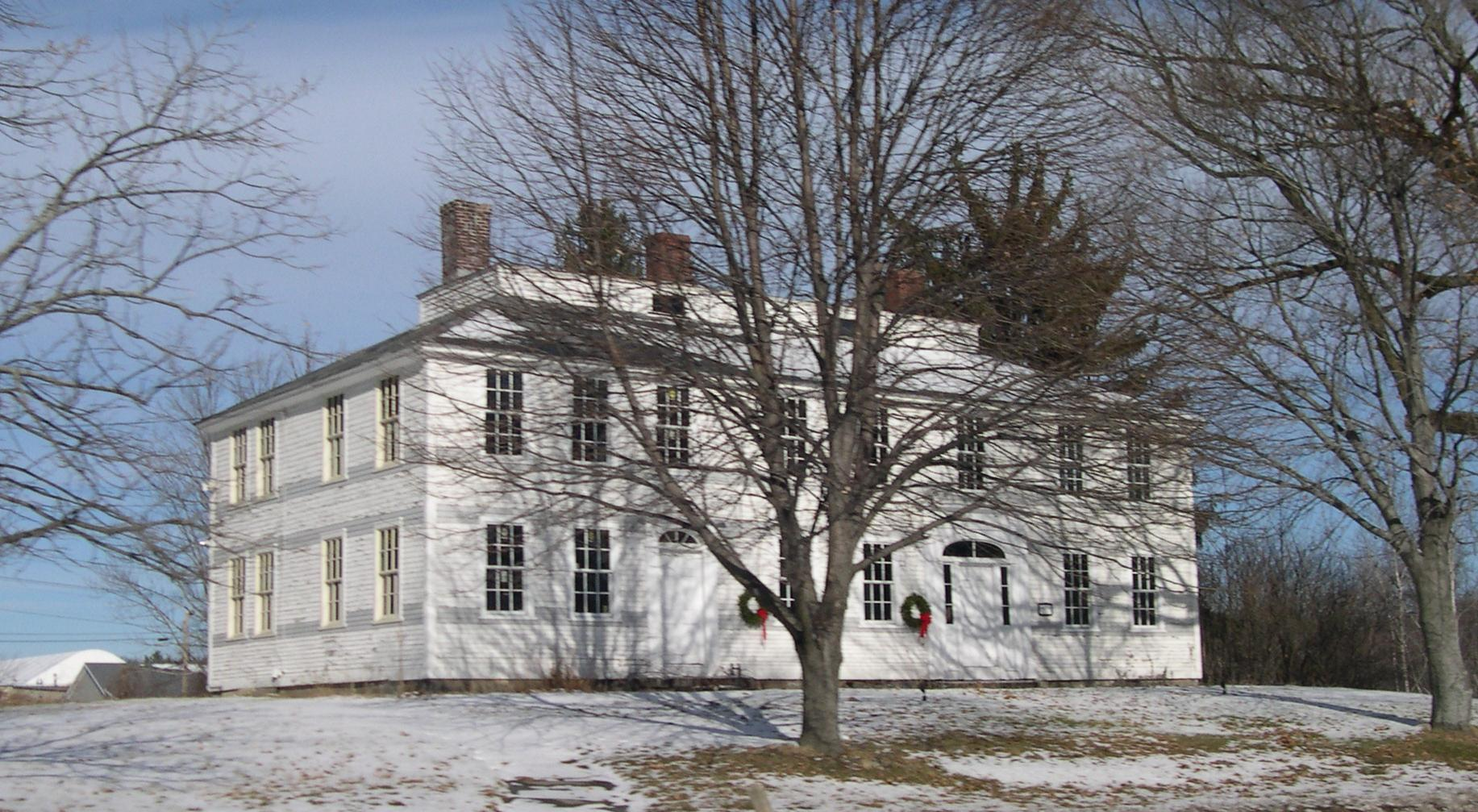
- Nathan Fisher House, Westborough

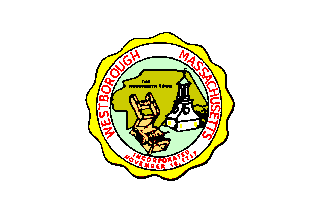
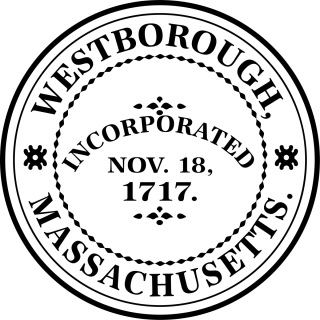
- Flag Seal

- Location in Worcester County and the state of Massachusetts.
- Coordinates: 42°16′10″N 71°37′00″W
- Country: United States
- State: Massachusetts
- County: Worcester
- Settled: 1675
- Incorporated: 1717

Government
  - Type: Open town meeting
  - Town Manager: Kristi Williams

Area
  - Total: 21.6 sq mi (56.0 km^{2})
  - Land: 20.5 sq mi (53.1 km^{2})
  - Water: 1.1 sq mi (2.8 km^{2})
- Elevation: 299 ft (91 m)

Population (2020)
  - Total: 21,567
  - Density: 1,052/sq mi (406.2/km^{2})
- Demonym: Westboronian
- Time zone: UTC−5 (Eastern (EST))
  - Summer (DST): UTC−4 (EDT)
- ZIP Code: 01581
- Area code: 508/774
- FIPS code: 25-75015
- GNIS feature ID: 0618390
- Website: www.westboroughma.gov

Westborough is a town in Worcester County, Massachusetts, United States. The population was 21,567 at the 2020 census, in over 7,000 households. It contains the census-designated place of the same name. Incorporated in 1717, the town is governed under the New England open town meeting system, headed by a five-member elected Board of Selectmen whose duties include licensing, appointing various administrative positions, and calling a town meeting of citizens annually or whenever the need arises.

== History ==
Before recorded time, the area now known as Westborough was a well-travelled crossroads. As early as 7,000 BCE, prehistoric people in dugout canoes followed the Sudbury and Assabet Rivers to their headwaters in search of quartzite for tools and weapons.

From 1200 to 1600 CE, seasonal migrations brought Nipmuc Indians to hunt and fish near Cedar Swamp and Lake Hoccomocco. Using Fay Mountain as a landmark, Indians crisscrossed Westborough on well-worn paths: the old Connecticut Path leading west from Massachusetts Bay; the Narragansett Trail leading south, and the trail (along the present Milk Street) leading to Canada.

The early English explorer John Oldham followed these trails through Westborough in 1633, and settlers in search of fertile farmlands followed not long after. By late 1675, a few families had settled near Lake Chauncy, in the "west borough" of Marlborough.

=== 18th century ===
On November 18, 1717, Westborough was incorporated as the hundredth town in Massachusetts, populated by twenty-seven families, including Thomas Rice who had represented Marlborough in the Great and General Court. Soon large farms were carved out, mills built along the Assabet River and Jackstraw Brook, and taverns flourished. Westborough's first minister, Reverend Ebenezer Parkman, shepherded the growing town of colonists through the years toward independence from Great Britain. Forty-six minutemen from Westborough fought under Captain Edmund Brigham in the Revolutionary War.

In 1775, Northborough split off as the "north borough" of Westborough, much as Westborough split off from Marlborough some 58 years before. However, the two towns shared a meetinghouse for some time more.

Westborough's most famous native son, Eli Whitney, contributed to the industrial progress of the country. Born in 1765, he invented the cotton gin in 1795 after graduating from Yale. In 1798, he introduced mass production to the United States at his Whitney Arms Company in New Haven, Connecticut.

=== 19th century ===
In 1810, the route from Boston to Worcester was straightened and improved into an official turnpike (the present Route 9), and along its Westborough route, the Wesson Tavern Common, Forbush Tavern and Nathan Fisher's store prospered. The center of commerce shifted downtown in 1824 with the arrival of the steam train through Westborough's center. The railroad brought a new era to the town industry: over the next century, local factories shipped boots and shoes, straw hats, sleighs, textiles, bicycles, and eventually abrasive products, across the nation. Westborough dairies supplied cities with milk and local greenhouses shipped out carnations, while the eight orchards found ready markets for their produce.

In 1848, the State Reform School for Boys, the first publicly funded reform school in the United States, was opened on Lake Chauncy. It operated as a State reform school until 1884 at which time the newly established Westborough State Hospital took over the property. In the same year, the reform school was relocated nearby on Chauncy Street and renamed The Lyman School for Boys.

=== 20th century ===
The town's official name was originally "Westborough" but was changed to "Westboro" in 1894, then reverted to "Westborough" in 1971. While "Westborough" is the official spelling, the Massachusetts Department of Transportation and some individuals and entities use the shorter "Westboro" for clarity and brevity.

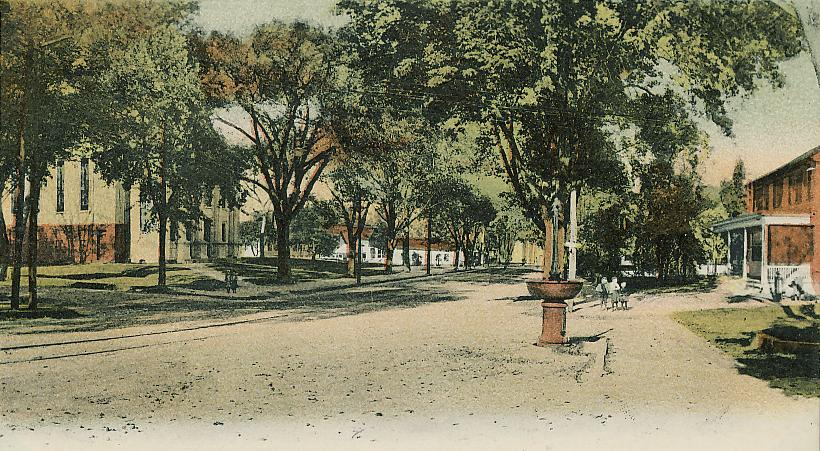
Main Street, c. 1905

From 1947 through 1985, Westboro Speedway operated as an auto racing venue.

=== Registered historic places ===
Westborough is home to several listings on the National Register of Historic Places:

- Nathan Fisher House: East of Shrewsbury on MA 9 (added April 25, 1980)
- Joseph Lothrop House: On the corner of Route 9 and Park Street. (added in 1974)
- Lyman School for Boys: Junction of Oak St. and Milk St. (added August 25, 1994)
- Maples Cottage: East of Shrewsbury on Oak St. (added April 25, 1980)
- Vintonville Historic District: Roughly bounded by Cottage, Green, Pine, Brigham, Beach Streets, and rear of properties along the east side of South Street (added August 23, 2006)
- Jonah Warren House: 64 Warren Street (added December 5, 1998)
- West Main Street Historic District: Roughly bounded by Milk, Main, Blake, and Fay streets (added July 16, 1987)
  - Expanded to include 83–118 West Main Street (1990)
- Westborough State Hospital: Along Lyman St. North of Chauncy Lake and junction of Milk St. and MA 9 (added February 21, 1994)

== Geography ==
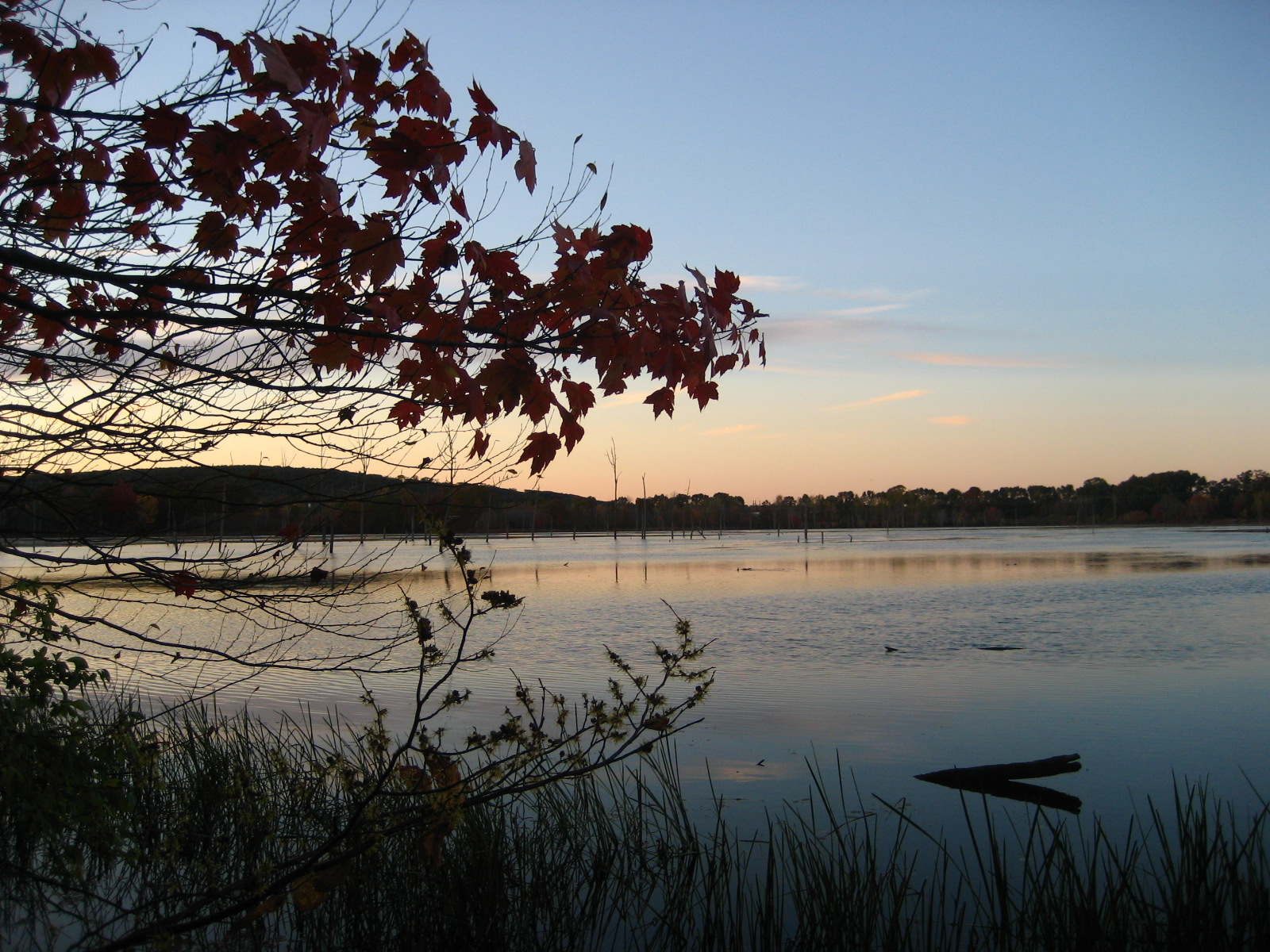
Mill Pond at sunset

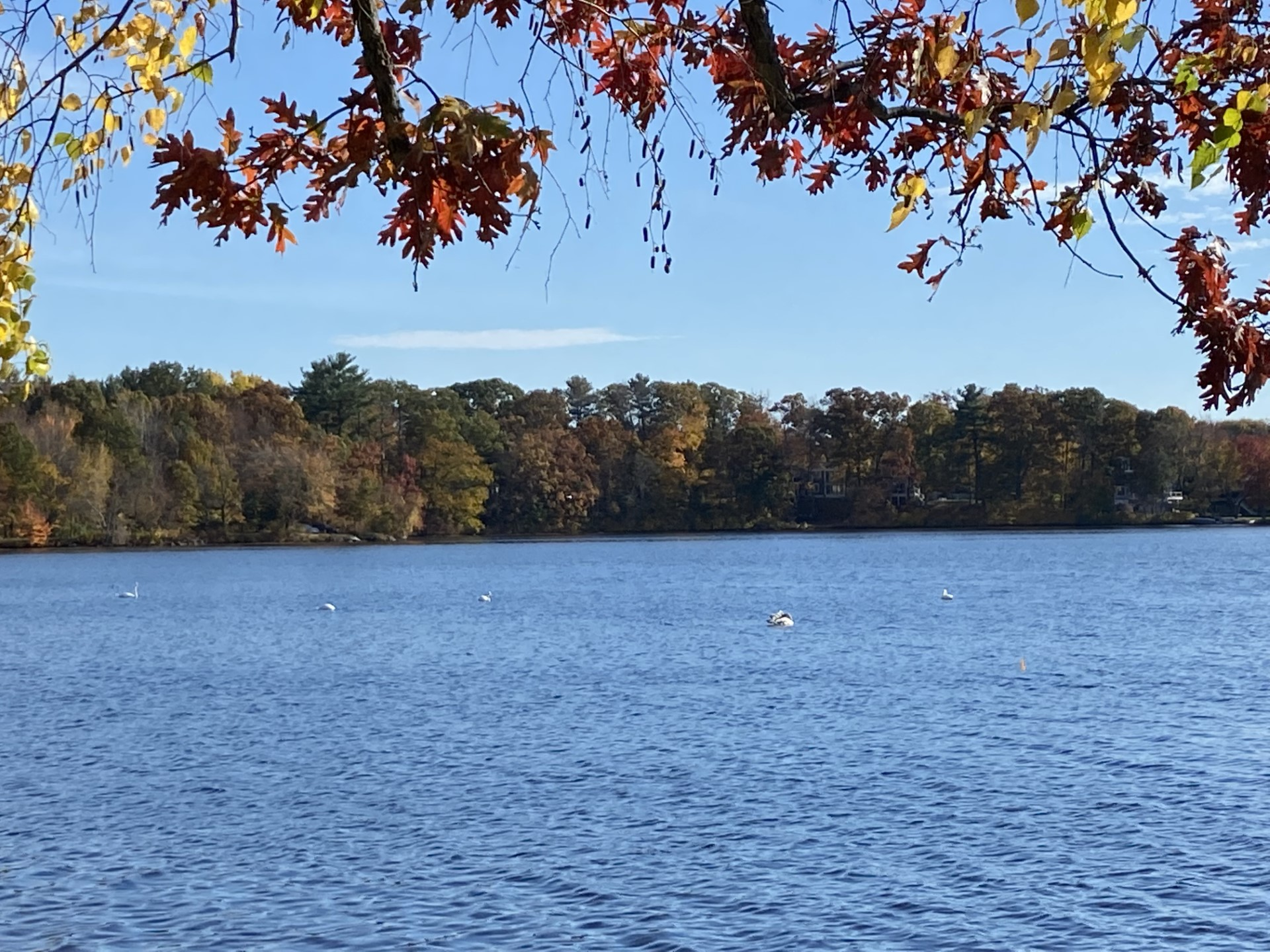
Chauncy Lake in Autumn

According to the United States Census Bureau, the town has a total area of 21.6 square miles (56.0 km^{2}), of which 20.5 square miles (53.1 km^{2}) is land, and 1.1 square miles (2.8 km^{2}) is water, or 5.09 percent.

Westborough contains the headwaters of the Sudbury and Assabet rivers. The town contains numerous bodies of water, including Lake Chauncy, George H. Nichols Reservoir (Mill Pond), Westboro Reservoir (Sandra Pond), Hocomonco Pond, and Cedar Swamp Pond. Lake Chauncy is open to swimming, boating, and fishing, and has a public beach open to residents of Westborough and Northborough during the summer months. The average elevation of the town is approximately 300 feet (91 m).

Westborough is located in the MetroWest region; a cluster of cities and towns lying west of Boston and east of Worcester, in the U.S. state of Massachusetts. The name was coined in the 1980s by a local newspaper.

== Demographics ==
Historical population
Year	Pop.	±%
1790	933	—
1850	2,371	+154.1%
1860	2,913	+22.9%
1870	3,601	+23.6%
1880	5,214	+44.8%
1890	5,195	−0.4%
1900	5,400	+3.9%
1910	5,446	+0.9%
1920	5,789	+6.3%
1930	6,409	+10.7%
1940	6,463	+0.8%
1950	7,378	+14.2%
1960	9,599	+30.1%
1970	12,594	+31.2%
1980	13,619	+8.1%
1990	14,133	+3.8%
2000	17,997	+27.3%
2010	18,272	+1.5%
2020	21,567	+18.0%
2024*	22,643	+5.0%
* = population estimate. Source: United States census records and Population Estimates Program data.

Data from the U.S. Census of 2020 shows there were 21,567 people, 7,930 households, and 5,618 families residing in the town (official). The population density was 998 people per square mile (unofficial). The latest 5-Year 2018–2023 American Community Survey (ACS) estimated the town's total population at 21,591, residing in 8,065 households. According to the latest ACS estimate, the racial makeup of the town was 61.7% White, 3.1% Black or African American, 0.1% Native American, 23% Asian, 0% Pacific Islander, 5.9% from other races, 6.2% from two or more races, Hispanic or Latino of any race were 7.8% of the population. Westborough has a significant Indian-American Community making up 17.5% of the population, as well as boasting a strong immigrant community with over 6,000 residents of non-U.S. origins (28.9%).

According to ACS estimates, there are 5,702 family households, out of which 40.2% had children under the age of 18 living with them. Of all households 31.8% were made up of individuals 65 years of age or older. The average household size was 2.61 and the average family size was 3.16.

In addition, the town the population was spread out, with 12.6% under the age of 10, 14.5% from 10 to 19, 16.3% from 20 to 34, 29.6% from 35 to 54, 11.2% from 55 to 64, and 15.7% who were 65 years of age or older. The median age was 39 years. For every 100 females, there were 95.6 males.

The median income for a household in the town (based on U.S. Census ACS five-year estimate) was $134,474, and the median income for a family was $180,329. The per capita income for the town was $68,311. Of the population 5% was below the poverty line, including 4.2% of those under age 18 and 3.8% of those age 65 or over. The labor force numbered 11,883 with an unemployment rate in the town of 3%. Of the population over age 25, 96% graduated high school (or equivalent) and 66% hold a bachelor's degree or higher.

== Education ==
=== Public schools ===
Westborough Public Schools consist of three elementary schools, two middle schools and one high school:

- Hastings Elementary School
- Armstrong Elementary School
- Annie E. Fales Elementary School
- Mill Pond School
- Sarah W. Gibbons Middle School
- Westborough High School (school mascot – Rangers)

The Mill Pond School is the newest school addition to Westborough, built in 2002. The three elementary schools consist of kindergarten to third grade, Mill Pond School consists of grades 4 to 6, then Gibbons Middle School which consists of grades 7 and 8, and then Westborough High School. There are three options depending upon residents' geographic location in the town for preschool through third grade.

== Transportation ==
The Town of Westborough is located on the west side of the Massachusetts Turnpike (Interstate 90) and Interstate 495 intersection. Route 30 (Main Street) and Route 135 (South Street/Milk Street) intersect in a rotary at the town's center, while Route 9 runs nearby, serving much of the town's commerce.

In terms of public transportation, Westborough is currently served by an MBTA commuter rail station on the Framingham/Worcester Line as well as public bus service through the Worcester Regional Transit Authority. Limited commercial airline service is available at the Worcester Regional Airport. The nearest international airport is Boston Logan Airport.

A major CSX rail freight yard serving the Boston metro area is located near the intersection of the Turnpike and I-495.

== Government and infrastructure ==
State government
State Representative(s):	Danielle Gregoire (D); Hannah Kane (R)
State Senator(s):	Jamie Eldridge (D)
Governor's Councilor(s):	Marilyn M. Petitto Devaney (D)
Federal government
U.S. Representative(s):	James P. McGovern (D-2nd District)
U.S. Senators:	Elizabeth Warren (D), Ed Markey (D)

The Robert F. Kennedy Children's Action Corps, Inc. operates two juvenile correctional facilities in Westborough on behalf of the Massachusetts Department of Youth Services:

- Robert F. Kennedy School, a juvenile correctional center for boys, is in Westborough. The school is the most secure juvenile facility in the state.
- The Fay A. Rotenberg School, a juvenile correctional facility for girls, is in Westborough. It first opened in North Chelmsford in 1982, but moved to its current location in 2006.

== Media ==
=== Newspapers ===
- The Community Advocate
- Westborough Patch
- The MetroWest Daily News (Framingham)
- The Westborough News
- The Telegram & Gazette (Worcester)
- The Boston Globe (Boston)
- Boston Herald (Boston)
- Westborough High School Literary Magazine

=== Television ===
- Channel 2: WGBH – (PBS) – Boston
- Channel 4: WBZ – (CBS) – Boston, WBZ-TV
- Channel 5: WCVB – (ABC) – Boston
- Channel 7: WHDH – (Independent) – Boston, 7 News
- Channel 25: WFXT – (FOX) – Boston, FOX 25
- Channel 27: WUNI – (Univision) – Worcester

Cablecast (Public, educational, and government access (PEG) cable TV channels):

- Channel 11: Westborough TV – Public-access television (Notices) – Westborough
- Channel 13: Westborough TV – Educational-access television and Area Schools Access Channel – Westborough High School
- Channel 12: Westborough TV – Government-access television Channel – Westborough

== Library ==
The Westborough Public Library was founded in 1857. In fiscal year 2008, the town of Westborough spent 1.24% ($846,826) of its budget on its public library—some $45 per person, per year ($59.30 adjusted for inflation to 2022).

== Points of interest ==
- Assabet Reservoir – hiking trails
- Fay Mountain – highest point in Westborough
- Lake Chauncy – swimming, boating and fishing
- Lyman School for Boys
- Westborough Charm Bracelet – hiking trail
- Westborough Country Club – semi-private 9-hole, par 36, golf club
- Eli Whitney birthplace, on Eli Whitney Street and marked with a commemorative stone
- Vintonville Historic District

== Accolades ==
- Money Magazine 2005 profile of Westborough, Massachusetts
- Money Magazine 2007 profile of Westborough, Massachusetts

== Annual events ==
- Annual Boy Scout Troop 100 Pancake Breakfast – February/March
- High School Musical – March
- Taste of the Boroughs – March
- Middle School Musical – April
- Spring Clean Up Day – April
- Spring Carnival – April
- Little League Parade – April
- Memorial Day Parade
- Purple Day – June
- Dress and act like a Pirate Day, May 12
- High School Graduation Ceremony – June
- July 4 Block Party
- Homecoming – September/October
- High School Play – November
- Middle School Play – November
- Thanksgiving Day Football game
- Christmas Singalong
- Westborough High School Winter Concert – December
- Eli Whitney Cup Playoffs (Westborough Men's Softball League) – August

== Places of worship ==
- Beth Tikvah Synagogue
- Boroughs Islamic Society
- Chabad of Westborough
- Congregation B'nai Shalom
- Evangelical Congregational Church
- First Baptist Church Westborough
- First United Methodist Church
- Good Shepherd Lutheran Church
- New Hope Chapel
- St. Luke the Evangelist Roman Catholic Church and Rectory
- St. Stephen's Episcopal Church
- Unitarian Universalist Congregational Society of Westborough
- Chapel of the Cross
- Westborough Gurdwara Sahib

== Notable people ==
- Eli Whitney Blake, inventor of stone crusher, businessman
- Mary A. Brigham, eighth President of Mount Holyoke College
- Jaime Brockett, folk singer
- Jim Butterfield, American football player and coach. Moved to Westborough as a child
- Jim Campbell, hockey player
- Henry W. Corbett, businessman and senator
- Ralph Dawson, film editor, three-time Academy Award winner
- Louis E. Denfeld, Chief of Naval Operations, United States Navy
- Mark D. Devlin, author
- Catherine Amelia Fay Ewing, educator, activist, philanthropist
- Esther Forbes, author
- Kaz Grala, NASCAR driver
- Richard B. Johnson, author
- Dan Kwan, film writer and director
- Horace Maynard, politician
- Tim McKeon, writer, director, producer
- Mike Murphy, athletics coach
- Adam Peltzman, writer/producer of Odd Squad
- Thomas Rice, politician and founding citizen
- John Ruggles, politician
- Jordan Smotherman, ice hockey player
- Jeffrey Thomas, science fiction and horror author
- Eli Whitney, inventor and industrialist
- Ashley Walden, luge athlete
- Jack M. Wilson, President of the University of Massachusetts
