= World Boxing U19 Championships =

Junior boxing world championships

- Status: Active
- Genre: Junior Boxing World Championships
- Frequency: Biennial
- Years active: 2024–present
- Inaugurated: 2024 Colorado
- Next event: 2026 Budva
- Organiser: World Boxing
- Website: Website

The World Boxing U19 Championships is an amateur boxing competition organised by World Boxing for competitors aged under 19 years.

== History ==
The first edition was held in 2024 in Pueblo, Colorado, United States with 10 weight categories for men and women. The top three teams in Medal table at this tournament were: England, India and the USA.

The second edition will held in 2026 in Budva, Montenegro with 10 weight categories for men and women.

== Editions ==
Edition	Year	Host	Dates
1	2024	(United States) Pueblo	October 26 – November 2
2	2026	(Montenegro) Budva	16–27 October

== Medal table ==
As of 2026 edition

Rank	Nation	Gold	Silver	Bronze	Total
1	England	9	0	4	13
2	India	5	9	7	21
3	Russia	5	5	0	10
4	United States	5	3	5	13
5	Uzbekistan	4	2	2	8
6	Japan	2	1	1	4
7	Kazakhstan	1	5	4	10
8	Chile	1	3	1	5
9	Ireland	1	1	4	6
10	Brazil	1	1	3	5
10	Ukraine	1	1	3	5
12	Australia	1	0	6	7
13	Wales	1	0	2	3
14	Czech Republic	1	0	1	2
15	Argentina	1	0	0	1
15	Scotland	1	0	0	1
17	Germany	0	3	3	6
18	South Korea	0	1	2	3
19	Iran	0	1	0	1
19	Latvia	0	1	0	1
19	Netherlands	0	1	0	1
19	Spain	0	1	0	1
19	Thailand	0	1	0	1
24	Canada	0	0	5	5
24	Italy	0	0	5	5
26	Algeria	0	0	4	4
27	New Zealand	0	0	3	3
28	Azerbaijan	0	0	2	2
29	Armenia	0	0	1	1
29	Cuba	0	0	1	1
29	Georgia	0	0	1	1
29	Greece	0	0	1	1
29	Hungary	0	0	1	1
29	Kyrgyzstan	0	0	1	1
29	Turkey	0	0	1	1
29	Venezuela	0	0	1	1
Totals (36 entries)		40	40	75	155

== See also ==
- World Boxing
- World Boxing Cup
- World Boxing Championships
