= List of Taft School alumni =

The following is a list of notable alumni of Taft School. The Taft School is a private, coeducational prep school located in Watertown, Connecticut, United States. The school was founded by Horace Dutton Taft, the brother of President William Howard Taft, in 1890.

== Academics ==
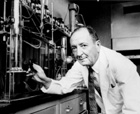
Alfred G. Gilman

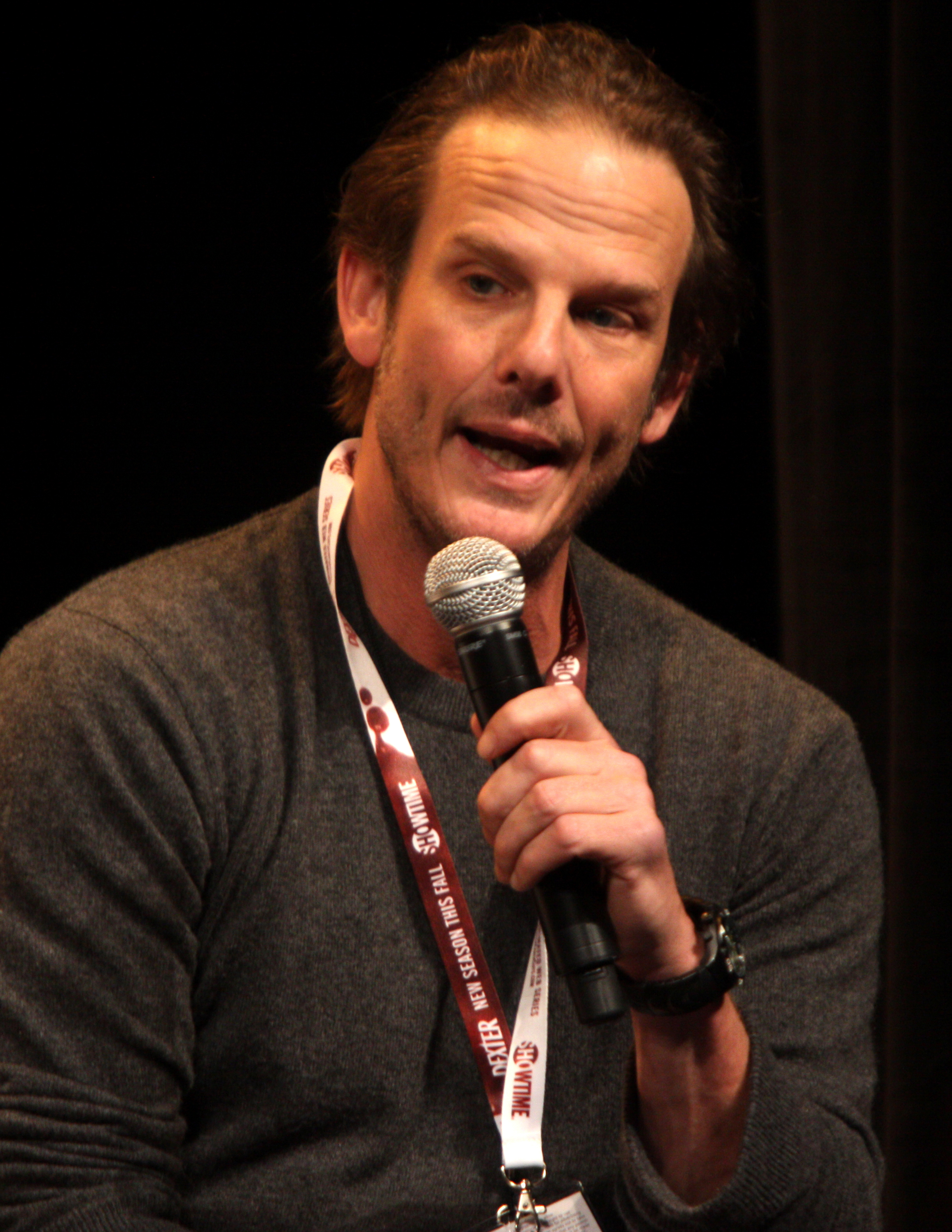
Peter Berg

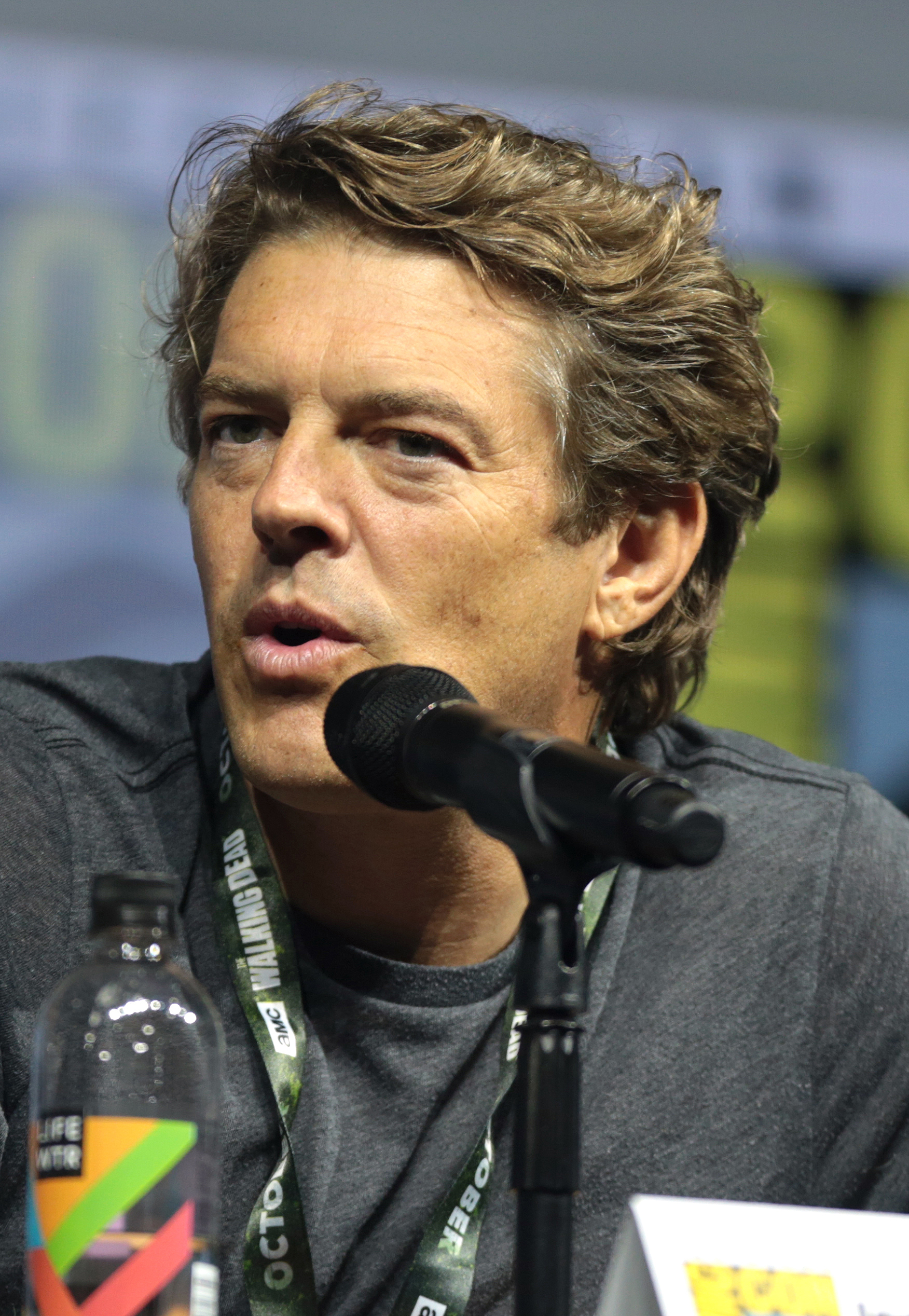
Jason Blum

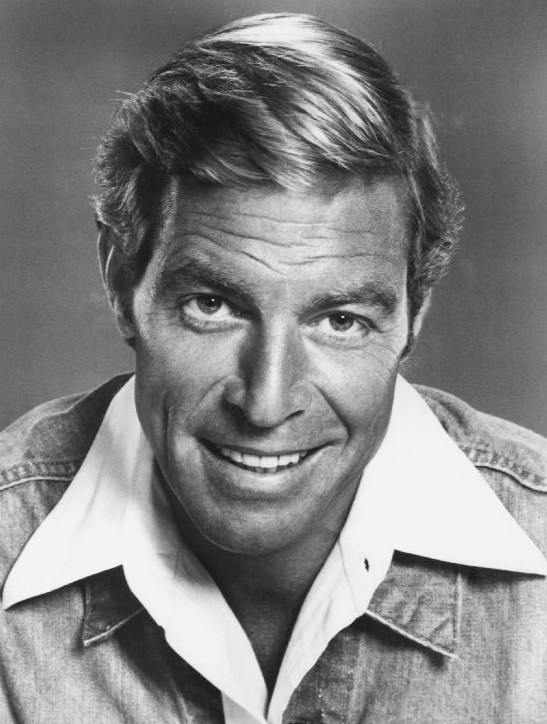
James Franciscus

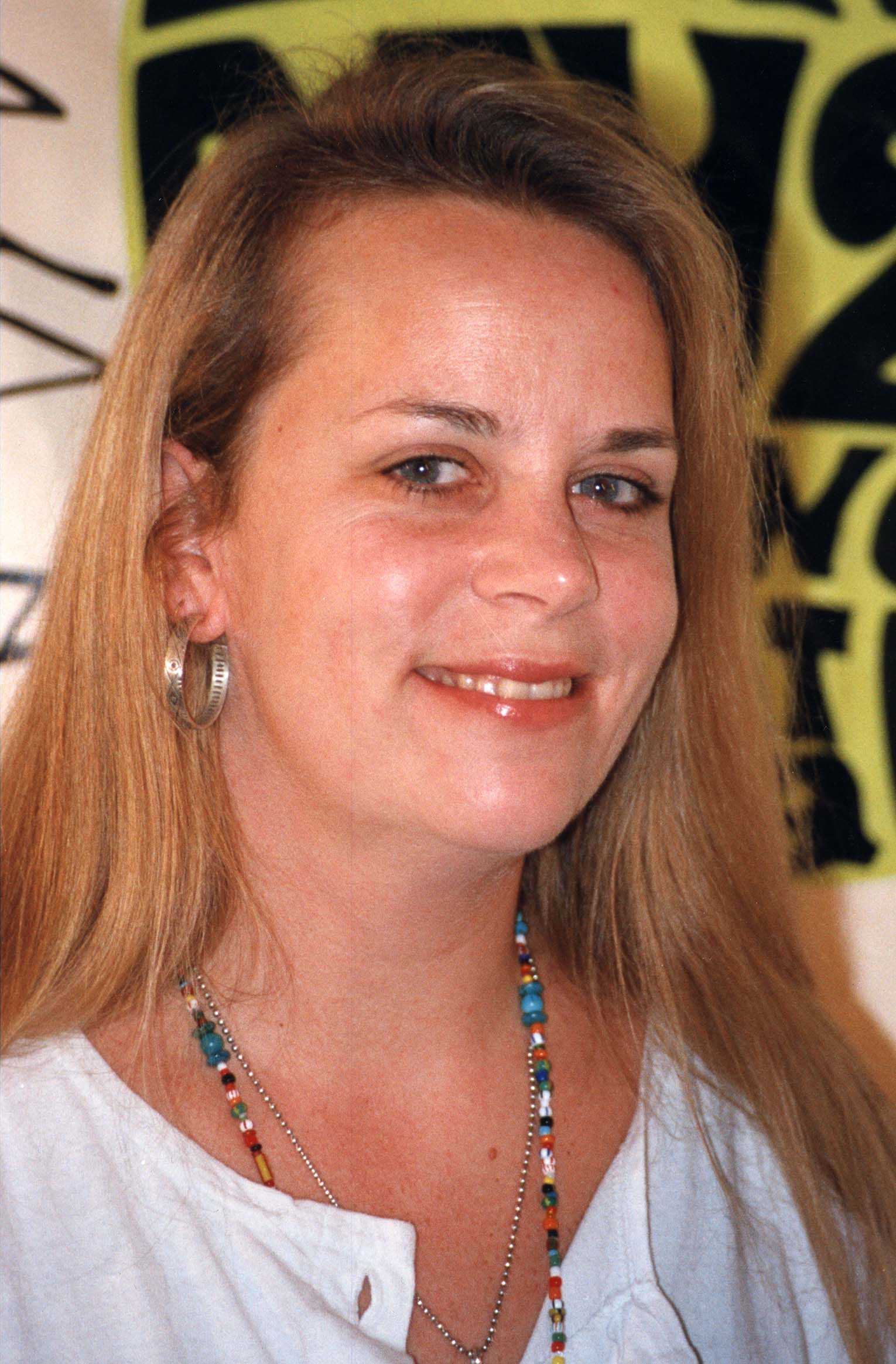
Mary Chapin Carpenter

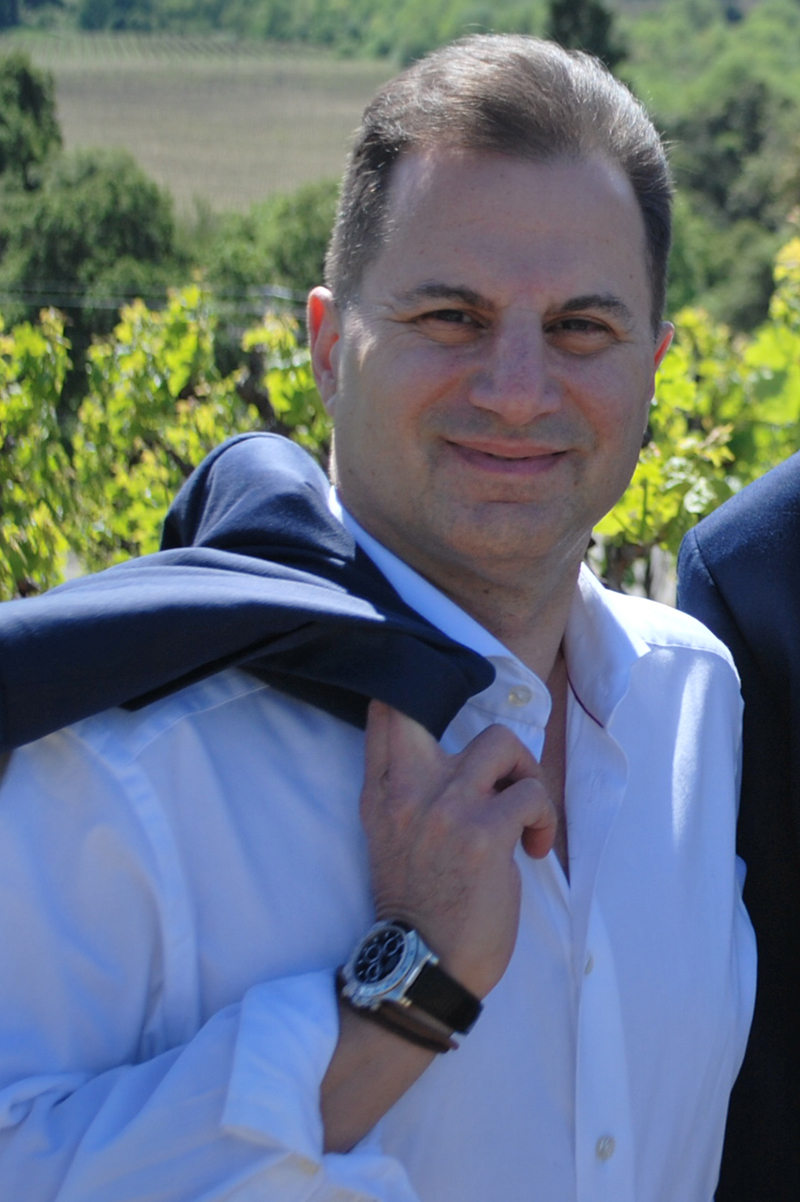
Peter S. Kaufman

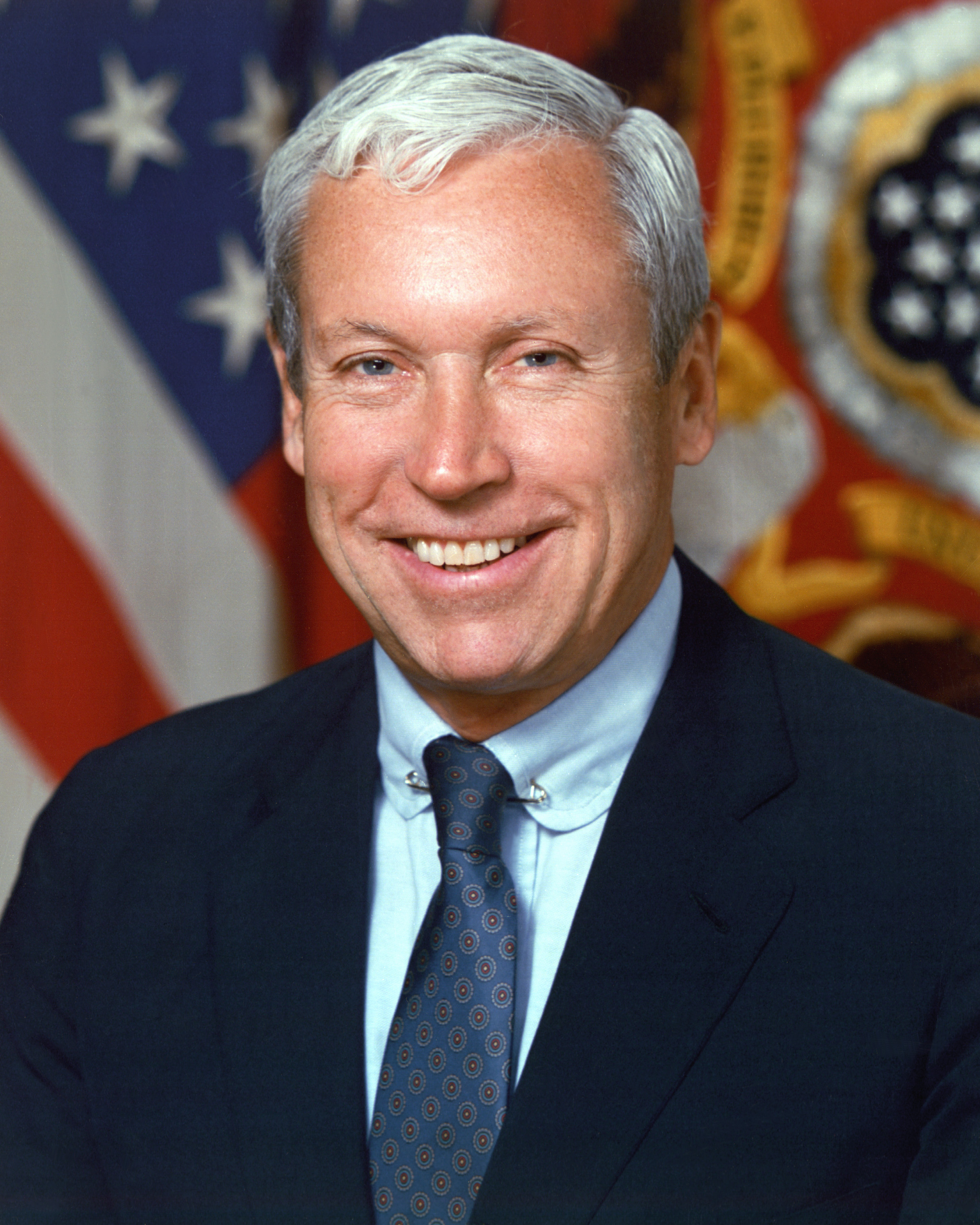
Michael P. W. Stone

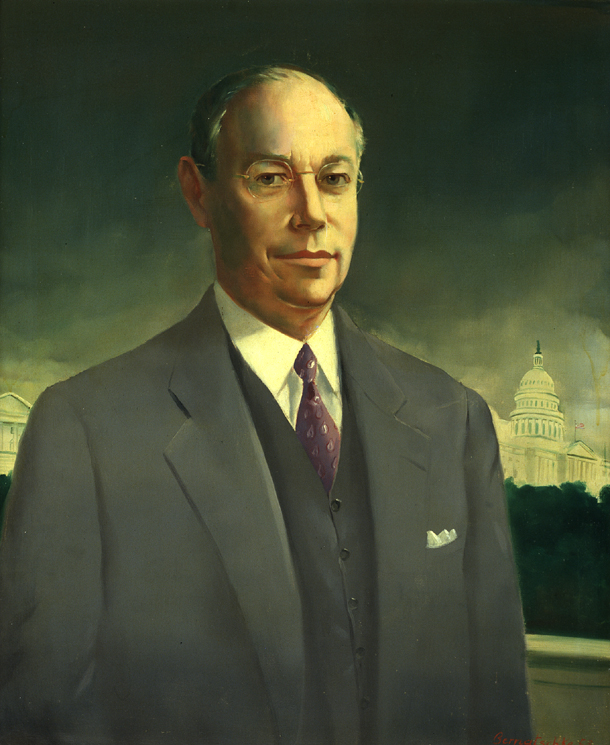
Robert A. Taft

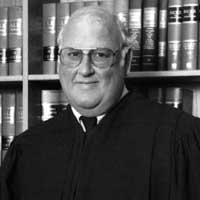
Ralph K. Winter Jr.

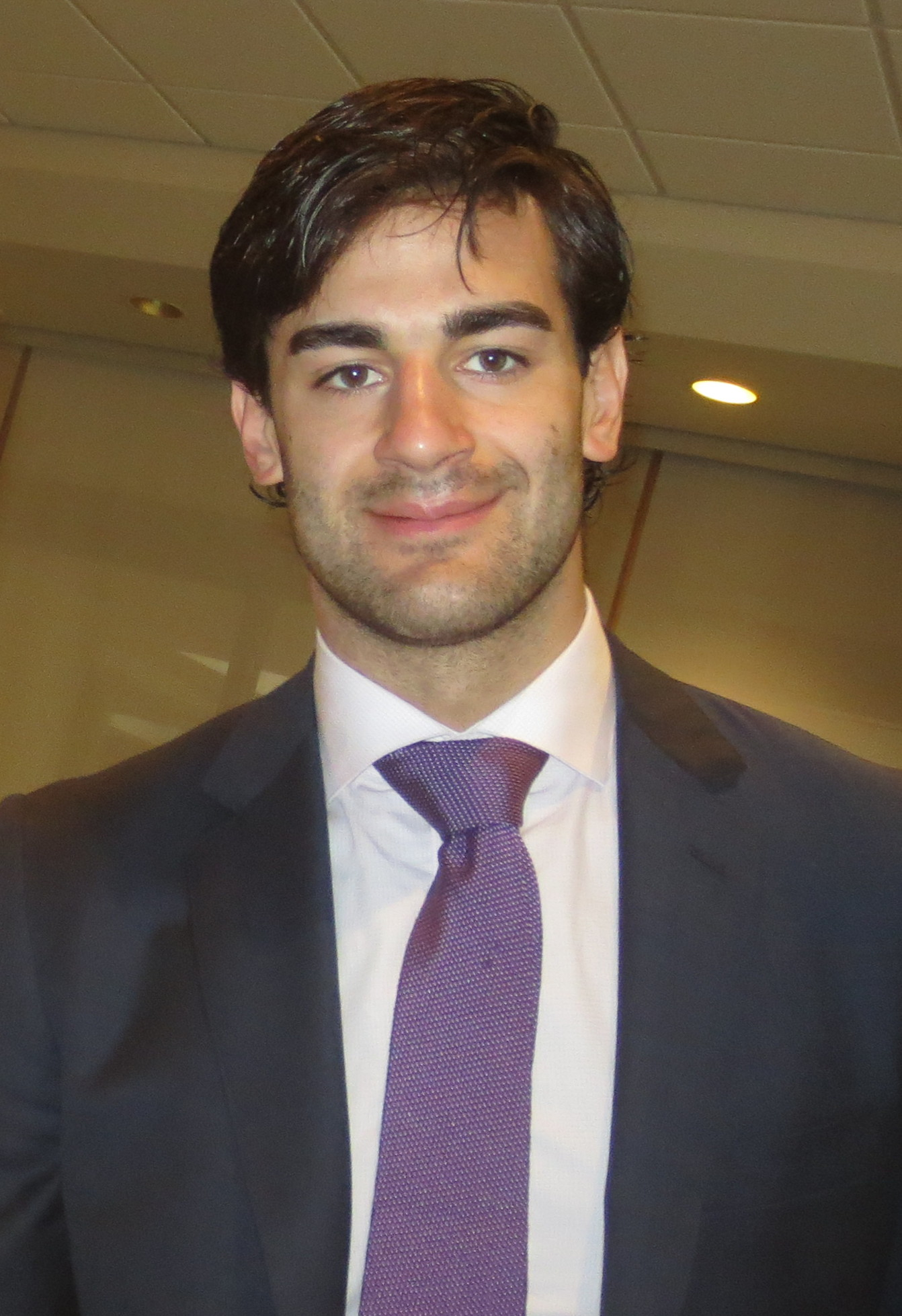
Max Pacioretty

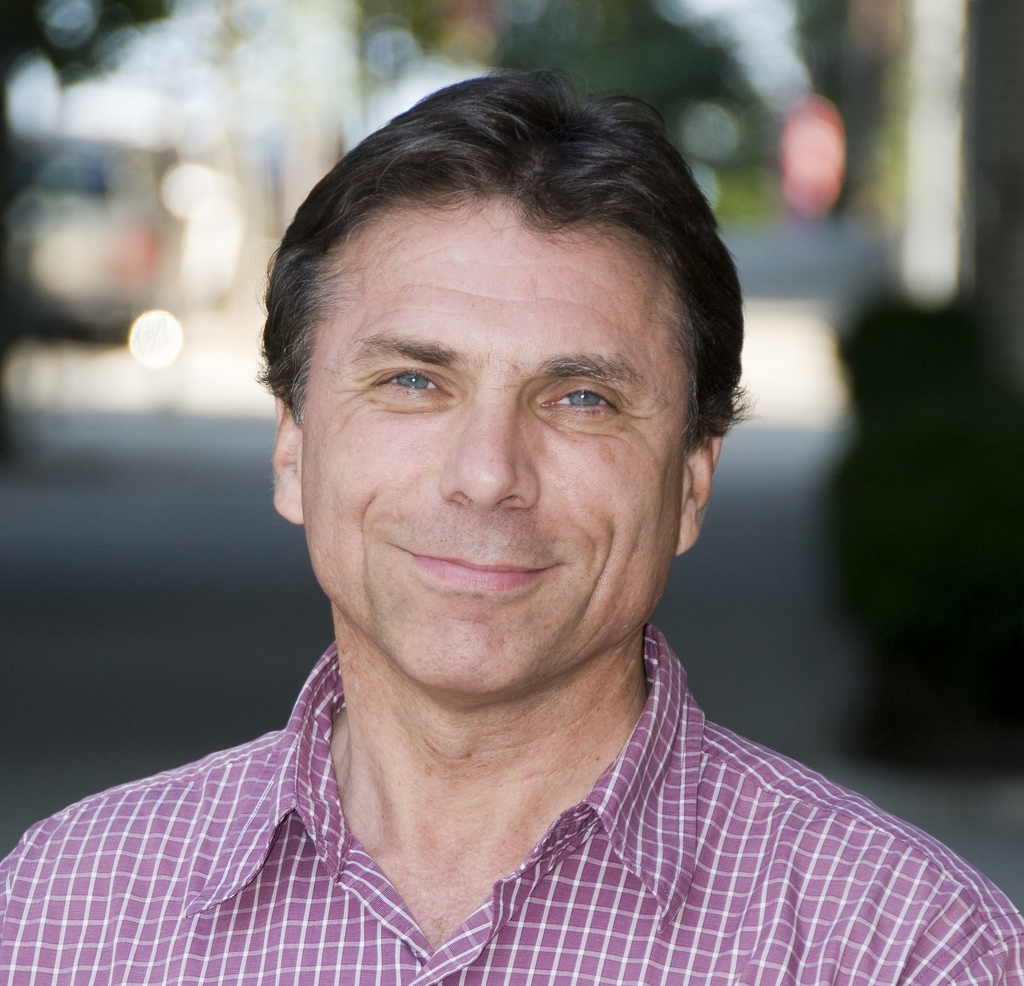
Nelson Antonio Denis

- T. H. Breen '60, Guggenheim fellow, history professor
- Stevan Dedijer '30, founder of the Research Policy Institute, pioneer of business intelligence
- Alfred G. Gilman '58, Nobel laureate in Physiology or Medicine
- Mason Gross '29, president of Rutgers University
- Thomas Kuhn '40, philosopher of science, author
- Samuel T. Orton 1897, pioneer in the study of dyslexia
- Rollin G. Osterweis '26, professor of history at Yale University

== Arts and entertainment ==
- Trey Anastasio '83, Phish lead guitarist
- Jeff Baxter '67, musician (Steely Dan, Doobie Brothers)
- Henry Beard '63, co-founder of National Lampoon, co-author of Bored of the Rings
- Peter Berg '80, actor/director of Friday Night Lights, Lone Survivor
- Jason Blum '87, producer of Get Out and Paranormal Activity, founder of Blumhouse Productions
- Mia Borders, '05, singer-songwriter
- Mary Chapin Carpenter '76, five-time Grammy Award winner
- Spencer Treat Clark '05, actor in Gladiator, Mystic River, Unbreakable, and The Last House on the Left
- Barnaby Conrad '40, author, artist, bullfighter
- Barnaby Conrad III '71, author and artist
- Dominique Dunne, actress
- Adam Duritz '82, lead singer of Counting Crows
- James Franciscus '53, actor in The Naked City, Longstreet
- Grant Goodeve, actor in Eight is Enough
- Geoffrey T. Hellman '24, longtime New Yorker columnist
- Deane G. Keller '17, painter and educator
- Alan Klingenstein '72, film producer, distributor, and entertainment executive. Credits include Two Family House, winner of the Audience Award at the Sundance Film Festival
- Ralph Lee '53, Guggenheim fellow and Obie Award winner
- Lorenzo Mariani '73, international opera director
- Steve Sandvoss '98, actor
- Tom Santopietro '72, author and Broadway theater manager
- Fred Small '70, singer-songwriter
- Dudley Taft '84, member of Sweet Water guitars, vocals
- Karen L. Thorson '78, producer of The Wire, The Unusuals

== Business ==
- Henry Becton, chairman of Becton Dickinson and Company
- Thomas Ludlow Chrystie II '51, investment banker, first CFO of Merrill and inventor of the Cash Management Account
- Peter S. Kaufman '71, investment banker, president of the Gordian Group LLC
- Joseph Irwin Miller '27, industrialist, Cummins Engine Company
- John M. Schiff '21, investment banker, philanthropist, honorary chairman of Lehman Brothers
- John G. Taft '68, financier and writer
- James B. Taylor '40, business jet marketing pioneer
- George Weyerhaeuser '44, chairman and CEO, Weyerhaeuser Company

== Government officials ==
- William D. Brewer, U.S. ambassador
- Nathaniel Neiman Craley, Jr. '46, U.S. congressman from Pennsylvania
- Richard Funkhouser, U.S. ambassador to Gabon
- Robert C. Hill '38, U.S. ambassador to Costa Rica, El Salvador, Mexico, Spain and Argentina
- William S. Mailliard '35, U.S. congressman, California
- Manuel Rocha '69, U.S. ambassador to Bolivia 2000–02
- Earl E. T. Smith '22, U.S. ambassador to Cuba (1958–59)
- Michael P. W. Stone '42, U.S. secretary of the Army
- Bob Taft '59, governor of Ohio
- Robert Taft, Jr. '35, Republican congressman 1963–65, 1967–71, senator 1971–76
- Robert A. Taft 1906, U.S. senator from Ohio 1939–53, majority leader
- William Howard Taft III '33, U.S. ambassador to Ireland
- Robert F. Wagner Jr. '29, mayor of New York
- John S. Wold '34, U.S. congressman, Wyoming

== Legal and judiciary ==
- Flemming L. Norcott, Jr. '61, associate justice of the Connecticut Supreme Court
- Robert W. Sweet '40, federal judge who heard New York Times v. Gonzales concerning the Judith Miller controversy
- Wesley S. Williams Jr. '59, first African-American to serve both as legal counsel to the United States Senate and president of the Harvard Law School Association
- Ralph K. Winter Jr. '53, federal judge for the United States Court of Appeals for the Second Circuit, nominated to the court in 1981 by President Ronald Reagan

== Sports ==
- Skyler Bell '21, professional football player
- Amanda Boulier '11, professional hockey player of Professional Women's Hockey League the Montreal Victoire
- Darren Bragg '87, professional baseball player
- James Driscoll '96, professional golfer
- Patrick Kerney '95, professional football player
- Allison Mleczko '93, gold medalist in first women's Olympic ice hockey game at Nagano; silver medalist in 2002
- Max Pacioretty '07, professional hockey player for the Carolina Hurricanes
- Barbara Potter '79, Hall of Fame professional tennis player
- James Stillman Rockefeller 1920, Olympic gold medalist, 8-man rowing (Paris, France)
- Ryan Shannon '01, professional hockey player
- Tammy Lee Shewchuk '96, Olympic gold medalist in women's ice hockey, Salt Lake City
- Jaime Sifers '02, professional ice hockey player
- Katey Stone '84, head coach of 2014 Olympic women's ice hockey team, coach of Harvard Crimson women's ice hockey team
- John Welchli '46, Olympic silver medalist, Melbourne, 1956

== Writing, journalism, and publishing ==
- Laurence Bergreen '67, historian and biographer
- Nelson Denis '72, journalist, screenwriter, former New York State assemblyman
- Steven J. Erlanger ’70, London bureau chief (formerly Paris and Jerusalem bureau chief) for The New York Times
- Philip K. Howard '66, founder of Common Good, author of The Death of Common Sense: How Law is Suffocating America
- Thomas Kuhn '40, author of Structure of Scientific Revolutions, coined the phrase "paradigm shift"
- John Merrow ’59, Peabody Award-winning journalist and producer
- Sumner Chilton Powell '42, Pulitzer Prize winner in history for Puritan Village: The Formation of a New England Town
- Josh Quittner '75, author, editor of Business 2.0
- David Kenyon Webster '40, soldier, journalist, and author
