= John Taft =

John Taft may refer to:

- John Taft (ice hockey), American ice hockey player
- John B. Taft, American farmer and politician
- John G. Taft, American financier and writer
- John Taft (basketball), American basketball player
