= Holy See–Yugoslavia relations =

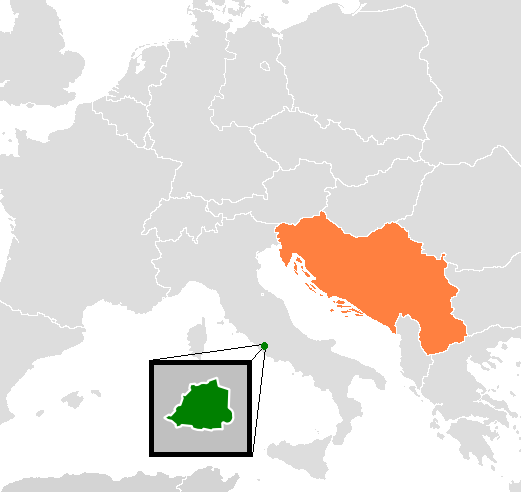

- Holy See: Yugoslavia

Holy See–Yugoslavia relations were historical bilateral relations between the Holy See and now split-up Yugoslavia (both the Kingdom of Yugoslavia and Socialist Federal Republic of Yugoslavia). The Socialist Federal Republic of Yugoslavia was the only Eastern European socialist state with which the Holy See had official diplomatic relations. Despite disagreements on the internal Yugoslav issues, (which led to temporary cessation of relations in 1952) close relations were set in the context of international close understanding on their respective Global South policies and confrontation of the enormous challenges of developing countries.

== History ==
=== Kingdom of Yugoslavia ===
Before the creation of Yugoslavia the Holy See signed its concordat with the Kingdom of Serbia in 1914, just before the beginning of the World War I. Regular diplomatic relations between the Holy See and the Kingdom of Serbs, Croats and Slovenes were established in 1920. At the time of 1921 census 39% of Yugoslav citizens declared themselves as Roman Catholic, which was the second biggest denomination just behind Eastern Orthodox 48%. The new kingdom intended to sign a new concordat with Vatican with the support of ethnic Croat leadership. Nevertheless, Stjepan Radić opposed the idea as he accused the pope of support for Italian irredentism and advocated the idea of an independent Croatian Catholic Church. After the assassination of king Alexander I of Yugoslavia in France in 1934, Yugoslavia and the Holy See signed the new concordat in 1935. The Serbian Orthodox Church accused the state of granting privileges to Roman Catholics which were not enjoyed by any other denomination. The Orthodox Church therefore initiated activities to pressure withdrawal from the agreement in which it warned Orthodox members of the Parliament of Yugoslavia to vote against the concordat. Serbian Patriarch Varnava died on the day of the ratification of concordat in 1937 which led to further political crisis and Yugoslav withdrawal from the agreement later that year.

=== World War II and the immediate post-war years ===
Catholic clergy involvement with the Ustaše in the Independent State of Croatia (NDH), a Nazi puppet state created on the territory of Axis-occupied Yugoslavia caused significant controversy and led to post-war retaliations. New authorities prohibited teaching of catechism in state schools, expropriated large church property and outlawed some religious press which was perceived as violation of religious freedoms. Vatican condemned Yugoslav policies and particularly Yugoslav handling of the Aloysius Stepinac case. When in 1952 Aloysius Stepinac was declared cardinal of the Roman Catholic Archdiocese of Zagreb Yugoslavia decided to cancel its relations with the Holy See.

=== Socialist Federal Republic of Yugoslavia ===
In 1967 Yugoslavia normalized its relations with the Holy See and Pope Paul VI together with President of Yugoslavia Josip Broz Tito worked together to achieve peace in Vietnam. In contrast to other socialist states of the time, Catholic Church maintained an active role in society of Yugoslavia. In March 1971, president Tito visited the Holy See and Pope Paul VI, thus becoming the first leader of a socialist republic to come to the Holy See on official visit. Vatican daily L'Osservatore Romano addressed words of welcome to the President on its front page with the words "Greetings President Tito". According to the Croatian diplomat and Vatican analyst Vjekoslav Cvrlje who served as a first Ambassador of Yugoslavia to the Holy See, President Tito was given special attention by the Pope. When Tito arrived at the Ciampino Airport he was greeted by Cardinal Giovanni Benelli and many other senior Vatican officials.

In 1977 Pope Paul VI, referring to Yugoslav role in the Non-Aligned Movement, expressed his appreciation of Yugoslavia’s activity in pursuit of better cooperation between nations, particularly in questions concerning peace, disarmament, and the support due to developing countries. Secretary of the Council for Public Affairs of the Church Achille Silvestrini led the Holy See delegation at the state funeral of Josip Broz Tito in 1980.

=== Breakup of Yugoslavia ===
The Holy See, led by Pope John Paul II, played a prominent role in the process which led to recognition of independence of the Yugoslav constituent Republic of Croatia and Slovenia and it granted its formal recognition on 13 January 1992 (intent already announced on December 20, 1991), two days before the recognition by the member states of the European Economic Community.

== See also ==
- The Yugoslav Auschwitz and the Vatican
- Josip Juraj Strossmayer (founder of the Yugoslav Academy of Sciences and Arts)
- Vinko Pribojević
- Juraj Križanić
- Franjo Rački
- Bosnia and Herzegovina–Holy See relations
- Croatia–Holy See relations
- Holy See–North Macedonia relations
- Holy See–Serbia relations
