= Vladimir Dedijer =

Serbian politician and partisan fighter (1914–1990)

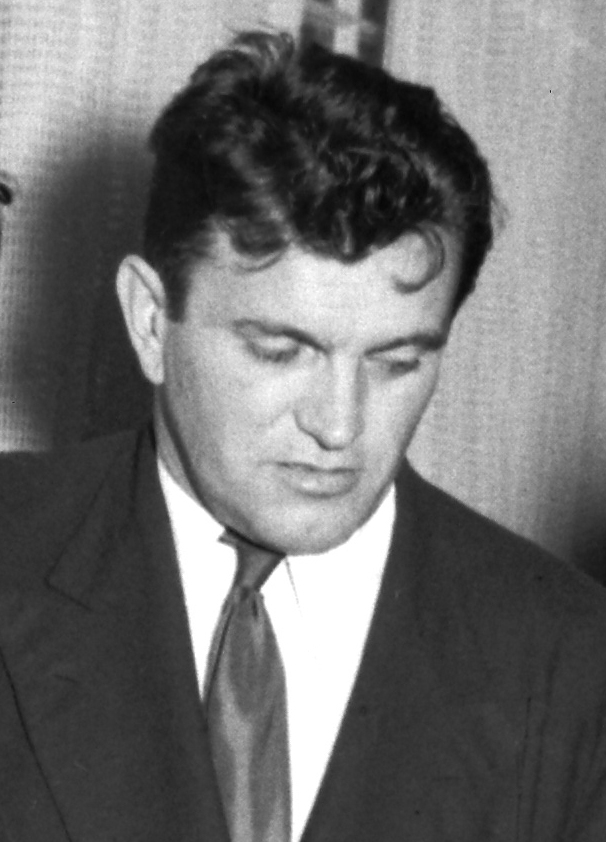
- Dedijer in 1960
- Born: 4 February 1914; Belgrade, Kingdom of Serbia
- Died: 30 November 1990 (aged 76); Boston, Massachusetts, U.S.
- Works: Novi prilozi za biografiju Josipa Broza Tita; The Yugoslav Auschwitz and the Vatican
- Awards: Commemorative Medal of the Partisans of 1941; Order of the Partisan Star

Vladimir Dedijer (Serbian Cyrillic: Владимир Дедијер; 4 February 1914 – 30 November 1990) was a Yugoslav partisan fighter during World War II who became known as a politician, human rights activist, and historian. In the early postwar years, he represented Yugoslavia at the United Nations and was a senior government official.

Later, after being at cross purposes with the government, he concentrated on his academic career as a historian. He taught at the University of Belgrade and also served as a visiting professor at several universities in the United States and Europe. He participated in the Russell Tribunal in 1967, reviewing United States forces activities in Vietnam, and in later tribunals.

== Origins and family ==
Vladimir Dedijer was born to a Serbian family in Belgrade, in the Kingdom of Serbia, which later was absorbed into Yugoslavia. His family originated from Čepelica, Bileća in Bosnia and Herzegovina and were Orthodox Christians. His father, Jevto Dedijer, was a professor of geography at Belgrade University and his mother, Milica, was a social worker. He was the middle of three sons: Borivoje, Vladimir, and Stevan.

Before World War II, Dedijer married Olga Popović. Their daughter, Milica, was named for his mother. After Olga died in 1943, her widower married again the next year to Vera Križman, an actress and fellow Yugoslav Partisan. He and Vera had four children together: daughter Bojana and three sons, Borivoje (Boro), Branimir (Branko), and Marko Dedijer. Branko committed suicide at 13, after being interrogated by police about his father's political activities. After he returned home, he hanged himself. Boro committed suicide in 1966 by jumping off a cliff near his father's house. But Dedijer believed that Boro was killed by Slovenian police.

== Political and revolutionary activity ==
In his youth Dedijer attended the Conference for Reconciliation in Poland in 1929 as a delegate of Yugoslav high school youth. In 1931, he attended the XX World Congress of the Young Men's Christian Association in Cleveland, Ohio in the United States.

After finishing high school, Dedijer worked for the daily newspaper Politika while studying law. As a journalist, he became a foreign correspondent in Poland, Denmark, Norway (1935), England (1935–1936), and Spain (1936) in the years before the outbreak of World War II. For his support of the Republican government in Spain during the Spanish Civil War, Dedijer was fired from Politika in 1937 by order of the Yugoslav government.

During the 1930s, Dedijer collaborated with the Communist Party of Yugoslavia (CPY). Dedijer considered himself an independent thinker like Serbian ancestors. "It is hard to be a Serb," he said once, "But how beautiful!"

Dedijer joined Yugoslav partisans in 1941 in their struggle against the Nazi Germany occupiers. He served as Lieutenant Colonel in Tito's headquarters. During the war he was a political commissar.

His wife, Olga, a medical student who had become a partisan surgeon, was killed during the battle of Sutjeska in Bosnia in 1943. He was wounded then and on two later occasions. The day after Olga's funeral, Dedijer was seriously injured. Tito partisans promoted him to colonel and sent him to recover in Cairo, Egypt and Naples, Italy. In 1944 Dedijer returned to Tito's Adriatic base Vis.

After the war, Dedijer served as a member of the Yugoslav delegation on 1946 Paris peace conference and in several sessions of United Nations General Assembly (1945–1952). He also became a history professor at the University of Belgrade.

In 1952, Dedijer became a member of the Party's Central Committee. The following year he was appointed to the Federal Assembly. He was the sole member of the Central Committee to side in 1954 with Milovan Djilas when Djilas was deposed by Tito for criticizing a "New Class" of party bureaucrats and advocating the rule of law in socialism. Dedijer defended Djilas's right to freedom of expression before the Central Committee of the CPY in January 1954. In response, Dedijer was expelled from the CPY, removed from his political offices, and dismissed from his teaching position in the History Department at the University of Belgrade. Djilas was jailed and Dedijer received a suspended prison sentence of six months.

== University career ==
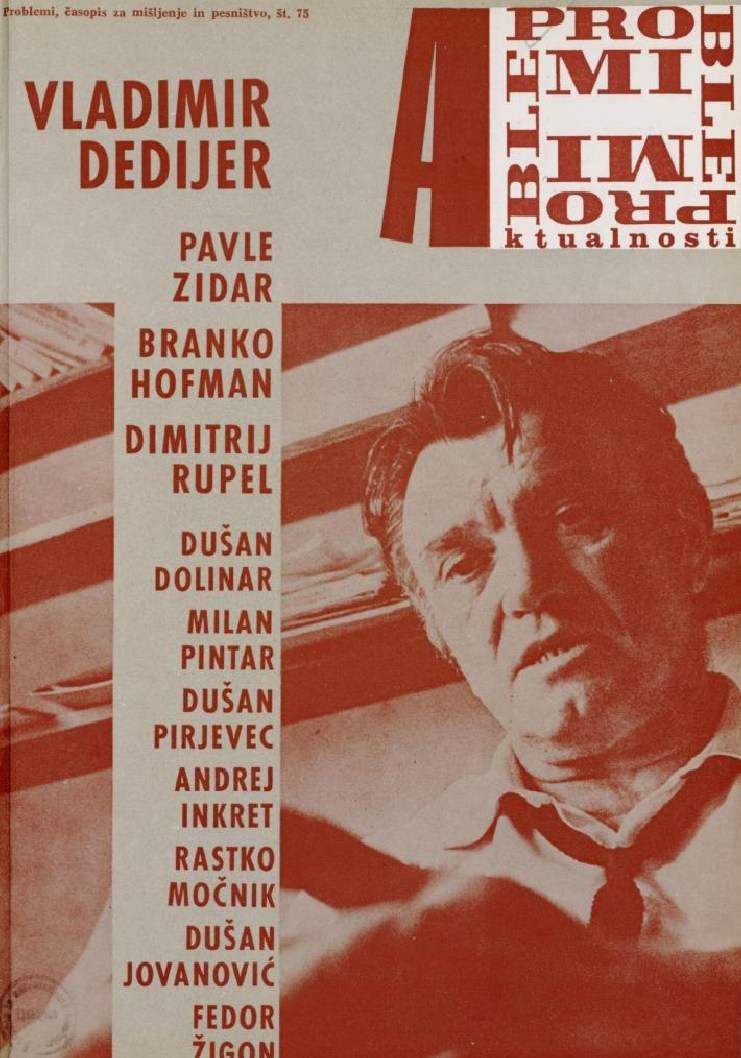
Vladimir Dedijer on the 1969 cover of the Problemi magazine published in Ljubljana.

Granted a passport by Yugoslav authorities in 1959, Dedijer was allowed to leave the country with his family. From then on, he devoted himself to writing history and teaching. He taught at University of Belgrade and served as visiting professor of history at universities in the United States: Michigan, Harvard, Stanford, Princeton, and Yale; and in Europe: Paris (Sorbonne), Manchester (England), and Stockholm, Sweden.

In 1978, he was admitted as a full member to the Serbian Academy of Sciences and Arts.

Dedijer is known for his book, The Yugoslav Auschwitz and the Vatican: The Croatian Massacre of the Serbs During World War II, which was translated into several languages. He wrote about the violent repression and genocide committed by Ustashe Catholics in Croatia against ethnicities and religions that they considered heretics. He estimated a total of 750,000 Orthodox Serbs; 60,000 Jews; and 26,000 Sinti and Roma were massacred by the Ustashe.

The preface of the 1992 book edition reads,

»...in Catholic Croatia, the 'Kingdom of God', everyone who did not belong to the Catholic faith - for the most part Orthodox Serbs - was compelled to convert to Catholicism. Those who refused - as well as many who had already converted - were murdered, usually after prolonged torture in which the order of the day was the cutting off of noses, ears, or other body parts, or poking out eyes. Children were cut out of the bodies of pregnant women and subsequently beheaded; people were chopped to pieces before the eyes of loved ones, who were even forced to catch the spurting blood in a bowl, etc., to list only a few horrors as examples. These atrocities assumed such an extent that even German Nazis, who were not exactly sensitive in such matters, protested. If this historical fact is little known where we are, another fact completely escapes our knowledge: the decisive involvement of the Vatican in these massacres.«

His history, The Road to Sarajevo (1966), discusses the origins of World War I. His book Tito (1953), was translated into twenty languages. Dedijer donated all his income from that book ($530,000) to charities. Dedijer wrote two important accounts of Yugoslav Partisan history: Diary and Tito, both of which have been published in English.

== Human rights activity, later life and death ==
Dedijer was considered a leading authority on genocide in the twentieth century. Together with French philosopher and activist Jean-Paul Sartre, he chaired the Bertrand Russell International Tribunal on War Crimes, organized in 1966, in the role of the first vice-president.

The First International Russell Tribunal was set up in 1966 to adjudicate the war crimes committed by the US in Vietnam and conducted hearings in 1967. The Tribunal was due to sit in Paris, but the French authorities refused to grant an entry visa to Dedijer. For that reason, the Tribunal held its first session in Stockholm, Sweden (2-10 May 1967) and the second session in Roskilde, Denmark (20 November-1 December 1967). Both sessions were presided by Dedijer. The sessions condemned the US for war crimes, aggression, and genocide in the Vietnam War.

Dedijer presided over the Third International Russell Tribunal, which was constituted in Darmstadt and held on 16 October 1977. The Tribunal dealt with the denial of the right of individuals to practice their chosen profession in West Germany because of their political convictions, after the government had issued a discriminatory decree against radicals at a time of great social unrest in the nation. legislature had passed laws against in West Germany.

Soon after Tito's death, Dedijer published a three-volume work titled Novi prilozi za biografiju Josipa Broza Tita ("New Contributions to the Biography of Josip Broz Tito") in 1980-1984. This book marked Dedijer's change of opinion towards Tito. The book was full of unverified claims and unreliable rumours presented as historical facts. Historian Ivo Banac called the New Contributions "an ungrateful book, improvised cabbage salad, full of unrelated provocations". Most historians regarded this book as a pamphlet in which no rules of historical science were followed. The book was a bestseller, very popular among the historical revisionists who wanted to paint negative light on the life and work of Tito. In 1982, Dedijer accused some of the leading Yugoslav politicians for organizing a smear campaigned against him and his book. Dedijer claimed that Vladimir Bakarić was the main organizer of this campaign and said he intends to sue Bakarić, Kosta Nađ and Ivica Račan for that reason.

Dedijer died in Boston, Massachusetts on 30 November 1990. He was subsequently cremated. His ashes were returned for interment at Žale Central Cemetery in Ljubljana, Slovenia.

== Dedijer's bibliography ==
- Jugoslovansko-albanski odnosi, 1939-1948, Borba, Ljubljana, 1949 (in Slovenian)
- Tito speaks: his self-portrait and struggle with Stalin, London : Weidenfeld and Nicolson, 1953.
- On military conventions; an essay on the evolution of international law, Lund, Gleerup 1961
- The Beloved Land, MacGibbon & Kee, 1961
- Tito, Simon and Schuster, 1963
- The Road to Sarajevo, Simon and Schuster, 1966 - World War, 1914-1918
- History of Yugoslavia, McGraw-Hill Book Co., 1974
- The Battle Stalin Lost: Memoirs of Yugoslavia 1948-1953, Viking Press, Jan 1, 1971
- (Serbian) Novi prilozi za biografiju Josipa Broza Tita, Mladost, Zagreb 1980
- (Serbian) Interesne sfere: istorija interesnih sfera i tajne diplomatije uopšte, a posebno Jugoslavije u drugom svetskom ratu, Prosveta, Beograd 1980
- (Serbian) Vatikan i Jasenovac, Rad Beograd 1987
- (Serbian) Vatikan i Jasenovac Dokumenti, Rad Beograd 1987
- (Bosnian) Genocid nad Muslimanima, Svjetlost, Sarajevo 1990
- The War Diaries of Vladimir Dedijer, Volume 1: From April 6, 1941, to November 27, 1942, University of Michigan Press, Ann Arbor, 1990
- The War Diaries of Vladimir Dedijer, Volume 2: From November 28, 1942, to September 10, 1943, University of Michigan Press, Ann Arbor, May 1, 1990
- The War Diaries of Vladimir Dedijer, Volume 3:From September 11, 1943, to November 7, 1944, University of Michigan Press, Ann Arbor, Sep 1, 1990
- The Yugoslav Auschwitz and the Vatican: the Croatian Massacre of the Serbs during World War II, Buffalo, N.Y. : Prometheus Books; Freiburg, Germany : Ahriman-Verlag, 1992.
