= Jevto Dedijer =

Jevto Dedijer (Serbian Cyrillic: Јевто Дедијер; 15 August 1880 – 24 December 1918) was a Serb writer and geographer who was influential in the formation of the Serb Academy.

He was born to a peasant family of the Maleševci clan in the village of Čepelica near Bileća, during the Austro-Hungarian rule in Bosnia and Herzegovina. He attended the Mostar Gymnasium and studied at the Belgrade Higher School. He received a doctorate at the University of Vienna in 1907.

He was employed at the National Museum in Sarajevo until the 1908 Bosnian Crisis. He then became professor at the School of Theology in Belgrade and in 1910 an assistant professor of geography at the University of Belgrade.

During World War I, he immigrated to France and then to Switzerland. After the war, he moved to the State of Serbs, Croats and Slovenes, which later became the Kingdom of Serbs, Croats and Slovenes. He died on 24 December 1918 in Sarajevo from the Spanish flu aged only 38.

He had three sons: Vladimir, who served as a Yugoslav partisan in World War II and became a biographer of Josip Broz Tito; Boro; and Stevan, a pioneer of business intelligence who also served in World War II but in the United States Army with the 101st Airborne Division.

== See also ==
- Vladimir Dedijer
- Stevan Dedijer
