= Holy See–North Macedonia relations =

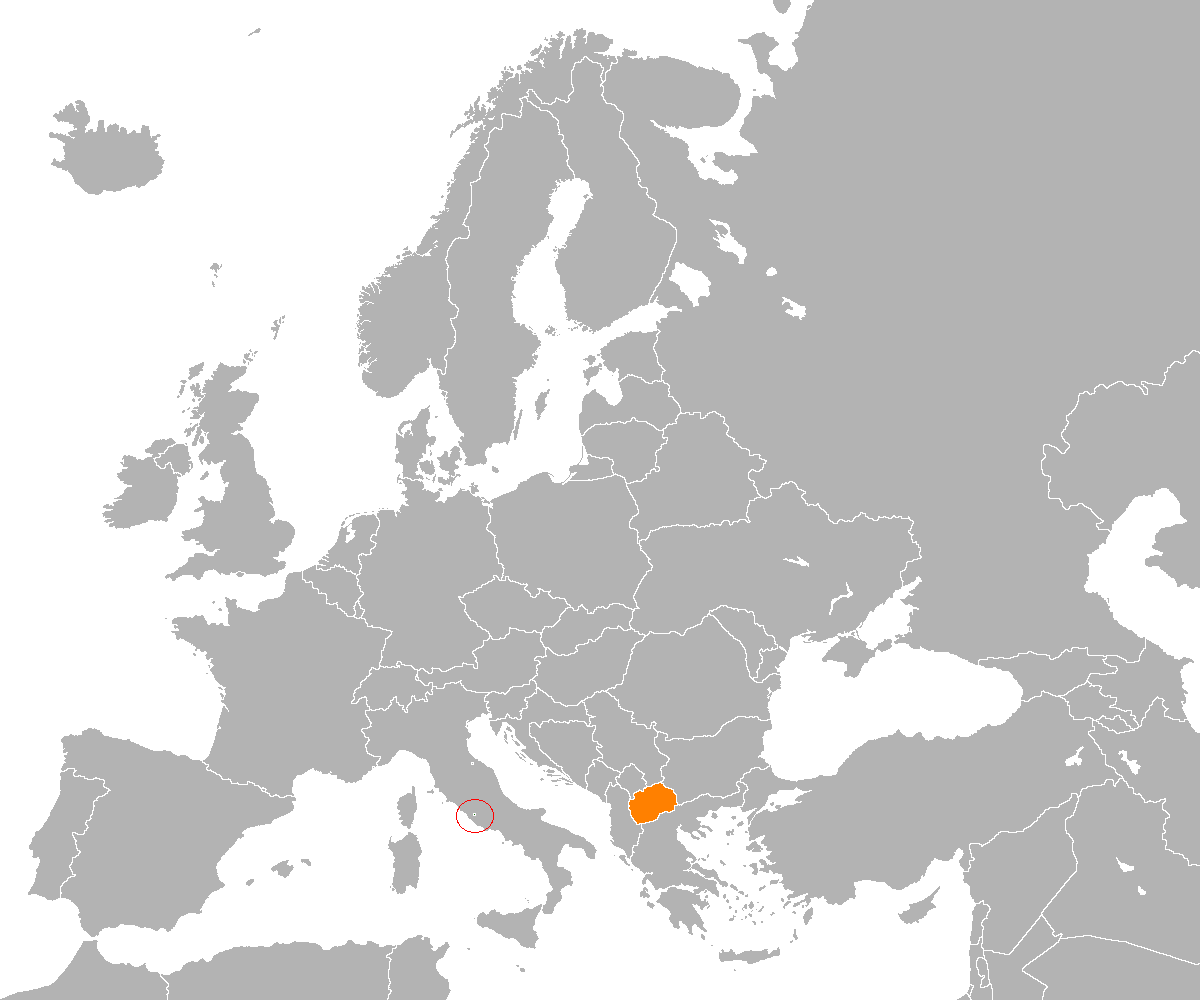

- Holy See: North Macedonia

Holy See–North Macedonia relations refer to the bilateral political relations between the Holy See and the Republic of North Macedonia.

The Holy See and North Macedonia enjoy excellent relations, based on friendship, mutual support and understanding.

== Relations ==
The Republic of North Macedonia became an independent country in 1991, when it declared itself independent from the Socialist Federal Republic of Yugoslavia. The Holy See was among the countries which supported the country's independence and sovereignty from the very start.

Full diplomatic relations between the Holy See and North Macedonia were established on 21 December 1994. However, the Holy See was not among the 131 states which recognized the country under its former constitutional name, but established relations under the country's UN reference "the former Yugoslav Republic of Macedonia".

North Macedonia gets continuous support from the Holy See, especially when it gets to North Macedonia's aspirations to join the European Union.

North Macedonia's leadership for almost fifty years annually visits the pope in the Vatican City.

== Diplomatic representations ==
Until 2002, the embassy of North Macedonia in Slovenia was accredited to the Holy See. Since 2002, North Macedonia maintains an embassy for the Holy See in Rome. The Holy See has an apostolic nunciature to Slovenia in Ljubljana, which is also responsible for North Macedonia.

== Relations with the Macedonian Orthodox Church – Ohrid Archbishopric ==
The relations between the Roman Catholic Church and the Macedonian Orthodox Church – Ohrid Archbishopric (MOC-OA) are characterized as good. The Holy See has often and in a variety of ways helped the functioning of the Orthodox Church in North Macedonia.

== See also ==
- Foreign relations of the Holy See
- Foreign relations of North Macedonia
- Roman Catholicism in North Macedonia
- Holy See–Yugoslavia relations
