= Holy See–Serbia relations =

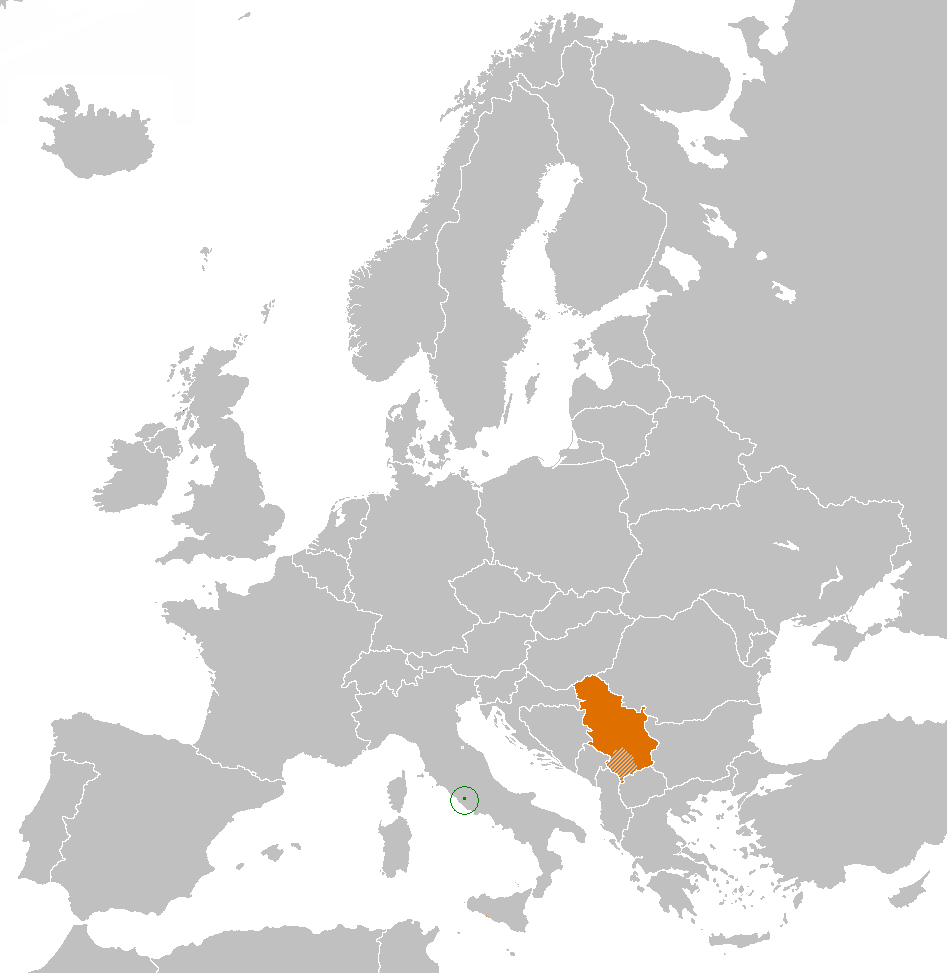
- Holy See: Serbia

Diplomatic mission
- Apostolic Nunciature to Serbia: Serbian Embassy to the Holy See

Holy See and Serbia maintain diplomatic relations established between the Holy See and Kingdom of Yugoslavia in 1919. From 1919 to 2006, the Holy See maintained relations with the Kingdom of Yugoslavia, the Socialist Federal Republic of Yugoslavia (SFRY), and the Federal Republic of Yugoslavia (FRY) (later Serbia and Montenegro), of which Serbia is considered shared (SFRY) or sole (FRY) legal successor.

== History ==
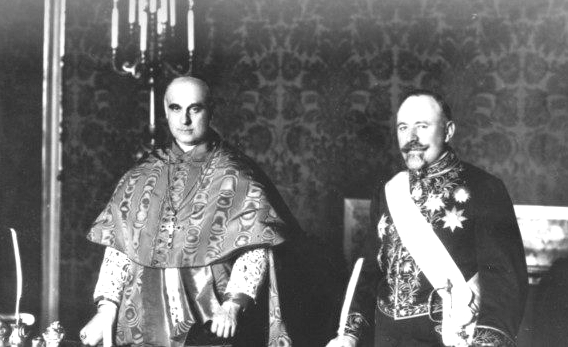
Rafael Merry del Val with Milenko Vesnić signing Serbian concordat during the pontificate of Pius X

The baptism of Grand Prince of Serbia Stefan Nemanja was latin rite catholic, in the Serbian Medieval State of Duklja.

The coronation of Grand Prince of Serbia Stefan the First-Crowned (1165–1228) was performed by a legate of Pope Urban II, which led some Serbian historians to conclude that Stefan converted to Catholicism.

Stefan's third wife, Venetian noblewoman Anna Dandolo, a Catholic, became Queen of Serbia and was mother to Stefan Uroš I. Popular legend claims that the Žiča Monastery, seat of the Serbian Orthodox Church between 1219–1253, was intentionally constructed on the halfway between Rome and Constantinople.

== Vatican's stance on Kosovo ==
The Holy See has decided to not recognize Kosovo (Note: Kosovo is the subject of a territorial dispute between the Republic of Serbia and Republic of Kosovo.) as a country but integral part of Serbia under UN 1244. This was part of an ecumenical agreement with Russia, Russian Orthodox Church and Serbian Orthodox Church, and this has led to a warming of Vatican-Serbia relations.

== Resident diplomatic missions ==
- The Holy See has an embassy in Belgrade.
- Serbia has an embassy to the Holy See in Rome (Italy).

== See also ==
- Foreign relations of the Holy See
- Foreign relations of Serbia
- Holy See–Yugoslavia relations
- Catholic clergy involvement with the Ustaše
