= Croatia–Holy See relations =

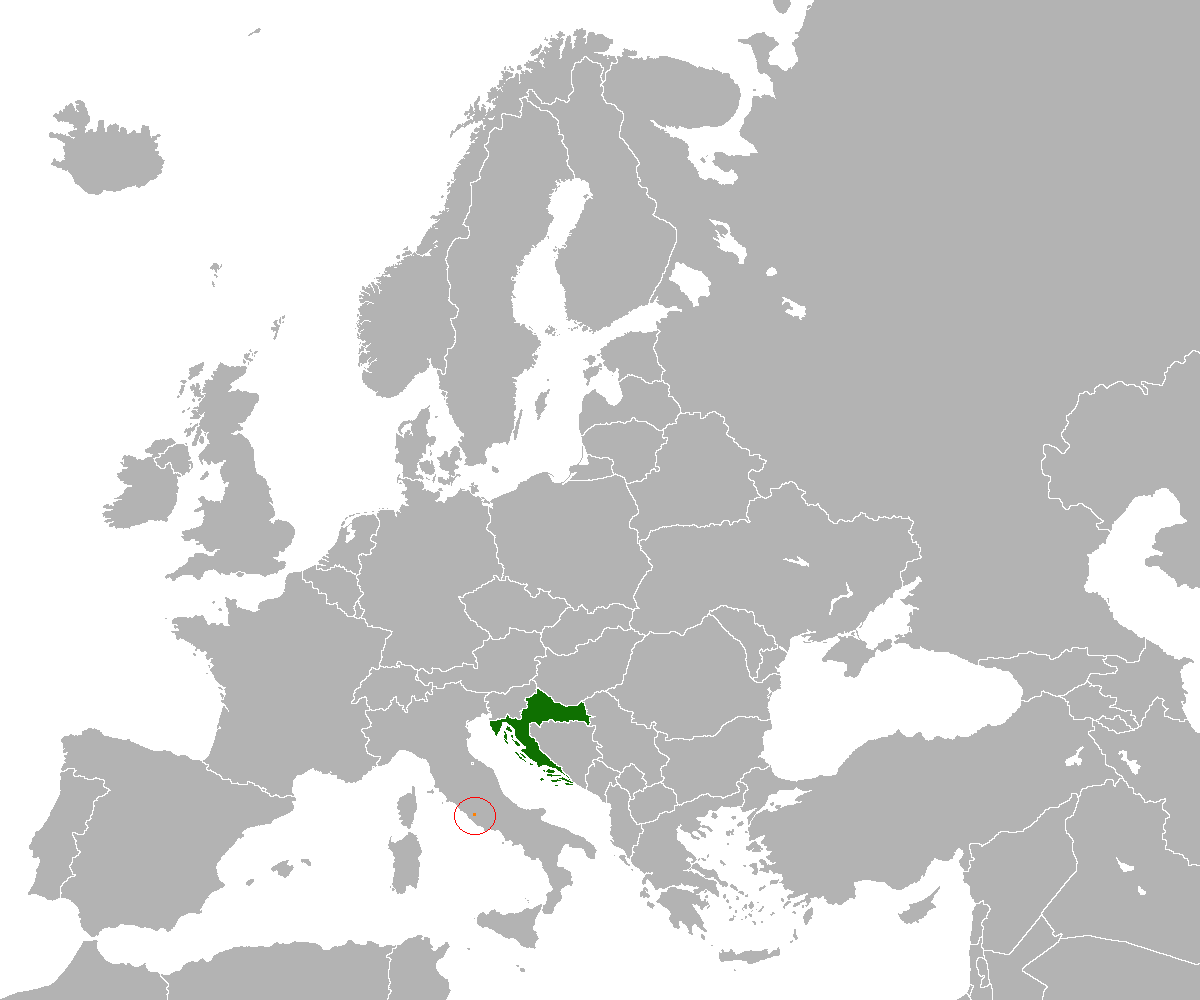

- Croatia: Holy See

Diplomatic mission
- Croatian embassy in Rome: Holy See nunciature in Zagreb

Envoy
- Neven Pelicarić: Giuseppe Pinto

Croatia–Holy See relations refer to the bilateral relationship between Croatia and the Holy See. Diplomatic relations among the two countries were established on February 8, 1992, following Croatia's independence from SFR Yugoslavia, although they date far back in history.

According to 86.28% of Croatia's 4.5 million people declared themselves Roman Catholics.

Pope Pius VII (1800) were the first two popes to visit Croatian territories, while Pope John Paul II was the first pope to visit the Republic of Croatia (1994).

== History ==
=== Early ages ===
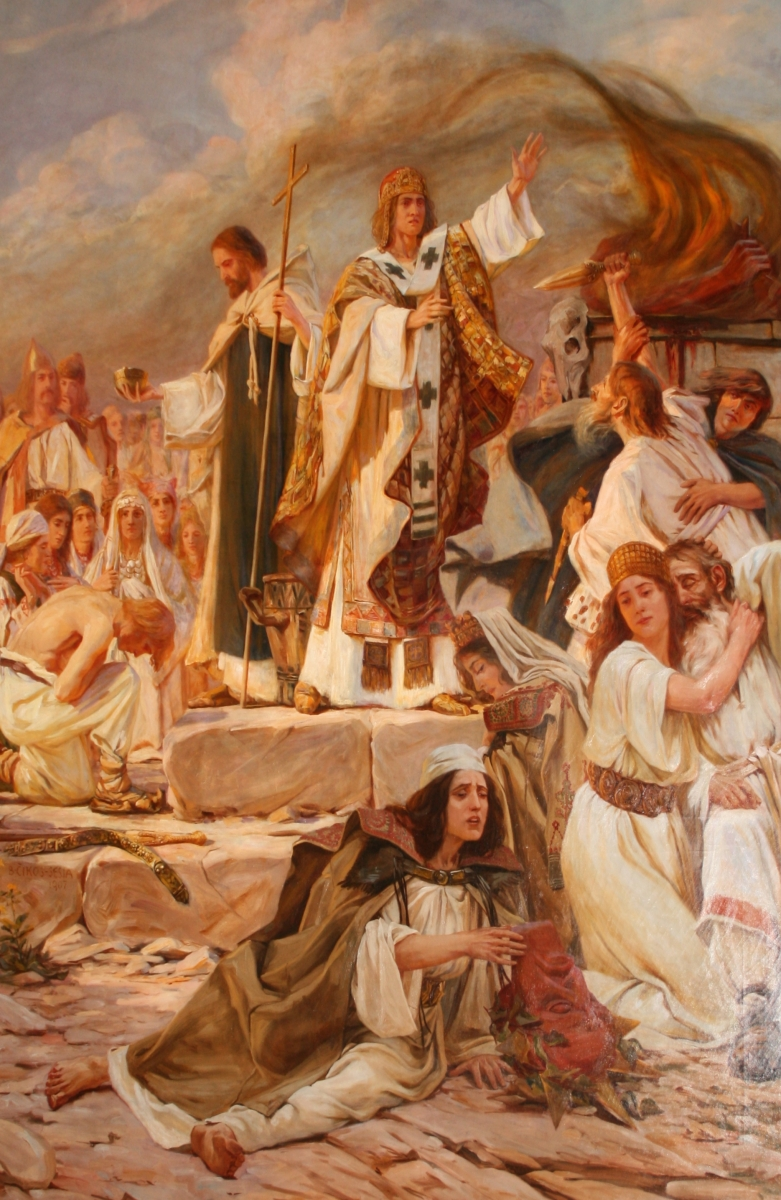
Baptism of the Croats by Bela Čikoš Sesija

According to the work De Administrando Imperio written by the 10th-century Byzantine Emperor Constantine VII, the Croats had arrived in what is today Croatia in the early 7th century AD. Croats had first contact with the Holy See in year 641 when the papal envoy led by then Abbot Martin (Pope Martin I) came to them in order to redeem Christian captives and the bones of the martyrs that Croats were keeping, as well as to evangelize the Croats, and to turn them from paganism.

According to emperor Constantine, Croats made a pact with Pope Agatho (678-681) in which they agreed not to attack neighboring nations or lead any conquest wars, while the Pope promised them that they would be protected by God and Saint Peter in return. Since emperor Constantine did not mention the Pope's name, historians have different opinions about the agreement. Some, like Franjo Rački, Nada Klaić, and Tadija Smičiklas, consider it to be fake, while others, like Ferdo Šišić, believed that it is legitimate mostly due to the style of writing which matches with that of the Roman Curia. Šišić believed that this event took place in the 9th century during the reign of Duke Branimir. According to other sources, the Pope addressed Slavs as the converted people, so Stjepan Krizin Sakač believed that Croats indeed made an agreement with Pope Agatho in year 679.

In the year , Croatian duke Branimir wrote a letter to Pope John VIII in which he promised him loyalty and obedience. Pope John VIII replied with a letter on June 7, 879, in which he wrote that he celebrated a Mass at the tomb of St. Peter at which he invoked God's blessing on Branimir and his (Croatian) people. In year 925 Croatian King Tomislav was corresponding with Pope John X on the occasion of the first Church Council of Split. The Pope's letter to King Tomislav is the first international document in which a Croatian ruler was called rex (king), so that is why Tomislav is considered to be the first Croatian king.

=== Middle ages ===
On March 13, 1177, Pope Alexander III became the first pope to visit Croatian territories. Pope Alexander visited Palagruža, Vis, Zadar and Rab. He entered Zadar on a white horse, and was welcomed by a huge crowd that was singing songs in Croatian. He bowed before the relics of Saint Anastasia. This was documented on the memorial plaque in the Zadar Cathedral. In Rab, the Pope dedicated the Cathedral. This visit, during which he stayed in Zadar for three days, occurred because of a storm that occurred while he was on his way to the Republic of Venice where he signed an agreement with the Holy Roman Emperor Frederick I.

During the Croatian–Ottoman Wars that lasted from the 15th to 19th century Croats strongly fought against the Turks which resulted in the fact that the westernmost border of the Ottoman Empire and Europe became entrenched on the soil of the Croatian Kingdom. In 1519, Croatia was called the Antemurale Christianitatis by Pope Leo X.

=== Modern times ===
After 1527, Croatia was part of the Austrian Empire, which signed a concordat with the Holy See in 1855 regulating the Catholic Church within the empire.

==== In the Kingdom of Yugoslavia ====
In 1918, Croatia become part of the Kingdom of Yugoslavia. Negotiations on the concordat between the Kingdom and the Holy See were led in 1936 by the Yugoslav Minister of Justice Ljudevit Auer and Cardinal Eugenio Pacelli (who later become Pope Pius XII). Negotiations were eventually terminated due to opposition by the Serbian Orthodox Church which claimed that the Catholic Church would be privileged. So the Catholic Church remained the only religious community in the Kingdom which did not have regularized relations with the state. During this period, Stjepan Radić, leader of the Croatian Peasant Party, heavily criticized Catholic clergy, and advocated establishment of the Indigenous Croatian Catholic Church and its separation from the Holy See.

==== During World War II ====
In 1941, the Nazi puppet state, so-called Independent State of Croatia (NDH), was established by the fascist dictator Ante Pavelić and his Ustaše movement. The regime pursued a genocidal policy against the Serbs (who were Eastern Orthodox Christians), Jews, Romani, and many others. Historian Michael Phayer wrote that the creation of the NDH was initially welcomed by the hierarchy of the Catholic Church and by many Catholic priests mostly because Pavelić was pro-Catholic, viewing Catholicism as an integral part of Croat culture which the Church saw as an opportunity to strengthen its position. British writer Peter Hebblethwaite wrote that Pavelić was anxious to get diplomatic relations and a Vatican blessing for the new Catholic state but that "neither was forthcoming" because the Holy See has been linked to its traditional practice of not recognizing newly created entities during wartime. However, Edmond Paris notes that Aloysius Stepinac wanted Croatia's independence from the Serb dominated Yugoslavia which he considered to be "the jail of the Croatian nation" so he arranged an audience between Pavelić and Pope Pius XII. Paris stated that in Stepinac's journal, Aloysius Stepinac on August 3 noted that the Holy See via facti recognised the NDH.

==== In SFR Yugoslavia ====
After the Second World War, Croatia become part of the communist-governed Socialist Federal Republic of Yugoslavia. At first, president and marshal Josip Broz Tito tried to break the centuries-long link between Croatia and the Holy See by offering Archbishop Stepinac a Croatian national church but Stepinac refused, which eventually resulted in attacks on the bishops in the summer of 1952. Pope Pius XII, wishing to pay tribute to archbishop Stepinac for his faithfulness, elevated him to the College of Cardinals in 1953, which triggered a reaction from the Yugoslav government. SFR Yugoslavia cut diplomatic relations with the Holy See, accusing it of interfering in internal state affairs. Stepinac was put on trial and eventually found guilty for his cooperation with the Nazi occupiers during the WWII. The Holy See reacted by excommunicating President Tito and some other officials who participated in the trial.

After 13 years, on June 25, 1966, SFR Yugoslavia and the Holy See signed the Protocol by which the two states established very limited relations on the level of government delegates to the Holy See and an Apostolic delegate with the function of envoy to Yugoslavia. This Protocol did not made it possible to sign a concordat or any other legal document that would regulate relations between church and state. It, among other things, stated that "the Catholic Church, in its religious framework, cannot misuse its religious and church functions in order for it to have a political character." On August 15, 1970, Yugoslavia and the Holy See established diplomatic relations at the level of ambassadors. Yugoslavia became the first socialist republic with whom the Holy See established diplomatic relations following the more liberal direction it took after the Second Vatican Council.

In March 1971, president Tito visited the Holy See and Pope Paul VI, thus becoming the first leader of a socialist republic to come to the Holy See on official visit. Vatican daily L'Osservatore Romano addressed words of welcome to the President on its front page with the words "Greetings President Tito". According to the Croatian diplomat and Vatican analyst Vjekoslav Cvrlje who served as a first Ambassador of Yugoslavia to the Holy See, President Tito was given special attention by the Pope. When Tito arrived at the Ciampino Airport he was greeted by Cardinal Giovanni Benelli and many other senior Vatican officials. During his address to the Pope, Tito said: "Your Holiness, I'm especially pleased to have this opportunity to meet with you and to convey to you the assurance of a high respect from the people and government of Yugoslavia."

The highest ranking Croatian prelate in the Holy See was cardinal Franjo Šeper who served as a Prefect of the Congregation for the Doctrine of the Faith from 1968 to 1981.

=== After independence ===
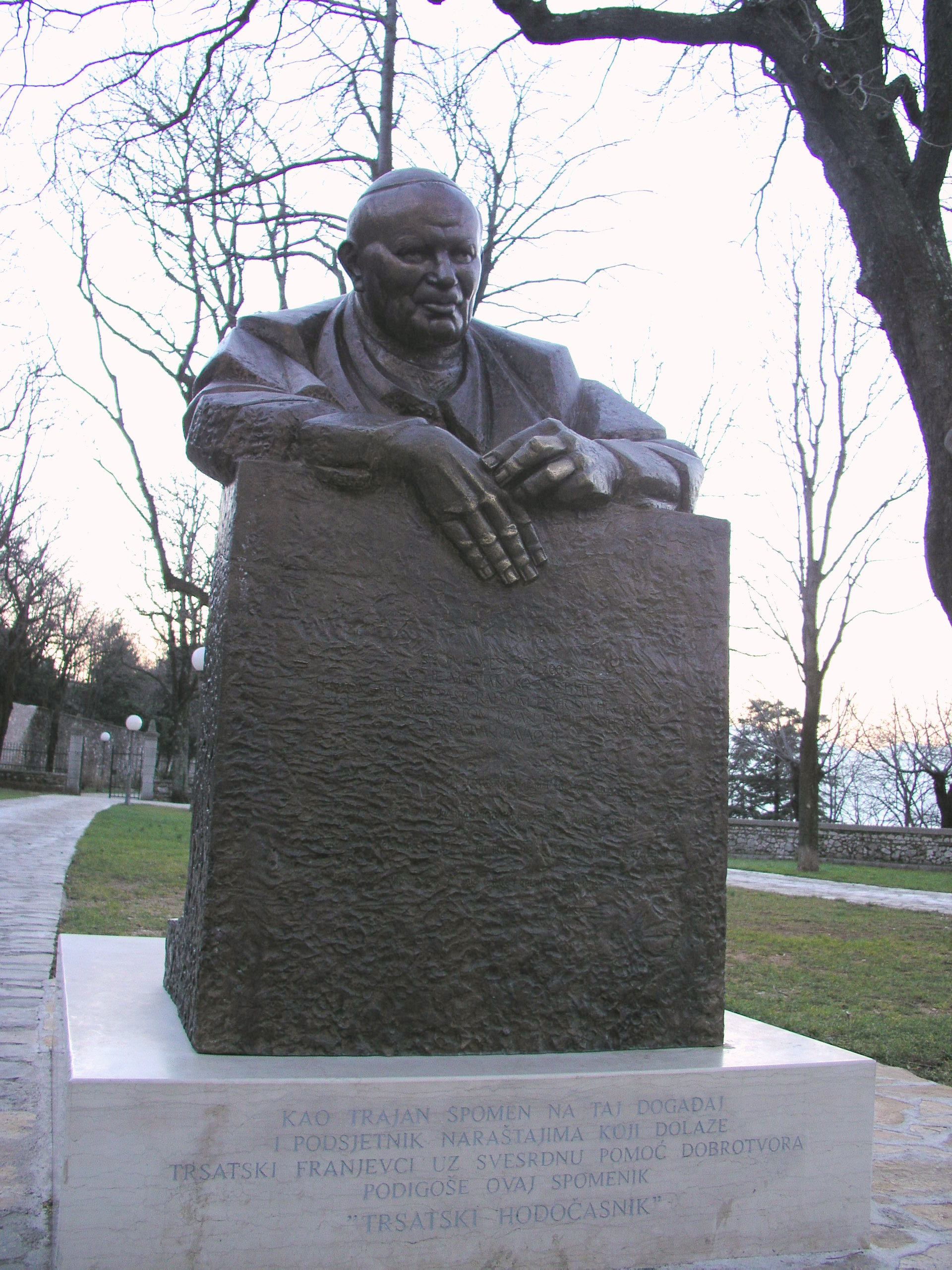
Statue erected on Trsat in honor of the visit of Pope John Paul II

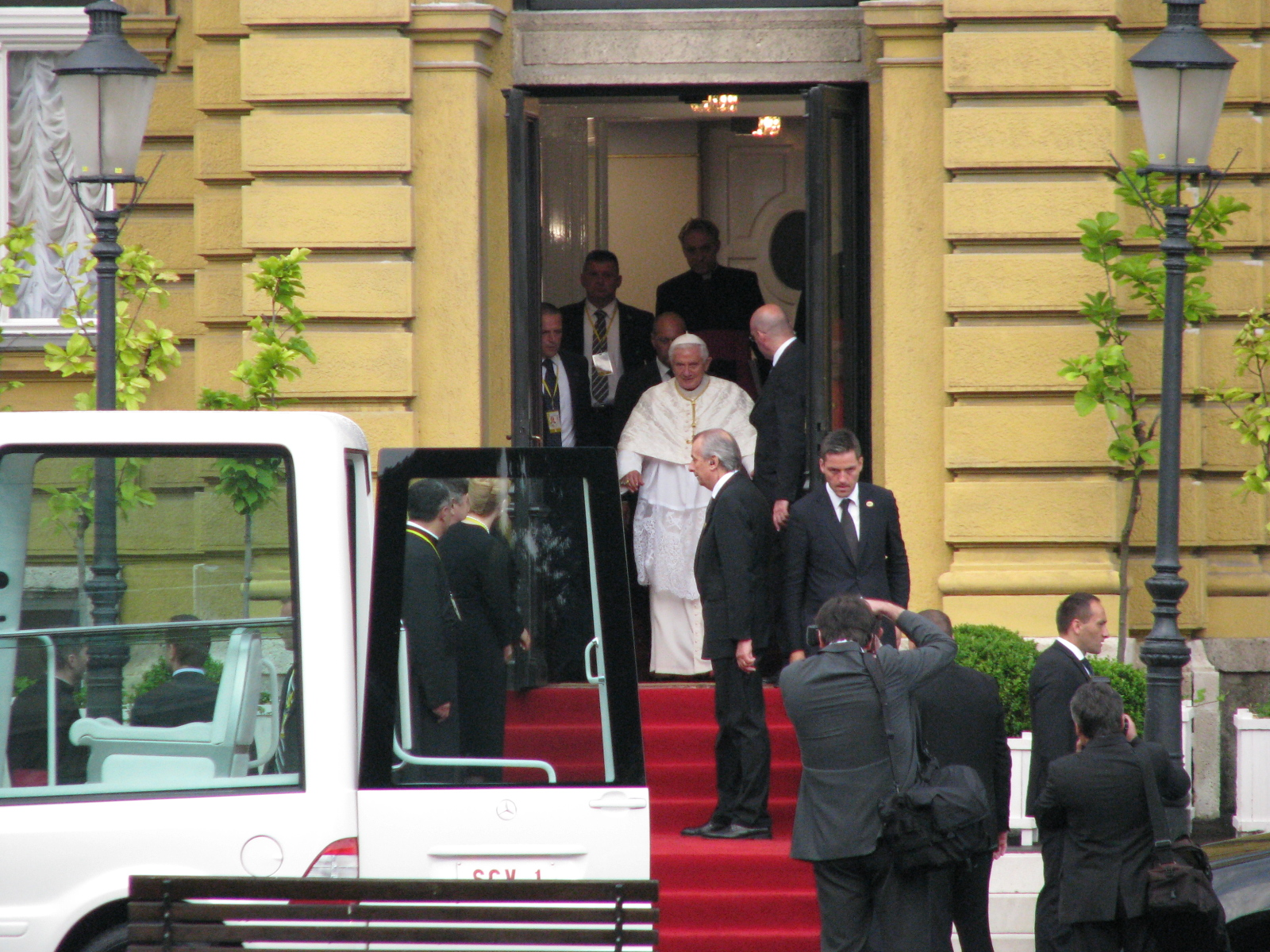
Pope Benedict XVI emerges from the Croatian National Theatre in Zagreb, 2011

After Croatia declared independence from SFR Yugoslavia in June 1991 due to a series of political upheavals and conflicts within the Federation, the Holy See, namely Pope John Paul II, became one of the most keen advocates of Croatian recognition by the international community. Although the Holy See is cautious in recognizing new states, it announced on October 3, 1991, that its diplomacy was working actively on Croatian international recognition. On December 20, 1991, the Holy See announced its intentions to recognize Croatia as an independent state. On November 21, 1992, Angelo Sodano, Cardinal Secretary of State, gave to the ambassadors of the member states of the Organization for Security and Co-operation in Europe to the Holy See a Memorandum in which the Holy See urged their countries to recognize Croatia as soon as possible. The Holy See officially recognized Croatia as an independent state on January 13, 1992, thus becoming the fifth fully independent country to do so.

Pope John Paul II become the first pope to visit the Republic of Croatia. This was on September 10, 1994, during the period of the Croatian War of Independence. On September 11, the Pope led the Eucharistic celebration in Zagreb in front of about a million people on the occasion of the 900th anniversary of the establishment of the Archdiocese of Zagreb. He also officially opened and blessed the building of the Apostolic Nunciature in Zagreb. John Paul visited Croatia two more times; from October 2 to 4, 1998, during which he canonized Cardinal Stepinac at the Eucharistic celebration in the Croatian National shrine of Marija Bistrica, in front of about 500 thousand people, and he later celebrated Mass on the occasion of the 1700th anniversary of the city of Split; from June 5 to 9, 2003, during which he visited Krk, Rijeka, Zadar, Dubrovnik, Osijek, and Đakovo. He left with words: "I greet you beloved Croatian people! Thank you young Croatians as well. May God bless you, Croatian land! God bless you! May God continue to bless and protect Croatia! It will always have a privileged place in my love and in my prayers!" Then Pope Benedict XVI visited Zagreb, Croatia, from June 4 to 5, 2011.

Croatia and the Holy See signed four concordats. The first is about cooperation in the field of education and culture; ratified on January 24, 1997; the second is about spiritual guidance of Catholics who are members of the Croatian armed forces and police, ratified on January 24, 1997; the third is about legal matters, ratified on February 9, 1997; the fourth is about economic cooperation, ratified on December 4, 1998. These concordats have allowed the Catholic Church to provide religious education in state primary and secondary schools, establish Catholic schools, conduct pastoral care among Catholics in the armed forces and police, and to get financed from the state budget. As regards financing, the Church has received the following amounts of money over the last decade: 2001, 461.3 million kunas; 2004-2007, 532 million kunas; 2008-2011, 475.5 million kunas; 2012–2013, 523.5 million kunas; plus around 200 million kunas each year for teachers of religious studies in schools, and around 60 million kunas for maintenance of churches which are considered to be a cultural heritage. These contracts, in particular the fourth one, triggered numerous critics.

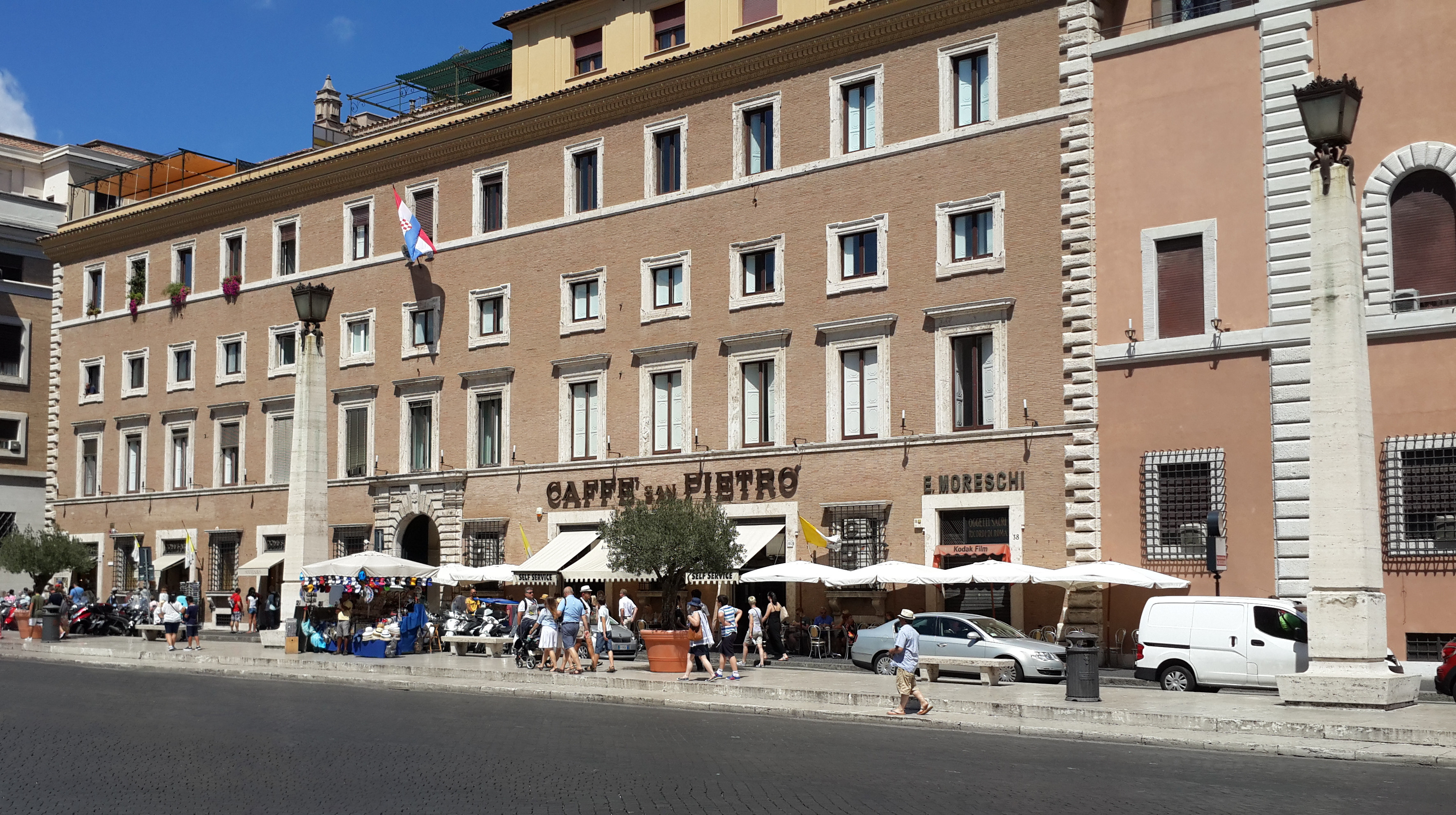
Embassy of Croatia to the Holy See in Rome

== Resident diplomatic missions ==
- Croatia has an embassy to the Holy See in Rome.
- Holy See has an Apostolic Nunciature in Zagreb.

== See also ==
- Foreign relations of Croatia
- Foreign relations of the Holy See
- Roman Catholicism in Croatia
- Apostolic Nuncio to Croatia
- Holy See–Yugoslavia relations
