= Bosnia and Herzegovina–Holy See relations =

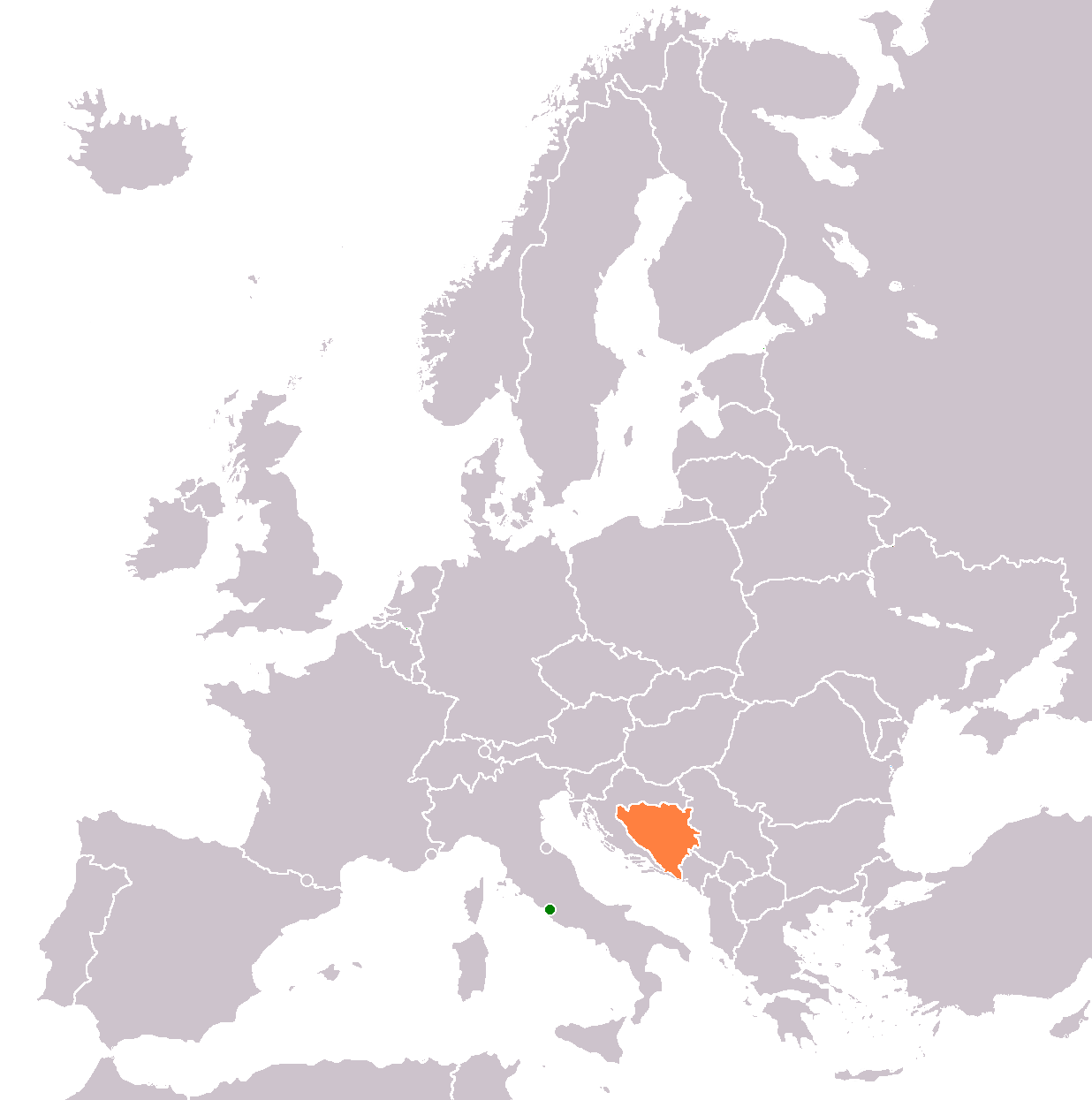

- Holy See: Bosnia and Herzegovina

Diplomatic mission
- Apostolic Nunciature to Bosnia and Herzegovina (Sarajevo): Embassy of Bosnia and Herzegovina (Rome)

Envoy
- Francis Chullikatt: Slavica Karačić

Bosnia and Herzegovina and the Holy See have maintained diplomatic relations since the former declared independence in 1992. The two states have signed a concordat, and there have been three papal visits to the multiconfessional Bosnia and Herzegovina. The relations with the Holy See have generally been fostered primarily by the Bosnian Croat (or Catholic) and Bosniak (or Muslim) officials, but sometimes aggravated by Bosnian Serb (or Orthodox) officials.

== History ==
The Holy See's relations with medieval Bosnia were strained at best. The Papacy was hostile towards Bosnia due to the growing independence and strength of the Bosnian Church, labelled heretical by the Roman Catholic and Serbian Orthodox Church. Pope Innocent III sent a legate to Ban Kulin in 1203, receiving the Bosnian ruler's formal submission. In practice, nothing changed. Popes Honorius III and Gregory IX preached a war against Bosnia, culminating in the unsuccessful Bosnian Crusade in 1235. The relations between the Holy See and Bosnia eventually improved. Pope Pius II even sent a crown to be used at the coronation of King Stephen Tomašević in 1461. Two years later, however, the independent Kingdom of Bosnia was put to an end by the expanding Ottoman Empire.

The Holy See recognized the independence of the Republic of Bosnia and Herzegovina from the Socialist Federal Republic of Yugoslavia on 7 April 1992, a month after the country's independence referendum. Beginning on 20 August 1992, the Holy See was among the first countries to establish diplomatic relations with Bosnia and Herzegovina, a multiconfessional country with three constituent peoples: the mostly Muslim Bosniaks, the mostly Orthodox Serbs and the mostly Catholic Croats.

== Concordat ==
The signing of the concordat with Bosnia and Herzegovina was prevented in June 2007 by Serb members of the House of Peoples of Bosnia and Herzegovina, who complained that the country's relations with the Serbian Orthodox Church should be regulated first. The Bosniak Deputy Chairman of the House of Peoples, Sulejman Tihić, emphasized that the concordat would be an international convention unlike the agreement with the Serbian Orthodox Church, a religious community rather than a state, but his efforts to stress the importance of the country's international relations with the Holy See were ignored by the Serb members.

The concordat was finally ratified by the Presidency of Bosnia and Herzegovina on 20 August 2007, recognizing the "public juridical personality of the BiH Catholic Church" and granting "a number of rights, including the recognition of Catholic holidays".

== State visits ==
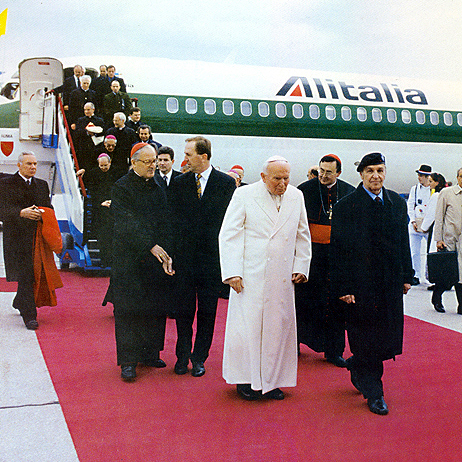
Izetbegović and Zubak greeting John Paul at the airport in April 1997

Pope John Paul II planned to visit Sarajevo, the capital of Bosnia and Herzegovina, during the Bosnian War in 1994. The Bosnian Serb leaders, who besieged the city, said they would not guarantee his safety, and the visit was cancelled.

Pope John Paul II paid a state visit in April 1997, following the end of the war. Momčilo Krajišnik, the Serb member of the tripartite Presidency of Bosnia and Herzegovina, refused to welcome John Paul at Sarajevo International Airport on 12 April, saying that Orthodox Christians do not recognize popes. The Muslim member and Chairman of the Presidency, Alija Izetbegović, was there to welcome the Pope, however. The visit went ahead despite police discovering a cache of 23 land mines planted alongside the former Sniper Alley, through which John Paul was supposed to be driven; Izetbegović offered to accompany his guest along the route "as a gesture of solidarity against terrorist threats". On 14 April, the Pope met with all three members of the Presidency, including Krešimir Zubak and Momčilo Krajišnik, addressing them jointly before individual meetings with each.

Members of the Presidency, namely Mirko Šarović, Sulejman Tihić and Dragan Čović, paid a state visit to the Holy See on 21 March 2003, with the Serb Chairman Šarović inviting Pope John Paul II to visit Bosnia and Herzegovina once again. The Pope's subsequent visit to the now Serb Orthodox-dominated Bosnian city of Banja Luka, on 22 June, "was one of the coolest welcomes" he had ever received.

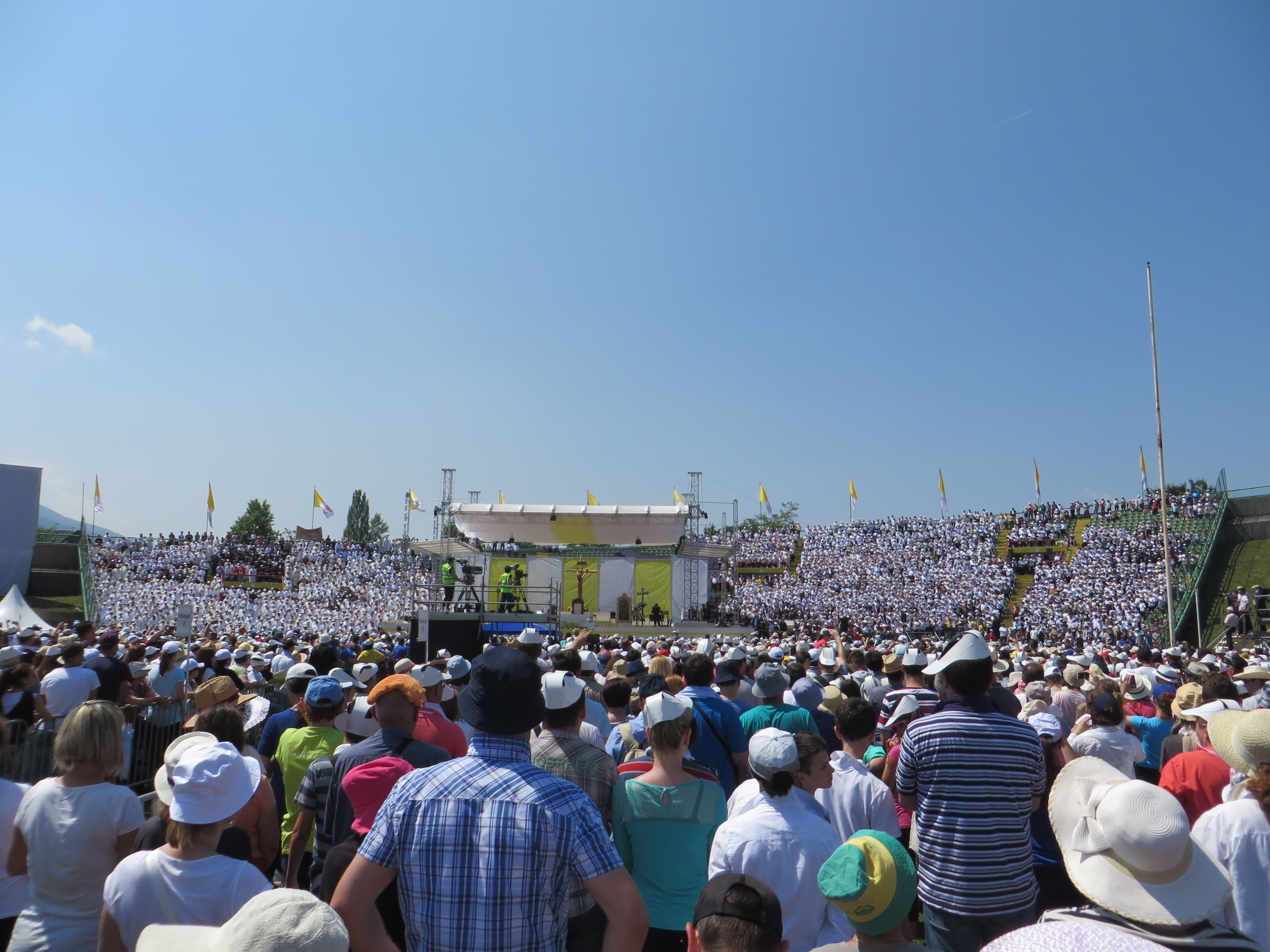
Pope Francis celebrating a mass at the Koševo City Stadium in June 2015.

The most recent papal visit to Bosnia and Herzegovina took place on 7 June 2015, when Pope Francis travelled to Sarajevo, continuing his trips to largely-Muslim countries. He met with members of the Presidency – Chairman Mladen Ivanić, Dragan Čović and Bakir Izetbegović – at the presidential palace. Chairman Čović's visit to Pope Francis on 1 June 2017 was a private papal audience.

== Envoys ==
The current Apostolic Nuncio to Bosnia and Herzegovina is Francis Chullikatt, appointed by Pope Francis on 1 October 2022. Slavica Karačić, the current Ambassador of Bosnia and Herzegovina to the Holy See, handed her diplomatic accreditation to Pope Benedict XVI on 10 January 2013.

== See also ==
- Foreign relations of the Holy See
- Foreign relations of Bosnia and Herzegovina
- Holy See–Yugoslavia relations
