= Asti (restaurant) =

- Interactive map of Asti

Restaurant information
- Established: 1924
- Closed: 2000
- Location: 13 East 12th Street, New York City, New York, 10003, U.S.
- Coordinates: 40°44′3.6″N 73°59′36.5″W

Adolph's Asti was an Italian restaurant in New York City's Greenwich Village. It was unique in that many of the waiters were professional opera singers who routinely performed for the restaurant guests. Asti first opened in 1924, and was open for over 75 years before closing on New Year's Eve 1999–2000.

== History ==
Located at 13 E. 12th St. in Manhattan, Asti was started in 1924 by Adolph Mariani (father of opera great Lorenzo Mariani). Around November 15, 1967 there was a kitchen fire.

The restaurant closed in 2000, and the space is now home to a Strip House restaurant.

== Description ==
The walls of Asti featured many framed, autographed photographs of opera singers past and present, including Enrico Caruso, Beniamino Gigli, Giovanni Martinelli, and Jerome Hines. In the center of the restaurant was a grand piano alongside a small stage-like platform with a microphone. During a typical evening at Asti, members of the waitstaff would spontaneously perform an aria or two onstage. A restaurant guest might be invited to sing as well. Other wild and crazy activities would occasionally take place, such as turning the lights down low while several of the guests marched through the restaurant in masks, to the sound of "spooky" music (the Anvil Chorus from Il Trovatore). One regular feature was a performance where someone dressed as a pizzeria chef would "ceremonially" toss around a clump of pizza dough, though Asti actually did not serve pizza.

Asti fare consisted primarily of pasta, seafood, and meat dishes. They also had a lengthy wine list.

== In popular culture ==
Asti made a brief appearance in the movie Big, for Josh's 13th birthday party.
