= The Yugoslav Auschwitz and the Vatican =

1992 book by Vladimir Dedijer

The Yugoslav Auschwitz and the Vatican: The Croatian Massacre of the Serbs During World War II
- Author: Vladimir Dedijer
- Original title: Vatikan i Jasenovac; Vatikan i Jasenovac Dokumenti
- Language: Serbian
- Genre: Non-fiction
- Publisher: Rad Publishing House, Prometheus Books
- Publication date: 1987
- Publication place: Serbia
- English publication date: 1992
- ISBN: 978-0879757526

The Yugoslav Auschwitz and the Vatican (1992) is a history by Vladimir Dedijer, a Yugoslav university professor and human rights activist, who was a World War II Partisan and communist revolutionary.

This English-language edition combines in a shortened version Dedijer's two books written in Serbian: Vatikan i Jasenovac and Vatikan i Jasenovac Dokumenti, published by Rad Publishing House Belgrade in 1987. It was published in English under the title, The Yugoslav Auschwitz and the Vatican: The Croatian Massacre of the Serbs During World War II by Prometheus Books, in 1992 (ISBN 978-0879757526).

Described as a polemical work, without the usual support of bibliography and footnotes, this history explores the genocide in Croatia beginning in 1941 under the authority of Ante Pavelić, and conducted by secular Ustasha and Catholic religious figures, including clergy. Among the atrocities described is the massacre of prisoners at Jasenovac concentration camp, in which an estimated 750,000 Orthodox Serbs were killed. Dedijer used eyewitness accounts and testimony from postwar trials of officials responsible.

This text was also published in German as Jasenovac, das jugoslawische Auschwitz und der Vatikan, by Ahriman-Verlag GmbH (January 31, 2001). He documents the repression and genocide in Yugoslavia during the war of Orthodox Christian Serbs by Catholics in Croatia, with the support of high-level Vatican officials.

== See also ==
- Holy See–Yugoslavia relations
