= John G. Taft =

American financier and writer

- Born: 1954 (age 71–72)
- Education: Taft School
- Alma mater: Yale University
- Occupations: Financier, writer
- Years active: 1970s-present
- Employer: Baird (Vice Chairman)
- Political party: Republican
- Website: johngtaft.com

John G. Taft (born 1954) is an American financier and writer. He is currently a Vice Chairman of Baird and member of the firm's executive committee.

Early in his career he worked as a journalist before entering the investment industry in 1981. Early positions with Piper Jaffray and the St. Paul Mayor's Office were followed by roles as CEO of Voyageur Asset Management and Dougherty Summit Securities. His unit at Dougherty was later acquired by Dain Rauscher, and Taft began working with Royal Bank of Canada (RBC) when it acquired Dain Rauscher in 2001. From 2005 until 2016 Taft was CEO of RBC's U.S. wealth management unit, RBC Wealth Management. He came out of retirement in January 2018 and joined Baird as a Vice Chairman. Other previous roles include serving as chairman of Delaney|Taft LLC, a director of the Columbia Threadneedle Funds and a senior advisor to Deloitte and Touche LLP.

Taft is a prolific writer, and his work often focuses on the themes of responsible investing and the financial services sector's role in society. His op-eds have appeared in publications such as Forbes and The New York Times, and he often covers topics such as corporate responsibility, trends in the banking industry, diversity, and the state of modern American politics. He has authored two books: A Force for Good: How Enlightened Finance Can Restore Faith in Capitalism in 2012, and Stewardship: Lessons Learned from the Lost Culture of Wall Street in 2015. Past chairman of the Securities Industry and Financial Markets Association (SIFMA), he remains active in SIFMA and in organizations such as the Andy Warhol Foundation for the Visual Arts and The Minneapolis Foundation.

== Early life and education ==
Born in 1954, John Godfrey Taft was raised in New Haven, Connecticut. Taft and his two brothers are grandsons of Senator Robert A. Taft and great-grandsons of former United States President William Howard Taft. Their father Horace Dwight Taft worked as dean of Yale College. After graduating from the Taft School in Watertown, Connecticut in 1972, Taft graduated in 1977 from Yale University magna cum laude.

By 1977, after working as a copy boy with the New York Times, Taft furthered his career as a newspaper reporter in Lowell, Massachusetts, where he spent several years "covering the rebuilding of Lowell." Developing an interest in urban redevelopment and the financing of community projects, he then attended graduate school at Yale University in New Haven to learn about finance.

== Career ==
=== Early positions ===
In 1981 he entered the investment industry, moving to Minnesota and taking a public finance position with the regional brokerage firm Piper Jaffray. With Piper Jaffray, he spent ten years helping a variety of clients, including governments and finance projects for public use. The city of St. Paul, Minnesota was among his clients, and Taft spent two years working for the Mayor of St. Paul as an assistant. After serving as managing director at Piper Jaffray, he went on to become president, CEO, and chairman of Voyageur Asset Management, the asset-management business of Dougherty Financial Group. During that time, Taft also served as a director of Segall, Bryant and Hamill and The Clifton Group. Voyageur was sold to and became a unit of the brokerage firm Dain Rauscher, a regional brokerage firm.

=== RBC Wealth Management ===
The Toronto-based Royal Bank of Canada (RBC) acquired Dain Rauscher in 2001. Taft was appointed to a management role at RBC, becoming head of asset management and products for RBC’s United States and international division. Returning to Minneapolis, Taft became CEO of RBC's US retail brokerage arm, RBC Wealth Management US, in September 2005. Under Taft, RBC Wealth Management avoided major financial difficulties in the 2008 financial crisis, and its assets under management increased 60% between 2008 and 2011, to $220 billion. In an effort to allow the unit's financial advisors to dedicate more time to clients, between 2008 and 2011 Taft "boosted RBC's annual technology spending by 50%," and encouraged advisors to work in teams.

=== Acquisitions and DelaneyTaft ===
After advocating for the addition of banking and lending to RBC's capabilities in the United States, in November 2015 he helped facilitate RBC's acquisition of City National Bank for $5.4 billion. The merger added "banking and lending capabilities to the firm’s advisor force." After a number of other acquisitions as well, by early 2016 Taft's unit of 1,900 financial advisors was overseeing $273 billion of assets in 41 states. Beyond his role as CEO of RBC Wealth Management US, Taft served on the board of RBC’s intermediate US holding company and was a member of RBC’s Global Wealth Management Operating Committee. He was also executive sponsor for RBC’s PRIDE employee resource group. After deciding it was "the right time to pass on the CEO baton," Taft retired as CEO of RBC Wealth Management on May 31, 2016. He went on to serve as chairman and CEO of Delaney|Taft LLC, director of the Columbia Threadneedle Funds and a senior advisor to Deloitte and Touche.

=== Baird ===
After retiring from RBC, Taft took on a number of consulting roles across the financial services industry. In 2018, he exited retirement to join Baird, a Milwaukee, Wisconsin-based financial services firm. He is currently a Vice Chairman and member of the firm's executive committee. Taft helps lead "strategic opportunities across Baird's platform, including the continued expansion of Baird's private wealth management business." He also is a member of the board of Hilliard Lyons Trust, a director of RiverFront Investment Group and a senior advisor to LFE Capital, a private equity firm that invests in women-owned and women-managed companies.

== Writing and speaking ==
=== Books ===
On August 3, 2012, Taft published his first book, Stewardship: Lessons Learned From the Lost Culture of Wall Street. Endorsed by former US Representative Barney Frank, the book focused in part on the financial crash of 2008, with Taft also advocating for stewardship in the financial industry. Amazon.com selected Stewardship as one of their “top picks" for March 2012, while Bloomberg Radio named it the “best book of spring."

Through St. Martin's Press, on March 17, 2015 he published A Force for Good: How Enlightened Finance Can Restore Faith in Capitalism. Taft wrote the introduction and edited the book, which includes 20 essays by individuals in business or finance such as John Bogle, Sheila Bair, Mary Schapiro, and Robert Shiller. The essays cover topics such as "creating a stable retirement system, rebuilding investor trust, and using investment strategies that help protect the environment." As summarized by Wealth Management, the book "pulls together commentary from industry leaders… to discuss how the financial services industry can harness its power for the public good."

=== Op-eds and speaking ===
Taft's op-eds have been published in magazines and newspapers such as Harvard Business Review, Business Insider, Barron's, Forbes, and The New York Times. Interviewed on CNBC's Squawk Box, CNN, FOX, Bloomberg TV and Radio, The Wall Street Journal, The New York Times, Barron's, Fortune, and the Financial Times, he has also been a speaker at institutes and events such as the Center for Ethical Business Cultures and the Securities Industry Institute.

In his op-ed and talks, he often covers topics such as corporate responsibility, trends in the banking industry, and the state of modern American politics. Supportive of the rights of transgender and gay employees, when Minnesota considered a ballot to ban same-sex marriage in late 2012, Taft made appearances in media sources such as The Economist to speak against the ballot. In 2013 he criticized the Republican Party's use of United States' sovereign debt as political leverage for being "the heights of irresponsibility."

In 2015 he gave the keynote speech at the Forum for Sustainable and Responsible Investment, where he advocated for sustainable business practices and investments. In 2009, Taft testified before the United States House of Representatives Financial Services Committee in favor of a fiduciary standard of care for professionals, when providing financial advice to individuals. However, in early 2016, Wealth Management reported that Taft had been fighting against attempts to "apply the... fiduciary standard to brokers" by the US Department of Labor (DOL), with Taft arguing that the DOL's version of the standard would not work for the brokerage industry. Taft advocated that such a standard should instead by written by the US Securities and Exchange Commission (SEC) due to their experience with financial markets.

== Memberships and committees ==
According to MinnPost in 2013, Taft "has a solid reputation for civic, even progressive, involvement in the Twin Cities." He is currently on the boards of the Andy Warhol Foundation for the Visual Arts and The Minneapolis Foundation and is active on the Itasca Project. His past directorships include the Greater Twin Cities United Way, Walker Art Center, Macalester College, Breck School, St. Paul Chamber Orchestra, Northwest Area Foundation, Illusion Theatre, the Minnesota Business Partnership, the Taft School, Minnesota Public Radio (MPR), and Twin Cities PBS (TPT).

Taft has also been on task forces and committees in the public sector, including the Mayor's Council on Economic Development Finance and the CFA Institute's Future of Finance Advisory Council. In 2011 he served as chairman of the Securities Industry and Financial Markets Association (SIFMA). He previously served as chair of SIFMA's Advisory Council, and has represented SIFMA before Congress. In 2020, Taft was re-elected to SIFMA's board of directors.

== Recognition ==
The National Gay & Lesbian Chamber of Commerce (NGLCC) named him an "Outstanding Corporate Diversity Leader" in 2010. In 2013 Investment Advisor magazine named him to its list of the 25 most influential people in the financial industry, and the following year he was named a “Leading Individual" by the Family Wealth Report. In 2014 and 2015 the ethics group Trust Across America named him to its list of the "Top 100 Thought Leaders in Trustworthy Business."

== Personal life ==
Taft became engaged to Martha Ann McPhee in late 1977. The couple lived in Minnesota until her death in 2007 and had three children together. As of 2015 lives in Minneapolis with his wife Laura Delaney, with whom he has two stepchildren.

== Publishing history ==
- Taft, John G. (August 3, 2012). Stewardship: Lessons Learned From the Lost Culture of Wall Street. Audible Studios. ASIN B008S9KFAU.
- Taft, John G. (March 17, 2015). A Force for Good: How Enlightened Finance Can Restore Faith in Capitalism. St. Martin's Press. ISBN 978-1137279729.

== See also ==
- List of Yale University people
- List of Taft School alumni
