= Stevan Dedijer =

Yugoslav academic (1911–2004)

- Born: 25 June 1911; Sarajevo, Condominium of Bosnia and Herzegovina, Austria-Hungary
- Died: 13 June 2004 (aged 92); Dubrovnik, Croatia

Stevan Dedijer (25 June 1911 – 13 June 2004) was a Yugoslav academic and a pioneer of business intelligence.

== Life ==
Stevan Dedijer was born in Sarajevo, Bosnia and Herzegovina to Milica Dedijer and Jefto Dedijer. He attended secondary school in Rome, Italy, and graduated from the Taft School in Watertown, Connecticut, in 1930. He earned a degree in physics at Princeton University in 1934. He worked as a journalist in Pittsburgh and New York City and later, after World War II in Yugoslavia.

Dedijer served in the American army as a paratrooper in The 101st Airborne Division from 1942 to 1945. He deployed into Bastogne during the Battle of the Bulge from December 1944 through January 1945. General Eisenhower and his battle staff had only the 101st Airborne and the 82nd Airborne in the immediate area to hold back the German offensive. Both divisions endured great hardship, and nearly 24,000 US military died, since no supplies were able to reach the "Battered Bastards of Bastogne" until the weather improved at the end of January 1945.

Dedijer's brother Vladimir Dedijer fought for the Yugoslav Partisans, and was Tito's biographer after the war.

Dedijer was a Serbian communist recruited by the Office of Strategic Services to work in occupied Yugoslavia, but OSS later released him after it concluded that he was a Comintern spy sent to the United States to work as a journalist.

In 1949, Stevan Dedijer returned to Belgrade as a researcher at the Belgrade Nuclear Institute. From 1952 to 1955, he was the director of this institute, though from 1954 onward, he was gradually removed from Yugoslav political positions and he found his work conditions deteriorating throughout the later 1950s.

He was forced to leave Yugoslavia in 1961, and spent a year at the Niels Bohr Institute in Denmark before moving to Sweden. He was awarded an Honorary PhD from the University of Lund in Sweden, and after a short time at Lund University's Physics Department founded the Research Policy Institute at the university.

Dedijer's research focus was on Business Intelligence and he has been named the grandfather of business intelligence by his friend, the late CIA Director William Colby.

Dedijer was the first person in Europe to teach business/competitive intelligence at a university. He was a co-founder of the Swedish Intelligence Network BISNES (Business Intelligence & Strategy Network Scandinavia) together with his Ph.D. student Hans Hedin and the Swedish Intelligence firm Docere Intelligence AB.

Stevan Dedijer was awarded the SCIP Meritorious Award for his services in this field.

During the air war in Kosovo, Dedijer lived in Dubrovnik and befriended Lieutenant Colonel Randolph Hampton, US Army who had spent nearly 45 months in the Balkans. LTC Hampton was in Dubrovnik as part of an advance party which would deploy into Kosovo for post war operations. During those months, Dedijer would meet LTC Hampton and review not only his years with the 101st ABN Division, but the historical, political and social ramifications of the war in the Balkans. LTC Hampton and Cathrine Andersen, a Norwegian OSCE human rights representative, hosted Dedijer's 88th birthday at the Marco Polo Restaurant in Old Town Dubrovnik.

Stevan Dedijer died at his home in Dubrovnik, Croatia.

== See also ==
- Socialist Federal Republic of Yugoslavia
- Jefto Dedijer
- Vladimir Dedijer
