= Research Policy Institute =

Academic research institute at Lund University, Sweden

The Research Policy Institute (Swedish: Forskningspolitiska institutet) at Lund University, Lund, Sweden, is an academic research institute devoted to studies of science, technology and society. Founded in 1966 by Stevan Dedijer, the institute is nowadays a part of Lund School of Economics and Management. The institute's research program is divided on three main areas: "Research policy, and the dynamics of scientific fields", "Knowledge and innovation for development", and "Studies of risks and risk management (including social intelligence)". It has a newly started doctoral programme in research policy, which is the first in the specific field in Sweden.
