= Lorenzo Mariani =

Opera director

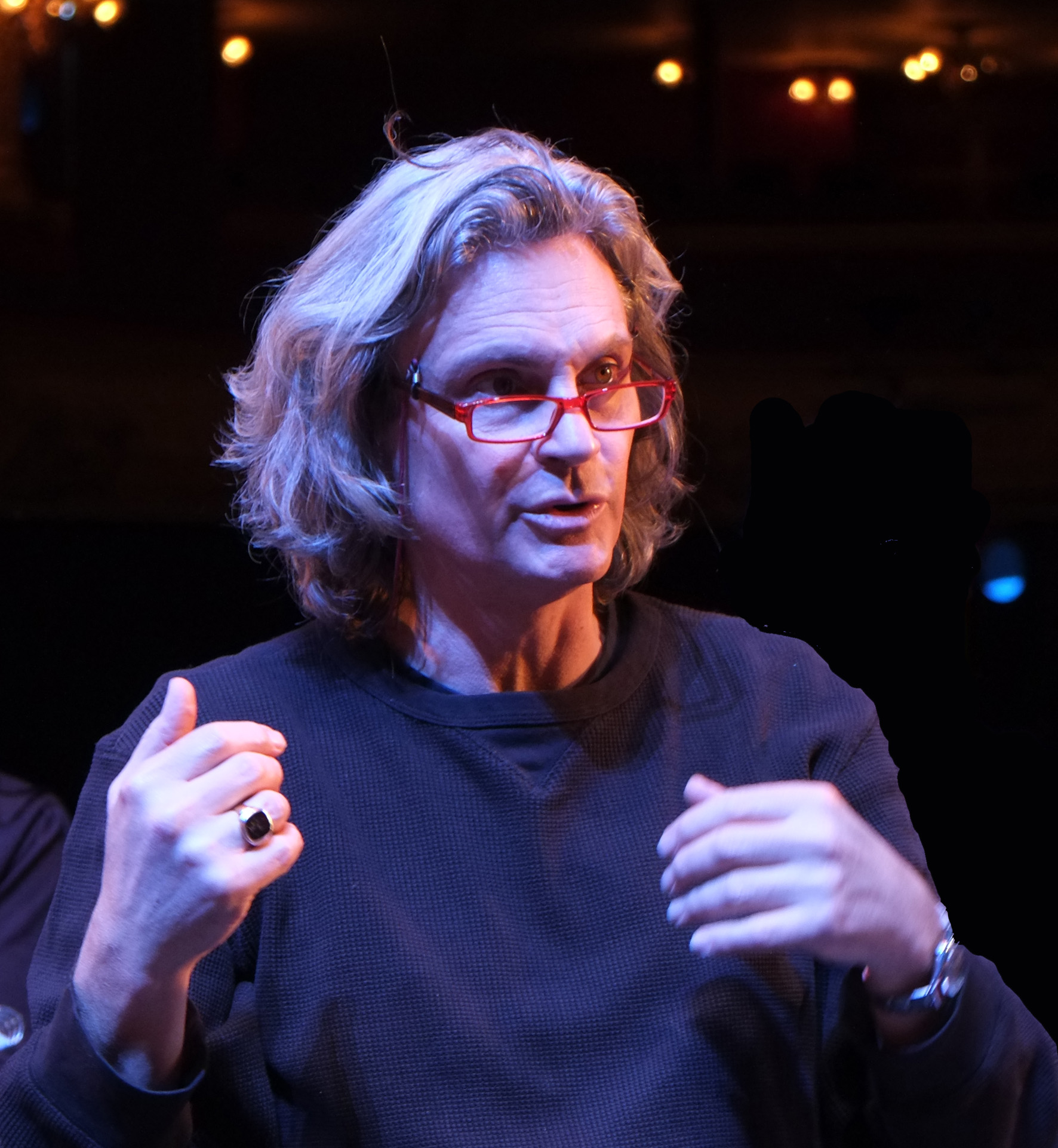
Directing La fanciulla del West in Liège, Belgium, 2013

Lorenzo Mariani is an international opera stage director, artistic director, and educator based in Italy. His productions have been seen throughout Europe, Asia, and United States including Israel, Finland, Sweden, Japan, and China. Mariani has collaborated with celebrated conductors Claudio Abbado, Zubin Mehta, Carlos Kleiber, Daniele Gatti and John Eliot Gardiner, and worked with opera icons Placido Domingo, Leo Nucci, Ferruccio Furlanetto, Mariella Devia, Marcelo Álvarez, Daniela Dessì, Simon Keenlyside, Bryn Terfel, Ekaterina Semenchuck, and close friend Andrea Bocelli. From 2005 to 2013 Mariani was artistic director of one of Europe’s most important opera houses and the largest theater in Italy, the Teatro Massimo in Palermo. He has taught in Italy, Great Britain, Sweden, and China.

== Early life ==
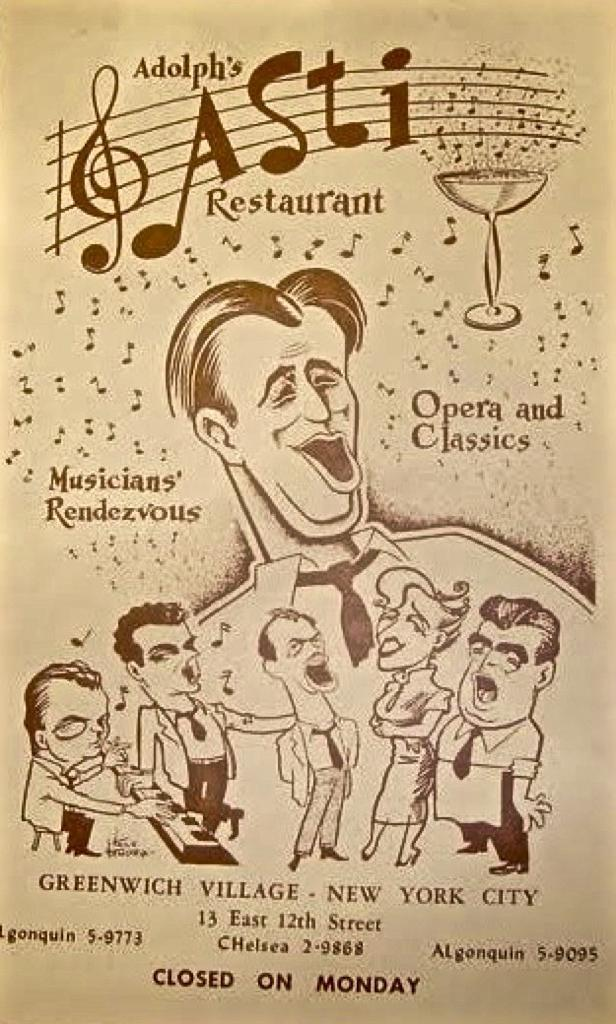
Menu for Asti restaurant

Mariani was born in New York City, the son of Italian immigrants from La Spezia. His father, Adolfo Mariani, aspired to be an opera singer and studied voice with lyric tenor Alessandro Bonci, a contemporary of Enrico Caruso. In 1930 Adolfo opened the Asti restaurant in Manhattan, where waiters performed Italian opera, arias and choruses. Over the next 70 years Asti became a Greenwich Village landmark. Rising opera stars including a young Maria Callas sang full-time as soloists at the restaurant whose guests included theater and opera stars Franco Corelli, Luciano Pavarotti, Cesare Siepi, and Joan Sutherland. Mariani’s father became a respected voice teacher himself. As a teenager, Lorenzo accompanied his father on the piano as Adolfo gave lessons to tenor Corelli and Siepi, among others. The Asti walls were covered with autographed photos of opera greats and celebrities like Joan Crawford, Babe Ruth, and Noël Coward and the décor included four original theater seats from the old Metropolitan Opera House.

== Taft and Harvard ==
At The Taft School in Connecticut, Mariani was deeply involved in music and theater. As head of the student drama group, The Masque and Dagger Society, he directed and acted in several productions. In his senior year, he performed a striking piano recital of George Gershwin's Rhapsody in Blue

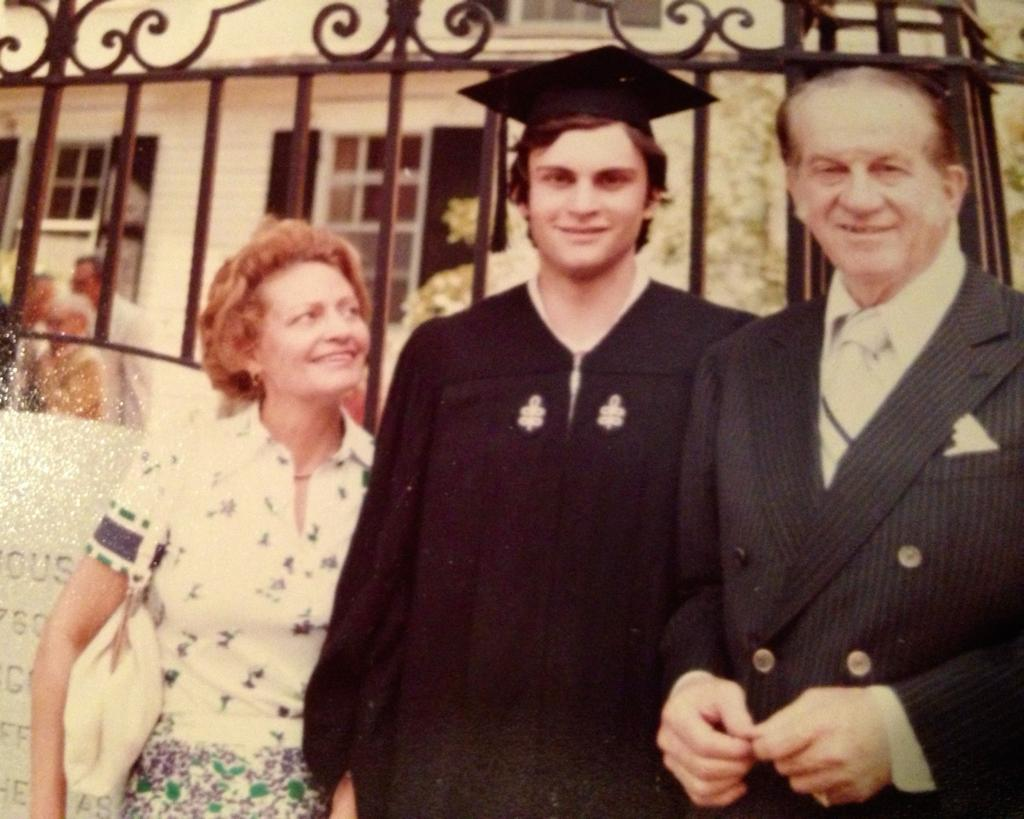
Mariani with his parents at his Harvard graduation, 1977

As an undergraduate at Harvard, he was recognized for his performance in Nathanael West's Miss Lonelyhearts. At Harvard’s Loeb Theater, Mariani directed the production of George Bernard Shaw's Candida and was the first director to stage an opera, Vincenzo Bellini’s I Capuleti e i Montecchi. He also gave American theater director Peter Sellars his first staging opportunity with Shakespeare's Coriolanus. While a student, Mariani wrote articles on film, music, Italian politics and opera for the Harvard Crimson. He graduated from Harvard in 1977 with a degree in Romance Languages and Literature. His thesis was on Italian playwright and author, Luigi Pirandello.

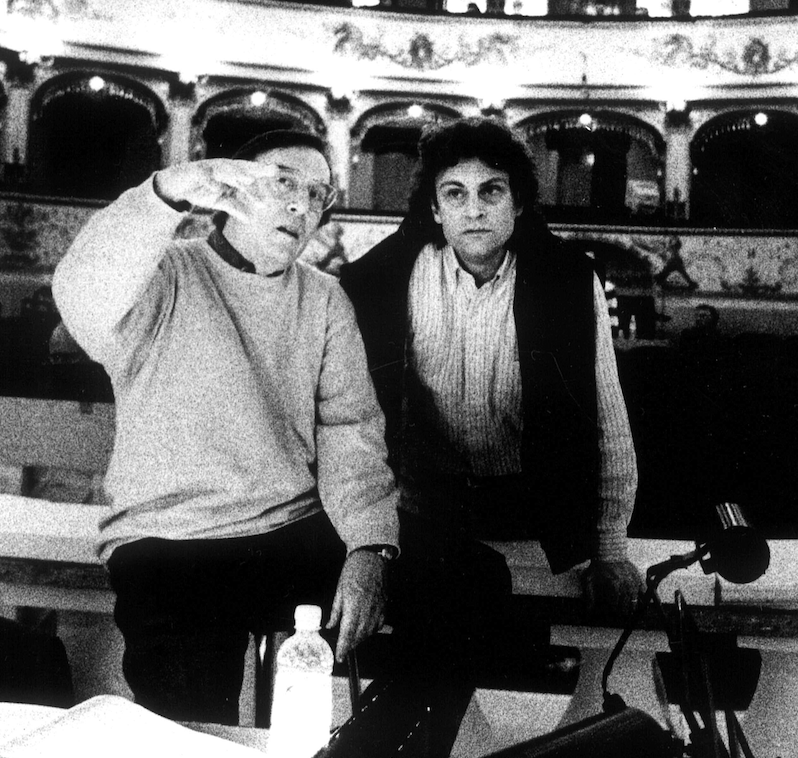
With conductor Claudio Abbado in 1997

== Early opera stagings ==
After graduating from Harvard, Mariani was awarded a Foundation Grant to study literature and theater in Italy.

Throughout the 1980s he worked as an assistant to Italian director, Franco Zeffirelli, collaborating on his productions of La Traviata in Florence, Paris, and New York and on the films Otello starring Placido Domingo and Young Toscanini starring Elizabeth Taylor. He made his opera staging debut with Bartók's Bluebeard's Castle at the Teatro Comunale in Florence. Mariani continued to collaborate for more than three decades with the Maggio Musicale Fiorentino Festival (MMF). In 1997, Mariani directed Andrea Bocelli's operatic debut in La Bohème in Cagliari and more recently directed Bocelli in Lucia di Lammermoor in 2018 in Genova. Throughout Italy, Mariani also directed at the Teatro Comunale di Bologna, Teatro Regio di Torino, Teatro La Fenice, Teatro del Opera di Roma, and Teatro San Carlo di Napoli.

In addition, he has worked at prominent international opera houses such as the San Francisco Opera, Chicago's Lyric Opera, Goteborg Opera, Greek National Opera, the Finnish National Opera, The Savonlinna Opera Festival, Israeli Opera, The New National Theatre Tokyo, and Shanghai Grand Theatre—which he inaugurated. Through the 1990s and onward, he forged a close working relationship with Claudio Abbado (Don Giovanni) and Zubin Mehta (La Forza del Destino, Aida, Nozze di Figaro). In 2003, Mariani staged Italian pop star Lucio Dalla's musical Tosca Amore Disperato.

== Teatro Massimo di Palermo ==
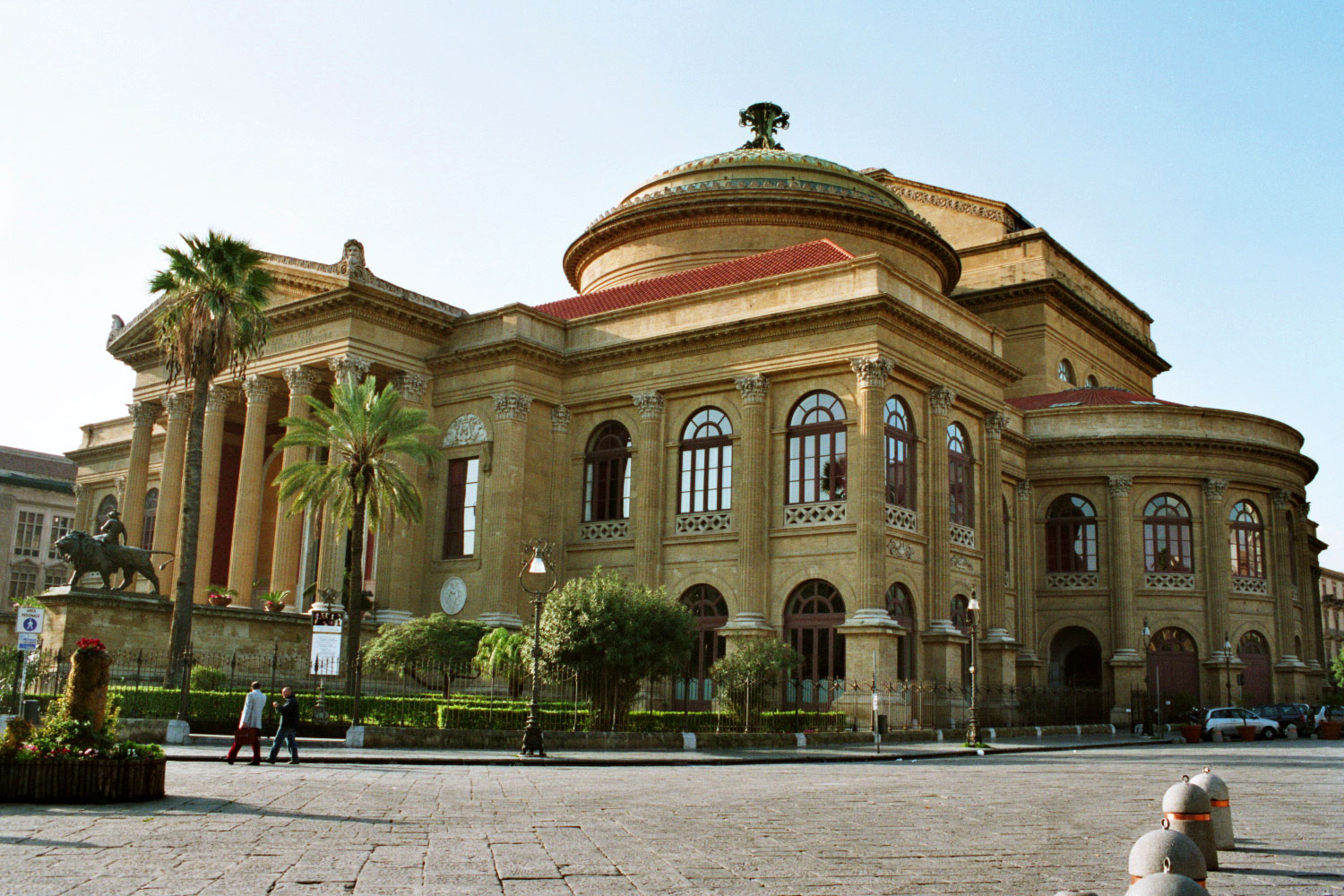
Teatro Massimo of Palermo

From 2005-2013, Mariani held the position of Artistic Director at the Teatro Massimo ("The Greatest Theater"), located on the Piazza Verdi in Palermo. His nomination was historic, the first time in Italy a stage director was named Artistic Director of an opera house. During his tenure, Mariani established the Teatro Massimo as a point of reference for Opera Houses in Italy and Europe. With innovative projects and programming, he doubled the production output while winning four Premio Abbiati awards (The Franco Abbiati Prize), Italy’s leading award for artistic achievement in Opera. Mariani also undertook prestigious international projects during this time, organizing tours for the Massimo to Japan (Otsu and Tokyo) in 2007 and Finland (Savonlinna) in 2009. In addition, he brought co-productions from theaters across the world, including San Francisco, Bruxelles, Barcelona, Santiago del Cile, English National Opera, staged by artists such as Graham Vick, Damiano Michieletto, Terry Gilliam, Laurent Pelly and Calixto Bieito. Mariani’s pioneer program for children, teens, and young adults established the Massimo as a model for other Italian Opera Houses to develop new audiences. For this, the theater was awarded an Abbiati Prize in 2011. The theater’s fourth Abbiati prize during Mariani’s tenure was for Graham Vick’s production of Wagner’s Der Ring des Nibelungen. During this period, for Rome's Accademia di Santa Cecilia, Mariani staged The Rake's Progress and The Threepenny Opera starring Italian rock star Elio—a special project commissioned by composer Luciano Berio for the Kurt Weill Centennial.

== Post Palermo years (2014-present) ==
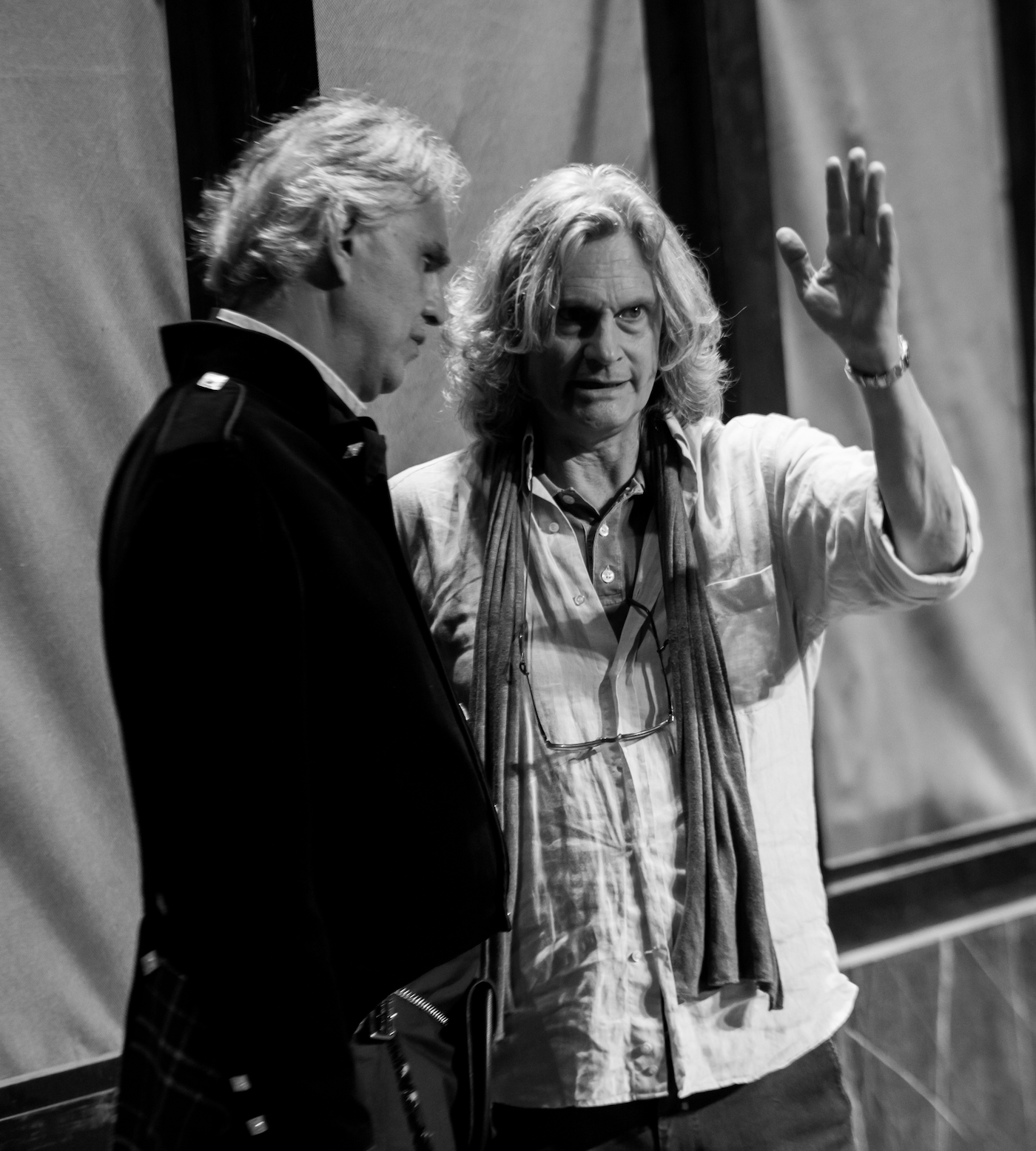
Lorenzo directing Andrea Bocelli in Lucia di Lammermoor in Genova, 2018

In the years following Palermo, Mariani continued working as an international opera director. Among his important productions: La fanciulla del West in San Francisco and Liege, Adriana Lecouvreur in Seville and Bilbao, Macbeth in Athens, Don Giovanni and Cosi fan tutte at the MMF, Il Barbiere di Siviglia and La Traviata at the Baths of Caracalla, and Cavalleria Rusticana and Pagliacci in Almaty, Kazakhstan. His production of Il Trovatore, staged at the Circo Massimo in Rome and conducted by Daniele Gatti, was revived at Teatro La Fenice and in Bilbao, Spain. Mariani's new production of Madame Butterfly premiered at the Maggio Musicale Fiorentino Festival in October 2024, also conducted by Gatti.

== Teaching and philosophy ==
In 2002 Mariani volunteered to teach at the Kodaikanal International School in Tamil Nadu, India, giving classes in literature, music and theater. He received a master’s in philosophy at the University of London, Birkbeck College in 2017. His thesis, “Evaluating an Opera Staging: A Proposal for Criteria" was judged “With Distinction” and praised by English philosopher Roger Scruton. At the Royal College of Music in London, he led a seminar in 2017 in which students performed scenes from the operas of Benjamin Britten at The Britten Theater.

Since 2020 Mariani has run the highly successful project “Opera Lab” at the prestigious Accademia Chigiana in Siena—a workshop for conductors, directors, singers, and designers in which students produce and perform an opera each summer under the tutelage of Mariani and other professionals including Daniele Gatti, William Matteuzzi, and Gianni Tangucci. Operas produced include Rossini’s L'occasione fa il ladro, Il Signor Bruschino, Trilogia Verdiana, and most recently Don Pasquale in July 2024.

Currently, Mariani is professor at the Verona Opera Academy where he teaches the “Theory and Practice of Opera Staging”.

External videos
- You can watch a video of Lorenzo Mariani discussing his work here
