= Edmund Rice (colonist) =

English immigrant to Massachusetts Bay Colony

- Edmund Rice homesite marker tablet in Wayland, Massachusetts. (Note: The Edmund Rice Homesite Marker designed by Boston architect Arthur Wallace Rice is located in the town of Wayland (formerly East Sudbury), Massachusetts at 42.343814°N 71.365357°W near the "Old Connecticut Path" Indian Trail. Although the marker raised on 13 September 1913 states that Edmund Rice was born in Buckinghamshire, England, later research in the 1930s concluded that he was most likely to have been born in Suffolk.)

Deputy of the Great and General Court of the Massachusetts Bay Colony
- In office 1640, 1643, 1652 – 1654

Selectman of Sudbury, Massachusetts
- In office 1639, 1640, 1644 – 1656

Judge of Small Causes Sudbury, Massachusetts
- In office 1641–1655

Selectman Marlborough, Massachusetts
- In office 1657–1663

Personal details
- Born: c. 1594 Suffolk, England
- Died: 3 May 1663 (aged 69) Marlborough, Massachusetts Bay
- Resting place: Old North Cemetery, Wayland, Massachusetts 42.370942°N 71.369048°W
- Relatives: full list
- Profession: Yeoman farmer, Surveyor, Land owner, Deacon of Puritan Church

Edmund Rice (c. 1594 – 3 May 1663) was an early English settler to Massachusetts Bay Colony born in Suffolk, England. He lived in Stanstead, Suffolk and Berkhamsted, Hertfordshire before sailing with his family to America. He landed in the Colony in summer or fall of 1638, thought to be first living in the town of Watertown, Massachusetts. Shortly thereafter he was a founder of Sudbury in 1638, and later in life was one of the thirteen petitioners for the founding of Marlborough in 1656. He was a deacon in the Puritan Church, and served in town politics as a selectman and judge. He also served five years as a member of the Great and General Court, the combined colonial legislature and judicial court of Massachusetts.

== Biography ==
Edmund Rice's rough birth date of 1594 is reckoned from a 3 April 1656 court deposition in Massachusetts in which he stated that he was 62 years old. His most likely birthplace was in Suffolk is found through the town of his marriage and of his earliest children's births. Many of the church records from 1594 in Suffolk are lost, so any record of his birth or the names of his parents or any of his forebears is unknown. (Note: Several internet-based genealogical sources claim royal ancestry of Edmund and his descendants. These claims of royal ancestry with connection to Rhys ap Gruffydd (c 1508-1531) of Wales and his supposed son William Rice (1522-1588) of Buckinghamshire are most certainly in error. All these claims of royal ancestry have been traced by Donald Lines Jacobus, Gary Boyd Roberts, and others to a 1911 book By the Name of Rice, written and self-published by Charles Elmer Rice of Alliance, Ohio, who also sold fabricated "family trees" connecting totally unrelated Rices to Edmund Rice.) Edmund Rice had a presumed brother, Henry (c. 1580-1621), who married Elizabeth Frost (sister of Edmund's wife Thomasine) on 12 November 1605 at St. James Church, Stanstead, Suffolk 52.111652°N 0.690641°E. Repeated attempts to find record of Edmund Rice's birth or the birth of his presumed brother Henry in church or civil records of the Stanstead, Sudbury, Haverhill, and Bury St. Edmunds region of Suffolk have not been successful and the records are presumed to be lost.

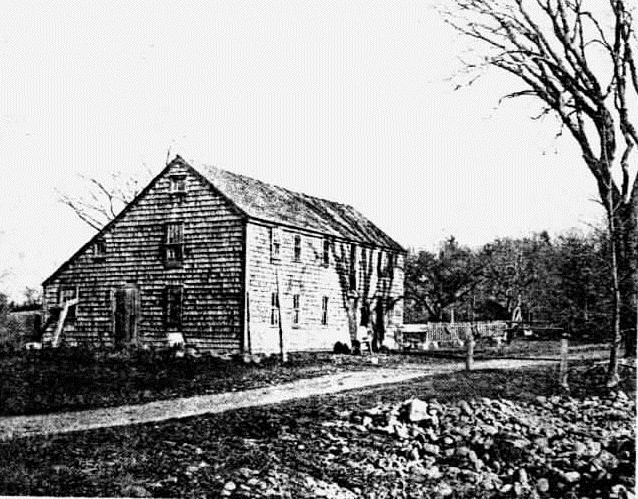
Edmund Rice Homestead built about 1643 by Rice in saltbox style by the spring feeding the Sudbury River near the Old Connecticut Path in southeastern Sudbury (now Wayland). It stayed in the Rice family many generations until it burned down sometime around 1910. (Note: The chain of title of the homestead in the Rice family in Sudbury land records begins with the 3 April 1640 grant of land at the homesite to Edmund by the Sudbury Board of Selectmen. The house was likely built about 1642-43, as Edmund sold his house and four acres in the original Sudbury settlement to John Moore on 13 September 1642. The land and 'house near the spring" was first sold to Philemon Whale (the husband of Edmund's sister-in-law Elizabeth) on 23 October 1643 and then it was reacquired by Edmund in the late 1650s. The house was passed on in probate to Edmund's son Edward (1622-1712) in June 1663. Edward Rice deeded the house to his son Edmund Rice (1653-1719) as a gift on 21 April 1686, who in turn deeded the house to his son Jason Rice (1692-1730) on 14 Nov 1718. Upon his death, Jason Rice passed on the house to his son Edmund Rice (1725-1796) on 12 Dec 1749. Edmund passed on the house to his son Edmund Rice (1755-1841) on 22 Feb 1796, who in turn passed the house on to his son Edward Rice, Sr. (1793-1868) when he died in 1841. In probate in 1868 Edward, Sr. passed the house on to his son Edward Rice Jr. (1824-1917), who held the house until it burned down sometime before 1910.) The house was located at 42.344897°N 71.3666763°W off present-day Charena Rd. in Wayland.

Considerable information about the early life of Edmund Rice in England can be gleaned from his children's baptismal records, as well as land ownership and other public records in Stanstead, Suffolk and Berkhamsted, Hertfordshire. He moved from Stanstead to Berkhamsted sometime in 1626, based upon the baptismal dates of his children Thomas and Lydia. That same year as a newcomer in town, Rice was named as a joint trustee along with Rev. Thomas Newman (Note: Rev. Thomas Newman served as rector of St. Peter's Church in Berkhamsted for over 40 years (1598-1639) and served for a time as a Chief Burgess of Berkhamsted and mayor in 1631. According to parish records, Newman was the second husband of Bridget (Dryden) Marbury, who was mother of Anne Marbury Hutchinson by way of her first husband Francis Marbury. Despite being a staunch Anglican, by 1645 Newman fell into political disfavor by being barred from the rectory of St. Peter's by Act of Parliament for a payment delinquency.) of a £50 grant for the benefit of the poor from King Charles I given on the occasion of his coronation. Under the incumbency of Rev. Newman, Rice served as a churchwarden at St. Peter's Church and acted as overseer of the poor for eight years. As a result of a royal inquisition held on 1 April 1634, funds remaining in the custody of Rice and Newman were to be transferred to the bailiff and burgesses of Berkhamsted as part of an effort to transfer and consolidate several royal charity grants for administration under civil authority. (Note: Documents regarding the royal grant and the transfer of funds to civil officials never refer to Edmund Rice as "Mr. Rice" as was customary for men of high status. In Berkhamsted, Edmund was considered an ordinary yeoman farmer. Rice's service as a lay official in High Church Anglican St. Peter's Church in Berkhamsted is in contrast to his service as a Puritan Deacon later in life in Massachusetts.) While living in Berkhamsted, Rice acquired and was taxed on 3 acres (12,000 m^{2}) of land in 1627, and on 15 acres (61,000 m^{2}) from 1633 to 1637. There is no record in Berkhamsted of Rice paying taxes on his land in 1638, possibly due to its sale to finance his trip to America. (Note: It is possible to estimate the cost of passage of Edmund and his family to America based upon other families of comparable size traveling at that time during the Puritan Great Migration. According to Powell (1963), Edmund's Sudbury town mate, Peter Noyes and his family sailed from England aboard the ship Jonathan on 12 April 1639 in a party consisting of 11 people along with provisions and family effects. The bill of passage was £76.8.0. It should also be noted that Hudson (1889) states that on 24 April 1638, Noyes and some of his family arrived on the ship Confidence in Boston from Southampton captained by John Jobson. After petitioning the General Court to form Sudbury in September 1638, Noyes returned to England to accompany additional family and servants on the April 1639 voyage aboard the Jonathan.)

There is no surviving record of Edmund Rice's voyage to America with his family, but it was surmised to have occurred between the 13 March 1638 baptism of his son Joseph in Berkhamsted and the petition to the Great and General Court to found Sudbury, Massachusetts 6 September 1638, showing all the Sudbury petitioners residing in Watertown, Massachusetts. (Note: The original 1638 grant of lands by the Great and General Court to form Sudbury included lands that in addition to Sudbury, eventually became the present day towns of Wayland and Maynard as well.) However, the 1638 petition to the General Court to found Sudbury did not explicitly mention Rice's name, so documentation of Rice's presumed short-term residence in Watertown is poor. (Note: The petitioners specifically mentioned in the 6 September 1638 Petition to form Sudbury were Watertown residents Brian Pendleton, Peter Noyes, and Rev. Edmund Brown, but other unnamed petitioners were included as "and Company" in the petition.) The first documented record of his presence in Massachusetts is in the Township Book of Sudbury prior to 4 April 1639 in which he was already serving as a selectman. (Note: In the archives of Sudbury, there is documentation that Edmund was serving simultaneously as a selectman and a land surveyor prior to 4 April 1639. According to an undated town ordinance from 1639 (likely to be sometime in March 1639 based on the context of the ordinance text; March was considered the first month of the year based upon the Annunciation Style Julian calendar then in use), "It is ordered and agreed that everyman within the towne that hath any land ly in any generall field that they shall make all such fences that apertayne to the field and sufficient; by the 4th of Aprill in this yeare and if any man shall fayle herein after the warnings given by the surveyors apoynted for that purpose or such time that they shall apoynt the persons so offending shall forfeit for every default 5 shillings. Edmund Rice and Robert Darnell for the north field; Thomas Goodnow and Andrew Belcher for the south field; We give these men power to levy for all such fines after 7 dayes after every default." Signed, Brian Pendleton, Peter Noyes, Walter Hayme, Edmund Rice. Since winter crossings of the Atlantic were hazardous, and thus rare, it can be reasonably concluded that Rice did indeed arrive in Massachusetts during the summer or fall sea voyage season of 1638.)

Between 1638 and 1657, Rice resided in Sudbury where he became a leader in the community. Sumner Chilton Powell wrote in his 1964 Pulitzer Prize-winning Puritan Village: The Formation of a New England Town, "Not only did Rice become the largest individual landholder in Sudbury, but he represented his new town in the Massachusetts legislature for five years and devoted at least eleven of his last fifteen years to serving as selectman and judge of small causes." He was appointed on 4 September 1639 by the General Court to lay out the roads and lots of Sudbury, and he was granted 4 acres (16,000 m^{2}) of land near the original Sudbury meetinghouse 42.373835°N 71.372609°W. On 3 April 1640, Rice was granted 20 acres (81,000 m^{2}) in southeastern Sudbury near the Old Connecticut Path. (Note: According to the land grant by the selectmen of Sudbury on 3 April 1640, "Granted to Edmond Rice formerly twenty acres of upland lying betweene the land of Edmond Rice and Mr. Dunster's farm." signed, Peter Noyes, William Ward, Edmund Goodenow, Walter Hayme, and Hugh Griffyn) He served as a selectman in Sudbury in 1639 and 1640, and subsequently for several years between 1644 and 1656. He was designated by the General Court as a freeman on 13 May 1640, and was first elected as a deputy (representative) of the Great and General Court in October 1640. He was later appointed by the General Court on 2 June 1641 as a Judge of Small Causes for Sudbury, serving until 1648 in the appointed position. Then from 1648 until 1654 he was elected and reelected locally in Sudbury as one of the municipal judges. He was reelected for another year term as a deputy of the General Court in 1643. In 1644 Rice and two other Sudbury residents (Peter Noyes and Thomas Mayhew) were appointed to survey the farm properties of the estate of the deceased Joseph Glover near the southeastern boundary of Sudbury to be transferred to Harvard College President Henry Dunster who had married Glover's widow Elizabeth and assumed responsibility for the Glover children. On 18 June 1645, Rice and his colleagues reported to the General Court on their survey. In 1648, Rice was ordained as a Deacon in the Puritan Church at Sudbury. He was appointed by the General Court on 22 May 1651 as a member of a commission to settle a boundary dispute between Watertown and Sudbury, and he was reelected as a deputy of the General Court in each of the three years from 1652 through 1654. Again in May 1656, Rice and Peter Noyes were called upon by the General Court for their expertise to survey 11 acres (45,000 m^{2}) of land purchased by John Stone of Sudbury from the Indians, which was supplemented by a grant of the General Court to Stone of an additional 50 acres (200,000 m^{2}) in what is now Framingham. Stone erected a gristmill on his property of Stone's End in 1656 that would later become the village of Saxonville. Again in 1662 at the behest of the General Court, Rice and John Howe of Marlborough were called upon to survey 250 acres (1.0 km^{2}) of land in the area now known as Framingham that they deemed to be worth £10 to be awarded by the General Court to Thomas Danforth as compensation for his services to the Colony and Harvard College.

Edmund Rice was particularly successful in his own real estate transactions. After selling his 4 acres (16,000 m^{2}) of land and homestead near the Sudbury meetinghouse on 1 September 1642 to John Moore, (Note: John Moore (1602-1673) was married on 27 November 1633 in Little Gaddesden, Hertfordshire to Elizabeth Rice (Whale)(1612-1690) the daughter of Edmund's presumed brother Henry and stepdaughter of Philemon Whale. Moore was the father of Elizabeth Moore (ca1628-1705), who married Edmund's eldest son Henry on 1 February 1642 in Sudbury.) Rice established his residence on 13 September 1642 on his 20 acres of land abutting Henry Dunster's farm near the Old Connecticut Path in southeastern Sudbury. Within a year, Philemon Whale and Thomas Axtell, former town mates and kin from Berkhamstead, England established their homesteads on adjacent lots nearby. (Note: Philemon Whale (1599-1676) was married on 24 January 1621/22 at St. Mary's Church, Bury St. Edmunds to Elizabeth (Frost) Rice (1587-1664), sister of Edmund Rice's wife Thomasine and widow to Edmund's presumed brother Henry Rice. Whale and his wife Elizabeth arrived in Sudbury in 1643 from Berkhamsted, the same year that Thomas and Mary (Rice) Axtell (who is either Edmund's eldest daughter or niece by way of his brother Henry) arrived from the same town.) In October 1643 Rice sold Philemon Whale 9 acres (36,000 m^{2}) of land and a house near the Old Connecticut Path in southern Sudbury and also that same month he sold 6 acres (24,000 m^{2}) of adjacent land to Thomas Axtell. (Note: According to Sudbury Land Records dated 23 October 1643, "Philemon Whale bought of Edmund Rice 9 acres of upland be the same more or less lyinge on the south syde of the towne bound of Sudbury between the lande of John Hayme on the south side of it and ioyninge to the springe runninge from his new dwelling house to the river on the west side of it.") But only three years later on 6 May 1646, Rice, along with his son Edward Rice and Philemon Whale, administered the estate of the deceased Thomas Axtell and he purchased back the land from the estate shortly thereafter. On 8 April 1657, Rice purchased the 200 acres (810,000 m^{2}) "Jennison Farm" in the southeastern part of Sudbury. (Note: The "Jennison Farm" tract on the eastern boundary line of Sudbury with Watertown (currently near the eastern boundary of Wayland with Weston) was granted by the Massachusetts Great and General Court in 1638 to Captain William Jennison for his service in the Pequot War of 1636-37. Rice acquired the property as a result of Jennison's return to his hometown of Colchester, Essex. The property was eventually passed on to Rice's son Matthew.) And by 1659, Rice had acquired about 600 acres (2.4 km^{2}) of land in southeastern Sudbury (present day Wayland and Cochituate), including nine acres of land and the homestead purchased back from Philemon Whale (see image of the homestead), and the probated estate of Henry Dunster that included the former Glover family lands. The General Court made grants of land to Rice in what is now Framingham, 50 acres (200,000 m^{2}) in 1652 and 80 acres (320,000 m^{2}) in 1659. These lands in Framingham were passed on to Rice's son Henry in 1659, and became known as Rice's End.

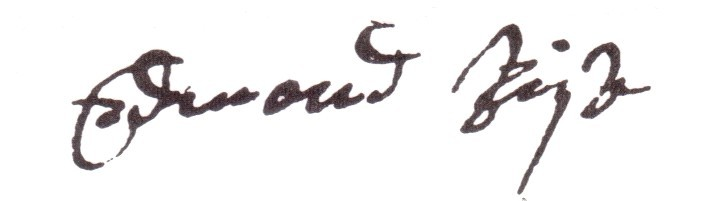
Signature of Edmund Rice on a 1659 land survey record of his estate purchase of the "Dunster Farm" property near Old Connecticut Path in old Sudbury. Original in Harvard University Archives, Cambridge.

As the Enclosure Movement was a contentious political issue in England, the issue of land tenure was also highly contentious in 17th-century Massachusetts Bay Colony and in Sudbury in particular. Open-field or communal farming was practiced in most of Sudbury, following traditions of the commons and governance practices brought from central and western England during the early 17th century. Rice and twelve other dissenters from Sudbury who were interested in 'closed-field' or owner-operator farming as it was practiced in southeastern England, petitioned the Great and General Court in 1656 to create the town of Marlborough where individual ownership of farmland was to be exclusively practiced. The tract of land was 8 square miles (21 km^{2}) west of Sudbury that, in addition to becoming Marlborough, eventually became Northborough, Westborough, Southborough, and Hudson as well. Rice was elected as selectman of Marlborough in 1657 as the town was being established. The town was formally chartered on 12 June 1660 by the General Court. Upon being granted a maximum allotment of 50 acres (200,000 m^{2}) of land in Marlborough, Rice was one of the three largest initial landholders of the new town. According to Powell (1963), the founding of Marlborough with exclusive closed-field land tenure was a seminal event in establishing the predominant freehold or fee simple land tenure system of America. Rice was reelected as selectman in Marlborough every year after 1657 until his death.

The Edmund Rice Memorial designed by Arthur Wallace Rice was erected 29 August 1914 by Edmund's descendants at the Old North Cemetery, site of the First Sudbury Meetinghouse in Wayland, Massachusetts. (42.370943°N 71.369046°W)

Edmund Rice died on 3 May 1663 in Marlborough, Massachusetts, and is presumed to be buried at the Old North Cemetery (site of the first Sudbury Meeting House) in what is now Wayland, Massachusetts 42.370877°N 71.369052°W. Probate records show that his wife, Mercy, was executrix and that his estate including lands and homes in both Sudbury and Marlborough was valued at £743, 8s, & 4p, which was a considerable sum for the time. (Note: During Edmund’s time, the English pound was by definition valued at the price of sterling silver. During the 17th and 18th centuries, the price of silver was relatively stable at about $300 per troy ounce in 2010 dollars. Given the conversion factors of 12 troy ounces to a pound, and 20 shillings to a pound and 12 pence to a shilling, Edmund’s probate inventory (mostly his land holdings) valued at £743, 8s, & 4p would be worth about US$2.67 million in 2010.) For decades, the Edmund Rice estate was disputed in part by heirs of John Moore (1610-1673). The issue of land ownership was eventually settled in 1716 by a transfer of land to John Moore's son, Joseph Moore (1647-1725), by Edmund's grandson (a son of Matthew) Isaac Rice (1668-1717). (Note: Although agreement was eventually reached between Joseph Moore and Isaac Rice in 1716, "...and whereas there hath been contention between the heirs of the above said Edmund Rice and Joseph Moore of the above said Sudbury concerning said lands laid out to the right of said Edmund Rice...", it took until 17 Jan 1725 for the final agreement to be filed with the Middlesex County Registrar of Deeds by Joseph Moore.) The only surviving artifact known to be owned by Edmund Rice and his second wife Mercy Brigham Rice is an antique bible box from the pre-Elizabethan Tudor Period (early 16th Century); it was brought from England by Mercy when she sailed to Massachusetts in 1635. The bible box was donated to the Worcester Historical Museum by Thomas Brigham Rice (1817-1914) in 1910, and it is recognized as one of the earliest known pieces of furniture with a New England history.

== Family data ==
Edmund Rice was married to Thomasine Frost (1600–1654) on 15 October 1618 in St. Mary's Church, Bury St. Edmunds, Suffolk, England 52.242431°N 0.717315°E and they had 10 children including: (Note: Thomasine Frost was the daughter of Edward Frost (1560-1616) and Thomasine (Belgrave) Frost (1 Feb 1561/62-after 1616) of Stanstead. Thomasine Frost's ancestors in Suffolk are well documented on both her paternal and maternal (Belgrave/Strutt) family lines for several generations.)

- Mary Rice, baptized 23 August 1619 at St. James Church Stanstead, Suffolk, England, possibly married Thomas Axtell of Bushey on 10 October 1638 at St. Albans. (Note: It remains unclear whether the Mary Rice in the 10 October 1638 marriage record from the St. Albans Archdeaconry in Hertfordshire refers to Mary Rice (b. 1619), the daughter of Edmund, or alternatively her double first cousin, Mary Rice (b. 1615), the daughter of Edmund's brother Henry, and later, stepdaughter of Philemon Whale, the second husband of Elizabeth Frost, Thomasine Rice's sister. One of the two Marys probably died in England prior to the Rice family emigration to America, but there is no record of this death. The surviving Mary Rice's husband Thomas Axtell (1619-1646) of Bushey was the brother of Col. Daniel Axtell (1622-1660), a prominent military figure in Cromwell's Army of the English Civil War. Mary Axtell married John Maynard 16 June 1646 after death of Thomas earlier that year in Sudbury, Massachusetts. Mary Rice Axtell Maynard was still alive in 1673 when her second husband, John Maynard died and his estate was probated/administered, but no definitive record of her death has ever been found.)
- Henry Rice, baptized 13 February 1620 O.S./1621 N.S. at St. James Church, Stanstead, Suffolk, died 10 February 1710/11 at Framingham, married Elizabeth Moore 1 February 1643/44. Along with his father, Henry was among the first grantees of a 4 acres (16,000 m^{2}) house lot in the first Sudbury settlement in September 1639. Henry Rice and his family were among the first European settlers of the area southwest of Sudbury on the Old Connecticut Path later to become Framingham.
- Edward Rice, baptized 20 October 1622 at St. James Church, Stanstead, Suffolk, died 15 August 1712 at Marlborough, MA, married Agnes Bent in 1646. Edward Rice was one of the original inhabitants of Marlborough having been granted 35 acres (140,000 m^{2}) on 26 November 1660. From 1687 until his death he was one of the two deacons of First Parish in Marlborough (now First Church in Marlborough).
- Thomas Rice, baptized 26 January 1625/26 at St. James Church, Stanstead, Suffolk, died 16 November 1681 at Sudbury, MA, married Mary King 1652. Thomas Rice was one of the original inhabitants of Marlborough, having been granted 35 acres (140,000 m^{2}) on 26 November 1660. Thomas's home was a fortified garrison house during King Philip's War of 1675–78.
- Lydia Rice, baptized 9 March 1627/28 at St. Peter's Church, Berkhamsted, Hertfordshire, died 5 April 1675, at Boston, MA, married Hugh Drury 1645 in Sudbury. Hugh Drury was a carpenter by trade and the family resided in Boston. Drury became a member of the Ancient and Honorable Artillery Company in 1659 and was subsequently its Lieutenant.
- Matthew Rice, baptized 28 February 1628/29 at St. Peter's Church, Berkhamsted, died 1717 at Sudbury, MA, married Martha Lamson 2 November 1654. Matthew resided on the former "Jennison Farm" tract acquired in 1657 by Edmund in the easternmost part of Sudbury.
- Daniel Rice, baptized 1 November 1632 at St. Peter's Church, Berkhamsted, died 10 November 1632 at Berkhamsted.
- Samuel Rice, baptized 12 November 1634 at St. Peter's Church, Berkhamsted, died 25 February 1684/85 at Marlborough, MA, married (1) Elizabeth King 8 November 1655, (2) Mary (Dix) Browne September 1668, and (3) Sarah (White) Hosmer 13 December 1676. Samuel Rice was one of the original inhabitants of Marlborough, having been granted 26 acres (110,000 m^{2}) on 26 November 1660. He served in the Massachusetts Militia in 1675 at Marlborough during King Philip's War.
- Joseph Rice, baptized 13 March 1637/38, at St. Peter's Church, Berkhamsted, died 23 December 1711 at Stow, MA, married (1) Mercy (aka Martha) King 4 May 1658, (2) Mary Beers in 1670, and (3) Sarah (Prescott) Wheeler on 22 February 1677/78. Joseph Rice was one of the original inhabitants of Marlborough, having been granted 22 acres (89,000 m^{2}) on 26 November 1660. Joseph's home was a fortified garrison house during King Philip's War of 1675–78. Joseph Rice served as a representative in the Massachusetts General Court in 1683 and 1698.
- Benjamin Rice, born 31 May 1640 at Sudbury, MA, died 19 December 1713 at Sudbury, MA, married (1) Mary Browne on 2 June 1661, and (2) Mary (Chamberlain) Graves on 1 April 1691. Along with his father and several brothers, Benjamin Rice was an original inhabitant of Marlborough having been granted 24 acres (97,000 m^{2}) on 26 November 1660.

After the death of Thomasine Frost Rice on 13 June 1654 in Sudbury, MA, Edmund Rice married Mercy Brigham (c 1616-1693) on 1 March 1655 in Sudbury, MA. Mercy Brigham was the widow of Thomas Brigham (1603–1653). This marriage began the long association between the Rice and Brigham families. The maiden name of Mercy Brigham, often cited as Hurd, is uncertain due to lack of any primary documentation. Two daughters were born to Edmund and Mercy Rice as follows:

- Lydia Rice, born circa 1657 at Sudbury, MA, died 26 May 1718, married James Hawkins Jr. circa 1678, probably in Boston. Hawkins was a stonemason & bricklayer by trade.
- Ruth Rice, born 29 September 1659 at Marlborough, MA, died 30 March 1742 at Glastonbury, Connecticut, married Capt. Samuel Welles, grandson of Thomas Welles on 20 June 1683

== Edmund Rice's descendants ==
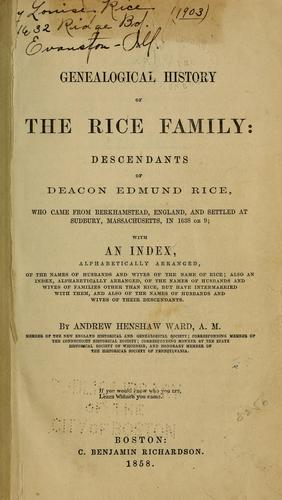
Andrew Henshaw Ward's A Genealogical History of the Rice Family: The Descendants of Deacon Edmund Rice, financed by members of the Rice family and published in 1858.

Descendants of Edmund Rice had been meeting annually at the old Rice homestead in Wayland since 5 September 1851. Documentation of Edmund Rice's descendants began with the 1858 publication of a genealogy of the Rice family by Andrew Henshaw Ward (1784-1864). Its publication was funded by a committee formed at the 1856 annual reunion consisting of five Rice descendants, including: George Merrick Rice (1808-1894), then president of the Worcester Common Council; Edmund Rice (1813-1888) (father of stage producer Edward E. Rice); his uncle, Levi Goodnough (1804-1886), a physician from Sudbury; Anson Rice (1798-1875) (postmaster of Northborough and grandfather of author Wallace Rice); and U.S. Congressman Constantine C. Esty (1824-1912). Despite the difficulties of communication and transportation in the 1850s, Ward was able to document over 6,200 Edmund Rice descendants and spouses, mostly in the New England region.

On 7 October 1903, Edmund Rice descendants were on hand to dedicate the homesite marker of Jonas Rice, a grandson of Edmund and founder of Worcester, Massachusetts. A few years later on 30 August 1912, shortly after the old family homestead in Wayland had been lost by fire, Rice descendants in Massachusetts formally organized the Edmund Rice (1638) Association (ERA), led primarily by Nellie Rice Fiske (1856-1934) a school teacher from Wayland. At that first ERA meeting, Eustace Bond Rice (1871-1938) a professor of music theory at the New England Conservatory who had grown up in the old Rice homestead was elected as the association's first president, and they set out to raise funds to erect the homesite and cemetery monuments.

Beginning in the early 20th century, and partially aided by the compilation and publication of Massachusetts vital records by Franklin Pierce Rice (1852-1919), among others, the ERA undertook the task of building upon Ward's pioneering genealogy by verifying and better documenting Edmund's descendants. In the early 1930s, Alexander Hamilton Rice Jr. (1875-1956) commissioned genealogist Mary Lovering Holman (1868-1947) of the New England Historic Genealogical Society to examine existing information on Edmund Rice and produce an updated genealogy. (Note: Although the genealogy commissioned by Dr. Alexander H. Rice was never published, Mrs. Holman's publication {The American Genealogist 10:133-137 (1934)} of her research findings in the archives of England have been invaluable in understanding Edmund's East Anglian roots; her notes were deposited in the archives of the New England Historic Genealogical Society and later used by the ERA in the published genealogies of 1967 and 1970.) On 10 January 1934, the ERA incorporated under the laws of Massachusetts as the Edmund Rice (1638) Association, Inc. For the 1938 tricentennial of Edmund's immigration to America, the ERA published Elsie Hawes Smith's Edmund Rice and his Family and in the 1940s and 1950s continued correspondence and gatherings of Rice descendants. (Note: Elsie Hawes Smith served as president of the ERA from 1937 to 1939. She was appointed as the historian of the association in 1940 and she served in that capacity until her death on 30 January 1963. She was instrumental in compiling records of thousands of Rice descendants later published by the ERA, and she authored More About Those Rices (1954), a collection of short biographies of Edmund Rice descendants.) Beginning in December 1960, the ERA began publishing a quarterly newsletter to disseminate genealogical and historical information about Edmund Rice, his ancestors and his descendants. By 1968, the ERA had compiled and verified 26,000 descendants of Edmund after publication of their first addendum to Ward's genealogy. During the 1970s and 1980s, the ERA published further genealogical research findings in three additional volumes, and in the mid-1990s, the Association began transferring all of their print records into an electronic format. By 2017, the ERA electronic database of known Edmund Rice descendants into the 14th and 15th generations had exceeded 260,000 individuals. Using data from the ERA electronic database, a total of 2.7 million of Edmund's descendants has been estimated to be in the 12th generation, with a total estimated 4.4 million descendants cumulatively in the first twelve generations. (Note: Data from the ERA database of Edmund's first six generations of descendants (See: ERA six-generation database online) were extrapolated to twelve generations by best fitting a three-variable exponential population growth model to the numbers of descendants per generation in the presumed near-complete totals from the first six generations.)

In 1980, Edmund Rice descendant Corinne M. Snow (1925-2008) wrote a historical fiction novella titled The Deacons based upon the primary historical records of Edmund Rice and his family and Powell's (1963) Puritan Village: The Formation of a New England Town. (Note: Corrine M. Snow (née Corinne Josephine McLaughlin) was a family physician who served as the ERA historian from 1983 to 1994. Her husband, Alexander Wilson Snow (1923-1997) served as president of the ERA in 1988 and 1989, and again in 1994.) The story covers the life of the Rice family in the time period beginning about 1621 in Suffolk, England, through their immigration to Massachusetts in 1638, until the 1713 founding of Worcester by Edmund's grandchildren Jonas, Gershom, and James. It provides an interpretation of the family's experiences in Stanstead, Suffolk, as well as in Berkhamsted, and it offers a purely fictional account of their departure from Southampton Harbor aboard the Confidence to Watertown, Massachusetts. (Note: Many of the original founders of Sudbury who were eventually town mates of the Rice family, including Peter Noyes, Thomas Goodenow, Edmund Goodenow, John Goodenow, Walter Haine, and John Bent, can be found in the passenger manifest of the Confidence, a ship of 200 tons that sailed from Southampton in early Spring of 1638 captained by John Jobson arriving in Boston on 24 April 1638. However, none of the Rice family can be found anywhere on this ship's manifest.) The story further provides an insight into the Rice family's life in Puritan Massachusetts during the political controversies generated as Sudbury and Marlborough were being founded and the experiences of the family during King Philip's War of 1675–78.

== Genetic genealogy ==
Plaque memorializing the death of one and capture of four Rice boys from a flax field in Marlborough (later to become Westborough) with the inscription, "In the Field South of this Spot 8 August 1704 Indians Killed Nahor and Captured Ashur, Adonijah, Silas and Timothy Rice." The monument was placed by the Westborough Historical Society in 1904 on the occasion of the capture bicentennial. It is located near Westborough High School at 42.265712°N 71.617979°W.

Since 2000 with the initial leadership of Robert V. Rice, (Note: Robert Vernon Rice served as president of the ERA from 1998 to 2006.) the ERA has conducted extensive haplotype DNA testing on males known to or believed to have descended from seven sons of Edmund. Enough data has been collected from living male descendants of Edmund's sons to reconstruct Edmund's Y-DNA haplotype. These data have served to support conclusions of Edmund's birth in Suffolk, East Anglia and provide additional evidence to dispel a misleading early 20th-century claim that Edmund Rice was descended from Welsh royalty. The 111 tested (Y-STR) Y-chromosome markers (e.g. DYS391 = 10; DYS392 = 11; DYS393 = 10; DYS426 = 11; DYS447 = 23; DYS454 = 11; DYS455 = 8; YCA-IIa,b = 19, 21) from known descendants of Edmund are consistent with Haplogroup I-M253; this is an exceedingly rare haplogroup among the Welsh but is relatively common among inhabitants of East Anglia.

The genetic testing of Edmund Rice descendants has also served to confirm two different direct male descendant lines in which there had been a change in surname. Data showed direct patrilineal descendants with the surname King, confirming a name change had occurred with Samuel Rice 1667-1713 (aka Lt. Samuel Rice King). Notable direct descendants of Edmund with the surname of King include U.S. Senator William H. King (1863–1949) and his son, U.S. Member of Congress David S. King (1917–2009), and David's daughter Jody, who served as the Director of Peace Corps. Likewise some individuals with the surname of Royce also have been found to have Y-STR genetic markers identical to Edmund Rice, confirming a name change by Alpheus Rice 1787-1871 (aka Capt. Alpheus Royce). A notable direct patrilineal descendant of Edmund with the surname of Royce is George E. Royce (1829-1903), a businessman and state legislator from Vermont. In addition to confirmation of surname changes in the direct patrilineal lines, formerly presumed descendants of Edmund have been ruled out by way of genetic mismatching.

The genetic testing also revealed Y-STR genetic markers of Edmund Rice among some male members of the Mohawk nation who have the surname of Rice. The tested individuals are most probably descended from Silas Rice, one of four Rice boys from two families who were captured during Queen Anne's War by an Indian raid on 8 August 1704 in Marlborough (in the part of town then known as Chauncey that later was renamed as Westborough), Massachusetts, and taken to Kahnawake, Canada, where they were adopted and raised by Mohawk families. They became assimilated as Mohawk, marrying local women of the tribe. Ashur Rice was ransomed after four years and returned to Massachusetts. Actress Alexandrea Kawisenhawe Rice, (b. 1972, Mohawk) of Kahnawake, is a notable descendant of Edmund Rice and his great-grandson Silas. She grew up in Brooklyn, where a Mohawk community formed of families of ironworkers.
