= 1964 Pulitzer Prize =

Awards for journalism and related fields

The following are the Pulitzer Prizes for 1964.

== Journalism awards ==
- Public Service:
  - The St. Petersburg Times, for its aggressive investigation of the Florida Turnpike Authority which disclosed widespread illegal acts and resulted in a major reorganization of the State's road construction program.
- Local General or Spot News Reporting:
  - Norman C. Miller, of The Wall Street Journal, for his comprehensive account of a multimillion-dollar vegetable oil swindle in New Jersey.
- Local Investigative Specialized Reporting:
  - James V. Magee and Albert V. Gaudiosi, reporters and Frederick Meyer, photographer of the Philadelphia Bulletin, for their expose of numbers racket operations with police collusion in South Philadelphia, which resulted in arrests and a cleanup of the police department.
- National Reporting:
  - Merriman Smith of United Press International, for his outstanding coverage of the assassination of President John F. Kennedy.
- International Reporting:
  - Malcolm W. Browne and David Halberstam of the Associated Press and The New York Times, for their individual reporting of the Vietnam War and the overthrow of the Diem regime.
- Editorial Writing:
  - Hazel Brannon Smith of the Lexington Advertiser, for steadfast adherence to her editorial duty in the face of great pressure and opposition.
- Editorial Cartooning:
  - Paul Conrad of The Denver Post, for his editorial cartooning during the past year

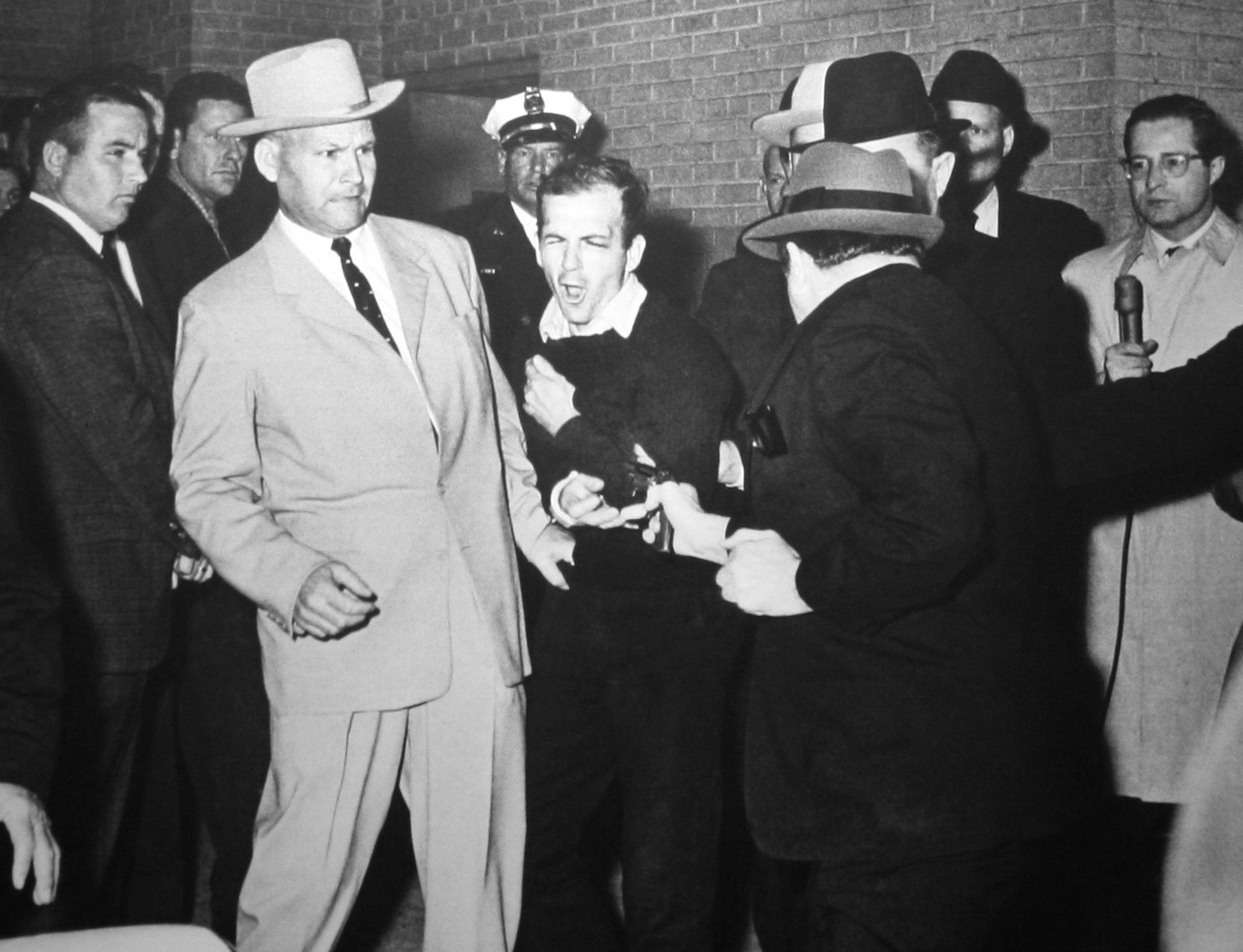
Jack Ruby Shoots Lee Harvey Oswald

- Photography:
  - Robert H. Jackson of the Dallas Times Herald, for his photograph, Jack Ruby Shoots Lee Harvey Oswald. The image depicts the murder of Lee Harvey Oswald by Jack Ruby.
- Special Citation:
  - Gannett Newspapers, for their program, "The Road To Integration", a distinguished example of the use of a newspaper group's resources to complement the work of its individual newspapers.

== Letters, Drama and Music Awards ==
- Fiction:
  - No award given.
- Drama:
  - No award given.
- History:
  - Puritan Village: The Formation of a New England Town by Sumner Chilton Powell (Wesleyan University Press).
- Biography or Autobiography:
  - John Keats by Walter Jackson Bate (Harvard University Press).
- Poetry:
  - At The End Of The Open Road by Louis Simpson (Wesleyan University Press).
- General Nonfiction:
  - Anti-intellectualism in American Life by Richard Hofstadter (Random).
- Music:
  - No award given.
