= Robert V. Rice =

American biochemist (1924–2020)

Robert Vernon Rice
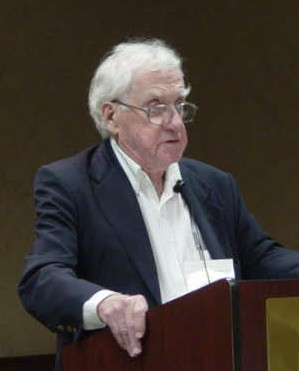
- Dr. Robert V. Rice speaking in Natick, Massachusetts in September 2015
- Born: August 13, 1924; Barre, Massachusetts, U.S.
- Died: February 17, 2020 (aged 95); Falmouth, Massachusetts, U.S.
- Known for: characterization of smooth muscle myosin
- Spouse: Betty Jane (Marts) Rice

Academic background
- Education: University of Wisconsin–Madison
- Doctoral advisor: Mark Arnold Stahmann

Academic work
- Discipline: Biochemistry
- Institutions: Carnegie Mellon University, Marine Biological Laboratory

Robert Vernon Rice (August 13, 1924 – February 17, 2020) was an American biochemist from Carnegie Mellon University and the Marine Biological Laboratory at Woods Hole, Massachusetts primarily known for work in the area of biochemistry and physiology of muscle proteins and neuromuscular interactions.

== Biography ==
Rice was born 13 August 1924 in Barre, Massachusetts, to Laurence Vernon Rice (1891-1964) and Edith (Middlemiss) Rice (1896-1987). Rice is a direct patrilineal descendant of Edmund Rice, an early immigrant to Massachusetts Bay Colony from England. (Note: The descendancy of Robert Vernon Rice from Edmund Rice is as follows: Edmund Rice (1594-1663); Thomas Rice (1626-1681); Jonas Rice (1673-1753); Jonas Rice (1707-1793); Thomas Rice (1741-1822); Thomas Rice (1766-1849); Nathaniel Rice (1792-1851); Carlo Rice (1821-1892); Ernest Everett Rice (1866-1929); Laurence Vernon Rice (1891-1964); Robert Vernon Rice (1924-2020).) Rice married Betty Jane Marts on 13 July 1945 in Phoenix, Arizona, and they divorced in 1977. He died in Falmouth, Massachusetts on February 17, 2020.

== Professional career ==
Rice earned his master's degree in 1952 and his Ph.D. in biochemistry in 1954 at the University of Wisconsin, Madison. He spent most of his academic career from 1955 to 1995 at the department of biological sciences at Carnegie Mellon University in Pittsburgh, Pennsylvania, and served as department head. He was also a scientist-in-residence at the Marine Biological Laboratory at Woods Hole, Massachusetts during the summer months. His research focused on the biochemistry and cellular physiology of muscle contraction and nerve transmission.

In retirement beginning in 1987, Rice was active in the Falmouth Genealogical Society, serving as vice president for programs from 2003 to 2006, and was a member of the New England Historic Genealogical Society in Boston, publishing several papers in its journal, New England Ancestors. He was one of the first five incorporators of Falmouth Community Television in 1991, serving as treasurer and later as president until 1997. He served as the president of the Edmund Rice (1638) Association from 1998-2006, and took up a keen interest in genetic genealogy.

== Selected publications ==
- Rice, R.V., P. Kaesberg, and M.A. Stahmann. (1953). The breaking kof tobacco mosaic virus using a new freeze drying method. Biochimica et Biophysica Acta 11:337-343.
- Rice, R.V. (1961). An electron microscopical examination of configurations of ribonucleic acid and other polyelectrolytes. Biochimica et Biophysica Acta 53(1):29-43.
- Kelly, R.E. and R.V. Rice (1967). Abductin: a rubber-like protein from the inner triangular hinge of Pecten. Science 155(3759):208-210.
- Kelly, R.E. and R.V. Rice (1968). Localization of myosin filaments in smooth muscle. Journal of Cell Biology 37(1):105-116.
- Somlyo, A.P., A.V. Somlyo, C.E. Devine, and R.V. Rice (1971). Aggregation of thick filaments into ribbons in mammalian smooth muscle. Nature 231:243-246.
- Somlyo, A.P., C.E. Devine, A.V. Somlyo, and R.V. Rice. (1973). Filament organization in vertebrate smooth muscle. Philosophical Transactions of the Royal Society of London B. 265:223-229.
- Adelman, W.J., J. Moses, and R.V. Rice. (1977). An anatomical basis for the resistance and capacitance in series with the excitable membrane of the squid giant axon. Journal of Neurocytology 6(6): 621-646.
- Rice, R.V., P.F. Roslansky, N. Pascoe, and S.M. Houghton. (1980). Bridges between microtubules and neurofilaments visualized by stereoelectron microscopy. Journal of Ultrastructure Research 71(3):303-310.
- Hodge, A. J., R.V. Rice, R. Mueller, and W.J. Adelman. (1986). Ordered segmental motion of filopodia in cultured cells. Journal of Cell Biology 103(5):282.
- Rice, R.V., R. Mueller, and W.J. Adelman, Jr. (1990). Tissue culture of squid neurons, glia, and muscle cells. pp. 195–212. In: D.L. Gilbert, W.J. Adelman and M. Arnold (eds.), Squid as Experimental Animals. Plenum Press, New York.
