= Transportation in Connecticut =

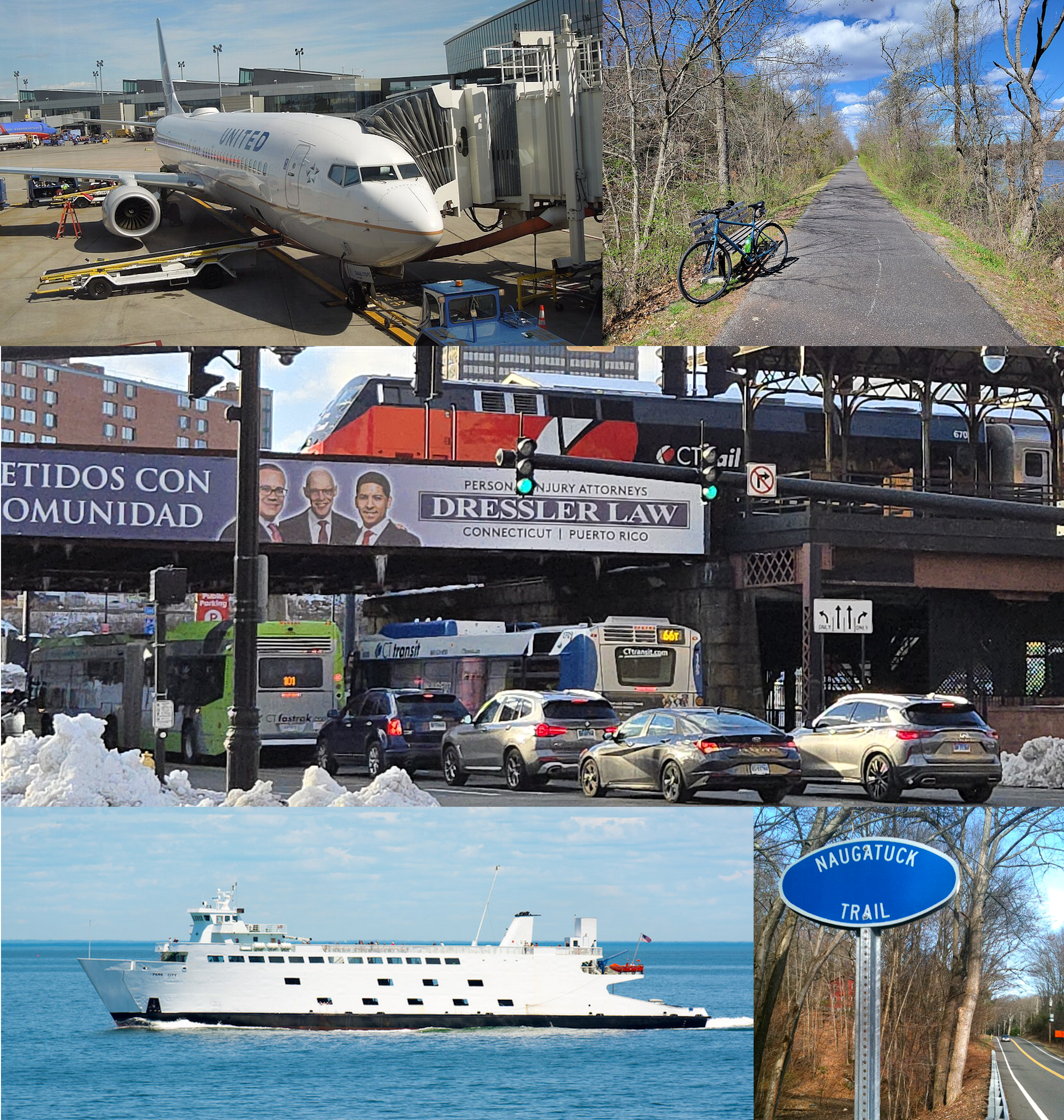
- Left-to-right, top-to-bottom: airplane at Bradley International Airport; bike trail in Suffield; Hartford Line train, private cars, and CT Transit buses in Hartford; ferry in Bridgeport; trailhead in Bethany

Overview
- Transit type: Rapid transit, commuter rail, buses, private automobile, Taxicab, bicycle, pedestrian

Operation
- Operator: Connecticut Department of Transportation

Transportation in Connecticut consists of the different systems of mobility available in the state, including those available publicly, privately, on foot, and by vehicle. The main body of Connecticut's transportation system is in its road network, which provides the infrastructure necessary for private automobiles, truck-based cargo, bus transportation, and limited pedestrian and bicycle access. Aside from local roads and larger routes, interstate highways 84, 91, and 95 pass through Connecticut, carrying substantial vehicle traffic, although the state's parkways, such as the Merritt Parkway, also carry intrastate traffic on similar limited-access roads as well. The road network is complimented by a system of trails dedicated for pedestrians and bicyclists, in some cases taking advantage of previously abandoned railroad lines, known as rail trails. Connecticut still has a number of operational railroad lines, with the Northeast Corridor providing the most extensive passenger rail service in the state. Because of its position roughly half way between New York City and Boston, Connecticut has numerous connections to both cities. Other forms of transportation available include ferry services, notably those going across Long Island Sound, and aviation, with the largest airport being Bradley International, followed by Tweed New Haven.

Transportation in Connecticut has been organized since the colonial era, building upon existing indigenous trails, and has undergone a number of significant changes since the 1600s. Some previously important transportation systems which have since become disused include canals, notably the Farmington Canal, stagecoaches, and trolleys. Although historically managed by a number of different agencies dedicated to individual modes of transportation, transportation in Connecticut overall has been overseen by the Connecticut Department of Transportation since 1969.

== History ==
=== Early Roads ===
Although numerous indigenous trails existed in Connecticut for millennia, the first organized transportation network in Connecticut emerged during the early years of British colonization in the 1630s. In 1633, following existing trails of the Nipmuc and other tribes, John Oldham, an English settler, marked a route between Massachusetts Bay and the Connecticut River Valley, referred to as the Old Connecticut Path. This path was later supplemented in 1635 by the Connecticut Bay Path (also referred to as the "New Way") of John Cable and John Woodstock.

The first legal mandates for road maintenance and construction were implemented in the 1640s and 1650s, although it was not until the 1670s newly constructed roads began to have requirements for their construction. The first of these requirements was a minimum width of six rods, implemented in 1671 during the construction of the Upper Post Route, which forms a section of the Boston Post Road between Boston and New York.

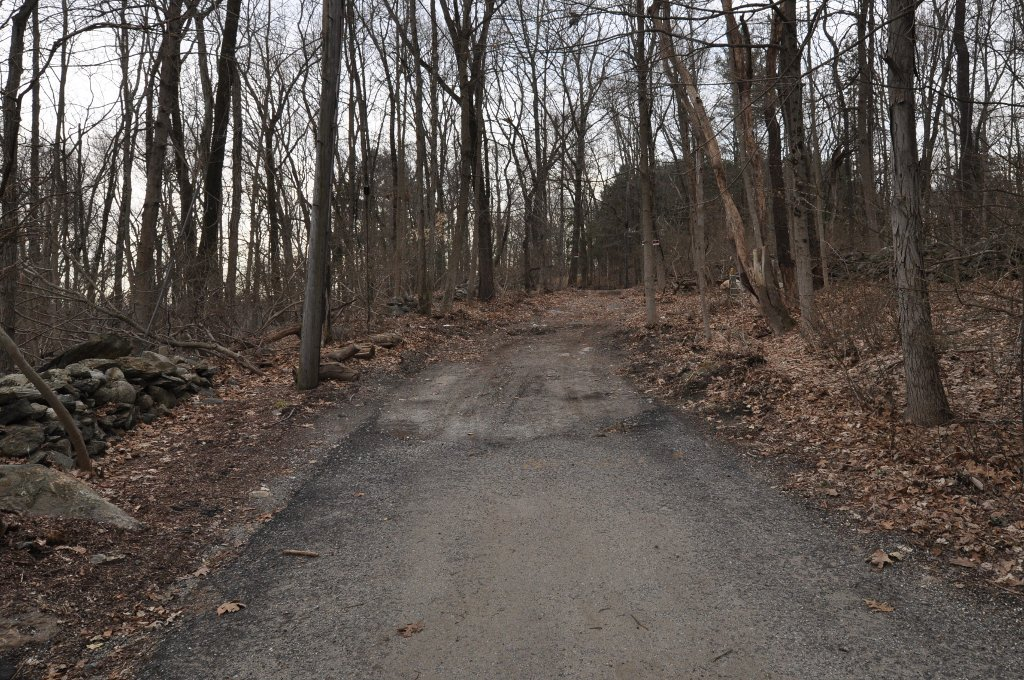
The March Route of Rochambeau's Army: Reservoir Road in Newtown. Few roads surpassed this quality in Connecticut until the mid-1800s.

From the late-1600s through the late-1700s, there was little in the way of significant road building in Connecticut. Road construction was largely conducted by towns themselves, and there was little oversight of the quality of these roads at the colonial- (later state-) level. By the 1790s, in light of poor road quality and a lack of connectivity around the state, state-level construction of turnpikes began, overruling any objections by towns the construction of these roads would have been tasked to otherwise. The first turnpike in Connecticut opened in 1792, linking New London and Norwich through the land of the Mohegan tribe. That same year the first road toll began operation, located on a previously un-tolled section of the Boston Post Road in Greenwich.

=== Early Railroads ===
The first railroad charter in Connecticut was issued in 1832 to the New York, Providence and Boston Railroad. Their services connected Providence and New York City with a two part trip consisting of rail service between Providence and Stonington across the Pawcatuck River, then continued with steamboat service between Stonington and New York City. In 1840, one of the steamboats of the railroad, the Lexington, caught fire while underway from New York, costing 139 lives.

=== Trolleys and Buses ===
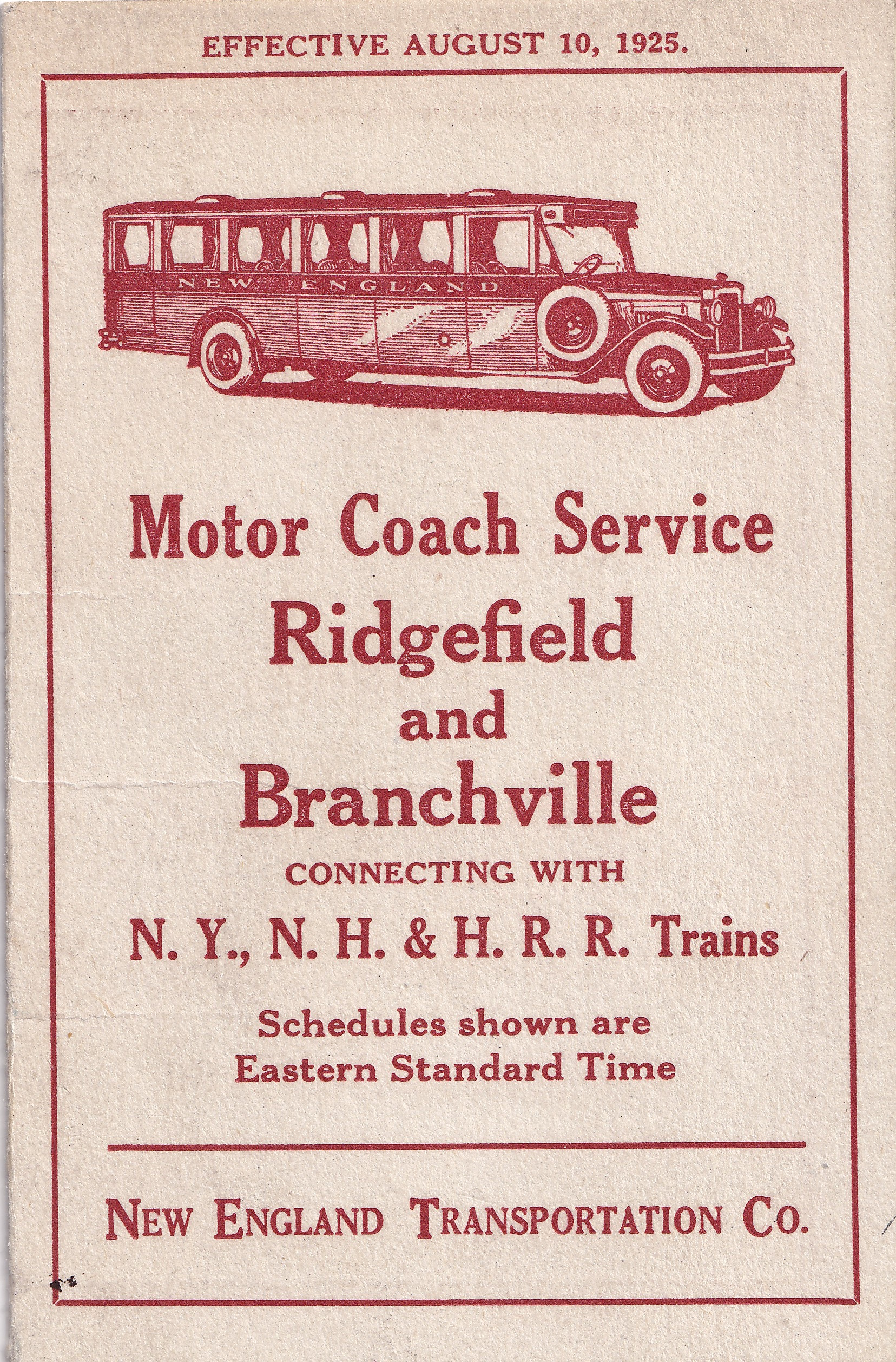
The cover of the first timetable for Ridgefield to Branchville bus services

Trolley service began in Connecticut in the 1850s and 1860s, with the use of horse-drawn cars. An early example of horse-drawn trolley usage in Connecticut was on a line between Hartford and Wethersfield, which began operation in 1863, replacing previous stagecoach services. Through the late-1800s, horse-drawn trolleys were gradually replaced with electrified services, and by 1900 none of Connecticut's trolleys relied upon animal locomotion. A number of trolley lines in the state built during the late-1800s were done so by railroads, or at a smaller scale by public utility companies. The two largest trolley operators in Connecticut in the early-1900s were the Connecticut Railway and Lighting Company (CR&L) and the Connecticut Company (also known as ConnCo). The CR&L started out as the Gas Supply Company, a provider of gas services in the Fairfield area, which was incorporated in 1895. By 1901 however it was ordered to be renamed the Connecticut Railway and Light Company on account of its provision of street railway trolley services. The other major trolley operator, the Connecticut Company, was a subsidiary of the New York, New Haven and Hartford Railroad. Initially the railroad operated trolley lines themselves during the late-1800s and very early-1900s, but it was in 1907 these operations were spun off.

In 1925, owing to declining revenues, the New York, New Haven and Hartford Railroad began to convert some of their more lightly-used passenger rail lines to bus services. The new bus services of the railroad, as well as over-the-road freight, were operated by the New England Transportation Company, a subsidiary. The first bus replacement for rail services in Connecticut occurred on the New York, New Haven and Hartford's branch line from Ridgefield to Branchville, on August 10, 1925.

During the 1930s and 1940s, the number of bus routes in Connecticut rapidly increased. A number, although not all, of the new bus services at this time were from the replacement of existing trolley routes, however. Few trolley routes remained active in Connecticut at the start of the 1940s, although World War II provided a temporary reprieve from their replacement with buses. The last trolley route active in Connecticut was in New Haven, with its final run occurring on September 26, 1948.

In the 1960s, the revenues of Connecticut's bus operators began to decline, leading to a cycle of service cuts and reductions by the 1970s.

=== Since 1969 ===
In 1969 the Connecticut Department of Transportation was formed, consolidating the Department of Highways, Department of Aeronautics, Connecticut Transportation Authority, and the Commission of Steamship Terminals.

== Transit systems ==
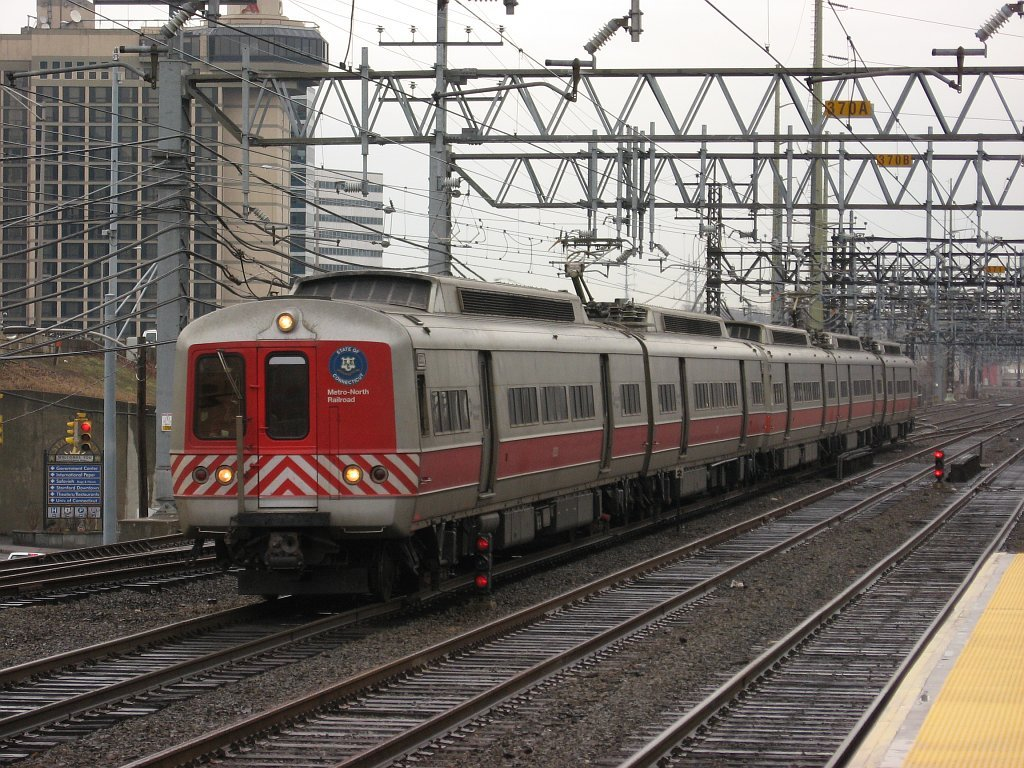
A Metro-North Railroad New Haven Line train at Stamford.

=== Rail ===
Southwestern Connecticut is served by MTA's Metro-North Railroad New Haven Line, providing commuter service to New York City and New Haven, with branches servicing New Canaan, Danbury, and Waterbury. Connecticut lies along Amtrak's Northeast Corridor which features frequent Northeast Regional and Acela Express service. Towns between New Haven and New London are also served by the Shore Line East commuter line. Operation of commuter trains from New Haven to Springfield on Amtrak's New Haven-Springfield Line is under consideration. Amtrak also operates a shuttle service between New Haven and Springfield, Massachusetts, servicing Hartford and other towns on the corridor.

=== Bus ===
Statewide bus service is supplied by Connecticut Transit, owned by the Connecticut Department of Transportation, with smaller municipal authorities providing local service. Bus networks are an important part of the transportation system in Connecticut, especially in urban areas like Hartford, Stamford, Norwalk, Bridgeport and New Haven. The state also operates CTfastrak, a bus rapid transit line linking New Britain and Hartford.

== Roads and freeways ==
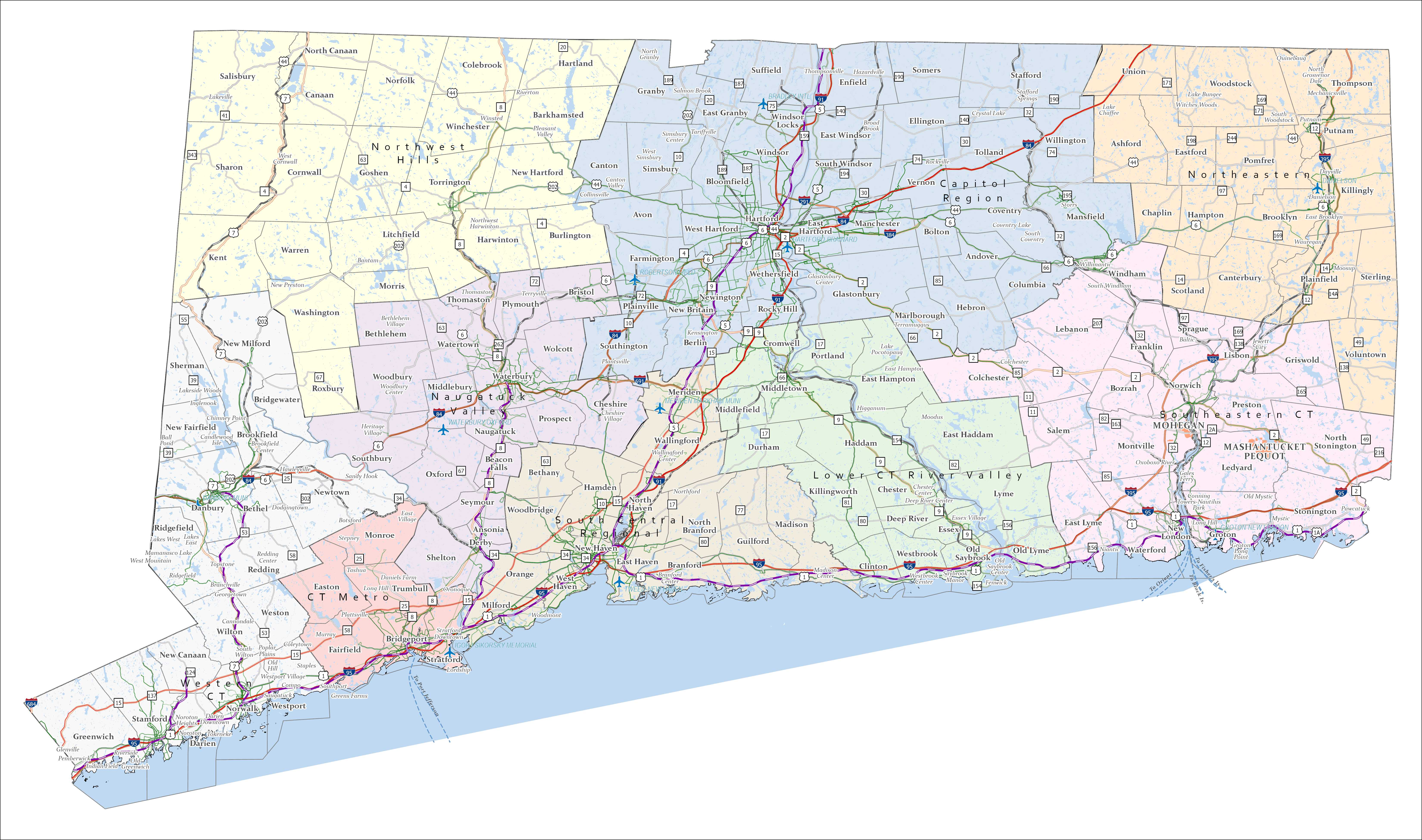
A map of Connecticut featuring highways and major routes alongside airports, buses, ferries, and railways.

The Interstate highways in the state are I-95 (the majority of the Connecticut Turnpike) traveling southwest to northeast along the coast, I-84 traveling southwest to northeast in the center of the state, I-91 traveling south to north in the center of the state, and I-395 (the rest of the Connecticut Turnpike) traveling south to north near the eastern edge of the state. The other major highways in Connecticut are the Merritt Parkway and Wilbur Cross Parkway, which together form Route 15, traveling from the Hutchinson River Parkway in New York State parallel to I-95 before turning north of New Haven and traveling parallel to I-91, finally becoming a surface road in Berlin. Route 15 and I-95 were originally toll roads; they relied on a system of toll plazas at which all traffic stopped and paid fixed tolls. A series of terrible crashes at these plazas eventually contributed to the decision to remove the tolls in 1988. Other major arteries in the state include U.S. Route 7 (US 7) in the west traveling parallel to the NY state line, Route 8 farther east near the industrial city of Waterbury and traveling south to north along the Naugatuck River Valley nearly parallel with US 7, and Route 9 in the east.

Between New Haven and New York City, I-95 is one of the most congested highways in the United States. Many people now drive longer distances to work in the New York City area. This strains the three lanes of traffic capacity, resulting in lengthy rush hour delays. Frequently, the congestion spills over to clog the parallel Merritt Parkway. The state has encouraged traffic reduction schemes, including rail use and ride-sharing.

Connecticut also has a very active bicycling community, with one of the highest rates of bicycling ownership and use in the United States. New Haven's cycling community, organized in a local advocacy group called ElmCityCycling, is particularly active. According to the U.S. Census 2006 American Community Survey, New Haven has the highest percentage of commuters who bicycle to work of any major metropolitan center on the East Coast.

=== Bridges and tunnels ===
The Heroes Tunnel on the Wilbur Cross Parkway is the only tunnel in Connecticut to pass under a natural obstacle, though there are other vehicular tunnels in Hartford and New Haven. Connecticut has many bridges, especially along the coast of Long Island Sound.

=== Rules of the road ===
School zones generally have a speed limit of 25 mph.

Specific rules of the road in Connecticut, especially those that may differ from those of the United States in general, include:

Passengers

- Drivers aged 16 to 17 years are not allowed to have any other passengers besides a driving instructor, parents or legal guardians, or a licensed driver 20 years or older during the first 6 months of having a license.
- After 6 months of holding a driver’s license, drivers aged 16 to 17 years are only permitted to have immediate family members as passengers.

Seat belts

- The driver and front seat passengers are required to wear seat belts.
- Drivers who are 16 or 17 years old and each of their passengers are required to wear seat belts.
- People aged under 8, or who weigh less than 60 pounds, must be in a safety seat designed for their height and weight.

Cell phones

- It is illegal to use a handheld cell phone or other mobile electronic device while driving or when temporarily stopped. Hands-free devices are permitted.
- Drivers aged 16 or 17 years are not permitted to use a cell phone or other electronic device, including hands-free options, while driving unless there is an emergency situation requiring fire or police.

Right-of-way

- Generally, pedestrians have the right-of-way in crosswalks. There are crosswalks at every intersection, even if it is not marked by painted lines.
- Drivers from any direction must stop for a school bus that is stopped with red lights flashing, unless a median or other physical barrier separates their roadways.

Parking

- Parking lights are allowed for parked vehicles only. It is illegal to drive with only parking lights on.
- No-parking zones include:

- Within 25 feet of a stop sign.
- Within 10 feet of a fire hydrant.
- More than one foot from the curb

Curfew

Drivers aged 16 to 17 years are not allowed to drive between 11pm and 5am.

Drunk driving

Driving while intoxicated (DWI) is defined as a blood alcohol content of 0.02% for those under 21 years of age, and 0.08% for older drivers.

Move over

Drivers must move over one lane when it is safe to do so when there is an emergency vehicle, tow truck or road maintenance vehicle with its lights flashing stopped on the road or highway.

Turn on red

A right turn on red is allowed after stopping, unless it is prohibited by a traffic sign. Left turn on red is not permitted.

Horses

Drivers must slow down or stop if necessary when approaching a horse and rider. Blowing the horn when approaching or even passing a horse is illegal.

Studded tires

Studded tires are permitted between November 15 and April 30 unless there are signs or other regulations that do not allow them on certain roadways.

Slower vehicles

Motorists who are driving slowly and have several cars behind them must pull over when it is safe to allow them to pass, or increase speed to the posted speed limit.

Headlights

If wipers are required because of weather conditions, the headlights must be on as well.

Accidents

Any accident involving property damage, injury or death must be reported to the police.

== Port Infrastructure ==
=== Airports ===
Bradley International Airport is located in Windsor Locks, 15 miles (24 km) north of Hartford. Regional air service is provided at Tweed New Haven Regional Airport. Larger civil airports include Danbury Municipal Airport (private planes only) and Waterbury-Oxford Airport in western Connecticut. Sikorsky Memorial Airport is located in Stratford and mostly services cargo, helicopter and private aviation. The Westchester County Airport in Harrison, New York serves much of southwestern Connecticut.

== Current, future and proposed projects ==
The Long Island Sound link is a proposed bridge or tunnel that would link Long Island with either Connecticut or New York across the Long Island Sound. The currently proposed tunnel, however, does not enter Connecticut.

== See also ==
- Plug-in electric vehicles in Connecticut
