= Reeves Tavern =

Historic building in Massachusetts, US

- U.S. National Register of Historic Places
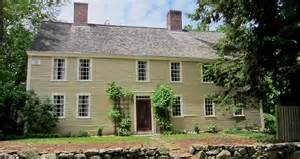

- Location within Massachusetts Location within the United States
- Location: 126 Old Connecticut Path, Wayland, Massachusetts
- Coordinates: 42°21′7″N 71°21′4″W
- Built: 1762
- Architectural style: Colonial
- NRHP reference No.: 16000770
- Added to NRHP: November 15, 2016

Reeves Tavern is a historic colonial tavern (now a private residence) in Wayland, Massachusetts. Built in 1762–63, it is one of the town's best preserved examples of an early tavern. It was listed on the National Register of Historic Places in 2016.

== Description and history ==
Reeves Tavern is located southeast of Wayland center, in a suburban residential area. The property includes a house and a barn, set on over 2 acres (0.81 ha) on the north side of Old Connecticut Path, between Forest Hill and Shaw Roads, with an old stone wall and hemlock hedge lining the front of the property. The house is a 2 1/2-story wood-frame structure, with a gable roof, two chimneys, clapboarded exterior, and stone foundation. Its front facade is six bays wide, the entrance set in the center-left bay. The interior retains original woodwork and period fireplaces. The barn, located to the left of the house, dates to the 19th century.

The oldest portion of the house is the rightmost pair of bays. It was probably built sometime before 1720 by Matthew Hussey (or Hasey, spellings vary), with the remainder of the main block added in 1762-63 by Jacob Reeves. Reeves is documented as operating a tavern on the premises no later than 1764, and was one of the signatories to a 1780 petition to the state for the separation of Wayland from Sudbury. In 1774, Reeves hosted John Adams. The property was sold out of the Reeves family in 1906.

== See also ==
- National Register of Historic Places listings in Middlesex County, Massachusetts
