= Listed buildings in Stanstead, Suffolk =

Civil Parish in Suffolk, England

Stanstead is a village and civil parish in the Babergh District of Suffolk, England. It contains 19 listed buildings that are recorded in the National Heritage List for England. Of these two are grade II* and 17 are grade II.

This list is based on the information retrieved online from Historic England.

== Key ==
Grade	Criteria
I	Buildings that are of exceptional interest
II*	Particularly important buildings of more than special interest
II	Buildings that are of special interest

== Listing ==
Name	Grade	Location	Type	Completed (Note: The date given is the date used by Historic England as significant for the initial building or that of an important part in the structure's description.)	Date designated	Grid ref. (Note: The grid reference is based on the British national grid reference system, sometimes known as OSGB36, used by the Ordnance Survey.) Geo-coordinates	Notes	Entry number (Note: The "List Entry Number" is a unique number assigned to each listed building and scheduled monument by Historic England.)	Image	Wikidata
16 and 17, Lower Street	II	16 and 17, Lower Street			9 February 1978	TL8403748724; 52°06′22″N 0°41′09″E		1351892	Upload Photo	Q26634955
21-23, Lower Street	II	21-23, Lower Street			9 February 1978	TL8444148532; 52°06′16″N 0°41′30″E		1033522	Upload Photo	Q26285006
Barn to the Oaklands	II	Lower Street			10 January 1953	TL8436148584; 52°06′17″N 0°41′26″E		1033524	Upload Photo	Q26285007
Mill Farmhouse	II	Lower Street			9 February 1978	TL8486447969; 52°05′57″N 0°41′51″E		1033521	Upload Photo	Q26285005
Potash House	II	Lower Street			9 February 1978	TL8427848631; 52°06′19″N 0°41′22″E		1033525	Upload Photo	Q26285008
Sparrows Farmhouse	II	Lower Street			9 February 1978	TL8413048734; 52°06′23″N 0°41′14″E		1351893	Upload Photo	Q26634956
The Oaklands	II*	Lower Street	architectural structure		10 January 1953	TL8435148590; 52°06′18″N 0°41′25″E		1033523	The Oaklands More images	Q17532712
White Hart Inn	II	Lower Street			9 February 1978	TL8431048629; 52°06′19″N 0°41′23″E		1033526	Upload Photo	Q26285009
Barn at Barnfield	II	Upper Street			9 February 1978	TL8435849876; 52°06′59″N 0°41′28″E		1351895	Upload Photo	Q26634958
Barnfield Cottage	II	Upper Street			9 February 1978	TL8434550007; 52°07′04″N 0°41′28″E		1199890	Upload Photo	Q26495743
Bretteston Hall	II	Upper Street			9 February 1978	TL8442149794; 52°06′57″N 0°41′31″E		1199902	Upload Photo	Q26495753
Church of St James	II*	Upper Street	church building		23 March 1961	TL8433949342; 52°06′42″N 0°41′26″E		1033528	Church of St James More images	Q17532722
Fern Cottage	II	Upper Street			9 February 1978	TL8432749553; 52°06′49″N 0°41′26″E		1199865	Upload Photo	Q26495720
Grafton	II	Upper Street			9 February 1978	TL8436649641; 52°06′52″N 0°41′28″E		1033530	Upload Photo	Q26285012
Maltings	II	Upper Street			9 February 1978	TL8440250107; 52°07′07″N 0°41′31″E		1351896	Upload Photo	Q26634959
Old Mill House	II	Upper Street			9 February 1978	TL8438649096; 52°06′34″N 0°41′28″E		1033527	Upload Photo	Q26285010
Shelley	II	Upper Street			9 February 1978	TL8434249666; 52°06′52″N 0°41′27″E		1033529	Upload Photo	Q26285011
Spring Hall	II	Upper Street			9 February 1978	TL8445450394; 52°07′16″N 0°41′34″E		1033531	Upload Photo	Q26285013
Stanstead Hall	II	Upper Street			9 February 1978	TL8438749221; 52°06′38″N 0°41′29″E		1351894	Upload Photo	Q26634957

== See also ==
- Grade I listed buildings in Suffolk
- Grade II* listed buildings in Suffolk

== Sources ==
- Bettely, James; Pevsner, Nikolaus (2015) [1961], Suffolk: West, The Buildings of England, New Haven and London: Yale University Press, ISBN 978-0-300-19655-9
