= Franklin Pierce Rice =

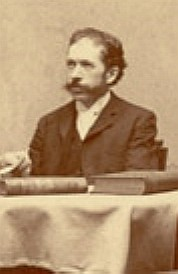
- Rice in 1892
- Born: July 29, 1852; Marlborough, Massachusetts
- Died: January 3, 1919 (aged 66); Worcester, Massachusetts, United States
- Known for: Preservation of historical records from Massachusetts & founding of Worcester Historical Museum

Franklin Pierce Rice (1852–1919) was a self-taught printer and publisher who transcribed and printed and preserved vital records from Massachusetts and was a co-founder of the Worcester Society of Antiquity.

== Early life and family ==
Franklin Pierce Rice was born 29 July 1852 in Marlborough, Massachusetts as the only son of Minot Rice and Mary Berry (Felton) Rice. He received his elementary education from his mother, and did not enter public school until he was eleven years old. After completion of his preparatory studies, he intended to enter the medical profession so he began the study of chemistry, anatomy and physiology; however he never completed these studies. He turned to writing and publishing the public records of Massachusetts as a profession. He was never married.

== Career in publishing ==
In 1871 Rice purchased his first printing press. He was self-educated as a printer not apprenticing in any other shop. By himself and on his own press he set out to compile, preserve and print the vital records, many from colonial times, from the towns of Worcester County. The task of compiling and editing of records was continued by the Worcester Society of Antiquity, which was co-founded by Rice in 1875. Beginning in 1902, the Massachusetts Vital Records Act authorized the printing of the vital records prior to 1850 in all Massachusetts. By the time of the repeal of the Vital Records Act in 1918, Rice had compiled and published the vital records of more than 30 towns in Worcester County. He was also a contributing author to several newspapers and in encyclopedias on historical and antiquarian topics. The movement begun by Rice to publish and preserve Massachusetts public records was an important factor in fostering interest in genealogy and historic preservation in New England.

In addition to his work to found the Worcester Society of Antiquity (later to become the Worcester Historical Museum), Rice was elected a member of the American Antiquarian Society in 1906. Rice was also a member of the Colonial Society of Massachusetts, the Worcester Natural History Society (serving as director from 1894 to 1909), and the Bunker Hill Monument Association. Rice died on 3 January 1919 in Worcester, Massachusetts.

== Selected publications ==
- Rice, F.P. (ed.) (1882). Records of the Court of General Sessions of the Peace for Worcester, Massachusetts 1731-1737. Worcester Society of Antiquity, Worcester, MA. 197pp.
- Rice, F.P. (1883). Reminiscences of Reverend George Allen of Worcester. Putnam and Davis Publishers, Worcester, MA 127pp.
- Rice, F.P. (1885). An Account of the Discovery of a Mastodon's Remains in Northborough, Worcester County, Massachusetts. Worcester Natural History Society, Worcester, MA. 8pp.
- Rice, F.P. (1893). Dictionary of Worcester Massachusetts and Vicinity. F.S. Blanchard & Company, Worcester, MA. 135pp.
- Rice, F.P. (1899). The Worcester of Eighteen Hundred and Ninety Eight:Fifty Years a City. F.S. Blanchard & Company, Worcester, MA. 809pp.
- Rice, F.P. (compiler) (1907). Vital Records of the Town of Sutton, Massachusetts: To the End of the Year 1849. F. P. Rice. Publisher, Worcester, MA. 476pp.

== Genealogy ==
Franklin Pierce Rice was a direct patrilineal descendant of Edmund Rice, an English immigrant to Massachusetts Bay Colony, as follows:

- Franklin Pierce Rice, son of
  - Minot Rice (1823 – ?), son of
    - Abel Rice (1791 – 1855), son of
    - Jabez Rice (1746 – 1809), son of
    - Jabez Rice (1702 – 1783), son of
      - Caleb Rice (1666 – 1738), son of
      - Joseph Rice (1638 – 1711), son of
        - Edmund Rice (1594 – 1663)
