= George E. Royce =

American politician

George Edmund Royce
- George Edmund Royce ca1900

Member of the Vermont Senate from the Rutland district
- In office 1902 – 5 March 1903 (died in office)

Personal details
- Born: January 1, 1829 Orwell, Vermont
- Died: March 5, 1903 (aged 74) Rutland, Vermont
- Party: Democratic
- Spouse(s): Miriam E. (Brewer) Royce (m. 1857; d. 1866); Martha A. (Brewer) Royce (m. 1866); Ellen C. (White) Royce (m. 1875)
- Children: Fannie E.(Royce) Drowne (b. 1858); George B. Royce (b. 1860); Julia M. Royce (b. 1862, died young); Kate M. (Royce) Hyde (b. 1864); Jane M. Royce (b. 1867); Robert S. Royce (1869-1890); Julia I. (Royce) Dowlin (1871-1903);Edmund W. Royce (b. 1877); Thomas J. Royce (b. 1879); Pauline M. Royce (b. 1881); Albert A. Royce (b. 1883); Henry Moore Royce (b. 1886); Richard Howard Royce; (b. 1889); John Carver Royce (1893-1898); Helen Caroline Royce (b. 1897)
- Education: Troy Conference Academy
- Profession: Businessman, banker, state legislator

George Edmund Royce (January 1, 1829 – March 5, 1903) was an American businessman from Rutland, Vermont who was prominent in the quarrying and building stone industry. He was also a banker, jointly founding the Baxter National Bank of Rutland, and was a member of the Vermont State Senate from 1902 to his death in 1903.

== Biography ==
George Edmund Royce was born in Orwell, Vermont on 1 January 1829 to Alpheus Royce and Harriet (Moore) Royce. He attended public schools in the vicinity of Orwell, and attended two years of college at Troy Conference Academy. In 1850, he moved to New York City and engaged in a number of business concerns, returning to Vermont in 1864 and purchasing hundreds of acres of land near Rutland, Vermont with funds from his work in New York. In 1866, Royce organized the Steam-Stone Cutter Company along with W.T. Nichols, employing the steam powered stone cutter recently invented by George J. Wardwell, thus pioneering the industrialization of marble building stone quarrying in Vermont. Royce was also the prime investor in the establishment of the True Blue Marble Company near West Rutland in 1884. In addition to marble quarrying, he was involved with Horace Henry Baxter and Trenor W. Park in the establishment of the Baxter National Bank in Rutland, serving as a founding director from 1870 until his death. He was also a director of the United States Tube Company in Buffalo, New York.

In 1883, Royce was elected as a selectman in Rutland, and served until 1886. He led the establishment of the water works system of Rutland in the late 1880s, and served as the town's first water commissioner. Royce also served as a founding director of the City Hospital of Rutland.

Royce was very active in Democratic Party politics in Vermont as was influential in the state. He was a state delegate to the 1900 Democratic National Convention, and was a staunch supporter of William Jennings Bryan as the party nominee. Rice was elected to the Vermont Senate in the elections of 1902, and he served until his death on 5 March 1903.

== Family relations ==
Rice was a direct descendant of Edmund Rice an early immigrant to Massachusetts Bay Colony as follows:

- George Edmund Royce, son of

- Alpheus Rice (aka Capt. Alpheus Royce) (1787-1871), son of
- Jonas Rice (1756-1839), son of
- Adonijah Rice (1717-1802), son of

- Jonas Rice (1672-1753), son of
- Thomas Rice (1621-1681), son of

- Edmund Rice (ca1594-1663)

Rice's father Captain Alpheus Royce (who was born Alpheus Rice and changed his name in middle age) led a company of Vermont militia in the War of 1812 at the Battle of Plattsburgh. His grandfather Jonas was a lieutenant in the Revolutionary War, serving at Valley Forge, the Battle of Trenton and the Battle of Princeton. His great grandfather Adonijah Rice, was a member of Rogers' Rangers during the French and Indian War, and his great, great grandfather Jonas Rice was the original European settler of Worcester, Massachusetts.

Party political offices
Preceded by James B. Mattocks	Democratic nominee for Vermont State Treasurer; 1878	Succeeded by James Williams
