= Thomas Rice (Massachusetts politician, born 1654) =

Thomas Rice (June 30, 1654 – 1747) was a member of the Great and General Court of Massachusetts representing Marlborough in 1715 and 1716 and was a founder of Westborough, Massachusetts, on 18 November 1717, and a selectman for the town in 1718 and 1727.

== Personal background ==
Plaque memorializing the death of one and capture of four Rice boys from a flax field with the inscription, "In the Field South of this Spot August 8, 1704 Indians Killed Nahor and Captured Ashur, Adonijah, Silas and Timothy Rice." Thomas Rice's sons included Ashur and Adonijah. The other children were sons of Thomas Rice's cousin Edmund Rice, residing nearby. The monument is located in Westborough, Massachusetts, near Westborough High School at global coordinates 42.265712°N 71.617979°W.

Thomas Rice was born on June 30, 1654, to Thomas Rice and Mary (King) Rice in Sudbury, Massachusetts. He was the grandson of Edmund Rice, a 1638 immigrant from England and founder of Sudbury. Rice married Anna Rice, daughter of Deacon Edward Rice and Agnes Bent, on January 10, 1681, at Marlborough, Massachusetts, and they had 14 children. Rice's brother Jonas was an early resident and founder of Worcester.

Rice was among the first to settle prior to 1675 in the southwestern portion of Marlborough known as Chauncey, the portion of Marlborough that later became Westborough. Rice's home was a fortified garrison house that was used by area settlers for refuge from Indian raids during King Philip's War 1675-1676. During Queen Anne's War in 1704, two of Rice's sons, Adonijah and Ashur, were abducted from a flax field in Marlborough by Mohawk raiders from Canada. He was one of the founding members of the town on 18 November 1717, and one of the original members of the Congregational Church at Westborough begun by Ebenezer Parkman in 1724. He represented the Town of Marlborough in the Great and General Court of Massachusetts, the colonial legislature in Boston in 1715 and 1716. And he served as a selectman in Westborough in the years 1718 and 1727. Thomas Rice died in 1747, with the Boston Gazette claiming he died at age 94.
