= Kahnawake surnames =

Surnames of the Mohawks of Kahnawà:ke

The Mohawk Nation reserve of Kahnawake, south of Montreal, Quebec, Canada, includes residents with surnames of Mohawk, French, Scots and English ancestry, reflecting its multicultural history. This included the adoption of European children into the community, as well as intermarriage with local colonial settlers over the life of the early village. Located along the St. Lawrence River south of the city of Montréal on the shores of the St-Louis rapids, it dates to 1667 as a Jesuit settlement called Mission Saint-François-Xavier du Sault-Saint-Louis. The original mission was located in what is now La Prairie and was called Kentake by its first Oneida settlers.

During the 1670s, the Catholic mission grew as many Mohawk families arrived; they rapidly outnumbered the more than twenty other Native groups that were represented there. Following four displacements, the mission was moved to its present-day location in 1716, where it was called Kahnawake, or "at the rapids". In the Mohawk language, Kahnawake residents refer to themselves by the autonym Kahnawakehro:non. Some families from here were co-founders of Akwesasne upriver, now known also as the St. Regis Reservation, as its territory extends across the St. Lawrence River into New York State. Their descendants also moved to the present-day reserve of Kanesatake.

The origins of some of Kahnawake's European family names were first published by Father Forbes in 1899. Below is detailed history of Kahnawake's most common surnames of European / North American origin.

Beauvais: the first Beauvais was André Karhaton, who married Marie-Anne Kahenratas before 1743. He was a young man from the Beauvais family of La Prairie who was adopted and raised in Kahnawake.

Canadien: this name comes from the wife of Charles Tehosteroton, granddaughter of Big John Canadian, whose father is unknown.

Curotte: this name is based on the French name Cureau or Curot. Pierre Curotte Taronhiorens married Marie-Joseph Karenhatirontha before 1748. Pierre's origins are vague, but he may have been a stolen or illegitimate child.

D'Ailleboust: this name originates from Ignace Soteriioskon dit D'Ailleboust, born in about 1733 (and died in 1797) from the marriage of Catherine Kawennakaion and La Prairie resident Antoine D'Ailleboust, sieur de Coulogne et de Mantet. The name is now spelled Diabo.

Several D'AiIlleboust from Montreal, Chateauguay and surrounding areas owned native slaves known as "panis", a term believed by historians from be a corruption of Panismahas, a sub-group of the Pawnee.

De La Ronde: this name is from Paul Niioherasha, son of voyageur Charles-François Denys de la Ronde Thibaudière and Magdeleine Pemadjisoanokwe from Kanesatake. Their own ancestors include Simon and Jeanne Dubreuil, who arrived in Canada in 1651. The name is now spelled Delaronde or Laronde.

De Lorimier: Claude-Nicolas-Guillaume de Lorimier was a French-Canadian officer and wealthy land-owner in Kahnawake. Born in Lachine in 1744, he commanded Native troops during the Seven Years' War and the American Revolution. In 1783, he married Marie-Louise Schuyler, an Iroquois (likely Mohawk) woman, and they moved to Kahnawake. In 1801, he married Anne Skaouennetsi (Iroquois, likely Mohawk), with whom he had four children, including Antoine-George de Lorimier. He died in Kahnawake in 1825. Before and after the 1837-1838 Lower Canada Rebellion, there was controversy among the natives who wanted De Lorimier and other Europeans out of the community. His sons sold their properties and made lives elsewhere. (Although not descendants, the modern-day Delormier and Dell families adopted the name in the early twentieth century to abide by Canadian legislation's forcing people to have a "Canadian" family name.)

Delisle: this name is from Jacques Tewennitashen, born in about 1746 and deceased in 1826. According to tradition, he was the son of an English prisoner brought to Kahnawake. In 1766, he married Catherine Skawenniooha, from Kahnawake.

Giasson: Ignace Giasson married Marie-Louise de Sacquespée, daughter of Amable-Benoît de Sacquespée and Marie-Angélique d' Aillesboust des Musseaux in January 1792, in Montréal. They had two boys: Ignace Jr. married Marie Pollard, a resident of Châteauguay, and lived there; Charles-Gédéon married Agathe McComber, a daughter of Kahnawake resident Jarvis McComber through his first wife, Charlotte Tsionnonna. Marie-Angélique, daughter of Ignace (senior), became the second wife of Jarvis McComber in 1812.

Hill: Jacob Hill, later named Kannetakon, was brought back as a captive by Kahnawake men following an expedition to Schenectady. He married Marie Anastasie Konkaientha in 1766. Some of his descendants took the surname JACOB.

La Saussaye: Charles aka Wanoronk appears in the registries in 1783. He appears to be a Huron from Lorette, and son of Oskwesannete and Marie.

Mailloux: Amable Mailloux married French-Canadian Félicité Rollin in Châteauguay in 1793. Their three sons, François-Xavier Tiorateken, Louis Onokohte and Pierre Ohahakehte, were brought up by Kahnawake resident Antoine Otes dit Zacharie and married local Native women. The name is now spelled Mayo or Myiow.

McComber: This name is from Jarvis (Gervais, Gervase) McComber / Macomber, son of Constant Macomber and Mary Earle. McComber was born in Massachusetts, to a Protestant family that had lived there since the early 1600's and could trace its descent from, among others, Mayflower passengers Francis Cook and Richard Warren. His father Constant had fought as a minuteman against the British in the American War of Independence. In about 1796, at sixteen years of age, McComber moved on his own from the United States to Kahnawake, where was hired by Thomas Arakwente, a controversial Mohawk Chief and powerful fur trader, who later adopted him. Following several fur trading expeditions with Arakwente to the Great Lakes, McComber refused to go back to his family and married Arakwente's daughter. In 1805, he converted to Catholicism. Fluent in English, French and Iroquois, he himself became an important trader and landowner. He was commissioned in 1813 as a Lieutenant and interpreter in the Indian Department under Sir John Johnson, serving in a number engagements, including in command of a company of Mowhawk Warriors at the Battles of Beaver Dams and Chateauguay. He married three times. His first wife was Charlotte Tsionnonna; his second wife was Marie-Angélique Giasson, whom he married in 1812; he married a third time in 1842 to a woman by the name of Hypolite. He died in 1866 at the age of ninety-five, having fathered twenty-eight children.

McGregor: Pierre Anatorenha McGregor was taken captive with his sister Marie. They were among the many captives brought to Montreal and Kahanawake. He and his sister were adopted by a Mohawk family in Kahnawake.

Taylor, Norton (to be updated and amended)

Montour: Andre Satsienhowane He Makes a Big Fire born 1678 died 1776 married Marie Anne Kaherine Corn Stack Kaherine died 1765. A Captain Andrew Montour who was Huron French employed by Virginia as an interpreter serving in the Braddock Expedition of 1755 carried the Montour name

Merry or Murray: Trueman aka Sotsitsionwane was the son of Ephraim and Diane Merry from Boston. He was baptized as a Catholic under the name of Pierre in 1805. He married Marie Saiorio in 1805, Marie Tikos in 1838, and Marie Tsiawenhatie in 1840.

Monique: Louis Onwaskannha was born in 1760, and died in 1810. He married Dorothee Kariwaienhne. He was a Huron from the village of Jeunne-Lorrette (modern-day Wendake) who moved to Kahnawake in the early nineteenth century.

Nicholas-Nicolas: Tekanatokin became Nicholas. It appears in the 1901 census:Francois-Xavier Nicolas, 46 years old, Louise, 44, wife. In the 1891 census: Xavier Tekanatoken, 28, Monique, 25, wife.

-In the 1881 census: Xavier Tekanatoken, 20. Also, In the 1901 census: Abraham Tekanatoken, 45 and his brother and wife: Jean Nicolas (brother of Abraham), 43, Marguerite, 41, wife, basket maker. Then in the 1891 census: Jean Tekanatoken, 34, Agnes, 29.

Another example from the same family: In the 1901 census: Marianne Nicolas, 73, widow, and her children: Wattie, 23, Anastasie, 21, Simon, 26, Michel, 24, woodcutter.

In the 1891 census: Marie Anne Tekanatoken, 61, widow, Pierre, 26, Wattie, 23, Anastasie, 21, Simon, 19, Michel, 16.

in the 1881 census: Nicolas Tekanatokin, 59, Marie Anne Katitsak, 48, Jean, 23, Jn-Bte, 21, Xavier, 19, Anen, 29, Pierre, 17, Martine, 14, Anastasie, 12, Simon, 10, Michel, 5, Abraham, 27, Louise, 20, Anen, 3, Rachel, 11/12 months.

Philippe: Pierre Sonorese Philippe was born about 1733 and died in 1786. He married Anna Atsiaha around 1755. Not much is known of him aside from the possibility that he may have been from the United States. The name is now spelled Philip.

Rice: Silas and Timothy Rice, English colonist children, were taken captive on August 8, 1704 from Marlborough (now Westborough), Massachusetts during a French-Indian raid of Queen Anne's War. The captives were taken to Kahnawake, where both the young boys were adopted by Mohawk families and baptized as Catholics. Silas, nine years old when he arrived, was given the Mohawk name, Thanhohorens and the Catholic name of Jacques. He died in 1779 at the age of 90. Timothy, seven years old when he arrived, was named Oseronhokion, and later became a chief. Both assimilated and married local Mohawk women. Their cousins Ashur and Adonijah Rice, sons of Thomas Rice, were captured at the same time from the same flax field. They were also brought to Kahnawake and adopted by local families. Adonijah was eight years old when he was adopted; he grew up and married in Kahnawake. His brother Ashur was 10 and the firstborn son; he was ransomed after four years by his father and returned to Massachusetts.

Simon: In the 1901 census they appear as: Michel Simon, 55(age), Anne, 47, wife, basket (basket crafter), -In the 1891 census, he was also Michel Simon, 40, farm helper, Anne, 39. In the previous 1881 census he was Michel Anaietha, 31, Onwari(Anne Mary) Kahentawaks, 28.

Another one also appears in the 1901 census: Pierre Simon, 48, Marie, 46, wife. In the 1891 census they were Pierre Simon, 37, Cecile, 32, wife.

-In the 1881 census: they were: Simon Anaietha, 27, Cecile Konwennaronke, 21. The name potentially modified by the Priests appears in different formulas through the parish registers and censuses: Simon-Anaietha- Anayehta-Ana Yetta-Nayetta- Onehieta-Oninyetta.

Stacey: John Aionwatha Stacey, an English Protestant boy, was taken captive near Albany in about 1755 during the Seven Years' War. Stacey was brought to Kahnawake with Jacob Hill and adopted by the Mohawk. Married successively to Agnes Karakwannentha, Louise Daudelin in 1784, and Marie Angélique D'Ailleboust des Musseaux in 1769, he had a total of fourteen children.

Tarbell: John and Zachary Tarbell, ethnic English brothers, were taken captive as boys along with their older sister Sarah in a French-Abenaki raid from Groton, Massachusetts in June 1707 during Queen Anne's War. After being brought to Kahnawake, the boys were adopted into Mohawk families and converted to Catholicism; they were also given Mohawk names. (Sarah was redeemed by a French family and converted to Catholicism. Under the name of Marguerite, in 1708 she joined the Congregation of Notre Dame.) The boys as adults married daughters of Mohawk chiefs, had children, worked as fur traders, and became chiefs themselves. In the 1750s, they led about 30 families upriver to found the new community of Akwesasne. In 1739 the brothers visited family in New England for the first time since capture. With these two brothers and their wives as ancestors, Tarbell descendants have been numerous in both Kahnewake and Akwesasne, with descendants by this surname in the 21st century.

Williams: Eunice Williams, the daughter of minister John Williams, was captured during the raid on Deerfield, Massachusetts, on the night of 28 February 1704. Eunice was seven years old at the time. Captives were taken to Montreal and the Mohawk village of Kahnawake. She was adopted by a Mohawk family, converted to Catholicism and renamed Marguerite (as well as receiving the Mohawk name of Kanenstenhawi). She married Francois, a Mohawk within the Kahnawake community. Eunice became thoroughly assimilated as a Mohawk and refused to leave the community to return to New England life. She visited her brother Stephen Williams more than once in Massachusetts, but lived in Kahnawake the remainder of her life. She died on 26 November 1785 at the age of 89. The name in Kahnawake and Kanesatake descends from her and her children.

Zacharie: Otes Zacharie was a retired Huron chief married to a Kahnawake woman called Charlotte. They had two sons, Antoine Otes aka Aientas aka Tekaronhonte, and Michel Kaniatariio.
