= Connecticut Department of Transportation =

Government agency in Connecticut

- Seal

- Logo

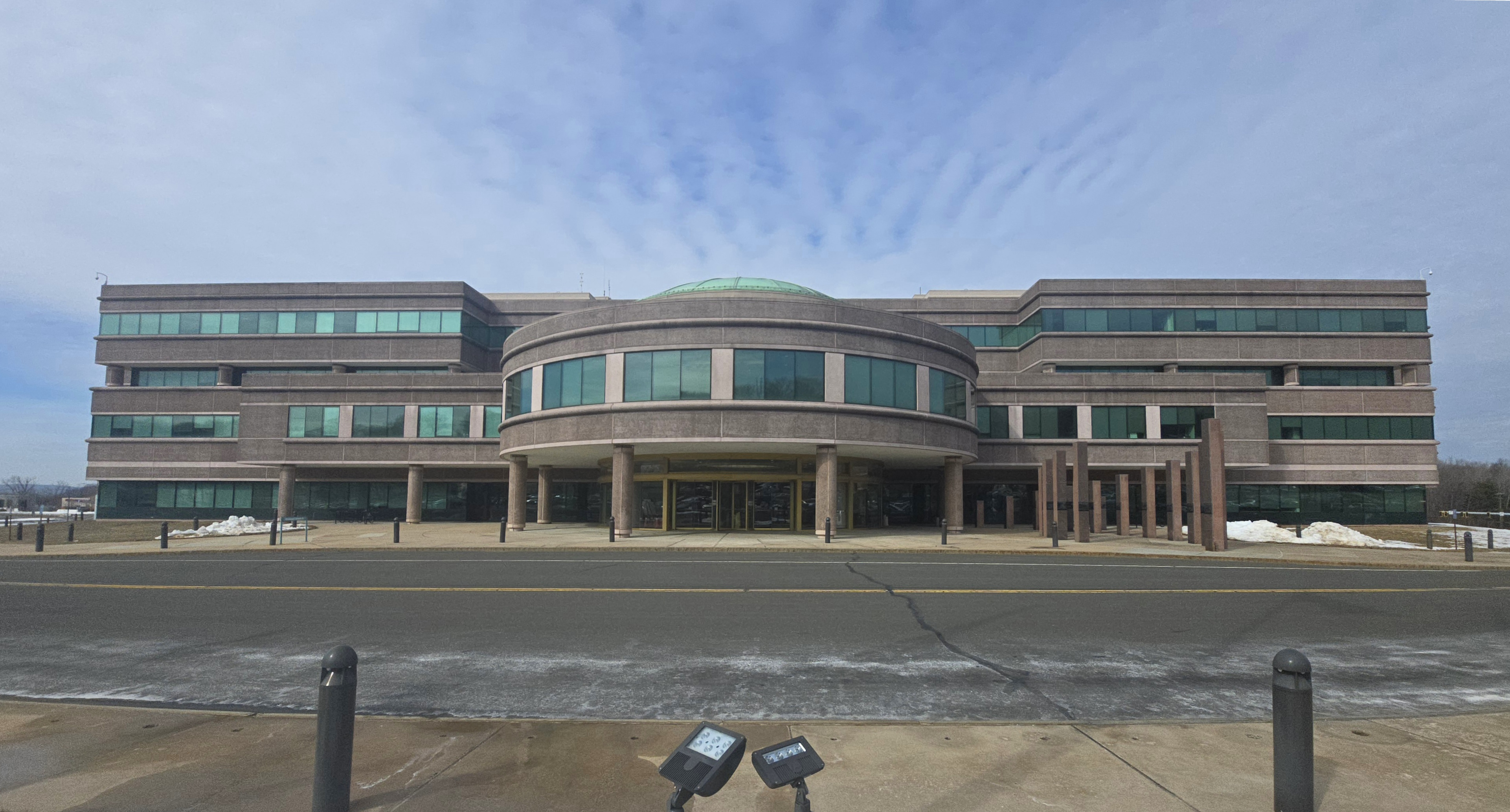
- Entrance to CTDOT Headquarters in Newington, Connecticut

Agency overview
- Formed: 1965; 61 years ago
- Preceding agency: Connecticut Highway Department
- Jurisdiction: Connecticut
- Headquarters: 2800 Berlin Turnpike, Newington, Connecticut
- Agency executive: Garrett T. Eucalitto, Commissioner
- Parent agency: State of Connecticut
- Website: portal.ct.gov/dot

The Connecticut Department of Transportation (officially referred to as CTDOT, formerly ConnDOT, and CDOT in rare instances) is responsible for the development and operation of highways, railroads, mass transit systems, ports and waterways in Connecticut.

CTDOT manages and maintains the state highway system. It oversees the Shore Line East and Hartford Line commuter rail systems under the CTrail brand, and owns the Connecticut section of the New Haven Line used by Metro-North Railroad and Amtrak Northeast Corridor services. CTDOT also oversees the CTtransit bus system, as well as the CTfastrak bus rapid transit service.

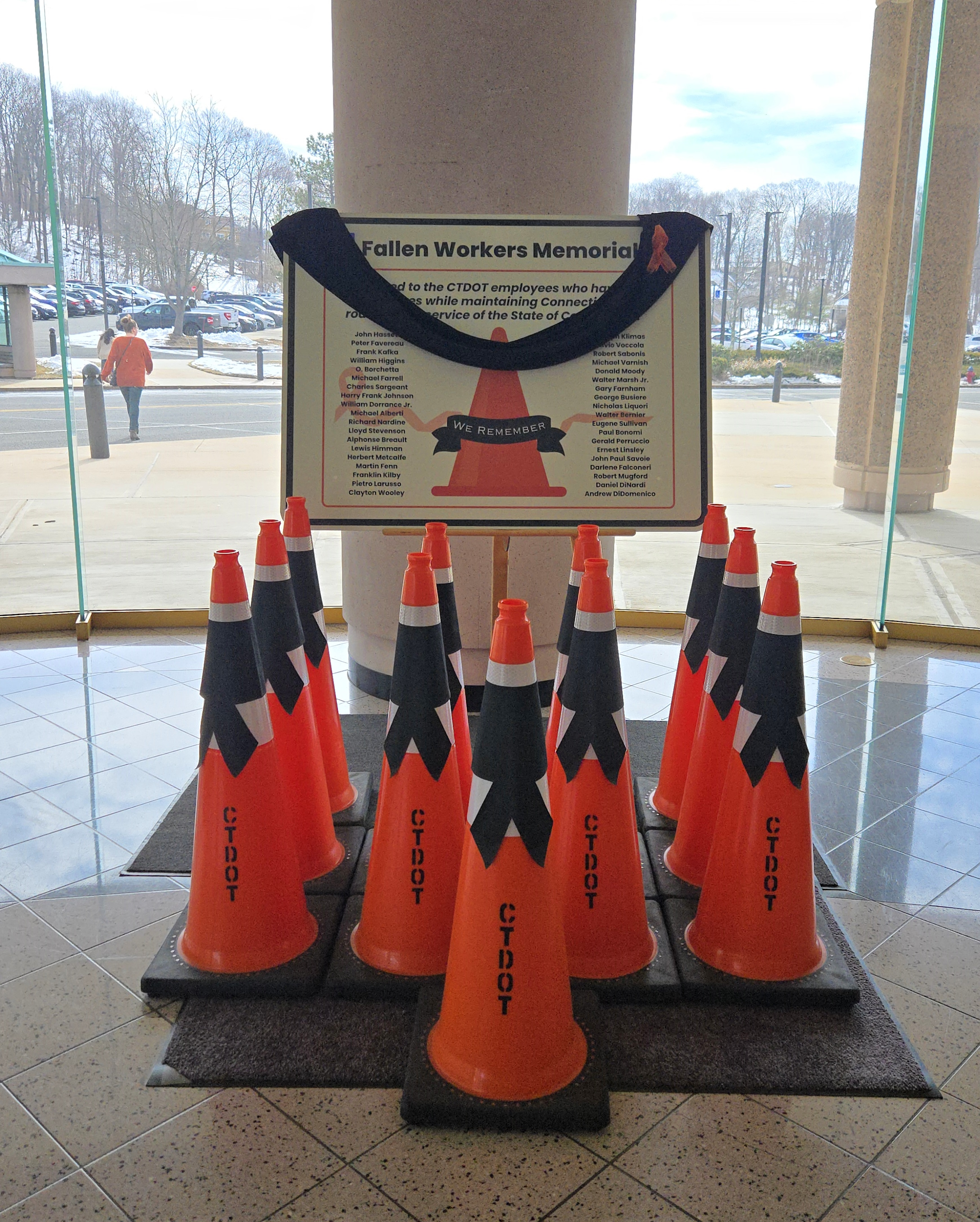
CTDOT's Fallen Workers Memorial, located in the headquarters' lobby

Prior to the establishment of the Connecticut Airport Authority in 2011, CTDOT had previously overseen the development and operation of Connecticut's state-owned airports, including Bradley International Airport. Prior to the establishment of the Connecticut Port Authority in 2014, CTDOT had previously overseen maritime issues and the state-owned pier in New London.

== See also ==
- Transportation in Connecticut
- List of state routes in Connecticut
