= Stanstead, Suffolk =

Village in Suffolk, England

Coordinates: 52.1°N 0.683°E

Stanstead
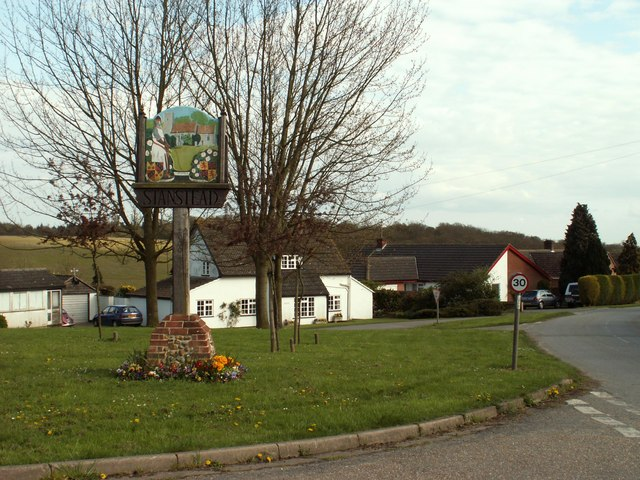
- Village sign, Stanstead, Suffolk

- Location within Suffolk
- Population: 319 (2011)
- District: Babergh
- Shire county: Suffolk
- Region: East
- Country: England
- Sovereign state: United Kingdom
- Post town: Sudbury
- Postcode district: CO10
- UK Parliament: South Suffolk

Stanstead is a village and civil parish in Suffolk, England. The name Stanstead comes from the Old English for "Stony place". Located off the B1066, it is around 4 miles (6 km) from Sudbury, and is part of Babergh district. It is about 2 kilometres (1 mi) from Glemsford, 12 miles (19 km) from Hadleigh, and 4 miles (6 km) from Lavenham.

== Etymology ==
The name Stanstead is Anglo Saxon for "stony place" and it is easy to appreciate how this came about when viewing the surrounding fields, particularly in the lower part of the village, which are strewn with glacial flint. There is much evidence of earlier Iron Age and Roman settlements in the surrounding area.

== Geography ==
Stanstead is situated in Glem Valley to the north east of Sudbury. The Parish borders Long Melford in the west, Glemsford to the south, Boxted to the east and Shimpling to the north.

The village is T-shaped; the lower half of the settlement (Lower Street) follows the B1066 along the bottom of the valley past the old Stanstead osier beds. The upper part of the village is reached by a 30-metre climb up the hill past Stanstead Hall towards the church and a cluster of houses, a small green and then on to Upper Street and Blooms Hall Lane.

== Governance ==
Stanstead lies in the Babergh district of the shire county of Suffolk. The three tiers of local government are administered by

- Suffolk County Council
- Babergh District Council
- Stanstead Parish Council

== Transport ==
Shimpling is served by one bus service operated by Hedingham & Chambers:

== Education ==
The village is served by Hartest CEVCP School, a primary school currently catering for pupils aged 5–11.

Older children attend Sudbury Upper School and Arts College.

== Demography ==
According to the Office for National Statistics, at the time of the United Kingdom Census 2001, Stanstead had a population of 316 with 127 households.

=== Population change ===
Population growth in Stanstead from 1801 to 1891
Year	1801	1811	1821	1831	1841	1851	1881	1891
Population	258	284	341	353	387	412	369	368
Source: A Vision of Britain Through Time

Population growth in Stanstead from 1901 to 2001
Year	1901	1911	1921	1931	1951	1961	2001
Population	326	265	291	270	247	276	316
Source: A Vision of Britain Through Time

== Notable former residents ==
- Robert Calef (1648 - 1719), cloth merchant in colonial Boston and author.
- Edmund Rice (c.1594 – 1663), politician and founder of Marlborough, Massachusetts
