= Jonas Rice =

- Jonas Rice Memorial and Homesite marker placed in 1903 by the Worcester Society of Antiquity and descendants of Edmund Rice. The marker is located at the corner of Heywood and Vale Streets 42.248681°N 71.786618°W in Worcester, Massachusetts.

Judge of Court of Common Pleas
- In office 2 April 1731 – 22 September 1753

Personal details
- Born: March 6, 1672 Marlborough, Massachusetts, US
- Died: September 22, 1753 (aged 81) Worcester, Massachusetts, US
- Spouse: Mary (Stone) Rice (m. 10 Feb 1701)
- Children: 4

Jonas Rice (1672–1753) was the first permanent settler of European descent in Worcester, Massachusetts, and was a founder and prominent citizen of the town. He was elected as a judge to the Court of Common Pleas in Worcester County, Massachusetts and he served until his death.

== Biography ==
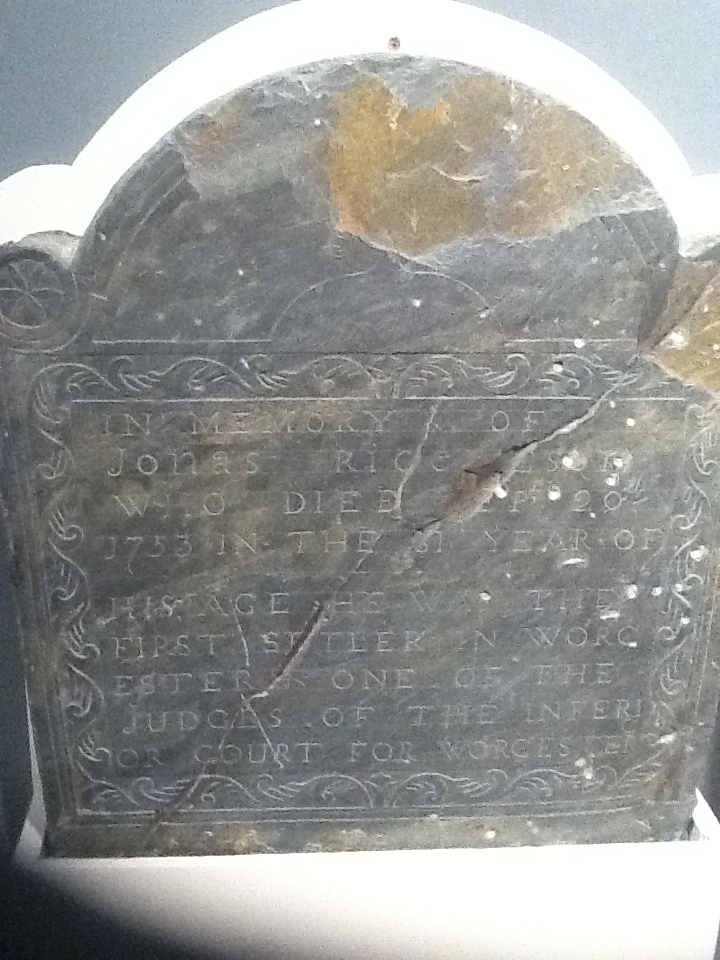
Gravestone of Jonas Rice, a founder of Worcester, Massachusetts and a Judge of Common Pleas in the permanent collection of the Worcester Historical Museum

Jonas Rice was born 6 March 1672 in Marlborough, Massachusetts to Thomas Rice (1621-1681) and Mary (King) Rice (1630-1714). His parents had both immigrated to Massachusetts Bay Colony from England, and his grandfather Edmund Rice was a founder of both Sudbury and Marlborough. His brother Thomas was a colonial legislator and a founder of Westborough, Massachusetts.

Rice resided before 1702 at Worcester, Massachusetts when it was known as Quinsigamond. Rice, along with most other residents, abandoned the town soon after the commencement of Queen Anne's War. He returned at the end of hostilities on 14 Dec 1711, and he bought 60 acres of land in what is now in central Worcester. He was a signatory on petition dated 13 October 1713 presented to the Great and General Court expressing desire to reestablish Worcester as a town. Rice served as a selectman in Worcester beginning in 1722 and as town clerk, and he served as the first schoolmaster in 1726, and was an officer in the militia, attaining the rank of major in 1734. Rice was selected as judge to the Court of Common Pleas in Worcester County on the establishment of the county.

Rice died on 22 September 1753 in Worcester, and was buried at Old Common Cemetery. He left a will on 23 July 1753, proved 7 Nov. 1753. The will mentions wife Mary; daughter Silence, wife of John Bond; eldest son Jonas; and sons Absalom and Adonijah, and the inventory was £200. Absalom Rice was the executor.
