= Puritan Village =

History book by Sumner Chilton Powell

Puritan Village: The Formation of a New England Town
- Pulitzer Prize in History 1964
- Author: Sumner Chilton Powell
- Language: English
- Genre: Non-fiction
- Publisher: Wesleyan University Press
- Publication date: 1963
- Publication place: United States
- Pages: 215

Puritan Village: The Formation of a New England Town is a nonfiction history book by American historian Sumner Chilton Powell published in 1963 by Wesleyan University Press, which won the 1964 Pulitzer Prize for History. It minutely examines the records of Sudbury, Massachusetts from 1638-1660 to show how the town developed mainly from emigrants from Watertown, Massachusetts, tracing every settler back to England, concluding that there were no typical "English" towns and no typical "Puritans".
