= Old Connecticut Path =

Native American trail

Coordinates: 42°21′19″N 71°20′42″W

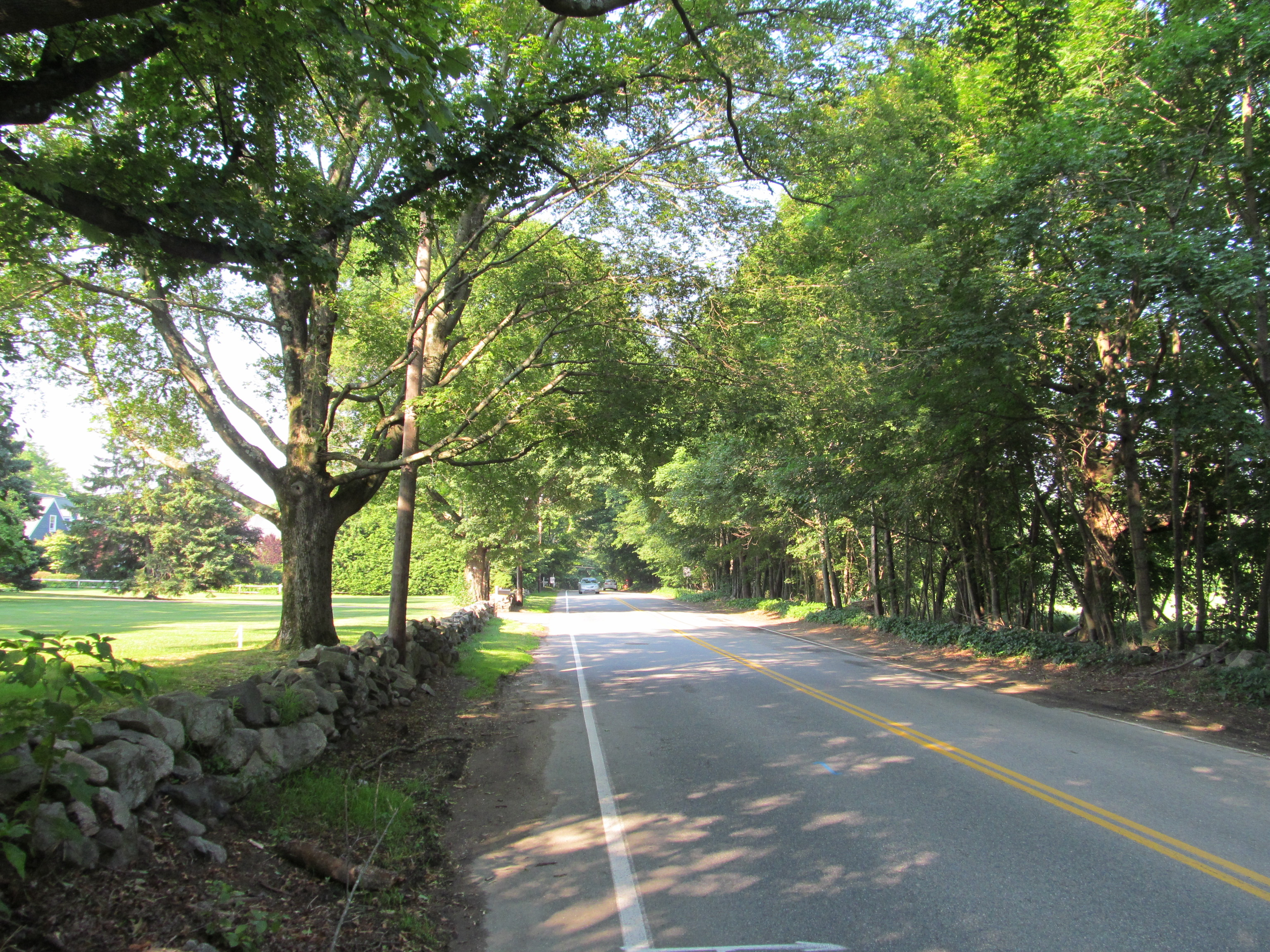
Old Connecticut Path in Wayland, Massachusetts

The Old Connecticut Path was the Native American trail that led westward from the area of Massachusetts Bay to the Connecticut River Valley, the first of the North American trails that led west from the settlements close to the Atlantic seacoast, towards the interior. The earliest colonists of Massachusetts Bay Colony used it, and rendered it wider by driving cattle along it. The old route is still followed, for part of its length, by Massachusetts Route 9 and Massachusetts Route 126.

== History ==
In lean years of the early 1630s, when the Massachusetts Bay Colony ran short of grain, Nipmuck farmers in the Connecticut River Valley loaded some of their abundant surplus maize into birch-bark backpacks and trod a familiar route to the settlements at the mouth of the Charles River, where they traded food for European goods made of copper and iron and woollen cloth. Fur traders and the exploratory party of John Oldham (1633) penetrated this first of the trails west into the continent's interior. In 1635, some settlers from Watertown took this route when they removed to Wethersfield, Connecticut.

In 1636, the dissenting minister Thomas Hooker a hundred of his congregation, and 160 cattle, followed the Old Connecticut Path in a two-weeks' journey to the Connecticut River. There they settled in a place the native Tunxis peoples called Saukiog, because of the blackness of its earth. They founded the English settlement of Hartford. By 1643, documents in the village of Sudbury called this trail the "Old Connecticut Path." In 1672, with the establishment of a postal system, it became the first colonial post road.

== Route ==
Long native usage had emphasized the easiest route, skirting the water meadows of the river bottoms and crossing streams at the most dependable fords. During the trip to Connecticut the Path crosses the Blackstone River, that crossing was known as the North Bridge and the Quinebaug River crossing was known as the South Bridge, both Northbridge and Southbridge were named after those well-known landmark locations.

=== Massachusetts ===
The Path led west along the north bank of the Charles River from New Town (Cambridge) to newly settled Watertown and passed through what are now Waltham and Weston, curving southward where it entered the southeasterly section of the new town of Sudbury, now set apart as Wayland, where a section of the route still bears the name "Old Connecticut Path". At Wayland, the Bay Path, later the Boston Post Road, diverged from the Connecticut Path and headed west through Marlborough, Worcester, and Brookfield straight toward the Connecticut River. In Sudbury the Connecticut Path was known as "the road from Watertown to the Dunster Farm", since after passing along the north side of Cochituate Pond, it crossed the tract beyond that was granted to Henry Dunster, president of Harvard College, and the lands of Edmund Rice and Philemon Whale. The trail crossed the Sudbury River at "Danforth's Farm", since 1700 incorporated as Framingham, where another section (Route 126) retains the name "Old Connecticut Path", threading past the northern shore of Lake Cochituate. The Connecticut Path headed west, threading between the Charles and Sudbury rivers on its way to the Connecticut River. "From Framingham the Old Connecticut Path runs southward through South Framingham, Ashland (Megunko), Hopkinton (Quansigamog), then through Westborough and over Fay Mountain, to the praying town of Hassanamesit/Hassanamisco, now Grafton, through Sutton and then beyond to Connecticut.

=== Connecticut ===
The Old Connecticut path entered Connecticut at the praying town of Maanexit, now Thompson, and continued into Woodstock. Past Woodstock, the path crossed Eastford, Ashford and Willington. Modern travelers can walk along portions of the path in both of those towns in places such as the Nipmuck Trail and the Fenton-Ruby Park. Continuing westward, the trail crosses Tolland, Vernon, and a small corner of Manchester, before ending at the Connecticut River.
