= Sumner Chilton Powell =

American historian (1924–1993)

- Born: October 2, 1924; Northampton, Massachusetts, U.S.
- Died: July 8, 1993 (aged 68); Colora, Maryland, U.S.
- Education: Amherst College; Harvard University
- Occupations: Historian; teacher
- Known for: Pulitzer Prize–winning historian; author of Puritan Village
- Awards: Pulitzer Prize for History (1964)

Sumner Chilton Powell (October 2, 1924 in Northampton, Massachusetts – July 8, 1993 in Colora, Maryland) was an American historian and history teacher at the Choate School, a college-prep boarding school in Wallingford, Connecticut.

He attended The Taft School in Watertown, Connecticut, earned a bachelor's degree from Amherst College in 1946, and from 1947 to 1952 was an active US Naval Officer attaining the rank of Lieutenant (jg), but remained a Naval Reserve Officer until 1961. He earned a doctorate in history from Harvard University in 1956.

In 1957 he published From Mythical to Medieval Man. He won the 1964 Pulitzer Prize for History for Puritan Village: The Formation of a New England Town (1963), based on records on Sudbury, Massachusetts from 1638 to 1660, tracing every settler back to England.
