= Worcester Historical Museum =

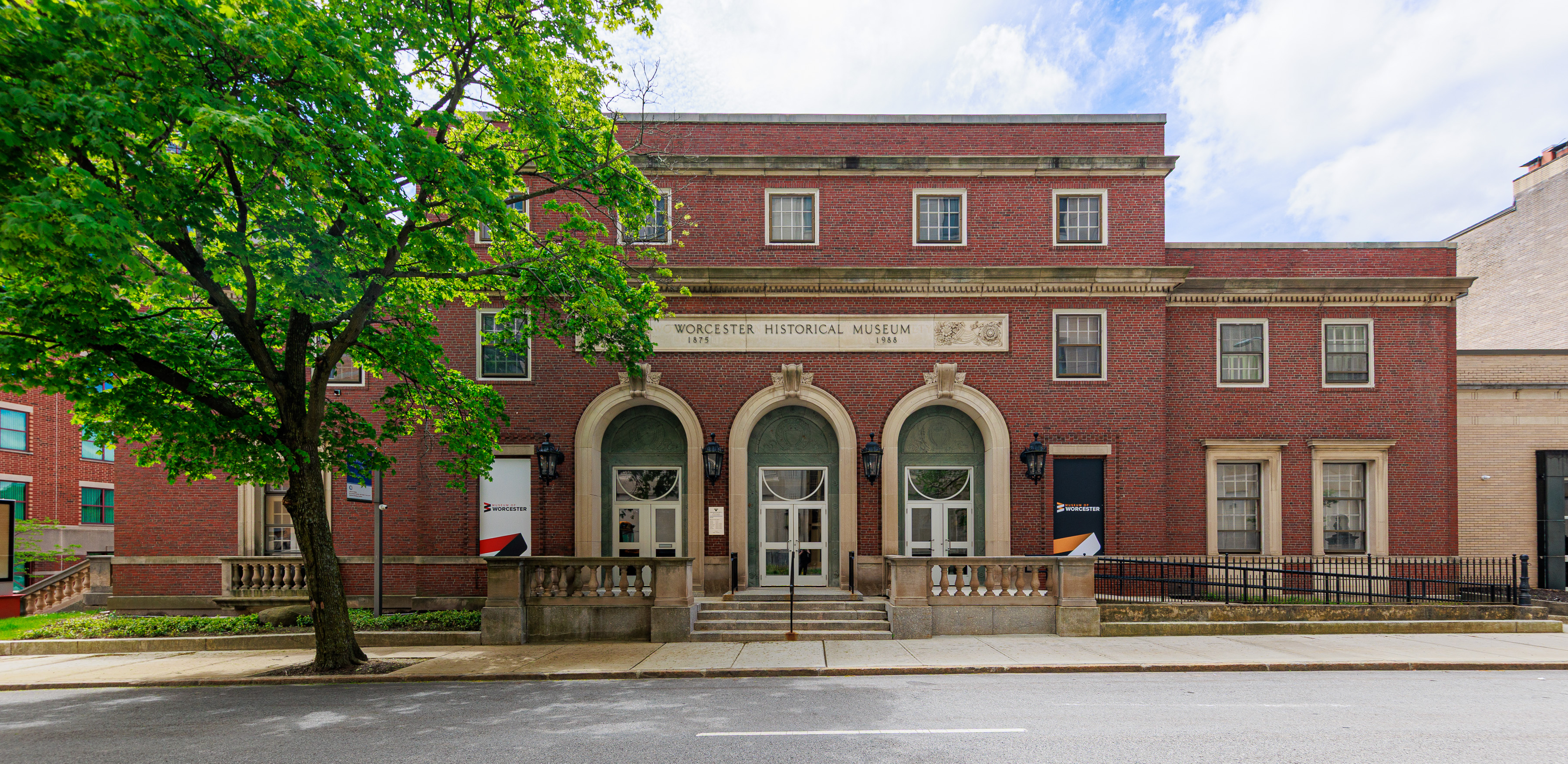
- Main entrance on Elm Street
- Former name: Worcester Society of Antiquity
- Established: 1875
- Location: 30 Elm Street; Worcester, Massachusetts
- Coordinates: 42.2648958°N 71.8067823°W
- Type: History museum Historic house museum
- Director: William Wallace
- Architect: Frederick Coulson =

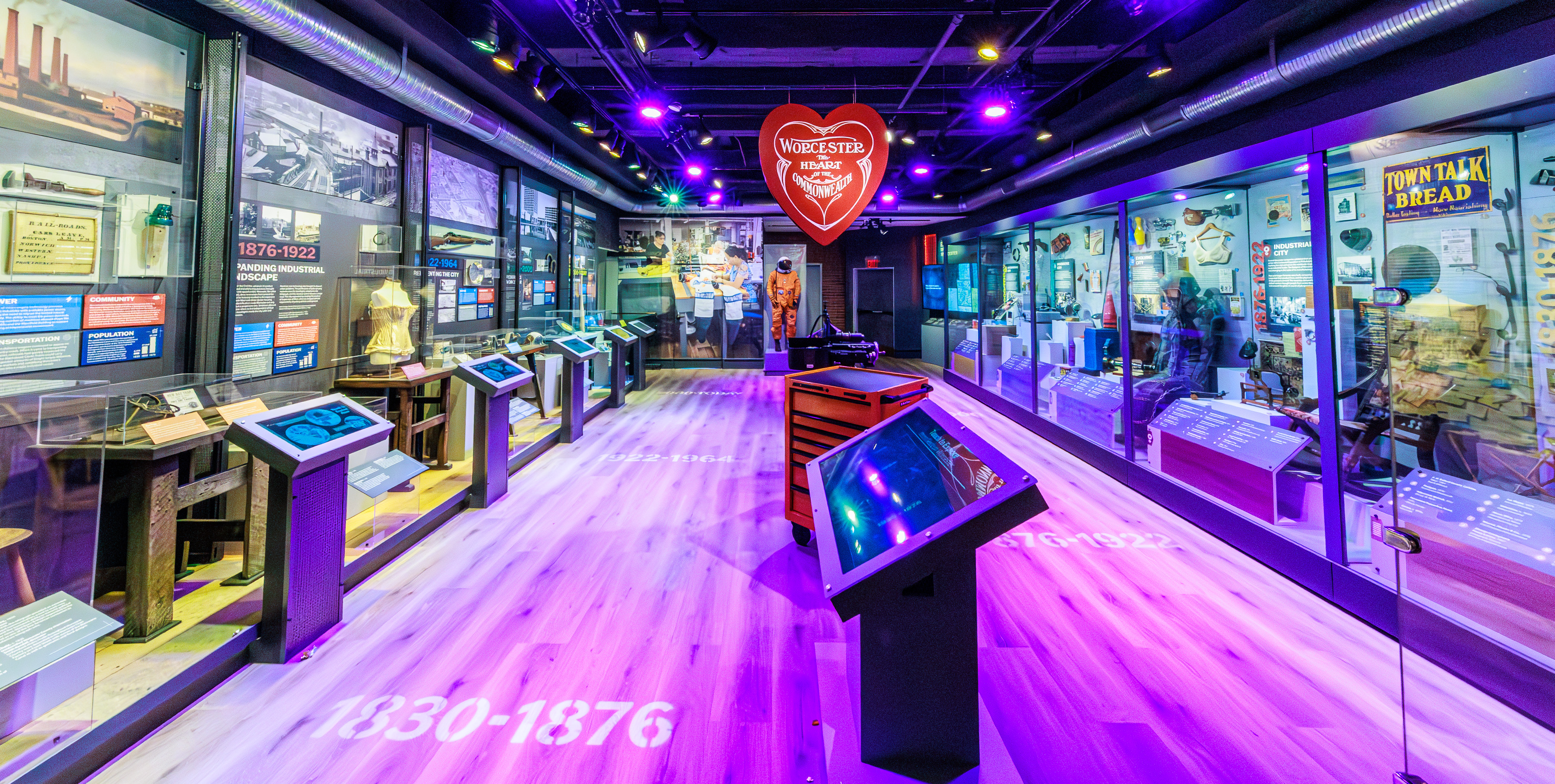
Fuller Gallery of Industrial History

The Worcester Historical Museum, located in downtown Worcester, Massachusetts, United States, was founded in 1875 as the Worcester Society of Antiquity. This museum is the only institution in the area devoted entirely to local history and artifacts. The scope of their collection ranges from colonial to twentieth-century, encompassing manuscripts, textiles, paintings, and ceramics. The museum is made up of permanent and temporary exhibits, a research library, and currently owns and operates the local Salisbury Mansion. The library maintains more than 7,000 titles.

== Exhibits ==
There is one permanent exhibit at the museum in the Fuller Gallery of Industrial History, entitled "In Their Shirtsleeves." This collection covers the Industrial history of Worcester through recently donated artifacts as well as items the Institution has collected over the decades. Dealing with a time period spanning over a century, the collection highlights the accomplishment of Worcester locals and the impact their inventions had on the area and beyond. They also have three other exhibit areas that house temporary displays.

Cultural history exhibits like "Smiley - An American Icon" explored the Smiley graphic and its designer, Worcester native Harvey Ball, from October 2006 to February 2007. In 2013, the exhibit "Game On!" covered 150 years of toys and was intended to be navigated like a board game.

The museum has highlighted the history of Worcester's diverse population through many exhibitions over the past 40 years. In the 1980s and 1990s, there were exhibits like “Water Street: A World Within a World” about the historically Jewish section of Worcester and “ga till Amerika: Swedes in Worcester 1868-1993.” Since then, the museum has displayed and collected items relating to the history of many minority communities of Worcester. In 2008, the Guatemalan immigrant community was the focus of the exhibit “The Things We Carried: Guatemalan Stories,” in 2008. Since 2018, the museum and the Worcester Black History Project have collected oral histories, objects, and photos of local Black history. In 2018, the temporary exhibit "The Legacy of Water Street: 35 Years of Sharing Worcester’s Jewish History" revisited the original Water Street exhibit and expanded on the history of the local Jewish community. From April to October 2019, the “For The Record: LGBTQ+ Worcester'' exhibit united “the scattered documentation of Worcester County’s LGBTQ+ experience” in order to commemorate the 50th anniversary of the Stonewall Riots. In conjunction with the College of the Holy Cross, Clark University, Worcester Polytechnic Institute and Digital Worcester, "For The Record" was created as a “down payment of sorts, in a larger project to build a sustainable physical and digital archive” relating to the Worcester LGBTQ+ community.

In conjunction with the Latino History Project of Worcester, the permanent exhibit "Somos Worcester" will go on display in 2024 to showcase local Latino history.

== Library ==
The research library is open to the public for a fee, Tuesday through Saturday 10-4 pm. Access to the archives material is available through appointment.

== See also ==
- List of historical societies in Massachusetts
