= Mark D. Devlin =

American writer (1948–2005)

- Mark D. Devlin, Stubborn Child
- Born: February 4, 1948; Dorchester, Massachusetts
- Died: March 10, 2005 (aged 57); Braintree, Massachusetts
- Occupation: Author

Mark Dennis Devlin (4 February 1948 - 10 March 2005) was the author of Stubborn Child (ISBN 0-6891-1476-1), a critically acclaimed memoir published in 1985. He died on March 10, 2005. The cause of death was not released but he had battled mental illness, alcoholism, and physical problems for many years. He was 57 years old.

== Stubborn Child ==
As a child, his alcoholic father frequently beat the Boston native. At seven years of age, Mark was deemed a "stubborn child," and locked up. Under state law, a stubborn child was one who "stubbornly refused to submit to the lawful and reasonable commands of a parent or guardian." Devlin spent most of his childhood in state institutions. He later told the press that growing up in the Commonwealth of Massachusetts juvenile justice system turned him into a criminal. Devlin testified to a state legislative committee about conditions in the reform school system as part of the process by which the schools were closed and the juvenile justice system reformed in Massachusetts.

== Detained juvenile ==
Mark was a graduate of the Lyman School for Boys, the Roslindale juvenile detention center, and the Bridgewater, Massachusetts reformatory known as the Institute for Juvenile Guidance. According to his book, when Mark was seven years of age his mother brought him before an old man who wore black robes. Mark’s mother talked to the old man and then somebody brought him to a large building in Roslindale, Massachusetts, where somebody shoved him into a darkened room and locked the door. Mark started to cry for his mother. That was the start of Mark’s encounter with the Massachusetts juvenile corrections system. Once while an inmate of the Bridgewater reformatory Mark was able to look across a prison yard and see his father in the adult section. That was likely as close as they were until after the publication of his book, when he attempted to reconcile with members of his family.

== Criminal ==
As a young adult, Mark fell in love with a former girlfriend of one of the few friends he met at the Bridgewater reformatory. They decided to move to a different state and start a new life together, but en route, Devlin was arrested for driving a stolen automobile across state lines. He spent a total of six years in a federal reformatory and then married his girlfriend while on parole. Their first child, a son, was placed up for adoption. Their second child, a daughter, was raised in several foster homes before being adopted by Mark's sister. The couple later divorced. Mark had a third child, a son, in a short relationship in later life. In a turbulent life, he accumulated a variety of legal charges, some likely valid, but was not a professional criminal; rather he lived precariously and most often as a saloon anecdotalist and singer.

== Road scholar ==
Long before the movie, and as a play on the words "Rhodes Scholar," this self-described "Road Scholar" decided to become a writer. While living on the streets, Mark's worldly possessions consisted of a bag filled with clothes, a dictionary, a thesaurus, pencils and a pad of paper. His first publishing success was a letter to the editor of The Real Paper. Mark Zanger, a columnist at the now-defunct, Cambridge, Massachusetts alternative weekly, turned the letter into an article. It was about staying at Boston's Charles Street Jail after it was condemned.

== Author and celebrity ==
When Stubborn Child was published in 1985, it received national attention. Profiles appeared in the Boston Globe Magazine and in People. Mark kept in touch with his publisher using public telephones and gave interviews from park benches. The movie rights were sold to director William Friedkin for $10,000, but the film was never produced. Devlin was the first author to publish a book about the Lyman School for Boys from the perspective of an inmate.

== Later life ==
For most of the next 30 years, Devlin was homeless, although he had periods of stability. In the 1990s, after a suicide attempt, he was diagnosed with bipolar disorder and responded well to medication and a sober lifestyle for parts of several years. He wrote an unpublished account of his breakdown, and made several starts on a work of fiction about his father's life and their relationship. He maintained longstanding friendships despite his lifestyle and increasing physical and legal problems.
