= Lyman School for Boys =

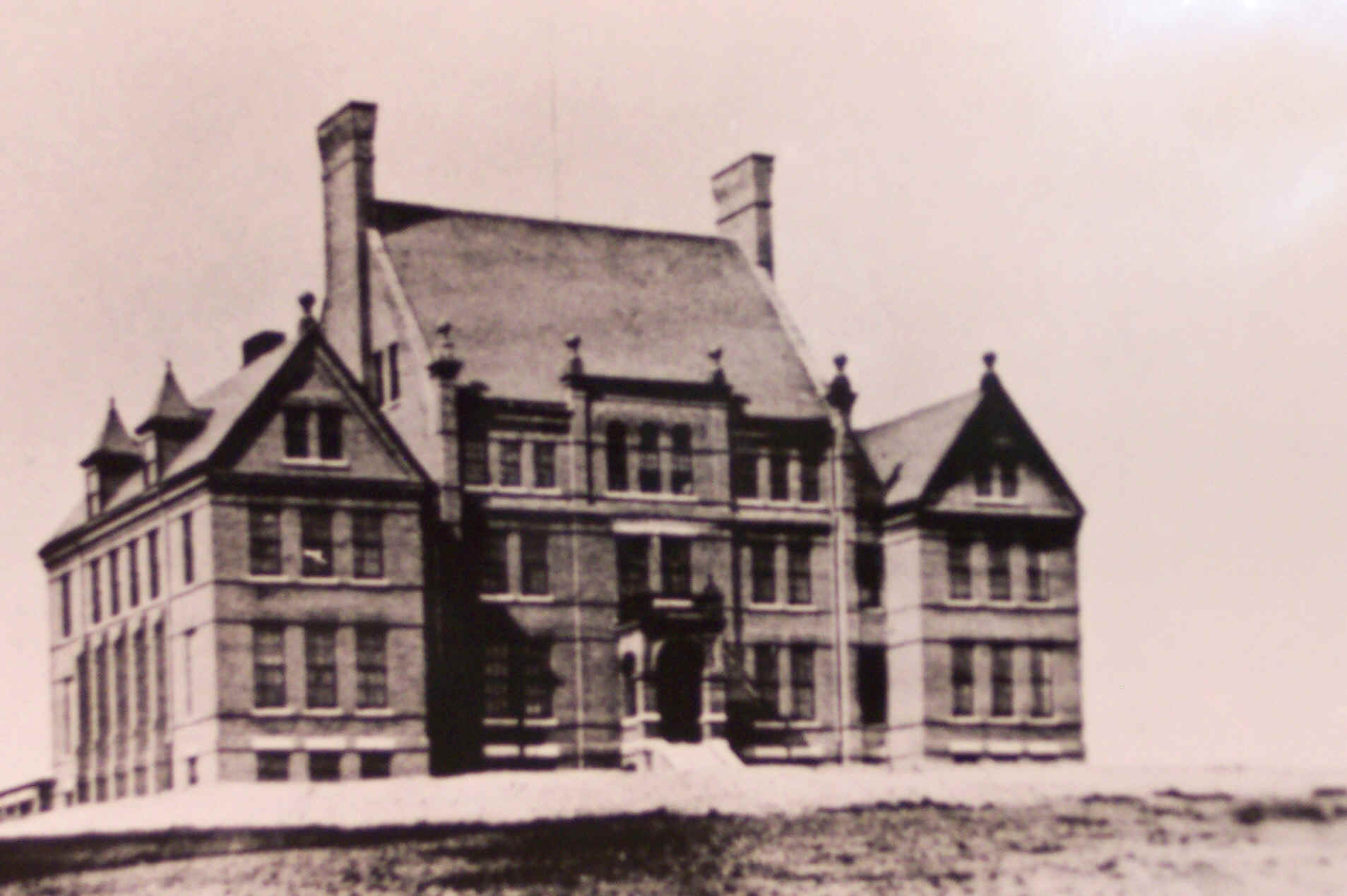
- Lyman Hall and Chauncy Cottage (Induction Center)

Location
- Westborough, Massachusetts; United States; 42°17′15″N 71°37′45″W

Information
- Type: Reform School
- Established: 1846; 180 years ago
- Closed: 1971
- Head of school: John Borys (1956–1960)
- Staff: 40
- Faculty: 20
- Grades: Males 9 to 18 years of age
- Enrollment: 400
- Campus size: 1,000 acres (400 ha)
- Affiliation: Massachusetts Youth Service Board (now DYS)
- Website
- Lyman School for Boys
- U.S. National Register of Historic Places
- U.S. Historic district
- Location within Massachusetts Location within the United States
- Location: Jct. of Oak and South Sts., Westborough, Massachusetts
- Area: 200 acres (81 ha)
- Built: 1847
- Architect: George Clough, et al.
- Architectural style: Federal, Queen Anne, Late 19th And 20th Century Revivals
- MPS: Massachusetts State Hospitals And State Schools MPS
- NRHP reference No.: 94000693
- Added to NRHP: July 25, 1994

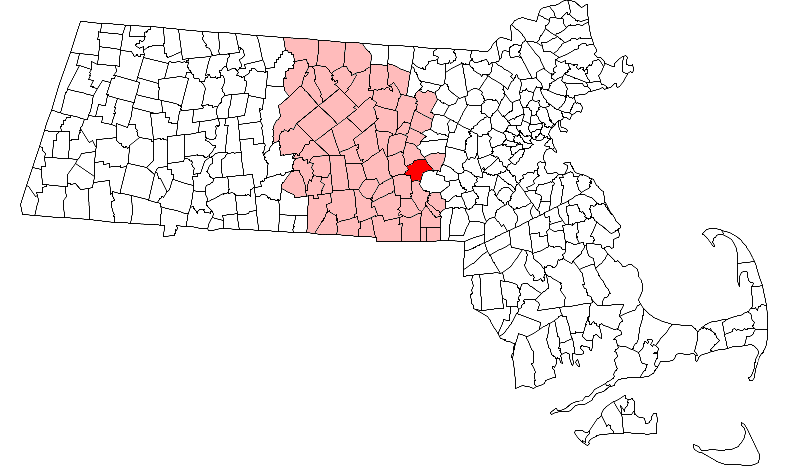
Location of Westborough

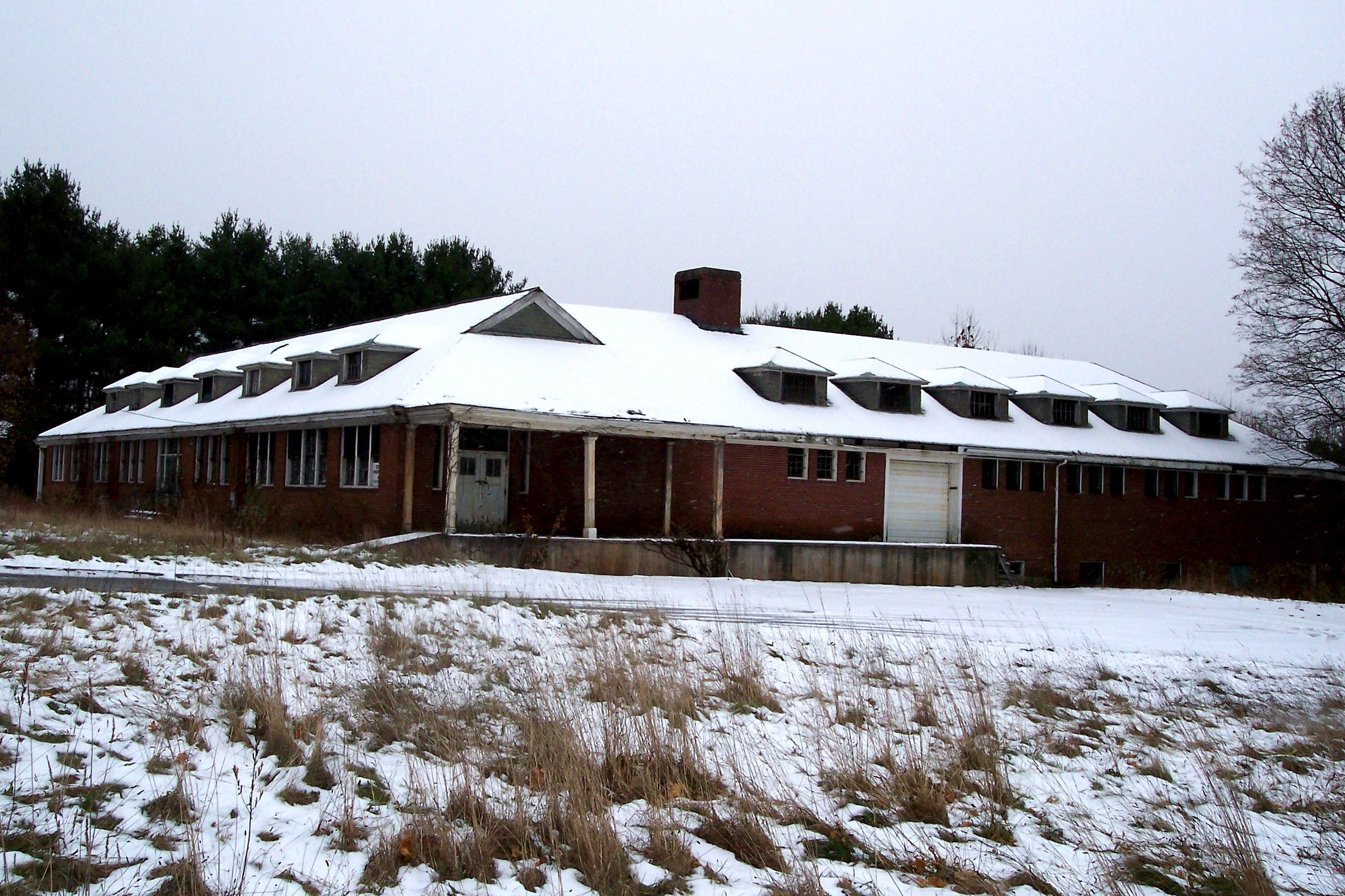
Campus building subsequent to closure

The Lyman School for Boys was established by the Commonwealth of Massachusetts in c. 1884 and operated until c. 1971. The institution opened following the closure of the State Reform School for Boys in Westborough. The school was named for its principal benefactor, philanthropist Theodore Lyman, who served as mayor of Boston, Massachusetts from 1834 to 1836. The property is listed in the National Register of Historic Places.

== Location and changing economy ==
Lyman School was situated near Lake Chauncy in the town of Westborough, on Powder Hill, off State Route 9. It comprised about one thousand acres (400 ha) of which about five hundred acres (200 ha) were prime farmland, maintained by its students. The farm remained a principal means of support for the school until about 1955 when the economy of the region became predominantly industrial rather than agricultural due to the placement of major companies along State Route 9. At that time training of the students was changed to adapt to the new economy.

== Population established by courts ==
Students were sent to the Lyman School when the courts had determined that it would be in the public interest. Until about 1970, juveniles in the Commonwealth of Massachusetts were afforded none of the now-commonly accepted constitutional rights. Therefore, many boys were sent to this reform school for "crimes" such as truancy and being a stubborn child. In fact, an ancient law in the Commonwealth allowed stubborn children to be put to death. It remained on the books even though it was never ostensibly invoked. Several famous criminals attended the Lyman School, one of them being the Boston Strangler, Albert DeSalvo.

== Cottage system of administration ==
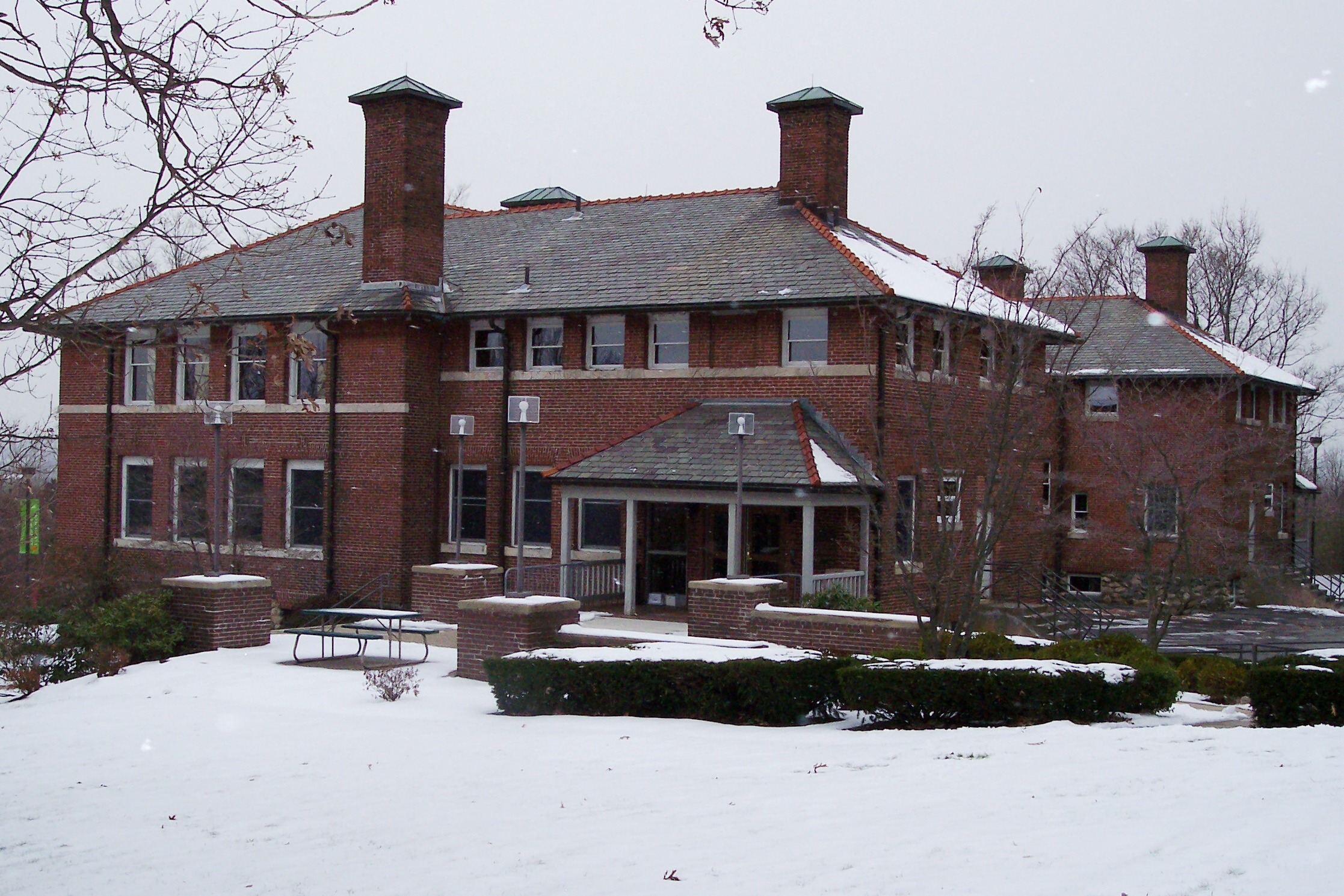
Worcester/Westview Cottage

Students at the school were subject to strict discipline. They were required to conform at all times to rules that were enforced with corporal punishment. Students lived in so-called cottages. These were large brick buildings providing shelter for about 100 boys in each. The top floor comprised a dormitory and the lower floors, the living space. Each cottage was ruled by a cottage master and usually a cottage matron. This husband-and-wife team lived in a cottage apartment and was on duty 24 hours a day. In the late 1950s, it became difficult to find cottage parents willing to work such long hours, so several changes were made.

The cottages were named for towns or places of geographical importance. In the 1950 to 1960 era, the cottages were Lyman Hall, Chauncey, Overlook, Sunset, Hillside, Wachusett, Worcester, Elms, and Oak. Lyman Hall was the induction center for all new students. Oak Cottage was the discipline cottage. Runaways, troublemakers, and returnees were put there for attitude adjustment. Residents were usually graded according to age. The youngest boys lived in Chauncey Cottage and the oldest in Elms Cottage. The photograph of this subsection shows a typical cottage. This large building comprised Worcester and Westview.

Worcester and Wachusett cottages share the same building.

== Religious education ==
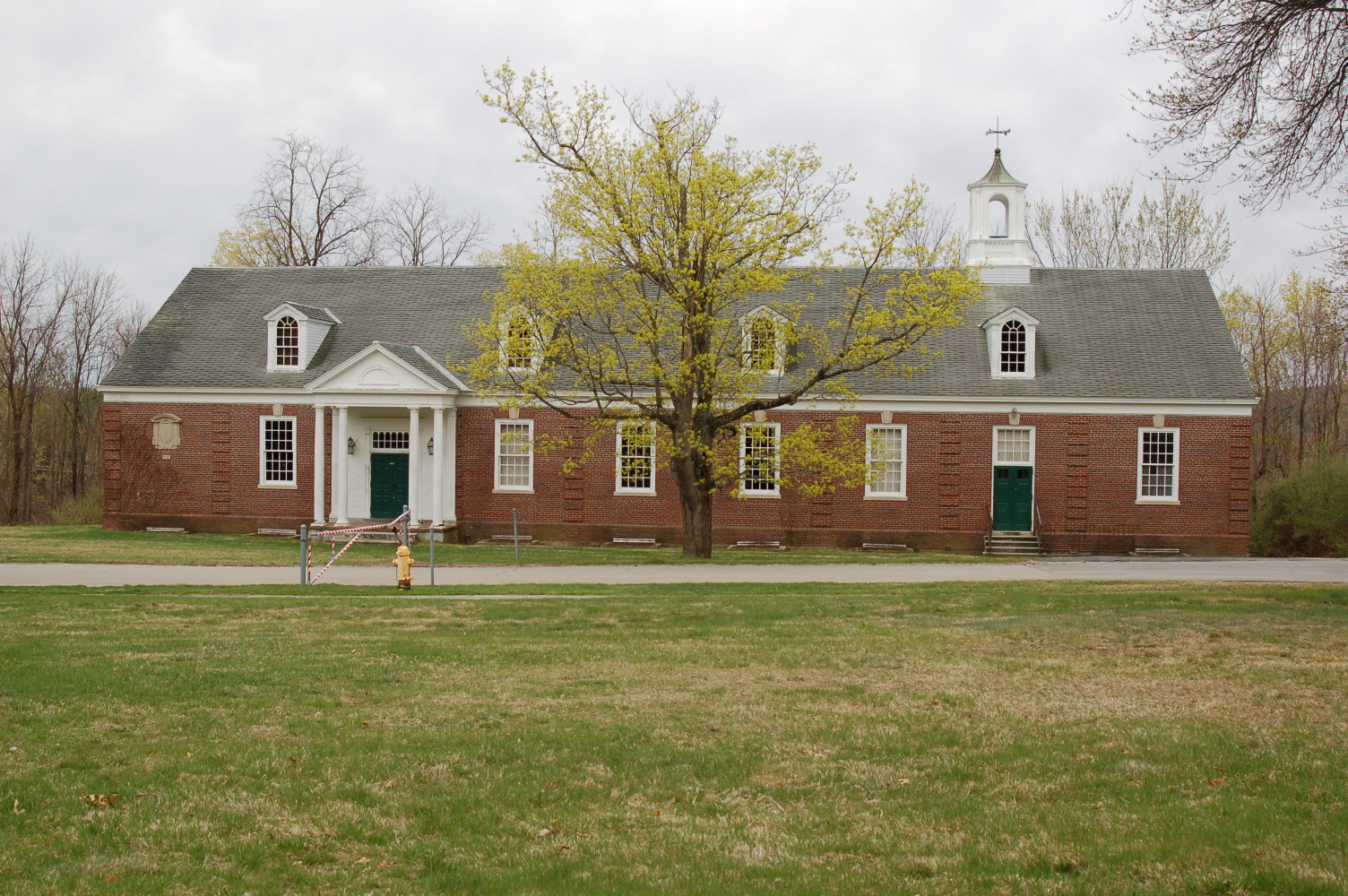
The Lyman School auditorium and church

Religious education was required. Each boy was supplied a suit of clothes that he wore to religious services on Sunday. Any boy who was not Catholic was assumed Protestant. The auditorium used for church services was also used for the showing of movies on Saturday afternoon. Watching movies was one of the privileges that could be revoked for maintaining order and discipline.

== Society at the school ==
The Lyman School was a nearly complete town in itself. It looked like a college campus. All of the maintenance, construction, and repair of the facilities were performed by its students. They were supervised by trade masters. A student attending the Lyman School would learn a trade whether he wanted to or not. It was not optional. The trades taught were grounds-keeping, laundry, cooking and other cafeteria skills, carpentry, painting, masonry, janitorial work, electrical work, plumbing and steam-fitting, boiler maintenance, and printing. The entire official corpus of printed documents of the Commonwealth of Massachusetts, and all the government stationery, were printed in the Lyman School print shop.

The Lyman School for Boys has a less than pacific social history ranging from its nearly complete destruction by arson in its early years to runaways who were never caught nor heard from again. Institutional folklore had it that missing runaways were not runaways at all, but children killed by the cottage or trade masters, with their bodies buried in the swamps behind the hill.

== Attendee total ==
Approximately three hundred boys "graduated" from the Lyman School for Boys every year.

== Sherrie Connelly project ==
During the 1960s, college students from Harvard University in Cambridge, Massachusetts, including Ted Todd, regularly visited boys at Lyman School. In the fall of 1964, Sherrie Connelly, then a student at Smith College in Northampton, Massachusetts, visited the school with Todd and developed a Christmas project involving about 100 college students who sent Christmas cards and gifts to boys at Lyman School. Many boys were very appreciative of visits, gifts and cards, and some correspondences developed. Connelly later conducted a project for a college organization behavior class studying the school from the perspectives of people in different roles at the school.

== Closure ==
During the administration of Governor Endicott Peabody (1962–1965), various trade unions complained that maintenance of state-owned buildings at the Lyman School was being performed by non-union labor. If the trade unions were to have their way, the cost to the Commonwealth to maintain each student at the institution would increase from about five thousand to fifty thousand dollars per year. The institution was closed in 1971 by the Massachusetts Department of Youth Services just two years after Governor Francis Sargent appointed Jerome G. Miller as its Commissioner. Miller's Last One Over the Wall describes his involvement in the institution's closing.

== Notable people ==
=== Alumni ===
- Albert DeSalvo (Boston Strangler)
- Mark D. Devlin (d. 2005), the author of Stubborn Child, who died in 2005
- Richard B. Johnson, author of Abominable Firebug, who writes considerable details about students' daily activities at the school.
- Stanley Rice, serial killer

=== Others ===
- Theodore Lyman, principal benefactor
- Jerome G. Miller, Commissioner
- Flora E. Strout (1867–1962), teacher

== See also ==
- Nathan Fisher House, a c. 1820 house on the school grounds
- Maples Cottage, also on the grounds
- National Register of Historic Places listings in Worcester County, Massachusetts

== Sources ==
- Devlin, Mark (1985). Stubborn Child. Macmillan. ISBN 0-689-11476-1.
- "Richard "Dick" Bolt's Lyman School history".
