= CJCJ =

CJCJ may refer to:

- CJCJ, former call sign of CJAQ-FM in Calgary, Alberta, Canada
- CJCJ-FM, a radio station in Woodstock, New Brunswick
- Center on Juvenile and Criminal Justice, a nonprofit organization based in San Francisco, California
