= Flora E. Strout =

American teacher, social reformer, missionary, temperance worker (1867–1862)

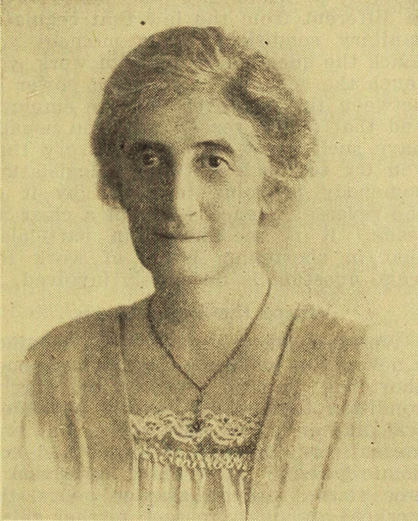
- Born: Flora Effie Strout; April 28, 1867; Mechanic Falls, Maine, U.S.
- Died: November 5, 1962 (aged 95); Arlington, Massachusetts, U.S.
- Burial place: Mount Auburn Cemetery, Middlesex County, Massachusetts, U.S.
- Occupations: teacher; social reformer; missionary

Flora Effie Strout (April 28, 1867 – November 5, 1962) was an American teacher and social reformer. Early on, she taught at Lyman School for Boys in Massachusetts and then at Morgan College (now Morgan State University), where she also served as principal. As an organizer of the World's Woman's Christian Temperance Union (WCTU), she served as a foreign missionary and temperance movement worker, for three five-year periods in various parts of Asia. She was also involved in the social purity movement and was active in supporting women's suffrage. She wrote occasional articles on temperance issues and the lyrics for Morgan College's school anthem.

== Biography ==
Flora Effie Strout was born in Mechanic Falls, Maine, April 28, 1867. She was educated in the public and normal schools of Maine. Later, she took courses at Johns Hopkins University and two courses at Harvard University.

Strout began her career as a teacher. In 1889, she taught for 24 weeks at West Harpswell, Maine. For the following two years, she taught at Lyman School for Boys, a state reform school in Westborough, Massachusetts.

Strout taught various subjects at Morgan College (geology and astronomy, 1893–94; 18th-century literature, 1905) and also served as principal. She wrote the university's alma mater (official song).

Representing Maryland, Strout was a delegate at the American Woman Suffrage Association's 25th annual convention held in Washington, D.C., 1893, and was a member of the Program Committee for the 37th annual convention held at Portland, Oregon, in 1905. She was also a delegate representing Maryland at the National WCTU's 34th Annual Convention held at Nashville, Tennessee, in 1906.

On behalf of the World's WCTU, Strout was commissioned to serve in Japan, 1907–1911. There, she published and circulated several leaflets on temperance. She also addressed large meetings for soldiers, at one, fully a thousand people present. In 1918, she was at Singapore in Straits Settlements, Malaysia, lecturing on behalf of the social purity campaign. This five year commission was largely on behalf of organizing and educational work along scientific temperance lines. Her service area extended to Ceylon (now Sri Lanka) and Burma (now Myanmar). Strout returned home on furlough to Baltimore, Maryland in July 1924 after stop-overs in India, Egypt, and England. On behalf of the World's WCTU, in 1926, she was in Brazil; and in 1940, she was in Cape Town, South Africa and then Trinidad. Her success came from having the ability to absorb the cultures of the foreign countries she visited while working for the World's WCTU (1910–42) as an official round-the-world missionary. She was able to put Christianity aside and focus on the promotion of temperance societies among other religions.

She died in Arlington, Massachusetts, November 5, 1962, and was buried at Mount Auburn Cemetery, Middlesex, Massachusetts.

== Selected works ==
=== Articles ===
- "The Temperance Outlook in Japan", Mission News, 1908
- "Temperance Sentiment Growing among Japanese Young People", The Union Signal, 1910
- "Prohibition Wins in Public Debate at Ceylon's First National Convention", The Union Signal, 1922

=== Lyrics ===
- School anthem, Morgan College (now Morgan State University)
