= Massachusetts Department of Youth Services =

State agency of Massachusetts

The Massachusetts Department of Youth Services (DYS) is a state agency of Massachusetts. Its administrative office is headquartered in 600 Washington Street, Boston. The agency operates the state's juvenile justice services and facilities for incarcerated children.

The DYS regions are the Central, Metro, Northeastern, Southeastern, and Western regions.

== History and leadership ==
Massachusetts created the nation's first publicly funded correctional system for children in 1846 with the opening of the Massachusetts State Reform School for Boys at Westborough, later known as Lyman School for Boys. In 1969 Governor Francis Sargent established the Department of Youth Services as a separate agency under the Executive Office of Health and Human Services. Under the leadership of its first commissioner, Jerome G. Miller, Massachusetts initiated a deinstitutionalization effort with the closure of Lyman School for Boys and the Massachusetts Industrial School for Boys at Shirley. The reforms initiated over forty years ago have proven to be sustainable and remain foundational to the state's juvenile justice system.

From circa 1995, where there were 165 incarcerated girls, to 2005, where there were 453 incarcerated girls, there was a 168% increase in the number of girls committed to DYS.

=== DYS commissioners ===
- Jerome G. Miller, 1969-1973
- Joseph Leavy, 1973-1976
- John Calhoun, 1976-1979
- Edward M. Murphy, 1979-1985
- Edward J. Loughran, 1985-1993
- William D. O'Leary, 1993-1997
- Robert P. Gittens, 1997-2002
- Michael Bolden, 2002-2005
- Jane E. Tewksbury, 2005-2012
- Edward Dolan, 2012–2013
- Peter J. Forbes, 2013-2022
- Cecely Reardon, 2023–present

== Overview ==
DYS operates more than 80 total residential and community programs across Massachusetts, including:

- 63 residential programs, ranging from staff secure group homes to small highly-secure locked jails for boy and girls, and
- 22 district offices to provide supervision and services to youth who live in the community (residing with a parent, guardian, foster parent or residing in an independent living program).

== Continuum of care ==
The Department has a dual mandate of rehabilitation and public safety. In keeping with these two objectives, DYS has a system of classifying committed youth according to their offense patterns and other pertinent history. This classification process informs if children are to be incarcerated or not according to our Continuum of Care. The Continuum of Care includes:

- Bail Detention
- Assessment
- Residential Treatment (Hardware Secure or Staff Secure)
- Community Phase/ Day Reporting
- Discharge

The Client Services unit oversees the delivery of a host of clinical and support services. Using an integrated approach, programs address the risk to re-offend by providing a variety of services, including the following:

- Clinical Services
- Medical and Health Services
- Substance Abuse Services
- Assessment and Classification
- Revocation (the process by which youth in the community is returned to incarceration).

== DYS treatment programs and services ==
=== Clinical services ===
The Massachusetts Department of Youth Services (DYS) provides clinical and rehabilitative services to its detained clients and committed youth based on the Comprehensive Strategy outlined by the Office of Juvenile Delinquency and Prevention.

Dialectical Behavior Therapy (DBT): This system of psychotherapy was adopted to fit the needs of the juvenile justice population by teaching youth skills from DBT skill modules (e.g., skills in emotion regulation and/or interpersonal effectiveness modules) that are basic fundamental skills underlying positive pro-social development. DBT is used as a behavior management tool in DYS to increase skill development in youth, improve relationships between youth and staff and create a positive pro-social learning environment. While DBT is not the only clinical treatment offered in DYS, it does serve as the structure for therapeutic work and for the behavior management system across all DYS programs in the Commonwealth.

Positive Youth Development: The Positive Youth Development model focuses on the positive attributes young people need to make a more successful transition to adulthood. The Positive Youth Development framework revolves around the cognitive, emotional and social needs of a young person. A strong focus on three aspects of positive youth development will provide effective guidance for the goals and plans for each youth's successful re-entry into the community. These include a focus on each youth's strengths and personal assets, providing opportunities for youth empowerment and leadership, and cultivating community partnerships and supports that assist youth in moving successfully through the continuum of care.

Clinical Assessments: Upon commitment to DYS, youth are given a comprehensive assessment conducted by licensed mental health clinicians, licensed teachers and medical and psychiatric staff. Licensed mental health clinicians provide psychosocial interviews, administer psychological testing, and review prior records that include educational, medical and criminal histories. Screening instruments are used to determine if the youth needs to be referred for a comprehensive neuropsychological evaluation to aid in treatment planning. Following the assessment phase, an individual treatment and service plan is developed for the youth that focuses interventions on the youth's strengths and risks factors for re-offending.

Residential Support: The clinical focus in the residential treatment programs is to rehabilitate the youth by preparing him or her to rejoin their community by teaching pro-social attitudes and behaviors. This is done through weekly individual counseling and participation in required group therapies which include: Dialectical Behavior Therapy (twice weekly); substance abuse groups (either prevention or substance abuse treatment groups); and violent offender/sex offender groups which focus on relapse prevention planning. Depending on the individual service needs of the youth, other treatments may be incorporated such as: family counseling, trauma work, teen dating violence prevention, and parenting skills classes for DYS youth with children of their own.

Community Continuum: As the DYS youth transitions from residential treatment to the community, the casework team (which includes licensed mental health clinicians) ensures that the youth and family are enrolled in community-based services to support the gains the youth has made in treatment.

== Facilities ==
Juveniles charged with murder and juveniles with adult sentences are held within a DYS-operated facility inside the Plymouth County Correctional Facility,

Juvenile secure units:

- Plymouth Juvenile Secure Unit

Long term facilities:

- Robert F. Kennedy School (Westborough) - The school and private prison is the most secure juvenile facility in the state. Operated by the Robert F. Kennedy Children's Action Corps, Inc., the center was the first Massachusetts juvenile correctional facility operated by a private provider.
- Springfield Secure Treatment Program (Springfield)
- South Hadley Girls Treatment Program (South Hadley)

Youth service centers:

- Metro Youth Service Center (MYSC) (Dorchester, Boston)
  - Construction was scheduled to be completed in the fiscal year 2000

Reception and detention centers:

- Judge John J. Connelly Youth Center (Boston)
- Reception-Detention Center for Girls (Boston)
- Westfield Detention Center (Westfield)
- Worcester Detention Center (Worcester)

Closed facilities:

- Lyman School for Boys
- Phaneuf Youth Treatment Brockton
- Bishop Ruocco Girls Youth Treatment Lakeville
- Fay A. Rotenberg School (Westborough) - The Rotenberg School was a secure juvenile treatment center for girls that closed in 2016. It was operated by the Robert F. Kennedy Children's Action Corps, Inc. Rotenberg houses most of the adjudicated females deemed to be dangerous, and it was the sole secured facility for female juvenile delinquents in Massachusetts.
  - Rotenberg, which first opened in 1982, previously occupied a building in North Chelmsford, a section of Chelmsford; this facility, which had 16 beds, was located on Princeton Street, near the border with Lowell. In 2006 the school moved to its new location in Westborough. That year Mary Harte, the Rotenberg director, stated that of the detained girls, about 35-40% had previously been victims of commercial sexual exploitation of children.

== See also ==
- Youth services
- Seventeenth Annual Report of the Trustees of the State Reform School at Westborough, 1864 Retrieved on February 27, 2013
- Sixth Annual Report of the Trustees of the Massachusetts Training Schools, 1916 Retrieved February 27, 2013
- Massachusetts Department of Corrections
- List of United States state correction agencies
