= Herbert J. Hoelter =

American consultant (1950–2024)

Herbert Joseph Hoelter (September 20, 1950 – May 2, 2024) was an American criminal justice consultant and prison consultant. The Associated Press and Boston Globe recognized him as a pioneer in the field of federal sentencing mitigation. He is an expert in sentencing, creative alternatives to incarceration and the Federal Bureau of Prisons' Residential Drug Abuse Program (RDAP). He is chairman and CEO of the National Center on Institutions and Alternatives (NCIA), a group he co-founded along with Dr. Jerome G. Miller in 1977.

Hoelter was never himself incarcerated. He preferred "professional federal sentencing consultant", and described his work as assisting with the "transition from freedom to incarceration."

== Background ==
Herbert Joseph Hoelter was born in Yonkers, New York on September 20, 1950, as the third of eight children. He completed his undergraduate studies at the University of Buffalo, earning a Bachelor of Arts. He then obtained a Masters of Social Work from Marywood University in Scranton, Pennsylvania.

Hoelter died from heart failure on May 2, 2024, at the age of 73.

== Career and NCIA ==
Beginning in 1977, Hoelter and the organization he co-founded, NCIA, have worked with criminal defense lawyers in developing client-specific sentencing alternatives for defendants facing sentences in state and federal court. He led the NCIA's sentencing and parole services, which has prepared cases in all 50 states, 75 federal jurisdictions, and three countries. In total, more than 15,000 cases have been presented by the NCIA for consideration by sentencing courts and parole boards.

Prior to sentencing, Hoelter and his colleagues at the NCIA present recommendations for alternative sentences and work on clients' behalf to secure appropriate prison placement, typically minimum security facilities where the risk of violence is low. They also document the circumstances of a crime, and outline the redeeming qualities of the individual to contrast the prosecution's portrayal. Once a sentence has been handed down, the organization works to help inmates assimilate into the culture of prison life from a practical and psychological standpoint. Arrangements and conditions for family visitation, mail, commissary, telephone privileges, and items permitted inside are thoroughly explained.

Hoelter has also advocated for prison reform and creative alternatives to incarceration. He offers alternatives such as work release, community incarceration, drug rehabilitation centers, home detention, community service, and strict probation aided by GPS monitoring. In June 1987 he testified before the United States Sentencing Commission on the issue of alternatives to incarceration, and again submitted testimony to the Sentencing Commission in July 2008 at a national conference on same issue.

== Clients ==
Hoelter focused on white-collar defendants in federal cases, and represented prior to and post sentencing Bernard L. Madoff, Martha Stewart, Michael Vick, Michael Milken, Leona Helmsley, Lewis "Scooter" Libby and Mike Tyson, as well as politicians, foreign nationals, husband wife or family defendants, independent business people and Wall Street executives such as Ivan Boesky, Dennis B. Levine, and James McDermott. He is also a speaker, and provides testimony to government panels and professional and academic audiences on the criminal justice system and punishment alternatives that do not involve imprisonment.

He also provided consulting services for a number of Enron executives in the early 1990s. Since 2000 he has worked with criminal defense attorneys Ira Sorkin and Billy Martin (lawyer).

Hoelter advised Bernard L. Madoff on medical care, before Madoff began a 150-year federal prison sentence for financial crime. While acknowledging the havoc caused by Madoff's fraudulent activities, Hoelter described the sentence as "the crown jewel" for the federal government and one imposed for "symbolic purposes."

In the majority of cases featuring well-known clients, Hoelter managed to develop court-approved sentencing proposals which produced more lenient sentences featuring substantial amounts of community service and home confinement. When clients received more stringent prison terms, as was the case for Vick, Hoelter worked to help the client resume life outside of prison, focusing on re-entry back into society.

== Sentencing database ==
To develop a better understanding of federal sentencing history, Hoelter and the NCIA in 2008 completed analysis of a computerized data collection maintained by The United States Sentencing Commission. The database is housed at the University of Michigan. NCIA reviewed the data sets for fiscal years 1999–2009. The information generated by the NCIA's review is intended as a frame of reference for judges deciding fines and imprisonment terms.
