= Jerome G. Miller =

American academic (1931–2015)

- Born: Jerome Gilbert Miller; December 8, 1931; Wahpeton, North Dakota
- Died: August 7, 2015 (aged 83); Woodstock, Virginia
- Education: Maryknoll Seminary, Loyola University Chicago, The Catholic University of America
- Occupations: Social service administrator & reformer, clinical social worker, author
- Known for: Reform of juvenile and adult corrections systems and advocacy for alternatives to incarceration and institutionalization
- Spouse: Charlene Coleman Miller
- Website: institutions/etc institetc.wordpress.com

Jerome Gilbert Miller (December 8, 1931 – August 7, 2015) was an American social worker, academic and public sector corrections administrator, who was an authority on the reform of juvenile and adult corrections systems. He was a prominent advocate for alternatives to incarceration for offenders as well as for the de-institutionalization of individuals with developmental disabilities. His career involved university teaching, administration of juvenile justice services for three states, clinical work with offenders and advocacy for systemic change in public sector correctional services. Miller's work first drew national attention for his leadership in closing several juvenile reformatories in Massachusetts in the early 1970s. Miller went on to emerge as a prominent national advocate, administrator and educator working for systemic change in public sector corrections and disability service delivery systems. He was the co-founder of the National Center on Institutions and Alternatives.

== Early years ==
Jerome Gilbert Miller was born on December 8, 1931, and grew up in Wahpeton, North Dakota. His parents were George Miller, a high school music teacher, and the former Beatrice Butts. He earned academic degrees from Maryknoll Seminary, Glen Ellyn, Il (B.A., 1954), Loyola University Chicago (M.S.W., 1957) and The Catholic University of America (D.S.W., 1965). After his undergraduate studies, he spent a year in a Maryknoll novitiate in Bedford, Massachusetts. Miller's doctoral studies concentrated in psychiatric social work, and he was qualified as a licensed clinical social worker.

== Career ==
Miller was an associate professor in the School of Social Work at Ohio State University, when in 1969 he was chosen by Massachusetts Governor Francis Sargent to serve as the Commissioner of the Massachusetts Department of Youth Services (DYS).

=== Massachusetts experiment ===
Within three years of leading DYS, Miller had shut down the state's two juvenile reformatories in favor of community based alternatives to incarceration. The first closure involving Lyman School for Boys in 1971, caught many juvenile justice professionals in the state by surprise. Lyman School was the first reformatory for delinquent adolescent boys to be established in the United States. Anticipating the possible closure of the Massachusetts Industrial School for Boys at Shirley, various forces tried to mobilize against it, but Miller was successful in closing the school in 1972. Highly controversial at the time, and still debated today, the basic deinstitutionalization reforms implemented by Miller in the state's juvenile justice services forty years ago are still in place today.

=== Alternatives to incarceration ===
Recognized as a successful reformer capable of taking on entrenched state-level systems overly reliant on institutionalizing children and adolescents, Miller moved to Illinois in 1973 to serve as the director of Children and Family Services and then to Pennsylvania in 1975 to serve as the Commissioner of Children and Youth. From 1989 to 1994 Miller was the jail and prison monitor for Judge Howell W. Melton in the United States District Court for the Middle District of Florida. From 1995 to 1997 Miller served as the court appointed receiver for Washington D.C.'s child welfare system. As a leader and reformer in these jurisdictions, he sought to address and overcome the traumatizing consequences of incarceration, to maximize the use of community resources as alternatives to imprisonment, to lower the disproportionate rates of locking up youth of color, to reduce recidivism by improving offender outcomes and to reduce unsustainable costs associated with escalating levels of incarceration.

=== National Center for Institutions and Alternatives ===
In 1977, together with Herbert J. Hoelter, Miller co-founded the National Center for Institutions and Alternatives (NCIA). The focus of NCIA involves sentencing advocacy, parole release advocacy and developing credible alternatives to incarceration and institutionalization. Miller has written and lectured widely on juvenile and adult corrections and strategies for promoting and implementing systemic reforms that utilize community-based alternatives to replace counterproductive and financially unsustainable institutionalization of offenders and developmentally disabled patients. Miller also served as the founder and clinical director of NCIA's Augustus Institute for Mental Health, named for John Augustus, known as the 'father of probation' for his pioneering efforts to promote offender rehabilitation in the United States.

Miller died on August 7, 2015, in Woodstock, Virginia.

== Impact ==
Jerome Miller's dramatic closure of two juvenile reformatories in Massachusetts in the early 1970s launched a forty-year career as a pioneering administrator, educator and advocate for alternative models for responding to offenders and developmentally disabled persons. Miller's capacity to articulate the need for reform, to envision models for systems transformation and ability to implement institutional change have been widely acknowledged, sometimes condemned and often praised. Reflecting on Miller's impact on juvenile justice reform efforts in the early 1970s, Dan Macallair, executive director of the Center on Juvenile and Criminal Justice, wrote, "The closing of the Massachusetts reform schools stands as the premier event in the history of American juvenile justice reform.... Miller set the course for the 21st century juvenile justice system and secured his place among history's great reformers."

== Published works ==
=== Books ===
- Last One Over the Wall: The Massachusetts Experiment in Closing Reform Schools. Ohio State University Press, 1991. ISBN 0814205348 (winner of the Edward Sagarin Prize of the American Society of Criminology)
- Miller, Jerome G. (1993). African American Males in the Criminal Justice System.
- Search and Destroy: African-American Males in the Criminal Justice System. Cambridge University Press, July 1996. ISBN 9780521460217

=== Articles & lectures ===
- American Guluag - Why does the "home of the free" lock up 2 million men, women, boys and girls-most of them people of color? yesmagazine.org, Sept. 30, 2000, Retrieved 24 January 2013
- Hobbling a Generation: Young African American Men in Washington, D.C.'s Criminal Justice System - Five Years Later, Crime & Delinquency, July 1998, 44: 355-366
- Riding the Crime Wave, Why Words We Use Matter So Much Nieman Reports, Winter 1998, Retrieved 12 March 2013
- Alternatives to Incarceration: A Dream Deferred, University of South Dakota, Governmental Research Bureau, 1994, Public Affairs, Issue 103
- The Debate on Rehabilitating Criminals: Is It True that Nothing Works? Washington Post, March 1989, prisonpolicy.org
- Magnificent Illusion: The Professional Social Worker’s Search for Asylum, Jerome G. Miller, 9th Annual Konopka Lecture, University of Minnesota, May 1986, Retrieved 24 January 2013

== See also ==
- National Center on Institutions and Alternatives, website
- Center on Juvenile and Criminal Justice
- Juvenile Detention Alternatives Initiative at the Annie W. Casey Foundation
- The Massachusetts Juvenile Justice System of the 1990s: Re-Thinking a National Model Boston Bar Association, Retrieved 9 March 2013
