= Plymouth County Correctional Facility =

Prison in Plymouth, Massachusetts

Coordinates: 41°55′55″N 70°39′04″W

- Interactive map of Plymouth County Correctional Facility
- Location: Plymouth, MA
- Capacity: 1,140 Inmates
- Opened: 1994

Plymouth County Correctional Facility is located in Plymouth, Massachusetts operated by the Plymouth County Sheriff's Department. The prison is the largest prison in Plymouth. The prison is known for housing several celebrity inmates, most notably Survivor winner Richard Hatch, shoe-bomber Richard Reid, former President of Liberia Charles Taylor, reputed Boston mob boss James "Whitey" Bulger, as well as multiple murderer Gary Sampson, and former New England crime boss Francis "Cadillac Frank" Salemme.

Juveniles charged with murder and juveniles with adult sentences are held within a Massachusetts Department of Youth Services-operated facility inside the Plymouth County Correctional Facility.
