= Maples Cottage =

Historic house in Massachusetts, United States

- U.S. National Register of Historic Places
- U.S. Historic district – Contributing property
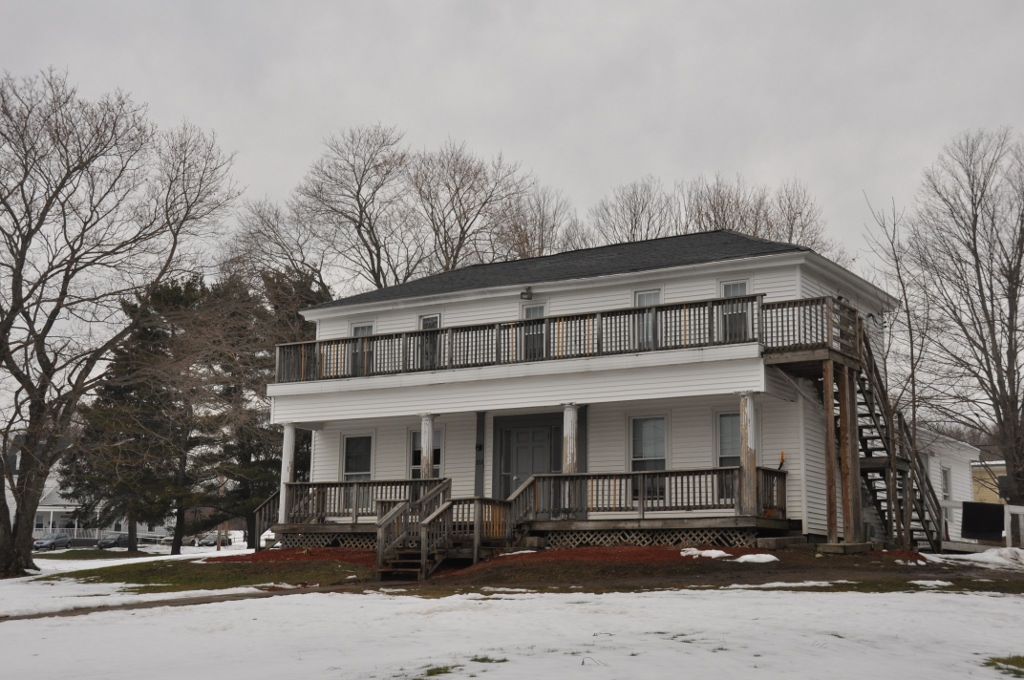

- Location within Massachusetts Location within the United States
- Nearest city: 155 Oak Street, Westborough, Massachusetts
- Coordinates: 42°17′8″N 71°37′38″W
- Built: 1830
- Architectural style: Greek Revival, Federal
- Part of: Lyman School for Boys (ID94000693)
- NRHP reference No.: 80001681

Significant dates
- Added to NRHP: March 25, 1980
- Designated CP: July 25, 1994

Maples Cottage is a historic cottage in Westborough, Massachusetts, USA. Located on the former grounds of the Lyman School for Boys, this Greek Revival cottage was built in 1832 by Rev. William White on the site of a 1725 parsonage. The property was acquired by the state in 1884, and used as part of the reform school, which is now closed. The building has lost most of its exterior Greek Revival styling (see photo).

The cottage was listed on the National Register of Historic Places in 1980, and included in the historic district encompassing the Lyman School in 1994.

== See also ==
- National Register of Historic Places listings in Worcester County, Massachusetts
