= Center on Juvenile and Criminal Justice =

- Abbreviation: CJCJ
- Formation: 1985
- Founder: Jerome G. Miller
- Headquarters: San Francisco, California
- Fields: Juvenile justice, Criminal Justice
- Director: Daniel Macallair
- Senior research fellow: Mike A. Males
- Board of directors: https://www.cjcj.org/About/team
- Parent organization: National Center on Institutions and Alternatives
- Staff: 35-40 (2016)
- Website: www.cjcj.org

The Center on Juvenile and Criminal Justice is a San Francisco-based nonprofit organization dedicated to reducing the United States' reliance on incarceration. It was established in 1985 by Jerome G. Miller as the San Francisco branch of the National Center on Institutions and Alternatives, and established as a separate 501(c)3 nonprofit organization in 1991.

== See also ==
- Alternatives to incarceration
- Criminal justice
- Juvenile delinquency
- Victimology
