= James McDermott (business executive) =

American businessman

James J. McDermott Jr. was the former CEO and chairman of Keefe, Bruyette & Woods. He was arrested and charged with insider trading in December 1999 by federal authorities. According to reporters for the Wall Street Journal, "it was the first time a former head of a reputable securities firm has faced such charges by the SEC." During his trial in April 2000, the prosecution charged McDermott with providing his mistress, Kathryn Gannon, "confidential non-public information" about his banking firm's merger and acquisitions. Gannon, a pornographic film actress who used the name Marylin Star, then bought and sold stocks based on the tips. A jury found McDermott guilty along with his co-defendant, New Jersey businessman, Anthony Pomponio, who was also in a relationship with Gannon.

In August 2000, McDermott was sentenced by US District Court judge Kimba Wood to 8 months in prison, 300 hours of community service and a $25,000 fine. Wood said the sentence was light due to his entering alcohol treatment as well as to aid his eldest daughter's recovery from a condition.

In June 2001, McDermott's conviction was overturned by the US Second Circuit Court of Appeals. McDermott then pled guilty to insider trading to avoid a retrial and was sentenced to the five months time he had already served.

McDermott's siblings sued him in 2009 on grounds that he had allegedly taken the family trust while his mother was in a nursing home with Alzheimer's.
