= Reform school =

19th century juvenile reformatory

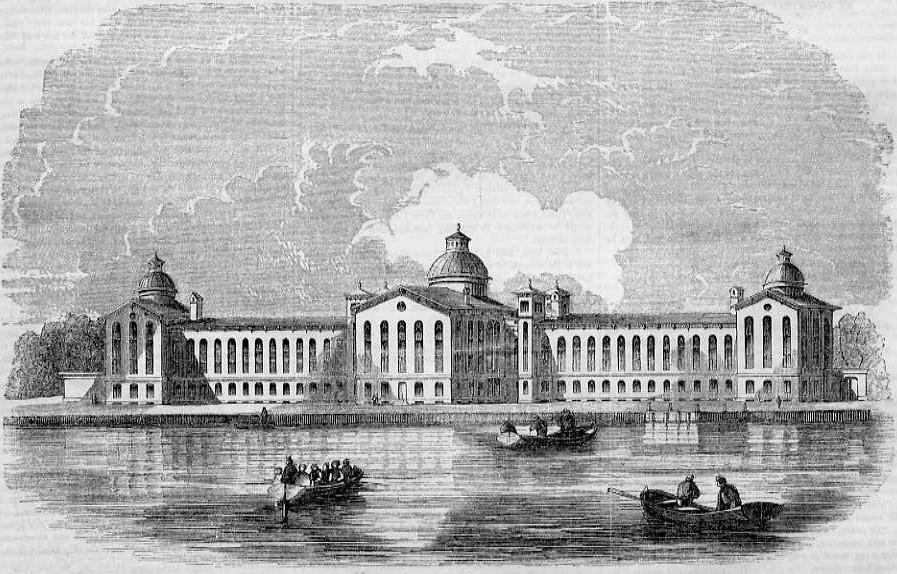
New York House of Refuge, a reform school completed in 1854

A reform school was a penal institution, generally for teenagers, mainly operating between 1830 and 1900. In the United Kingdom and its colonies, reformatories (commonly called reform schools) were set up from 1854 onward for children who were convicted of a crime, as an alternative to an adult prison. In parallel, industrial schools were set up for vagrants and children needing protection. Both were 'certified' by the government from 1857 onward, and in 1932, the systems merged and both were 'approved' and became approved schools.

Both in the United Kingdom and the United States, they came out of social concerns about cities, poverty, immigration and vagrancy following industrialization, as well as from a shift in society's attitude from retribution (punishing the miscreant) to reforming.

They were distinct from borstals (UK; 1902–1982), which were enclosed juvenile prisons.

== History ==
=== United States ===
Social reformers in America during the late 19th and early 20th centuries almost invariably found fault with the then-usual practice of treating juvenile offenders essentially the same as adult criminals. It was recognized that the juveniles were often sexually and/or otherwise exploited by the older inmates, and that they were often receiving instruction in more advanced and serious ways of crime by hardened criminals. As a result, rather than their sentences serving as a deterrent to future crimes, many juvenile offenders emerged from incarceration far worse than when they were first sentenced.

The reforms, which were adopted more readily in some states than others, consisted of a two-pronged approach – a separate juvenile code and juvenile courts for offenders who had not reached the age of majority, and the building of separate institutions for juvenile "delinquents" (the stigmatizing term "criminal" not being used). Since the primary purpose of these institutions was to be rehabilitative rather than punitive, they were styled "reform schools". For the most part, these institutions were custodial.

=== United Kingdom ===
In the United Kingdom, reformatory schools were provided for criminal children, whilst industrial schools were intended to prevent vulnerable children from becoming criminals. There was a perceived rise in juvenile delinquency during the early 19th century; whereas in a rural economy young children could gain paid employment doing tasks such as bird scaring and stone gathering, these opportunities were not available in the cities. Children were very visible on the streets. In 1816, Parliament set up a ‘Committee for Investigating the Alarming Increase in Juvenile Crime in the Metropolis’; in 1837, the writer Charles Dickens published Oliver Twist, a story about a child involved in a street gang; and it was recognised in the Juvenile Offences Act 1846 that children under 14 should be tried in a special court, not an adult court. Begging and vagrancy were rife, and it was these low-level misdemeanours that caused the magistrates to send children to industrial schools to learn to be industrious, and learn skills that would make then more employable.

More serious crimes required an element of punishment in an environment away from older prisoners, followed by education to reform their ways. The power to set up such an establishment was given in the Youthful Offenders Act 1854 (the Reformatory Schools Act). This provided financial assistance and support for reformatory schools as an alternative to prison. Industrial schools were regularised three years later by the Industrial Schools Act 1857.

=== Australia ===
In Australia, reform schools were established by the Neglected and Criminal Children Act 1864, which provided for children who came under state guardianship. In theory, children who were considered 'neglected' were sent to an industrial school, while those who had broken the law were sent to a reformatory. In practice however, older children tended to be sent to reformatories and younger ones to industrial schools, with little regard as to why they had been committed. The over-crowding and insanitary conditions of these schools, combined with poor diets and overwork, caused terrible health problems. Contagious disease was a big problem, particularly measles and eye diseases. The reform school system came to an end on 1887, due to public pressure, and government shifted its focus towards the use of foster homes.

In the 1950s and 1960s, many of the same problems that had occurred with the former system of incarcerating juveniles along with adults began to be noticed in reform school — older juveniles exploiting the younger ones, sexually and otherwise, and the younger ones taking the more hardened, usually older offenders as role models and mentors. Also, the term "reform school" itself, originally intended as destigmatizing, had developed its own stigma.

=== Switzerland ===
Reform schools (Note: German: Erziehungsheime; French: Ecoles de redressement; Italian: Istituti di rieducazione) were part of Switzerland's institutional confinement system from the mid-19th century onwards, primarily housing adolescents aged 13 to 20. Throughout the 20th century, between 30 and 80 such gender-segregated establishments existed, operated by cantons, municipalities, and religious organizations, with the majority located in German-speaking Switzerland. These institutions had both punitive and corrective functions and offered vocational training, distinguishing them from children's homes and forced labor establishments. Young men were trained in agriculture, crafts, and later metalworking, while young women received training in domestic economy, needlework, and laundry work. Until the early 1970s, institutionalized young women were forced to work for Swiss manufacturing companies in factories within the homes.

Daily life was strictly structured with harsh disciplinary systems including head shaving, food deprivation, and solitary confinement for rule violations. The isolation of these closed institutions facilitated psychological, physical, and sexual violence by staff and other residents, while the lack of trust in external authorities deterred victims from reporting abuse. Family contacts were heavily regulated and often restricted as punishment. The institutions' denominational character influenced their educational concepts, though after World War II, lay management became more common and standardization increased in staff training and infrastructure.

The May 1968 movement and the ''Heimkampagne'' of 1971-1972, launched by Zurich youth activists, catalyzed reforms in institutional child welfare. Critical research began in the 1970s at the University of Zurich, and from the late 1980s, autobiographical publications by survivors stimulated historical and social science interest. Research emphasizes that traumatic experiences in reform schools marked former residents for life and sometimes caused intergenerational consequences.

== Modern view ==
As of 2026, no state officially refers to its juvenile correctional institutions as "reform schools", although such institutions still exist. The attempt has also been made to reduce the population of such institutions to the maximum extent possible, and to leave all but the most incorrigible youths in a home setting. Also, in an attempt to make the situation more socially normal, and in response to the rising number of young female offenders, many such institutions have been made coeducational. The current approach involves minimizing the use of custodial institutions and the maximization of the use of less-restrictive settings which allow the youths to remain in their own homes, usually while attending during the daytime an institution called an alternative school or something similar, which is usually a more-structured version of a public school. There may be court-monitored probation or other restrictions, such as a strict curfew applied to the clientele of the "Department of Youth Services" or whatever the state terms it, than for other youths the same age.

In the United States, the most well-known facilities meeting the general criteria for being colloquially labelled "reform schools" include the Lincoln Hills School near Merrill, Wisconsin and the Preston School of Industry in Ione, California. The first publicly funded reform school in the United States was the State Reform School for Boys in Westborough, Massachusetts. It opened in 1848.

In Denmark, continuation high schools continue to be used as reform schools as they are much cheaper than youth detention centers, while the success rates are much the same. Today, there are no national guidelines regarding the severity of the crimes with which the children are charged; nor are there any guidelines in place to assist in the decision to send them to reform school in the first place, since each town or jurisdiction has its own bylaws and budgets. Children charged with making bomb threats end up in such places.

== See also ==
- Alternative school
- Continuation high school
- George Junior Republic
- Therapeutic boarding school
