= State Reform School for Boys =

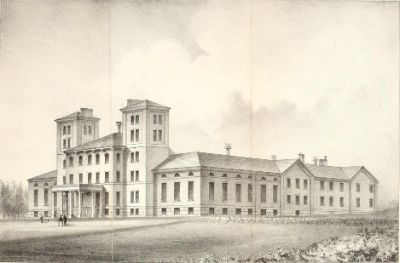
- As seen from 1848 to 1852

General information
- Status: Closed
- Type: Institutional
- Location: Westborough, Massachusetts, United States
- Coordinates: 42.300698°N 71.608960°W
- Construction started: July 1847
- Opened: November 1, 1848
- Inaugurated: December 7, 1848
- Relocated: April 1884
- Renovated: 1853 / 1877
- Closed: April 1884
- Cost: $52,000 ($1,479,000 in 2015 dollars)
- Renovation cost: $50,000 / $90,000
- Owner: State of Massachusetts

Technical details
- Material: Foundation-Stone, Exterior-Brick, Roof-Slate

Design and construction
- Architects: Elias Carter of Springfield, James Savage of Southborough
- Main contractor: Mr. Daniel Davies of Boston
- Known for: First publicly funded Reform School in the US

The State Reform School for Boys in Westborough, Massachusetts was a state institution for the reformation of juvenile offenders from 1848 to 1884. Originally conceived the facility was built to house up to 300 young boys but by 1852 an addition was added to house an additional 300 inmates. By 1857, there were 614 inmates at the reform school.

After a devastating fire in 1859, that consumed half of the building and was set by one of the inmates, the school created a nautical branch to house some of the older boys on school ships. The youngest boys were housed in an old mill in the nearby village while some remained in what was left of the Reform School.

By 1861 what was left of the Reform School was rebuilt and 3 "trust houses" were built, each holding approximately 30 boys. The "trust houses" as an experiment in juvenile reform in which boys were placed in a family setting known as the "cottage system". By 1872, the nautical branch was disbanded and in 1877 a "correctional" addition was added to the original building to house the older boys. After a riot broke out in 1877, information leaked to the media about cruel and unnecessarily severe punishment of the boys. Legislative hearings were held and the abuses uncovered were denounced by many in the public.

By 1880 the legislature, having deemed the Reform School a failed experiment in a congregate setting, and needing additional space for an overcrowded institutional system for the insane, used the land and the buildings to establish the Westborough Insane Hospital. By 1884, the State Reform School for Boys was relocated a couple of miles away, in Westborough, and renamed the Lyman School for Boys being established under the "cottage system".

It is widely written that the Reform School for Boys in Westborough was the first juvenile reform school to be built in the United States. This is somewhat misleading as there were several reform schools built before 1848 including; The Boston Farm School (1833) and the New York House of Refuge (1824) that were either private or corporate institutions. The State Reform School for Boys in Westborough is believed to be the oldest publicly funded reform school in the United States.

== Juvenile reform school movement ==
The reform movement for juveniles began in the United States in 1824 with the founding of the House of Refuge in New York City. In 1826, the Philadelphia House of Refuge was built, and in 1827 the House of Reformation for juvenile offenders in Boston was established. These early attempts at reforming child criminals were spawned from work previously done in England and of the Society for the Improvement of Prison Discipline and for the Reformation of Juvenile Offenders (1815). In New York, the Society for the Prevention of Pauperism was established in (1818) later reorganized as The Society for the Reformation of Juvenile Delinquents (1823).

These organizations were founded on the principals that children under the age of 17, convicted of a crime punishable by imprisonment, should not be put in jail among older hardened criminals. They should be reformed of their criminal ways by moral, religious, academic and vocational education in a setting more resembling a home environment than a prison environment.

== Massachusetts vision 1846–47 ==
Early in 1846, a petition from magistrates and citizens of the Commonwealth was brought before the General Court asking for the creation of a state institution for the reformation of juvenile offenders. A committee was appointed to consider the matter and on February 20, 1846, a circular was issued containing 9 questions regarding the formation of a reform school. (Note: The commissioners circular as it appeared in 1848) The answers received from the citizens convinced the committee of the need for such an institution. April 16, 1846, the governor was authorized to appoint 3 commissioners to purchase land, erect a building and establish a system of governance for the first public institution of its kind.

Theodore Lyman ll, former governor of Boston, answered the committees circular. (Note: Theodore Lyman's response to the commissions circular in 1848) Mr. Lyman was particularly interested in the subject of a State Reform School, having been president of the board of managers of the Farm School at Thompson's Island. Mr. Lyman donated $30,000 for the purposes of purchasing land and erecting a building for the purpose. Later in his will, he would donate an additional $20,000. (Note: Extracts from Theodore Lyman's Will)

In 1847, the commissioners purchased the farm of Lovett Peters in Westborough containing 180 acres situated on the north side of Chauncy Lake for $9000. Soon after, the farm and land across the road was purchased by the Trustees for $3500. Shortly after opening the school and additional 23 acres was purchased, west of the main building from the Warren Farm for a total of 280 acres.

On June 15, 1847, the contract for the building was given to the lowest bidder, Mr Daniel Davies of Boston, for $52,000 with a stipulation that the contract completion date would be December 1848. On that same day, the commissioners selected the location, on the 180-acre old Peters Farm, where the building would be erected.

The institution was built to accommodate 300 students, with apartments for the superintendent and his family; rooms for other persons employed; a chapel; hospital, offices, 7 "solitaire dormitories" for disciplined, school rooms, workshops and sleeping dormitories. The foundations of the building were built with stones, the walls were brick and the roof was slated. (Note: The basement floor plans of the original buildings) (Note: The 1st and 2nd Floor Plan of the original building)

== Governing structure ==
Legislature

- The Legislature would appropriate yearly budgets for the institution, appropriate special budgets and pass general laws regarding the reform school based upon recommendations of the Trustees and Superintendent.

Governor

- The Governor would appointment of Trustees and Board Members

Board of State Charities

- The Board of State Charities would investigate and supervise the whole system of public charitable and correctional institutions of the State and make such recommendations, changes and additional provisions as they may deem necessary for the economical and efficient administration of those institutions. (Note: List of State Institutions under their supervision in 1864)

Board of Trustees

- The 7 member volunteer board of trustees would hire superintendents and other officers, make monthly visits and hold monthly meetings to review the operations of the institutions. They would manage the Lyman and Mary Lamb funds for the betterment of the institution. Make recommendations to the legislature regarding funding and additional laws that may be warranted. Transfer inmates between charitable institutions and coordinate the selection of inmates and masters for the indentured servant program. (Note: List of Trustees that served from 1848 through 1883) (Note: By Laws for the government and regulations of the State Reform School)

Superintendent

- The superintendent's responsibilities were the management of the facilities, inmates and all those employed within it. (Note: List of Superintendents that served from 1848 through 1883)

== Dedication ==
On the December 7, 1848, Emory Washburn of Lowell gave an address to members of government and many other citizens assembled from the varies portions of the commonwealth at the new Reform School in Westborough.

Excerpts of the Address

The experiment which is here begun is full of interest to every generous mind. It represents the state in her true relation, of a parent seeking out her erring children, and laying aside the stern severity of Justice while struggling for their reform.

There is a fitness that this first experiment, in this country by an entire body politic, to reform the young by an institution for punitive discipline, should be made by Massachusetts.

It is proposed, by schools like this, to remove those from the reach of temptation, so far as may be, who have been led astray by the undisciplined passions of youth, or the more resistless power of corrupt associates, by educating and training them to useful trades and employment, and thereby giving them the means of acquiring personal independence. It is proposed, by the discipline which awaits them here, to quicken the torpid actions of conscience, by calling into play the moral sentiments which have been suffered to lie dormant.

The measures adopted by its trustees in, among other things, the selection of its superintendent - so vital to its success - form an additional guarantee to the public, that, if the experiment fails, it must be from causes intrinsically incident to such a work, and not from anyone of interest or capacity on the part of those to whom its concerns have been confided. May the work go prosperously on! May the priceless, immortal souls that are to be subjected to human discipline through this institution, be purified from the stains by which they have been polluted, and set free from the bondage of Vice in which they have been enslaved! We commend the school, with its officers and inmates, to a generous and grateful public, with the trust that the future lies of the Young who may be sent either for correction and reform, may prove the crowning glory of an enterprise so auspiciously begun.

== Early years 1848–59 ==
Superintendents:

- William R. Lincoln (1848–53)
- James M. Talcott (1853–57)
- William E. Starr (1857–61)

The early years were marked by rapid expansion and an ever-evolving inmate governance. The practical workings of the institution were founded on the daily participation of the inmates in education, industrious or agricultural work, religious teachings, and preparing them for an apprenticeship with minimal time for recreation or idle time. The washing, ironing, and cooking were done by the boys as well as making and mending their own clothes. The farm was to be a centerpiece of the work experience at the Reform School. It was thought that young boys would prosper from the knowledge and physical labor of working on the farm. Additionally, it was hoped that a well-managed farm with good soil and abundant free labor could help defray the cost of the Reform School.

At the time of admittance, the boys were classified by age, temperance, education level and physical abilities. This fundamental classification system would allow for grouping of boys in the dormitories by age, in the classroom by prior education levels, and for working in groups, temperance, and physical abilities would be considered. Additionally, a grading system for conduct was adopted consisting of 4 grades designated as 1 through 4. When a boy was admitted he was placed in the third grade and overtime if his conduct was bad he was degraded, as a punishment, to the 4th; if his conduct was good he was promoted to the second. The first grade had a subdivision called "truth and honor" which was the highest rank available. This system was applied to their conduct while in the schoolroom, in the shop, on the playground or on the farm. For punishment, they were degraded from a higher to lower rank and for encouragement promoted from a lower to higher rank. Many privileges were granted for good conduct including excursions on the lake in a boat in summer or sledding and skating in winter.

A grading system, for the School Department, was used by dividing the students into four grades designated 1 through 4. First grade was for beginners in reading and taught basic reading. The second grade was for students who could read easy words and they primarily studied reading and spelling. The third grade was for students who could read ordinary passages; they were taught reading, spelling, arithmetic and geography. The 4th grade was for students who could read and spell well in class and they studied arithmetic geography and grammar. These classification and grading systems would evolve over time as the Reform School changed and best practices were better understood.

The typical day for an inmate would start at 5 a.m.. After attending to their morning duties they would attend the religious exercise of the morning. Breakfast would be served from 6 to 7 a.m.; labor from 7 to 10 a.m.; and school from 10 to 12 a.m.. Lunch and play was reserved from 12 to 1 p.m.; work from 1 to 4 p.m. and supper and play from 4 to 5 p.m.. Schooling would take place from 5 to 7 p.m. From 7 p.m. to bedtime was used for examination of the days misdemeanors; moral instruction and devotional exercises.

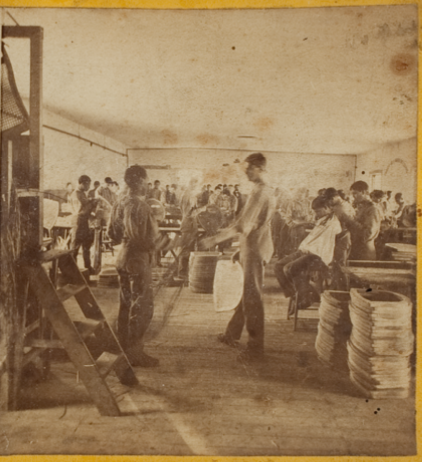
Boys making chairs in the workshop (1871)

The labor of the boys was divided into three categories farming, mechanical and domestic.

Farming included labor on the farm and garden, labor in the gardens of the neighbors, and all of other outdoor laborers around the building. It also included hauling coal from the train station, two and a half miles away in the village of Westborough. After the new tracks of the Agricultural Branch Railroad were opened to Northborough in 1855, the coal was hauled from the State Farm Station about 1 mile from the institution.

The mechanical employment included working in the shoe-making shop and in the sewing and knitting shop. The domestic employment included ironing and washing, baking and cooking, scrubbing and the miscellaneous work inside the building.

The original building was designed to accommodate two separate workshops for the purpose of teaching the boys a mechanical skill as well as creating commodities of value that could be sold. These workshops were not originally fitted up with tooling for any particular trade as this decision was deferred until the institution was up and running. After much deliberation in 1849, it was decided that they would have a shoe shop and a sewing and knitting shop the latter would be run by the matron and the former would be overseen by a person proficient in the trade of making and repairing shoes in boots.

The smallest boys were typically placed in the sewing shop where they work daily on making all the necessary clothing for 300 boys as well as all the bedding, bed ticks, towels, pillows, curtains, aprons and the like.

The larger boys were taught in the shoe shop to manufacture shoes and close both shoes and boots. These were made not only for the boys in the institution but they were also sold. (Note: The number of boys working at varies duties in 1849)

By 1852, the State Reform School was contracting the shoe shop work out to a local business. A contract would be made with a shoe manufacturer and they would provide all the material and oversight. The reform school would provide the workshop and the labor of the boys. The shoe manufacturer would pay the State .10c per boy per day. The boys would make nothing off this arrangement.

By 1855, the business of shoe making was all but suspended due to a decline in demand for shoes and boots. Additionally, the labor for the sewing and knitting shop was decreased as well. These boys were put to other light work instead of being left idle.

In 1856, a chair seating department was added. For the year 111 boys worked here producing 27,000 seat and 2100 backs.

=== Building Addition 1853 ===
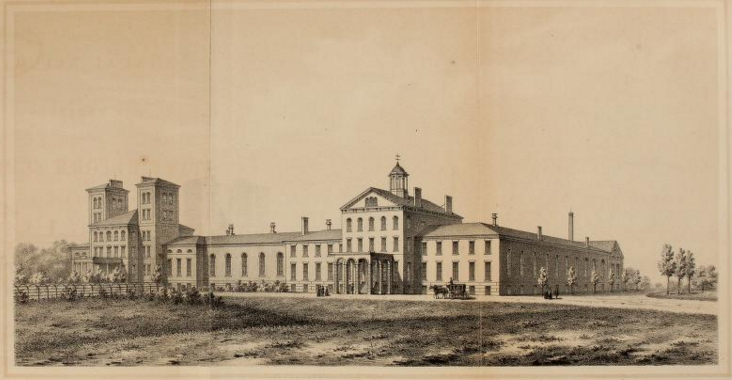
As seen from 1853 to 1859

In March 1852, the legislature approved expenditures for the enlargement of the state reform school from 300 to 600 inmates. At that time the board of trustees were authorized to direct the erection of the building and by June of that year construction commenced. The new edition was dedicated on November 3, 1853, with a dedication speech from Nathaniel P Banks in the presence of a large company distinguished guests and residents of Westborough and its vicinity.

The new addition measures to 225 feet on the front and rear and 200 feet on the east end. It has a chapel to accommodate 600 boys, large school rooms, a well arranged hospital department and accommodations for the officers and assistants necessary for the care and instruction of 300 boys. This addition was completed at a cost of $54,000. By the end of September in 1856, there were 614 inmates in the State Reform School.

The chapel was completed along with the addition of 1853. Conveniently located between the original building and the new addition it was easily accessed from either department. It was large enough to accommodate 600 boys with a balcony area. The chapel was heated by a furnace, it was well ventilated and lighted with large windows supplied with blinds and furnished with comfortable settees. The chapel was used for the morning devotional exercises, for the Sunday school and worshiping. Every Sunday the reform school would send a carriage to the village of Westborough to transport chaplains from different churches and faith to help conduct Sunday school at the chapel. During the reconstruction of the chapel, after the fire of 1859, 14 cells were installed in the basement for the detainment and discipline the boys for their offenses. This area was known as the lodge.

The third department was an area of the new building created to house the more hardened, boys segregated and isolated from the others. The third department consisted of 20 cells (lodges) and a workshop. The boys in the third department would work 8 hours a day in the workshop and for the rest of the day and night would be spent in their "lodge" where they would eat, read and sleep except twice a day they would be taken to the yard when no other boys were present. The discipline in this department was stricter than the other departments but the food was the same as the other boys are fed. Time spent in the lodge was determined by the individual boys behavior.

=== Agricultural experiment 1854–59 ===
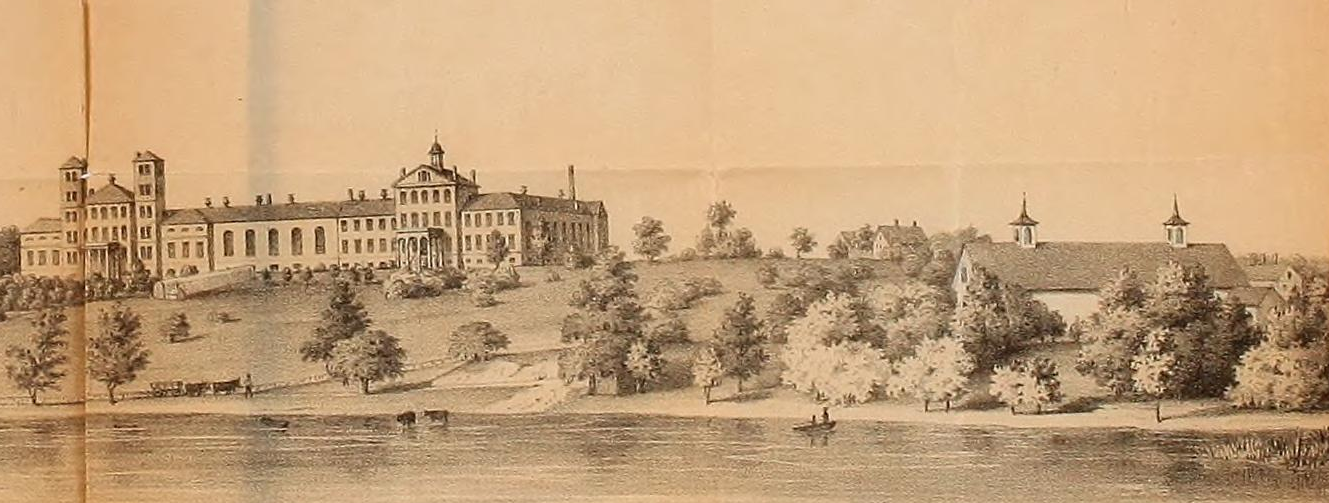
Artist rendering of the Reform School showing the farm barn and agricultural landscape

At a meeting of the State Board of Agriculture held on May 12, 1853, a committee was formed to determine if the Board of agriculture could conveniently use the farm at the State Reform School for scientific experiments in the cultivation of the soil and in the raising of livestock. The committee, after referring to the governor, reported favorably to a leasing arrangement with the board of trustees of the Reform School. The purpose of the arrangement as stated in the agreement was too:

Relieve the trustees of the state reform school of the care and management of the agricultural portion of the establishment at Westborough, to provide an experimental farm for the Board of Agriculture, and to purchase greater facilities for the employment and instruction of the inmates of the reform school in agriculture and horticulture… while the products of the farm shall continue to be applied for the use of the school substantially as they were while the farm was under the immediate control of the board of trustees.

By an act of the legislature of February 27, 1854, an agreement between the board of trustees of the state reform school and the Department of Agriculture for the transfer of all operations of the farm to the Department of Agriculture for 5 years was approved. On April 1, 1854 all land associated with the State Reform School, with the exception the main building and its immediate vicinity; livestock, produce and farming utensils were transferred. The agreement stipulated that all child labor used on the farm would be payable to the institution at a rate of $0.10 a day for each boy. All milk, vegetables, beef, pork and other produce supplied to the institution would be charged at the usual prices in the neighborhood. All improvements made to the farm and land by the Department of Agriculture would not be billed. In 1855, the agreement was modified to specify that 150 boys would be employed on the farm each workday during the season. In the first couple of years of the management of the farm the boys were primarily used for permanent improvements to the farm, that were desperately needed. By 1857 200 boys a day was employed on the farm and they were instructed in the details of practical farming.

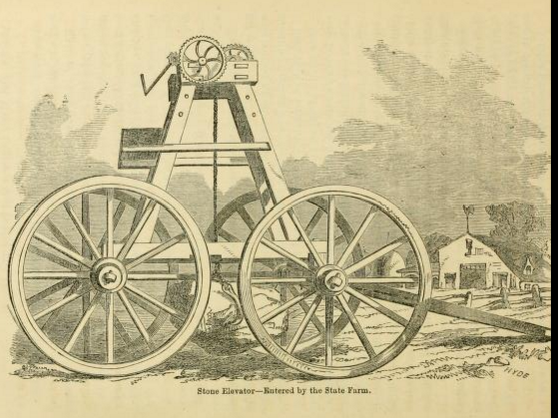
A "Stone Elevator", used for lifting and moving heavy rocks on the farm

The daily work of the boys would include removing stones, building stone walls, trenching the gardens and hauling coal from the train station in the village of Westborough. In 1855, a large reservoir was required for the waste disposal of the institution. Periodically this reservoir would be drained and the solids would be removed and made into liquid fertilizer to be spread on the hay field. Over the five years, the boys would be involved in creating gravel walkways, setting apple and pear trees as well as the daily chores in the operations of the gardens and livestock.

During this period, the Department of Agriculture paid for and built a, combination piggery, slaughterhouse and store house; a granary and sheds. The piggery gained negative attention in the farming community for its perceived extravagance expense.

Over the five-years the Board of Agriculture had management, the capacity of the farm was increased considerably. Produce, milk, pork and beef output were all increased with a recommendation of purchasing additional dairy cattle. It was found, however, that over this five-years the expenses of running the farm were greater than would be considered normal for a regular farm because of the use and instruction of child labor. In 1864 the farm was declared, by the Board of State Charities, to be too large to be profitable and always was a financial burden to the institution. (Note: Inventory of farm equipment in 1857)

=== Cemetery 1858 ===
In 1858, a cemetery at the Reform School was laid out and graded. A receiving tomb was constructed and a gravel walk was laid around the lot. This cemetery would be used from 1858 to 1884 to bury boys who died while in state custody and were not claimed by parents or relatives. Prior to burial, a service was held in the chapel with boys from the reform school present. After the service, the coffin would be loaded on a wagon and transported to the cemetery some distance from the main building. (Note: The coffins were bought by the State and line item-ed in the annual treasure's report.)

Total number of boys that died while under the care and custody of the state reform school from 1848 to 1884 was 79. (Note: 1 boy each died in 1881 and 1882)

There were 25 unnamed boys that died before the cemetery was created.

==== Boys that were interred in the cemetery between 1858 and 1884 ====
- Samuel Thomson died on June 10th 1858 of consumption
- James T. Washington, once a slave, died on December 4th 1874 of consumption
- George D. Ames died January 18th 1874 after a brief illness
- Thomas Gartland died January 15th 1876 from suicide

==== Named boys not listed as being interred in the cemetery, between 1848 and 1884 ====
- Abner T. Wells died October 19th 1874 of a hereditary disease
- James F. Rigby died April 15th 1875 of a hereditary disease
- Fred Miller died October 13th 1879 of anaemia
- Jeremia J. McConologue died March 7th 18th 1879 of necrosis
- Patrick Donovan died February 7th 1880 of diabetes melitus
- John Gethin died April 23rd 10 1881 of endocarditis
- Walter Shepard died September 15th 1884 of an exceedingly violent sickness.

There were 68 unnamed boys that died between 1848 and 1884.

6 coffins were bought between 1855 and 1884.

3 gravestones were bought in 1878. There is no indication that other grave markers were bought or made at the reform school

In 1831 the Massachusetts Anatomy Act was passed. Aimed to curb grave-robbing by making the bodies of those who died in almshouses (poorhouses), hospitals, and other state institutions and remained unclaimed by family or friends, available to medical schools and physicians for dissection.

In 1842, Harvard Medical School employed Ephraim Littlefield, a janitor who also supplied the school with cadavers for 25 dollars per body. It remains unclear whether Littlefield robbed the graves himself or was merely a middleman

Governor Benjamin Butler, in his inaugural address of January 4, 1883, accused the long-established State Board of Health, Lunacy and Charity of:

1. “The almshouse authorities sold as merchandise to the Medical School of Harvard College, the bodies of from one hundred and fifty to two hundred and fifty infants annually, at from $3 to $5 each; most of these infants having died at the State Almshouse”
2. “The bodies of large numbers of pauper adults, who died at the State Almshouse, were sold as merchandise for very considerable sums.”

The rebuttal from the State Board of Health, Lunacy and Charity of Massachusetts:

1. The Almshouse authorities never " sold as merchandise," so far as we can ascertain, a single infant corpse, either for $3 or $5 or any other price, to the Harvard Medical School or to any other. They did permit, under an ancient statute, the officers of medical schools to receive a few bodies of infants in each year for the promotion of anatomical science; but this number appears never to have exceeded ten in any year.
2. The bodies of pauper adults dying at the State Almshouse were never "sold as merchandise," so far as any investigation could determine. The number of such bodies delivered to medical authorities has not been at any time very large; nor has the sum received for their preparation and transportation been half so large as that ordinarily paid for such anatomical material by medical schools throughout the country, as we have reason to believe.

In the 1800s Massachusetts state institutions provided their unclaimed dead to Harvard Medical school and perhaps others for dissection. The exact number of persons that were under the care and custody of the Massachusetts state institutions and were provided, over the years, may never be known. There is no indication that the state reform school for boys provided any of the 75 boys that died and were not interred in the cemetery, to any medical schools or physicians.

The exact location of the cemetery was never recounted although there are some entries in the Annual Reports that give insight into its location. (Note: The annual reports recounts the work that was done on the cemetery over the years. The investigative report of 1877 recounts the cemetery as being 1/4 mile from the main building.)

=== Fire 1859 ===
On August 13, 1859, influenced by 5 other boys, Daniel Credan set fire to a wooden ventilating flue in the new addition of the school. The fire quickly spread through the ventilation system to the attic, where the dry wood and open space allowed the flames to quickly spread throughout the structure. The officers, boys and fire departments from neighboring towns worked to put out the fire, but not until three-quarters of the institution was destroyed, including the new addition minus the chapel, which was heavily damaged. At the time of the fire, there were approximately 572 boys housed there.

In the days after the fire, it was determined that what remaining portion of the school was only capable of housing 300 boys. As a temporary measure, 240 were sent to the new jail in Fitchburg and about 26 of the less trustworthy boys were sent to the Concord jail. While the legislature was deciding what the future of the reform school should be, it was necessary to make other arrangements for the housing of the boys. After much consideration by the board of trustees and in consolation with the Governor, a large building in the town of Westborough was leased and set it up to house 150 of the younger boys. (Note: The temporary housing of the younger boys in Westborough was referred to as the nursery.) Additionally the remaining building would be repaired to house the remaining boys.

In September 1859, then Governor Nathaniel P. Banks, address the Speaker of the House of Representatives on the destruction of the Westborough Reform School. The governor recommended that the remaining structure should be repaired to accommodate no more than 200 boys and that the family cottage system should be implemented. Additionally a Nautical Branch should be created for the older boys to instruct them in the duties of being seaman. The legislature formed a committee chaired by Martin Brimmer of Boston to take up the matter and on October 12, 1859, the committee's report was forwarded endorsing the governor's position (Note: Martin Brimmer was the son of the 9th Mayor of Boston Martin Brimmer)

In the months after the fire little changed in the day-to-day operations of the institution. The farm recently being transferred back to the board of trustees provided work for a good number of boys during the summer months. Two contracts were signed, one for chair seating and one for shoe making allowing for productive work to continue in the workshops. During this time the Sunday school services were held at the Town Hall in Westborough due to the extensive damage to the chapel. Most of the services were conducted by clergy and devoted women in the town of Westborough for the boys of the main building as well as the nursery.

== Reorganization to the cottage system 1860–72 ==
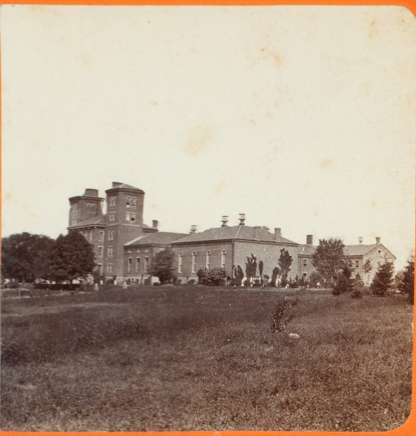
State Reform School as seen 1860–77

Superintendents:

- William E. Starr (1857–61)
- Joseph A. Allen (1861–67)
- Orville K. Hutchinson (1867–68)
- Benjamin Evans (1868–73)
- Allen G. Shepard (1874–78)

With the destruction of three-quarters of the building by fire in 1859, the legislature had the task of deciding what to do with the reform school. With the recommendations of the Governor and of a committee formed, the legislature in 1860 appropriated money to build 3 houses and make renovations to the remaining structure as deemed necessary for a new classification system. Additionally, some laws were added to address better governance of the institution as requested by the Trustees.

In the spring of 1860, the legislature approved $30,000 to renovate two existing farmhouses and build one new house, rebuild the chapel and to alter the old building to provide cautions against fire. On October 11, 1860, a dedication ceremony was held in the chapel with 333 boys in attendance. After a dedicatory prayer by the Reverend A.A. Arnold of Westborough, President Felton spoke.

The new system would have all boys, upon committal to the reform school, housed in the old building. Using a credit system for good behavior a boy could earn his way into one of the trust houses. In this way boys that were good candidates for reforming, in a family setting, were transferred to the trust houses and the older more harden boys were kept in the older building and separated according to class.

In that same year, the Legislature authorized the formation of the Nautical Branch of the reform school with the purchase of a school ship. It was thought that the older incorrigible juveniles, that were prone to violence, could be completely separated from the reform school but not be committed to the prison system. Additionally, it was thought that this class of boys would make good seamen for commercial and naval sailing vessels.

The Legislature also passed a law that year reducing the maximum commitment age from 16 to 14 years old. This was in keeping with the general thought that boys over the age of 14 were less likely to be reformed. They also abolishment of the alternative sentence. The alternative sentence was handed down by the judge at the time of sentencing and was designed to specify a sentence to prison if the boy was incorrigible at the reform school. In practice, however, it was found that in most cases the alternative sentence to prison was of a lesser duration than the reform school, sometimes amounting to only days. Because of this, some boys would act out at the reform school hoping for their alternative sentence to be enacted and for their sentence to be carried out in prison for a few days or weeks instead of the sentence to the reform school throughout their childhood.

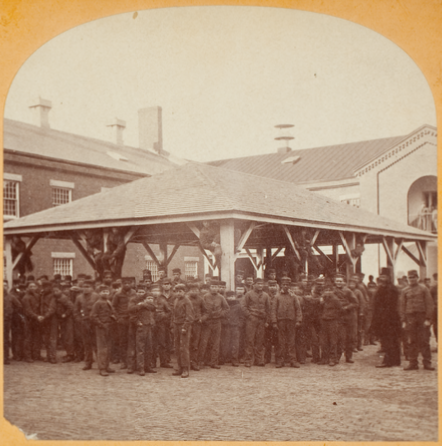
Group of boys in yard (1871)

Also enacted was an order that every sentence, to the reform school would be until the age of 18; previously it was 21. At the time, it was thought that the reform process should take upwards to 4 years to thoroughly educate the boys in character, schooling, industry, and labor. Additionally the power to commit inmates was restricted to judges of the Superior and probate courts, and all boys should have legal representation in court provided by the state. It was thought that by limiting the number of judges able to commit boys to the state reform school the number of boys committed for minor offenses would be reduced.

In 1864, the legislature created an agency which they named the Board of State Charities. Its purpose was to make recommendations regarding the management of all of the State prisons, Reform Schools and Almshouses in the State. It was also charged with coordinating transfers between institutions and also managing the indenture of youth in the system. In 1866 and Visiting Agency was incorporated into the Board of State Charities to follow up and visit the indentured. Prior to the establishment of the Visiting Agency, very little information was gathered and kept on those indentured. The children indentured from the State Reform School from 1848 to 1863 was 1283. (Note: Discharge statistics of the State Reform School for 1848–1863) Approximately half of that number, the master never wrote the board of trustees as to the well-being of their apprentice as required by their contract. It was hoped that the Visiting Agent could keep tabs on the indentured children and follow their progress.

=== Nautical branch ===
In 1856, the legislature explored the idea of having a reform school on board a sailing vessel as a means of training an older class of juvenile boys to be seamen. This idea was implemented in 1856 in Liverpool, England, with the naval vessel Akbar. This early idea would not gain much traction in the legislature until the fire of 1859 which destroyed three-quarters of the state reform school and created the conditions to revisit the idea. Once enacted a board of three commissioners was appointed to carry out the plan.

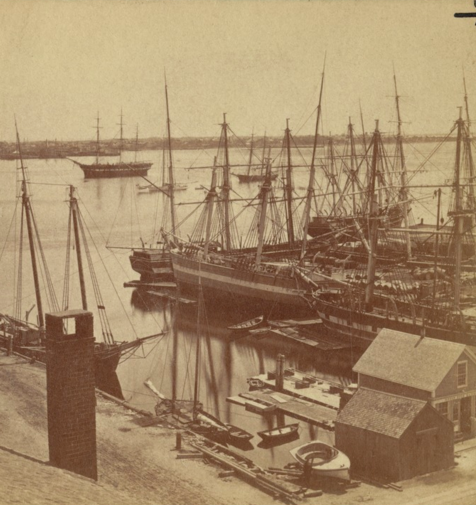
Reform school ship Massachusetts

In December 1859 they purchase the ship Rockall making alterations to use it as a reform school for 200 boys and christened it the Massachusetts. Soon after the commissioners purchased a schooner the Wave and on June 5, 1860, dedicated both as the nautical branch of the state reform school.

On July 26, 1860, 50 boys were transferred from the state reform school to the nautical branch. The first station for the Massachusetts was in Boston Harbor but it was soon changed to Salem by the governor in December 1860.

In 1861, the Massachusetts was fitted out with four guns and was used as a guard ship for merchant vessels in Boston Harbor. In 1862 the Wave was declared useless and was sold.

In 1865, it was found necessary to acquire another ship, the Massachusetts being found inadequate to accommodate all the boys available. The trustees were authorized to purchase a second ship larger in size than the Massachusetts. Once purchased this ship was named the George M. Barnard and was commissioned in February 1866. In that same year the Massachusetts was permanently moved to New Bedford where it would remain.

In 1867, the legislature severed ties between the nautical branch and the state reform school and the school ships became independent institutions and were titled the Massachusetts Nautical School.

Life for the boys aboard the ship involved learning navigation, general education, and working about the ship. The boys were divided into two watches; when one watch was in school the other watch would be doing the work that sailors must do.

Starting in 1862, judge Thomas Russell was accustomed to taking trips to the George M. Bernard in Boston Harbor on Sundays to address the boys. (Note: Additional information on Judge Thomas Russell) He would frequently invite gentlemen and ladies to accompany him. Among the distinguished guests were: Charles Dickens, Goldwin Smith, David Farragut, Oliver Howard, John Andrew, Joseph Hawley, William Claflin, Marshall Jewel, and Lucius Fairchild, Matthew Simpson Frederic Huntington, Edward Taylor and George Haskins, (Note: More on Father Haskins) Charles Sumner, Mrs. Julia Ward Howe and Anna Dickinson. Thomas Russell also served as host when on June 23, 1867 President Andrew Johnson made a visit to the school ship in Boston Harbor.

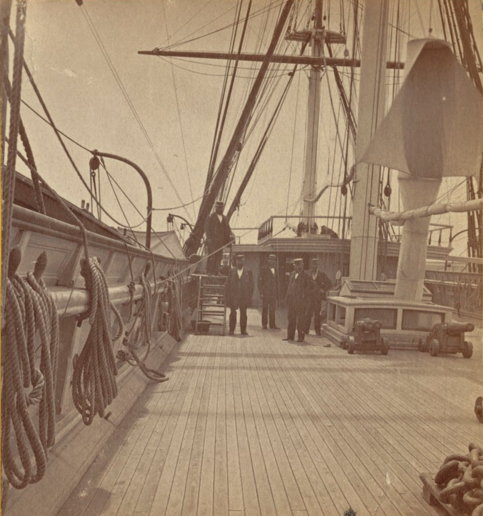
On board the school ship Massachusetts

In the 12 years the nautical branch was run, there were 2062 committed and 140 more transferred from the state reform school. The average age of the boys committed was 13.5 and the average time spent on the ship was between 10 and 18 months. Over this period, the average cost per student was twice the average cost per student at the state reform school. Besides their general educational studies and work on the ship, it was very difficult to find suitable work and there was little opportunity to do anything else. It was found that classification of the boys was impossible and, therefore, vicious and comparatively good boys were crowded together. The system as a whole wasn't suitable for the reformation of the boys.

The legislature in 1870 ordered the discontinuance of one school ship and in 1872 ordered that the nautical school be discontinued entirely.

The State of New York followed Massachusetts in 1869 with a similar experiment, with the purchase of the school ship Mercury. (Note: More on the school ship "Mercury")

=== Family cottages ===
The progressive thought of juvenile Reform, in England, in the 1830s was to place 1 to 3 dozen inmates with similar characteristics in separate small houses under the supervision of a surrogate father or mother. The "family" thus created was to work, live, and attend school together, mixing only rarely with the inmates placed in other families. This was a radical departure from "congregate system" that the State Reform School for boys was founded on.

The congregate system is a prison-like facility for housing delinquents in large dormitory areas, bringing them together under strict routines in classrooms, workshops, cafeterias and recreational areas. The main disadvantage of the congregate system is the older, more vicious boys are housed with the younger, more impressionable boys. This disadvantage is overcome with the cottage system. (Note: The cottage system is also known as the "family system". The individual buildings were usually referred to as cottages or houses. In Westborough the houses were referred to as "Trust Houses", with each house having its own name.)

In the late 1830s, the Colonie de Mettray in France was built on the cottage system.

In the United States, the cottage system was slow to catch on because of the greater expense of land, buildings, and services required, and the supposed increase difficulty of control of the inmates. Eventually, it was introduced with the opening of the Industrial School for Girls in Lancaster Massachusetts (1854) and the Ohio Reform School (1857) which was modeled after the Colonie de Mettray.

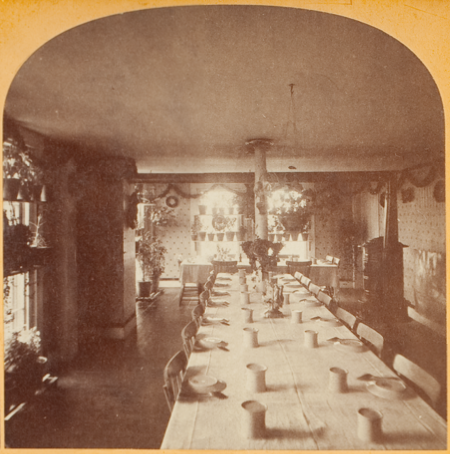
Dining room in "Peter House" (1871)

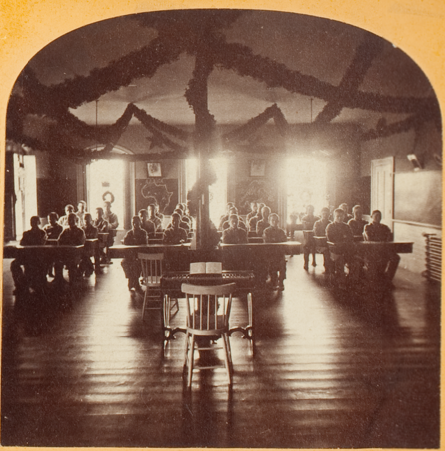
School room in "Garden House" (1871)

By an act of the legislature in 1860, three Trust Houses were to be constructed on the school grounds at Westborough. One would be named the "Farmhouse" the second the "Peter's House" and the third would be named the "Garden House". The farmhouse was an existing structure pre-dating the reform school. It would be renovated to house 30 boys, a master and matron. (Note: Each house is under the charge of a gentleman and his wife who have control and management of the boys, subject to the general rules of the institution, and subordinate to the superintendent.) The Peter's house was also an existing structure pre-dating the reform school. It was the home of the original owner of the property. It to was renovated to house 30 boys, a master and a matron. The garden house was a new building built on the ruins of the reform school section destroyed by fire. This was a brick structure intended to house 30 boys with a master and matron.

The daily lives of the boys in the trust houses was intended to be like a large family. The boys, along with the master and matron, would set at the same table to eat their daily meals, which were prepared by the boys under the supervision of the matron. The chores of the house would all be done by the boys. The boys would be schooled by the master in one room of the house. Being employed mostly on the farm they could run away at any time if they so chose, but few of them did. Discipline was more parental in nature there being no physical restraints or confinement.

After the first year of the trial, the trustees were so convinced of the benefits of the cottage system that they recommended to the legislature that two more homes be built and the number of boys housed in each be reduced to 20.

The trust houses would remain as the central focus of reforming the younger boys throughout the remaining years of the institution. When the Reform School for Boys closed in 1884 the newly formed Lyman School for Boys was recreated under the cottage system.

== Final years 1873–84 ==
Superintendent:

- Allen G. Shepard (1873–78)
- Luther H. Sheldon (1879–80)
- Edmond T. Dooley (1880–81)
- Joseph A. Allen (1881–85)

Change was a constant theme throughout the years, and it was no different in the final years. Discipline, rewards, work, classification of the boys and overall management of the institution continued to change trying to adapt to the times, philosophies of the changing superintendents and legislative laws.

As a result, of the abolishment of the Nautical Branch, it was necessary to find a place to house not only those older boys that had been previously on the school ships but also future commitments of boys of that class. Despite the recommendations of the board of trustees and the superintendent, in 1870, the legislature once again changed the minimum age of commitment at the reform school from 14 to 17 allowing for the older class of boys to be committed there. Also that year, the legislature pass provisions allowing the visiting agent to work with the courts to identify suitable boys to indenture directly from the courts without being committed to the reform school first. This would lessen the amount of younger boys committed to the reform school while making additional room for the older incorrigible boys. As a consequence of these two legislative acts there were not enough young qualified boys committed, to fill the trust houses and the quantity of older incorrigible boys increased.

Work for the older boys changed as well. They could not be trusted to work on the farm, without escaping, so their only means of labor was in the workshop seating chairs. The trustees thought these boys should be taught some industrial trades, but the legislature failed to appropriate money to build additional workshops, buy the machinery and hire overseers necessary to implement it. What occurred, because of these changes, was a total change in the character of the institution. It went from a place of reformation for young offenders to a place for housing older incorrigible offenders with a building and officers who were ill-equipped to deal with it. With the abolishment of the nautical branch, the trustees and superintendent sought relief from the legislature, asking that the older boys be sent elsewhere or money appropriated to build an addition to house and segregate the incorrigible ones. The legislature responded with small Appropriations enough to make minor Improvement in the security of the existing building.

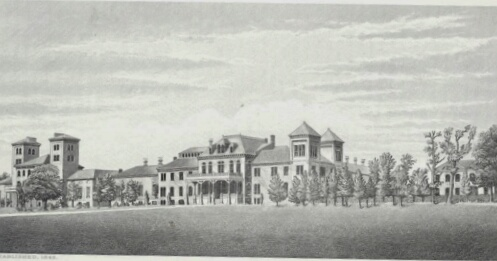
State Reform School 1877–84

=== Building Enlargement 1877 ===
In 1875 the legislature passed an appropriation of $90,000 for an addition to the school as a Correctional Department. The addition was built mainly upon the foundations of the part burned in 1859, though the arrangement of the rooms differs greatly.

Plans and estimates were presented by Messrs. Cutting and Holman of Worcester; and these plans, after careful study by the Trustees, were submitted to a committee of the council, and, meeting with their approval, the work was started in August of 1875.

The work was done by divided contract, proposals requested for the different parts, the brick-work, the lumber, the stone and the iron. A large number of the inmates were selected for this outside work. Some for excavating the foundations, some for assisting the masons, others to help in the moving of the Garden House built some 17 years earlier. The removal of the Garden House was necessary because it stood upon ground to be occupied by the enlargement, and could not readily be made a part of it.

When completed, the addition would have two large schoolrooms, sleeping halls and a dining room for about 200 boys. It would also have workshops, cells for solitary confinement, a hospital and room for the officers. Once the new addition was completed and occupied in April 1877 a series of mechanical trades were introduced including sleigh making, blacksmithing, painting, and woodworking, including making handcarts, wheelbarrows and hand sleds. With this new addition, the older incorrigible boys were able to be completely segregated from the other boys. They had separate school-rooms, separate dining-rooms, sleeping rooms, and workshops, and their playground was separated from the reformatory department boys by a building two stories high and thirty-eight feet wide. They will only see the reformatory department boys on the Sabbath in the chapel, when the reformatory department boys occupy the gallery, the correctional department boys the floor.

With this new addition the trustees created the reformatory branch (old building), correctional branch (new addition), trust branch (3 trust houses) and hospital branch (both hospitals).

In 1879 the trustees thought it wise to renamed the correctional department to the Industrial department. The term "Industrial department" would be used throughout the state institutions.

=== Riot and judicial inquiry 1877 ===
On January 12, 1877 in the reformatory department, after eating supper and while still in the dining room, one of the inmates threw a bowl at a teacher and hit him in the head, creating an ugly cut that bled profusely. Other boys joined in and before it was over, 97 bowls were thrown at officers. The boys all rushed into the yard, where they were soon collected, and the officers took them to the schoolrooms. The boys who had plotted the riot grabbed ice skates and attacked the officers in schoolrooms. At the same time, other boys turned off the gas lights, and in the darkness the officers escaped out the door. The boys then barricaded the doors and proceeded to use settees as battering rams on the barred windows. They destroyed all the desks and other furniture in the classrooms and were able to gain access to the roof. The superintendent summoned Edwin B. Harvey, a trustee from Westborough, and informed him of the riot and asked that he immediately ride over. The superintendent and the officers gathered a fire hose and sprayed water through any windows that the boys were throwing furniture out of. They also subdued the boys that had made their way to the roof in hopes of escape by spraying water on them as well. When Mr. Harvey arrived at the institution the riot was still in progress and the superintendent asked him to go to the Village of Westborough and gather men to help put down the uprising. After an hour, the trustee came back with 12 able men and they organized and dragged two fire hoses up the stairs and gained access to the schoolrooms. Once in the schoolroom they were able to subdue all the boys by spraying them with water.

It was determined over the course of several days that 15 inmates were the main leaders of the riot. The following week these 15 inmates were transferred to Superior Court in Worcester to stand trial. Thirteen of these boys were convicted and sentenced to various terms in the House of Correction.

Soon after the riot, several articles appeared in area newspapers detailing the riot and alleged abuses against the boys at the reform school. In March of that year, a committee was formed in the legislature to look into allegations of mismanagement and abusive at the reform school. The committee called as witnesses trustees, superintendents, and inmates of the institution. The committee focused on the allegations of abuse through the use of various forms of corporal punishment.

Whipping upon the bare back of the boys by the officers with leather straps made in the shoe shop was a frequently used measure. Boys were held in the basement of the chapel in cells, where they were kept for days or even weeks with only rations of bread and water to eat and a cot to sleep on. There were two other forms of restraint that were called the straitjacket and the sweatbox. The straitjacket was made of leather with an attached gag to be put in the boy's mouth and the boy would be laid down until it was time to go to bed. If he did not submit, the treatment would be continued the next day. The sweatbox was a wooden box made in the woodworking shop that stood about six and a half feet tall and was just wide enough for a person to stand upright without being able to move. They would put an inmate in the box, standing up with their arms by their side with slits in the box in front of their faces to allow air to enter for breathing. They would stand in there unable to move until the end of the day. Spraying cold water from the fire hose on a boy was used as a way subdue him and hopefully modify his behavior.

The results of the investigation by this committee were submitted to the legislature in a 900-page report on May 7. Based on this report, the legislature authorized the governor to appoint a new board of trustees, and they enacted laws regulating the use of corporal punishment in the reform school.

=== Workhouse at Bridgewater 1883-1885 ===
At 8 o'clock, Saturday night, July 7, 1883 the superintendent of the reform school was notified by a telegram that the Bridgewater Workhouse was burned down, and you must meet seventy-five of their inmates at the reform school train station and provide for them. At 9.30 they were in the state reform school chapel, the officers who brought them leaving immediately. Leaving Bridgewater on Saturday, after the fire, the men were in bad condition, some without hats or shoes, and many in their shirtsleeves. Full suits of clothes were provided for them on Monday, and before the end of the week they were comfortably situated and at work in a chair-shop fitted up for them. The superintendent had supervision of these men for week days. It was two weeks before the Bridgewater superintendent, his assistant and officers came to the reform school and assumed responsibility. The new wing of the Reform School building proved to be a very convenient temporary location for the State Workhouse. This arrangement would continue until the spring of 1885 when the prisoners where sent back to Bridgewater . The behavior of the men was excellent. A twelve feet high fence was erected across their yard, which effectively separated the two institutions.

For a few weeks, the boys in the reformatory department were very excited by the presence of the men, and caused the school a considerable amount of trouble, mostly because they could see their new neighbors chewing tobacco and smoking. The conduct of the Bridgewater boys was as good as you might expected of such a class.

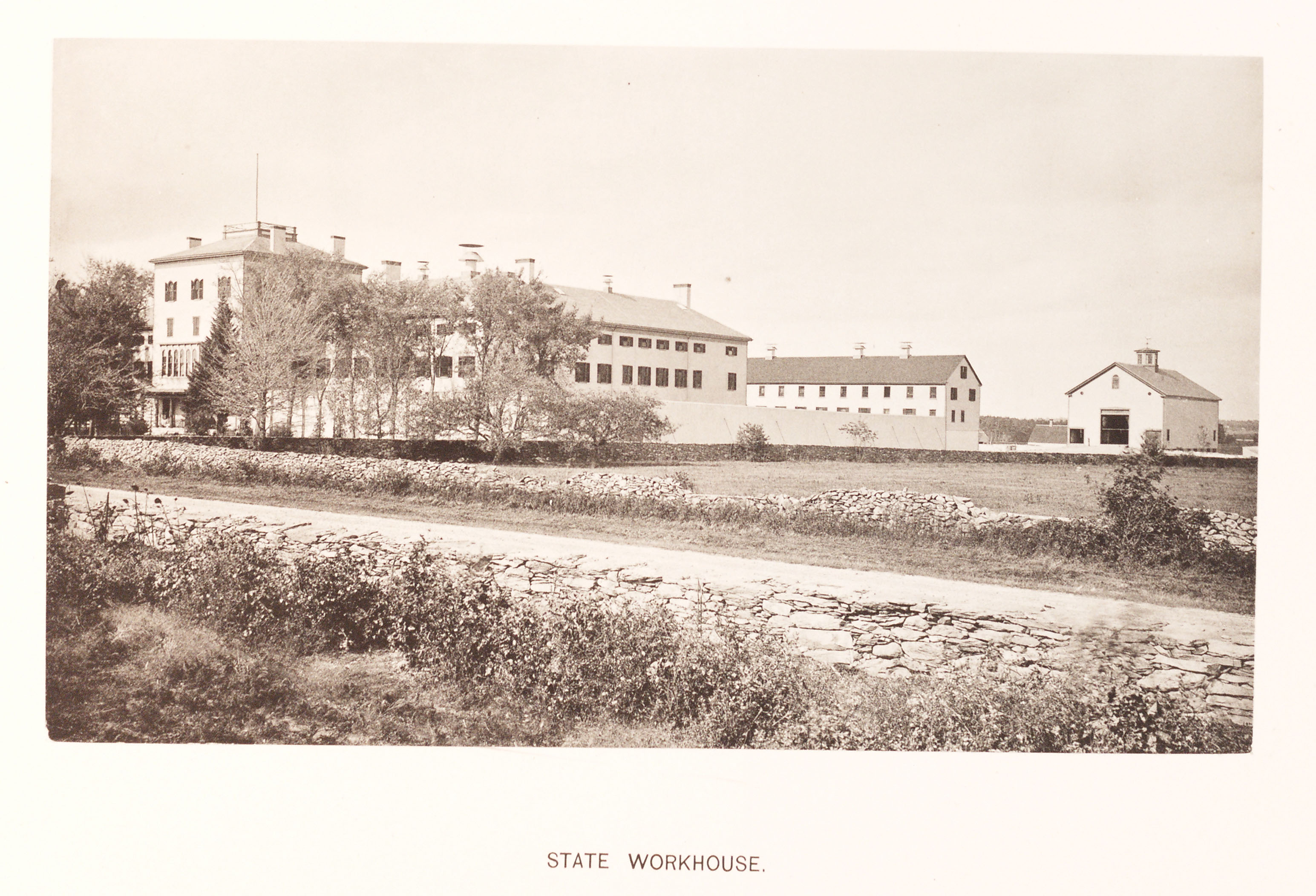
State Workhouse at Bridgewater 1871

Originally the buildings at Bridgewater were occupied as a State Almshouse from (1854-1872 ); but the need of classifying the State poor led to the establishment of a State Workhouse in 1866-1887. These institutions became dumping grounds for a very diverse group, including the elderly poor, the mentally ill, people with disabilities (both mental and physical), children, and those suffering from chronic illnesses. This catch-all approach made specialized care impossible and often led to the exploitation or further decline of vulnerable individuals. These issues were gradually but not altogether eliminated by transferring many residents to specialized state institutions that could better care for their needs, a process that had begun in the middle of the 19th century.

=== Disposition of the State Reform School Buildings and Boys ===
Proposed Conversion of State Reform School into a Criminal Insane Asylum (1882)

In accordance with the Resolve, chapter 33 of 1881, the Board last presented plans for a separation of the criminal insane of Massachusetts from the other patients in our hospitals and asylums; among which were the following:

Occupation of the Westborough Buildings. This complete separation from other establishments is difficult to maintain in Massachusetts on account of the small number of our criminal insane. The nearest approach to it, which the year 1882 seemed likely to put in the power of the State, was to take the main buildings of the State Reform School at Westborough and adapt the eastern part, which was built for prison purposes, to the uses of a criminal asylum. This can still be done at a smaller expense than the building of a structure large enough for even a hundred such patients would require. The plan would be to tear out the present block of cells in this part of the Westborough buildings and construct single dormitories on the side next the yard, leaving the east side open for a ward or corridor. The other three sides of the eastern yard can be treated in the same manner, and such other portions of the buildings as may be necessary can be taken for dormitories, day-rooms, workshops, and the other uses of such an asylum. The space is ample, and we last year procured estimates of the capacity and cost of such alterations, amounting to about $30,000 for the internal changes, which would provide room for 100 patients in single and double dormitories, with proper rooms for attendants, officers, etc. These wards and dormitories could be occupied by any class of the insane; but, if the dangerous and criminal insane should be placed there, it would further be needful to build external walls, enclosing areas for gardens, etc. There is now an enclosure outside the Westborough buildings which could be used and extended as might be found necessary in order to give the patients of the proposed asylum space for doing garden work, while the extensive farm would furnish employment for such other patients as would not need the restraint of an enclosure. Such portions of the main building as would not be needed for the asylum patients could be occupied, at least temporarily, by epileptic patients of the more troublesome kind, transferred from the present State hospitals, where they now interfere very seriously with the treatment of the ordinary insane. In this way perhaps 250 patients could be accommodated at a construction cost of $75,000.

Proposed relocation of the State Reform School to Lancaster (1884)

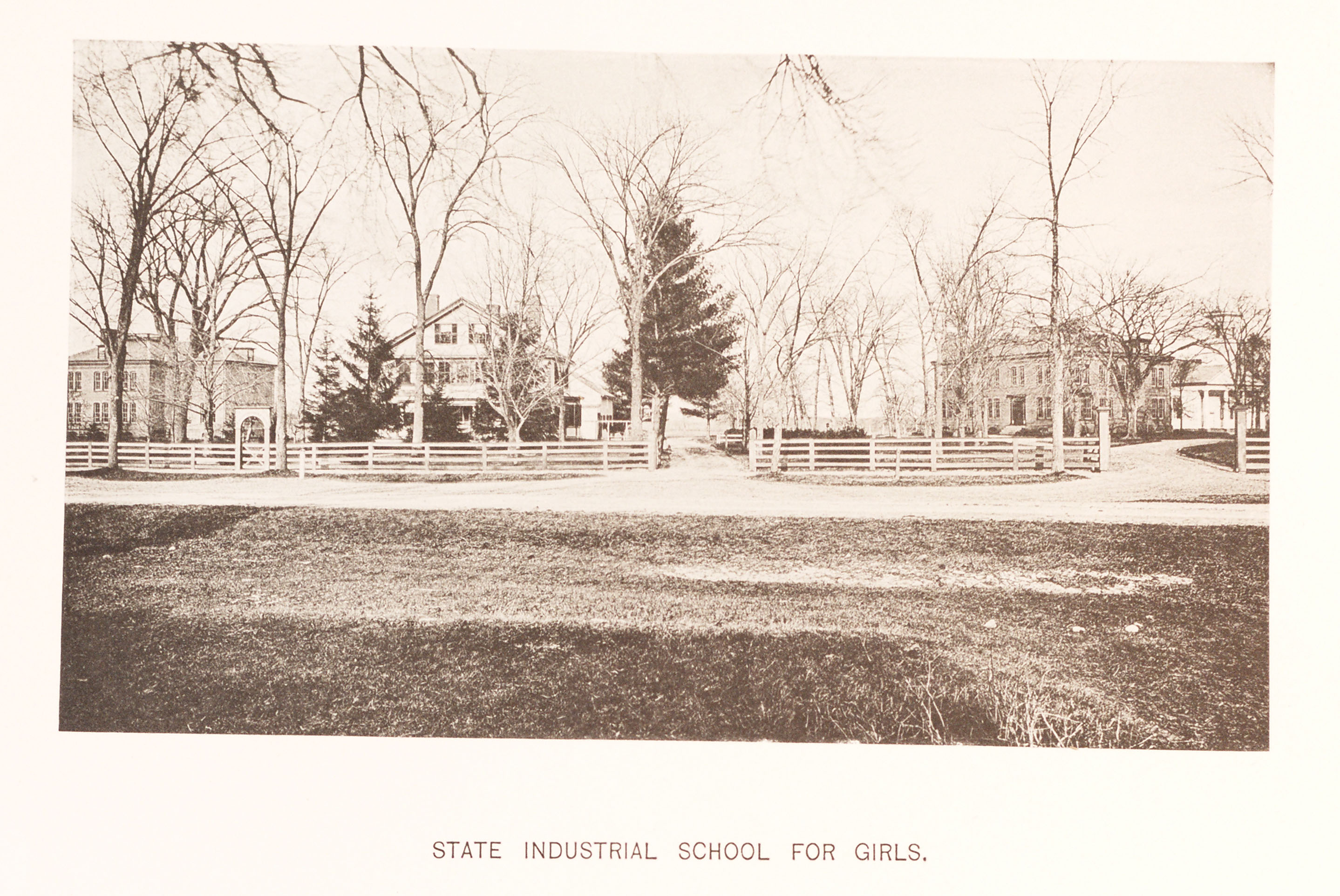
Industrial School for Girls at Lancaster 1871

A popular suggestion was to relocate the younger boys from the reform school in Westborough, to the State-owned farm and buildings of the Industrial School for Girls in Lancaster built in 1859 which does not fill the buildings. By transferring the girls in Lancaster to Monson or elsewhere, the Lancaster buildings could at once be occupied by the younger boys now at Westborough, who could be employed, as soon as spring opens, in cultivating the farm there. The number of such boys would be less than one hundred, and they could be lodged in the four family houses now standing at Lancaster. For one family of these boys the present workshop at Lancaster could be used; and two other detached workshops in convenient localities could be fitted up, in buildings now standing, for a small sum. The Lancaster buildings already contain school-rooms, dining rooms, a chapel, etc., large enough for the boys who should be sent there. If it should be found necessary hereafter to extend the Lancaster buildings so as to receive more than one hundred boys of the age suitable for a reform school, there is enough land for any reasonable extension, and for the farm and garden work of the pupils, even should their number reach two hundred. The plan aimed to reduce expenses, optimize existing state properties, and improve the segregation of younger and older inmates within the state's reformatory system.

Proposed Relocation of State Reform School (1885)

The governor and trustees thought it would be economical to rebuild on remaining land, or to purchase other land adjoining the state reform school.

Proposed Conversion of State Reform School into a Homeopathic insane hospital (1883)

The movement for a state homoeopathic hospital for the insane originated within the homoeopathic medical societies. Dr. Samuel Worcester of Salem, who had served as an assistant physician at Butler Hospital in Providence from 1867 to 1869, is credited with being the first to publicly propose the acquisition of such a state institution during a meeting. While the entire homoeopathic profession supported this endeavor, the leading figure in this, as in many other successful homoeopathic initiatives, was Dr. I. Tisdale Talbot of Boston. Initial efforts by Dr. Talbot and his associates to secure legislative approval for a new location and construct new buildings proved unsuccessful. However, a potential opportunity arose from an unexpected quarter. Attention soon turned to the State Reform School at Westborough leading to discussions about its potential conversion or transfer.

In his 1883 report to the State Board of Health, Lunacy and Charity, Mr. F. B. Sanborn, then Inspector of Charities, made a crucial recommendation: "The State should make provision at Westborough or elsewhere for the reception and treatment of at least 300 of the chronic insane who now crowd our hospitals."

Dr. Talbot and his colleagues in the State Society immediately recognized the strategic value of Sanborn's recommendation and its influential source. They swiftly petitioned the Massachusetts Legislature (General Court) for a grant of the Westborough property for their use. Crucially, they agreed to accept the "old and unsuitable institution" and committed to the formidable task of transforming its buildings from a "prison into a hospital."

Mr. Sanborn continued to advocate for the use of the Westborough facility as an asylum, particularly for the chronic insane. The homoeopathic community, however, opposed the limitation of patients solely to those deemed incurable. They sought equality with other state institutions and petitioned for a comprehensive hospital where patients from any part of the state, suffering from any form of mental disorder, could receive their preferred medical treatment.

=== Lyman School for Boys 1884 ===
On June 3, 1884, through Chapter 322 of the Acts, the Massachusetts Legislature formally established a state hospital for the care and treatment of the insane in Westborough. This new institution was unique in its mandate to operate upon the principles of homeopathic medicine. The Act specifically directed that the existing buildings of the State Reform School, which had occupied the site for decades, should be remodeled and repurposed to accommodate 325 patients for the new hospital.

The Board of Trustees for this new hospital was appointed during the summer of 1884, holding their inaugural meeting on August 5th. However, it was not until September 9th that all members were officially appointed and confirmed, allowing them to fully commence their duties.

Amidst the plans for the new hospital, a significant change occurred for the reform school itself. On September 31, 1884, the State Reform School was officially renamed the Lyman School for Boys. This renaming was a symbolic shift, perhaps anticipating its eventual relocation and a renewed focus on its mission.

As the new hospital's trustees moved forward with their mandate, pressure mounted for the Lyman School to vacate its premises. Conferences and communications between the Hospital Trustees and the School Trustees took place on February 3rd, 10th, and 24th, and March 3rd, 1885. The Hospital Trustees emphasized the critical need for complete possession of the main building at Westborough before the first of April 1885 to properly fulfill their duties to the Commonwealth.

This urgency spurred the School Trustees into action to find suitable alternative accommodations for the boys. On March 20, 1885, the School Trustees were authorized to "lease and prepare the land and buildings known as Willow Park" to house boys who could no longer be accommodated in the Westborough buildings. Soon after, on April 9, 1885, the Trustees were authorized to purchase the Bela J. Stone farm. This acquisition was intended to provide more permanent housing solutions, with a larger building planned for 30 to 40 boys (and the Superintendent's residence), and a smaller building for another family of 30 boys. These new structures were anticipated to be completed around April 1, 1886

The main building of the Lyman School was formally vacated in April 1885. This marked a significant milestone in the transfer of the property to the new hospital. Evidence of this swift transition includes the sale of school desks, which had been appraised at $5.00 each in September 1881, for a mere 25 cents each at a public auction in April 1885, with several dealers present.

With the main building cleared, reconstruction efforts for the new Westborough State Hospital commenced on May 18, 1885. Despite the main building being vacated, some boys remained on the Westborough grounds. By September 30, 1885, there were 94 boys still in trust houses. The Lyman School fully vacated the boiler house in October 1885. The farm land was officially turned over to the Trustees of the hospital in November 1885. The "Peter's trust house," along with Mr. and Mrs. Howard, relocated to the Willow House in November 1885, further consolidating the Lyman School's move.

=== Reconstruction 1885-1886 ===
Throughout the 1870s, a number of organizations were established to benefit the boys with good conduct. One of these was the "Tried and True" class. In order to be a member, a boy would have to be voted in, based upon his overall good conduct over a period of time. The members would wear nickel-plated badges with the words tried-and-true and had privileges such as visiting neighboring villages unattended. During this time, the "Band of Hope" was formed complete with uniforms and instruments in which the boys would play at the school and in parades in the area villages. Two Baseball clubs were organized and uniforms were provided. One of the teams called the "Lyman", visiting several places in the state and playing with other clubs. A "Fire Company" was formed and uniforms were given to the boys who were admitted. The fire company would respond to alarms of fires outside of the institution's grounds. The fire company along with their horse-drawn, hand pumper, fire engine built by Hunneman Co of Boston would test their engine with the fire department in Westborough. (Note: Information of the Hunneman hand drawn pumper. Video of the operation of a hand pumper.) A military company called "Lyman Cadets" was formed, composed of 60 boys completely furnished with uniforms, Springfield Rifles, a full set of accouterments and drilled in accordance with the Upton's tactics. They would march in local parades and were seen at local fairs throughout the state.

In the late 1870s and early 1880s, accusations of abusive and mismanagement were constantly being reported in the newspapers fueled by former disgruntled officer and inmates. Two formal investigations were conducted and the finding documented. These accusations highlighted the underlining problem of housing incorrigible boys at Westborough.

By 1880, there was a decrease in commitments by the courts, and an effort was made by the board of trustees for the boys' prompt release once they reach the Honor System. This began to decrease the number of boys house at the institution, and as a result sections of the institution were closed. The salaries of those employed were reduced and duties were consolidated in order to reduce the number of staff employed. By 1882, all boys and officers were removed from the new addition, built 5 years prior, and placed in the old building. In 1883, various committees visited the Institution to determine the best way to move forward with the reform school and to use the unoccupied buildings. By a vote of the legislature in April 1884, the school was relocated to a temporary location in Westborough while a new campus could be built, and on September 30, 1884, the State Reform School for Boys was renamed the Lyman School school for boys.

Some notable improvements during this period included a new coal shed located at the "State Farm Station" 100 feet long and 24 feet wide, allowing for the storage of coal from the railroad. (Note: State Farm Station was located approximately 3/4 mile north from the institution along the Agricultural Branch Railroad in Northborough and opened in 1855. It would later be renamed the Hospital Station and later still the Talbot Station. The State Farm Station is labeled on this map as the depot.) This allowed coal to be stored and hauled 3/4 mile in Northborough rather than being 2.5 miles from Westborough.

In 1878, the first telegraph wire was erected from the institution to the office of Samual M Griggs near the railroad depot in the center of Westborough. (Note: Information on Samual M Griggs can be found in The History of Westborough Massachusetts)

== Bird's eye view of the institution ==
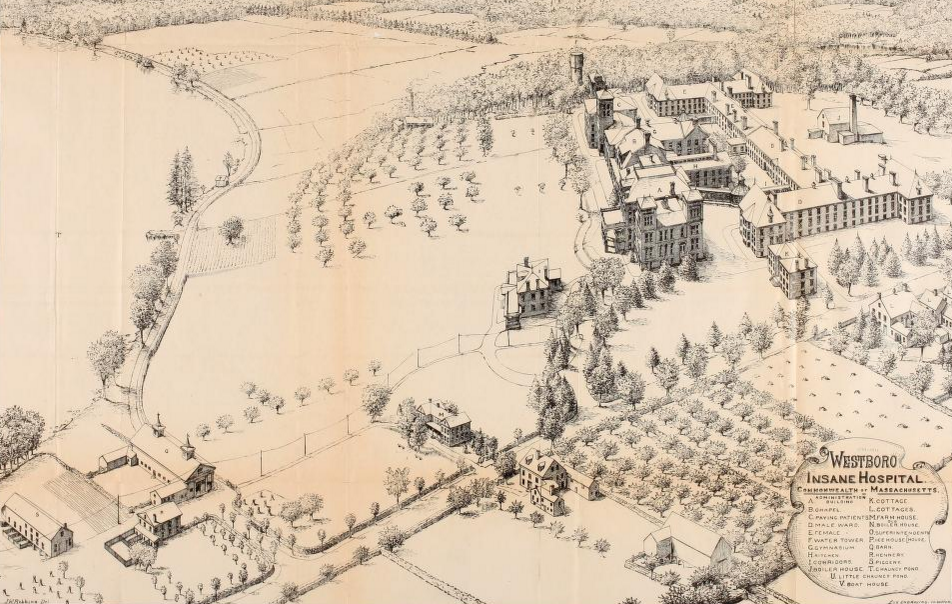

This is a bird's eye view artist rendering of the Insane Hospital in 1885. Most of the buildings depicted are as they were while the Reform School for Boys was there. This picture has annotations. Click the image to go to the annotated page.

== General references ==
1. 1st to 12th Annual Reports of the Trustees of the State Reform School (1847–1858)
2. 13th to 19th Annual Reports of the Trustees of the State Reform School (1859–1865)
3. 20th to 37th Annual Reports of the Trustees of the State Reform School (1868–1878)
4. 1st to 8th Annual Report of the Trustees of the State Primary and Reform Schools. (1879–86)
5. Annual Reports of the Board of State Charities (Volumes 1864–1877)
6. Annual Report of the Secretary of the Board of Agriculture vol 2 (1854)
7. Annual Report of the Secretary of the Board of Agriculture vol 4 (1856)
8. Annual report of the Secretary of the Board of Agriculture vol 5 (1857)
9. Annual Report of the Secretary of the Board of Agriculture vol 6 (1858)
10. Annual Report of the Secretary of the Board of Agriculture vol 54 (1906)
11. Investigation into the management and discipline of the State Reform School (1877)
12. Suggestions in Regard to the Proposed Removal of the State Reform School (1882)
13. Administration and Educational Work of American Juvenile Reform Schools
14. Society for the Improvement of Prison Discipline and for the Reformation of Juvenile Offenders
15. Society for the Prevention of Pauperism in the City of New York.
16. Our City Charities – The New-York House of Refuge for Juvenile Delinquents. The New York Times, January 23, 1860, page 2
