= Stubborn Children Law =

The General Court of Massachusetts Bay Colony recorded a law in November 1646 providing, among other things, for the capital punishment of male children that were disobedient to their parents.

The Massachusetts law stated:

If a man have a stubborn or rebellious son, of sufficient years and understanding sixteen years of age, which will not obey the voice of his Father, or the voice of his Mother, and that when they have chastened him will not harken unto them: then shall his Father and Mother being his natural parents, lay hold on him, and bring him to the Magistrates assembled in Court and testify unto them, that their son is stubborn and rebellious and will not obey their voice and chastisement, but lives in sundry notorious crimes, such a son shall be put to death. Deut. 21. 20. 21.

The law referenced a similar law contained in Book of Deuteronomy. This was part of the effort of the Massachusetts Puritans to rewrite the capital code of English common law to match more closely the Mosaic law of the Old Testament scriptures.

== History ==
Only one man was ever prosecuted under this law during the colony's history. In 1665 John Porter Jr was charged with being a stubborn and rebellious son after abusing his parents and their servants, attempting to stab one of his brothers, using threatening and reviling language against them and one of the colony's magistrates, and generally being "vile, prophane, & common swearer & drunkard". He had been brought before the courts before to deal with this behavior, yet it still continued. His father testified against him, but when his mother refused to join him, he was spared death by hanging. He was sentenced to stand upon the gallows with the rope around his neck for one hour, and then be "severely whipt" and "committed to the house of correction" as long as the government saw fit, and to pay a fine of £200. Porter did not serve his full sentence, as he escaped from prison and appealed to representatives of the king. Despite the complaints of the Massachusetts government, Porter was not returned to them, as the law under which he was punished was unknown in England.

This law was repealed by the General Court in 1681.
