= Hollywood Storage Company Building =

Historic building in Hollywood, California

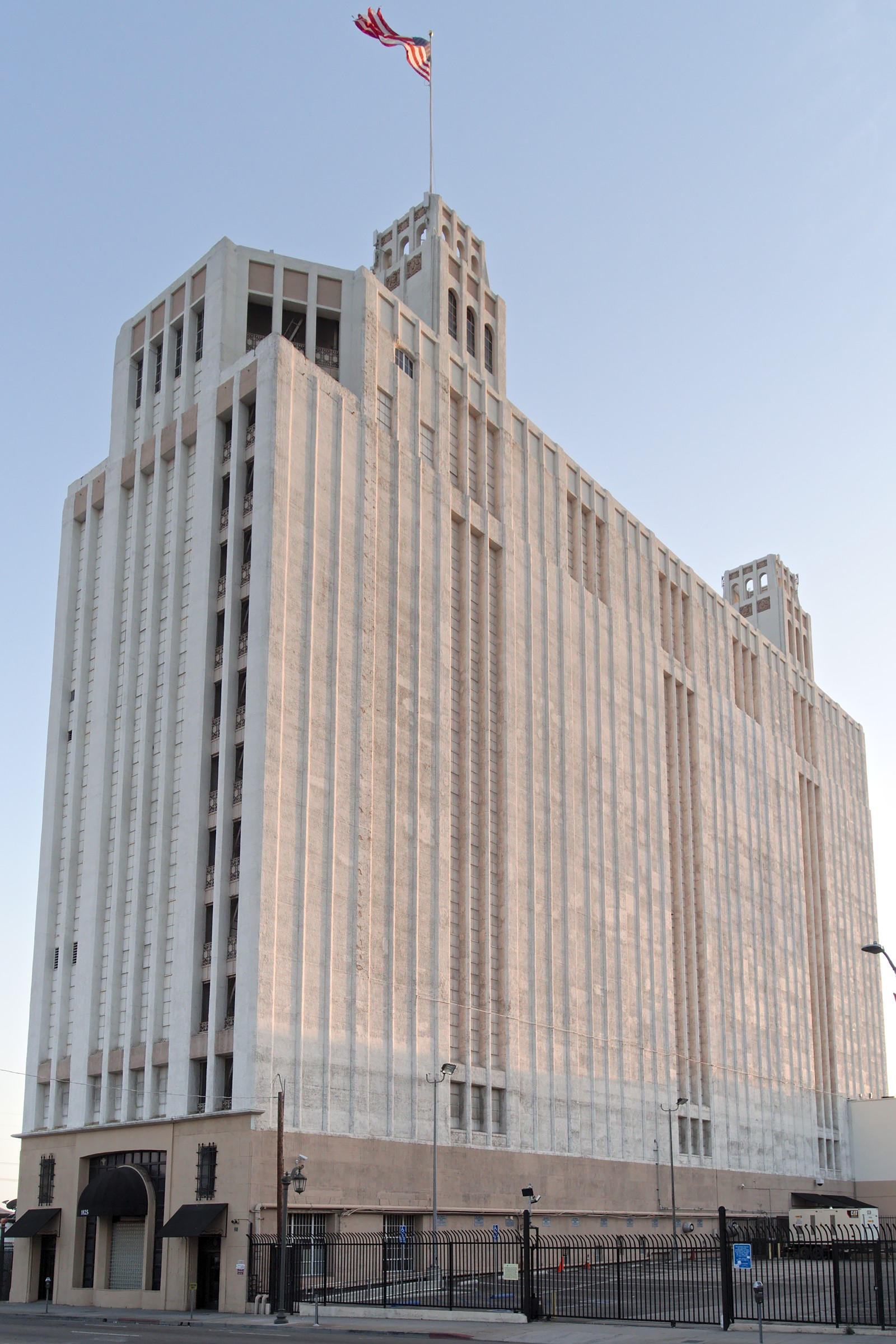
- The building in 2015
- Interactive map of the Hollywood Storage Company Building area

General information
- Location: 1025 Highland Avenue, Hollywood, California
- Coordinates: 34.0900°N 118.3395°W
- Named for: Hollywood Storage Company
- Year built: 1925
- Opened: June 1926

Design and construction
- Architect: Morgan, Walls & Clements

Hollywood Storage Company Building, also known as Toberman Storage Company Building and Bekins Moving and Storage Company Warehouse, is a historic fourteen-story building located at 1025 Highland Avenue in Hollywood, California.

== History ==
Hollywood Storage Company Building, built for developer Charles Toberman in 1925, was designed by Morgan, Walls & Clements, the architectural firm responsible for many Los Angeles landmarks, including the Dominguez–Wilshire Building, Adamson House, Chapman Plaza, and the El Capitan, Music Box, Wiltern, Mayan, and Belasco theaters. The building, which cost $750,000 ($13.8 million in 2025) to construct, opened in June 1926 and at fourteen stories in height was the tallest building in Hollywood.

The building was originally named Terminal Building, but this was changed to Hollywood Storage Building two weeks after opening. Originally built as a storage facility for the film industry, the building has been in continuous operation since its opening.

Evening Herald radio station KMTR moved into the building's top floor less than two months after the building's opening. The radio station also installed radio towers atop the building.

Eddie Brandstatter took over the building's rooftop ballroom for his 1928 New Year's Eve party. In 1930, the ballroom was used for several Republican fundraisers.

On December 7, 1930, the Los Angeles Times reported that 150 police officers broke up a nearly 400-person stag party on the building's top floor. 366 individuals were arrested on morals charges, all but four of which were men. Cost of admission to the party was one dollar ($19.27 in 2025).

The building was bought by Bekins, a moving company and pioneer in containerized storage, in 1939.

The building was evaluated for historic preservation in 2015, and was deemed eligible for inclusion in national, state, and local registers.

== Architecture and design ==
The city of Los Angeles considers Hollywood Storage Company Building an "excellent example of Art Deco industrial architecture" that contains essential, character-defining features of the style. Other sources, however, cite the building as having a Spanish Colonial Revival design.

The building is built of concrete.
