= Julian Medical Building =

Building in Los Angeles, California, U.S.

- U.S. Historic district – Contributing property
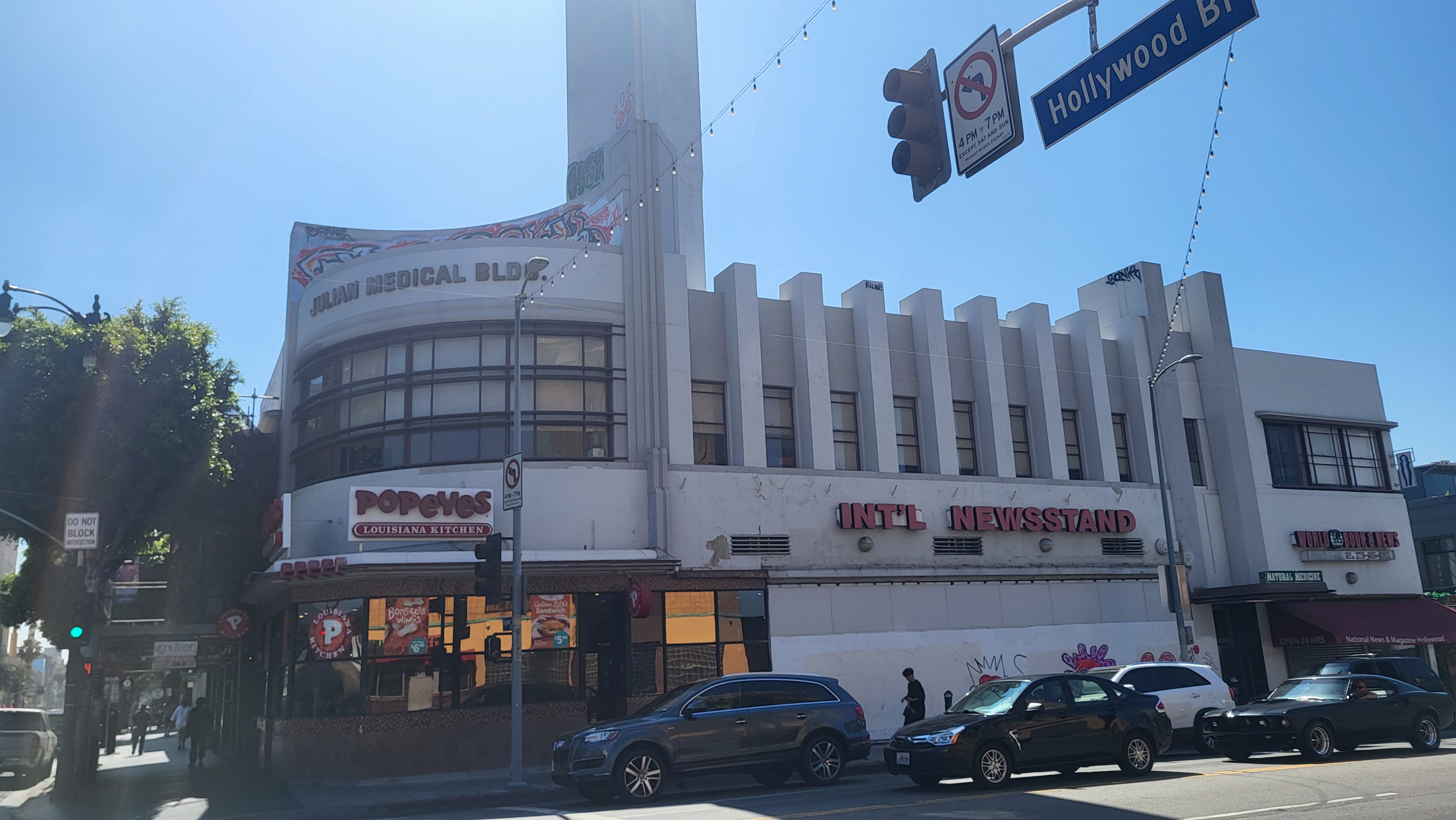
- The building in 2024

- Location within the Los Angeles metropolitan area
- Location: 6384 W. Hollywood Blvd., Hollywood, California
- Coordinates: 34.1014°N 118.3292°W
- Built: 1934
- Architect: Morgan, Walls & Clements
- Architectural style: Streamline Moderne
- Part of: Hollywood Boulevard Commercial and Entertainment District (ID85000704)
- Designated CP: April 4, 1985

Julian Medical Building, also known as Owl Drug Store Building, is a historic two-story building at 6384 W. Hollywood Boulevard, on the corner of Hollywood and Cahuenga Boulevard, in Hollywood, California.

== History ==
Julian Medical Building was built on the site of Hollywood's former civic center, which was redeveloped in 1933. The building was financed by the Beveridge family and designed by Morgan, Walls & Clements, the architectural firm responsible for many Los Angeles landmarks, including the Dominguez–Wilshire Building, Adamson House, Chapman Plaza, and the El Capitan, Music Box, Wiltern, Mayan, and Belasco theaters. This building, which features a combination of Art Deco and Streamline Moderne styles, was built in 1934.

Upon opening, the ground floor tenant was Owl Drug, giving the building the alternate name Owl Drug Store Building. The second floor contained medical offices.

In 1985, the Hollywood Boulevard Commercial and Entertainment District was added to the National Register of Historic Places, with Julian Medical Building listed as a contributing property in the district.

== Architecture ==
Julian Medical Building has been described as a "landmark", "an architectural masterpiece", and "one of the crowning achievements of Streamline Moderne." The building's distinctive features include a rounded Moderne corner, windswept tower, and pylon-separated horizontally-reinforced windows.

== In popular culture ==
Cahuenga Building in Disney California Adventure Park’s Hollywood Land and Keystone Clothiers in Disney’s Hollywood Studios are modeled after the Julian Medical Building.

== See also ==
- List of contributing properties in the Hollywood Boulevard Commercial and Entertainment District
