= Hollywood Post Office =

Historic building in California (1925–1988)

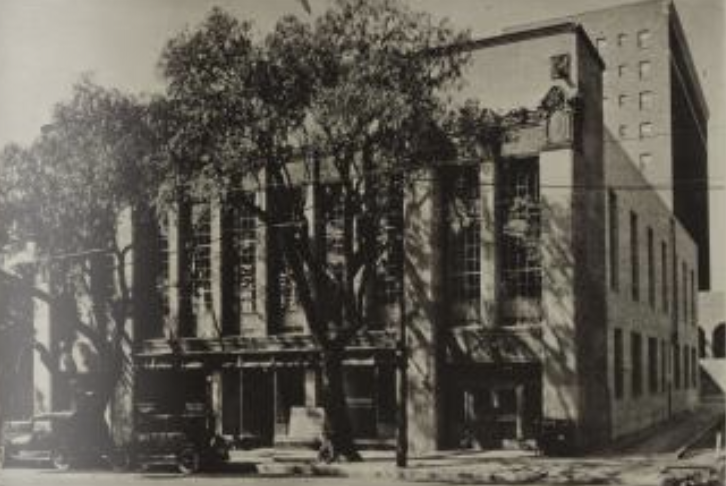
- The building in 1926
- Interactive map of the Hollywood Post Office area

General information
- Location: 1717 N. Vine Street, Hollywood, California
- Coordinates: 34.102°N 118.3273°W
- Year built: 1925
- Demolished: late 1980s/early 1990s

Technical details
- Floor count: 2

Design and construction
- Architecture firm: Morgan, Walls & Clements

Hollywood Post Office, also known as Old Post Office, was a historic building located at 1717 N. Vine Street in Hollywood, California.

== History ==
Hollywood Post Office was built in 1925 by Morgan, Walls & Clements, the architectural firm responsible for many Los Angeles landmarks, including the Dominguez–Wilshire Building, Adamson House, Chapman Plaza, and the El Capitan, Music Box, Wiltern, Mayan, and Belasco theaters.

In 1985, the Hollywood Boulevard Commercial and Entertainment District was added to the National Register of Historic Places, with Old Post Office listed in the district. The listing notes that the building was "a prime candidate for restoration," but it was not listed as a contributing property.

In 1988, the building was vacated due to seismic concerns. It was torn down soon after.

== Architecture and design ==
Hollywood Post Office was built of brick and concrete and clad in metal sheathing. The building featured an elaborate Churrigueresque facade.
