= Highland Towers Apartments (Los Angeles) =

Historic building in Hollywood, California

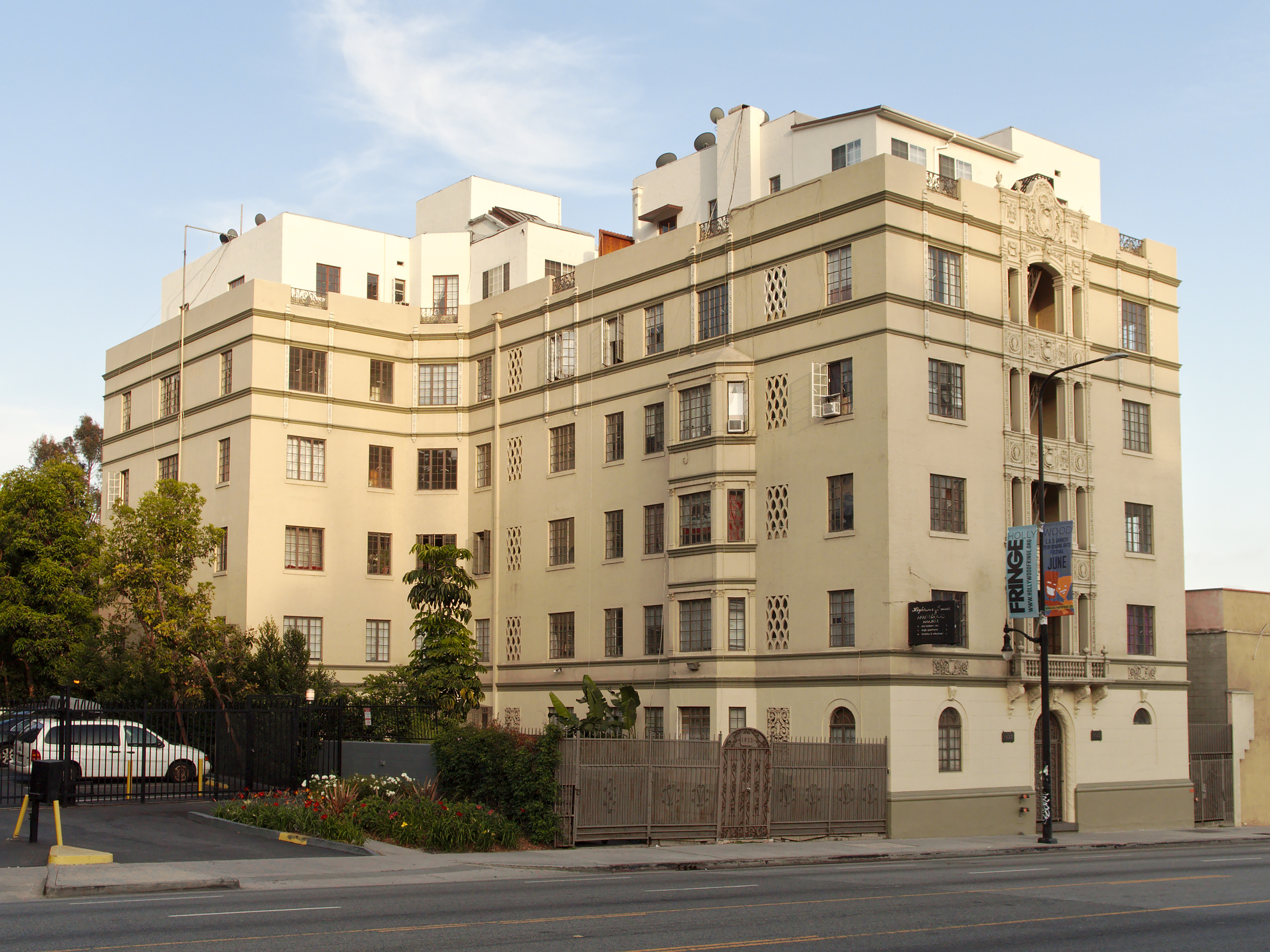
- The building in 2015
- Interactive map of the Highland Towers Apartments area

General information
- Location: 1920-1928 Highland Avenue, Hollywood, California
- Coordinates: 34.106°N 118.337°W
- Completed: c. 1929

Technical details
- Floor count: 6

Design and construction
- Architecture firm: Morgan, Walls and Clements

Los Angeles Historic-Cultural Monument
- Designated: October 16, 1990
- Reference no.: 475

Highland Towers Apartments, formerly Hotel Highland Towers, is a historic building located at 1920-1928 Highland Avenue in Hollywood, California. It was designated Los Angeles Historic Cultural Monument No. 475 in 1990.

== History ==
Highland Tower Apartments, built c. 1929, was designed by Morgan, Walls & Clements, the architectural firm responsible for many Los Angeles landmarks, including the Dominguez–Wilshire Building, Adamson House, Chapman Plaza, and the El Capitan, Music Box, Wiltern, Mayan, and Belasco theaters.

The building served as a hotel from c. 1930 to c. 1945, and at some point William Faulkner lived in the hotel's penthouse suite. May Robson and Thelma Todd have also lived in this building, the latter with her mother.

The building was designated Los Angeles Historic Cultural Monument No. 475 on October 16, 1990. The building was cited twice by the Health Department in the time leading up to this designation.

== Architecture and design ==
Highland Towers Apartments contains 48 units, is six stories in height, and features a rooftop garden, basement swimming pool, and carved wood cornices.
