= Jewelry Trades Building =

Building in Los Angeles, California

- U.S. Historic district – Contributing property
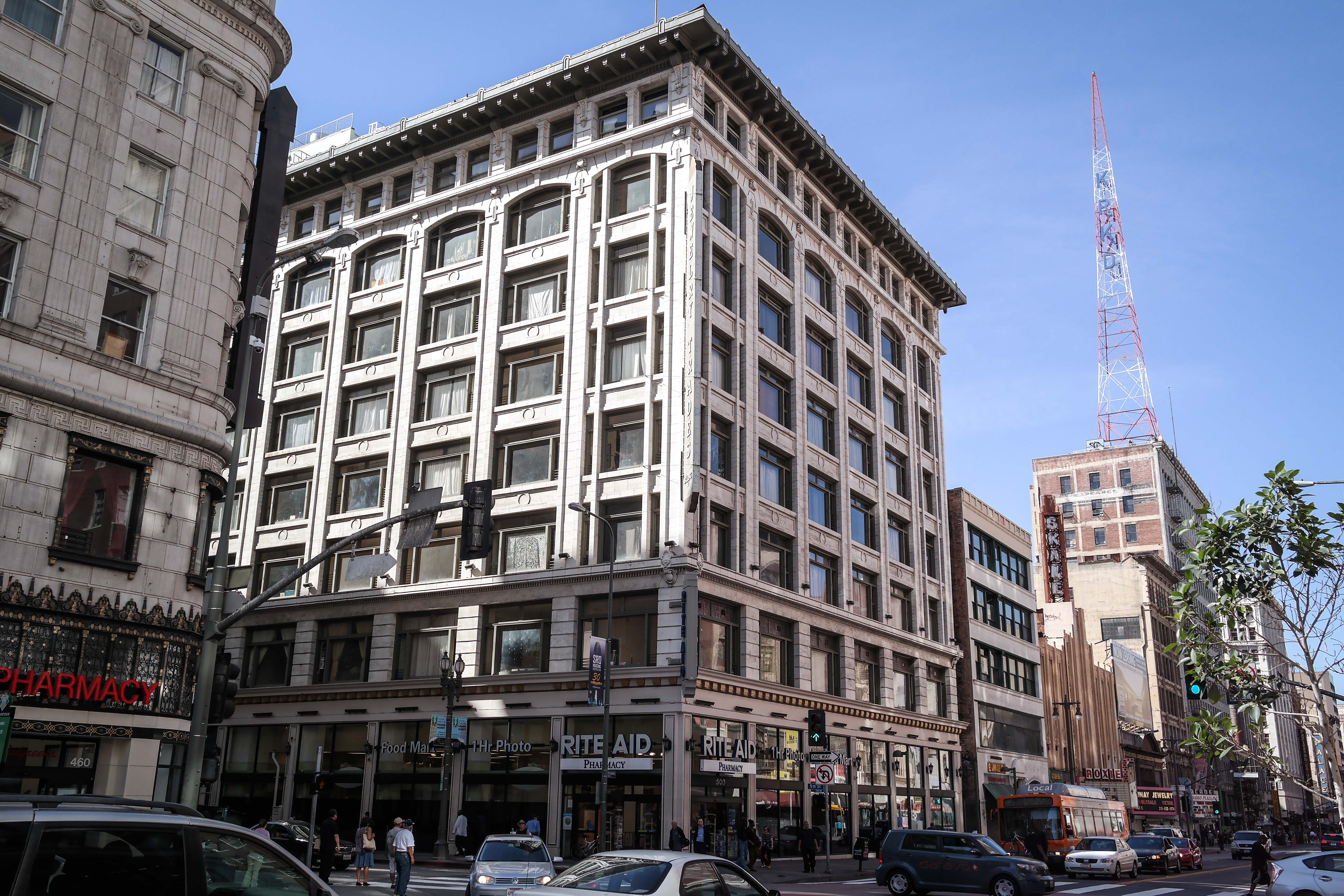
- The building in 2014

- Location within the Los Angeles metropolitan area
- Location: 500 S. Broadway and 220 W. 5th Street, Los Angeles, California
- Coordinates: 34°02′52″N 118°15′02″W
- Built: 1912
- Architect: Morgan, Walls & Morgan
- Architectural style: Romanesque
- Part of: Broadway Theater and Commercial District (ID79000484)
- Designated CP: May 9, 1979

Jewelry Trades Building, also known as Title Guarantee Block, is a historic eight-story highrise located at 500 S. Broadway and 220 W. 5th Street in the Broadway Theater District in the historic core of downtown Los Angeles.

== History ==
Jewelry Trades Building was built in 1912 by Morgan, Walls & Morgan, the architecture firm responsible for many buildings on Broadway, including the Arcade Theater, Globe Theater, Bumiller Building, Walter P. Story Building, Bullocks-Hollenbeck, and Haas Building.

In 1979, the Broadway Theater and Commercial District was added to the National Register of Historic Places, with Jewelry Trades Building listed as a contributing property in the district.

The building was converted to a 63-unit apartment complex in 2010. The conversion, which was done in conjunction with a similar conversion of the Broadway-Spring Arcade, had a combined cost of $34 million ($50.2 million in 2025).

== Architecture and design ==
Jewelry Trades Building is made of steel-framed concrete with a terra cotta facade and features a Romanesque design that includes heavy cornice and arched windows. The interior is finished in Italian marble, plate glass, and oak, and features wide corridors meant to resemble a street.

A metal sign that reads "JEWELRY TRADES" is anchored to the building, and the building name is also highlighted through detailing above the entrance.

== See also ==
- List of contributing properties in the Broadway Theater and Commercial District
