= Highland Towers =

Highland Towers may refer to:

- Highland Towers Apartments (Los Angeles), California
- Highland Towers Apartments (Pittsburgh), Pennsylvania
- Highland Towers collapse, in Ampang, Malaysia
