= Citadel Outlets =

Outlet mall in Commerce, California, US

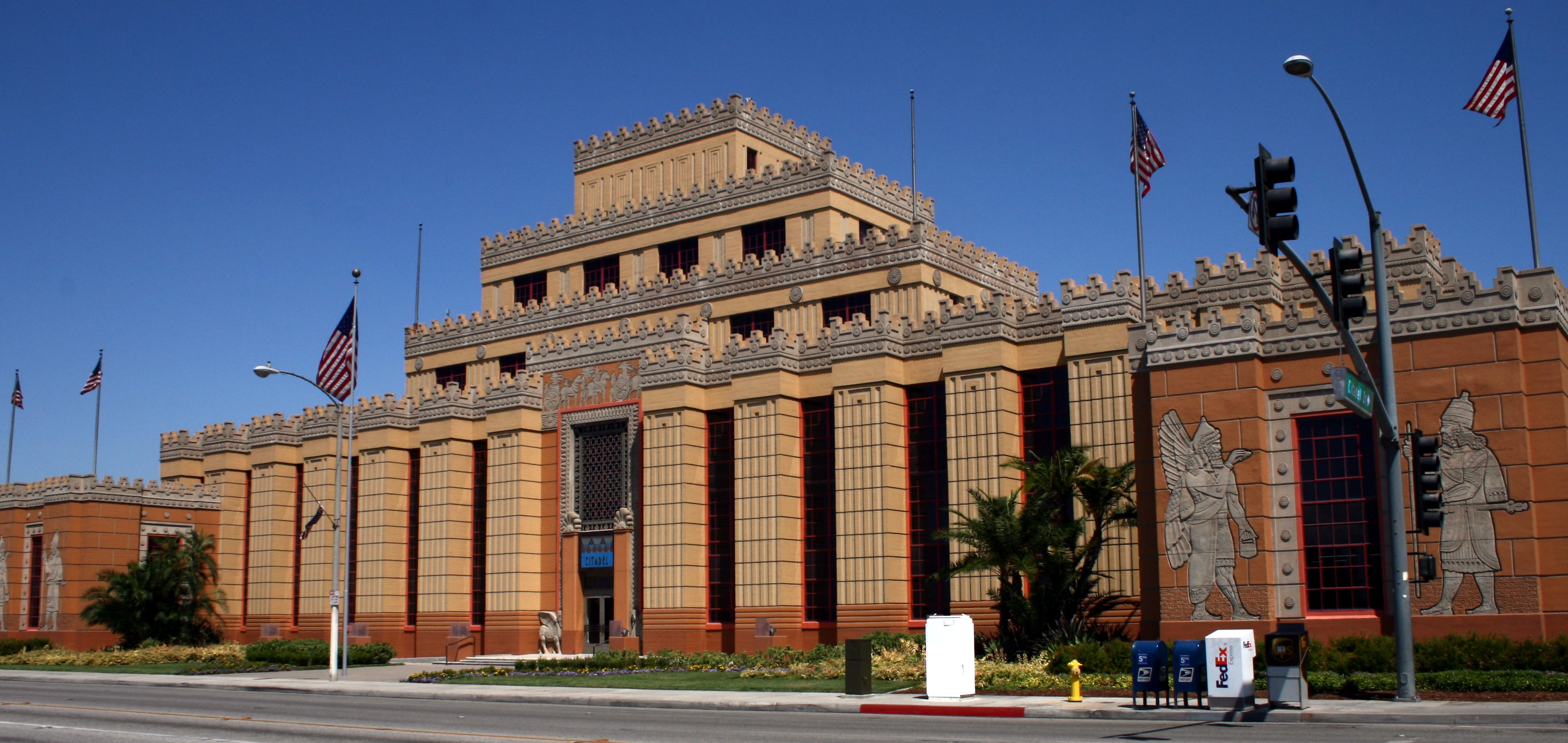
- Exterior of the former tire factory
- Location: Commerce, California, United States
- Coordinates: 34.0061°N 118.1511°W
- Address: 100 Citadel Drive, Los Angeles, California, 90040
- Developer: Trammell Crow Company
- Owner: Craig Realty Group
- Architect: Morgan, Walls and Clements
- Website: citadeloutlets.com

The Citadel Outlets is an outlet mall in the city of Commerce, California, along the Santa Ana Freeway southeast of Downtown Los Angeles. It was redeveloped from a tire factory.

== History ==
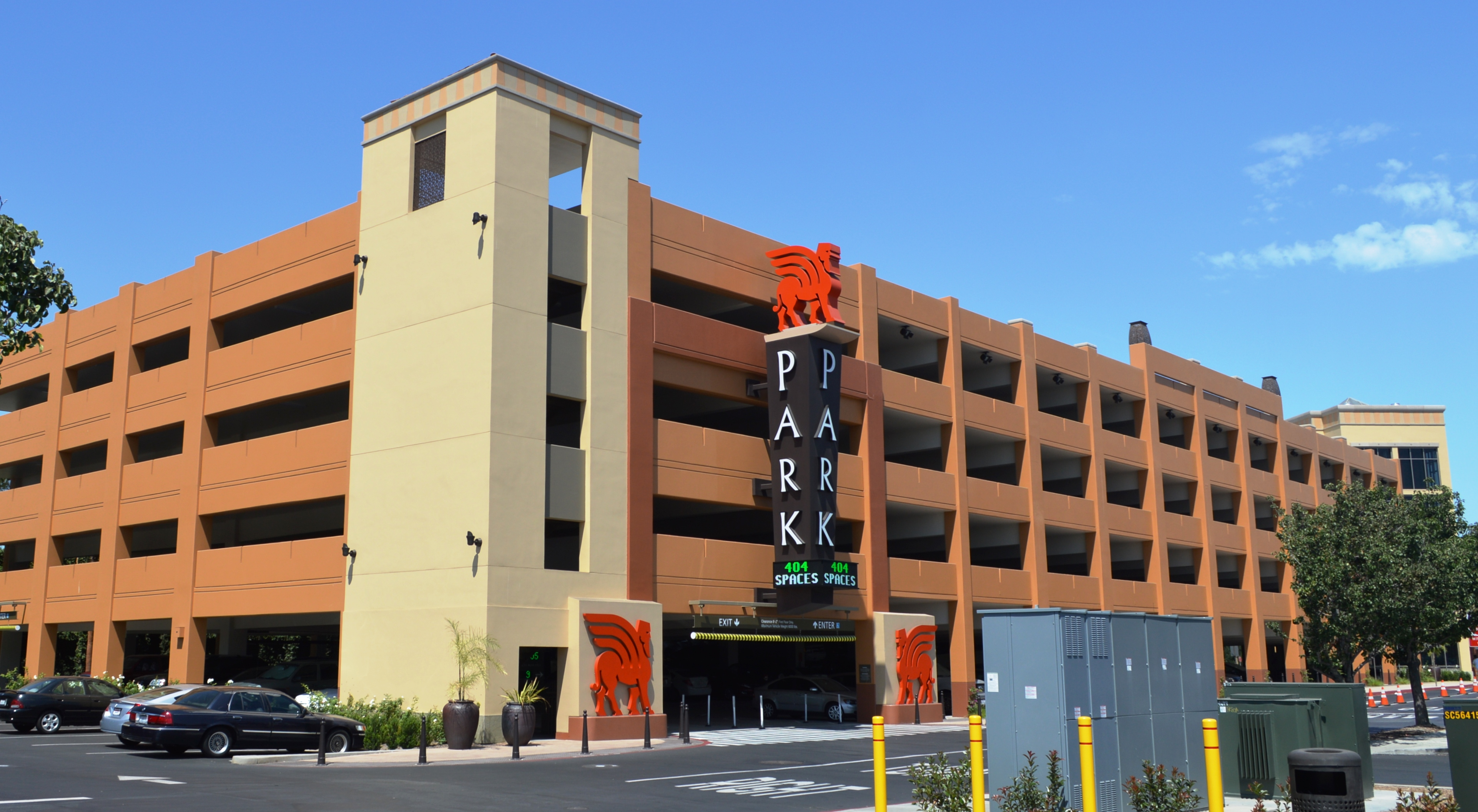
Parking lot

In 1929, architects Morgan, Walls and Clements, who also designed Los Angeles' Mayan Theater, built the Samson Tire and Rubber Co. factory. The structure was constructed in the Exotic Revival architectural style, modeled after the castle of Assyrian king Sargon II. The factory closed in 1978, and the city of Commerce bought the site for $14 million in 1983. In 1990, Trammell Crow Company was hired for the site's $118 million redevelopment into an outlet center and adjacent 201-room Wyndham Garden Hotel (now a Doubletree).

After the partnership defaulted on its ground lease the city sold the complex to Craig Realty bought for $50 million in July 2002, with the condition that Craig would double the size of the mall.

A 157,000-square-foot (14,600 m^{2}) expansion was completed in 2010.

In 2019, an expansion was proposed to construct three new hotels, new retail, and a monorail to link the property. The two-story building would be used for Adventure Experiential Retail.

== Proposed LA Metro Station ==
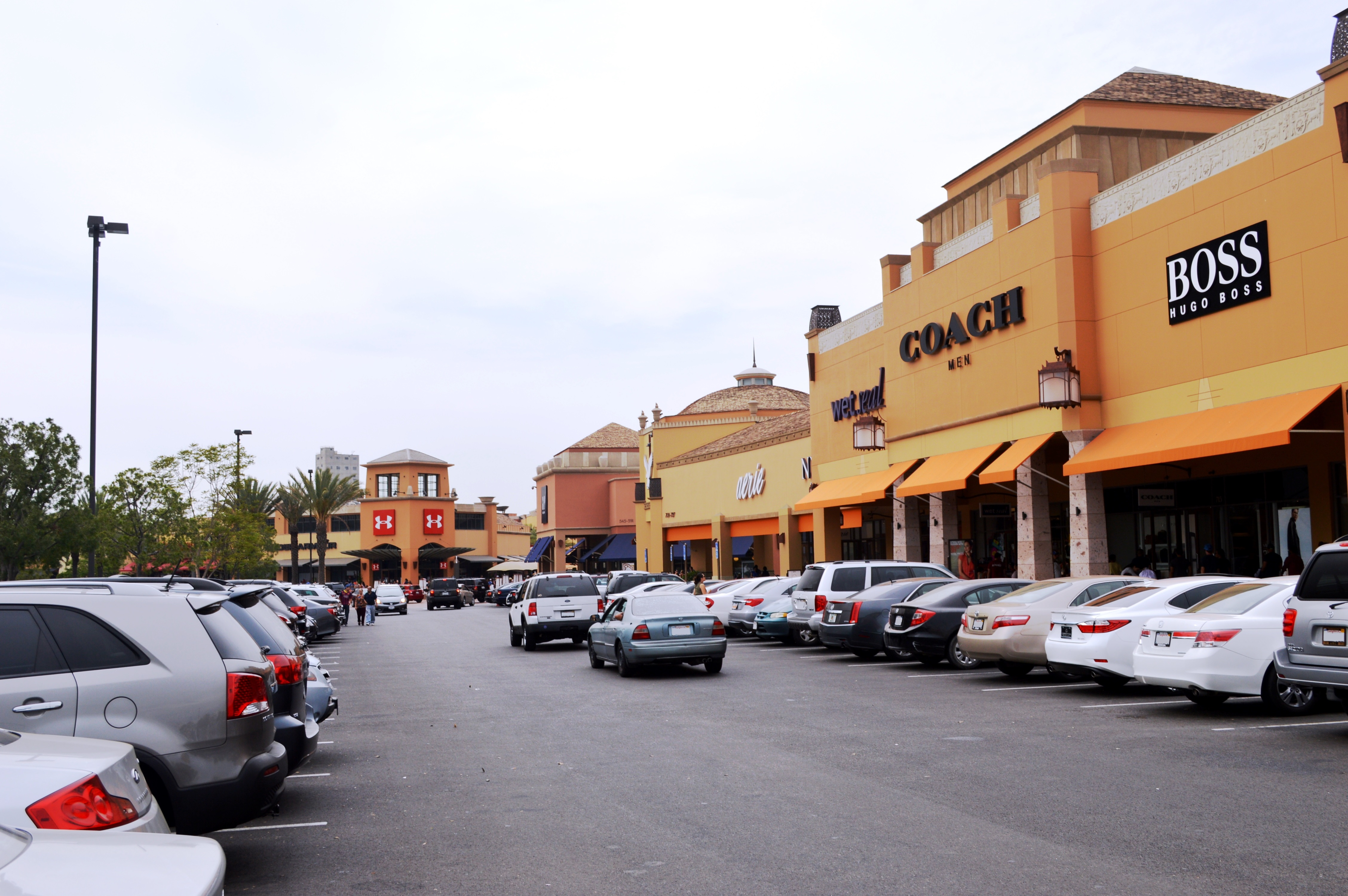
Outlet storefronts

As part of the LA Metro E Line Eastside Transit Corridor, a station at the Citadel Outlets is planned. The line is projected to break ground in 2029, with start of operations in 2035 as part of the E Line.
