= Morgan, Walls & Clements =

Los Angeles architectural firm

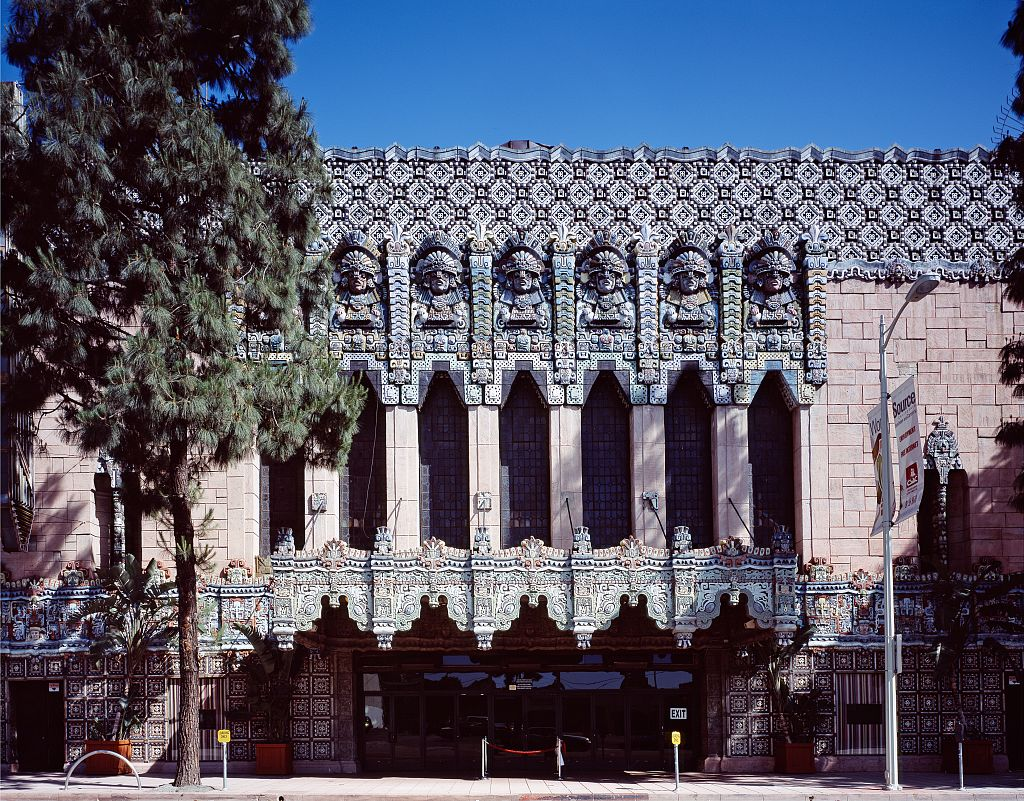
Mayan Theater, Los Angeles

Morgan, Walls & Clements was an architectural firm based in Los Angeles, California and was responsible for many of the city's landmarks, dating back to the late 19th century.

== History ==
Morgan, Walls & Clements earliest precursor, Kysor & Hennessy, consisted of partners Ezra F. Kysor and John F. Hennessy, then in 1880, Hennessy left and the firm's draftsman Octavius Morgan was promoted to partner, creating Kysor & Morgan. John A. Walls joined in 1886 to create Kysor, Morgan and Walls, and Kysor retired in 1890, resulting in Morgan and Walls. Around 1910, Morgan's son O.W. Morgan was promoted, creating Morgan, Walls and Morgan, then the elder Morgan retired and designer Stiles O. Clements was promoted, resulting in Morgan, Walls and Clements.

Morgan, Walls and Clements hit its stride with a series of theaters and commercial projects around MacArthur Park. Clements often worked in Spanish Colonial revival and Mayan revival styles, but their major project was the black Art Deco Richfield Tower, a commanding presence in downtown from its 1928 completion to its 1969 destruction. Walls did not live to see the completion of the building, as he had died in 1922.

Clements left the firm in 1937 to start his own practice, Stiles O. Clements & Associates, where he remained until his retirement in 1965.

== Works ==
Notable works of Morgan, Walls & Clements and its predecessors include (in Los Angeles, California unless otherwise noted):

=== National Register of Historic Places ===
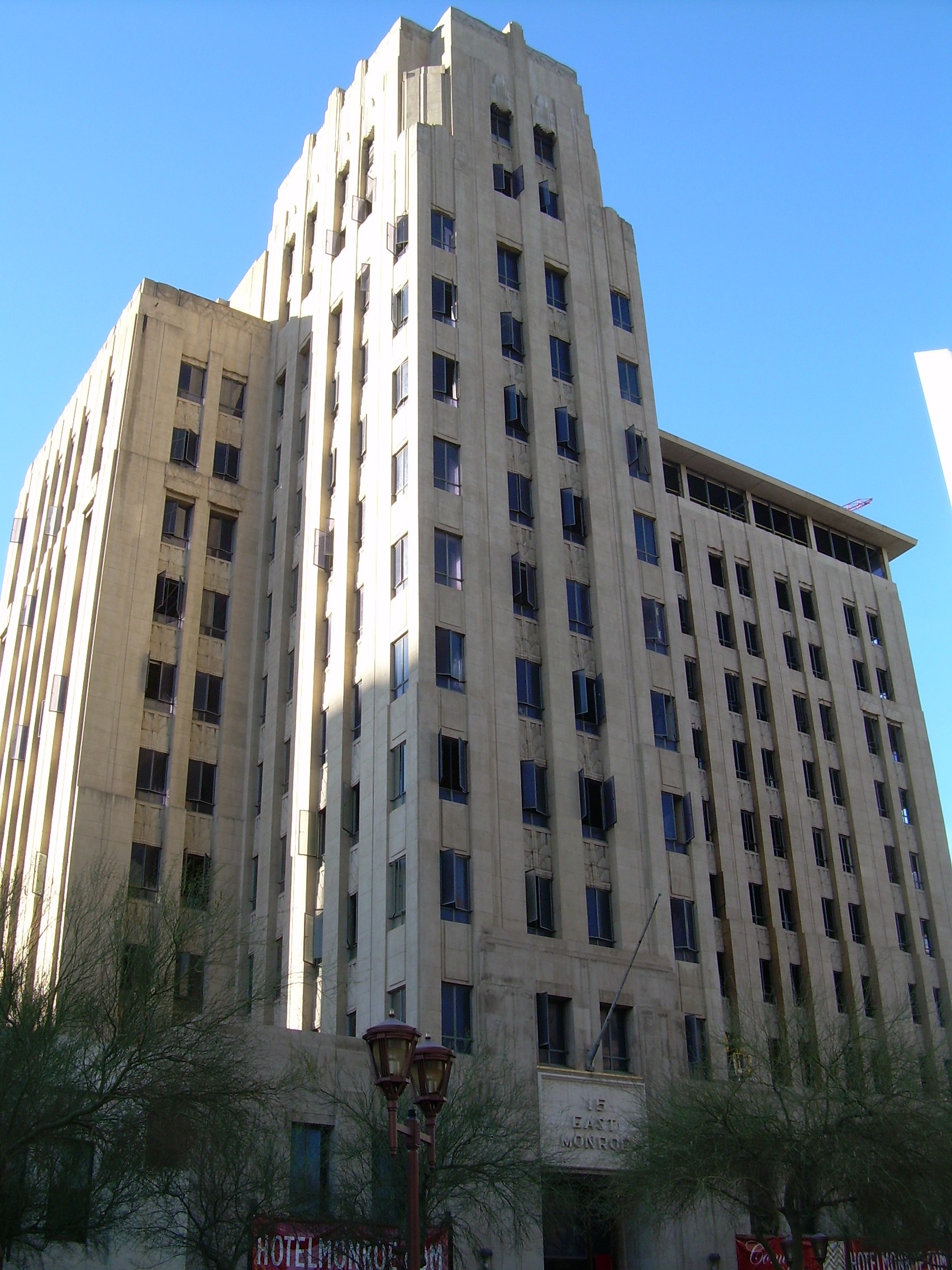
Professional Building

- Kerckhoff Building and Annex, 1907–1908 and 1916
- Adamson House, Malibu, California, 1930
- Pellissier Building and Wiltern Theatre, 1931
- Professional Building, Phoenix, Arizona, 1932

==== Broadway Theater and Commercial District ====
- Bumiller Building, 1906
- Eshman Building, 1909
- Walter P. Story Building, 1909
- Arcade Theater, 1910
- Bullock's-Hollenbeck, 1912
- Title Guarantee Block, 1913
- Blackstone Department Store Building, 1939 renovation

==== Spring Street Financial District ====
- Farmers and Merchants Bank Building, 1905
- Hellman Building, 1905-14
- Van Nuys Building, 1911
- Barclay's Bank, 1919

==== Hollywood Boulevard Commercial and Entertainment District ====
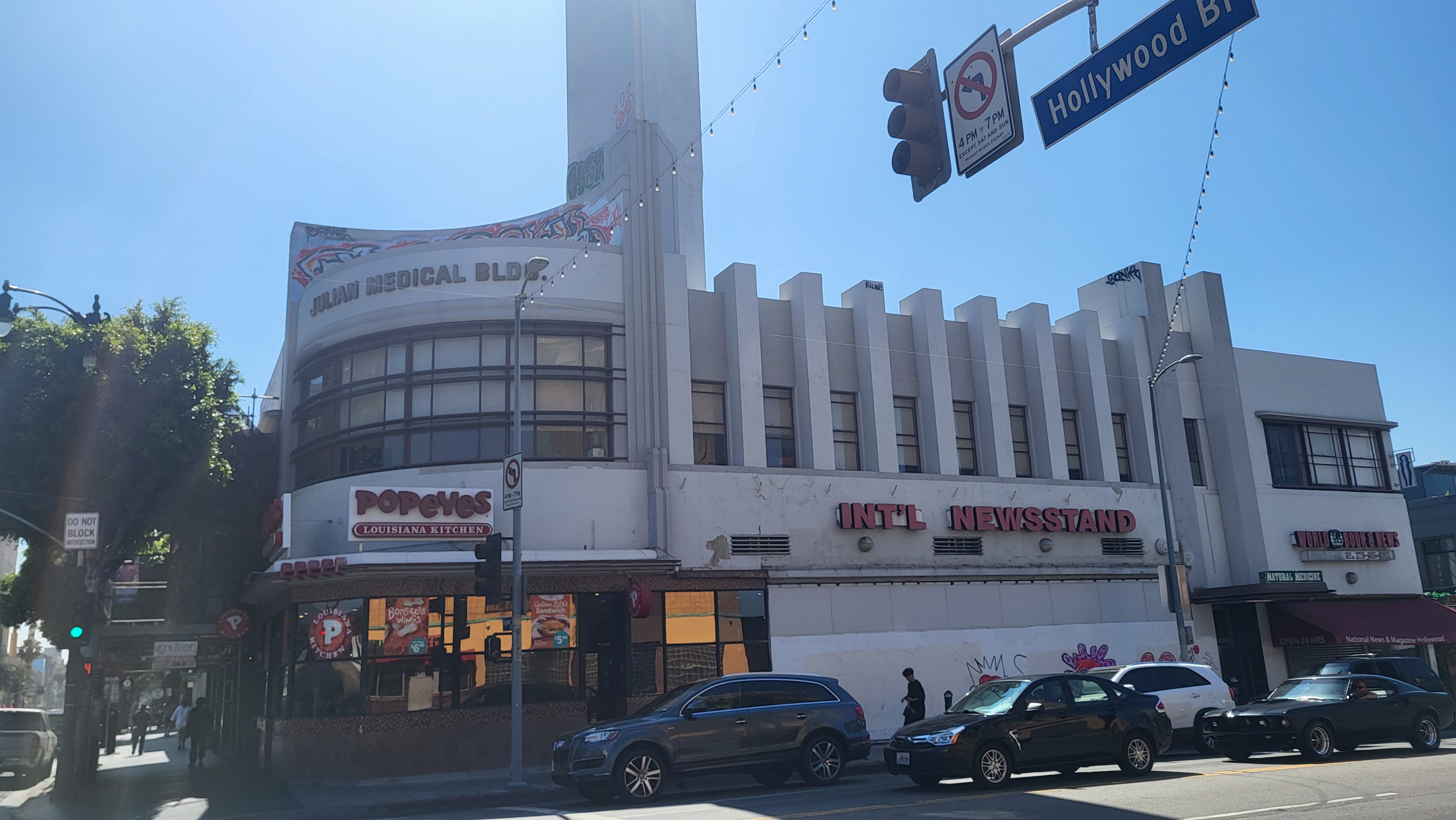
Julian Medical Building, considered "one of the crowning achievements of Streamline Moderne"

- El Capitan Theatre, 1926
- Hallmark Building, 1931 remodel
- Julian Medical Building, 1934
- Bank of America Building, 1935 remodel

=== Los Angeles Historic Cultural Monuments ===
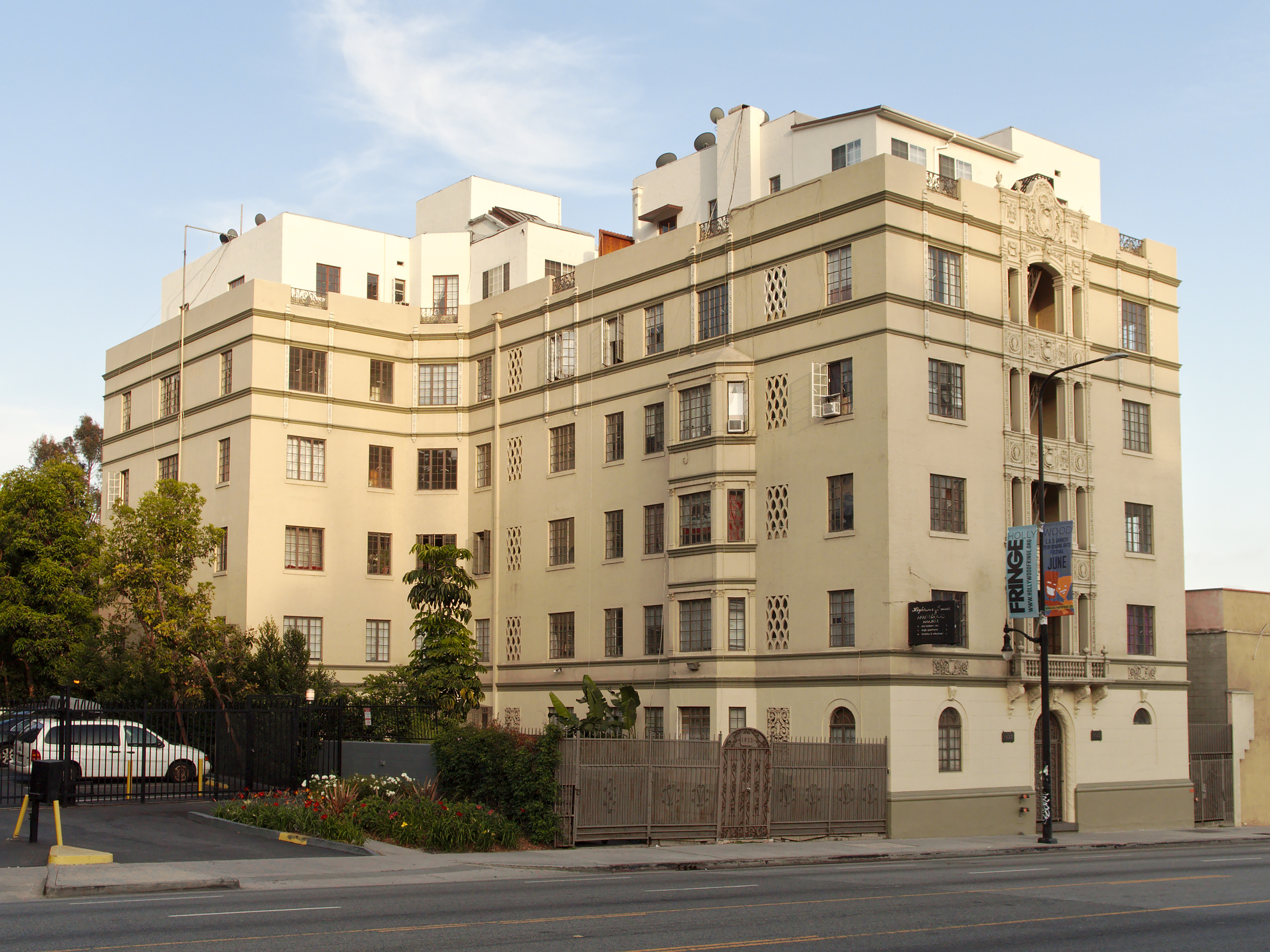
Highland Towers Apartments

- Arcade Theater, 1910
- Artisan's Patio Complex, 1918
- El Capitan Theatre, 1926
- Belasco Theater, 1926
- Mayan Theater, 1927
- Chapman Plaza, 1929
- Highland Towers Apartments, c. 1929
- Pellissier Building and Wiltern Theatre, 1931

=== Long Beach City Landmarks ===
- Famous Department Store, 1928-9

=== Other Works ===
==== Los Angeles ====
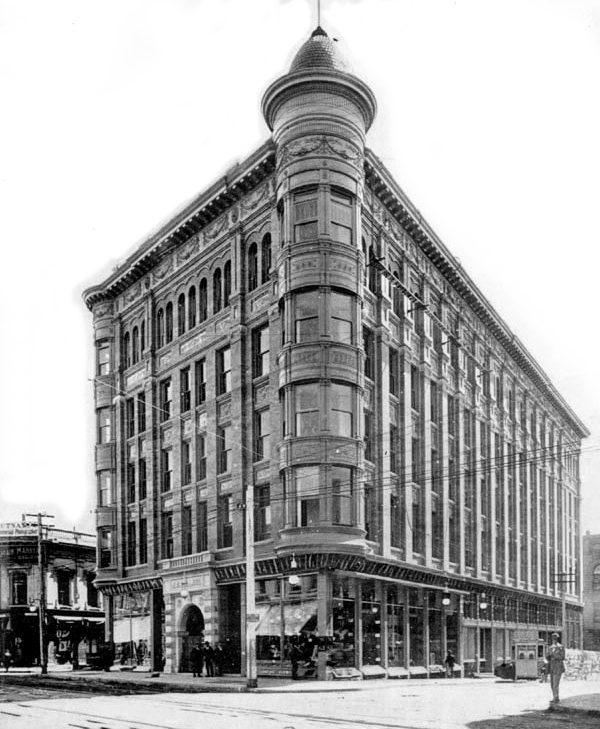
Bullard Block in 1900

- Bullard Block, 1895 (demolished 1925)
- Tally's Electric Theater, 1902
- Parmelee-Dohrmann Building, 1906 (demolished)
- Van Nuys Apartments, 1913
- Haas Building, 1915
- Olive J. Cobb Building, 1924
- Hollywood Storage Company Building, 1925
- Hollywood Post Office, 1925 (demolished)
- Hollywood Chamber of Commerce Building, 1926
- Music Box Theater, 1926
- Ninth & Hill Building, 1926
- Downtown Shopping News, Printing & Distribution Building, 1927
- Richfield Tower, 1929 (demolished)
- Security Pacific Bank, 1930
- 900 N. La Brea Ave, 1930 (demolished)
- Leimert Theatre, 1931
- Dominguez-Wilshire Building, 1931
- 5450–4 Wilshire Blvd, 1936

==== Elsewhere in southern California ====
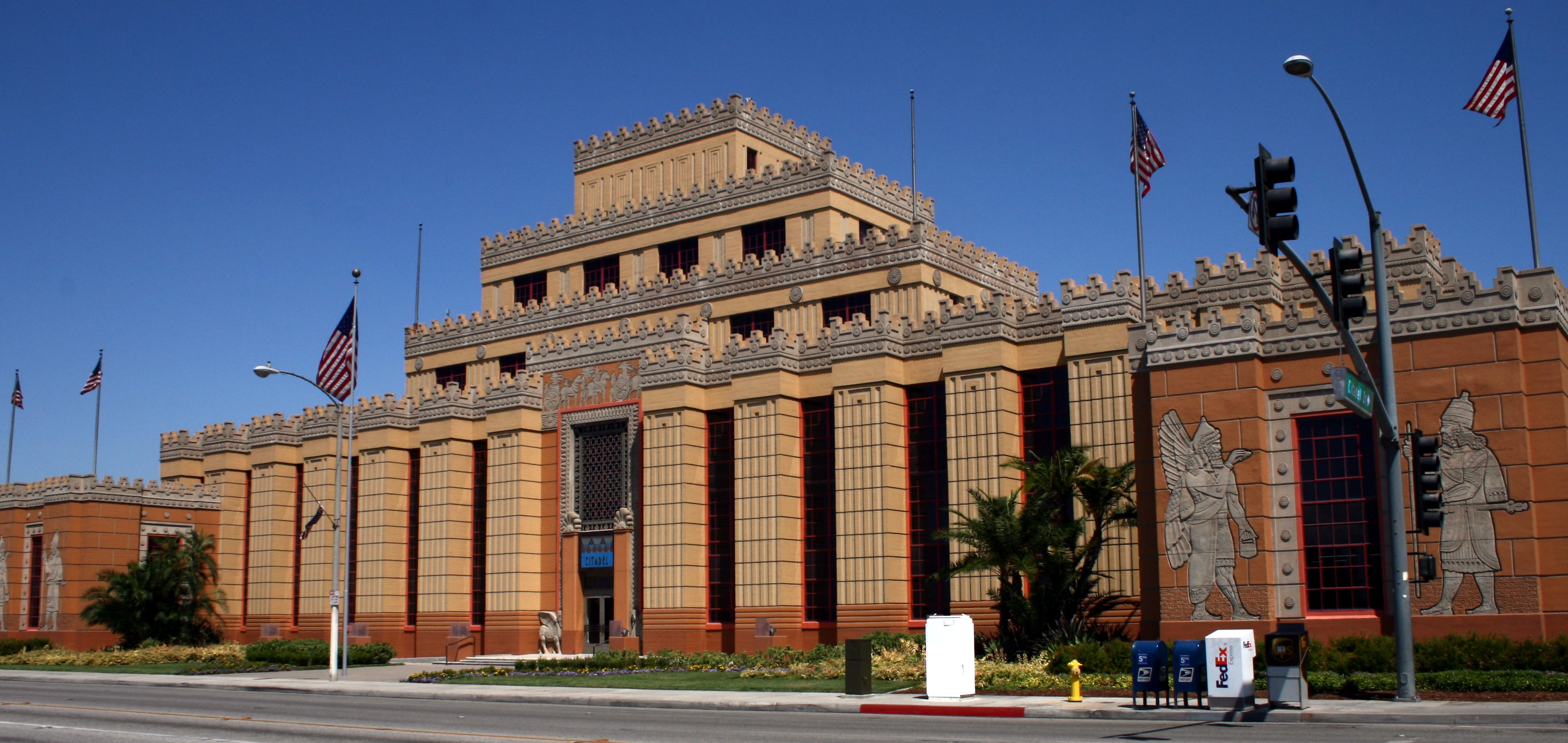
Samson Tire and Rubber Factory, now Citadel Outlets

- Santa Clara Roman Catholic Church, Oxnard, 1903
- First National Bank, Orange, 1928
- Adams Square Building, Glendale, 1928
- Samson Tire and Rubber Factory, Commerce, 1929-30.
