= Van Nuys Building =

Building in Los Angeles, California

- U.S. Historic district – Contributing property
- Los Angeles Historic-Cultural Monument
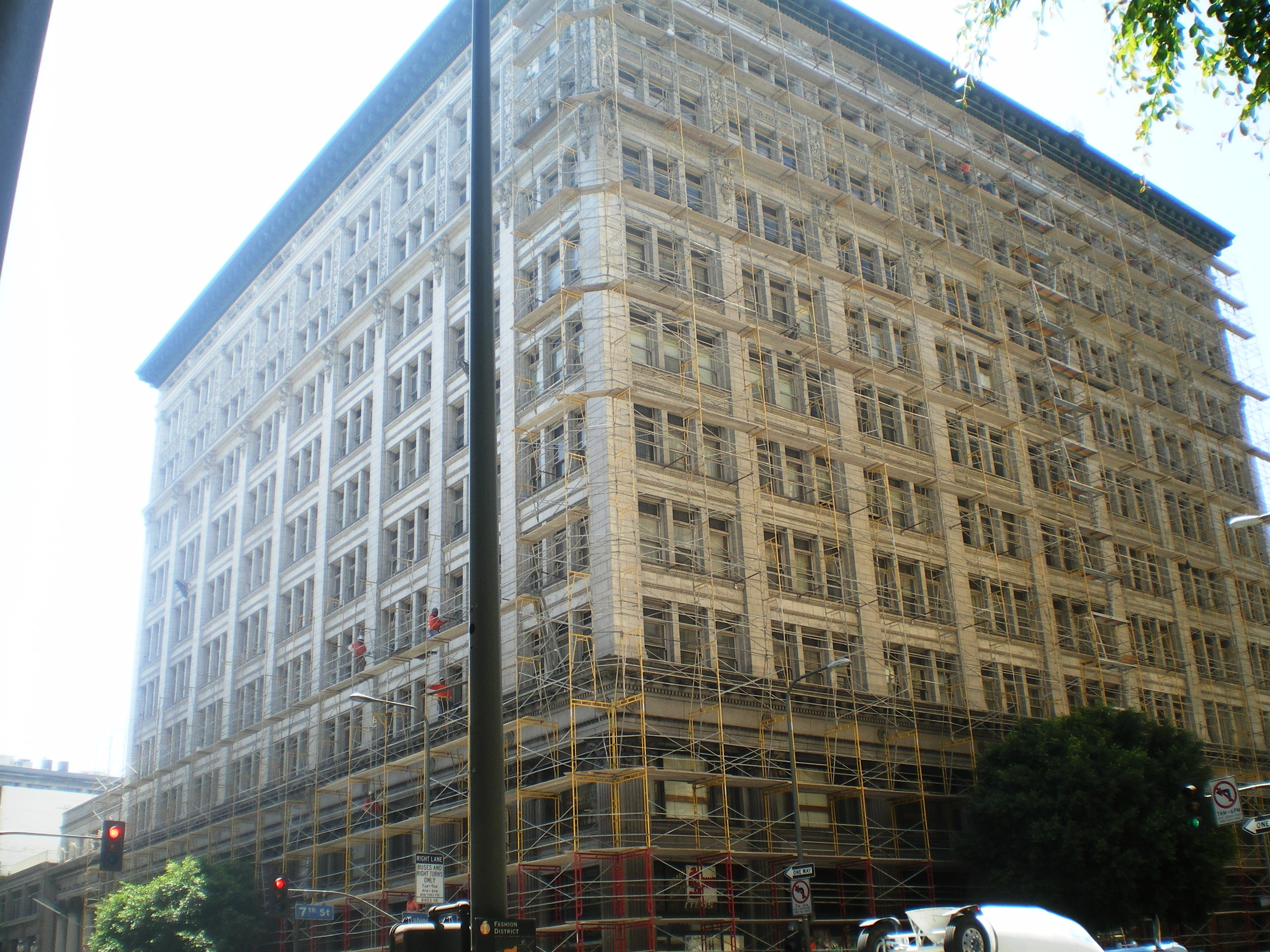
- The building surrounded by scaffolding in 2008

- Location within the Los Angeles metropolitan area
- Location: 701 S. Spring Street and 204-212 W. 7th Street, Los Angeles, California
- Coordinates: 34.04449°N 118.25258°W
- Built: 1911, 1929
- Architects: Morgan, Walls and Morgan (1911); Morgan, Walls and Clements (1929)
- Architectural style: Classical/Beaux Arts
- Part of: Spring Street Financial District (ID79000489)
- LAHCM No.: 898

Significant dates
- Designated CP: August 10, 1979
- Designated LAHCM: December 5, 2007

Van Nuys Building, also known as I. N. Van Nuys Building and Van Nuys Apartments, is a historic building located at 701 S. Spring Street and 204-212 W. 7th Street in downtown Los Angeles, California. It is a Los Angeles Historic Cultural Monument and a contributing property in the Spring Street Financial District.

== History ==
Van Nuys Building was designed by Morgan, Walls and Morgan for Isaac Newton Van Nuys and built in 1911. Construction was budgeted at $1.25 million ($43.2 million in 2025), making it Los Angeles's most expensive office building when it was built. A garage designed by Morgan, Walls and Clements was added in 1929.

Numerous architects had offices in the building during its early years, including Morgan, Walls and Morgan, Carleton Winslow, Robert D. Farquhar, and Robert H. Orr.

The building was converted to low-income senior and handicapped housing with ground floor retail in the late 1970s/early 1980s. The City of Los Angeles paid $24.3 million ($86.1 million in 2025) to renovate the building; the renovations were completed in 1981 or 1982.

In 1979, the Spring Street Financial District was added to the National Register of Historic Places, with Van Nuys Building listed as a contributing property in the district. The building was declared Los Angeles Historic Cultural Monument No. 898 on December 5, 2007. The building is also a contributing property in the City of Los Angeles-recognized Seventh Street Commercial Historic District.

Related Companies purchased the property from Aimco in 2018.

== Architecture and design ==
Van Nuys Building is eleven-stories in height, rectangular in plan, and built with reinforced concrete in a steel frame. The United States Department of the Interior describes the building as having a "Classical style with Italianate details", while other sources including the City of Los Angeles and University of California describe the design as Beaux Arts.

The building's primary facades face north and west; the north facade contains eight bays and the west facade contains nine. Both facades feature a base-shaft-capital composition and are clad in terra cotta with granite at the base. The base also features two-story Corinthian columns, with equally tall storefront windows with high bulkheads between them. Cornice with dentils separate two story base from the third-through-eighth floor shaft above. On the shaft, vertical pilasters frame the bays and culminate in engaged capitals that help form another cornice, this one separating the eighth and ninth floors. The bays themselves contain three one-over-one wood sash windows in the shaft. In the capital, the bays are decorated in low-relief terra cotta frames, while a denticulated and bracketed cornice tops the building. The building's secondary south and west elevations are covered in painted stucco.

The building's western entrance fills the fourth bay and features a double-height opening with the name of the building inscribed above, all of which are highlighted with medallions and topped by a bracketed cornice. The entrance leads to a vestibule whose walls, ceiling, and floor are covered in marble, and the entrance also features three sets of wood and glass doors topped by transom windows. The lobby is clad in marble and features a coffered ceiling, pilasters that adorn the walls, and four highly detailed elevators with bas reliefs that depict symbols and scenes of California.

The building's garage addition is two stories, made with reinforced concrete, and matches the architectural style of the building.

== See also ==
- List of contributing properties in the Spring Street Financial District
