= Haas Building (Los Angeles) =

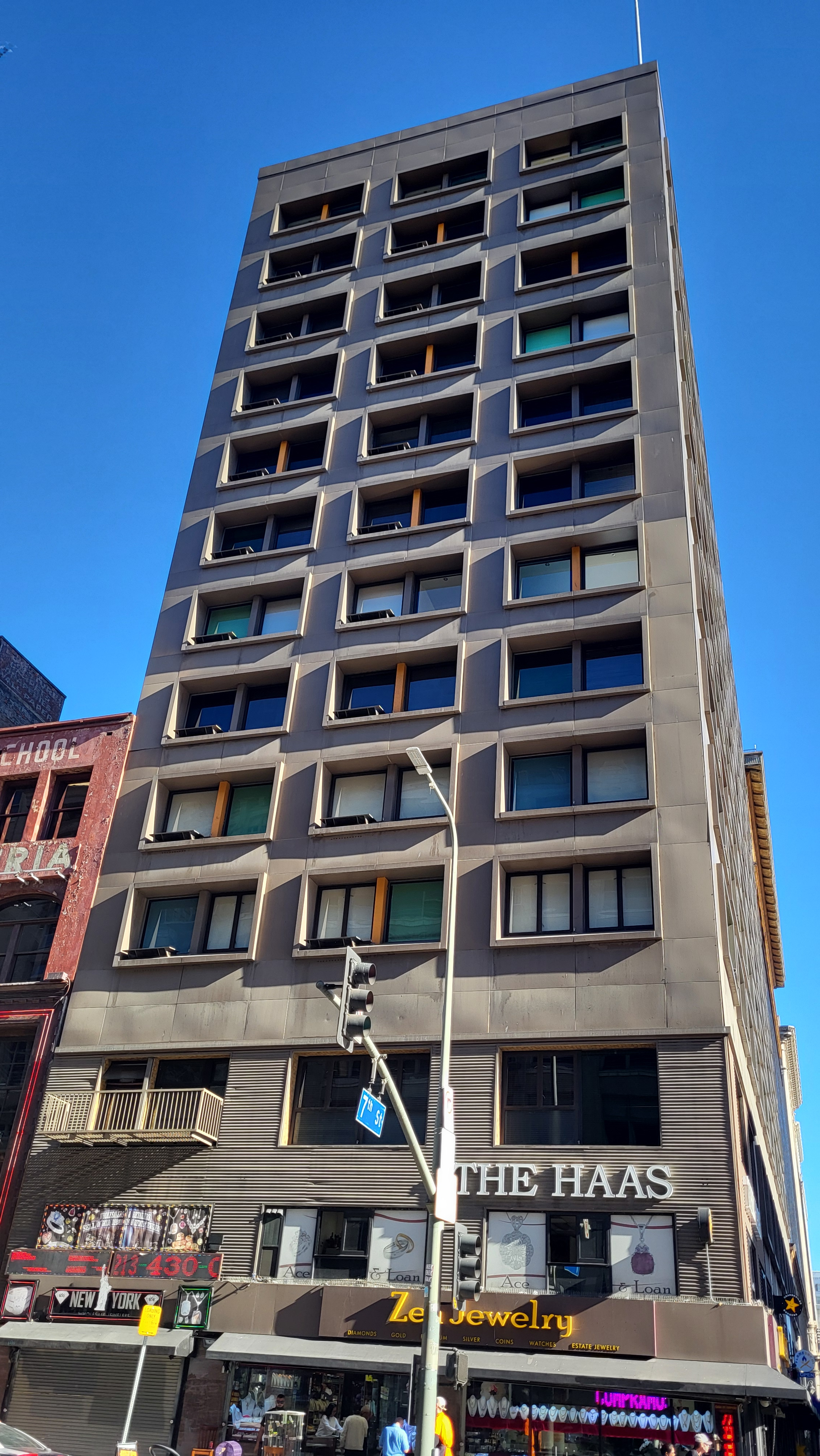
- The building in 2025
- Interactive map of the Haas Building area

General information
- Status: Complete and open for lease
- Type: Live/Work Lofts
- Architectural style: Beaux Arts
- Location: 219 West 7th Street and 660 South Broadway, Los Angeles, California
- Coordinates: 34°02′43″N 118°15′11″W
- Completed: 1915

Technical details
- Floor count: 12
- Lifts/elevators: 2

Design and construction
- Architect: Morgan Walls & Morgan
- Structural engineer: Charles Tan, S.E.
- Main contractor: Gabriel Frig & Big Star Builders, Inc

Haas Building, also known as the Broadway Exchange Building, is a historic twelve-story building located at 219 West 7th Street and 660 South Broadway, in the Broadway Theater District in the historic core of Downtown Los Angeles. It was originally owned by Abraham Haas and was completed in 1915.

== History ==
Hass Building was designed by Morgan Walls & Morgan for Abraham Haas and was built in 1915.

The building was modernized in 1974, and in 1979, when the Broadway Theater and Commercial District was added to the National Register of Historic Places, Hass Building was listed as a non-contributing property in the district.

In 2009, Haas Building was converted into 68 apartment units, including a rooftop penthouse. The building houses the Haas Trademark Collection by Wyndham as of 2024.

=== Tenants ===
Haas Building was considered "an excellent place to diagnose financial conditions in and around Los Angeles" due to the numer of realty buyers, sellers, leasers, and lessees that occupied the building in its early years. In 1915, Bank of Italy secured a 25-year lease for the building's ground floor and the basement. W J Pearson & Co. also occupied a large part of the 3rd floor.

Other major occupants of the Haas Building over the years include:

- Southern California Tourist Bureau
- Lee H. Stodder Company – exclusive selling agent for Burkhard Investment Company
- Southern California Oil Co.
- Ku Klux Klan – The Knights of the Ku Klux Klan held an office in the building in the early 1920s, but their lease was not renewed after the District Attorney raided the building, seizing two carloads of records.
- Chicago Tribune - Opened a branch office, hoping to attract California advertisers to the midwestern paper.
- Jewish Community Center-Chabad of Downtown Los Angeles

== Architecture and design ==
Haas Building was made to be one of the finest and most modern buildings of the time, built fireproof and with the latest steel frame, and featuring Beaux Arts architecture and terra cotta ornamentation. Architectural firm Morgan, Walls & Clements designed this building facing the street with a frontage of 55 feet (17 m) on Broadway by 150 feet (46 m) on Seventh. The building was 50 feet (15 m) by 75 feet (23 m) on the ground floor as well as the basement.

The building's corridors were floored with marble and seven-foot wainscoting, while the lobby's floors, walls, and ceiling were marble and the interior woodwork was made of solid mahogany. The building's fixtures and interiors, including three high-speed elevators, cost $100,000.

The building was modernized in the 1970s, with the classic exterior replaced by a metal skin. Despite this, a small portion of the original terra cotta is still visible on the 7th Street facade.

== In popular culture ==
Haas Building is shown briefly in the final episode of Season 3 of Squid Game. However, the name on the building was changed to "NAAS BLD'G".
