= Belasco Theater (Los Angeles) =

Historic theater in Los Angeles, California

- The Belasco
- Interactive map of Belasco Theater
- Address: 1050 S Hill Street; Los Angeles, California; U.S.
- Coordinates: 34°02′25″N 118°15′34″W
- Operator: Live Nation

Construction
- Opened: November 1, 1926; 99 years ago
- Reopened: March 19, 2011; 15 years ago
- Years active: 1926–1950, 2011–present
- Architect: Morgan, Walls & Clements

Los Angeles Historic-Cultural Monument
- Official name: Belasco Theater
- Designated: January 30, 1990
- Reference no.: 476

The Belasco Theater is a historic theater in Downtown Los Angeles, California. Opened in 1926, it operated as a playhouse and briefly as a movie theater until its closure in 1950, after which it was used for non-theater purposes. The building was renovated and reopened as a music venue called The Belasco in 2011. Live Nation became its operator in 2020.

Oil tycoon Edward L. Doheny commissioned the theater's construction; local architectural firm Morgan, Walls & Clements designed it in the Churrigueresque style. It opened to the public on November 11, 1926, with a production of the play Gentlemen Prefer Blondes.

== History ==
In 1926, Los Angeles-area oil pioneer Edward L. Doheny commissioned two theaters, the Belasco and the neighboring Mayan Theater, in an effort to bolster the entertainment scene in the city. The Mayan was intended for comedy and musicals whereas the Belasco was intended for legitimate theatre. Doheny hired local architecture firm Morgan, Walls & Clements to design both buildings; Stiles O. Clements took the lead on the Belasco project. The venue was originally called the Doheny Theatre but was renamed in honor of New York playwright David Belasco during the development phase. The Belasco opened on November 1, 1926, with the play Gentlemen Prefer Blondes.

In the 1930s, the Belasco was a participant in the New Deal-era Federal Theatre Project, a program created to boost the arts after the Great Depression. In 1948, the Doheny family estate sold the Belasco to Belco Properties, which intended to use the space for burlesque shows and film screenings. The theater's new format came to an end on June 7, 1950, when the final double feature was screened.

Days after its closure as a theater, the Belasco building was reopened by the Immanuel Gospel Church, which had purchased the property for US$200,000. In 1973, the Metro Community Church (MCC), an early homosexual church, purchased the building following the destruction of its previous chapel. The MCC unsuccessfully attempted to sell the building for $2.1 million in 1985. The congregation ultimately moved out of the space in August 1987 and a local developer purchased the building a year later.

Following the 1988 purchase, the Belasco remained without regular use for over two decades. On March 19, 2011, the building was reopened as a music venue called The Belasco. Live Nation became the operator of the facility in 2020.

== In popular culture ==
- The Belasco made one of its earliest media appearances in the 1949 burlesque feature Midnight Frolics.
- The 1999 comedy film Being John Malkovich features the Belasco in a rehearsal scene.
- The 1999 horror film End of Days briefly features the building as an abandoned movie theater.
- The 2001 thriller film Swordfish depicts the Belasco.
- The 2005 period drama film Memoirs of a Geisha features the theater.
- The Belasco appears in the 2006 psychological thriller film The Prestige.
- The 2012 comedy film This is 40 features the Belasco exterior and interior during the Graham Parker & The Rumour live performance scene.
- The 2014 musical film Jersey Boys features the Belasco's lobby and auditorium.

== See also ==
- List of Los Angeles Historic-Cultural Monuments in Downtown Los Angeles
