= The Fonda Theatre =

Concert venue in Los Angeles, California

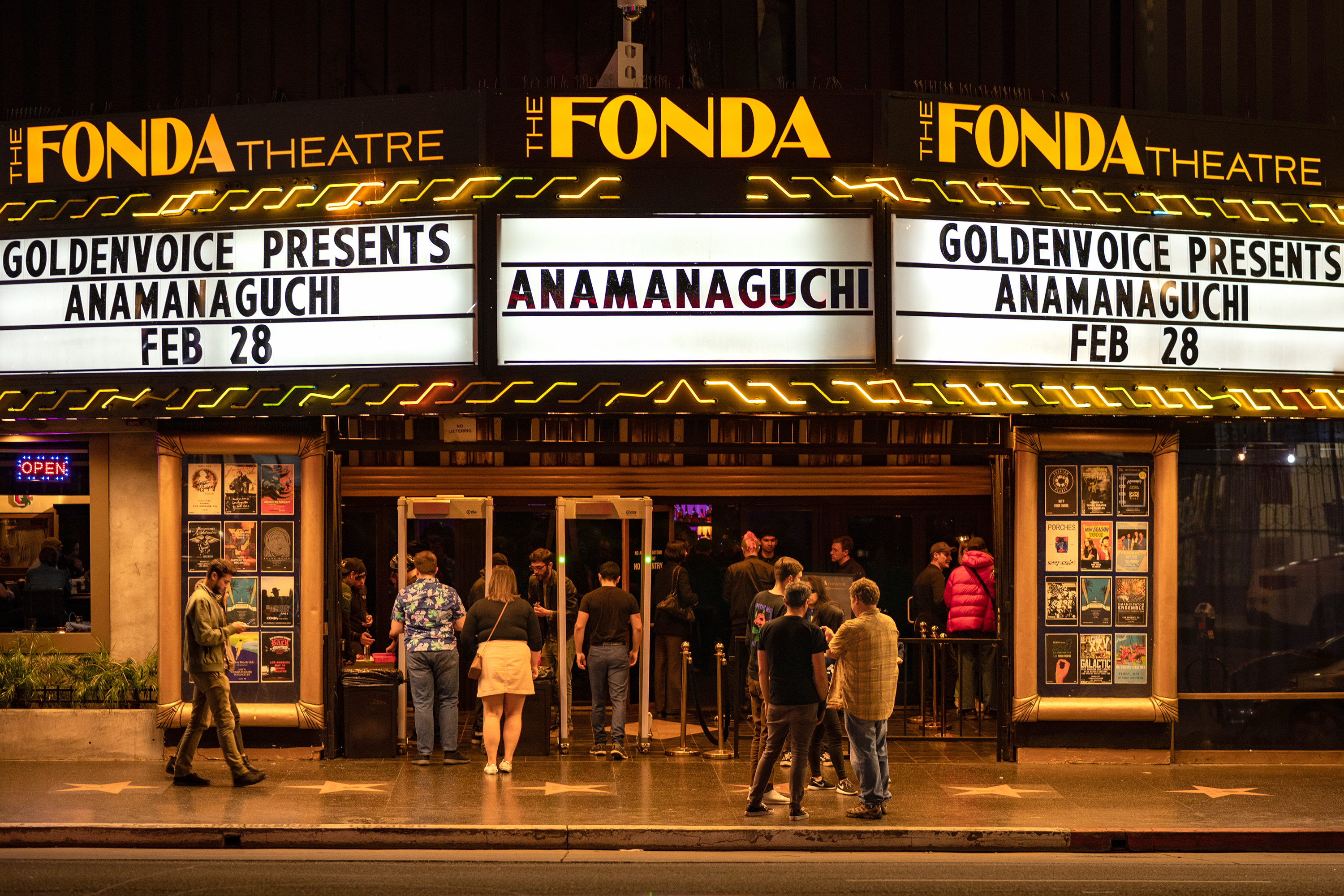
- The Fonda Theatre in 2020
- Interactive map of The Fonda Theatre
- Former names: Music Box Theatre; Guild Theatre; Fox Theatre; Pix Theatre
- Address: 6126 Hollywood Boulevard; Hollywood, California; United States
- Coordinates: 34.101642°N 118.323259°W
- Operator: Goldenvoice
- Capacity: 1,200
- Current use: Music venue
- Public transit: Hollywood/Vine

Construction
- Opened: October 20, 1926
- Architect: Morgan, Walls & Clements

Website
- fondatheatre.com

The Fonda Theatre (formerly Music Box Theatre, Guild Theatre, Fox Theatre, and Pix Theatre) is a concert venue located on Hollywood Boulevard in Los Angeles, California. Designed in the Spanish Colonial Revival style, the 31,000-square-foot (2,900 m^{2}) theater has hosted live events, films, and radio broadcasts.

== History ==
On October 20, 1926, the Carter DeHaven Music Box opened with a revue called Fancy. It had been planned to open the theatre two days earlier, however, a postponement was caused by the illness of Arthur Kay, a principal actor. Among the first investors in the new theater were John Barrymore, John Gilbert, Reginald Denny, King Vidor, and Mae Murray.

The Music Box switched from revues to legitimate theater in 1927 with the west coast première of Chicago, starring Clark Gable and Nancy Carroll. Stage plays continued at the Music Box for nearly two decades—aside from a period beginning in 1936 when the site was used as a broadcasting studio by Lux Radio Theater.

In 1945, Fox West Coast purchased the building and remodeled it for film exhibition in a Streamline Moderne decor, which included covering the Spanish Colonial Revival façade with sheet metal. Opening in February 1945, the theater showed movies for 32 years; first as the Guild Theatre, then as the Fox Theatre, and finally as the Pix Theatre, before closing its doors in 1977.

The Nederlander Organization reopened the house as a legitimate theater in 1985 and renamed it in honor of film and stage actor Henry Fonda. In ensuing years, productions such as the Pulitzer Prize winning play Glengarry Glen Ross, and Driving Miss Daisy graced the stage.

Efforts to restore the theater to its Roaring Twenties state began in 2002, culminating in the original name being placed back on the marquee. In 2012, Goldenvoice took over the Music Box and changed the name back to the Fonda Theatre. The theater was named the top venue in Los Angeles by LA Weekly in 2015.

== Notable performances ==
- Avenged Sevenfold filmed a music video for the song "Unholy Confessions" on March 6, 2004 at the Fonda Theatre.
- The Rolling Stones played the Fonda Theatre on May 20, 2015, performing their Sticky Fingers album in its entirety for the first time. The show served as the opening night for their 2015 Zip Code Tour, and was recorded and released as its own album.
- The Bachelor was filmed live at the Fonda Theatre on January 7, 2019.
- Socialite, entrepreneur, model, and singer Paris Hilton performed at the Fonda Theatre on June 7, 2023.
- YouTuber, Twitch Streamer, and Singer-Songwriter Dream performed at the Fonda Theatre on September 26–27, 2023.
- The Regrettes played their final, sold-out shows at the Fonda Theatre in Los Angeles on December 19, 20, and 21, 2023.
- YouTuber, Twitch Streamer, and comedian TommyInnit performed at the Fonda Theatre in 2025.
- Robyn performed an intimate, exclusive comeback show at The Fonda Theatre in Los Angeles on November 19, 2025, six years after she last toured or released new music.
- Sir Paul McCartney performed there in a two-night run on March 27–28, 2026.
- Season 13 of the sketch comedy show MadTV was filmed at the Music Box Theatre.
