= Chapman Plaza =

Building in Los Angeles, California, US

Coordinates: 34.0639°N 118.2973°W

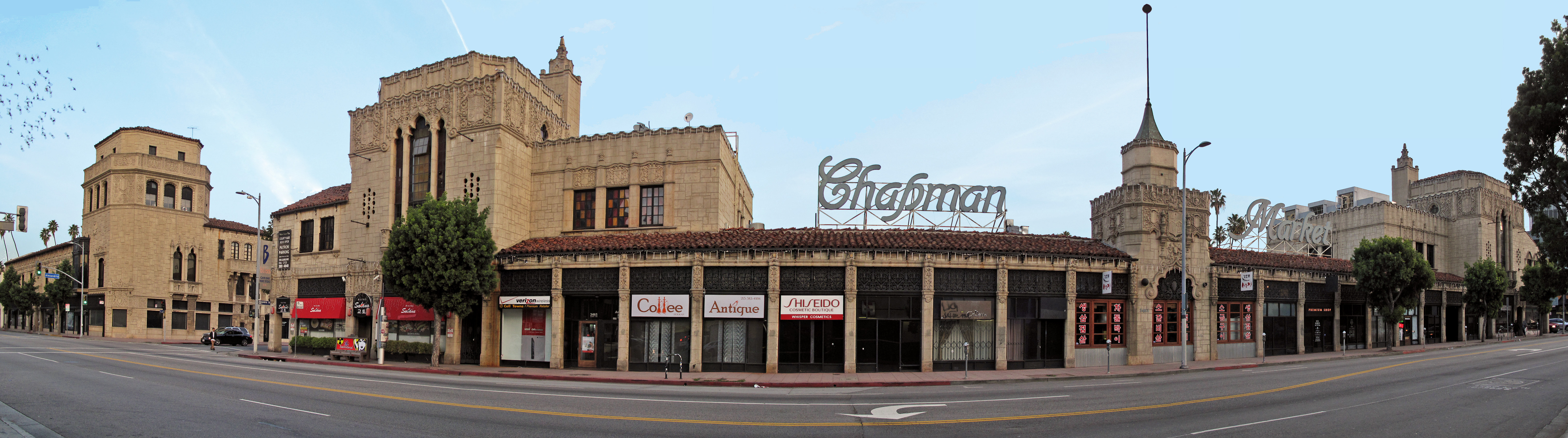
Chapman Plaza with Chapman Park Studio Building on the left

Chapman Plaza (also known as Chapman Park Market) is a building located between West Sixth Street and Alexandria Avenue in Los Angeles, California. The historic plaza building is about 50,000 square feet and is located in the heart of Koreatown, hosting several restaurants, bars, and cafes. The address is 3465 W 6th St, Los Angeles, CA 90020.

== History ==
After its construction in 1928, the plaza opened in 1929 and was one of the first markets designed for easy access of automobiles. The plaza was constructed with big parking spots in the middle with numerous stores surrounding the lot. Chapman Plaza served higher class neighborhoods such as Fremont Place, Windsor Square and Hancock Park in Los Angeles. Also, the plaza was built in set with Chapman Park Studio building on the other side of Alexandria Avenue.

The plaza was built during the Spanish Revival movement period in 1920s to 1930s in Los Angeles by renowned architecture firm Morgan, Walls & Clements. The architects practiced Art Deco and Streamline Moderne architecture creating buildings in Los Angeles such as the El Capitan and Mayan theaters. As one of Spanish Revival style building, Chapman Plaza has “fortress-like façade, with thick concrete walls…[with] ornate, Churrigueresque towers". The interior of the building has “high ceilings, arched windows, double-wide hallways and an artisan showroom” with the exterior consisting “courtyard, fountains/statues, gardens patios and rooftop views”.

== Current ==
On August 30, 1988, the building was named as Los Angeles Historic-Cultural Monument (#386). Chapman Plaza was planned for renovation with $4.5 million budget in order to transform the space into a “place of beauty and an urban meeting ground” and bring back the “charm of early Los Angeles”. It went through big renovation project in 1990 with The Ratkovich Company (owned by Wayne Ratkovich) and architect Brenda Levin.

In 2016, Chapman Plaza was sold to new owner ArcWest Partners who proposed to “restore the structure to ‘its historic grandeur’” including some of the historic elements like the façade.

Chapman Plaza continues to be one of the remaining Spanish Revival style architecture in Los Angeles.
