= Adamson House =

Historic house in California, United States

- U.S. National Register of Historic Places
- California Historical Landmark
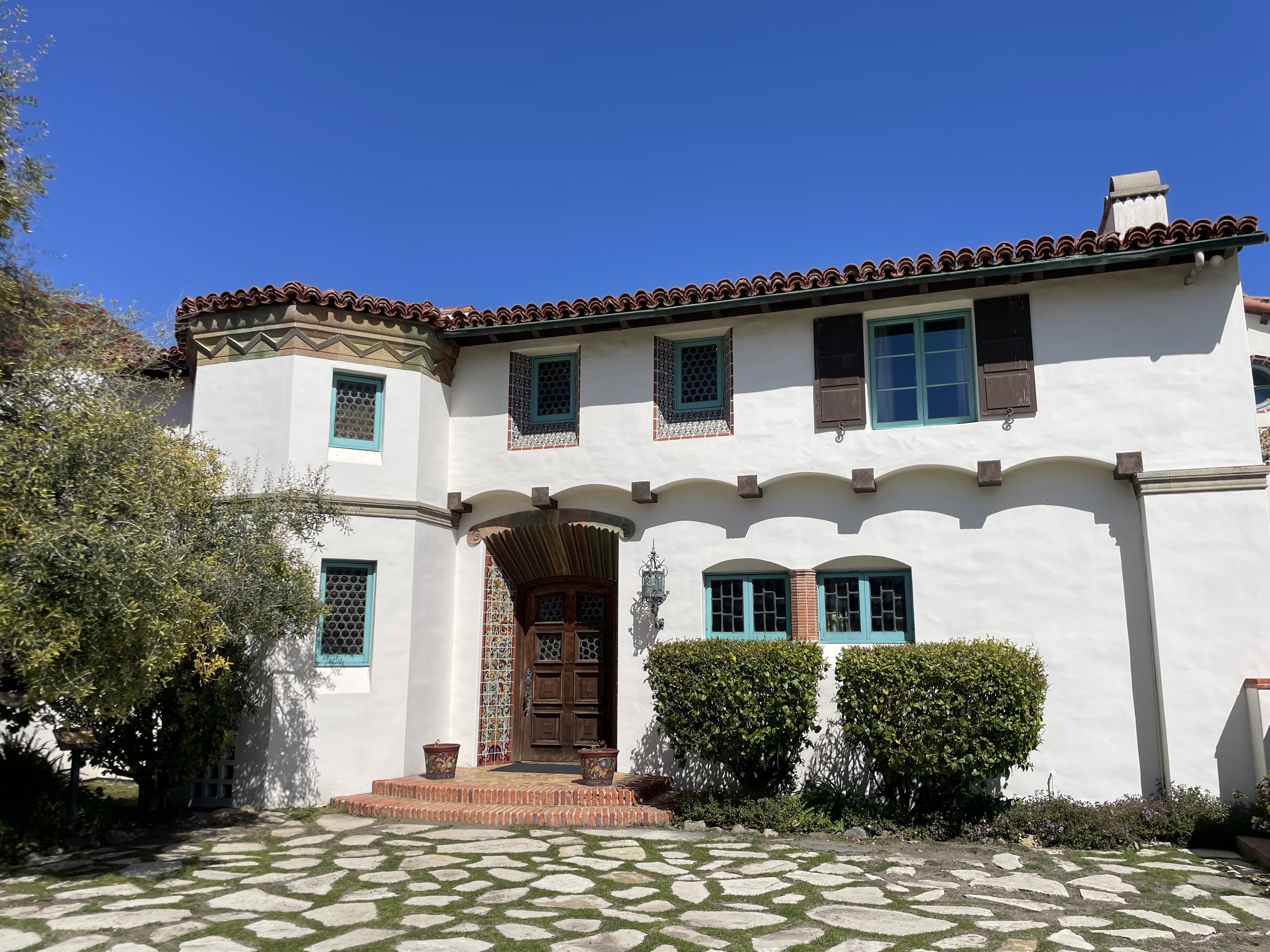
- Adamson House

- Location within the Los Angeles metropolitan area Location within California Location within the United States
- Location: 23200 W. Pacific Coast Highway, Malibu, California
- Coordinates: 34°2′4″N 118°40′42″W
- Built: 1929 (family moved in during June 1930)
- Architect: Stiles O. Clements
- Architectural style: Spanish Colonial Revival or Mediterranean - Moorish
- NRHP reference No.: 77000298
- CHISL No.: 966
- Added to NRHP: October 28, 1977

The Adamson House and its estate, known as Vaquero Hill in the 19th century, is a historic house built by Rhoda Adamson and gardens in Malibu, California. The residence and estate is on the coast, within Malibu Lagoon State Beach park.

It has been called the "Taj Mahal of Tile" due to its extensive use of decorative ceramic tiles designed by Rufus Keeler of Malibu Potteries. The house was built in 1929 for Rhoda Rindge Adamson and Merritt Huntley Adamson, based on a Mediterranean Revival design by Stiles O. Clements of the architectural firm of Morgan, Walls & Clements. The Adamson House was designated as California Historical Landmark No. 966 in 1977, and added to the National Register of Historic Places in 1985.

== History ==
=== Rindge-Adamson family ===
Frederick Hastings Rindge was a wealthy Boston businessman who relocated to Los Angeles, and owned Rindge Ranch, which included the historic Spanish land concession Rancho Topanga Malibu Sequit, and was enlarged by purchasing the surrounding land. Rindge Ranch encompassed present day Malibu, California, and small portions of the Santa Monica Mountains. His daughter was Rhoda Agatha Rindge Adamson.

Merritt Adamson (1888–1949) was a graduate of University of Southern California Law School and captain of the university’s 1912 football team, the first USC team to be known as the "Trojans". Adamson met Rhoda Rindge when he was employed as the foreman of Rindge Ranch. Rhoda Rindge reportedly became interested in him when she helped nurse him back to health after he was injured in an accident. The couple married in 1915. In 1916, Adamson established a dairy business in San Fernando Valley, in Tarzana (known as Adohr Farms); ‘Adohr’ represented his wife's name spelled backwards. The business became one of the country's biggest dairy farms, tending one of the largest herds of Guernsey cows in the world.

=== Construction and architecture ===
The two-story, ten-room Adamson House was designed by Stiles O. Clements. It was built using steel-reinforced concrete. Completed in 1930, Stiles called the house an outstanding example of modified Mediterranean Revival-style architecture. Architectural historians refer to the style as a synthesis of Spanish Colonial Revival and Moorish Revival architecture.

The home’s interior space is boasts red tile floors and ceilings, lancet windows, exposed wood beams, and moulded walls. Other features include teak woodworking, several fireplaces in interior and outdoor patio rooms, hand-painted ceilings, lead-framed bottle-glass windows, and "wrought-iron filigrees fitting over the windows like intricate jewelry." The main floor is dominated by an expansive living room with windows on three sides. It is furnished as it was when the Adamsons lived there, including a large radio on which the family received news of the attack on Pearl Harbor.

Other rooms on the main floor include a guest bedroom; a bathroom with tiled from floor to ceiling; a dining room with an old convent table that overlooks the ocean; a kitchen with an early-model dishwasher and colorfully tiled clock; and the main entrance, equipped with a solid wood door and tiled entrance table. The house also features an elevator system.

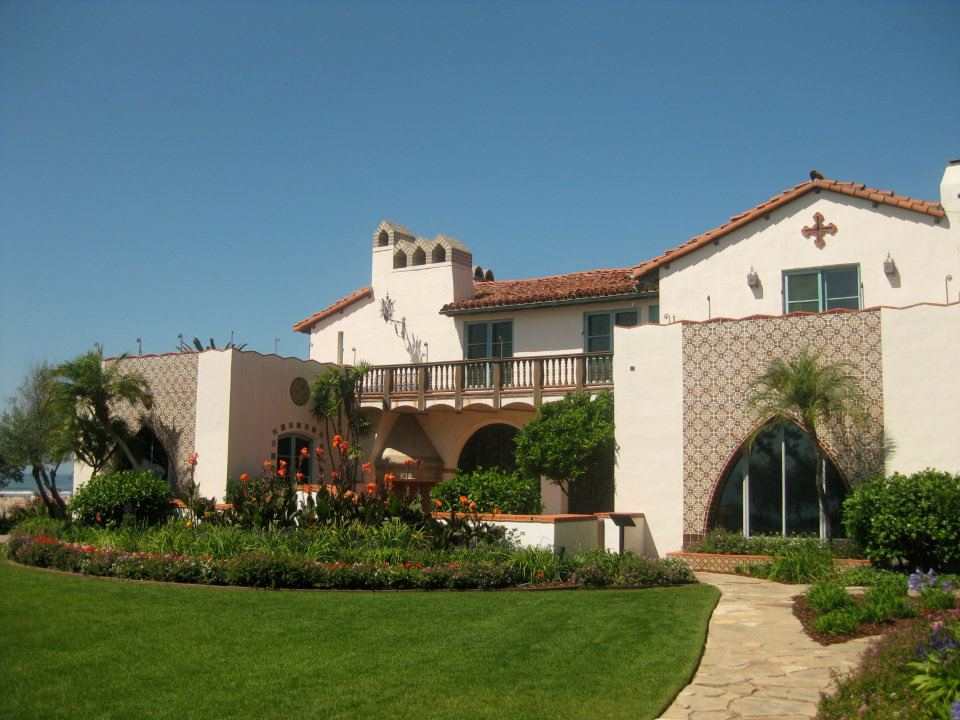
Back view of the house looking west.

The second story has four bedrooms and a small kitchenette. The master bedroom, where Mr. and Mrs. Adamson slept, sits at the southwest corner of the house; it has a large tiled bathroom. Mrs. Adamson's clothes and hat collection remain in the closet. Next to the master bedroom is the one designed for the Adamsons' son; its bathroom has detailed tiles depicting ships and nautical scenes. The girls' bedroom sits in the center, providing a view of the ocean and its coast. The three bedrooms open to a large patio with a panoramic view of the ocean, the Malibu lagoon, and the coast. The fourth bedroom is at the eastern end and overlooks a large Dombeya tree that blooms bright red flowers in the spring.

Another striking feature of the house is the tiled swimming pool set into the sand equipped with a special filtering and heating apparatus that permitted the pool to be filled with either salt or fresh water. In 1930, The Los Angeles Times noted that the unusual features made the "plunge one of the finest in the southland." The pool house features an outdoor fresco of Portuguese explorer Juan Rodriguez Cabrillo.

=== Malibu tile ===
Adamson House is best known for its extensive use of locally produced Malibu tile. In 1926, Rhonda’s mother, May K. Rindge established a tile-work factory east of the Malibu Pier. The factory was run by Rufus Keeler, an innovative ceramic engineer who worked with local artisans to design decorative art tile, employing more than 100 workers in the late 1920s and creating "some of the most colorful and inventive glazed tiles in the country." Hand-crafted art tile fired from local clay was specially designed for each room of the Adamson House. In 1930, the Los Angeles Times reported: "Striking tile effects have been obtained from original designs of the craftsmen and artists of the pottery and floors, walls and patios." Sixty-seven years later, the Los Angeles Times was still writing about the home's extraordinary tilework: "This huge Spanish-style mansion, built in 1929 [sic], might as well be called the house that tile built. Tile is everywhere — from the ceramic wall clock above the tile-topped oak table in the kitchen to the floor-to-ceiling tiled bathrooms."

One of the home's most popular examples of tilework is a 60-foot (18 m) imitation of Persian carpet, including small pieces designed to look like rug fringes. In the exterior of the house, the colorfully tiled Neptune Fountain, Peacock Fountain, and Star Fountain are among the home's most photographed examples. Nearby, there is an elaborately outdoor tub used by the Adamsons to bathe their dogs.

The bathhouse and swimming pool are also covered with Malibu tile, and the dressing rooms have tiled showers with decorative motifs. The house has been called a "museum of tile" and the "Taj Mahal of Tile". The Malibu Potteries only operated for six years from 1926 to 1932, and the Adamson House has many of the pottery’s most significant surviving works.

=== Early use ===
The house was originally a vacation beach cottage, but the Adamsons eventually made it their permanent home. In December 1932, a fire started due to faulty electrical wiring in the garage. One of the bedrooms was badly damaged. The fire was extinguished by pumping crews from the forestry stations at Fernwood and Las Flores, aided by the Malibu Beach colony fire department. During World War II, the bathhouse was used by the United States Coast Guard as a local headquarters to watch over the Malibu coast.

=== Eminent domain and plans for beach parking ===
After the death of her husband, Rhoda Rindge Adamson continued to live in the house until her own death in April 1962. After her death, her heirs announced plans to build a $10–12 million "deluxe Waikiki-type beach resort" on the 13-acre (53,000 m^{2}) site, while preserving the house as an art and history museum. The State of California, however, filed an eminent domain lawsuit in 1966, seeking to raze the house and convert it into beach parking. The state won its eminent domain lawsuit and purchased the property from the Adamson estate for $2.69 million, a valuation set by the court.

=== Preservation as a museum ===
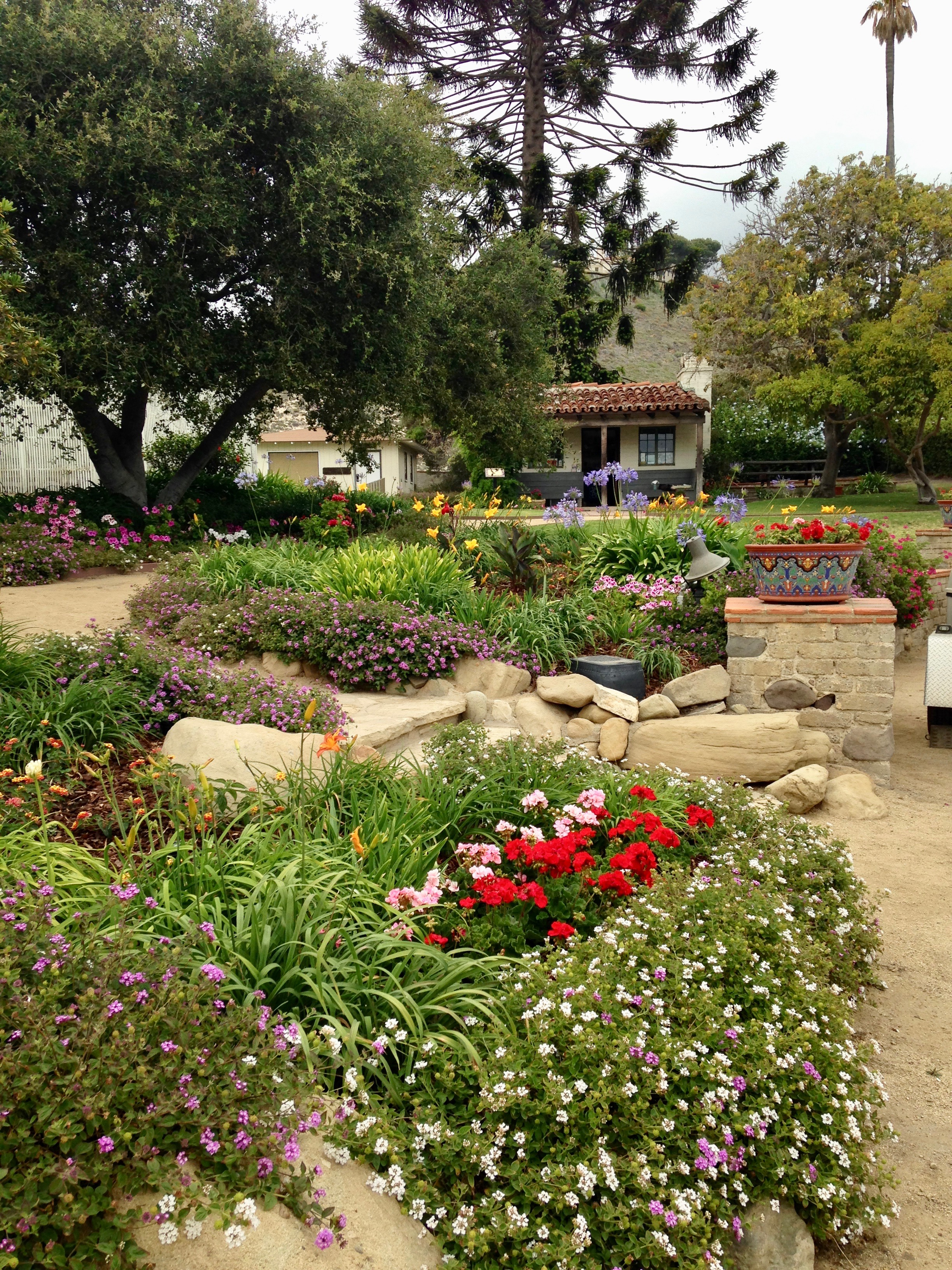
The Adamson House gift shop

Despite the state's eminent domain case victory, the Malibu Historical Society, supported by the Los Angeles County Department of Parks and Recreation and the surviving members of the Adamson family, along with other leading Malibu citizens, fought for the next ten years to preserve the Adamson House. While the state's plans to raze the house were put on hold, the house was leased to Pepperdine University from 1971 to 1982 as the residence of the university's chancellor, Norvel Young.

In addition to its extensive use of Malibu tile, preservationists touted the house as "a prime example of California Moorish-Spanish architecture." In 1976, preservationists won a victory when Herbert Rhodes, the director of the state's Department of Parks and Recreation, overruled staff recommendations to use the land for beach parking and recommended preservation of the entire property. Sylvia Rindge Adamson Neville, granddaughter of Frederick Rindge, donated funds to help restore the house, and additional funding was raised by the Malibu Historical Society. Beginning in October 1982, volunteers from the Malibu Lagoon State Beach Interpretive Association began converting the garage into a small history museum. In 1983, the house and Malibu Lagoon Museum were opened to the public for docent-led tours.

== In pop culture ==
- In 1975, the home was featured in the Mannix episode "A Word Called Courage".
- From 1987 through 1989, the home was featured in seasons eight and ten of Knots Landing, serving as Abby Ewing's house.
- In 2020, the Adamson House was featured in the Netflix show Ratched.
- In 1985, the home was featured in season 8 of Dallas (“Deeds and Misdeeds").
- In 1986, the house is featured as a party house in the season 3 of Airwolf (“Hawke’s Run”).
- The home was featured in a season 1 episode of Charlie's Angels ("The Mexican Connection").

== Historic designations ==
In October 1977, the house was listed on the National Register of Historic Places. In November 1985, it was designated as a California Historical Landmark by the California Historic Resources Commission.

The California Historical Landmark Marker No. 966 at the site reads: NO. 966 ADAMSON HOUSE AT MALIBU LAGOON STATE BEACH - Designed by Stiles O. Clements in 1929, this Spanish Colonial Revival home contains the best surviving examples of decorative ceramic tile produced by Malibu Potteries. During its short existence from 1926 to 1932, Malibu Potteries made an outstanding contribution to ceramic art in California through its development and production of a wide range of artistic and colorful decorative tile. The home was built for Merritt Huntley Adamson and Rhoda Rindge Adamson, daughter of Frederick Hastings Rindge and May Knight Rindge, last owners of the Rancho Malibu Spanish grant.

== Gallery ==
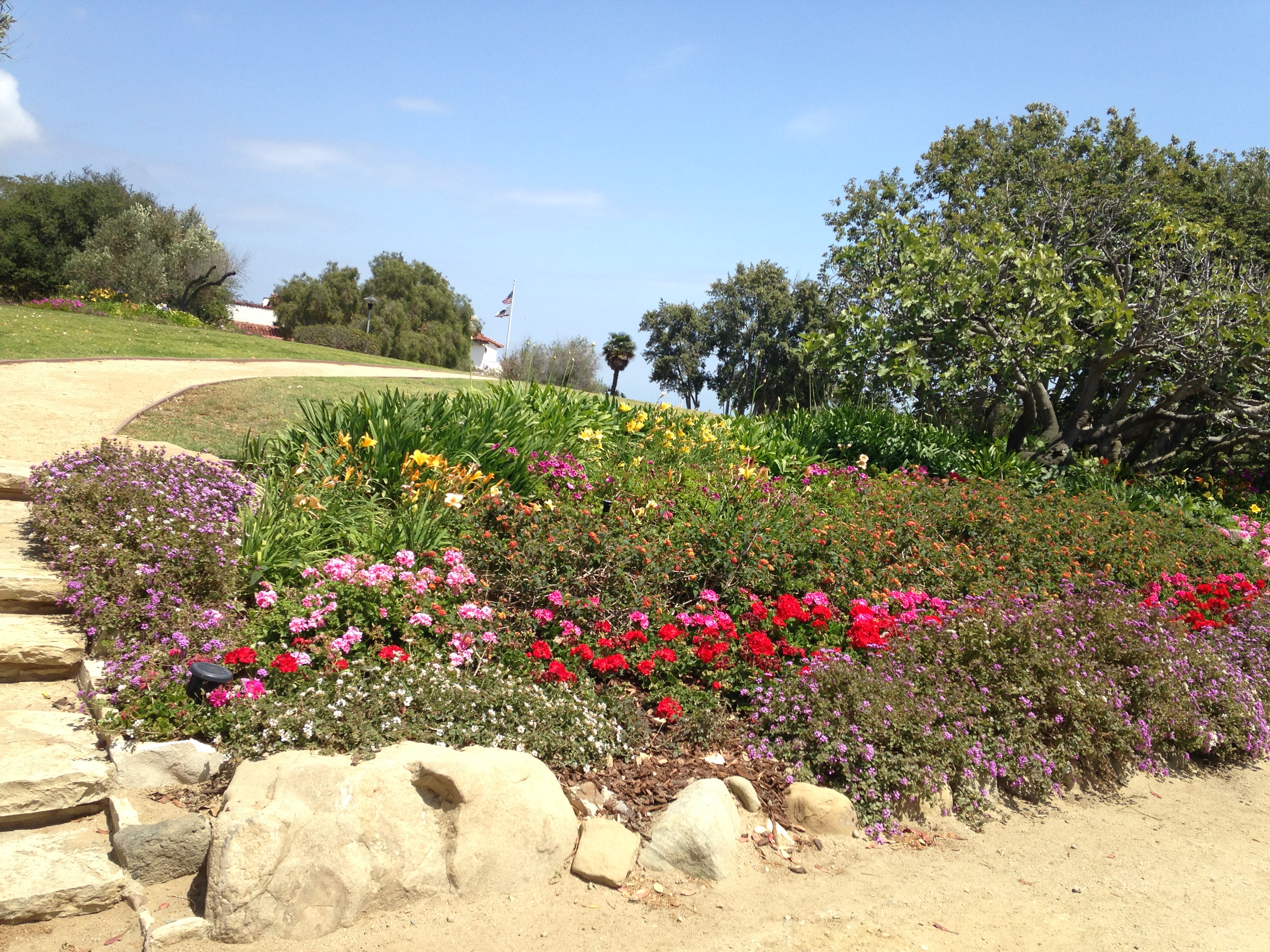
Gardens

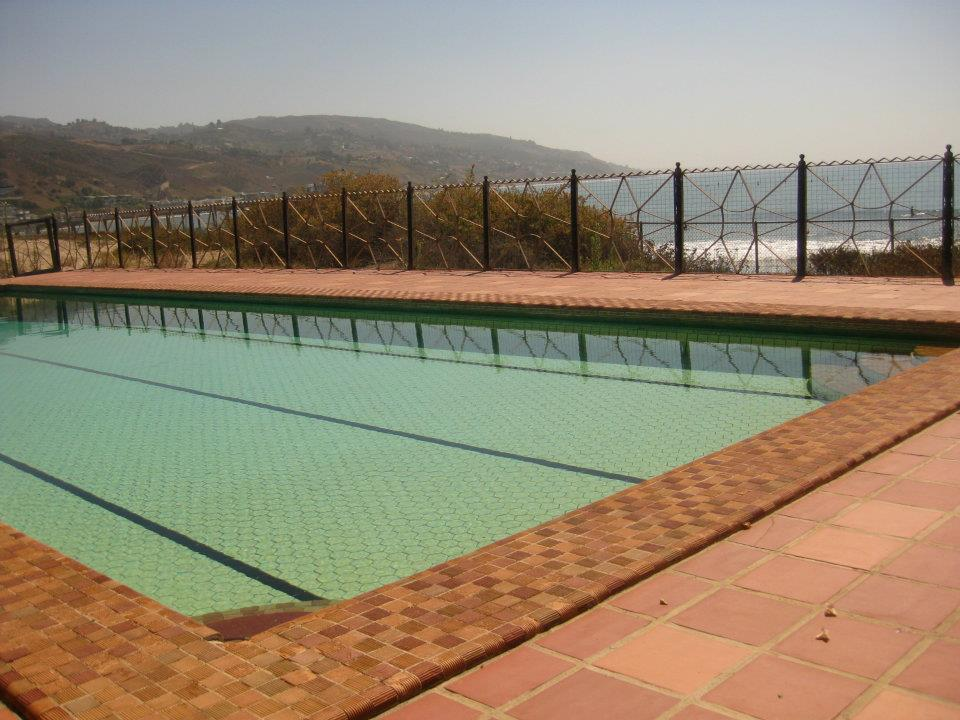
Pool

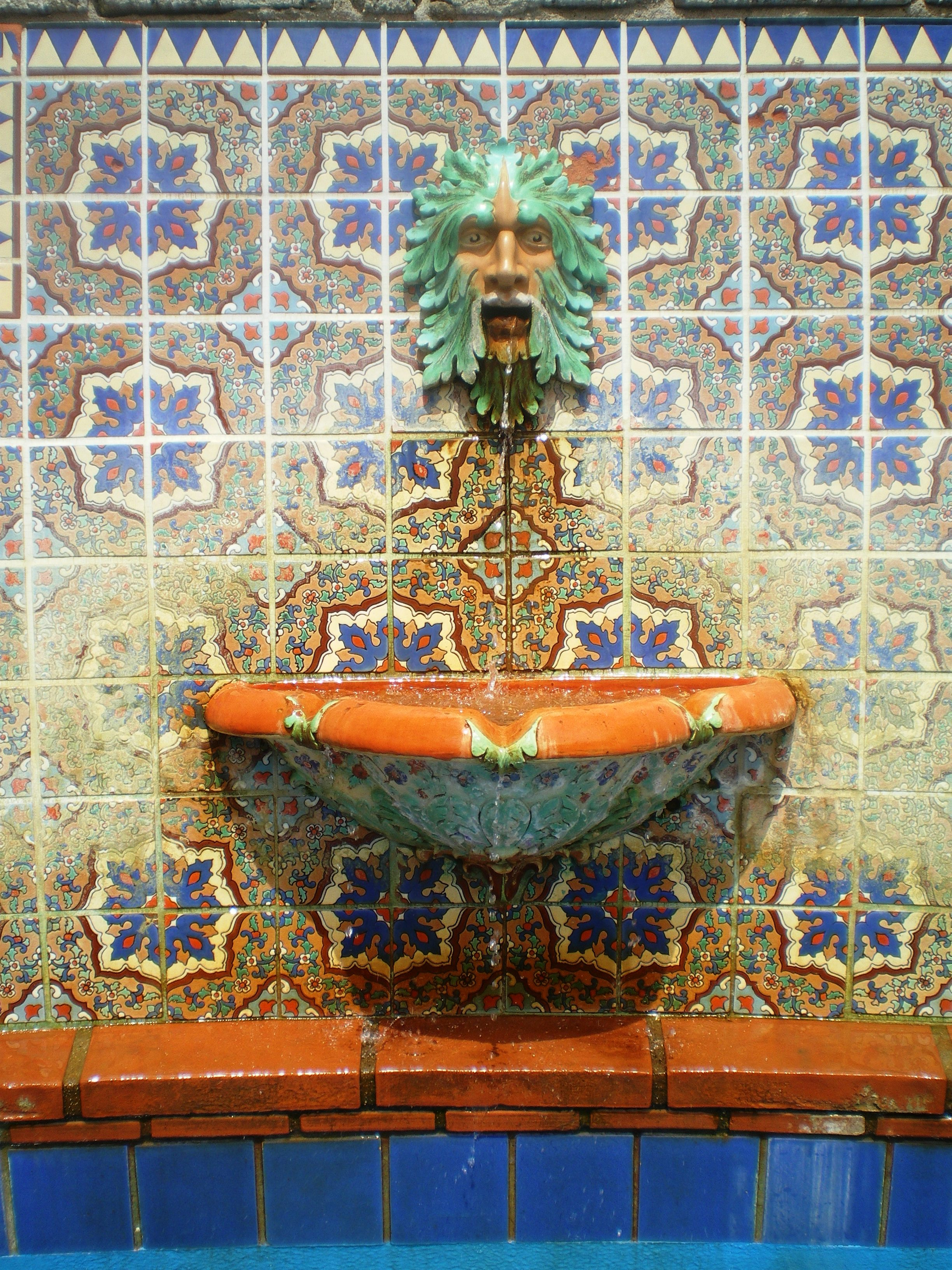
Neptune Fountain

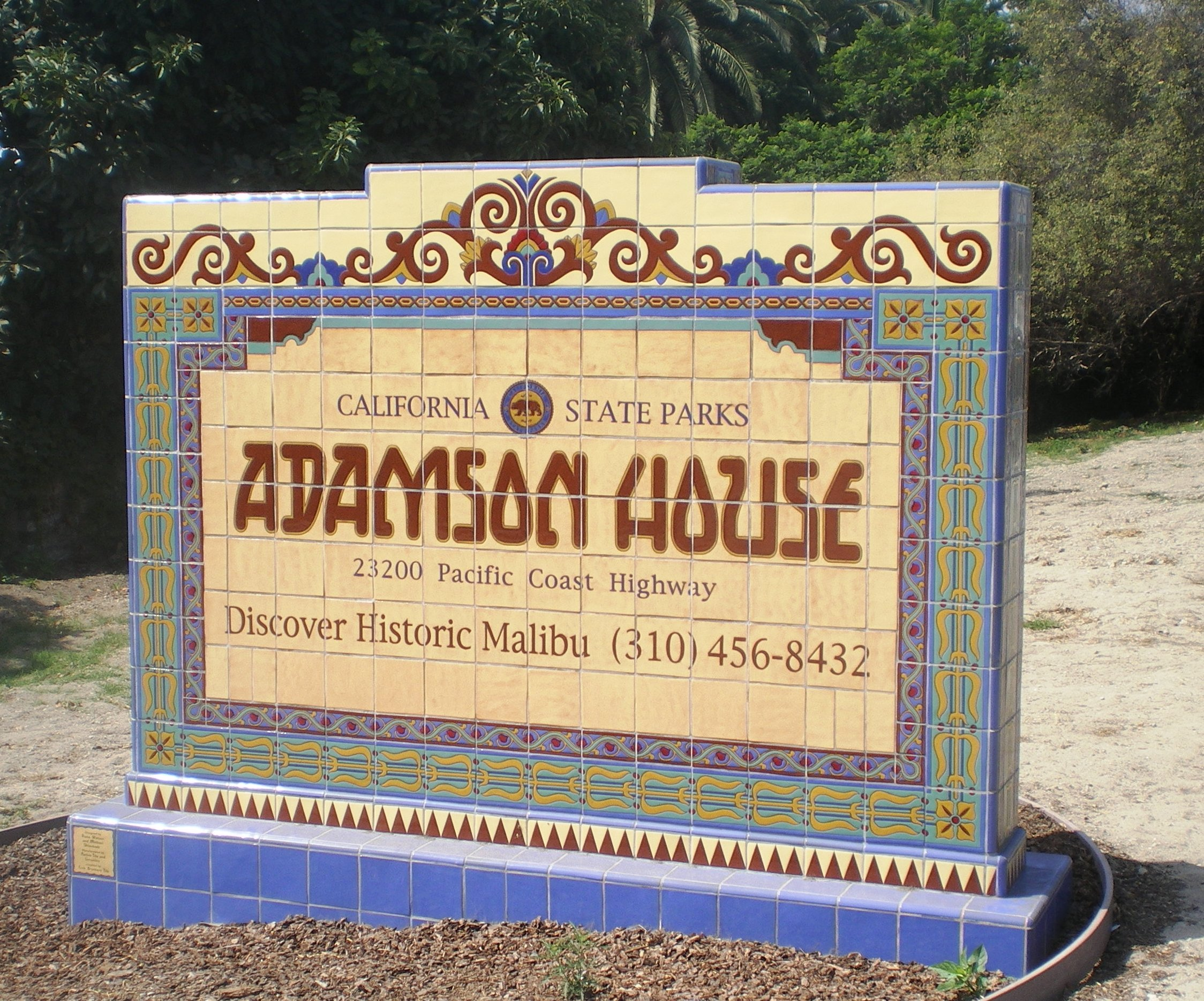
Sign near entrance

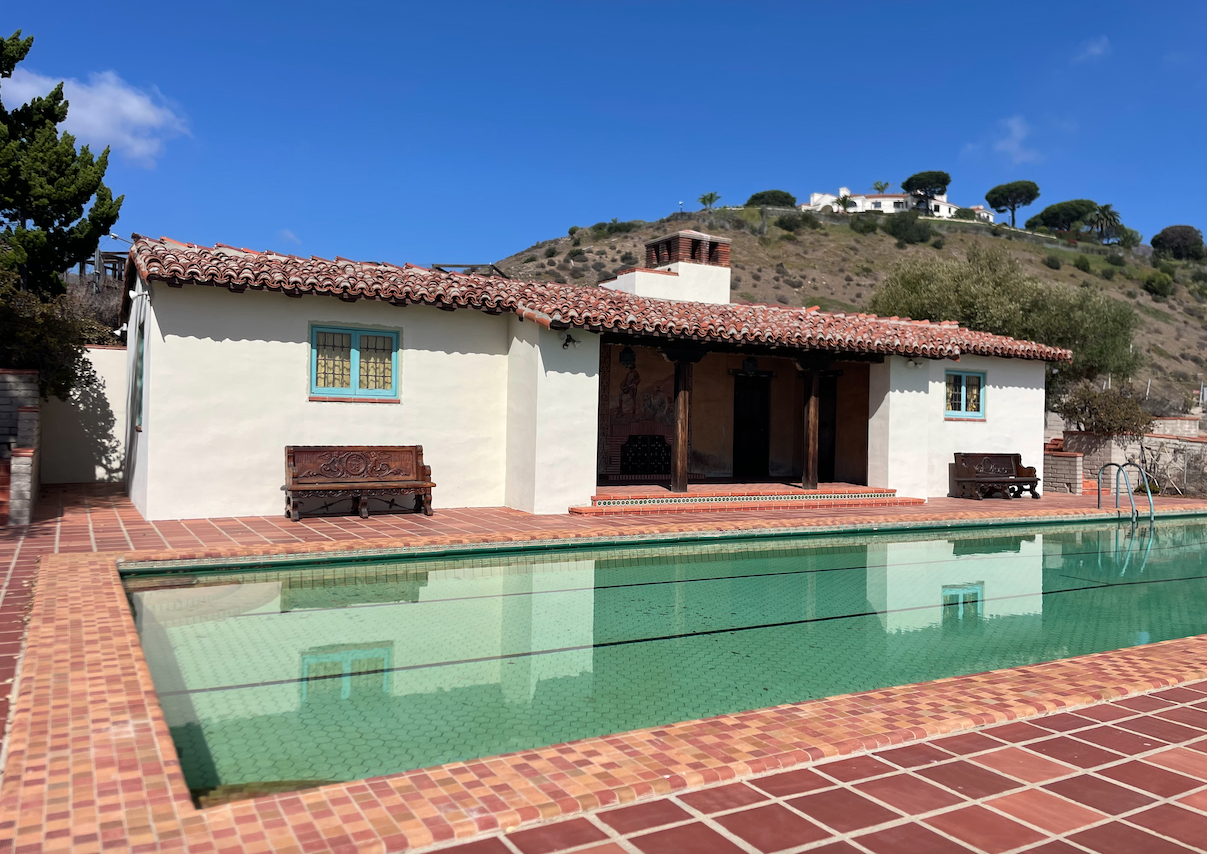
Bathhouse

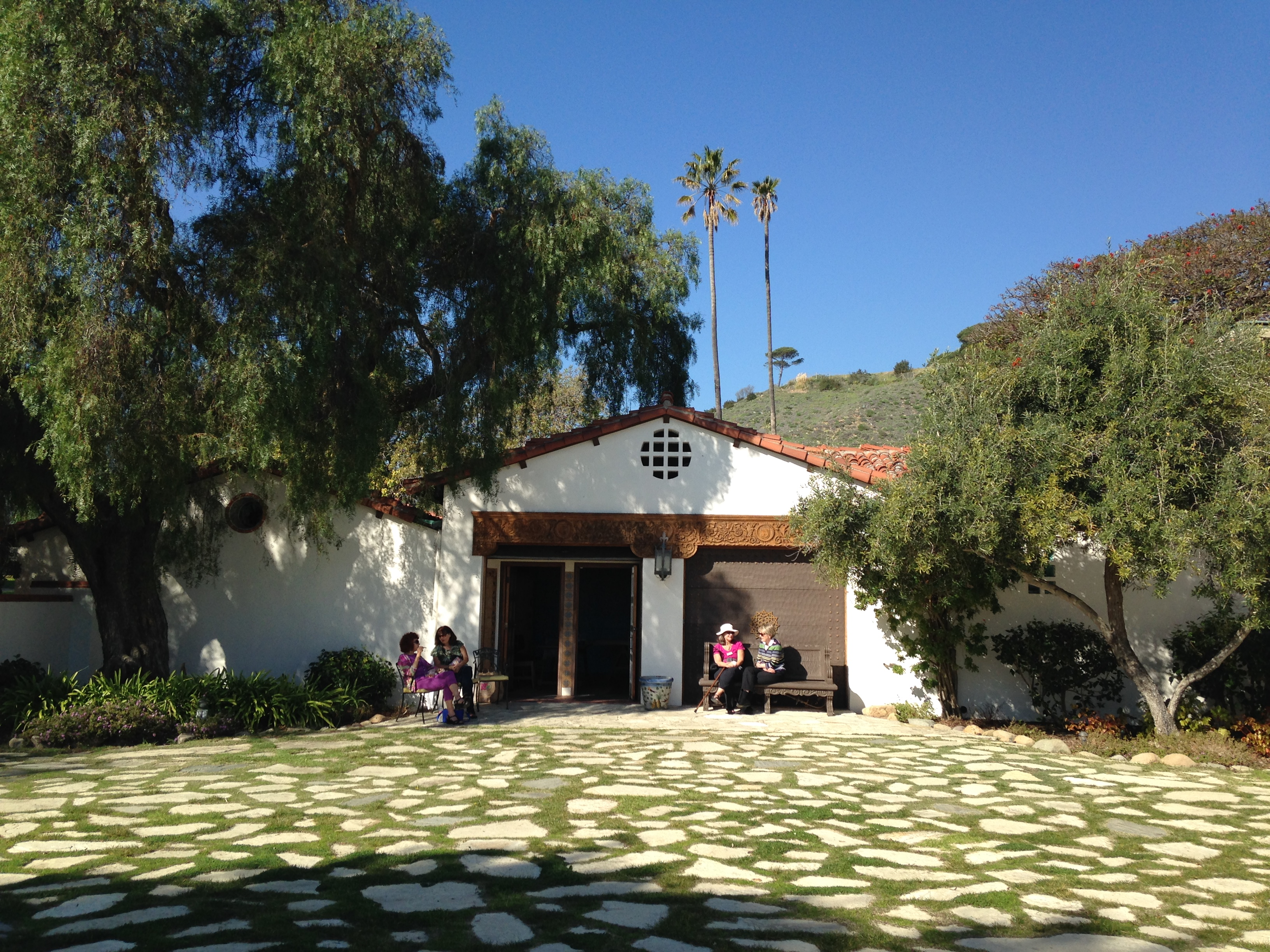
Garage doors, currently the entrance

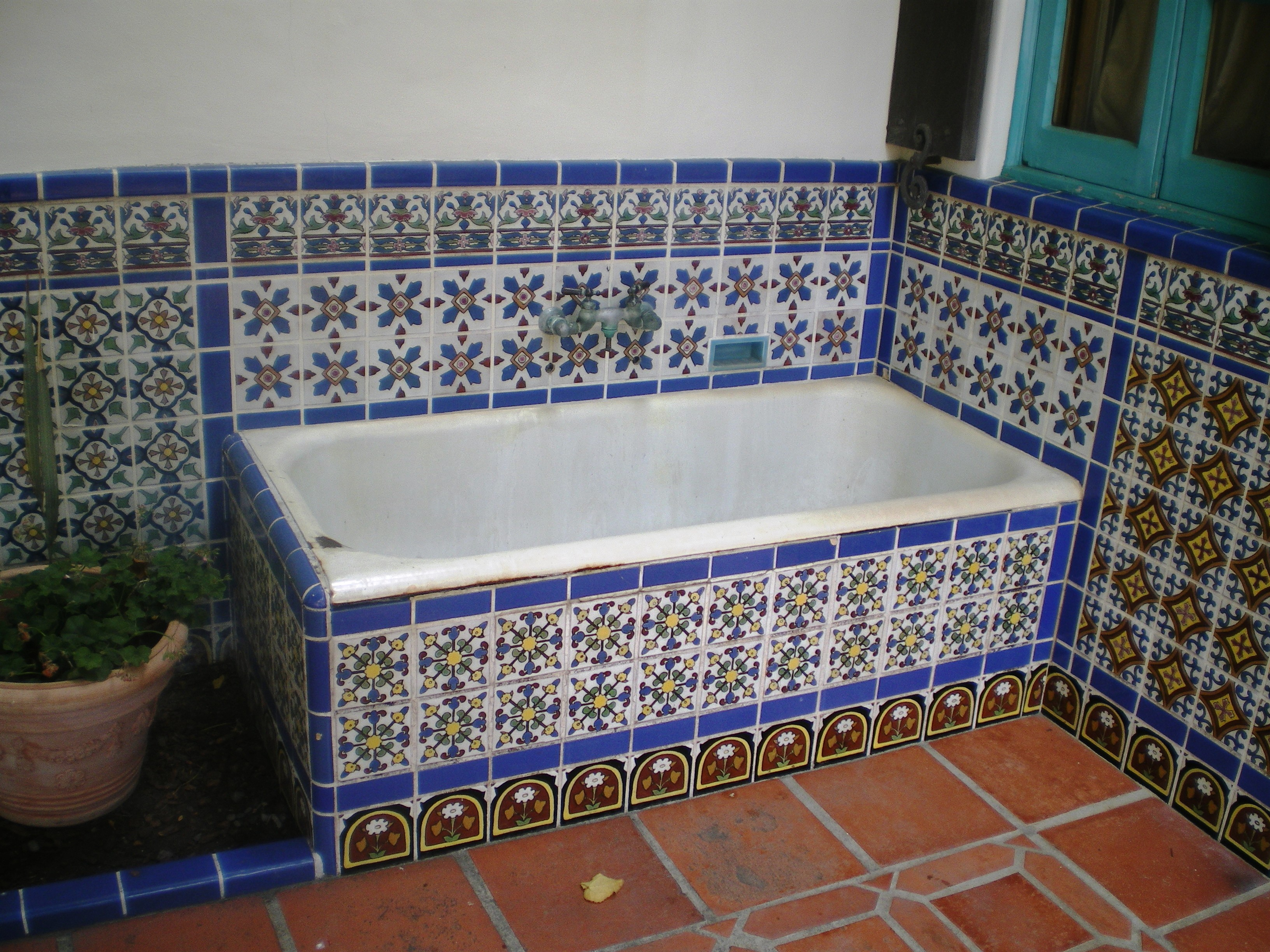
Dog bath

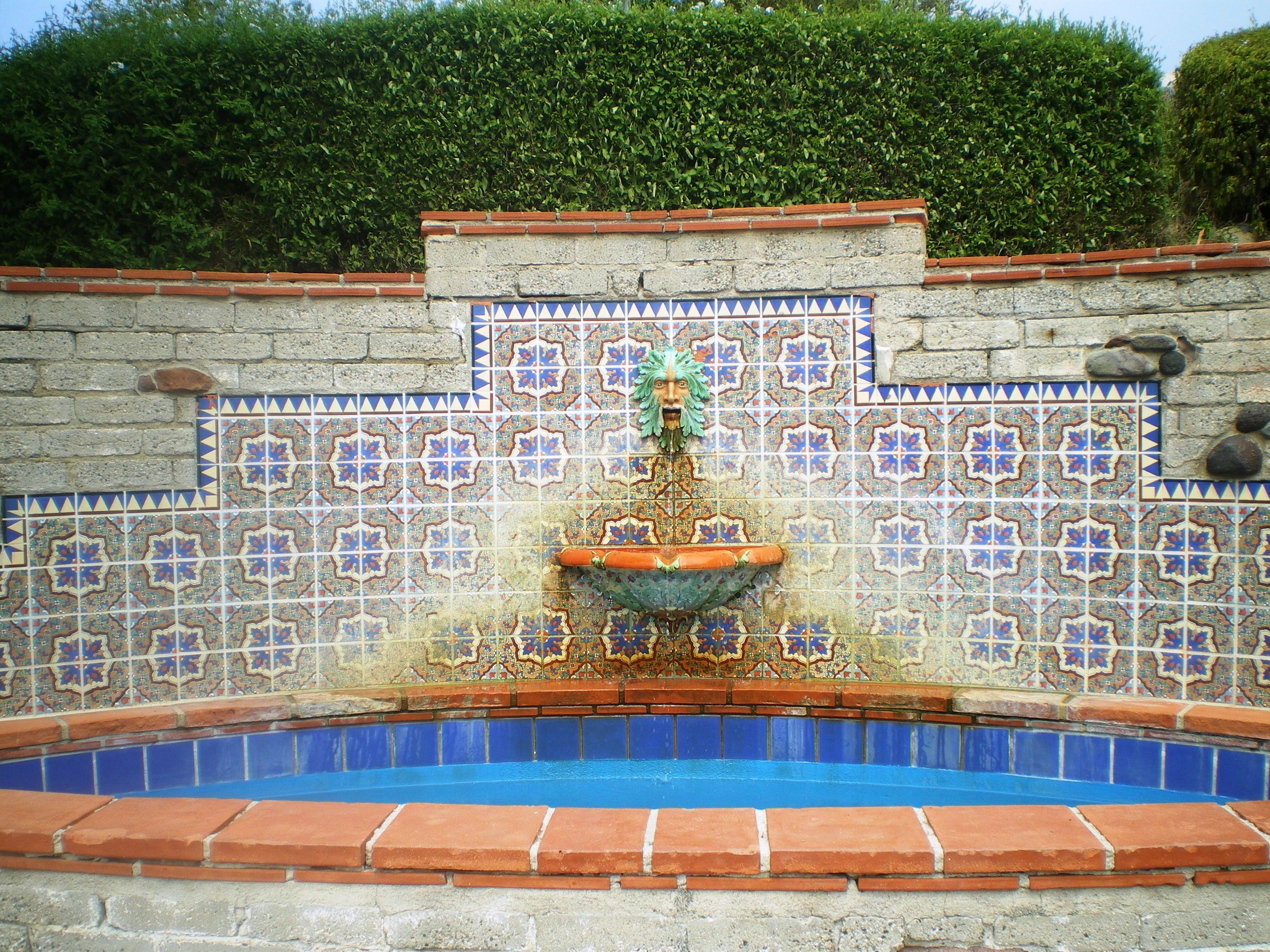
Neptune Fountain

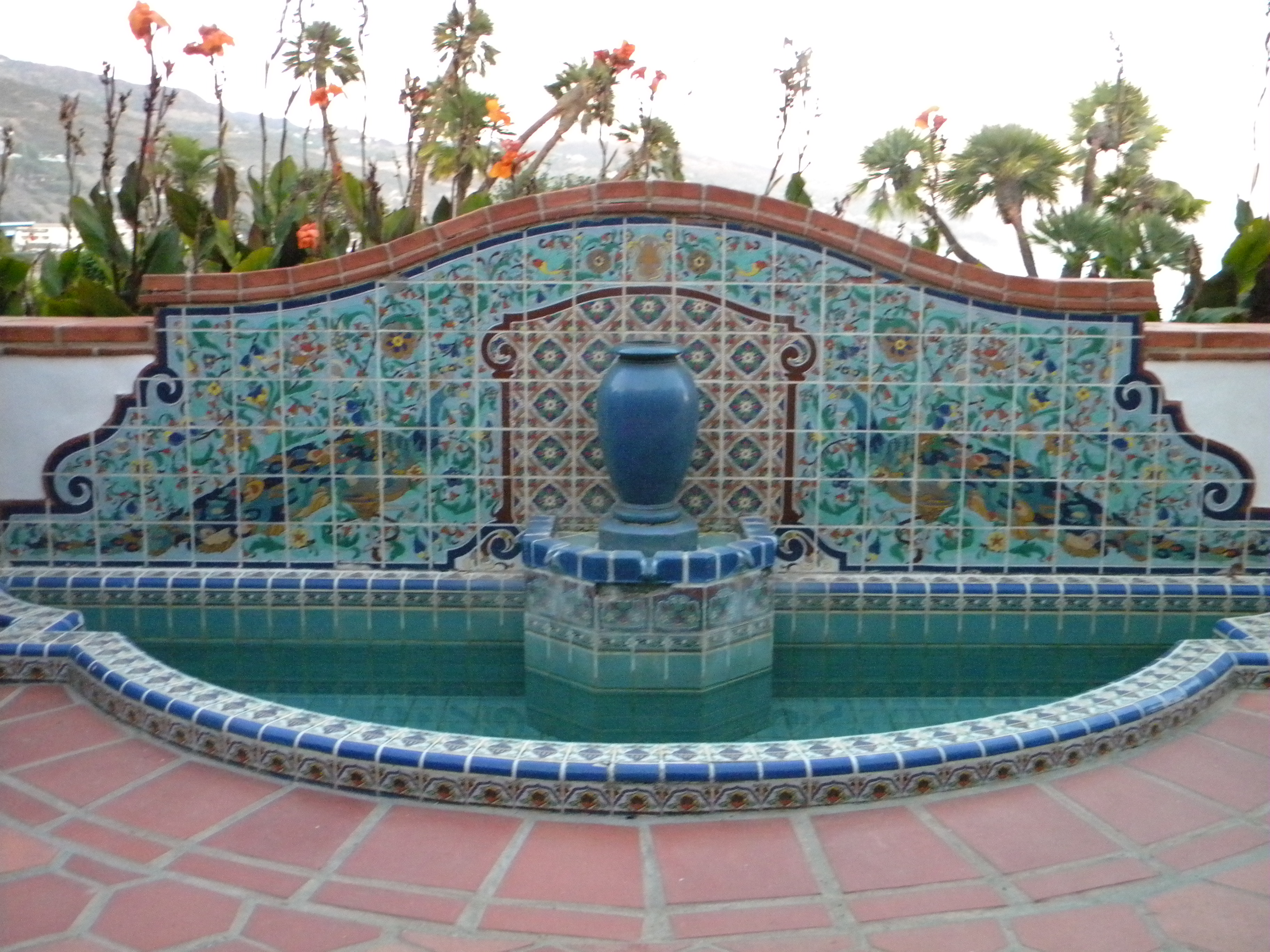
Peacock Fountain

Beachside Fountain

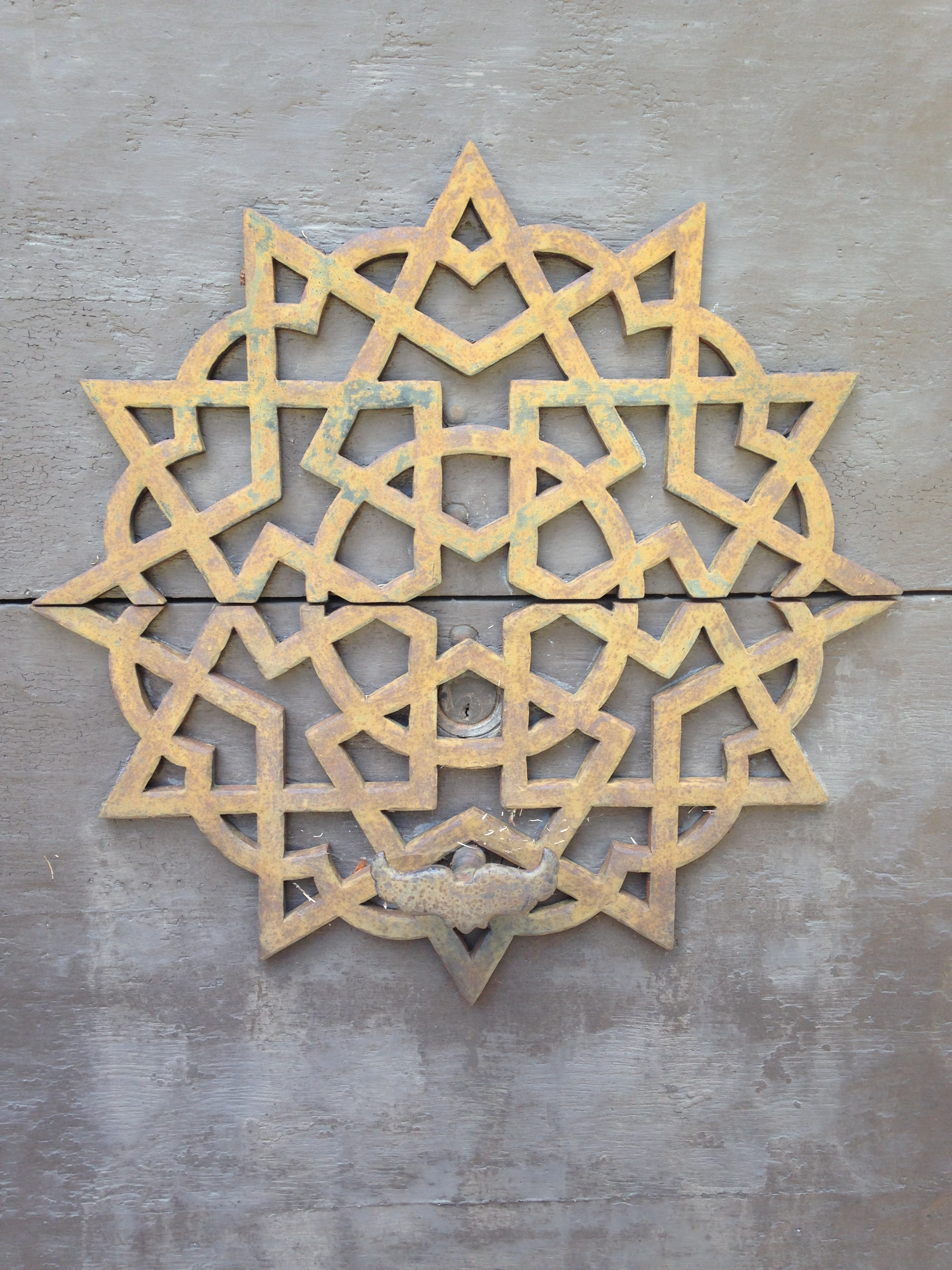
A Moorish detail on the Adamson House garage doors

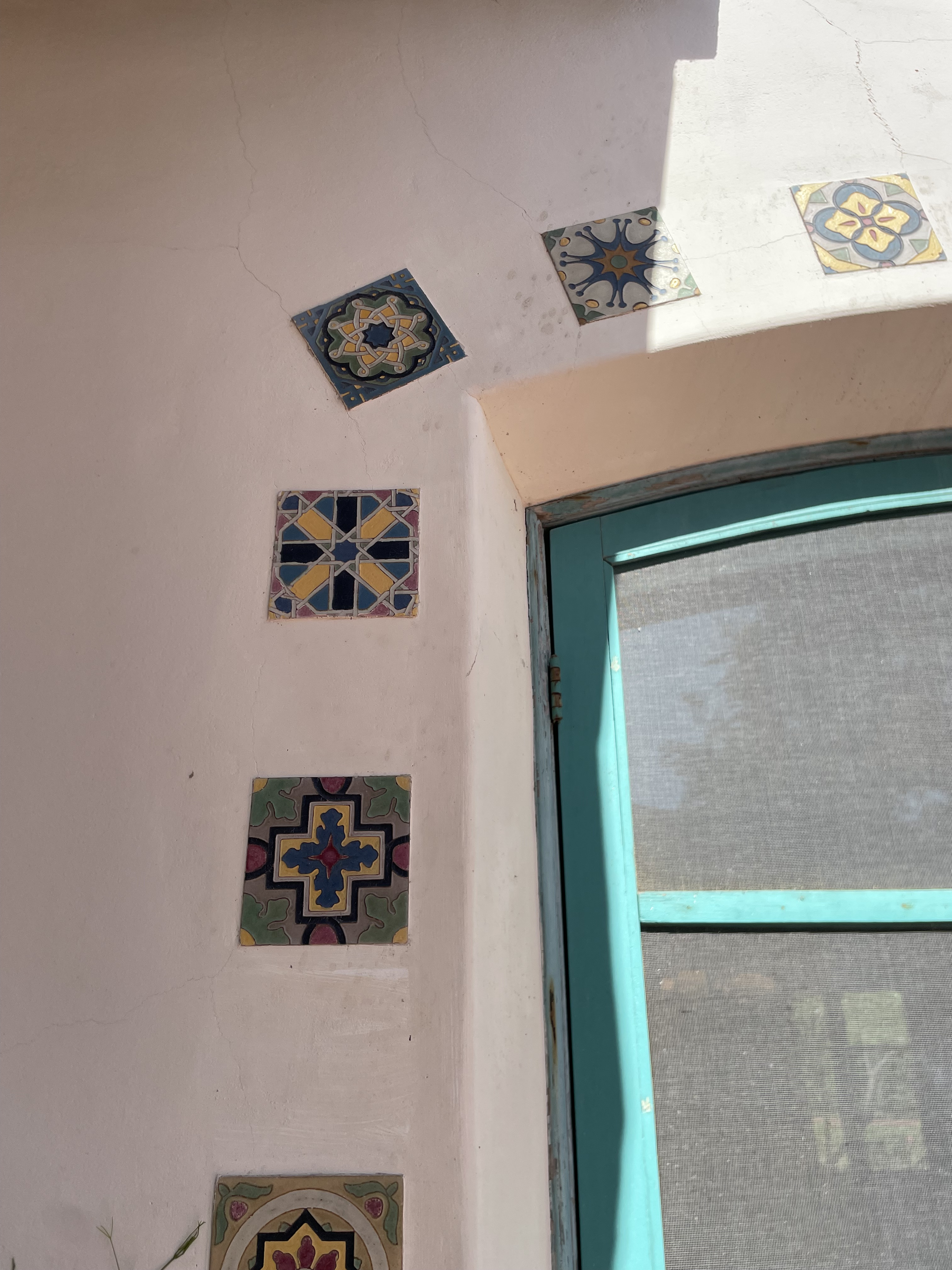
Dining room window (tile frame)

== See also ==
- Malibu Creek
- Rindge Dam
- Rancho Topanga Malibu Sequit
- Frederick Hastings Rindge House
- Frederick Roehrig
- List of Registered Historic Places in Los Angeles County, California
- History of the National Register of Historic Places
- Hueneme, Malibu and Port Los Angeles Railway (The railroad that the Rindges built through Malibu)
