= Dominguez–Wilshire Building =

Building in Los Angeles, California, United States

Coordinates: 34.0621°N 118.3467°W

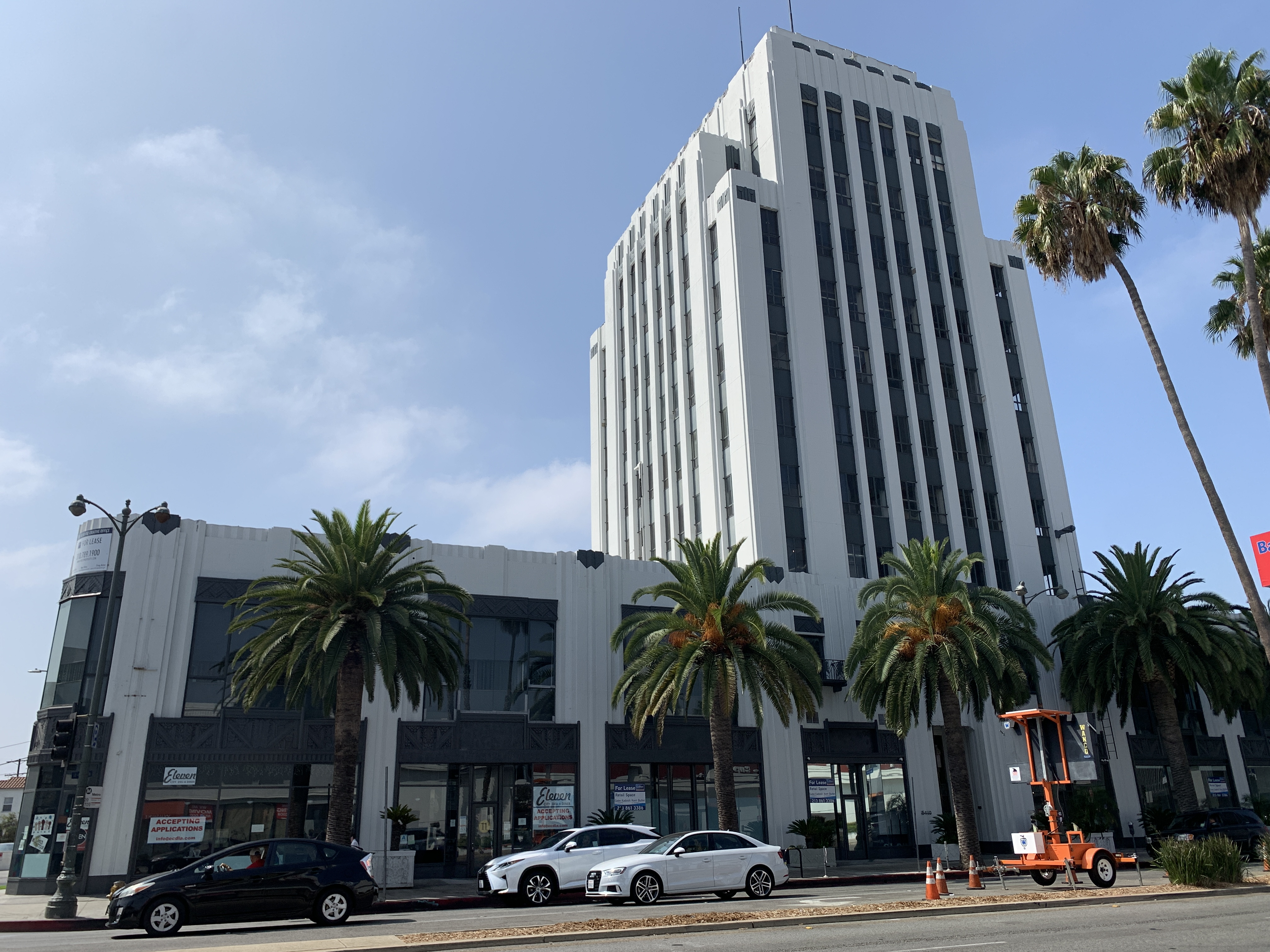
Dominguez–Wilshire Building

The Dominguez–Wilshire Building is located at 5410 Wilshire Boulevard in the Miracle Mile district of Los Angeles, an Art Deco landmark. The architects were Morgan, Walls & Clements. The building was renovated in 2000.

The property was named after its developers, the Dominguez family, the heirs to the first land grant given in California by King Carlos III of Spain.
