= Skirball =

Skirball may refer to:

== People ==
- Jack H. Skirball (1896–1985), American film producer
- Audrey Skirball-Kenis (1914–2002), American philanthropist

== Other uses ==
- Skirball Center for the Performing Arts, theater in New York
- Skirball Cultural Center, Jewish educational institution in California
- Skirball Fire, wildfire
