= Restoring Tomorrow =

- Directed by: Aaron Wolf
- Written by: Aaron Wolf
- Produced by: Timothy Nuttall
- Starring: Archive footage: Alfred Wolf (rabbi); Interviews: Rabbi Steve Leder; Brenda Levin; Dan Wolf
- Narrated by: Aaron Wolf
- Cinematography: Timothy Nuttall; Aashish Gandhi
- Edited by: Simon Carmody
- Music by: Conor Jones
- Production company: Howling Wolf Productions
- Distributed by: 7th Art Releasing
- Release date: April 21, 2017 (Fort Myers Beach)
- Running time: 82 minutes
- Country: United States
- Language: English

Restoring Tomorrow is a 2017 documentary film directed by Aaron Wolf that recounts the history and the restoration of the Wilshire Boulevard Temple in Los Angeles, California.

== Synopsis ==
The film follows filmmaker Aaron Wolf's personal journey of rediscovery, guided by the narration of Wilshire Boulevard Temple's history and reconstruction. At the time that Wolf was studying at New York University, he had little connection to his faith. He considered himself a “fallen-away Jew” and had drifted from the temple and his Jewish faith like much of the nation's younger generations. Weeks before their wedding, Wolf and his fiancé split, sending him back to his childhood temple to seek counsel from Rabbi Steve Leder. It was then that Rabbi Leder shared his vision to renovate the temple, which at that point was in total disrepair and falling apart. Rabbi Leder asked Wolf to document the temple's restoration, and Wolf agreed to bring on his production company, Howling Wolf Productions, to film the process.

Intertwined in the story of the temple's restoration is the temple's history as the first Jewish congregation in Los Angeles, California, told chronologically through the various rabbis that have led the congregations, including Edgar Magnin and Harvey J. Fields. Most consequential for the film and its filmmaker is Alfred Wolf, Aaron's grandfather who had left Eberbach, Germany at the time that the Nazis rose to power and served as rabbi at Wilshire Boulevard Temple from 1949 to 1985. It is likely Rabbi Wolf's influence on the temple and the community that draws Wolf closer to the subject of the film, the temple and ultimately his faith.

== Cast ==
- Aaron Wolf
- Rabbi Steve Leder
- George Alvarez
- Bob Bookman
- Lionel Bell
- Steve Breur
- Marian Brown
- Stephen Davis
- Ryan Kavanaugh
- Stephen Sass
- Karen Wilson
- Dan Wolf
- Joyce Powell
- Don Schwarz
- Louise Taubman
- Bishop Kenneth C. Ulmer

== Awards and nominations ==
Restoring Tomorrow was awarded Best Documentary at the 2017 Myrtle Beach Film Festival. The Los Angeles Jewish Film Festival hosted a special screening of the film on closing night on May 3, 2017, honoring famed LA architect Brenda Levin for her work in renovating and reconstructing the temple. Director Aaron Wolf and Rabbi Steve Leder attended and participated in a Q&A following the screening.
