= Aaron Wolf (director) =

American actor, director and filmmaker

- Citizenship: American
- Occupations: Director, writer, actor
- Known for: Restoring Tomorrow (2017); Tar (2020)
- Website: www.howlingwolfproductions.com

Aaron Wolf is an American actor, writer and director. He directed the documentary film Restoring Tomorrow (2017), about the resoration of Wilshire Boulevard Temple, a synagogue in Los Angeles, California. Wolf also co-wrote, directed and appeared in the horror film Tar (2020).

== Education ==
Wolf attended New York University. He then studied acting and improv with The Groundlings.

== Career ==
In 2012, Wolf wrote the film Guest House starring Michael Gross, Heather Lind and Mark Gessner. The film is based around real events in Wolf's life, and premiered at the HollyShorts Film Festival. In 2014, Wolf's production company, Howling Wolf Productions, produced The Quitter, an indie drama about a former baseball player who attempts to rebuild his relationship with his daughter. In 2014, Wolf wrote, directed and co-starred in The Walk alongside Peter Riegert. The film was adapted from an anecdote written in Rabbi David Wolpe's book "Why Faith Matters."

In 2016, Wolf directed Restoring Tomorrow, a documentary about the history and restoration of Wilshire Boulevard Temple, where his grandfather Rabbi Alfred Wolf served for 50 years. The temple was built in 1929 and was designed in part by designers from Metro-Goldwyn-Mayer, Universal Pictures and Warner Bros. The documentary included archival footage and interviews with public figures examining the restoration project that was completed in 2013. The film premiered at the Los Angeles Jewish Film Festival on 3 May 2017. It was later acquired by 7th Art Releasing for sales and distribution.

In 2020, Wolf later co-wrote and directed horror film TAR, set around the La Brea Tar Pits in Los Angeles.
