= Geffen Playhouse =

American non-profit theatre company

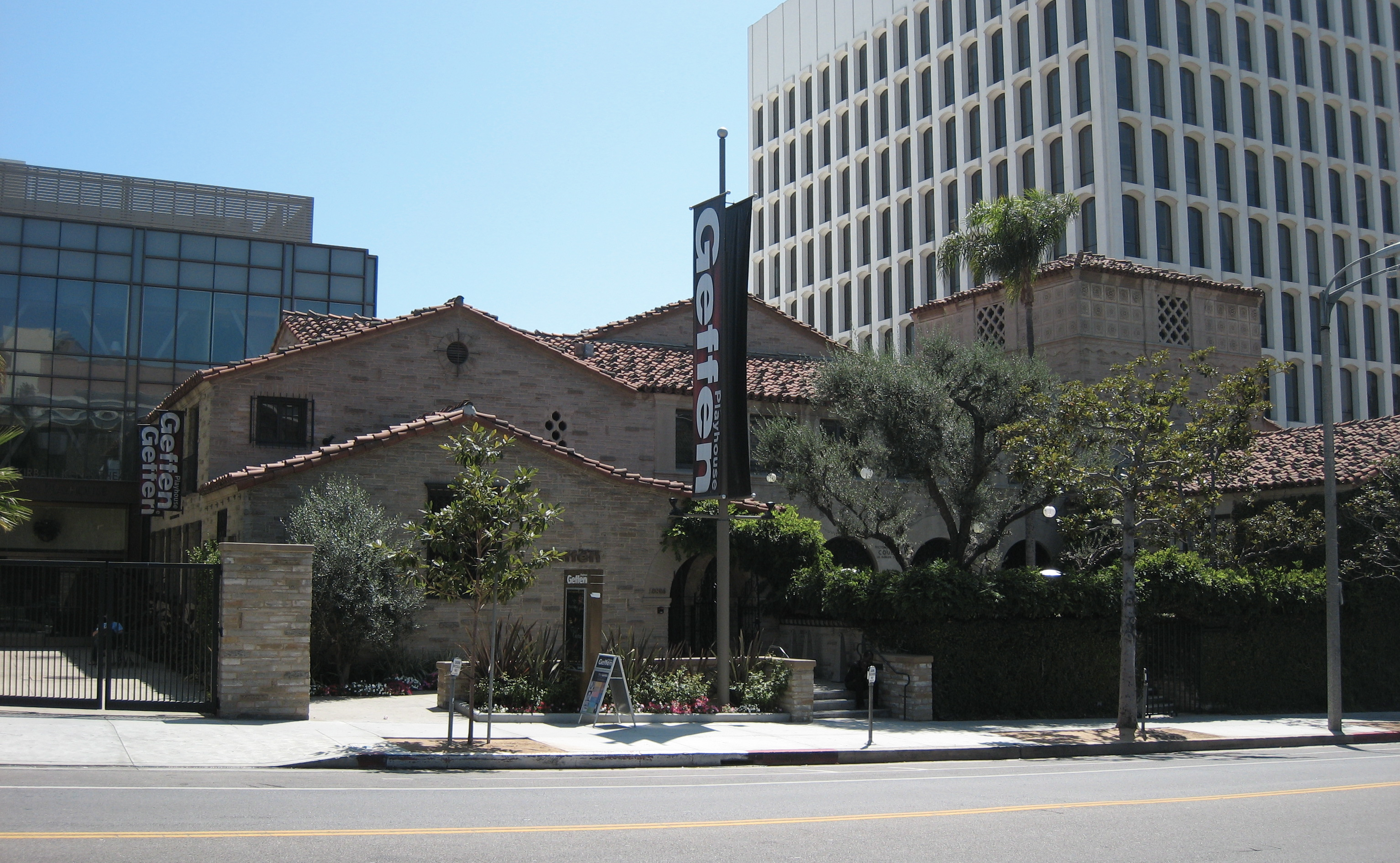
- Interactive map of Geffen Playhouse
- Address: 10886 Le Conte Avenue; Los Angeles, California; United States
- Coordinates: 34.0636°N 118.4447°W
- Owner: UCLA School of Theater, Film and Television
- Operator: Geffen Playhouse Inc.
- Capacity: Gil Cates Theater: 512; Audrey Skirball Kenis Theatre:149
- Type: Regional theater

Construction
- Built: 1929
- Opened: 1970s
- Reopened: 1995
- Rebuilt: 2005

Website
- geffenplayhouse.com

The Geffen Playhouse is a not-for-profit theater company founded in Los Angeles, California by Gilbert Cates in 1995.

It produces plays in two theaters in Geffen Playhouse, which is owned by University of California Los Angeles. The Playhouse is located in the Westwood neighborhood of Los Angeles, California. It was named for donor David Geffen. The current executive director is Gil Cates Jr.

== Venues, performances ==
The Geffen Playhouse offers five plays per season in the Gil Cates Theatre and three plays per season in the Audrey Skirball Kenis Theatre, as well as producing special events in both venues.

== History ==
The Geffen Playhouse was built in 1929 as the Masonic Affiliates Club, or the MAC, for students and alumni at UCLA. One of the first twelve structures built in Westwood Village, it was designed by architect Stiles O. Clements.

Its courtyard fountain is a piece from Malibu Potteries. The pattern on the lower tier of the Geffen's fountain appears in the Adamson House dining room, while the pattern on the upper tier can be seen on the west exterior face of the dining room, bordering a Moorish arch window.

Originally named the Contempo Theatre, and later the Westwood Playhouse, the property was purchased by UCLA in 1994. UCLA's then-chancellor, Charles E. Young, appointed Gil Cates, founder and former president of the UCLA School of Theater, Film and Television, as its producing director.

The theater was renamed in 1995 after media mogul David Geffen donated $5 million. In 2002, the David Geffen Foundation made a $5-million lead gift towards an eventual $17-million capital campaign to renovate the theater. The Geffen reopened on November 16, 2005, with the main 500-seat theater retained and named the Geffen Theater, to distinguish it from the new, 125-seat Audrey Skirball-Kenis Theater added during the renovation.

In March 2010, the Playhouse's board of directors changed the name of the Geffen Theater to the Gil Cates Theater. Cates died in October 2011. Gil Cates Jr. was appointed executive director in 2015.

Matt Shakman was appointed artistic director in August 2017, followed by Tarell Alvin McCraney in September 2023.
