= Herscher (surname) =

Herscher is a German-language surname. Notable people with this surname include:

- Jeanne Herscher-Clément (1878 - 1941), French pianist and composer
- Joseph Herscher, YouTube personality known for his channel Joseph's Machines
- Penny Herscher an American executive in electronic design automation industry, formerly with Cadence Design Systems
- Uri D. Herscher (born 1941), American rabbi and academic

== See also ==
- Herrscher (disambiguation)
