= Sydney M. Irmas =

American lawyer

- Born: July 27, 1925; Los Angeles, California, US
- Died: August 29, 1996 (aged 71); Los Angeles, California, US
- Education: University of California, Los Angeles; USC Gould School of Law
- Occupations: Attorney, investor, philanthropist, art collector
- Spouse: Audrey Irmas
- Children: Robert Irmas; Matthew Irmas; Deborah Irmas

Sydney M. Irmas (July 27, 1925 – August 29, 1996) was an American attorney, investor, philanthropist and art collector.

== Early life ==
Sydney M. Irmas was born on July 27, 1925, in Los Angeles, California. His father, Sydney M. Irmas Sr., was the founder and Chairman of Slavick Jewelry Co. He had a brother, Richard Irmas, and a sister, Jon Lappen. His ancestors settled on Santa Catalina Island in the 1880s. His mother graduated from the University of Southern California in 1917.

Irmas graduated from the University of California, Los Angeles (UCLA) and received a law degree from the USC Gould School of Law in 1955.

== Career ==
Irmas was an attorney and an investor. Shortly after graduation, he co-founded a law practice with attorney William Rutter until 1975. He practised the law for ten more years at Irmas, Simsky, Chudos, Green, Lasher & Hecht until 1985. He represented the comedian Lenny Bruce, the heiress Patty Hearst, and attorney Melvin Belli.

== Philanthropy ==
Irmas served on the committee of the Los Angeles Family Housing Corporation, which provides housing for the homeless in Los Angeles. He also made charitable gifts to the Hollywood Sunset Free Clinic, which provided free healthcare to the homeless. Additionally, the Sydney M. Irmas Transitional Living Center in North Hollywood, through the LA Family Housing, is named in his honor. It offers 260 beds for up to 24 months to families who are temporarily homeless.

Irmas endowed programs for underprivileged youths in South Central and Canoga Park.

== Art collection ==
With his wife, he was a collector of modern art. Their collection included photographs by Alphonse Louis Poitevin, Berenice Abbott, Piet Zwart, Peter Keetman, Robert Mapplethorpe, Andy Warhol, Lee Friedlander, Edward Steichen, Cindy Sherman, Yasumasa Morimura, Claude Cahun, Pierre Molinier, Roger Fenton, Francis Frith, etc. In 1992, they donated most of their collection to the Los Angeles County Museum of Art.

An exhibition of 140 of their donated works entitled The Camera I: Photographic Self-Portraits From the Audrey and Sydney Irmas Collection took place at the LACMA in 1994. Another exhibition, entitled Masquerade: Role Playing in Self-Portraiture—Photographs from the Audrey and Sydney Irmas Collection, took place from October 12, 2006, to January 7, 2007. A third exhibition, entitled Imagining the Modern Self: Photographs from the Audrey and Sydney Irmas Collection, took place from September 29, 2012, to January 21, 2013

== Personal life ==
Irmas was married to Audrey Irmas, a philanthropist and art collector. They had two sons, Robert and Matthew, and a daughter, Deborah. They resided in Holmby Hills, Los Angeles, across the street from The Manor and Holmby Park.

== Death and legacy ==
Irmas died of leukemia at the Cedars-Sinai Medical Center in Los Angeles in 1996. He was seventy-one years old. His funeral took place at Wilshire Boulevard Temple.

A year after his death, in 1997, the Audrey and Sydney Irmas Charitable Foundation donated US$1.5 million to endow the Sydney M. Irmas Chair in Public Interest Law and Legal Ethics at the University of Southern California. It is held by Professor Erwin Chemerinsky.

The Audrey and Sydney Irmas Campus of the Wilshire Boulevard Temple, a Reform synagogue in Los Angeles, was dedicated in 1998. It is located on the corner of Olympic and Barrington Boulevards in West Los Angeles.
