= Harvey Fields =

Harvey Fields may refer to:

- Harvey J. Fields (1935–2014), American Reform rabbi
- Harvey Fields (politician) (1882–1961), American lawyer and politician from Louisiana
