= Audrey Irmas =

American philanthropist and art collector

- Born: Los Angeles, California
- Education: Fairfax High School; University of California, Los Angeles
- Occupations: Philanthropist, art collector
- Spouse: Sydney M. Irmas (dead)
- Children: Robert Irmas; Matthew Irmas; Deborah Irmas

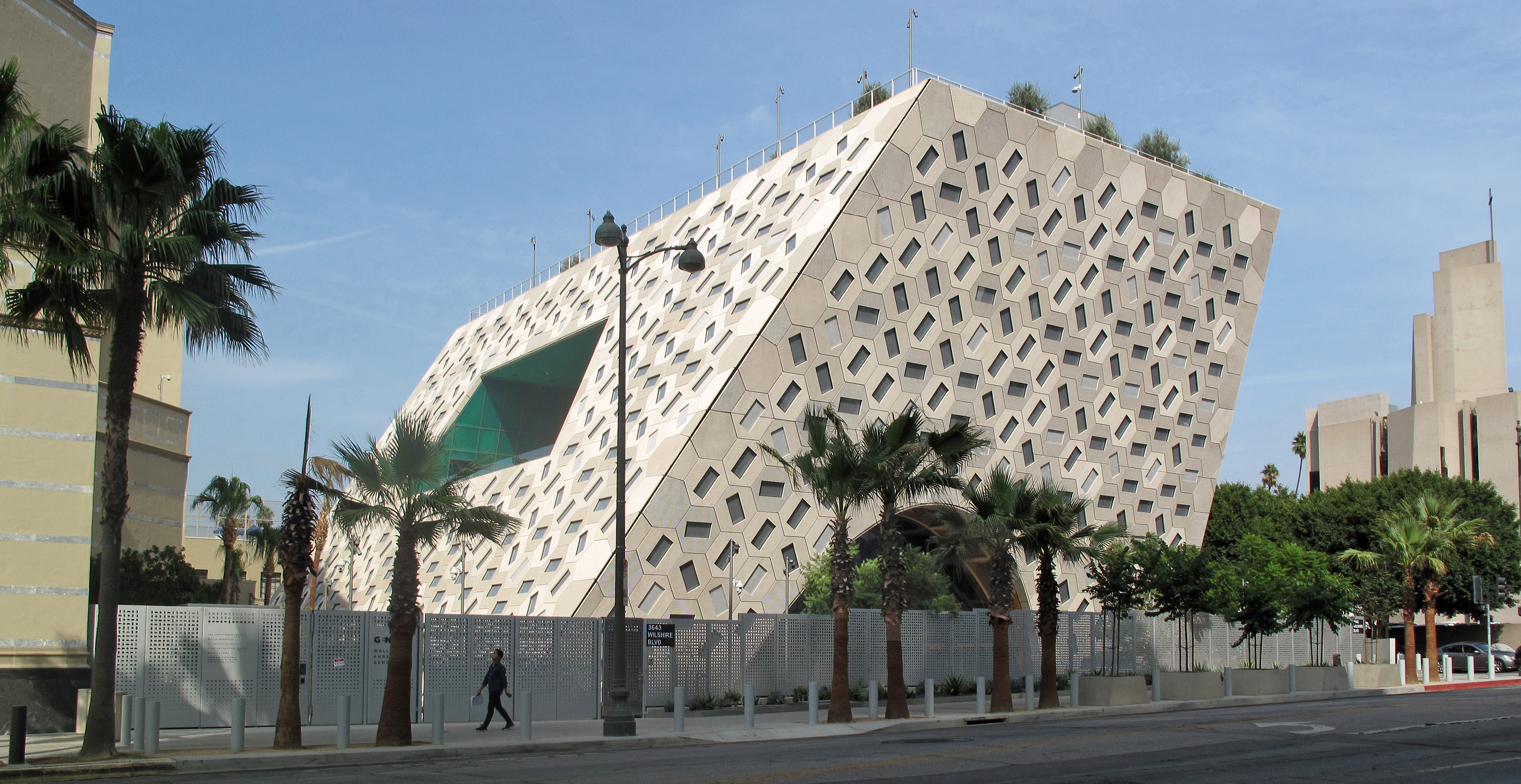
Audrey Irmas Pavilion of the Wilshire Boulevard Temple, recently opened. Los Angeles, CA.

Audrey Irmas is an American philanthropist and art collector. She has donated millions of dollars to Jewish causes, especially the Wilshire Boulevard Temple. She is one of the largest art collectors in the United States.

== Early life ==
Audrey Irmas was born in Los Angeles, California. She was educated at Fairfax High School in Los Angeles, and attended the University of California, Los Angeles (UCLA).

== Philanthropy ==
Irmas co-founded the Audrey and Sydney Irmas Charitable Foundation in 1983. In 1997, the Audrey and Sydney Irmas Charitable Foundation donated US$1.5 million to endow the Sydney M. Irmas Chair in Public Interest Law and Legal Ethics at the University of Southern California. It is held by Professor Erwin Chemerinsky. It also endowed the Audrey and Sydney Irmas Campus of the Wilshire Boulevard Temple, a Reform synagogue in Los Angeles, was dedicated in 1998. It is located on the corner of Olympic and Barrington Boulevards in West Los Angeles.

Irmas served on the board of trustees of the Museum of Contemporary Art, Los Angeles (MOCA) from 1992 to 2006. She has served as a life trustee since 2006. She served as Chairperson of the Los Angeles Family Housing Corporation, a non-profit organization which tackles homelessness in Los Angeles.

In September 2015, Irmas auctioned a painting entitled "Untitled, 1968" by Cy Twombly that she owned at Sotheby's and donated half the proceeds (an estimated US$30 million) for the construction of the Audrey Irmas Pavilion, a "55,000-square-foot new events center in Koreatown, just east of the synagogue’s historic 1929 Byzantine-Revival sanctuary." The new addition to the Wilshire Boulevard Temple is designed by Shohei Shigematsu of the Office for Metropolitan Architecture's New York office.

== Political activity ==
Irmas has made political contributions to many Democratic politicians, including Nancy Pelosi, Dick Durbin, Michelle Nunn, Tammy Duckworth, Karen Bass, Kay Hagan, Jeanne Shaheen and Henry Waxman. Additionally, she has donated to EMILY's List, an organization that helps elect pro-choice female Democrats.

== Art collection ==
Irmas started collecting photographic self-portraits with her husband in the 1970s. In 1992, they donated their collection to the Los Angeles County Museum of Art.

The Audrey and Sydney Irmas Collection made its debut at San Jose Museum of Art. Many exhibitions have been held with their daughter- Debora Irmas- as guest curator

Irmas collects paintings and sculptures. She owns Emeralds (1961) by Roy Lichtenstein. She also owns paintings by Cy Twombly. She owned a triptych by Sigmar Polke and two sculptures by Robert Gover, which she donated to the Museum of Contemporary Art, Los Angeles. She owns additional artwork by sculptor Tony Smith, painters Francis Bacon and Ed Ruscha as well as Mes Voeux by Annette Messager.

Irmas was named one of the largest American art collectors in 2003.

The Audrey Irmas Pavilion- named after the lead donor Audrey Irmas- is located in Los Angeles and serves as a place to hold multiple cultural and religious events.

== Personal life ==
Irmas is the widow of Sydney M. Irmas, a philanthropist and art collector. They had two sons, Robert and Matthew, and a daughter, Deborah. They resided in a house designed by architect Timothy Morgan Steele in Holmby Hills, Los Angeles, across the street from The Manor and Holmby Park.

Additionally, Irmas owns an apartment in The Mayfair, a historic luxury building on the Upper East Side in Manhattan, New York City.
