= Edie & Pen =

- Cover for 2003 DVD release
- Directed by: Matthew Irmas
- Written by: Victoria Tennant
- Produced by: Matthew Irmas; Victoria Tennant
- Starring: Stockard Channing; Jennifer Tilly; Scott Glenn
- Cinematography: Alicia Weber
- Edited by: Michael Ruscio
- Music by: Chris Anderson; Shawn Colvin
- Production companies: Emby Eye; 23rd Street
- Distributed by: PolyGram Filmed Entertainment (film, initial release); Image Entertainment (DVD)
- Release date: May 10, 1996 (Cannes)
- Running time: 96 minutes
- Country: United States
- Language: English

Edie & Pen, also known as Desert Gamble, is a 1996 film directed by Matthew Irmas and written by Victoria Tennant. It had its world premiere on May 10, 1996, at the Cannes Film Festival and stars Stockard Channing and Jennifer Tilly as the titular Edie and Pen, two women who make a connection in a Vegas bar. The film was later given a cable release on HBO starting in July 1996 and was also released on DVD by Image Entertainment in 2003.

== Synopsis ==
Pen and Edie are two women who have come to Reno, Nevada to secure divorces from their respective husbands. Edie is cheerful about her divorce since she's going to travel overseas to quickly remarry a man that she's been dating, while Pen is upset because her divorce was a result of her husband's philandering. Both women decide to drink at a local bar where they become fast friends, bonding over their unsuccessful marriages, as Edie's husband left her shortly after their marriage two years ago and Pen's husband Victor spent the last nine years neglecting her. They're unaware that they have a deeper bond between the two of them, as Edie's fiance is actually Victor, Pen's newly divorced husband.

At the bar they meet up with Harry, a man whose wife recently left him for another man. Much to her chagrin, Harry begins showing an immediate romantic interest in Pen, who is reluctant to return his attentions. She's urged on by Edie, as she feels that Pen would have more fun in life if she were less uptight and more spontaneous. Pen begins to slowly return Harry's feelings based on Edie's advice, only for things to turn sour when she realizes that Edie was Victor's mistress. As a result, Pen breaks things off with Harry, not believing that the relationship would ever work out. Initially intending to angrily confront her over this revelation, Pen is surprised to discover that Edie was completely unaware that Victor was married. Edie goes on to talk about her hopes for the impending marriage as she has been hurt and used repeatedly in the past, making her optimistic that her marriage to Victor will break this chain of unhealthy relationships. This causes Pen to realize that Edie is not completely to blame for her divorce and that she is just as much a victim of Victor's actions as Pen was. Knowing that an angry confrontation is now meaningless and would only negatively hurt Edie, Pen opts to keep silent and quietly leave the following day. However Edie discovers the truth when both women travel to the airport and come across Victor, who immediately recognizes both women. The film ends with Pen returning to Harry to pursue a romance while Edie chooses to travel to Acapulco with Victor, but the two are shown arguing, leaving it up to the viewer to decide if the pair ultimately married or not.

== Cast ==
- Stockard Channing as Pen
- Jennifer Tilly as Edie
- Scott Glenn as Harry
- Stuart Wilson as Victor
- Chris Sarandon as Max
- Michael O'Keefe as Ken
- Michael McKean as Rick
- Randy Travis as Pony Cobb
- Joanna Gleason as Maude
- Beverly D'Angelo as Barlady
- Martin Mull as Johnnie Sparkle
- Louise Fletcher as Judge
- Wendy Mull as Resident Witness
- Carol Ann Susi as Irma
- Missy Hargraves as Rosalee

== Production ==
In August 1995, scenes were shot at Reno–Tahoe International Airport in Reno, Nevada. Reno Air assisted the film crew during its airport shoot. At the time, the film was scheduled for release around Christmas 1995.

== Reception ==
Critical reception for Edie & Pen was mixed. Variety panned the film, writing "Director Matthew Irmas (“When the Party's Over”) fails to inject the energy to compensate for script’s lack of incident or depth and, despite exposure of Reno’s glitzy, neon-lit heart and its dust-bowl, edge-of-town areas, the picture has a rather flat visual stamp on it", but "Shawn Colvin’s bluesy, country-flavored songs provide a lift." In contrast, Time Out was more positive, commenting that "The direction leaves something to be desired, but Victoria Tennant's script is witty and well structured without seeming mechanical, and cameos from the likes of McKean, D'Angelo, Mull and Travis keep things ticking over nicely. Channing and Glenn work up an easy rapport, and it's another notch in Tilly's promising career."
