= Herscher (disambiguation) =

Herscher may refer to:

- Herscher, Illinois
- Herscher High School
- Herscher (surname)

== See also ==
- Herrscher (disambiguation)
