= Dean Goodhill =

American film editor (born 1944)

- Born: October 23, 1944 (age 81); Los Angeles, California, USA
- Occupation: film editor
- Years active: 1985-present

Dean Goodhill (October 23, 1944) is an American film editor who was nominated at the 66th Academy Awards for Best Film Editing for the film The Fugitive. He shared the nomination with Don Brochu, David Finfer, Dov Hoenig, Richard Nord and Dennis Virkler.

== Selected filmography ==
Editor
Year	Film	Director	Notes
1987	The Women's Club	Sandra Weintraub	
1987	Terminal Entry	John Kincade	
1988	Mercenary Fighters	Riki Shelach Nissimoff	
1989	Dirty Games	Gray Hofmeyr	
1990	Crossing the Line	Gary Graver	
1991	All I Want for Christmas	Robert Lieberman	
1992	When the Party's Over	Matthew Irmas	Uncredited
1993	Knights	Albert Pyun	
1993	The Fugitive	Andrew Davis	
1994	Curse of the Starving Class	J. Michael McClary	
2007	My Sexiest Year	Howard Himelstein	
2009	Blood and Bone	Ben Ramsey	Direct-to-video
2009	The Lightkeepers	Daniel Adams	

Editorial department
Year	Film	Director	Role
1987	The Women's Club	Sandra Weintraub	Editorial assistant Supervising editor
1989	The Freeway Maniac	Paul Winters	Additional editor
1989	Wild Zone	Percival Rubens	Supervising editor
1992	When the Party's Over	Matthew Irmas	Additional editor

Camera and electrical department
Year	Film	Director	Role
1971	Walkabout	Nicolas Roeg	Stills
1971	The Christian Licorice Store	James Frawley	Still photographer
1985	Once Bitten	Howard Storm	Second assistant camera

Actor
Year	Film	Director	Role
1967	A Time for Killing	Phil Karlson; Roger Corman	Bruce

Second unit director or assistant director
Year	Film	Director	Role
1990	Crossing the Line	Gary Graver	Second unit director

Thanks
Year	Film	Director	Role
1984	The Oasis	Sparky Greene	Special thanks

TV movies

Editor
Year	Film	Director
1995	Triplecross	Jenõ Hódi
1997	Gold Coast	Peter Weller

TV series

Editor
Year	Title	Notes
1990	Zorro	Episode: "Zorro: The Legend Continues"
2001	Special Unit 2	Episode: "The Wraps"
