= Harvey J. Fields =

American Reform rabbi

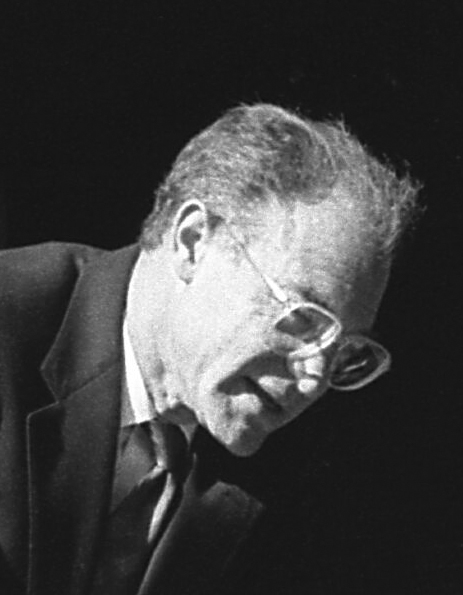
- Fields in 1988
- Born: August 26, 1935; Portland, Oregon
- Died: January 23, 2014 (aged 78); Beverly Hills, California
- Education: University of California, Los Angeles; Hebrew Union College-Jewish Institute of Religion; Rutgers University
- Occupation: Rabbi
- Spouse: Sybil Fields
- Children: Joel Fields; Debra Fields; Rachel Prishkolnik
- Relatives: Del Fields (brother) Dottie Fields Wheeler (sister)

Harvey J. Fields (1935–2014) was an American Reform rabbi. He served as the rabbi of Holy Blossom Temple in Toronto, the largest synagogue in Canada, from 1978 to 1982. He then served as the rabbi of Wilshire Boulevard Temple, the oldest synagogue in Los Angeles, from 1985 to 2003.

== Early life ==
Harvey J. Fields was born on August 26, 1935, in Portland, Oregon. His grandfather settled in The Dakotas in the 1880s. He had a brother, Del Fields, and a sister, Dottie Fields. He went to Jewish summer camps in Los Angeles, California.

He graduated from the University of California, Los Angeles (UCLA), where he received a Bachelor of Arts degree in English in 1958. He studied Jewish Theology at the Hebrew Union College-Jewish Institute of Religion in Los Angeles and Cincinnati, Ohio. He went on to receive a PhD in American foreign policy from Rutgers University.

== Career ==
He served as a rabbi in Boston, Massachusetts, and later in New Brunswick, New Jersey. He then served as the rabbi of Holy Blossom Temple in Toronto, the largest synagogue in Canada, from 1978 to 1982.

He moved to Los Angeles, California, in 1982 to become assistant rabbi of Wilshire Boulevard Temple, the oldest synagogue in Los Angeles. He then served as its senior rabbi from 1985 to 2003. During his rabbinate, he added music to the service, including the presence of a hazzan, or cantor. He also encouraged rabbis to wear the tallit, or prayer shawl.

He wrote A Torah Commentary for Our Times in 1995. He also wrote a novel about his grandfather in The Dakotas.

He served as the President of the Southern California Board of Rabbis. Additionally, he served as the Chair of the Jewish Community Relations Committee of the Los Angeles Jewish Federation and the Interreligious Council of Southern California. He also served on the Board of Governors of the Jewish Agency for Israel. As the co-founder of the Interfaith Coalition to Heal L.A., he organised the "Hands Across L.A." march shortly after the 1992 Los Angeles riots.

Thanks to a US$35 million charitable gift from philanthropist and art collector Sydney M. Irmas, he established the Audrey and Sydney Irmas Campus in West Los Angeles in 1998. This reflects the historical move of Jews from East Los Angeles to West Los Angeles after the L.A. riots in Koreatown.

He retired as rabbi of the Wilshire Boulevard Temple in 2003, when he was replaced by Rabbi Steve Leder. He served as an academic consultant for the BBC documentary Auschwitz: The Nazis and 'The Final Solution' in 2005.

== Personal life ==
He was married to Sybil Fields. They had a son, Joel Fields, and two daughters, Debra Fields and Rachel Prishkolnik. They resided in Beverly Hills, California. They also spent a year living in Netanya, Israel.

== Death ==
He died on January 23, 2014, in Beverly Hills, California. His funeral took place at the Glazer Campus of the Wilshire Boulevard Temple in Los Angeles.
