= Jack H. Skirball =

American rabbi, film producer, real estate developer and philanthropist

- Born: Jack Harold Skirball; June 23, 1896; Homestead, Pennsylvania, U.S.
- Died: December 8, 1985 (aged 89); Century City, Los Angeles, California, U.S.
- Education: Hebrew Union College University of Chicago
- Occupations: Rabbi, film producer, real estate developer, philanthropist
- Spouse: Audrey Marx
- Children: 2 daughters

Jack H. Skirball (June 23, 1896 – December 8, 1985) was an American film producer, real estate developer, philanthropist and rabbi.

== Early life ==
Jack H. Skirball was born in 1896 in Homestead, Pennsylvania. His father was an immigrant from Czechoslovakia. His mother was an immigrant from England. His father died when he was seven years old. Shortly after, he moved to Cleveland, Ohio, with his mother and nine siblings.

Skirball attended the University of Cincinnati and Western Reserve College in Cleveland, Ohio, but he dropped out. He studied at the Hebrew Union College, and he was ordained as a rabbi, following his mother's wishes. He then attended graduate school at the University of Chicago, where he studied psychology and sociology.

== Career ==
Starting in his college days, Skirball began in the film business selling short films.

Skirball went to Palestine with Abba Hillel Silver in 1919. Back in the United States, he served Reform synagogues in Cleveland, Ohio and Evansville, Indiana in the 1920s.

After moving to Los Angeles, California in 1938, he became a film producer. He served as general manager of the Educational Films Corporation of America, where he produced The Birth of a Baby, an educational film about childbearing in 1938. Skirball produced films under the Skibo label, which Educational acquired. Skibo films included Bosom Friends and Wings Over Everest.

Skirball served as vice president of Grand National Pictures, followed by president of Arcadia Pictures. He was associate producer of The Howards of Virginia, a 1940 film starring Cary Grant. A year later, in 1941, he produced This Woman is Mine. By 1942, he was associate producer of Saboteur, a film directed by Alfred Hitchcock. A year later, in 1943, he produced Shadow of a Doubt, another film directed by Hitchcock. He also produced Magnificent Doll in 1946, The Secret Fury in 1950, and Payment on Demand in 1951. He also produced A Matter of Time starring Liza Minnelli in 1976.

Skirball was the co-producer of Jacobowsky and the Colonel, a Broadway musical, alongside Jed Harris in 1944.

Skirball was a member of the Academy of Motion Picture Arts and Sciences. He believed that all films should be educational and that they should convey information in a way that is understandable to any audience member.

Skirball was also a real estate developer. In 1962, he developed the Vacation Village resort in Mission Bay, San Diego, California. In 1983, he sold it for US$51 million.

== Philanthropy ==
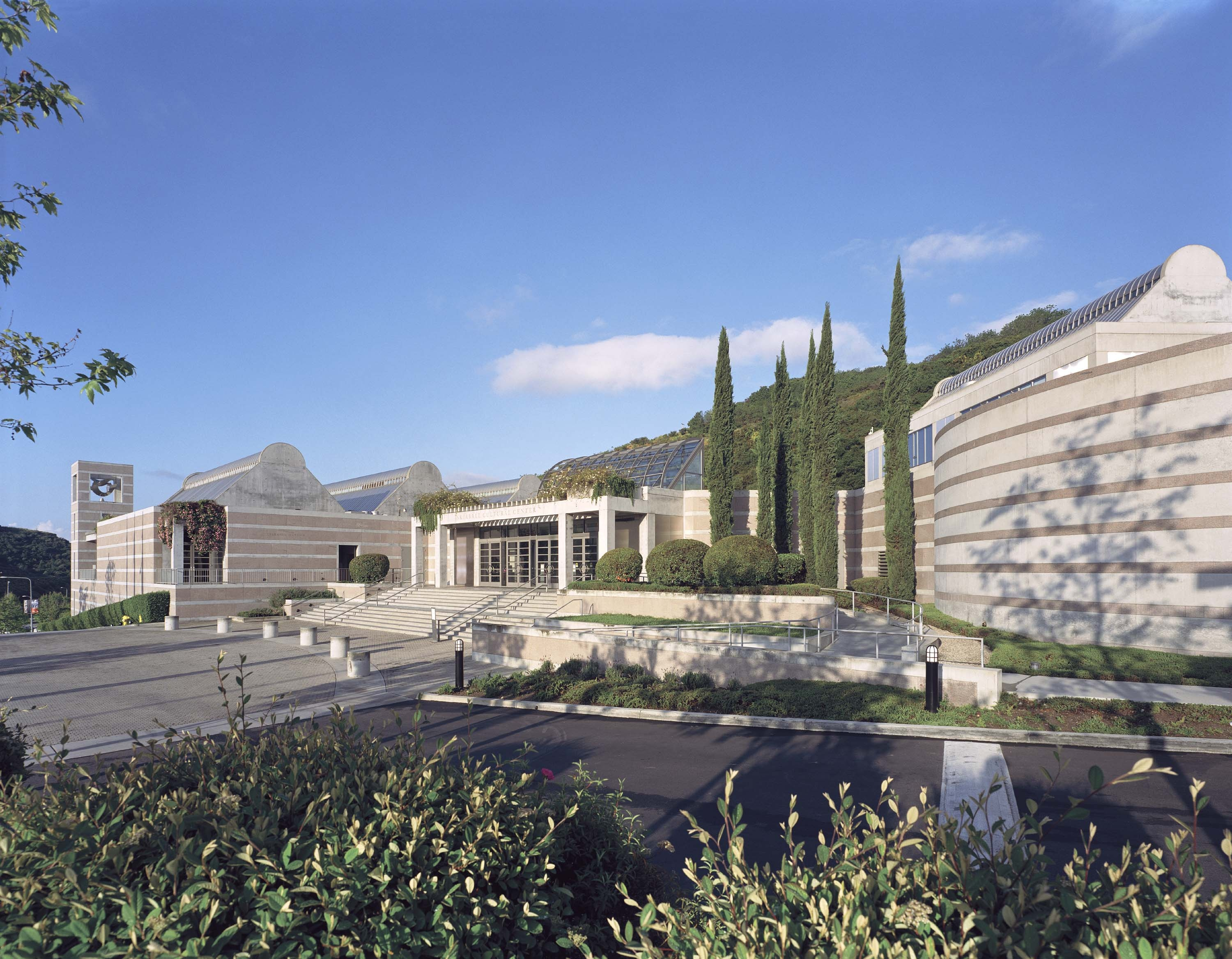
Skirball Cultural Center.

Skirball founded the Los Angeles School of Hebrew Union College. By 1972, he founded the Hebrew Union College Skirball Museum, a museum of Jewish life near the campus of the University of Southern California. His goal was to show Christians and Jews that they shared much in common, and to ""dissipate" anti-Semitism." He later donated US$3.5 million to move it to a 15-acre plot of land in Brentwood, off the Sepulveda Pass, where it was renamed the Skirball Cultural Center.

In 1985, Skirball founded the Skirball Institute on American Values, a program of the American Jewish Committee. He appointed rabbi Alfred Wolf who was its director until 1996, when the latter was replaced by Eugene Mornell. The Skirball Institute organized inter-faith conferences, essay contests for high school students, academic research on American values, and offered scholarships to college students.

== Personal life ==
In 1938, Skirball married Audrey Marx (1914–2002). They had two daughters, Sally Cochran and Agnes Skirball. They resided in a condominium in Century City, Los Angeles. Their horses competed at the Santa Anita Park.

== Death and legacy ==
Skirball died in December 1985. His funeral was held at the Wilshire Boulevard Temple.

The Alliance Jack H. Skirball Middle School in Los Angeles and the Skirball Center for the Performing Arts in New York City are named in his honor. Moreover, in 2011, the Skirball Foundation donated US$10 million to the Los Angeles School of Hebrew Union College, which was renamed in his honor.
