= Skirball Cultural Center =

Jewish educational institution in Los Angeles, California

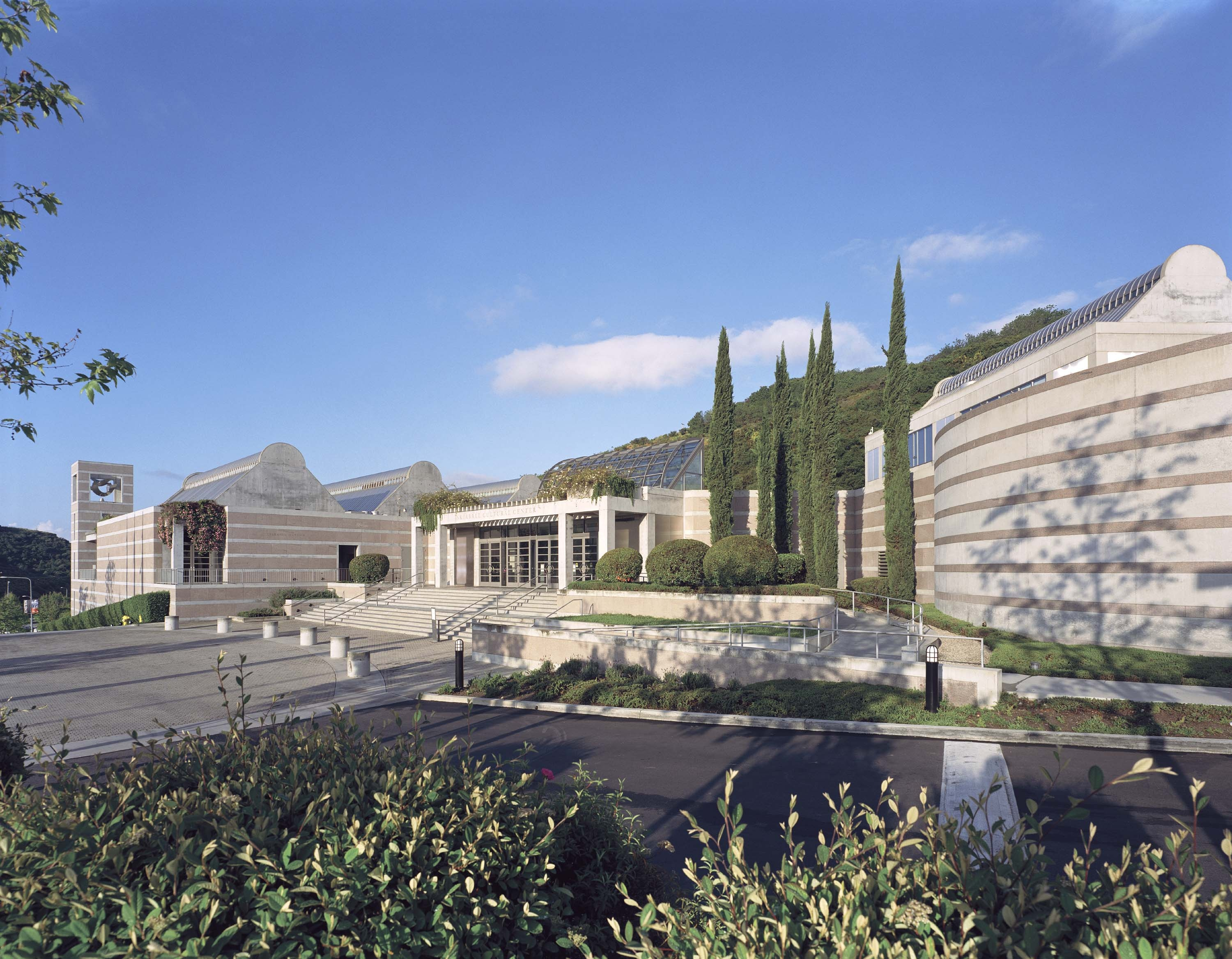
Skirball Cultural Center

The Skirball Cultural Center, founded in 1996, is a Jewish educational institution in Los Angeles, California. The center, named after philanthropist couple Jack H. Skirball and Audrey Skirball-Kenis, has a museum with regularly changing exhibitions, film events, music and theater performances, comedy, family, literary, and cultural programs. The campus includes a museum, a performing arts center, conference halls, classrooms, libraries, courtyards, gardens, and a café.

== History ==
The center’s history began with the oldest Jewish museum in the United States, established in 1913 at Hebrew Union College (HUC) in Cincinnati, Ohio. In 1972, Jack Skirball funded the museum’s relocation to the school's Los Angeles campus. He hoped the museum would build mutual understanding between Jews and Christians and help counter antisemitism. It would later became the foundation of the broader cultural center.

The idea of a center celebrating American Jewish life was proposed in 1981 by Uri D. Herscher, who was the executive vice president and dean of faculty at HUC. He imagined a shared space that would welcome both Jewish and non-Jewish visitors, the same way he felt welcomed by America as a 13 year-old immigrant.

The school's board of governors approved the project, with the stipulation that Herscher raise the money on his own. Skirball became closely involved in the project and introduced him to potential donors and supporters. Nearly one-third of the funding for the center came from non-Jewish sources, due in part to supporters like former UCLA chancellor Franklin D. Murphy, who saw the center as a reflection of American democratic ideals, in which cultural diversity contributes to a stronger society.

In 1983, a 15-acre site in the Sepulveda Pass was procured. A year later, architect Moshe Safdie joined the project. Skirball died in 1985, five years before construction began. The center opened to the public in 1996. Herscher served as the first president and chief executive with both Jews and non-Jews on the board of trustees. By 2014, the Skirball was drawing 600,000 visitors annually and held an endowment of $150 million.

== Campus and architecture ==
The center is located in the Sepulveda Pass, halfway between the westside of Los Angeles and the San Fernando valley. It was designed by Canadian-Israeli architect Moshe Safdie, who also designed the Hebrew Union College campus in Jerusalem. Construction on the campus began in 1990, culminating in a museum, space for performing arts and conferences, libraries, event spaces, courtyards, gardens, and a café. The mountainside site posed engineering constraints, including mudslide and fire risk, that shaped Safdie's design: a U-shaped layout oriented toward the Santa Monica Mountains, which also muffles noise from the adjacent freeway.

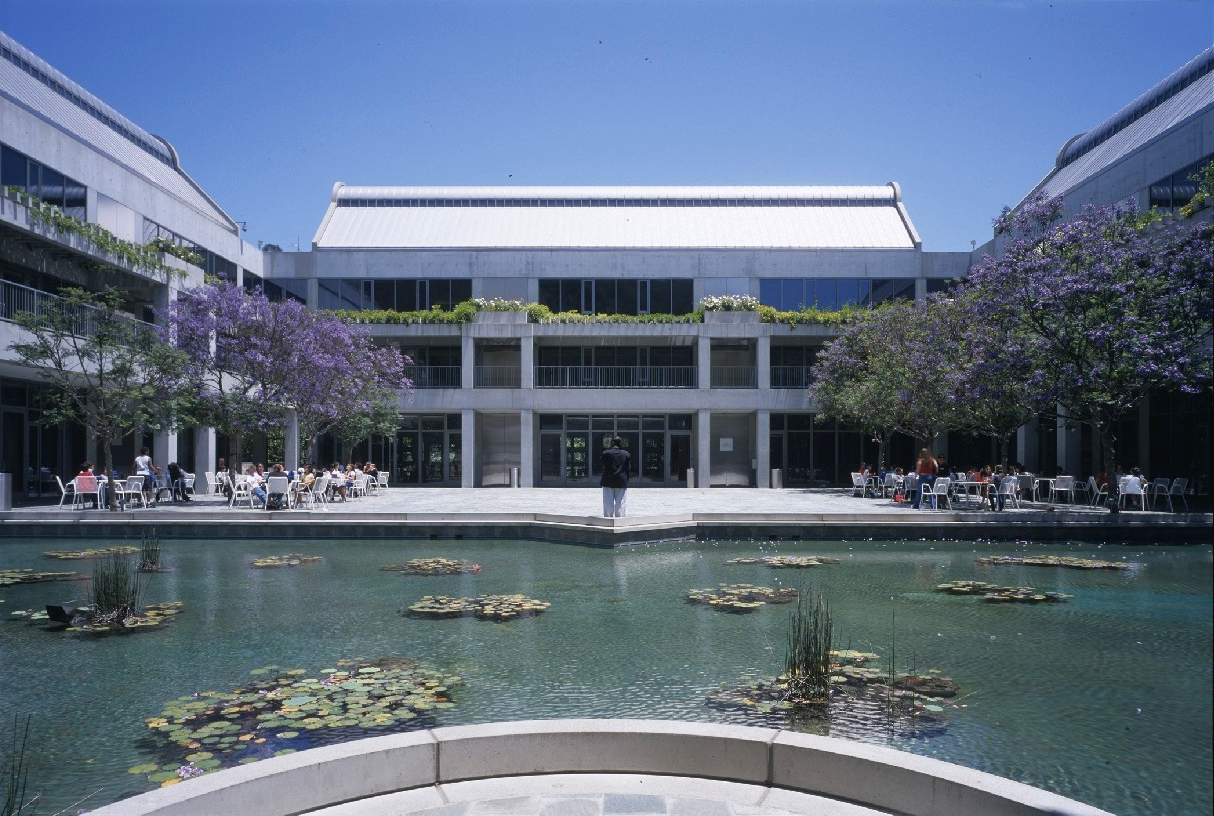
Taper Courtyard at the Skirball Cultural Center

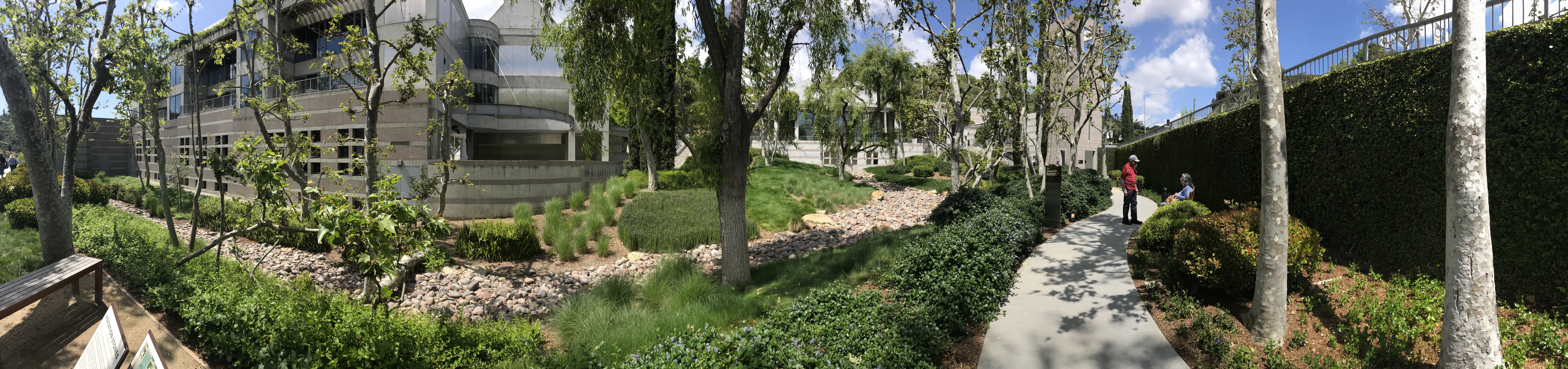
Pano of Skirball architecture

Safdie worked on the Skirball Culutral Center for several construction phases spanning nearly two decades. The resulting complex boasts his familiar bold, geometric style. The fourth and final phase was an 80,000-square-foot addition that cost $99 million. It was completed in October 2013.

== Museum collection and exhibits ==
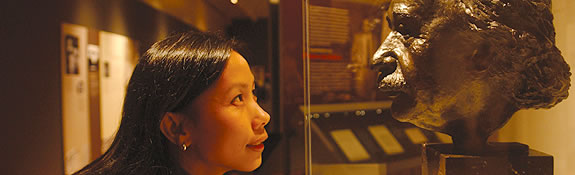
Skirball Museum

With more than 30,000 items, the Skirball is home to one of the country's largest collections of Judaica and related material. In addition to rotating exhibitions, the center features these permanent exhibitions:

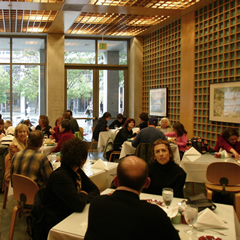
Zeidler's Café at the Skirball Cultural Center

=== Visions and Values: Jewish Life from Antiquity to America ===
This core exhibition traces the history, experiences, and values of Jews over 4,000 years. Drawing on the museum's artifacts, documents, artwork, photographs, and sound recordings, the exhibit traces how Jewish communities adapted across civilizations while preserving core traditions. Visitors move through galleries and multimedia installations, culminating with the Jewish experiences in the United States.

A central theme links Jewish tradition to American democratic ideals: Hanukkah and Passover to religious and political freedom, Purim to minority rights, Sukkot to Thanksgiving, the Hebrew prophets to the founding fathers, and the Ten Commandments to the Declaration of Independence.

Rainbow Arbor

=== Noah's Ark ===
Noah's Ark is a permanent interactive exhibition for children and families based on the biblical flood narrative. The 8,000 square foot exhibition, designed by architects Alan Maskin and Jim Olson of Olson Kundig, with work by puppeteer Chris Green, opened in 2007 after five years and $5 million in development. Featuring a 17-foot-tall ark and roughly 400 animal figures, visitors travel through three areas: first to create a storm, then to explore the ark and its animals, and finally a dry land area.

Following a renovation, the exhibit reopened in December 2025 with new gallery spaces, slides to exit the ark, and the new Bloom Garden. Over its first 18 years, it drew over one million visitors.

=== Discovery Center ===
The two-floor Discovery Center teaches visitors about archaeology through a simulated outdoor dig site.

== Education offerings ==
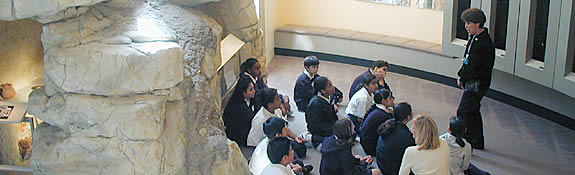
Education

According to the center's 2025–2026 education impact report, its school programs reached approximately 25,000 students and educators that year, in person and virtually.
