= Steve Leder =

American rabbi and scholar (born 1960)

- Title: Senior Rabbi

Personal life
- Born: June 3, 1960 (age 66) Saint Louis Park, Minnesota, United States
- Children: 2
- Parent(s): Leonard and Barbara Leder
- Education: Northwestern University

Religious life
- Religion: Judaism
- Denomination: Reform Judaism

Jewish leader
- Synagogue: Wilshire Boulevard Temple
- Residence: Los Angeles, California, United States

Steve Leder (born June 3, 1960) is an American rabbi, scholar, author and Jewish community leader. Twice-named in Newsweek Magazine's list of the ten most influential rabbis in America, Steve Leder is the Senior Rabbi of Wilshire Boulevard Temple in Los Angeles, which serves approximately 2,400 families at three campuses. Rabbi Leder joined Wilshire Boulevard Temple in 1987, and succeeded Rabbi Harvey J. Fields as Senior Rabbi in 2003.

== Education ==
Leder holds a degree in writing from Northwestern University, where he graduated cum laude. He also studied at Trinity College, Oxford University. He then obtained a master's degree in Hebrew Letters in 1986. He received his Rabbinical Ordination in 1987 from Hebrew Union College in Cincinnati, OH.

== Career ==
In 1987 Leder became the Assistant Rabbi of Wilshire Boulevard Temple. He also taught Homiletics at Hebrew Union College for 13 years. In 2003 Leder became the Temple's Senior Rabbi where he continues to serve in that position. Wilshire Boulevard Temple was founded in 1862 and is the oldest synagogue in Southern California, serving over 2400 families at three campuses. These include the Erika J. Glazer Family Campus in Wilshire Center/Koreatown, the Audrey and Sydney Irmas Campus in West Los Angeles, the Steve Breuer Conference Center, Camp Hess Kramer and Gindling Hilltop Camp in Malibu, California. Wilshire Boulevard Temple schools include: The Erika J. Glazer and Mann Family Early Childhood Centers, Brawerman Elementary School East and West, and Gloria & Peter S. Gold and Edgar F. Magnin religious schools which serve congregants and the surrounding community.

== Awards ==
Leder is a fellow in the British-American Project, an international gathering of over 1,200 leaders and opinion formers from a broad spectrum of worldviews. In 2012 he presented at the Aspen Ideas Festival. He received the Louis Rappaport Award for Excellence in Commentary by the American Jewish Press Association and the Kovler Award from the Religious Action Center in Washington, D.C. for his work in African American Jewish dialogue.

== Wilshire Boulevard Temple: restoration project and social outreach ==
In 2008, Leder began a renovation and expansion project of Wilshire Boulevard Temple's historic Koreatown campus. In 2011, the temple closed for the first phase of the $225 million-dollar restoration and expansion. Leder initiated and managed the capital fundraising campaign for this project. The historic sanctuary reopened for the High Holy Days in September 2013.

The second phase of the campus redevelopment included a 500-car parking structure, a sports complex for students, the renovation of the campus’ two school buildings and building the Karsh Family Social Service Center at the Temple's Koreatown Campus. The Karsh Center provides free services, including a food pantry, medical, vision, dental and mental health care, along with legal aid, ESL and book distribution. Additional services offer support groups to assist with loss and trauma. Seasonal outreaches include Build-a-Bike, a daylong event where bikes are assembled for delivery to underserved kids; The Big Give, an annual distribution of Thanksgiving meals; Jews with Tools, a program that provides volunteers to build houses for low-income residents.

The third and final phase of Wilshire Boulevard Temple's renovation will be the Audrey Irmas Pavilion, an event center designed by Pritzker Prize winning architect Rem Koolhaas. The Pavilion is scheduled to open in early 2021.

== Relationship with evangelicals ==
Wilshire Boulevard Temple has a long-standing history of inter-religious collaboration. Nearby evangelical congregations partner with Wilshire Boulevard Temple and conduct joint bible studies. Wilshire Boulevard Temple is also home to the largest annual gathering of Muslims and Jews in Los Angeles each year to honor the end of Ramadan. Rabbi Leder's books are considered global in their application. Evangelicals and non-religious groups have welcomed Leder to appear as a guest on several Christian TV and radio broadcasts.

== Writings ==
Leder is the author of five books. The Extraordinary Nature of Ordinary Things, More Money Than God: Living a Rich Life Without Losing Your Soul, and More Beautiful Than Before; How Suffering Transforms Us; The Beauty of What Remains and For You When I Am Gone: Twelve Essential Questions to Tell a Life Story. He has published essays in Reform Judaism, the Los Angeles Times, the New York Times, TIME magazine, Town and Country, Beliefnet.com, and The Jewish Journal where his Torah commentaries were read weekly by over 50,000 people. Leder is a contributor to Charles Barkley's book, Who's Afraid of a Large Black Man? In it, Leder discussed the connections between economics, religion and racism.

== Genocide denial ==
Leder has come out as a proponent of Gaza genocide denial.

== Media ==
Leder has been a guest on CBS This Morning, ABC, NPR, PBS, FOX and The Steve Harvey Show, two appearances on ABC's Politically Incorrect, NPR, Dennis Miller, The Tavis Smiley Show, Cavuto and Friends, Scarborough Country, Fox Family and Friends and ABC Overnight. He is the subject of the documentary film Restoring Your Tomorrow, and his sermon on capital punishment was included in an award-winning episode of The West Wing. He is a regular contributor to NBC's The Today Show, TIME Books, and Maria Shriver's Sunday Paper.
