= Pellissier Building and Wiltern Theatre =

Los Angeles Historic-Cultural Monument

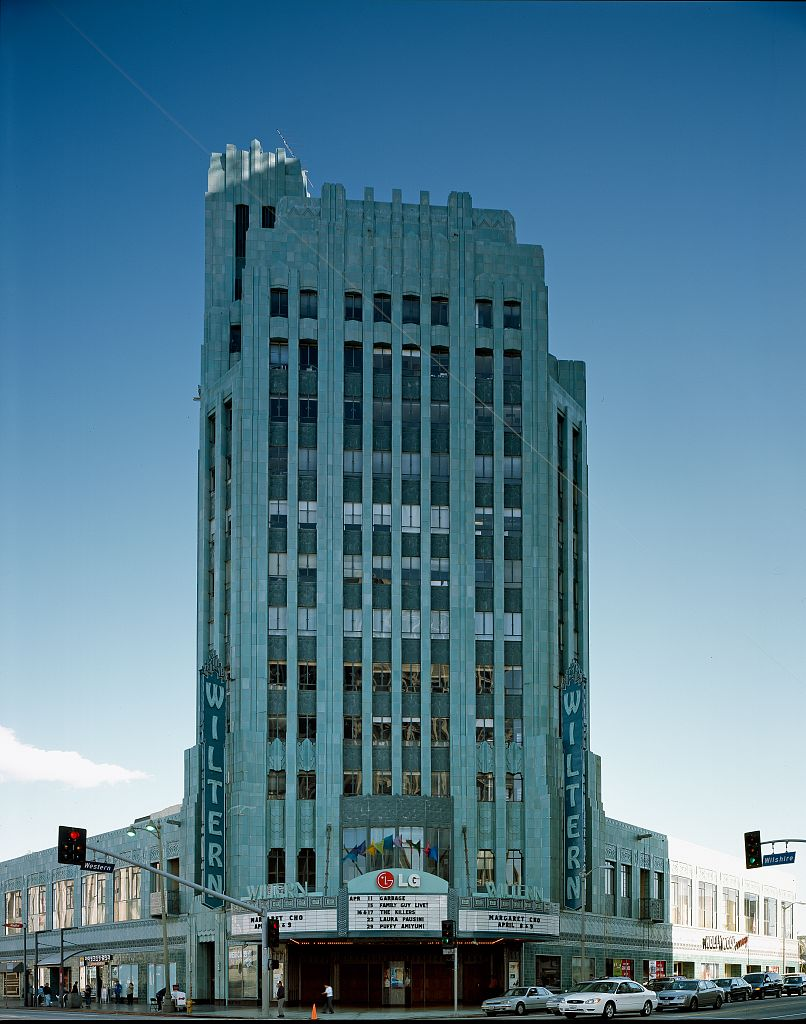

- Location within Los Angeles Location within the Los Angeles metropolitan area Location within California Location within the United States
- Former names: Wiltern Theatre; The Wiltern Center

General information
- Status: Completed
- Type: Commercial offices cinema
- Architectural style: Art Deco
- Location: 3780 Wilshire Boulevard
- Coordinates: 34.0611°N 118.3078°W
- Construction started: 1930
- Completed: 1931
- Renovated: 1983

Height
- Height: 155 ft (47 m)

Technical details
- Floor count: 12

Design and construction
- Architects: Stiles O. Clements; G. Albert Lansburgh
- Architecture firm: Morgan, Walls & Clements
- Main contractor: William Simpson Construction Company

Other information
- Seating capacity: 1,850

Website
- Wiltern Theatre Website
- Pellissier Building and Wiltern Theatre
- U.S. National Register of Historic Places
- Los Angeles Historic-Cultural Monument
- Built: 1931
- Architect: Stiles O. Clements; G. Albert Lansburgh
- Architectural style: Art Deco
- NRHP reference No.: 79000488
- LAHCM No.: 118

Significant dates
- Added to NRHP: February 23, 1979
- Designated LAHCM: 16 May 1973

The Pellissier Building and adjoining Wiltern Theatre is a 12-story, 155-foot (47 m) Art Deco landmark at the corner of Wilshire Boulevard and Western Avenue in Los Angeles, California. The entire complex is commonly referred to as the Wiltern Center. Clad in a blue-green glazed architectural terra-cotta tile and situated diagonal to the street corner, the complex is considered one of the finest examples of Art Deco architecture in the United States. The Wiltern building is owned privately, and the Wiltern Theatre is operated by Live Nation's Los Angeles division.

== Location ==
The Wiltern Theatre is located at the western edge of the Los Angeles neighborhood of Koreatown, at the southeast corner of Wilshire Boulevard and Western Avenue. The Koreatown district is served by bus and Metro Rail; the Wiltern Theatre sits directly across from the Wilshire/Western Station of the D Line subway.

== Description ==
Named after the family that owned the land upon which it was developed, the Pellissier Building is a 12-story steel-reinforced concrete office tower. Set upon a two-story pedestal that contains ground floor retail and the theater entrance, the tower has narrow vertical windows that sweep the eye upward and create the illusion of a much taller building (buildings in Los Angeles were restricted from being higher than the city hall until the late 1950s). The tower is an example of French Zig-Zag Moderne styling.

The entrance to the Wiltern Theatre is flanked by large vertical neon signs, while patrons approach the ticket booth set back among colorful terrazzo paving. The Wiltern's interior was designed by G. Albert Lansburgh and is renowned for its Art Deco design containing decorative plaster and tile work along with colorful murals painted by Anthony Heinsbergen. The most dramatic element of the design is the sunburst on the ceiling of the auditorium, with each ray its own Art Deco skyscraper—Lansburgh's vision of the future of Wilshire Boulevard. When the Wiltern first opened, it also housed the largest theater pipe organ in the western United States.

Both the Wiltern Theatre and the Pellissier Building have been named to the National Register of Historic Places and declared a Los Angeles Historic-Cultural Monument by the City of Los Angeles.

== History ==
Originally built in 1931, the Wiltern was designed by architect Stiles O. Clements of Morgan, Walls & Clements, the city's oldest architectural firm. The Wiltern Theatre was originally designed as a vaudeville theater and initially opened as the Warner Brothers Western Theater, the flagship for the theater chain. The building and theater were built by the William Simpson Construction Company. After closing a year later, the theater reopened in the mid-1930s and was renamed the Wiltern Theatre for the major intersection which it faces (Wilshire Boulevard and Western Avenue).

In 1956, the building and theater were sold to the Franklin Life Insurance Company of Springfield, Illinois. The Los Angeles chapter of the American Theater Organ Enthusiasts worked to restore the theater's 37-rank Kimball pipe organ—reputed to be the largest one in Los Angeles at the time—and held recitals there through the late 1960s and into the mid-1970s.

However, the owners ignored the landmark building, and by the late 1970s, the Wiltern had fallen into disrepair. Only the intervention of a group of local preservationists saved the complex from being demolished on two occasions in the late 1970s, when the owners filed for demolition permits. (The preservation of the Wiltern was one of the Los Angeles Conservancy's first victories in its fight to preserve the architectural heritage of the city.)

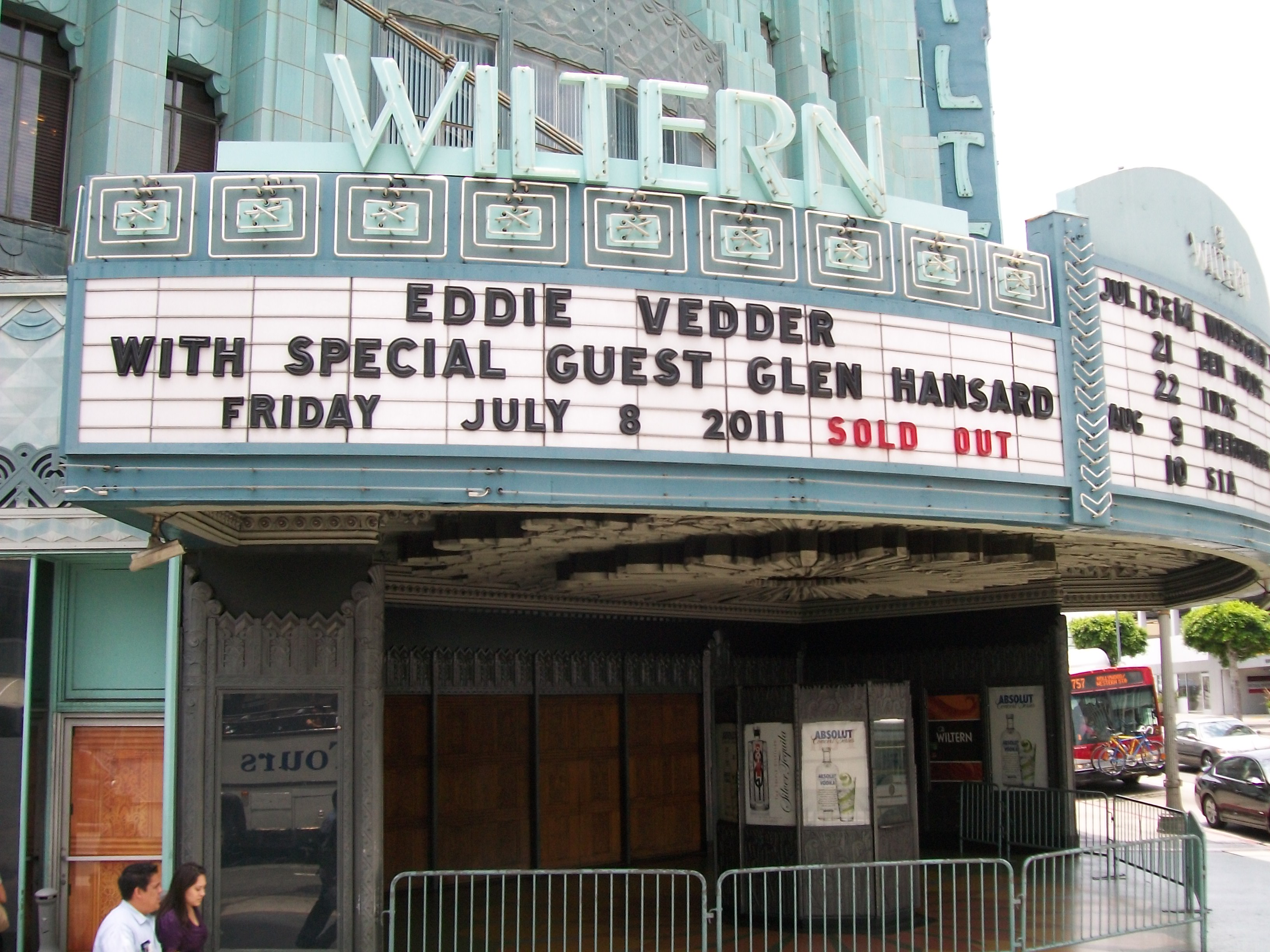
Wiltern LG in 2011

In 1981, the Wiltern was purchased by developer Wayne Ratkovich, who worked with architect Brenda Levin to restore both the theater and the office building to their former glory. Previous successes with the Fine Arts Building and the Oviatt Building renovations in downtown Los Angeles and the refurbishing of the nearby Chapman Market complex on Sixth Street convinced many in the city that they were the right people for the job.

The renovation of the office building was complete by 1983, but the Wiltern Theatre presented a much more difficult problem and took another two years to complete. The theater had been poorly maintained. Many of the murals and plasterwork were damaged, many of the fixtures had been sold off or pillaged, and portions of the ceiling had crashed onto the ground floor seats. It had also been used as the primary location for the film Get Crazy, which caused further damage.

To restore the theater to its original state required expert craftsmanship by A.T. Heinsbergen, son of the original painter, and some creativity to replace what had been lost. This included salvaging vintage Art Deco seats from the soon-to-be-renovated Paramount Theater in Portland, Oregon. Furthermore, while it was originally designed and run as a movie theater, Ratkovich wanted to convert the Wiltern into a performing arts center that could host live concerts and Broadway-level stage performances—which entailed opening up the rear wall and extending the stage and stage house of the theater back 15 feet (4.6 m).

After a four-year renovation the Wiltern Theatre opened again to the public on May 1, 1985, with performances by the Alvin Ailey American Dance Theater company. Bill Graham Presents was retained to provide the oversight of the theater booking and operations. The Wiltern was operated as a producing theater, and hosted its own live performances and those sponsored by Avalon Attractions, Goldenvoice, Concerts West, Universal Concerts, Timeless Entertainment, and many others, and was used for many televised events, commercial filming and feature film locations.

On August 7, 1985, Tom Petty and the Heartbreakers played a show at the theater, and most of the live show was subsequently used for Petty's first official live release Pack Up the Plantation: Live! The concert was also filmed.

Flyer for Sepultura's final North American concert from May 2026 (shown above), photo taken nearby the Westchester/Veterans station in Inglewood

The Wiltern originally seated 2,344. Subsequent modifications in 2002 removed the 1,200 permanent seats on the ground floor to allow for a variety of configurations from a standing-room-only crowd of 2,300 to a more intimate seated arrangement holding 1850 people. The loge and mezzanine levels in the balcony continue to offer fixed theater seats. The venue remains one of the largest theaters in Los Angeles.

SFX obtained the lease for the operation of the Wiltern in July 2000, and its successor companies Clear Channel Entertainment and Live Nation have continued to present a wide range of performances at the Wiltern. LG, a South Korea–based consumer electronics company, held the naming rights to the theater, which was then renamed the Wiltern LG from October 2003 until October 2006. Today, the theater is known familiarly as the Wiltern.

In October 2018, Sugar Studios LA expanded its post-production facilities from the 9th floor in the Art Deco-era Wiltern Theater Tower in L.A.’s Koreatown, unveiling a dual-purpose 25-seat Dolby Atmos mix stage and 4K color DI theater on the building’s penthouse floor.

In November 2019, Madonna performed 10 concerts in the venue, as part of her Madame X Tour, and was notably late to take the stage.

In the midst of the Coronavirus in April 2020, The Wiltern posted a message on the marquee saying, "Be Kind. Stay healthy. Visit Wiltern.com for updates"

In November 2020, The Wiltern was used as a polling place for the presidential election.

On May 29, 2026, Brazilian metal band Sepultura performed their final North American show at the Wiltern, with support from Exodus, Biohazard and Tribal Gaze.

== Gallery ==
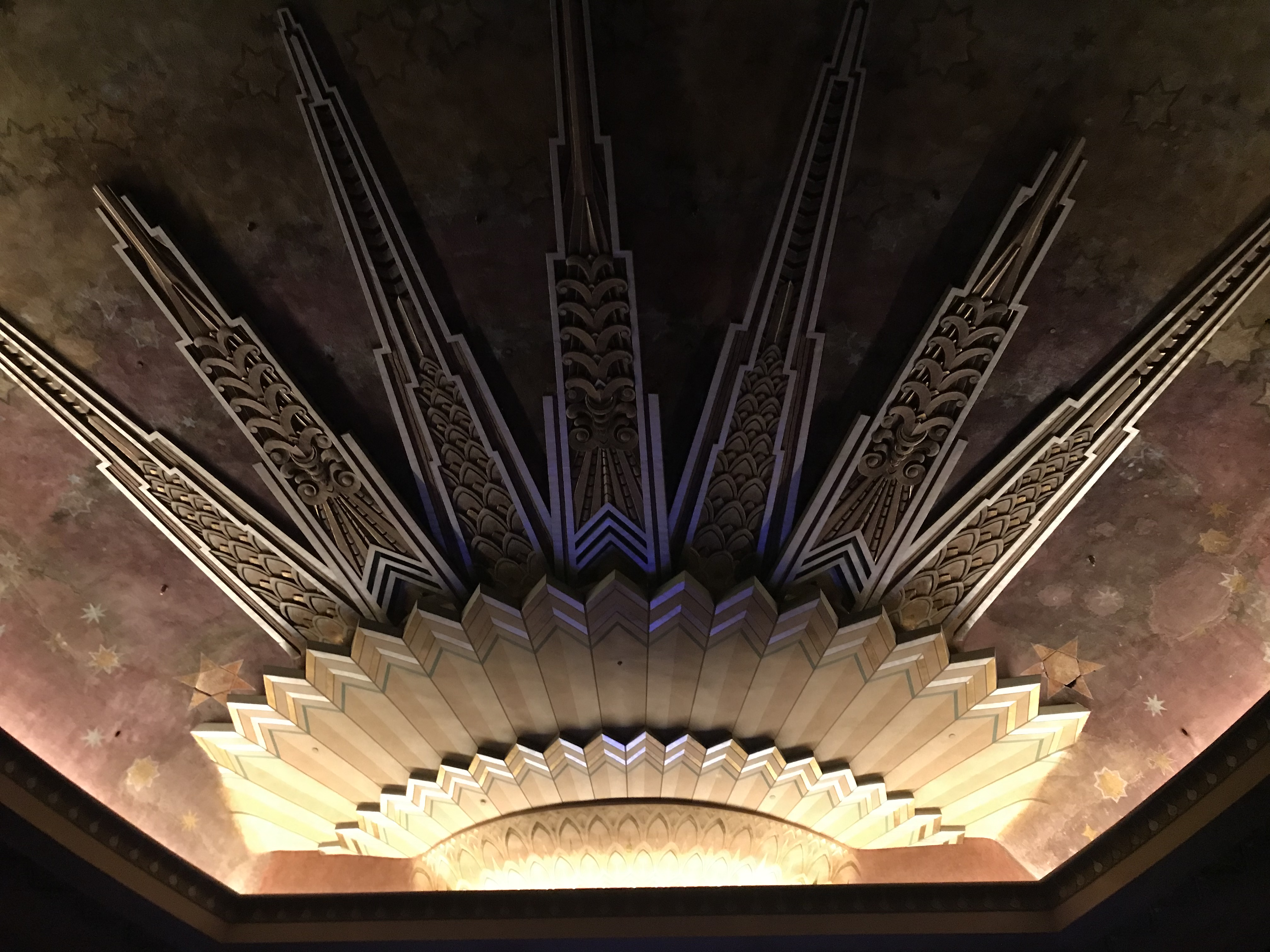
Ceiling embellishment

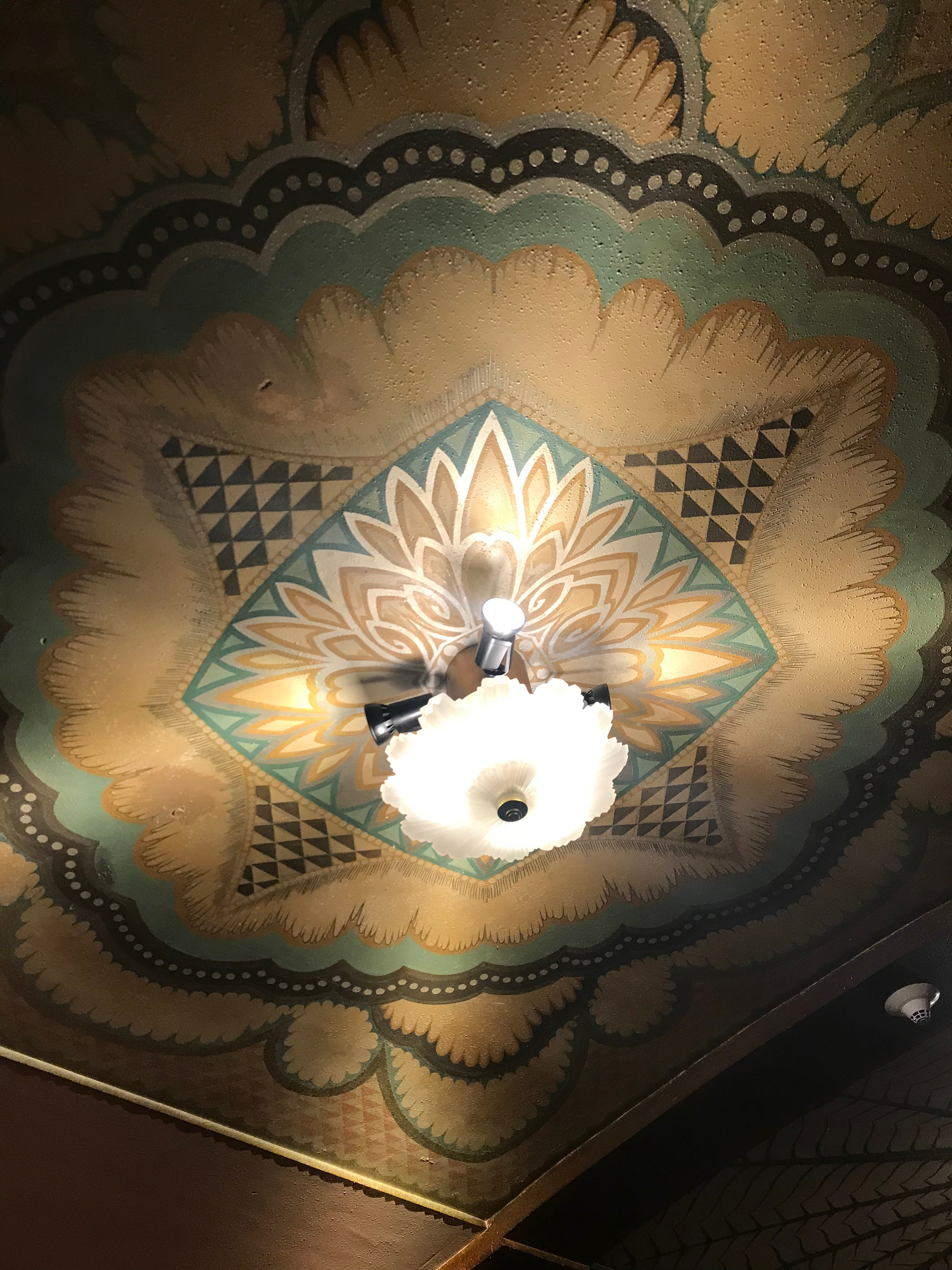
Ceiling detail

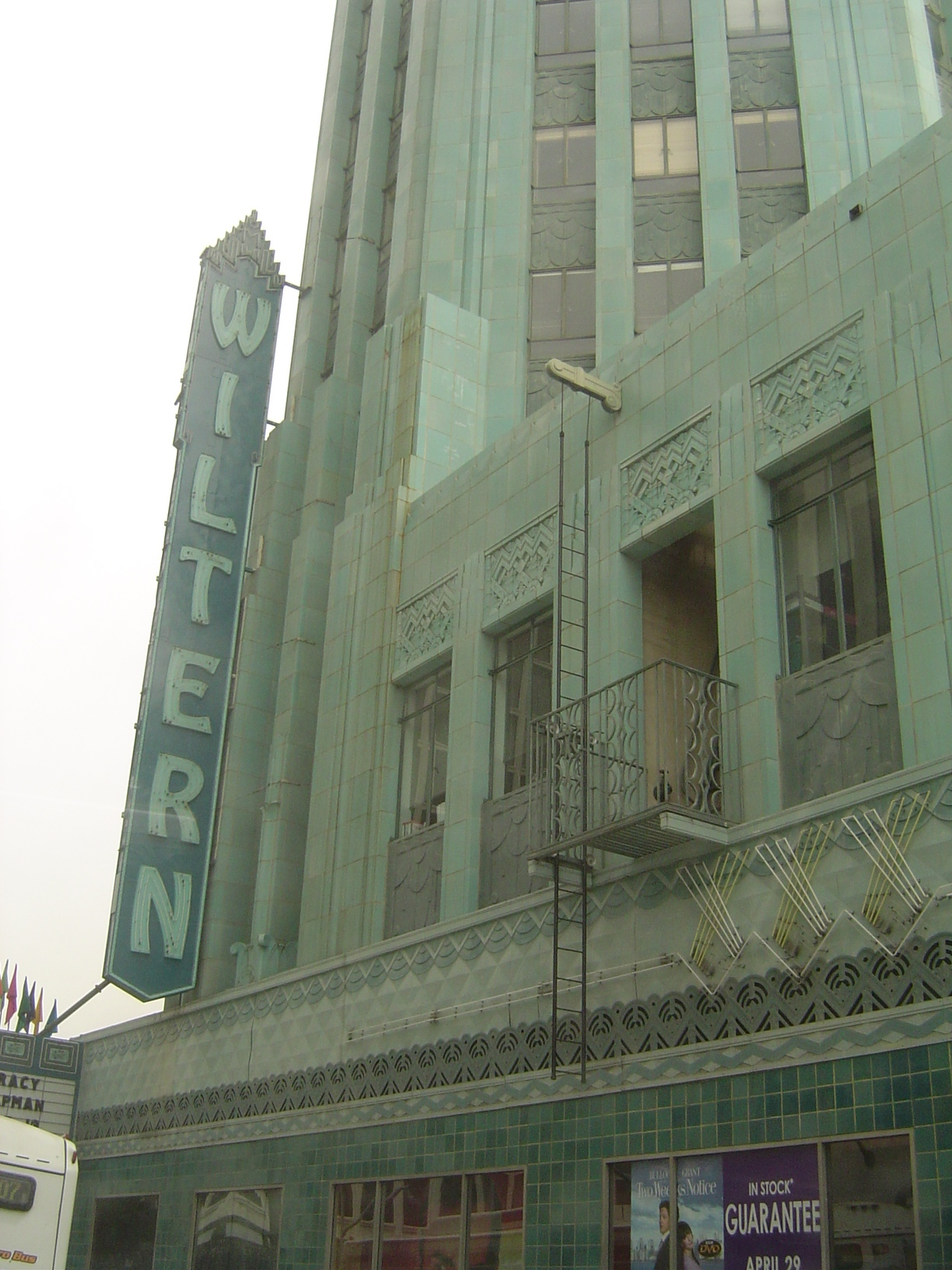
The façade

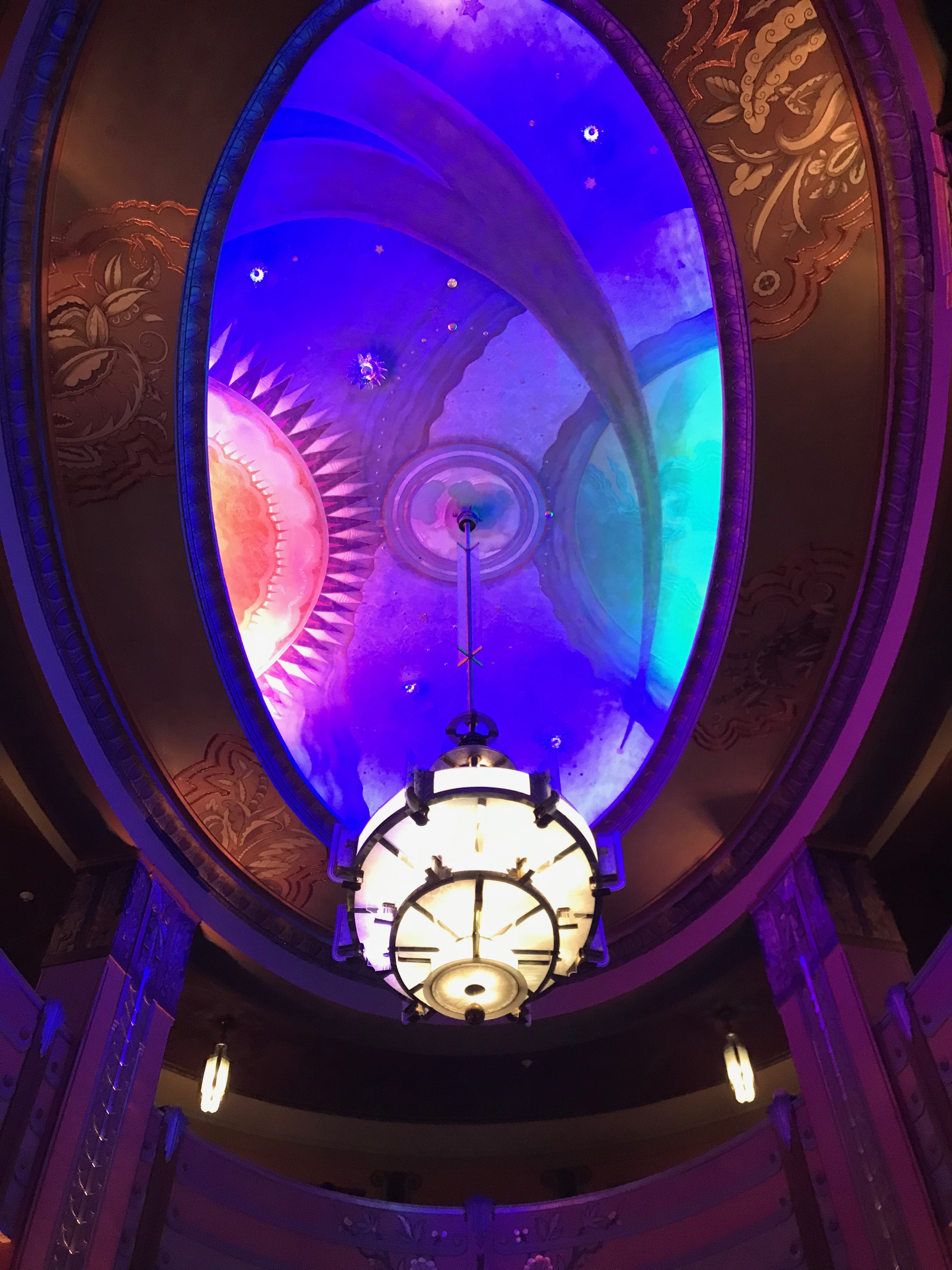
Lobby ceiling

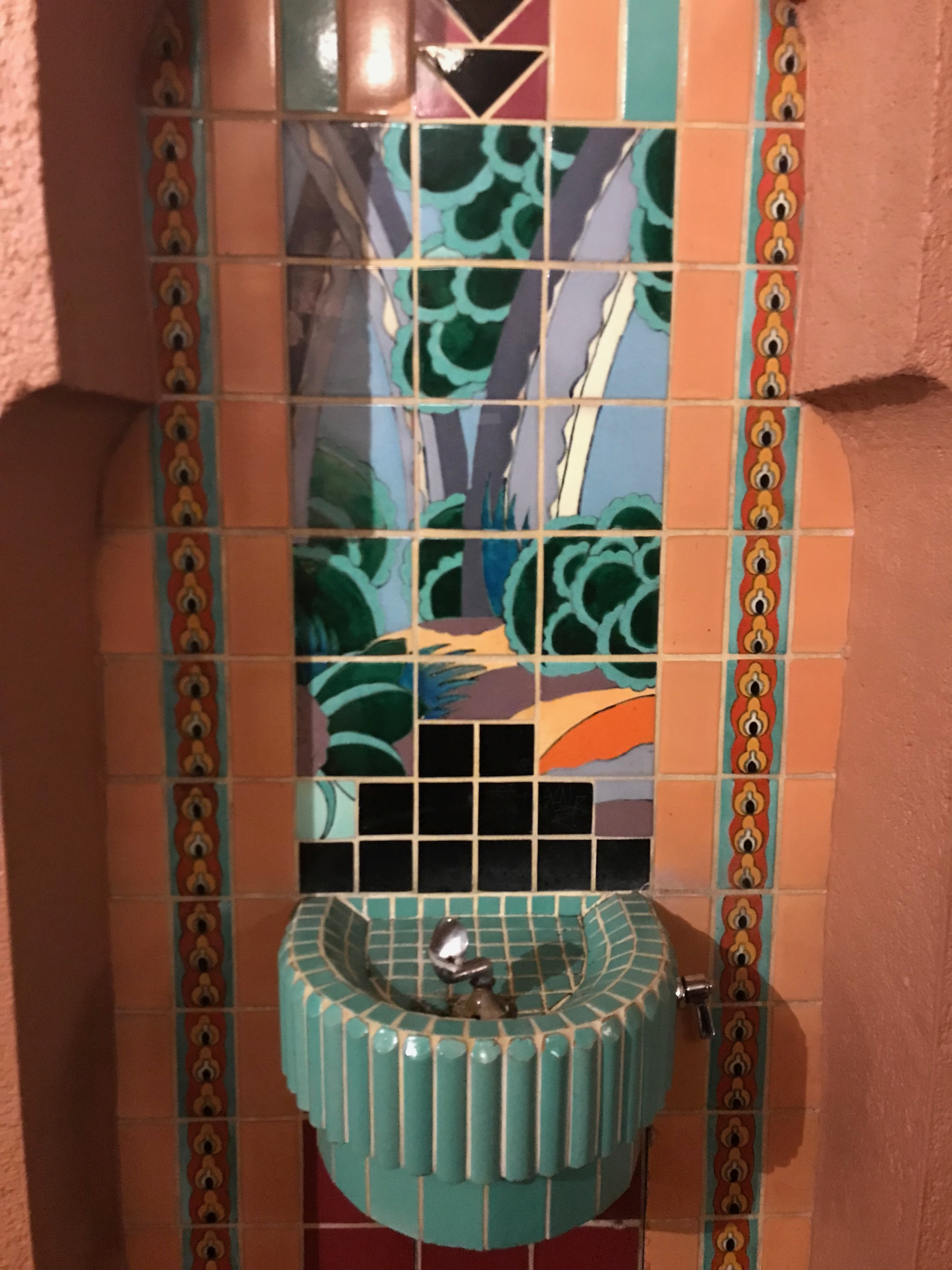
Tilework drinking fountain

== See also ==
- List of Registered Historic Places in Los Angeles
- List of Los Angeles Historic-Cultural Monuments in the Wilshire and Westlake areas
- House of Blues
