= Herrscher =

Herrscher may refer to:

== People ==
- Enrique Herrscher (born 1944), Argentine economist, systems scientist, and professor
- Rick Herrscher (born 1936), American baseball player

== Other uses ==
- Der Herrscher, a 1937 German film
- Herrschers, characters in the video game Honkai Impact 3rd

== See also ==
- Herscher (disambiguation)
