= Uri D. Herscher =

American rabbi and academic

Uri Herscher
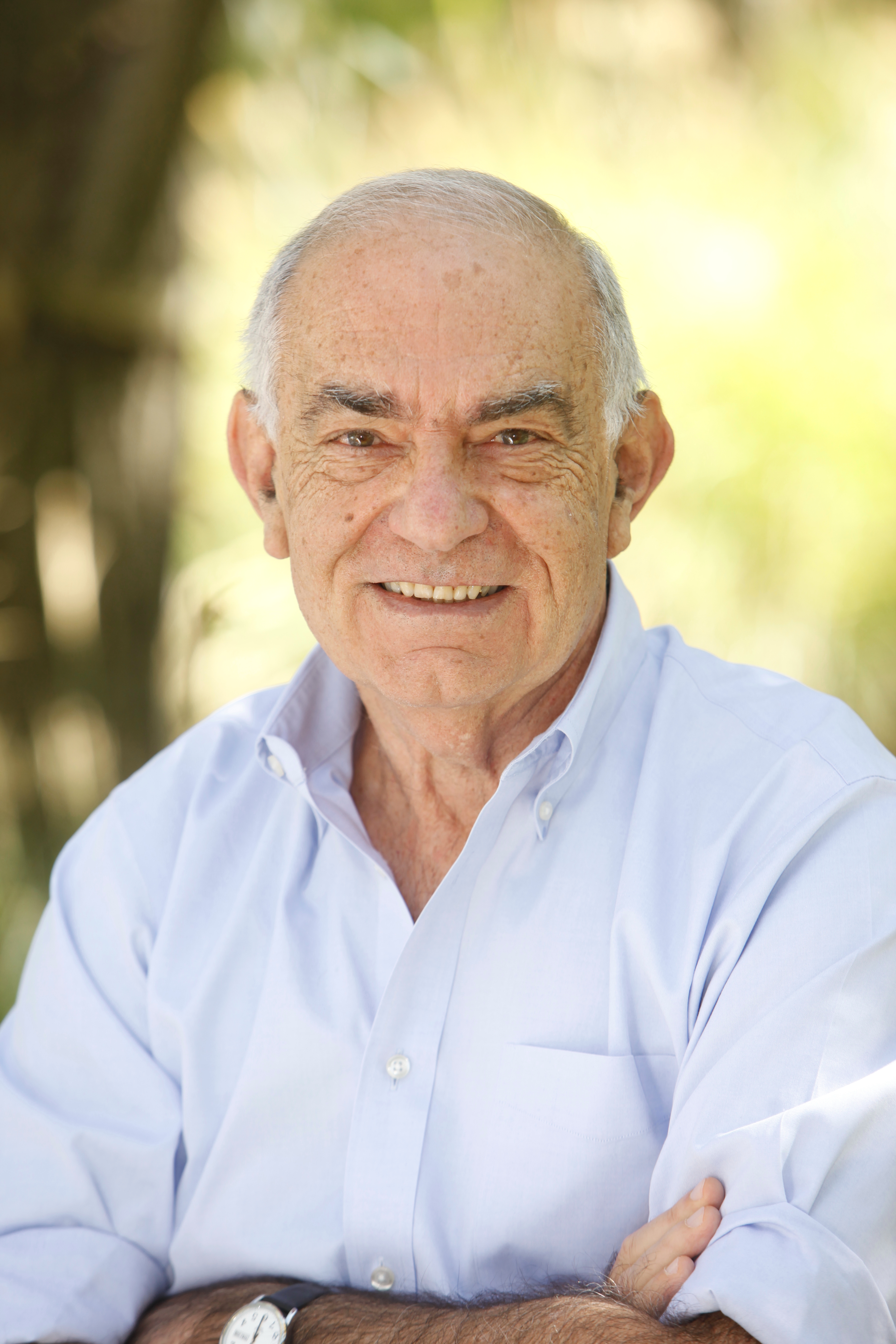
- Uri Herscher
- Born: March 14, 1941 (age 85); Tel Aviv
- Occupation: Founder
- Employer: Skirball Cultural Center
- Website: skirball.org

Uri D. Herscher (born March 14, 1941) is an American Reform rabbi and academic who founded and served as president and CEO of the Skirball Cultural Center in Los Angeles. In 2020, Herscher retired from the Skirball Center.

== Early life and education ==
Herscher was born in Tel Aviv, Israel to Lucy, a laundress, and Joseph Herscher, a cabinetmaker. His parents fled Germany in the mid-1930s; their parents and many of Herscher's relatives were murdered in Nazi death camps.

In 1954, Herscher, his parents, and his younger brother, Eli, moved to San Jose, California. In high school, he was elected student body president. He attended the University of California, Berkeley, where he graduated in 1964 with a BA in history and sociology. During his undergraduate years he founded Cal Camp, a summer camp that serves underprivileged children in the San Francisco Bay Area. Robert D. Haas was also a counselor at Cal Camp, and would years later help Herscher to build the Skirball Center.

Though not religious, Herscher's interest in Jewish culture caused him to attend Hebrew Union College-Jewish Institute of Religion, a Reform seminary. He was ordained a Rabbi there in 1970. After that, while working in an administrative position at the College-Institute, he pursued a doctorate in American Jewish history under the guidance of Stanley F. Chyet, a protégé of Jacob Rader Marcus.

Herscher's dissertation, on utopian farm colonies established by American Jewish immigrants in the 1880s, was eventually published, followed by several other immigration studies.

== Career ==
=== Hebrew Union College–Jewish Institute of Religion ===
As a graduate student, Herscher served as National Dean of Admissions of Hebrew Union College–Jewish Institute of Religion. In 1975, he was named professor of American Jewish history and executive vice president and dean of the faculty, a position he held for twenty years (1975–1995). In his role as Dean, Herscher oversaw Hebrew Union campuses in Cincinnati, Los Angeles, New York, and Jerusalem.

In 1979, Herscher moved his office from Cincinnati to Los Angeles, then emerging as the second largest Jewish community in the U.S. Recognizing that the vast majority of Jews were unaffiliated and increasingly indifferent to Jewish concerns, and acknowledging "the failure of existing institutions to speak meaningfully" to them, he envisioned a new strategy of communal outreach and engagement: the creation of a cultural center that would focus on the American Jewish experience. The center would house the College-Institute's Skirball Museum, with a significant collection of artifacts and venues for public lectures, performing arts, and educational activities for children and families. Jack H. Skirball's foundation provided the seed funding, the College-Institute approved the project as an extension in 1981, on the condition that Herscher secure the funds himself.

=== Skirball Cultural Center ===
Over the next decade, with help from key supporters such as Skirball, Los Angeles Times Chairman Franklin Murphy, and the Levi Strauss family of San Francisco, Herscher raised the money from both Jewish and non-Jewish benefactors. A fifteen-acre site was acquired in the Santa Monica mountains, and Israeli-American architect Moshe Safdie was engaged to design the campus.

In 1996, the Skirball Cultural Center, separately incorporated, opened to the public, with Herscher as founding president and chief executive. The Center attracted some 300,000 visitors in its first year, and an ambitious expansion of its facilities, programs, and endowment ensued. By 2005, it had become one of the world's major Jewish cultural institutions. In 2013, the Skirball employed 169 full-time staff, operated on an $18 million annual budget, and managed a $150 million endowment.

In 2020, Herscher retired as president and CEO of the Skirball Center.

== Personal ==
In 1990, Herscher married Dr. Myna Herscher, a clinical psychologist. The couple have four sons from previous marriages: Adam Coleite, Aron Coleite, Gideon Herscher, and Josh Herscher.

== Publications ==
- Herscher, Uri D. On Jews, America, and Immigration (American Jewish Archives).
- Herscher, Uri D. Jewish Agricultural Utopias in America (Wayne State University Press).
- Herscher, Uri D. A Century of Memories, 1882–1982: The Eastern European Experience in America (American Jewish Archives).
- Herscher, Uri D. Queen City Refuge (Behrman House).

In addition, Herscher's articles and reviews have appeared in more than thirty academic journals devoted to ethnic studies, sociology, and Jewish history and religion.

== Awards and honors ==
- Member, Los Angeles City Ethics Commission, 2001-2006.
- "50 Influential Rabbis," Newsweek, 2009.
- Honorary degree, Hebrew Union College
- Honorary degree, University of Southern California
- Honorary degree, University of Judaism
