= Gindling Hilltop Camp =

Coordinates: 34.059895°N 118.964225°W

- Camp
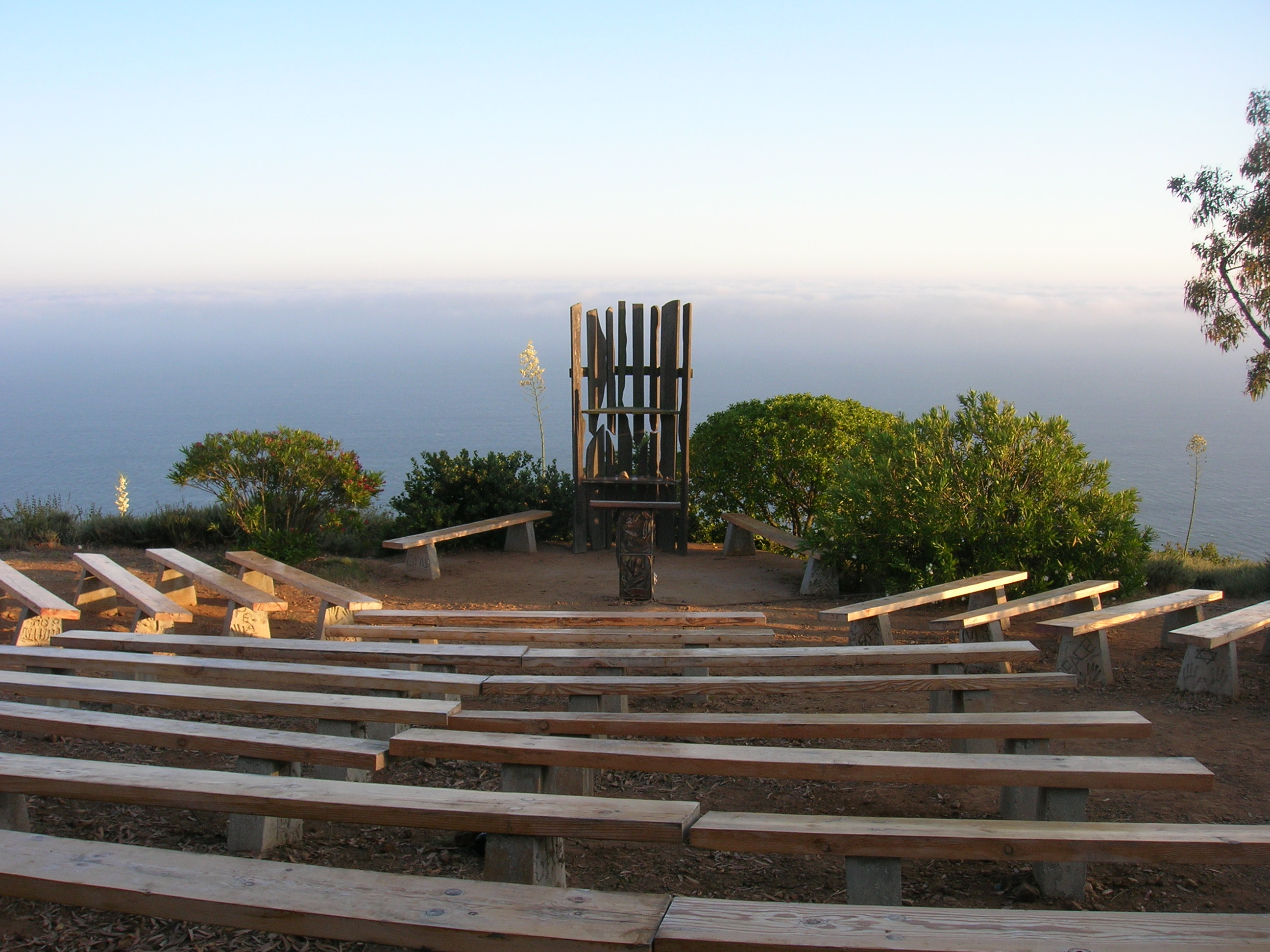
- Nicknames: Hilltop, GHC
- Interactive map of Gindling Hilltop Camp
- Website: www.wbtcamps.org

Gindling Hilltop Camp is a Jewish summer camp administered by Wilshire Boulevard Temple in Malibu, California in Little Sycamore Canyon between the Santa Monica Mountains and the Pacific Ocean on a coastal ridge, 750 feet above sea level. The camp serves approximately 120 campers, ages 7–15, and has a staff of about 40. Gindling Hilltop has been described as "the prototype for the American Jewish youth camping movement".

Hilltop and its sister camp, Camp Hess Kramer, are run by Wilshire Boulevard Temple Camps, an organization associated with the Union for Reform Judaism. The director of WBTC supervises both camps, but Hilltop is run on a day-to-day basis by a residential director. The camp's staff is made up of camp counselors, activity specialists, religious educators, supervisors (for programming, counselors, and counselors-in-training), and health personnel.

== History ==
Gindling Hilltop Camp was opened 1968 as a sister camp to Camp Hess Kramer because enrollment at Hess Kramer had become too high. The camp is named after Albert Gindling who worked on several of the Hess Kramer facilities. Camp Hess Kramer was the site of the Chicano Youth Leadership Conference (CYLC). The conference was founded in 1963 by Sal Castro, a teacher at Lincoln High School> The annual three-day event was designed to inspire and motivate Chicano students in LAUSD high schools.

Actors Zachary Gordon and Alden Ehrenreich are among the camp's alumni. Another notable alumni is singer-songwriter Alec Benjamin. The camp was destroyed on November 9, 2018 by the Woolsey Fire; as of early 2019, they were still in the process of rebuilding the camp. In the summer of 2019, the Wilshire Boulevard Temple Camps temporarily relocated to California State University Channel Islands.

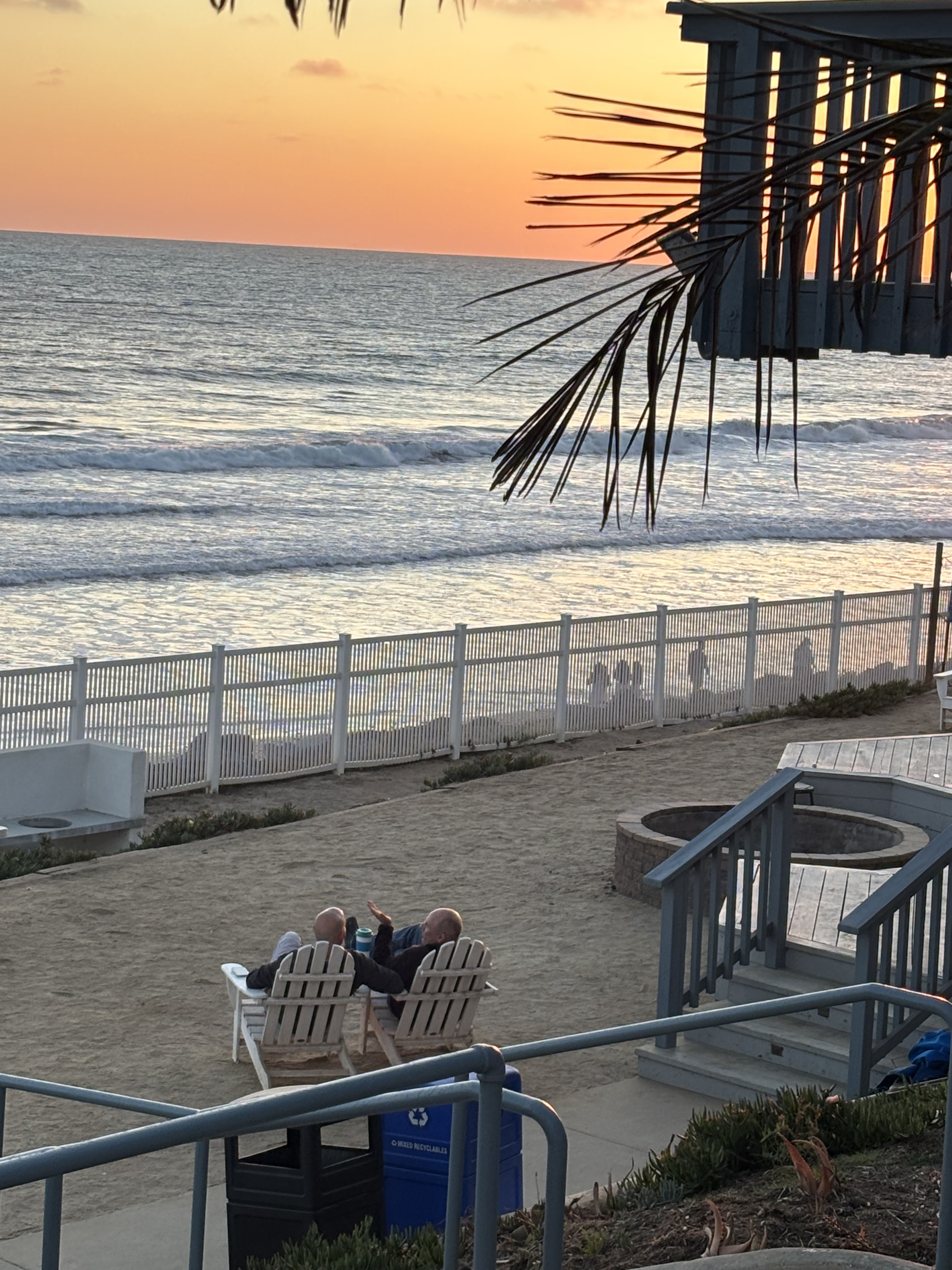
Sunset in Carlsbad

In 2020, the camp's summer was spent on zoom, free of charge. In 2021, 2022, and 2023, the camp was located at Buckhorn Camp in Idyllwild, California. The camp is currently located at the Army and Navy Academy in Carlsbad, CA.
