= When the Party's Over =

- DVD cover
- Directed by: Matthew Irmas
- Written by: Matthew Irmas; Ann Wykoff
- Starring: Elizabeth Berridge; Sandra Bullock; Rae Dawn Chong; Kris Kamm; Brian McNamara; Fisher Stevens
- Cinematography: Alice Webber
- Edited by: Jerry Bixman; Dean Goodhill
- Production company: Emby Eye
- Distributed by: Strand Distribution
- Release dates: April 1992 (WorldFest-Houston); March 12, 1993 (United States)
- Running time: 110 minutes
- Country: United States
- Language: English
- Budget: $600,000
- Box office: $3,514

When the Party's Over is a 1992 American comedy drama film directed by Matthew Irmas and starring Sandra Bullock.

== Plot ==
Frankie, Amanda, MJ, and Banks are housemates fresh out of college. Frankie is a social worker who is dating Taylor, a lawyer. Amanda, an artist, meets and falls in love with Alexander Midnight, a performance artist. She is also trying to guide her younger brother, Willie, after the death of their mother. The third roommate, MJ, is a stockbroker, who is promiscuous and has a penchant for drinking. She sleeps with Taylor, betraying Frankie. The final housemate, Banks, is an actor who is gay and best friends with Amanda.

The movie follows a group of twenty-somethings in California in the early 1990s, highlighting social issues such as excessive drinking, homosexuality, rape, infidelity, and problems with trust.

== Cast ==
- Sandra Bullock as Amanda
- Rae Dawn Chong as M.J.
- Kris Kamm as Banks
- Fisher Stevens as Alexander Midnight
- Elizabeth Berridge as Frankie
- Brian McNamara as Taylor
- Paul Johansson as Henry
- Michael Landes as Willie
- Raymond Cruz as Mario
- John Goddard as Graham

== Release ==
The film premiered at the Worldfest-Houston in 1992 and was released in the United States on March 12, 1993.

== Reception ==
Critical reception for When the Party's Over was mostly positive, and Allmovie rated the film at three stars. The Los Angeles Times was more positive, writing that it "transcends the conventional plot and brings the characters alive in this engaging tale of struggling housemates."
