= Alfred Wolf (rabbi) =

German-born American rabbi

- Born: 1915; Eberbach, Germany
- Died: August 1, 2004 (aged 88–89); Los Angeles, California, U.S.
- Occupation: Rabbi
- Spouse: Miriam Wolf
- Children: 2 sons, 1 daughter

Alfred Wolf (1915–2004) was a German-born American rabbi.

== Early life ==
Alfred Wolf was born in 1915 in Eberbach, Germany. He attended a Hebrew seminary in Berlin and went to the Hebrew Union College in Ohio on a student exchange program. As the Nazis had come to power, Wolf decided to stay in the United States. He became a naturalized United States citizen in 1941. Later that year, he sponsored his parents to emigrate to the United States on visas.

== Career ==
Wolf served as a rabbi in Dothan, Alabama from 1941 to 1946. He served as the director of the Union for Reform Judaism from 1946 to 1949.

Wolf became a rabbi at the Wilshire Boulevard Temple, a Reform synagogue in Los Angeles, California, from 1949 to 1985. During his tenure, he promoted inter-faith dialogue, even meeting Pope John Paul II in 1987. Additionally, he established summer camps for Jewish children on the West coast. As early as 1952, he established Camp Hess Kramer in Malibu, California.

Wolf co-founded the Inter-Religious Council of Southern California in 1969. He served as its founding president. During the 1984 Summer Olympics, he made sure the organizers added a mosque for Muslim athletes.

Wolf served as the founding director of the Skirball Institute on American Values, a program of the American Jewish Committee founded by Jack H. Skirball, from 1985 to 1996.

== Personal life ==
Wolf had a wife, Miriam. They had two sons, Dan and David, and a daughter, Judy Wolf Lee, who predeceased him in 1987.

== Death ==
Wolf died on August 1, 2004, at the Kaiser Permanente Medical Center in Los Angeles, California. He was eighty-eight years old.
