= Brenda Levin =

American architect

Brenda A. Levin is a Los Angeles-based architect and advocate for historic preservation. A Fellow of the American Institute of Architects (AIA), her major projects include the restoration of Los Angeles landmarks like the Bradbury Building, the Griffith Observatory, the Wiltern Theatre, City Hall, Grand Central Market, and Dodger Stadium.

Levin was born in New Jersey. She studied graphic design at Carnegie Mellon and New York University, and architecture at the Harvard Graduate School of Design. She moved to Los Angeles in 1976 and worked for architect John Lautner for two years. Her first project in Los Angeles, through the firm Group Arcon, was the renovation of the James Oviatt Building on Olive Street after it was purchased by developer Wayne Ratkovich. This was the first of many projects with Ratkovich that included the Wiltern theater, the Chapman Market, the Fine Arts Building, and the Hercules Campus. She opened her firm, Levin & Associates, in 1980.

== Awards ==
In 2015, Levin & Associates was among the team to receive a Presidential Honoree by the AIA Los Angeles. The team was recognized for Building Team of the Year: The Hercules Campus at Playa Vista, Los Angeles. Other team members included: The Ratkovich Company, Nabih Youssef & Associates, ARC Engineering, Galvin Preservation Associates EPT Design, Spectra Company, and Ross Project Management.

Additional awards include:

- 2014 recipient of the Los Angeles Parks Foundation's Rose Award
- 2010 recipient of the Gold Medal Presidential Award from AIA Los Angeles.
- 2008 12th Parkinson Spirit of Urbanism Award, University of Southern California's (USC) School of Architecture's Architectural Guild
