= Wilshire Boulevard Temple =

Reform synagogue in Los Angeles, California

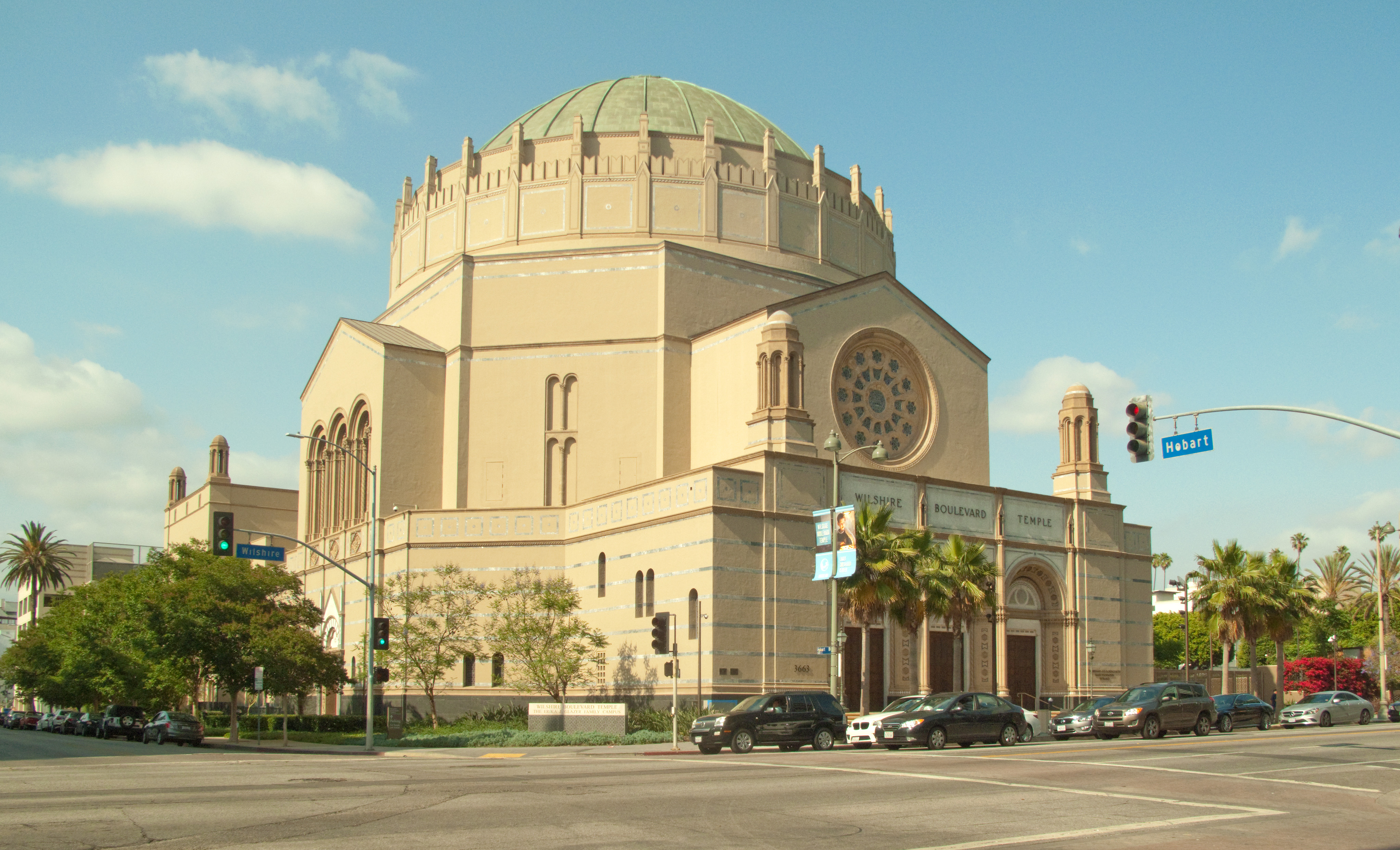
- The synagogue building, in 2017

- Location in Los Angeles, California

Religion
- Affiliation: Reform Judaism
- Ecclesiastical or organisational status: Synagogue
- Leadership: Senior Rabbi Joel Nickerson; Senior Cantor Lisa Peicott; Rabbi Elissa Ben-Naim; Rabbi David Eshel; Cantor Aliya Stuart; Rabbi Susan Nanus; Rabbi Joel Nickerson; Rabbi Joel Simonds; Rabbi Hannah Elkin
- Status: Active
- Notable artworks: Hugo Ballin murals

Location
- Location: 3663 Wilshire Boulevard, Los Angeles, California
- Country: United States
- Coordinates: 34°3′44″N 118°18′17″W

Architecture
- Architects: Abram M. Edelman; Samuel Tilden Norton
- Type: Synagogue architecture
- Style: Gothic Revival (1873); Victorian (1896); Byzantine Revival (1928)
- Founder: Joseph Newmark
- General contractor: Herbert M. Baruch Corporation
- Established: 1862 (as a congregation)
- Completed: 1873 (Temple and Broadway); 1896 (9th and Hope); 1928 (Wilshire Boulevard)
- Construction cost: $1.5 million

Specifications
- Capacity: 1,300 worshipers (sanctuary); 400 worshipers (balcony)
- Dome: One
- Dome height (outer): 135 feet (41 m)
- Dome dia. (outer): 100 feet (30 m)

Website
- wbtla.org
- Congregation B'nai B'rith
- U.S. National Register of Historic Places
- Los Angeles Historic-Cultural Monument
- NRHP reference No.: 81000154
- LAHCM No.: 116

Significant dates
- Added to NRHP: 21 December 1981
- Designated LAHCM: March 21, 1973

The Wilshire Boulevard Temple, known from 1862 to 1933 as Congregation B'nai B'rith, is a Reform Jewish congregation and synagogue at 3663 Wilshire Boulevard, in the Wilshire Center neighborhood of Los Angeles, California, United States. Founded in 1862, it is the oldest Jewish congregation in Los Angeles.

The congregation's main building, with a sanctuary topped by a large Byzantine Revival dome and decorated with interior murals, was designated as a City of Los Angeles Historic Cultural Monument in 1973 and was listed on the National Register of Historic Places in 1981. The Moorish-style building was completed in 1929 and was designed by architect Abram M. Edelman. (Note: Abram M. Edelman is a son of the congregation's first rabbi, Abram Wolf Edelman.)

The Wilshire Boulevard Temple is one of the largest Jewish congregations in Los Angeles, and has been led by several influential rabbis. Edgar Magnin has been described as the "John Wayne" of rabbis, and served for 69 years, from 1915 to 1984.

In 1998 the congregation opened a second campus on the Westside, following relocations among its people. Despite repeated reports that the congregation might sell its older, landmark building in what had become known as the Koreatown neighborhood, the temple began extensive renovations of the historic facility in 2008; and the remodelled sanctuary reopened in 2013.

The Audrey Irmas Pavilion, a major 55,000-square-foot (5,100 m^{2}) expansion adjacent to the synagogue, was completed between 2018 and 2021, designed by Shohei Shigematsu from the Office of Metropolitan Architecture, a leading global architectural firm.

== History ==
=== Early years ===
Wilshire Boulevard Temple traces its origins to the first Jewish worship service in Los Angeles, held in 1851. In 1862, a small community of Los Angeles Jews received its charter from the state to found Congregation B'nai B'rith. Worship was led by founder and layman, Joseph Newmark, until Abraham Wolf Edelman was hired in 1862 as the first rabbi. Long overshadowed by the more prosperous San Francisco Jewish community, L.A.'s Jews commissioned the congregation's first building, an impressive brick Gothic Revival style synagogue built in 1873 at the corner of Second Street and Broadway in downtown Los Angeles. It was described by the Los Angeles Star as “the most superior church edifice in Southern California.”

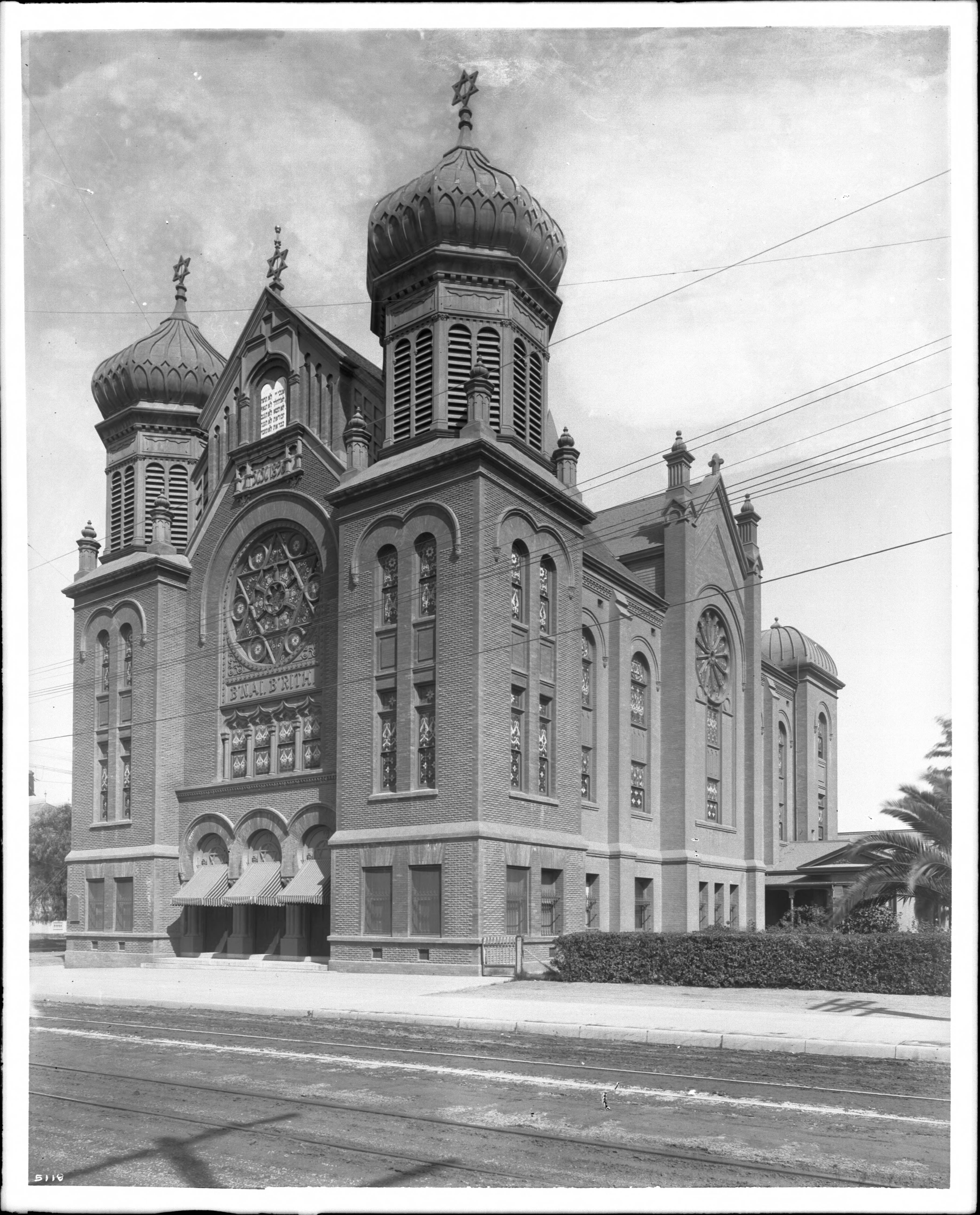
Second B'nai B'rith Synagogue, built in 1896

By 1885 much of the congregation was pushing to move away from Orthodox practice, and Rabbi Edelman eventually resigned. Ephraim Schreiber was hired as rabbi in 1885 and adopted some reforms, but soon left. Abraham Blum was hired in 1889, but was forced out in 1895 and replaced by Moses G. Solomon.

In 1896, the B'nai B'rith congregation moved to a larger brick Victorian synagogue at 9th and Hope. It was also designed by Abram M. Edelman, and had tall flanking towers capped with large onion domes.

Sigmund Hecht became rabbi in 1899. In 1903, the congregation joined the Union of American Hebrew Congregations, the national organization of the Reform movement. Edgar Magnin was hired as an assistant rabbi in 1915, and took over as senior rabbi upon Hecht's retirement in 1919. Both Hecht and Magnin implemented the Reform practices of the time, including wider use of the English language in services, and introducing organ and choir music.

=== Rabbi Magnin and the move to Wilshire Boulevard ===
The current Wilshire Boulevard Temple opened in 1929, built among other significant places of worship in the Wilshire Center area. The new temple was the dream of Rabbi Edgar Magnin who, over a career of seven decades, forged a Jewish identity for Los Angeles that joined pioneers and Hollywood moguls. Known as the "Rabbi to the stars", Magnin championed a new synagogue building from when he first served as an assistant rabbi.

After World War I, Hollywood moviemakers became more involved in the congregation and Magnin was promoted to senior rabbi in 1919; the building project proceeded. While most of the Jewish Hollywood producers were relatively secular New Yorkers with marginal religious interest, they were attracted to Magnin's vision of a popular modern Judaism. Rabbi Magnin also saw that the city was developing to the west, especially its Jewish population. The Wilshire Boulevard Temple was both typical and prescient in anticipating the increased suburbanization of American Jewish life. Because the new synagogue was beyond the "car line," it presaged L.A.'s near-total dependence on the automobile. Such an urban-suburban transformation did not affect many Jewish communities until after World War II.

The artistic highlights of the new temple include the Biblically themed Warner Memorial Murals, painted by Hugo Ballin and commissioned by the Warner Brothers (who founded the movie studio of the same name), Jack, Harry, and Albert. Ballin's murals consist of 320-foot-long (98 m), 7-foot-tall (2.1 m) murals depicting key moments in Jewish history. The murals are atypical of Judaism's traditional avoidance of figurative synagogue art. In deciding to include murals in the new temple, Magnin was inspired by his recent visits to great European cathedrals; the particular role of Los Angeles as the capital of the movie industry; and archaeological discoveries of the time that suggested that ancient synagogues used figurative art. (Note: Examples of such discoveries were Beth Alpha and Dura-Europos synagogue.)

Modelled after Rome's Pantheon, the immense Byzantine Revival dome is 100 feet (30 m) in diameter; its top is 135 feet (41 m) above the street. Its base is flanked by 28 buttresses, or small towers, rising from the ring girder for support. Funding for the dome's interior decoration was donated by Irving Thalberg, production head of MGM studio. The prayer inscribed in Hebrew around the Oculus, at the apex of the interior coffered dome, is from the shm'a prayer, a centerpiece of all Jewish prayer services. The words read: Shm'a Yisroael, Adonoi Eloheinu, Adonaoi Echad; which translates to "Hear, O Israel, the Lord our God, the Lord is One."

Designed in the Gothic tradition by the Oliver Smith Studios of Pennsylvania, the Temple's distinctive rose window on the south wall of the sanctuary, and stained glass windows on the east and west walls, have been described as being among the finest examples of this art form in the United States. During the recent renovation, the rose window was removed and repaired at the Judson Studios in Los Angeles. The Rose Window depicts a Torah Scroll and a Star of David in the center, and symbols of the Twelve Tribes of Israel in the outer circle. The triple lancet windows on the east and west walls are each made up of some 5,000-6,000 pieces of glass and are the symbolic representation of the 12 tribes of Israel. Funding for the east and west lancet windows was donated by film producer and studio head Louis B. Mayer.

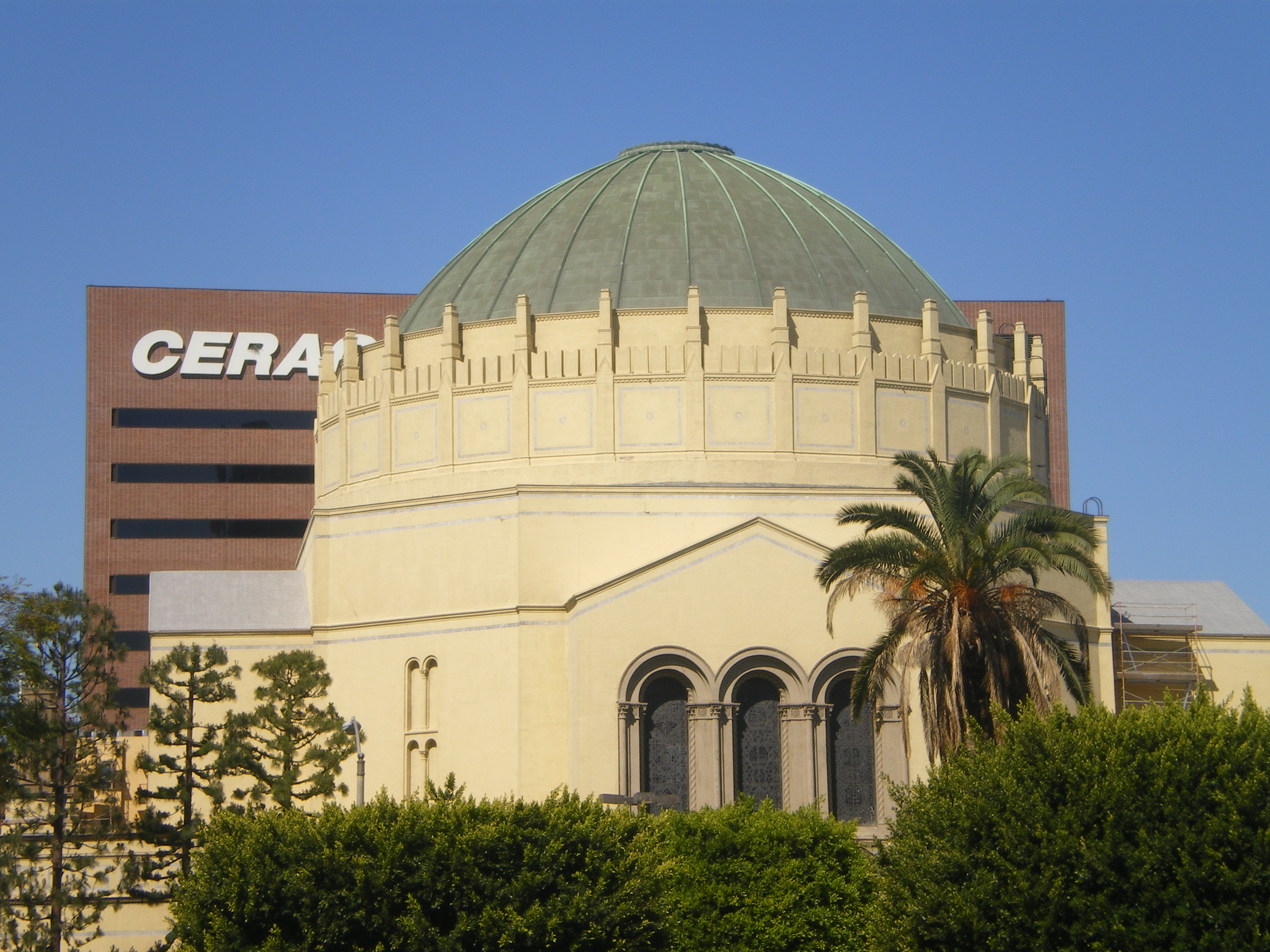
View of the temple and dome from the east

The Temple's immense dome immediately became a landmark in Wilshire Center and throughout Los Angeles. Its imposing marble columns were also a form of Hollywood magic: they are hollow columns of plaster painted to mimic marble. Unlike many synagogues, the temple has no center aisle, in part because the temple builders wanted it to have the openness of a movie theater.

The construction of the temple was completed by the Herbert M. Baruch Corporation and cost $1.5 million in 1929 dollars. It was dedicated in a three-day celebration in June 1929 presided over by Rabbi Magnin.

The congregation adopted its present name, Wilshire Boulevard Temple, in 1933. Magnin led the temple until his death in 1984, during which time he was widely considered as a spokesman on community and religious matters.

The block of Wilshire Boulevard where the temple sits was named Edgar F. Magnin Square in 1980 by the City of Los Angeles. In 1984, the Temple building was listed on the National Register of Historic Places for its architectural and historic significance.

=== Rabbi Fields and the Westside campus ===
One year after Rabbi Magnin's death, Harvey Fields became senior rabbi and led the congregation for 18 years. He reinstituted some traditional ritual practices that had not been used under Magnin. But he also increased the use of music, and the temple hired its first trained cantor.

Fields was founding chair of the Interfaith Coalition to Heal L.A. and "Hands Across L.A.", interfaith responses to the 1992 Los Angeles riots.

In response to membership growth on the Westside of Los Angeles, the temple built a second campus at Olympic Boulevard and Barrington Avenue in West Los Angeles. It opened in 1998 as the Audrey and Sydney Irmas Campus, with a new Jewish day school and other educational and community facilities. Despite repeated reports that the temple would leave its historic building, Rabbi Fields restated the congregation's commitment to the location.

Over the years the temple has hosted many notable speakers, dignitaries and singers, including the Dalai Lama, who received the Bodhi Award and addressed the American Buddhist Congress at the Wilshire Boulevard Temple in 1999.

=== Rabbi Leder and the main building ===
In July 2000, the J. Paul Getty Trust awarded a "Preserve L.A." grant to the temple as part of its effort to preserve the city's cultural heritage.

Rabbi Fields retired in 2003 and was succeeded by Steven Leder, who has served the temple's congregation since 1987. In 2004, the congregation celebrated the 75th anniversary of the historic structure on Wilshire Boulevard. As the area surrounding its historic building has changed dramatically (becoming part of the rapidly expanding Koreatown district), the temple faced the decision whether to sell the property and refocus its operations on the Westside, where most of Los Angeles' Jewish population had moved.

Instead, because of a desire to maintain its landmark facilities and commit to its surrounding community, and also noting a trend for younger Jews to move into neighborhoods further east (such as Los Feliz and Silver Lake), the congregation decided to begin a major restoration of the sanctuary and redevelopment of the surrounding city block. The renovations began in 2008 under the leadership of Senior Rabbi, Steven Z. Leder. The temple began working with architect Brenda Levin in 2005, developing an expansive master plan for what was envisioned as a campus, including a renovated synagogue, a new pre-school and elementary school, the Karsh Social Service Center, and athletic and community facilities. The renovation is documented in great detail in the film Restoring Tomorrow, directed by Aaron Wolf, a member of the temple and grandson to the late Alfred Wolf.

After the end of the 2011 High Holy Days, the auditorium was closed for a renovation project that lasted two years.

In 2013, philanthropist Erika Glazer pledged $30 million through 2028 for ongoing restoration and redevelopment of the synagogue. The Wilshire Center facility is now called the Erika J. Glazer Family Campus. The sanctuary reopened in September 2013 for Rosh Hashanah services. The temple has stated its intentions to provide community services for the non-Jewish, mainly Korean and Hispanic residents of the area, as well for the Jewish community. The community outreach has been recognized by local leaders, who hope it will become a model for other organizations as well.

In 2013, Judson Studios restored the sanctuary's neo-Gothic windows, the sculptor Lita Albuquerque designed a memorial wall and the artist Jenny Holzer crafted a series of benches.

In 2009 the temple and its rabbi, Steven Leder, became participants in the Rabbinic Vision Initiative (RVI). This group of rabbis from large Reform congregations became vocal critics of the Reform movement's central organization, the Union for Reform Judaism (URJ). In 2011, Wilshire Boulevard Temple resigned from the URJ in what was perceived as a protest of the organization's perceived ineffectiveness.

=== Audrey Irmas Pavilion ===
Audrey Irmas Pavilion
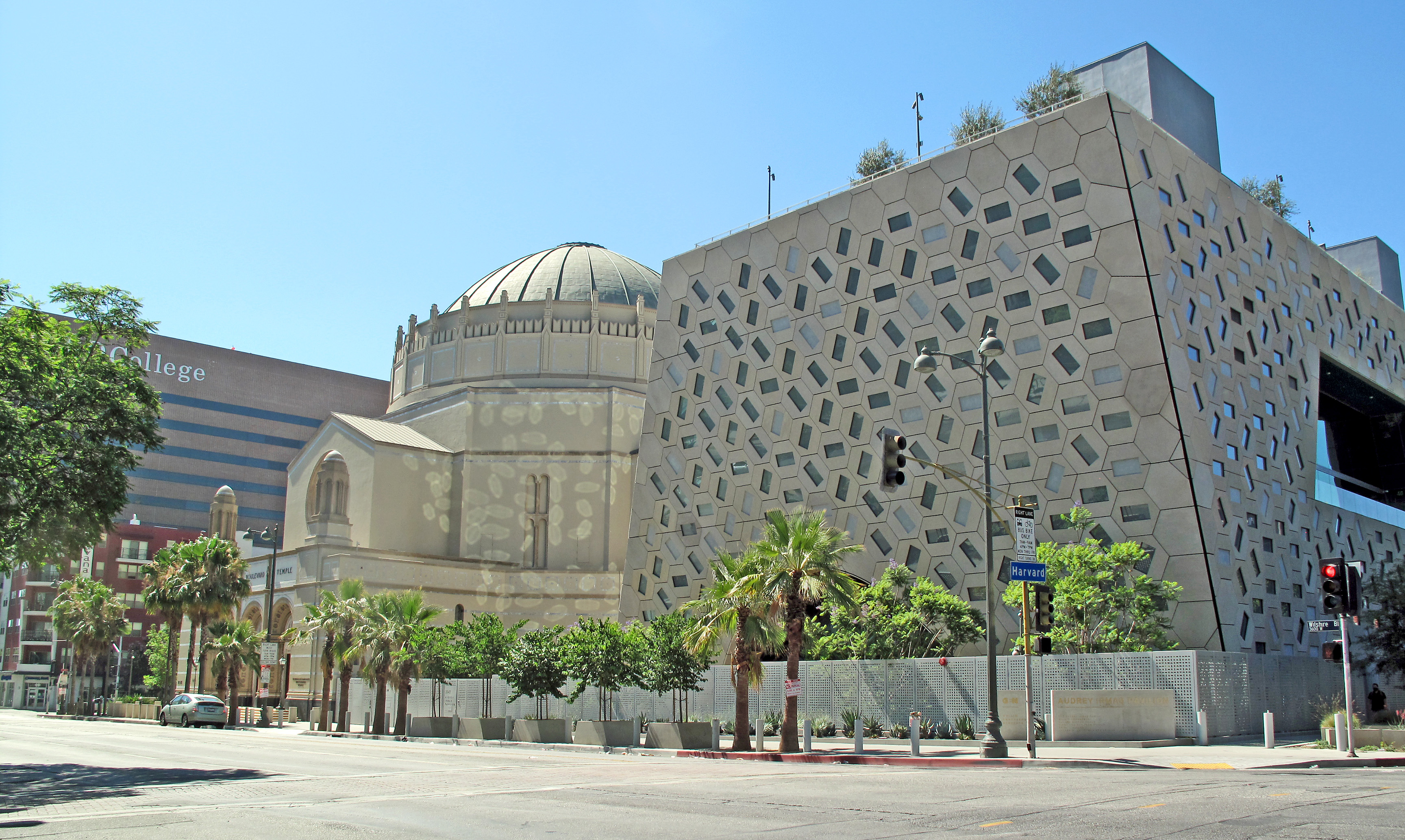
- The Audrey Irmas Pavilion located adjacent to the synagogue in 2022

General information
- Architectural style: Deconstructivism (attrib.) (Note: While not specifically recorded as such, the Office for Metropolitan Architecture is principally known for its deconstructivism projects under the direction of its founder, Rem Koolhaas.)
- Location: 3643 Wilshire Boulevard, Los Angeles, California 90010
- Coordinates: 34°03′42″N 118°18′16″W
- Completed: 2022
- Cost: $95 million

Technical details
- Floor count: Three
- Floor area: 55,000 square feet (5,100 m^{2})

Design and construction
- Architect: Shohei Shigematsu
- Architecture firm: Office for Metropolitan Architecture

Website
- audreyirmaspavilion.org

In 2015, more than a dozen architectural firms were considered for the Audrey Irmas Pavilion by a 15-person committee made up of congregation members, including philanthropists Glazer, Bruce Karatz, Eli Broad, and Anthony Pritzker. The committee whittled down 25 firms to four, whom Broad paid $100,000 each.

After four firms submitted detailed proposals, a design by Shohei Shigematsu, of the Office for Metropolitan Architecture's New York office, was selected for the $75 million structure. OMA New York proposed a trapezoidal five-story building including a rooftop garden, office spaces and a large, vaulted ground-level banquet hall to replace a parking lot next to the main building on Wilshire Boulevard.

The temple received a $30 million pledge from Audrey Irmas, after the $70.5 million sale of her Cy Twombly painting. Wallis Annenberg contributed $15 million to complete the pavilion and another $3 million on a third-floor, 7,000-square-foot cultural space (650 m^{2}) for older adults, called GenSpace.

The pavilion, which cost $95 million, was completed in 2022. Its façade features 1,230 hexagonal glass fiber reinforced concrete panels; each panel was set at a unique angle, and each contains a window that was set at a unique angle. The pavilion's ground floor featured a 14,000-square-foot event space (1,300 m^{2}), with a floor of polished red concrete. The second level contains a trapezoidal chapel and outdoor terrace. On the third floor, Mia Lehrer designed a circular sunken garden surrounded by walls painted an azure blue.

The building was "designed to host religious and cultural activities and performances...[with] three distinct gathering spaces that puncture through the building — a Grand Ballroom, a smaller Chapel/event space, and a sunken garden."

=== December 2025 pro-Palestinian protest ===
In December 2025, a lecture was held at Wilshire Boulevard Temple, which was intended to foster dialogue and share safety strategies between the Jewish, Israeli, and Korean communities. The lecture was violently disrupted when a group of protesters gathered outside chanting anti-Israel slogans, with several individuals infiltrating the event itself. Protesters inside the synagogue shouted slogans, with one smashing a glass vase and another yelling profanities, frightening the attendees. The groups involved were believed to include Nodutdol and Koreatown 4 Palestine. Los Angeles Mayor Karen Bass condemned the incident as abhorrent, and the Los Angeles Police Department arrested two people for battery and vandalism. Jewish communal organisations and the synagogue's rabbis denounced the attack as an act of antisemitism, emphasising the need for accountability, strengthened security, and communal solidarity.

== Rabbinical leaders ==
The following individuals have served as senior rabbi of Congregation B'nai B'rith:

Ordinal	Officeholder	Term start	Term end	Time in office	Notes
1	Abram Wolf Edelman	1862	1885	22–23 years	
2	Ephraim Schreiber	1885	1889	3–4 years	
3	Abraham Blum	1889	1895	5–6 years	
4	Moses G. Solomon	1895	1899	3–4 years	
5	Sigmund Hecht	1899	1919	19–20 years	
6	Edgar F. Magnin	1919	1984	64–65 years	
7	Alfred Wolf	1984	1985	0–1 years	
8	Harvey J. Fields	1985	2003	17–18 years	
9	Steve Leder	2003	2025	22–23 years	
10	Joel Nickerson	2025			

== Notable members ==
- Lawrence Bender
- Lowell Ganz
- Jami Gertz
- Maurice Kremer
- Tony Ressler
- Fred Sands
- Robert B. Sherman
- Daniel Steres (born 1990), professional soccer player with the LA Galaxy
- Jack L. Warner
- Bud Yorkin

== See also ==
- List of Registered Historic Places in Los Angeles
