= Audrey Skirball-Kenis =

American philanthropist (1914–2002)

- Born: Audrey Marx; December 19, 1914; Birmingham, Alabama, US
- Died: June 19, 2002 (aged 87); Century City, Los Angeles, California
- Occupation: Philanthropist
- Spouse(s): Jack Skirball (m. 1938; death 1985) Charles Kenis (m. 1987)
- Children: 4

Audrey Skirball-Kenis (December 19, 1914 – June 19, 2002) was an American philanthropist.

== Early years ==
A long-time horse racing fan, Audrey Skirball had joined with friends in 1972 to purchase a thoroughbred, then established the 3 Plus U Stable, which became quite successful. Charles Kenis joined his new wife in this pursuit and became a founder and eventually director emeritus of the Thoroughbred Owners of California.

== A.S.K. Theater Projects ==
Audrey and Charles founded the non-profit Audrey Skirball-Kenis Theater Projects (ASK) in West Los Angeles. Audrey did not actively manage ASK, but Charles served as president of ASK's board of trustees.

In 1990, Audrey and Charles, through ASK, made a highly publicized donation of $500,000 to the Los Angeles Arts Festival's theater and performance programs. The donation saved the festival from closing, and was ceremonially accepted in the Los Angeles mayor's office by Peter Sellers, the festival's director.

Soon, ASK emerged with a reputation as Los Angeles' primary funder of small new theatrical projects. In 2000, ASK spent and gave a total of $1.8 million to charitable activities.

== Death ==
Audrey Skirball-Kenis died on June 19, 2002, at age 87 in Los Angeles. She had two daughters, and two stepchildren. Charles Kenis died in Los Angeles on July 21, 2006.

== Sources ==
- Audrey Skirball-Kenis, Philanthropist, 87, Dies (Associated Press, June 25, 2002)
- Turmoil and uncertainty rock an L.A. art mainstay, L.A. Weekly, June 14–20, 2002
- "3 Plus U adds up to success". Thoroughbred Times.com. February 24, 2001. Archived from the original on October 7, 2007.
