= Matthew Irmas =

American director and producer

Matthew Irmas is an American director and producer. He made his directorial debut in 1992, with When the Party's Over, Variety then commenting that the film showed Irmas was "a director capable of handling low-budget, character-driven ensemble pieces. But the 36-year-old former Kings Road production executive wants more".

== Filmography ==
=== As actor ===
- King of the Underground (2011, as Donald)

=== As director ===
- When the Party's Over (1992, also producer)
- Edie & Pen (1996, also producer)
- Sleep Easy, Hutch Rimes (1996, also producer)
- A Carol Christmas (2003)

=== As producer only ===
- Three of Hearts (1993)
