= Rindge =

Rindge may refer to:

== People ==
- Frederick H. Rindge (1857—1905), American entrepreneur, philanthropist, and writer
- Frederick H. Rindge (entomologist) (fl. 1981), entomologist who named Nemeris sternitzkyi, a geometrid moth in the family Geometridae
- Rhoda May Knight Rindge (1864–1941), American businesswoman
- Rhoda Agatha Rindge Adamson (1893–1963), American businesswoman
- Rindge family, American entrepreneur family of British origins

== Other ==
- Rindge, New Hampshire, a town in Cheshire County, New Hampshire, U.S.
- Rindge Dam, a dam in Southern California, U.S.
- Rindge Railroad, another name for Hueneme, Malibu and Port Los Angeles Railway in Malibu, California, U.S.
- Rindge Towers, an affordable housing development in Cambridge, Massachusetts, U.S.
- Rindge Tract, an island in the Sacramento–San Joaquin River Delta, U.S.
- Cambridge Rindge and Latin School, a school in Cambridge, Massachusetts, U.S.

== See also ==
- Rindge Co. v. County of Los Angeles, 1923 US federal case
- Rindgenaria, genus of moths
- Rindgea, genus of butterflies
