= Rindge family =

American family

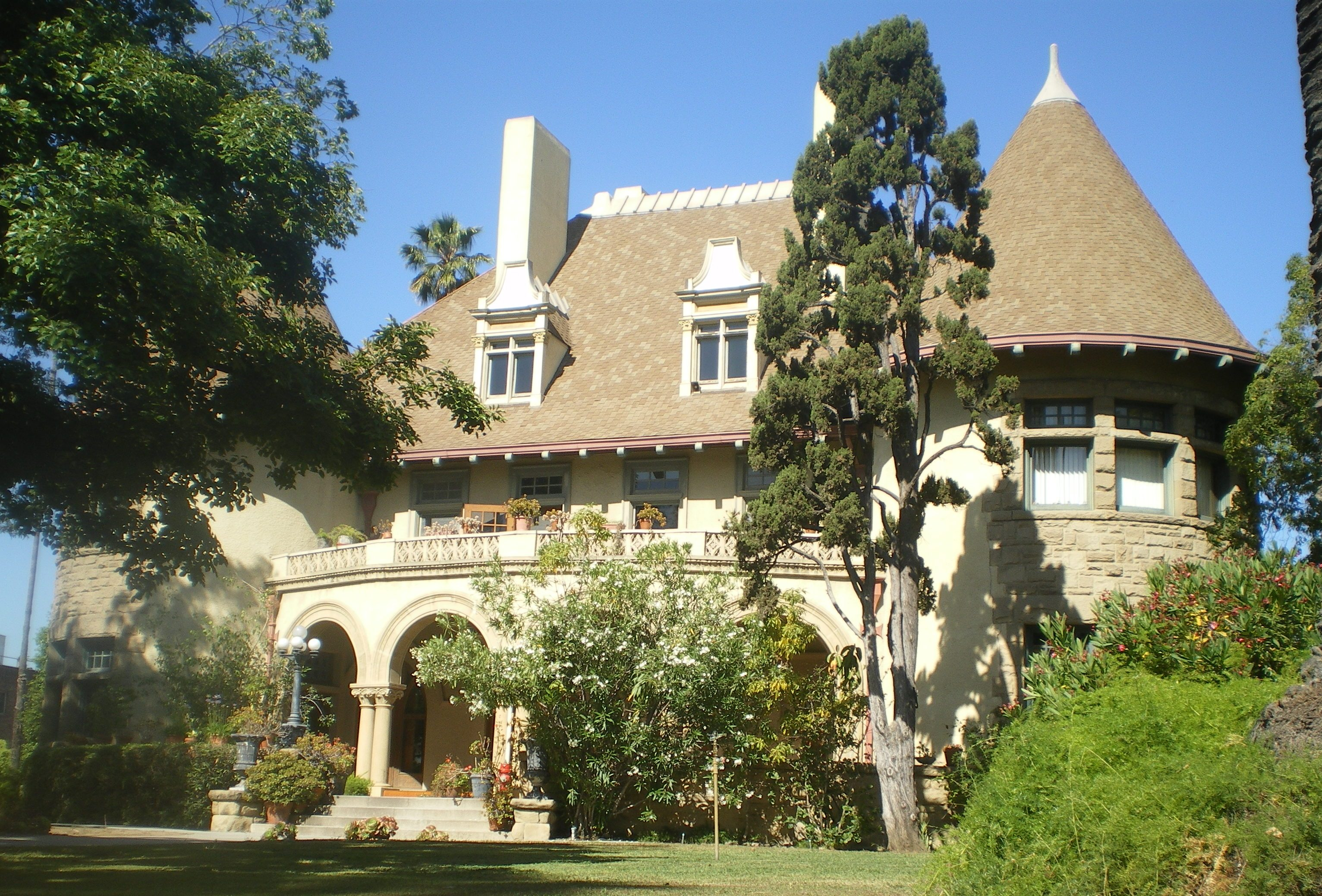
- Frederick Hastings Rindge House in 2008
- Current region: United States East and West Coast
- Origin: United Kingdom
- Members: Samuel Baker Rindge, Frederick Hastings Rindge
- Distinctions: Founding of Malibu, California; Union Oil; Pacific Mutual Insurance); real estate development; philanthropy (Pepperdine University Benefactors)
- Estates: Frederick Hastings Rindge House and Adamson House

The Rindge family is an American family of British origin that was financially successful in real estate, natural resource development, and insurance.

== History ==
The successes of the Rindge family began with the Cambridge, Massachusetts textile, shipping, and banking businesses of Mr. Samuel Baker Rindge (the father of Frederick Hastings Rindge). Ultimately the family expanded into various other areas of industry and philanthropy. Frederick Rindge, for example, built and donated parks, City Hall, and the Rindge Technical School in Cambridge, Massachusetts; the First Methodist Episcopal Church in Santa Monica, California; and was deeply involved in civic life, from writing meditative books to serving as vice president of Union Oil to serving as director of Edison Electric. The philanthropy continued through the family's lineage; for example, Rindge's daughter's family, the Adamsons, donated the first 138 acres of land for Pepperdine University's Malibu campus in 1968.

Mr. Samuel Baker Rindge's descendants, including his son Frederick Hastings Rindge, went on to build grand mansions in Malibu (the Rindge home that burned down in 1903 and the Rindge Castle that burned down in the 1970s), and in West Adams Heights, Los Angeles, California, (the Frederick Hastings Rindge House). Frederick and wife Rhoda May Knight Rindge's daughter, Rhoda Agatha, commissioned Malibu's Adamson House with her husband, Merritt Adamson.

The Rindge family fortune has been valued at US$700 million in 2016 dollars accounting for inflation and were close friends of the Roosevelt family.

== Southern California ==
The Rindge family moved west to Los Angeles, California, in 1887. In 1892 the Rindges purchased the 13,300-acre (54 km^{2}) Spanish land grant Rancho Topanga Malibu Sequit or "Malibu Rancho"; which is now present day Malibu, California. They later expanded it to 17,000 acres (69 km^{2}) as Rindge Ranch.

The Rindges founded the Conservative Life Insurance Company (now Pacific Life). The family patriarch, Frederick Hastings Rindge, was vice-president of Union Oil Company, and a director of the Los Angeles Edison Electric Company (later Southern California Edison Company). The Rindges' investments included land near Stockton, California, and real estate holdings in the San Fernando Valley of Los Angeles, and the state of Sinaloa, Mexico.

Similarly, the family patriarch Frederick Hastings Rindge was president of the Harvard Club of Los Angeles and a member of many historical, archaeological, patriotic, and religious organizations which mirrored his interests. A supporter of the temperance movement, Frederick Hastings Rindge reimbursed the city of Santa Monica for the loss of license fees when Santa Monica abolished saloons. He established the First Methodist Episcopal Church of Santa Monica and wrote several self-published books which were spiritual and meditative in nature.

== See also ==
- Rindge Dam
- Santa Monica Mountains National Recreation Area
- Malibu Potteries
- Rindge Co. v. County of Los Angeles 262 U.S. 700 (1923)
- Adamson House (section Rindge-Adamson family)
- Hueneme, Malibu and Port Los Angeles Railway (the railroad that the Rindges built through Malibu)
- Rindge Towers
- Cambridge Rindge and Latin School
- Rhoda May Knight Rindge
