= Frederick Hastings Rindge House =

Historic house in California, United States

- U.S. National Register of Historic Places
- Los Angeles Historic-Cultural Monument
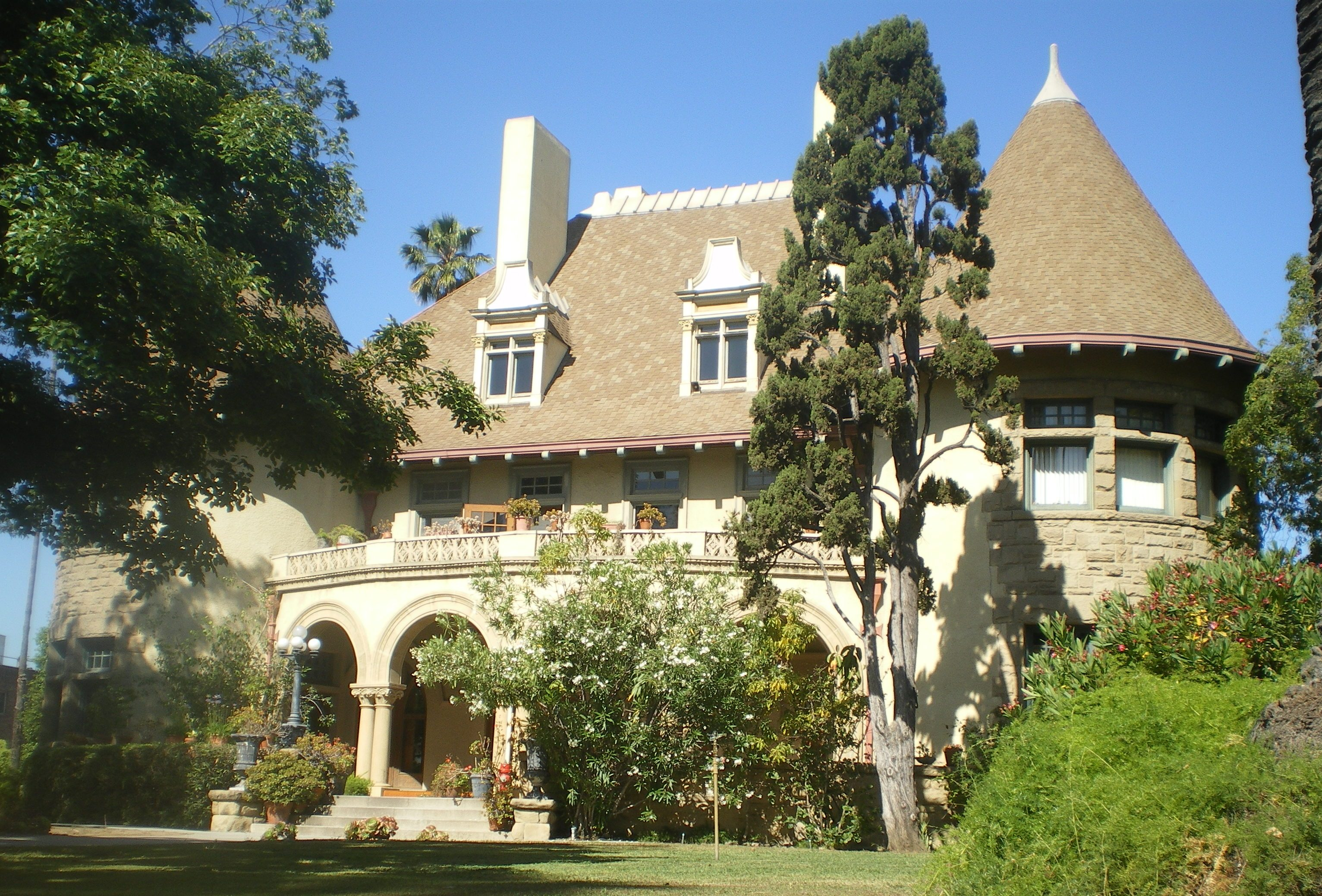
- Frederick Hastings Rindge House, 2008

- Location within the Los Angeles metropolitan area Location within California Location within the United States
- Location: 2263 Harvard Blvd., West Adams, Los Angeles
- Coordinates: 34°2′4″N 118°18′25″W
- Built: 1902
- Architect: Frederick Louis Roehrig; E. C. Shipley
- Architectural style: Romanesque Revival-Renaissance Revival-Victorian
- NRHP reference No.: 86000105
- LAHCM No.: 95

Significant dates
- Added to NRHP: January 23, 1986
- Designated LAHCM: February 23, 1972

Built in 1904, The Frederick Hastings Rindge House is a historic house located in the West Adams neighborhood of Los Angeles, California. In 1986, it was listed on the National Register of Historic Places.

== History ==
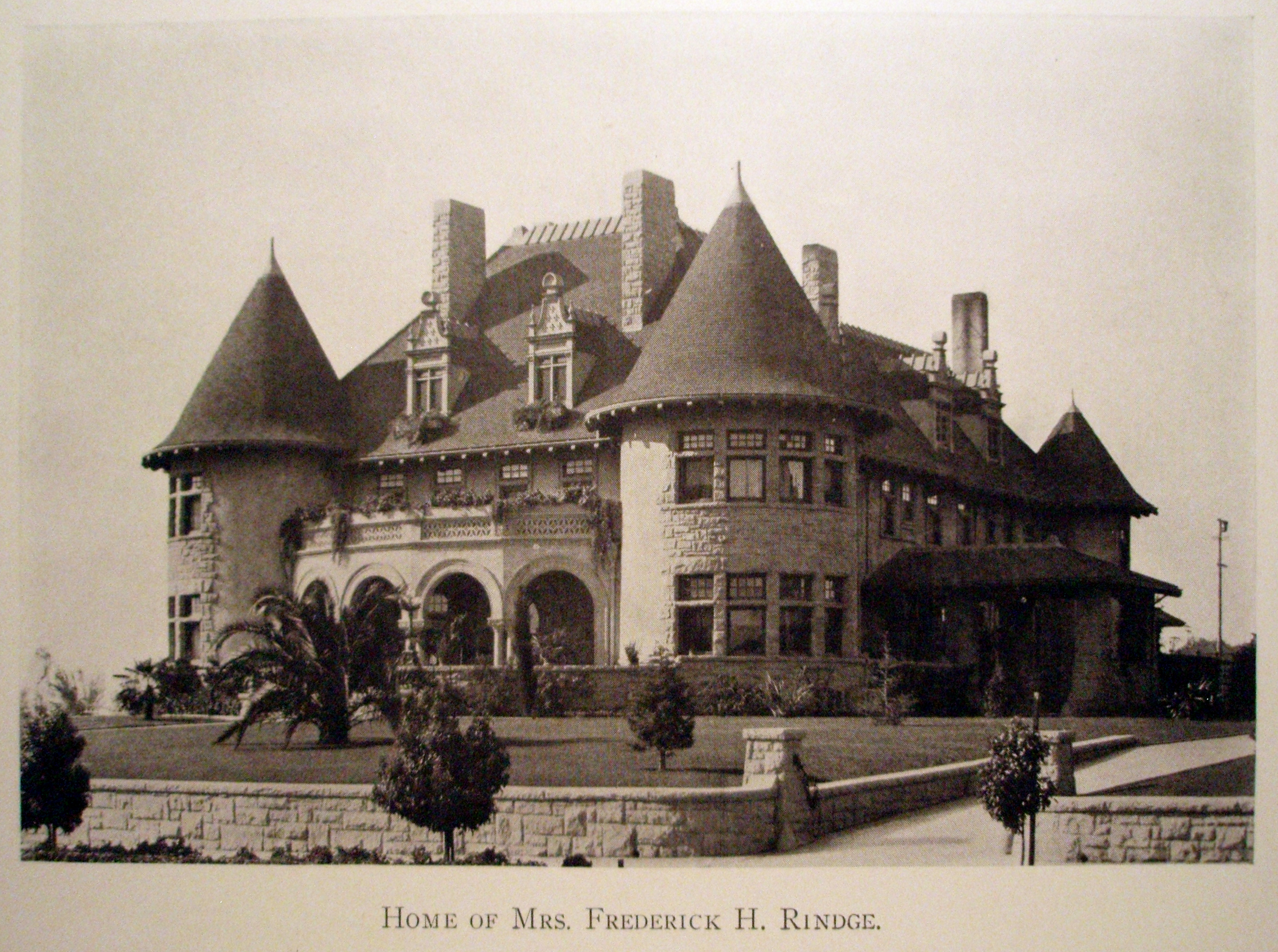
The House in 1910

The Rindge House was built in 1904 for Frederick H. Rindge and wife Rhoda May Knight Rindge and designed by Frederick Roehrig and E.C. Shipley in a Renaissance Revival-Romanesque Revival Victorian style. 1986, the Rindge House was listed on the National Register of Historic Places based on architectural criteria.

== Rindge Ranch ==
In 1892 Frederick H. Rindge purchased the 13,300-acre (5,400 ha) Spanish land grant Rancho Topanga Malibu Sequit or "Malibu Rancho". He later expanded it to 17,000 acres (6,900 ha)) as the Rindge Ranch, which encompasses present day Malibu, California, and Rhoda May ran it, its oil derrick, and railroad after Frederick's death, also founding the Rindge Dam, Malibu Potteries, and what became Serra Retreat.

== Gallery ==
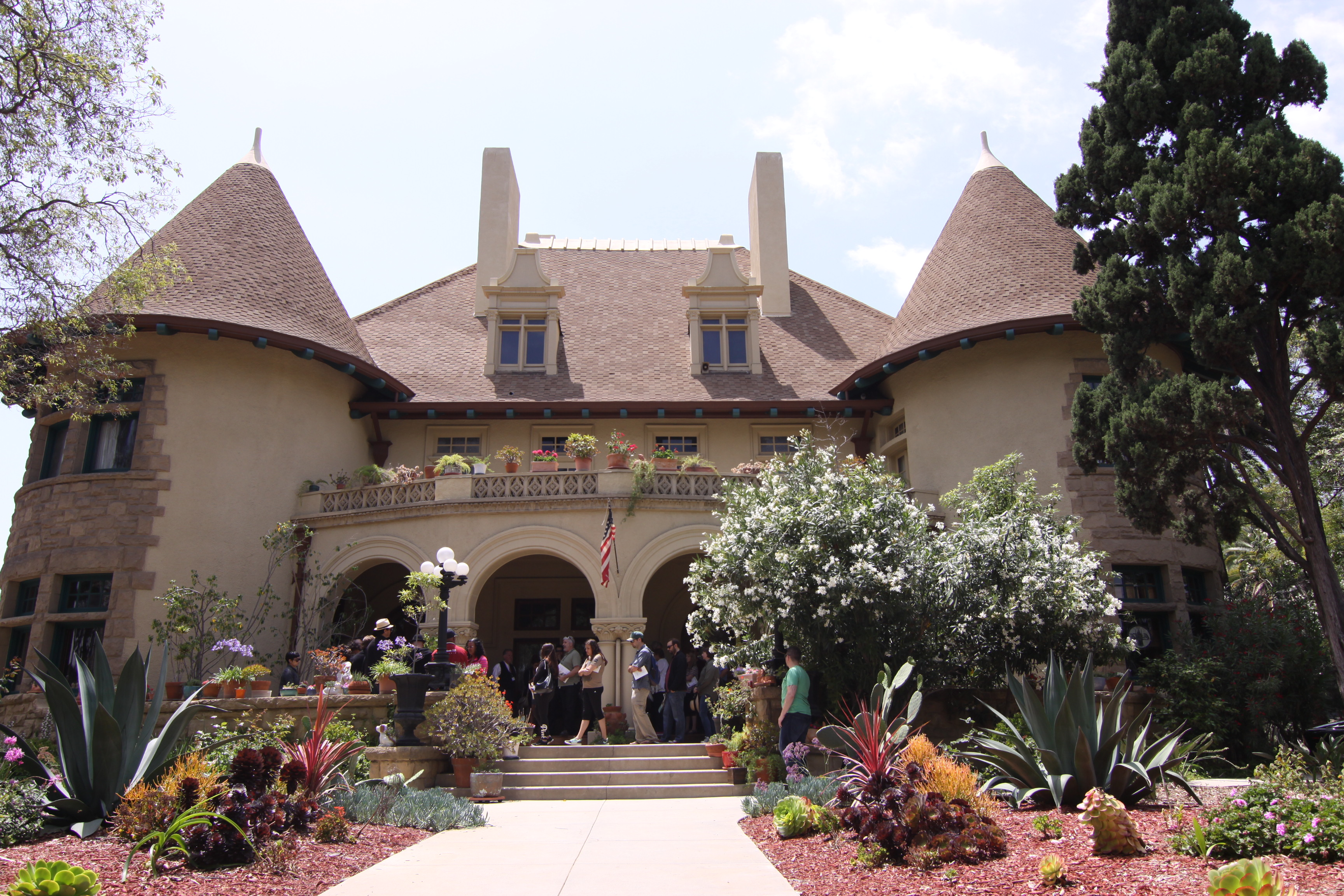
Front of the Rindge House in 2015.

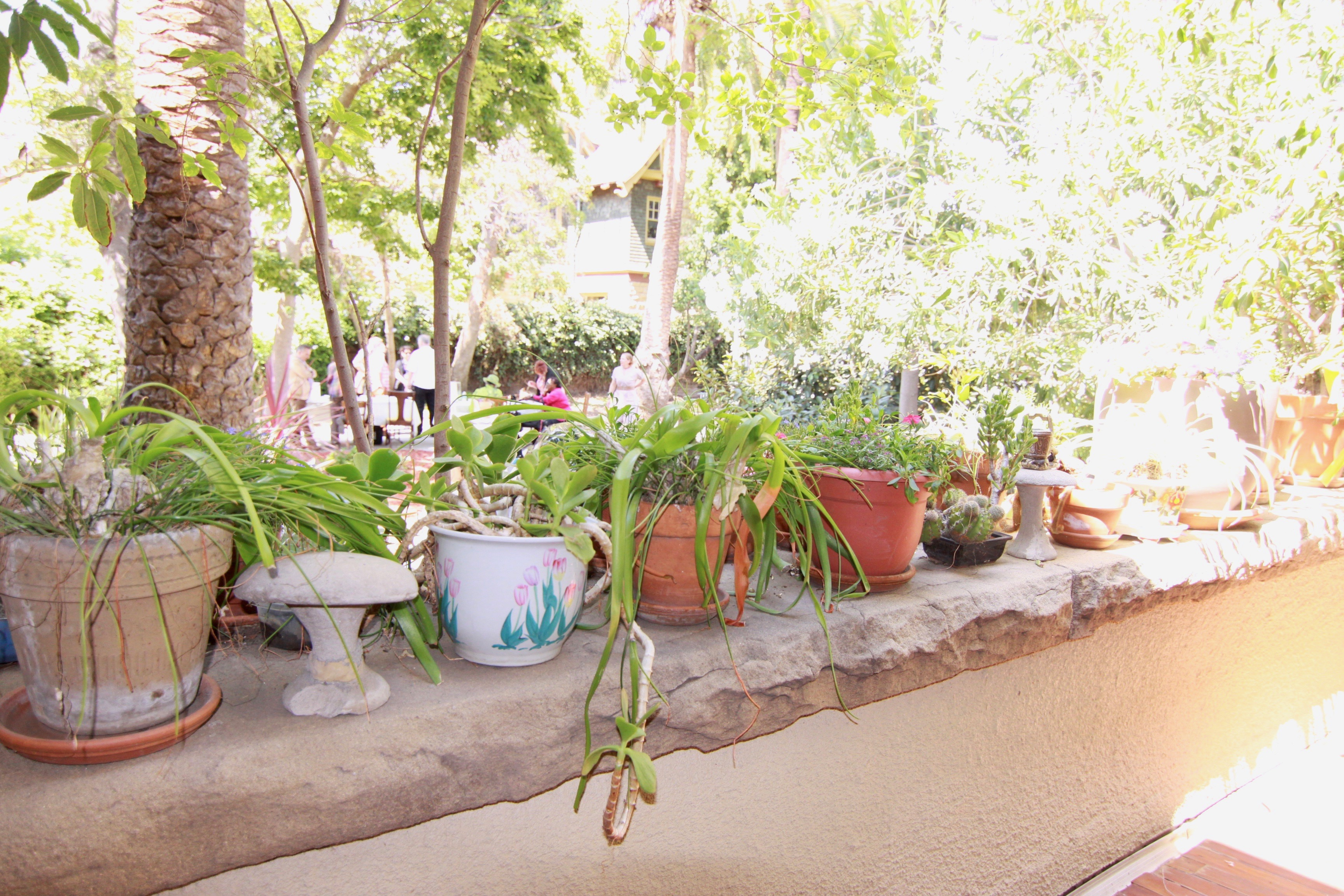
Numerous plants adorn the Rindge House retaining walls.

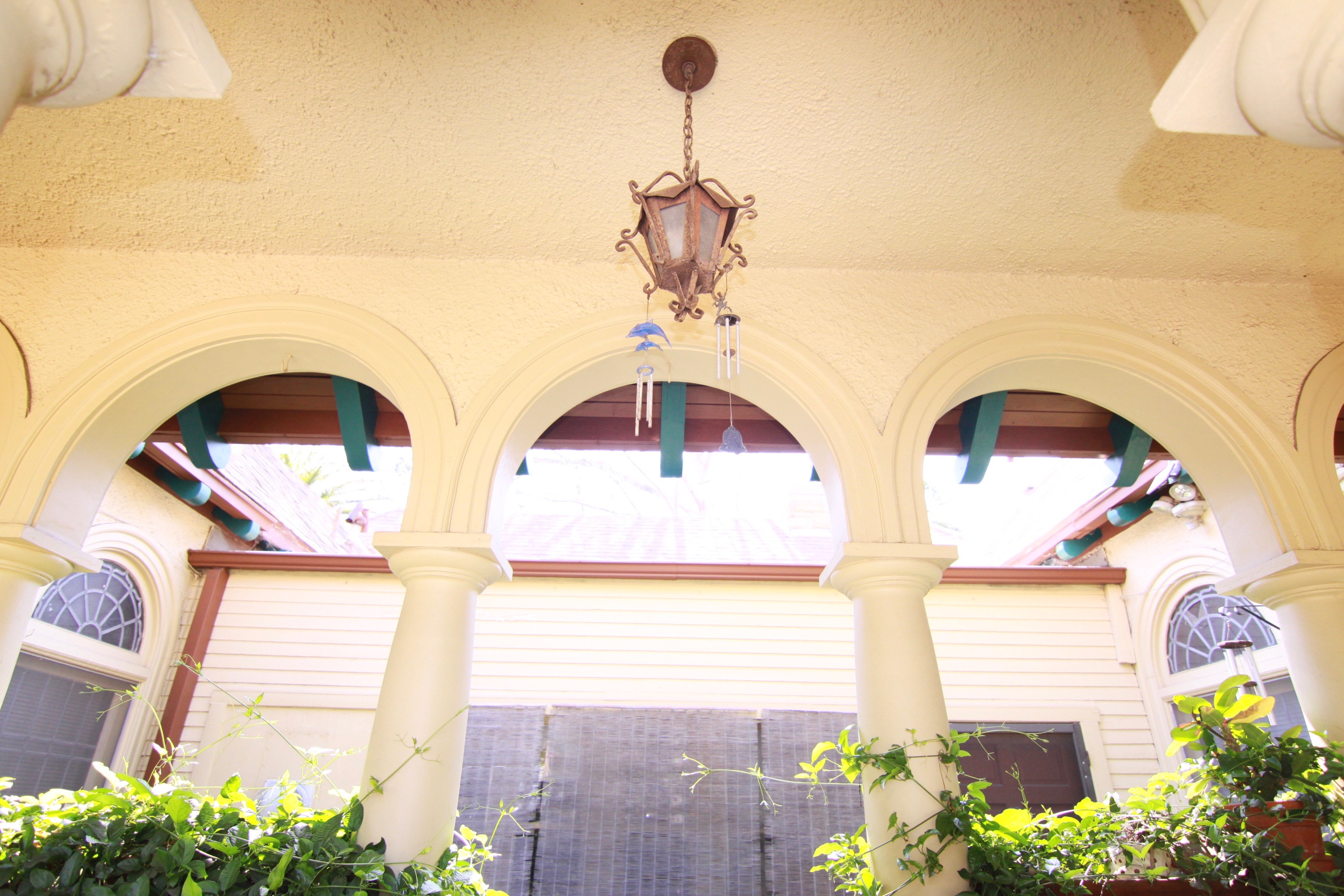
The Rindge House guesthouse.

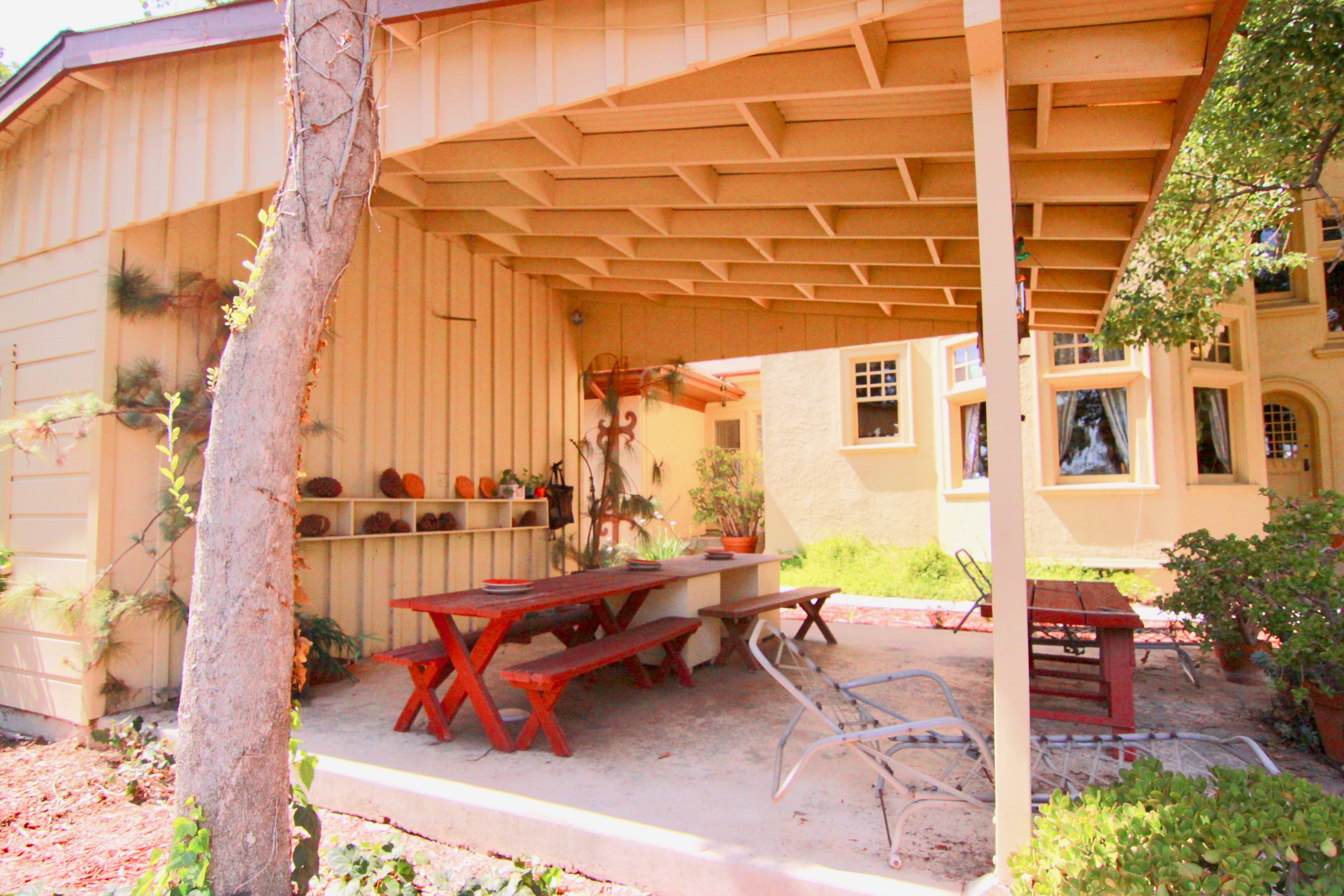
Rindge House outbuilding.

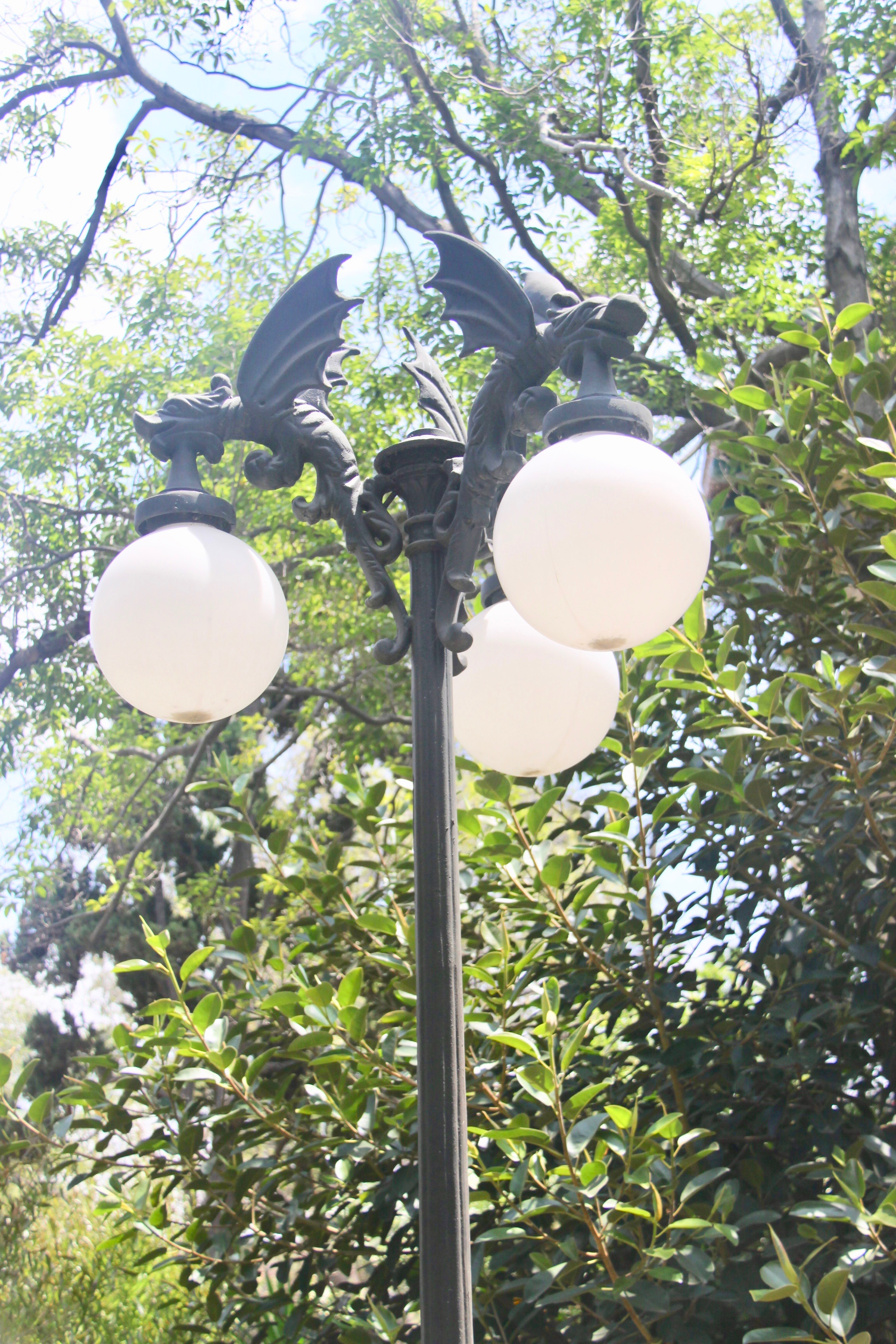
Dragon lamp at the Rindge House.

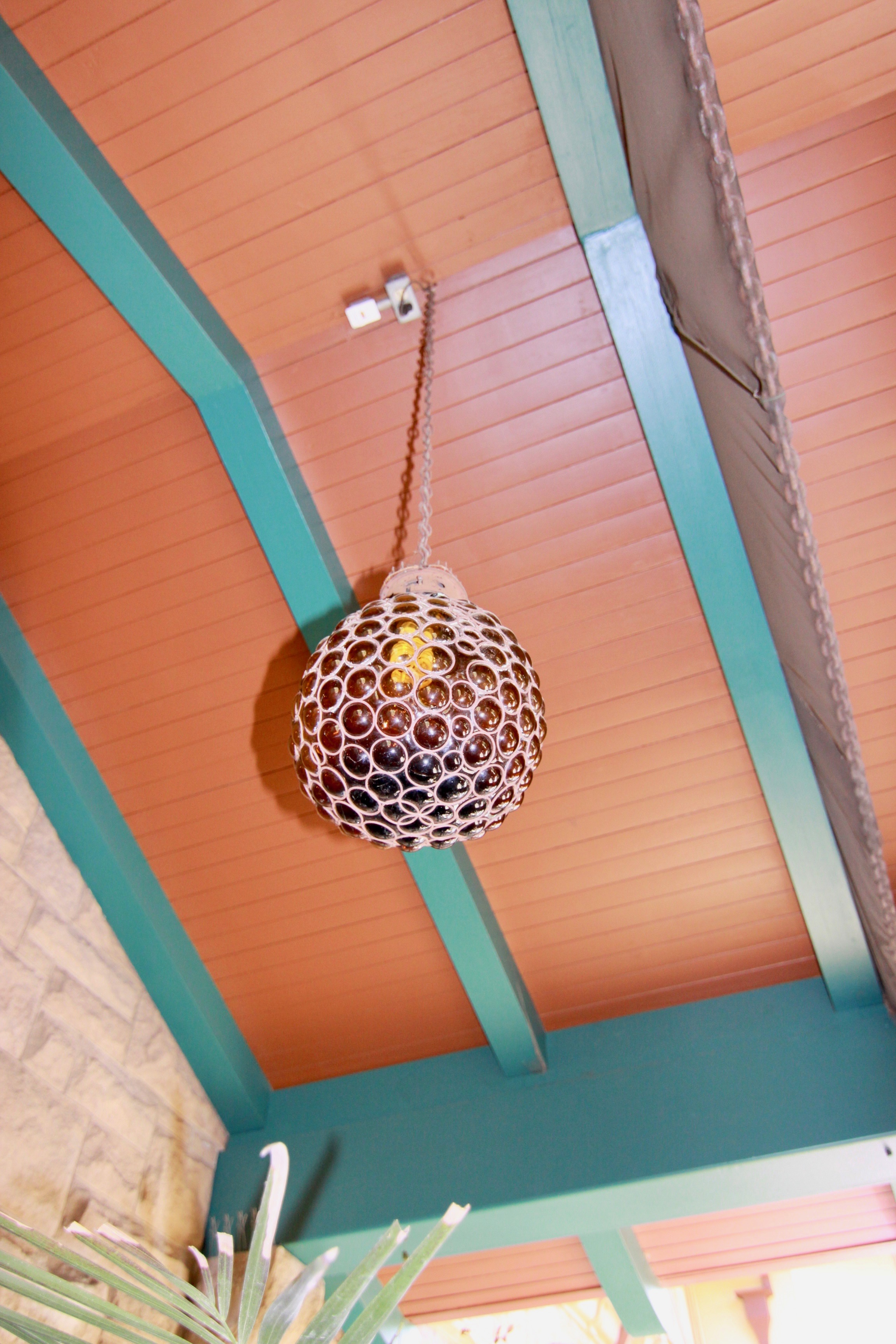
Amber glass lamp in the house's carriage drive-thru.

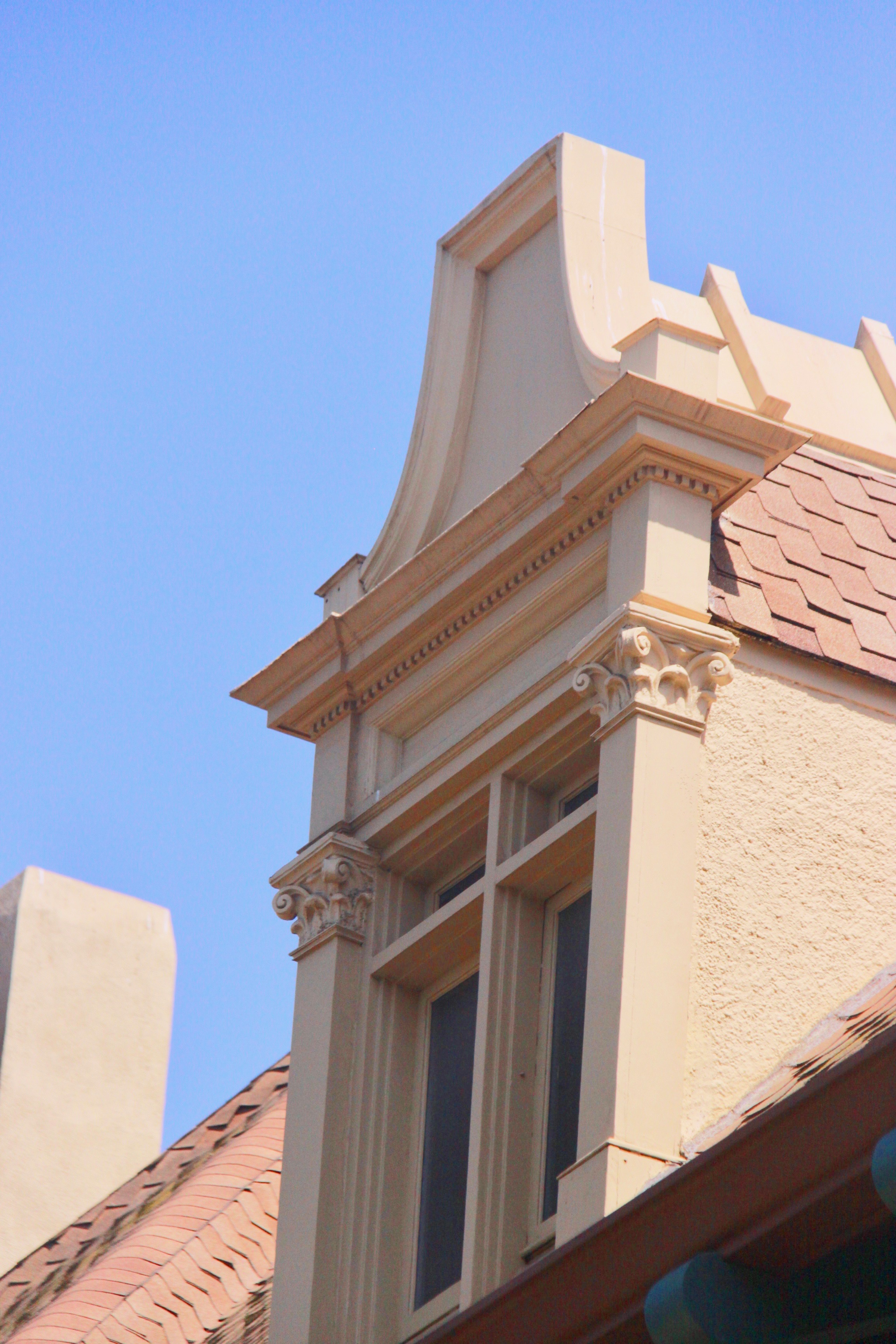
Mansard roof detail on the Rindge House.

== See also ==
- Adamson House
- Rindge Dam
- Malibu Potteries
- Rhoda Agatha Rindge Adamson
- Rhoda May Knight Rindge
- Rindge Co. v. County of Los Angeles 262 U.S. 700 (1923)
- List of Los Angeles Historic-Cultural Monuments in South Los Angeles
- List of Registered Historic Places in Los Angeles
- Hueneme, Malibu and Port Los Angeles Railway (The railroad that the Rindges built through Malibu)
- Rufus Keeler
