= Hueneme, Malibu and Port Los Angeles Railway =

Railroad in Malibu, California, US

The Hueneme, Malibu & Port Los Angeles Railway was a standard-gauge, 15-mile railroad (24 km) in Malibu, California. It was founded by Frederick Hastings Rindge (1857–1905) and operated on his 13,000-acre ranch (5,300 ha) along the coast, which encompassed most of what is today Malibu. He struggled for years to keep trespassers off of his land, and feared that the Southern Pacific Company would use the power of eminent domain to build a railroad through his property. That threat animated Rindge to plan his own railroad to thwart the efforts of the Southern Pacific. It was part of his overall effort to keep outsiders off of his ranch, who he believed would spoil what he considered to be paradise.

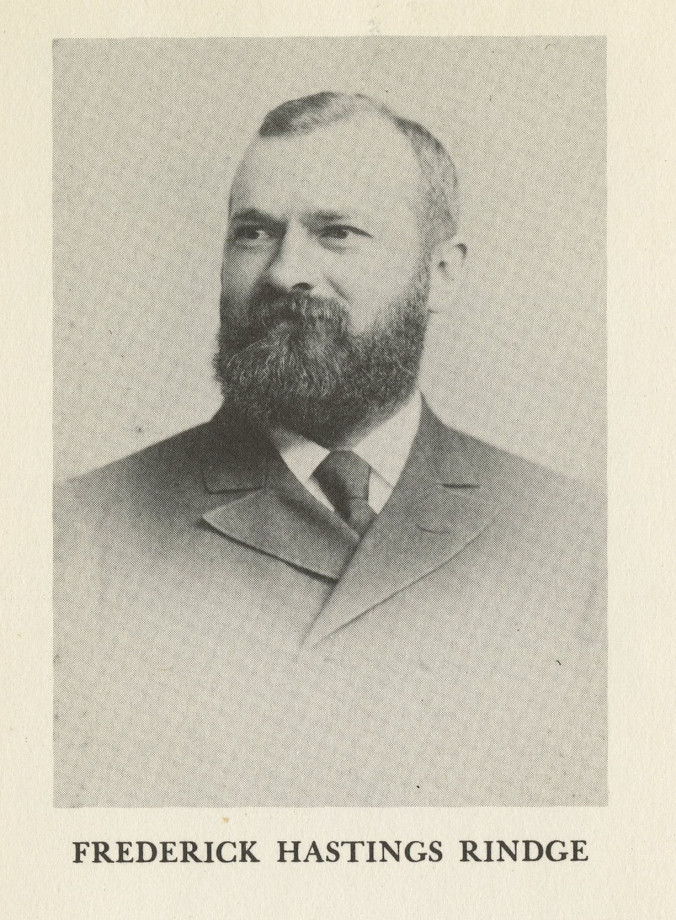
Frederick Hastings Rindge, ca. 1898.

== Background ==
Frederick Rindge could trace his ancestry back to Daniel Rindge in Puritan Massachusetts in the 17th century. The Rindge family had done well, and when Frederick's father died in 1883, and his mother two years later, Frederick was the sole heir to a Boston textile manufacturing and real estate fortune variously estimated at $180 million to $900 million in 2025 dollars. He was a millionaire in an age when there were fewer than 4,000 millionaires in the United States.

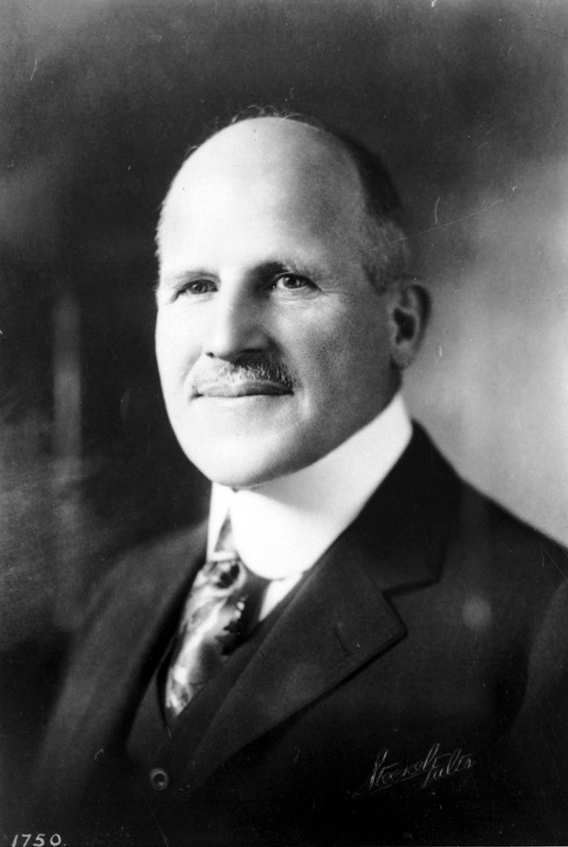
Moses Sherman was a land developer who built the Phoenix Street Railway in Phoenix, Arizona and streetcar systems that would become the core of the Los Angeles Railway and part of the Pacific Electric Railway in Los Angeles. He was potentially interested in extending his rail lines through the Rindge ranch. However, in spite of this, or perhaps because of it, Rindge included him as one of the incorporators of the Hueneme, Malibu and Port Los Angeles Railway. Rindge probably valued his expertise and figured that the real threat to his ranch would be from a large railroad such as the Southern Pacific, rather than from a local streetcar network such as Sherman's. Sherman's business partner and brother-in-law, Eli P. Clark, was one of the early landowners in the Big Rock Drive area (just east of the Rindge ranch), along with newspaper publisher William Randolph Hearst.

Frederick Rindge and his wife, Rhoda May Knight (1864–1941), went to Los Angeles in 1887, when it was still a frontier. There, he was successful in various business ventures, including founding the Conservative Life Insurance Company and the Los Angeles Edison Electric Company. Rindge became one of the wealthiest men in the state. In 1892, the Rindges purchased the 13,000-acre (5,300 ha) Rancho Topanga Malibu Sequit from Henry Keller. The price was about $10 an acre for the Malibu ranch which was a little over one mile (1.6 km) wide and extended along the coast for about 20 miles (32 km), from Las Flores Canyon westward to the Ventura County Line.

Rindge was a very religious man and saw God's hand in the wild beauty of his ranch. In his book Happy Days in Southern California, he wrote about his attachment to the land: "I have grown to love this land. When we moved from the city to the country, it seemed like returning from folly to truth.”

The ranch produced barley and beans on the few relatively level areas of the mountainous property, and cattle and sheep were grazed in the canyons. Rindge had ongoing problems with trespassers. He put up locked gates, but the locks were repeatedly cut and the gates destroyed. He also wound up in court, fighting claims from those who had been trespassing for years and claimed the right to continue to do so.

In 1903, a brush fire burned to the ground the large Victorian mansion in Malibu Canyon that the Rindges had built. The wildfire consumed their collection of antiques and family photographs, as well as other valuables. May Rindge felt that the brush fire had been caused by trespassers and their campfires. Frederick feared losing his paradise.

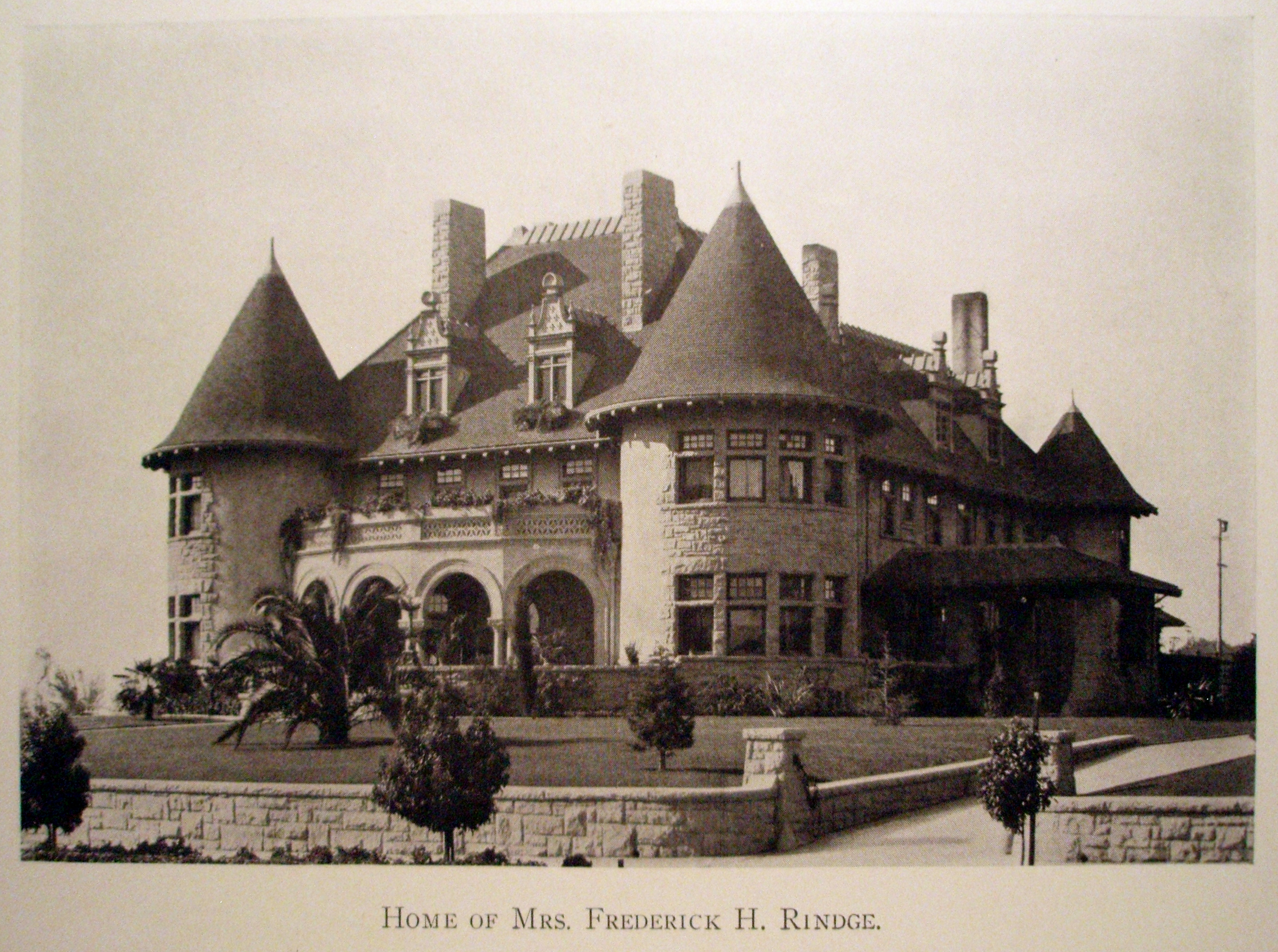
Unlike their mansion in Malibu, the Rindge family home in Los Angeles still stands. Located at 2263 South Harvard Boulevard, the stately house has been used in a number of movies.

== Railroad construction ==
Another threat was the tempting sea-level route that the Rindge ranch offered for the construction of a railroad from Los Angeles northward to San Francisco. A water-level route would have saved the Southern Pacific from having to use helper engines to shove its trains up the stiff grades of its inland routes through Saugus and the Santa Susana Pass.

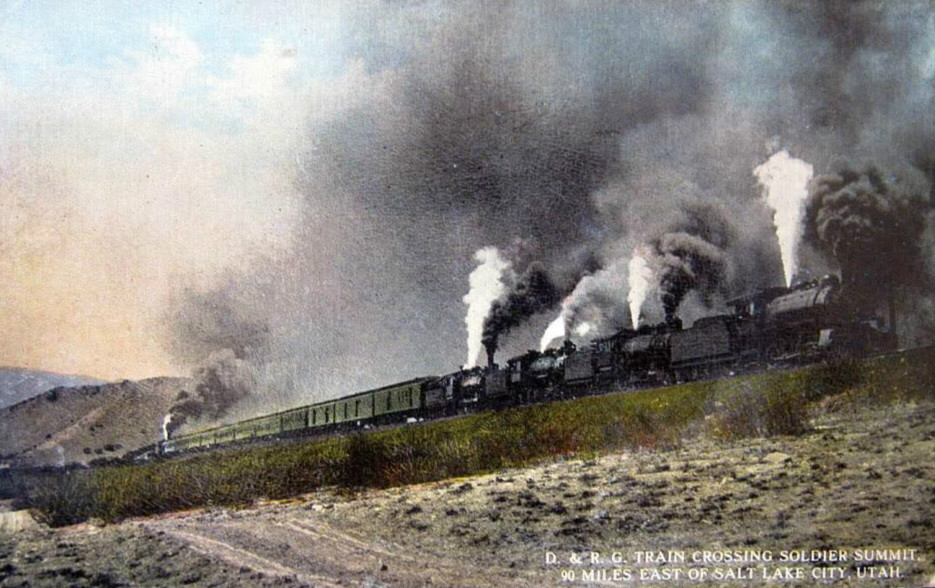
Denver and Rio Grande train employing helper engines on both front and rear.

Prior to 1920, the Interstate Commerce Commission did not have jurisdiction over railroad construction, but Rindge calculated that if he built his own railroad through his ranch on the narrow, level strip of land between the sea and the mountains, the courts would not grant eminent domain to any competing railroad wanting to build a parallel line. Thus, he incorporated the Hueneme, Malibu & Port Los Angeles Railway in 1903, with him and his wife being the major stockholders.

Frederick Rindge died in August 1905. It is said that his widow, May K. Rindge, had promised him on his deathbed to preserve the beauty of their “Sunset-Land” ranch and resist all efforts by others to invade their domain. She spent the next 30 years doing everything she could to fulfill that promise. It fell to her to build the railroad that they had planned. She became the president of their railroad, and expended every effort to keep the Southern Pacific out of their ranch. She was the first woman ever to head a railroad in California, and the only one in the country at large.

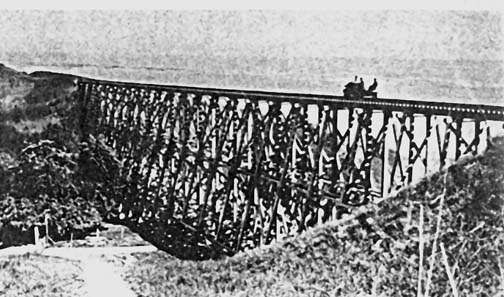
The Rindge railroad trestle over Ramirez Canyon (at Paradise Cove). On the trestle is the small engine that the Rindge railroad purchased in 1908. The Rindge railroad route generally hugged the coast, often just above the high-tide line. However, due to the steep cliffs right at the water's edge at Point Dume, the railroad turned inland at Paradise Cove, climbed over the bluffs, and then came back down to the beach just past the tip of Point Dume.

Surveys were run to connect the railroad with the Southern Pacific line at its Long Wharf at Port Los Angeles, which was at the location of the current Will Rogers State Beach lifeguard headquarters at 15100 W Pacific Coast Highway, Pacific Palisades, California. Surveys were also run to connect with the Bakersfield & Ventura Railway near Hueneme, California. However, that would have meant extending the line several miles outside the boundaries of the Rindge ranch on either end, and entailed negotiating with other landowners, some of whom were less than enthusiastic about the project. To further complicate matters, the Southern Pacific already had a right to the portion of the right-of-way that crossed the Marquez Ranch, which was between Temescal and Topanga Canyons.

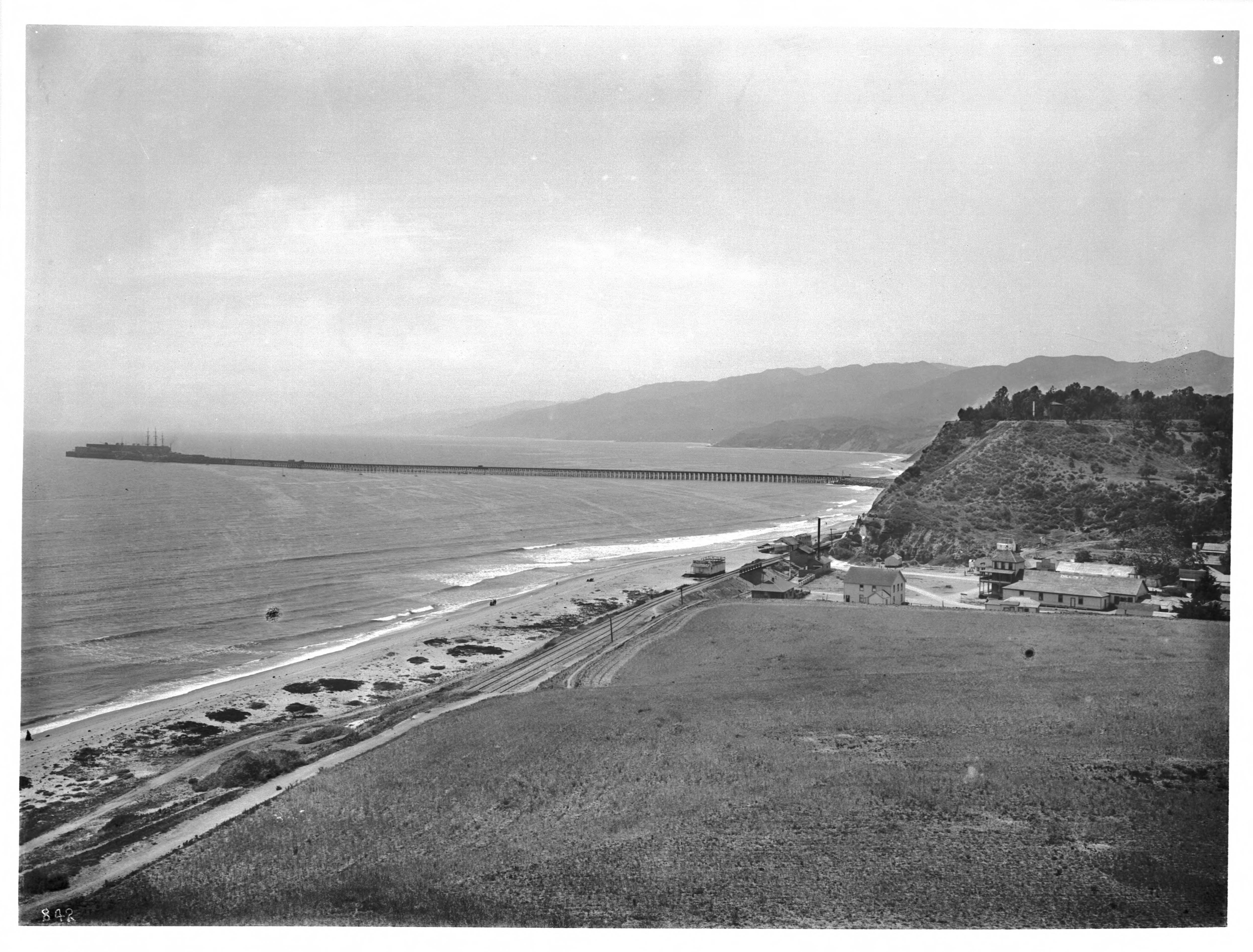
The Southern Pacific Long Wharf (Port Los Angeles), ca. 1900. When it opened in 1894, it was the longest wharf in the world, measuring approximately 4,700 feet (1,400 m). Santa Monica Canyon is at right, and Malibu is in the background.

Rather than wait for the situation to be resolved, construction was begun on Rindge ranch property in September 1905. Renewed activity took place in the spring of 1906. Crossties and rails arrived at San Pedro docks, and were transferred to barges, which were towed by tugs to the new 600-foot pier (180 m) that had been constructed at Keller's Shelter on the Rindge ranch. By October, five miles (8 km) of track had been laid westward from Carbon Canyon (near the eastern boundary of the ranch), and work was suspended for the season.

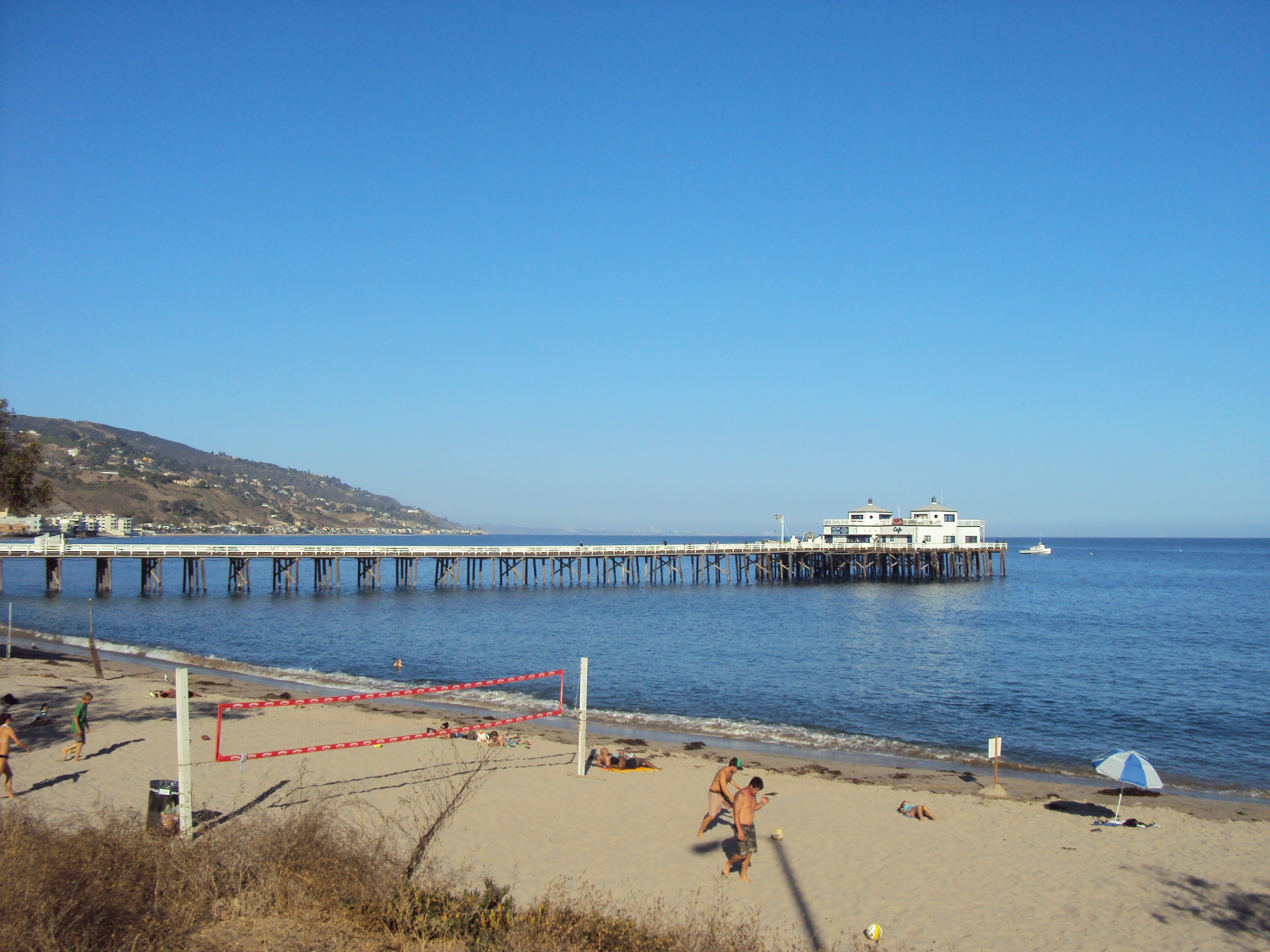
Ties, rails and other materials were unloaded at the Rindge pier (now known as Malibu Pier) at Keller's Shelter. Later, in 1908, the railroad construction contractor experimented with unloading ties directly into the ocean and letting them drift to the construction site, which apparently worked successfully.

The law at the time required that five miles (8 km) of railroad be constructed each year or the company would have to forfeit the right to continue building. In 1907, May Rindge let a contract for another five miles (8 km) of railroad to be built. That track, approaching Point Dume, was completed by October. In 1908, the railroad acquired its only rolling stock, a small, 15-horsepower (11 kW), gasoline-powered engine made by H. P. Fellows, and two flat cars. That equipment speeded track construction and assisted in building the railroad's two large trestles, one that was 40–50 feet (12–15 m) high, spanning Ramirez Creek, and the other spanning Walnut Creek on Point Dume. By October 1908, the railroad was 15 miles (24 km) long and reached a point 1,400 feet (430 m) past Encinal Canyon, about four miles (6 km) from the county line.

Apparently, no further track was laid thereafter. The nearest connection with another railroad was seven miles (11 km) away. As the Ventura Free Press put it, “It starts nowhere, and ends nowhere. It connects with nothing.”

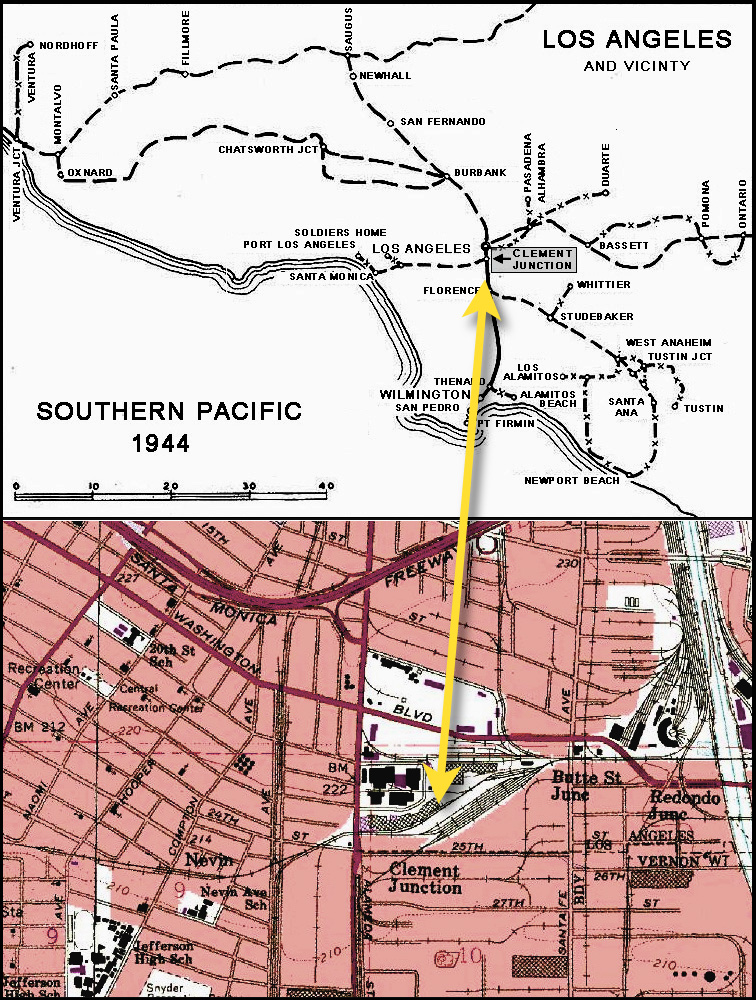
To this day, the Southern Pacific coast route (now Union Pacific) from San Francisco to Los Angeles swings inland at Oxnard, rather than going through the Rindge ranch at Malibu.

The Rindge railroad had achieved its objective. The Southern Pacific never entered the Rindge ranch.

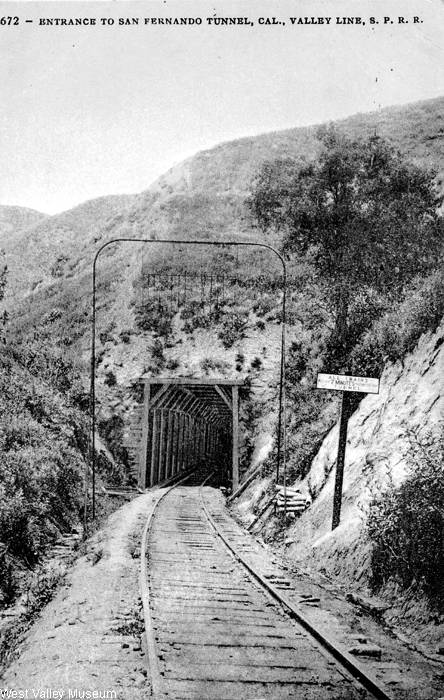
Entrance to the San Fernando Tunnel in Newhall Pass on the Southern Pacific, ca. 1900.

== Railroad operations ==
The railroad proved useful in ranch operations. In 1909, it brought 4,000 sacks of ranch barley and 3,000 sacks of beans to the Rindge pier where they were sent by barge to Port Los Angeles (the Long Wharf).

Even though no track was laid in 1909, May Rindge kept her options open by forming a new corporation, the Tidewater Northern Railroad. Then, in 1911, she formed the Malibu Tidewater Railway. In 1916, she formed the Heuneme, Malibu & Southern Railway, and transferred the railroad's property to the new corporation.

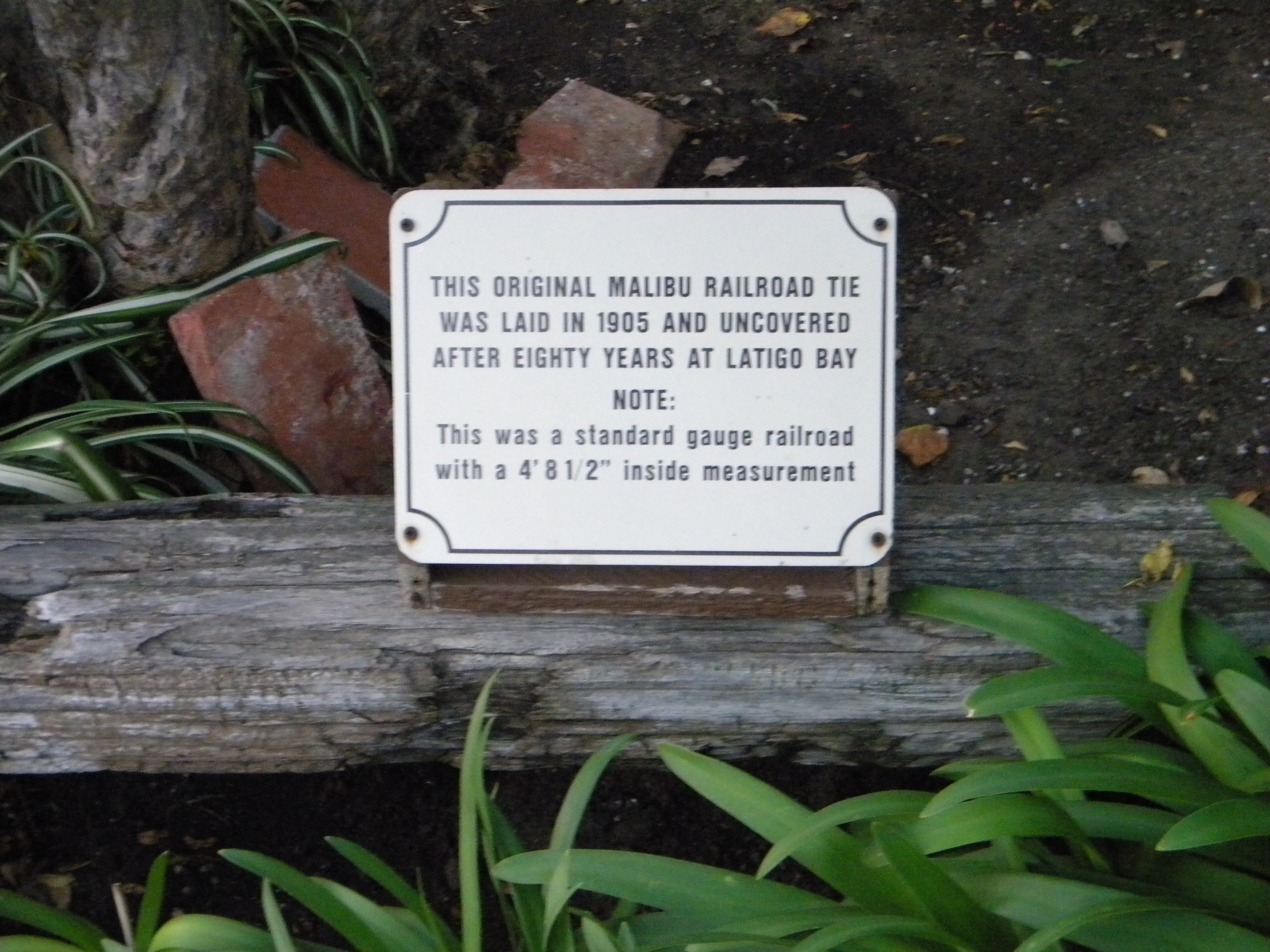
An original railroad tie from the Hueneme, Malibu, and Port Los Angeles Railway

=== County Road and State Highway ===
What the Southern Pacific could not do to the Rindge ranch, the county and state did.

Despite 22 years of expensive court fights against it, extending all the way to the Supreme Court, May Rindge lost to county and state road-building efforts. In 1921, the county built a road through the ranch. In 1929, the Roosevelt State Highway was also constructed through the ranch, condemning a large portion of the railroad right-of-way in the process.

N. D. Darlington, who had been May Rindge's chief engineer when constructing the railroad, returned to the ranch to work on dismantling the railroad he had built. The rails were used as reinforcing steel in the construction of the Rindge Dam in Malibu Canyon.

The new roads created a mania for the beach-front property. May Rindge's expensive legal battles and suffering fortunes led to her to lease beach-front lots on the ranch, which came to be known as Malibu Colony. Eventually, the bulk of the ranch was sold and it is now occupied by expensive homes.

The railroad car barn, a corrugated steel building, was located at 22917 Pacific Coast Highway, just east of the Rindge pier (today's Malibu Pier). It was leased to a variety of retail businesses until 1983, when it was razed.

In 1983, a severe storm hit the Malibu coast. After the storm, beach walkers discovered an odd sight that the storm had uncovered: a 40-foot (12 m) section of 80-year-old railroad track.

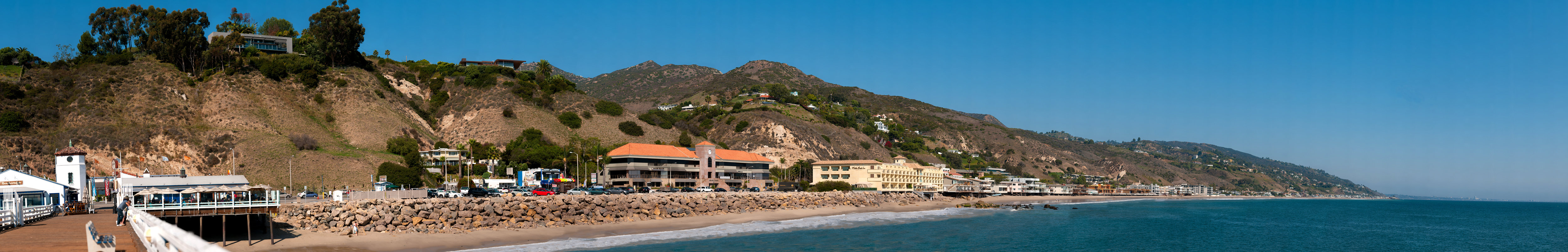
View from the Rindge pier (Malibu Pier). The large building with the orange roof occupies the site of the Rindge railroad car barn.

== See also ==
- Frederick Hastings Rindge
- Frederick Hastings Rindge House
- Rindge Dam
- Malibu, California
- Santa Monica Mountains National Recreation Area
- Malibu Potteries
- Rindge Co. v. County of Los Angeles 262 U.S. 700 (1923)
- Adamson House (section Rindge-Adamson family)
