= Rhoda Adamson =

American dairy owner

- Born: Rhoda Agatha Rindge; April 20, 1893; Los Angeles, California
- Died: April 2, 1962 (aged 68); Los Angeles, California
- Occupation: Businesswoman
- Known for: Adohr Farms, Adohr Dairy & Creamery

Rhoda Agatha Rindge Adamson (April 20, 1893 – April 2, 1962) also known as Rhoda Agatha Adamson or simply Rhoda Adamson, was the co-founder and secretary-treasurer of Adohr Farms and Adohr Dairy & Creamery, one of Southern California's largest and most successful dairies. She was the daughter of Rhoda May Knight Rindge and Frederick Hastings Rindge and wife to Merritt Huntley Adamson.

== Early life ==
Adamson was born Rhoda Agatha Rindge, the middle child of Rhoda May Knight Rindge and Frederick Hastings Rindge, transplants to California from Michigan and Massachusetts, respectively. The family lived in Santa Monica as well as a Victorian mansion in Malibu Canyon, on the Rindge's 13,315-acre ranch. The ranch home was destroyed in 1903 fire; from there on out, the family only camped in Malibu when visiting the family ranch. Otherwise, they no longer lived in Santa Monica, but rather a 25-room mansion in West Adams Heights, known as the Frederick Hastings Rindge House.

Adamson was raised to love the outdoors, and, riding horseback, she partook of activities such as sheep-herding with her father on the Malibu Ranch. She also enjoyed recreational horseback riding and race-car driving. The former she often partook of with her best friend, Jesse Ellen Matheson, to whom she had gifted a horse named Robin. The pair rode their horses across Malibu's Santa Monica Mountains, usually armed with shotguns should a rattlesnake have presented a threat. Adamson's car racing, meanwhile, took the shape of annual races, such as those held in Santa Monica.

== Education ==
For high school, Adamson attended a private girls' school called Casa de Rosas. The graduation ceremony in June 1910, accommodating 29 graduates, was held at Los Angeles's Ebell Club. Adamson attended Wellesley for a year, from 1910 to 1911, before returning to California, missing her home state too much to stay away.

== Marriage, businesses, homes, and children ==
=== Marriage, Adohr Farms, and Adohr Creamery Co. ===
Rhoda met her husband, Merritt Huntley Adamson, by way of the family ranch; Merritt had been appointed ranch foreman. He was temporarily injured on the job, and Rhoda nursed him back to health. They were married on Nov. 18, 1915. A year later, as they shared an interest in animal husbandry, they began a small beef ranching operation, though it took a backseat to their primary business: Adohr Stock Farms at 18000 Ventura Blvd., Tarzana, CA, located next to Times-Mirror publisher Harrison Gray Otis's ranch. Merritt Adamson assumed the office of the president of Adohr, while Rhoda served as secretary-treasurer. Adohr Stock Farms was the umbrella organization from which the Adamsons would grow Adohr Farms and Adohr Dairy & Creamery, the latter of which was headquartered at 1801 S. La Cienega Boulevard and Sawyer Street. A giant milkmaid and cow sculpture, created by Art-Vertising of Los Angeles, stood at the Adohr locations. The business was named Adohr for Rhoda, as Adohr is Rhoda spelled backward. Their ad campaign "Adohr-able Babies" featured their daughter, Rhoda-May, as the first Adohr-able Baby.

In addition to becoming one of the biggest dairies in the United States, Adohr would come to be one of the largest certified dairies in the world, and come to boast the world's largest herd of Guernsey and Holstein-Friesian cows, tallying in at 1,650 head of cattle. The milk was certified by the Milk Commission of the Los Angeles County Medical Association and was a "consistent winner" in contests ranging from the California State Fair in Sacramento to the Pacific International Live Stock Exposition in Portland, Oregon, and more. The organization thrived throughout the Great Depression, as milk consumption was bolstered by Prohibition, though the beef ranch side of the enterprise was forced into bankruptcy. Darling of the Depression era, Shirley Temple, became an Adohr promotional figure, naming Adohr cows like Tillie Temple from Tillamook and Dinah. Clarence "Ducky" Nash, the original voice of Donald Duck and countless other cartoon characters, also promoted Adohr products as Whistling Clarence, the Adohr Bird Man. He was a mere milkman with Adohr, yet became known for the funny voices and sound effects he produced to the delight of children on his delivery route. He hence became Whistling Clarence, and was tasked with riding in a wagon drawn by miniature horses through the streets of Los Angeles, dispensing treats to children. His Adohr resume and other voice work impressed Walt Disney, and Nash was brought into the Disney family in this way. Other dairy promotionals included cow milking contests to the benefit of Warner Bros. Theatre.

The dairy ran on a 24-hours-a-day schedule, with 100 employees carrying out the operation of the plant itself, while scores of additional employees—Adohr milkmen—were deployed across hundred of routes to deliver milk straight to clients' doorsteps, and sometimes, straight to their refrigerators, as did long-time milkman Elmer Moss. And the company offered not only milk but buttermilk, butter, cream, ice cream, cottage cheese, eggs, and other milk products like whipping cream.

The Tarzana farm and additional farmland in Kern County, California, meanwhile, provided the room necessary to grow feed for the livestock and allow them out to pasture. This branch of the business entailed growing 150 acres of corn and 300 acres of alfalfa. Simultaneous to the dairy operations, Rhoda managed Kentucky-bred prize horses of the Saddlebred and draft varieties.

=== Homes and children ===
The couple settled into an Elmer Grey-designed home in the Hancock Park neighborhood of Los Angeles and started a family. They had three children—Rhoda-May (b.1917), Sylvia (b.1921), and Merritt Jr. (b.1926). In 1929, the couple commissioned Stiles O. Clements to build them a weekend and summer home on 13 acres in Malibu that Rhoda's mother had gifted them. Two Danish painters, Ejnar Hansen and Peter Nielsen, hand-painted doors, cupboards, and other surfaces in the house, while John Holtzclaw, an interior decorator, worked to create a cohesive home for the Adamsons, coordinating furnishings with textiles, the Danish painters' work, and the abundant Malibu tile. The home, the Adamson House, was completed in 1929, and the family moved in during June 1930. They loved it so much that by 1936, they had moved in full-time. There, the family raised prized chickens, tended bees, and accommodated a variety of pet animals, including goats, dogs (Saint Bernards being one of the breeds), a sheep named Bohunkus and a donkey named Don Quixote. The family was friends with cowboy-humorist Will Rogers, and Rogers was known to ride his horse from his ranch in Pacific Palisades to the Adamson house where he would perform rope tricks for the Adamson children.

The home's downstairs guest room was reserved for Rhoda's mother, Rhoda May Knight Rindge. Not only had May Rindge gifted the land upon which the Adamson House was built, she also provided the home's extensive tile from her own tile factory, Malibu Potteries. The home contains such an extensive display of the tile that it is referred to as the "tile Taj Mahal" or "Taj Mahal of tile."

=== World War II, Merritt's death, and Adohr changes ===
During World War II, the Coast Guard wanted to take over the Adamson House, hoping to use it as an outpost. The family declined, but did allow officers to stay in the poolhouse as well as semi-permanent tents along their stretch of beach. This arrangement became the Coast Guard's Command Post No. 5. The home, like most buildings during the war, was required to make use of blackout shades—light-blocking shades covering all windows in the home so that enemy aircraft or submarine would have difficulty making sense of the landscape at night. Merritt Adamson volunteered as an air-raid warden, riding his horse from the Adamson House down to the Malibu Pier and back on patrol. Rhoda, like many heads of house, did a lot of canning in the war years, creating edible preserves of all kinds. In 1941, the Adamson family heard about the bombing of Pearl Harbor on what was a luxury to most families then—a large Scott radio in their living room. They sat around the same radio to hear President Franklin Delano Roosevelt's fireside chats.

In 1948, imminent post-war suburbia began infringing on the Tarzana dairy operation, and the Adamsons owed money to creditors. Merritt hence sold the Tarzana dairy property to builders who planned to divide the land into parcels for construction of low-cost housing for veterans. In preparation, original dairy structures were dismantled, including its three 31-year-old silos, which had to be razed with the help of the Los Angeles County Fire Department Demolition Squad and a significant amount of dynamite. The dairy operations were moved to Camarillo. A year later, Merritt Adamson died, leaving Adohr completely up to Rhoda to operate. The same year, Adohr published a cookbook called Milk-Maid Recipes from Adohr, with recipes ranging from Butter Crunch Cake, Southern Spoon Bread, Hot Peppermint Chocolate, Purple Cow Soda, Sour Cream Raisin Pudding, and Cornmeal Soufflé to Boston-Style Scalloped Fish, Asparagus With Lemon Sauce, Cheese Salmon Loaf, English Lamb Chops, and Cheese Ham Casserole. The dairy's radio program, an opera show called Adohr Opera of the Air, continued; opera singers for the program were auditioned in none other than the Adamson House living room.

== Death and legacy ==
Rhoda Adamson died in 1962. Rhoda's dairy continued under the Adohr Farms name into the 1990s or early 2000s, though the original buildings in the San Fernando Valley had long-since been demolished, starting in 1948, and the family had sold the business in 1966. As a ubiquitous model dairy in its time, it set a high standard for all dairies that followed. Rhoda-May, the eldest Adamson child, continued to run the dairy business quite closely after her mother's death.

Additionally, Rhoda-May formed the Adamson Company with her siblings, Sylvia and Merritt, an organization to manage the family's real estate holdings. It was a continuation, in effect, of their grandmother and mother's Marblehead Land Co., which had been formed to manage the original Rindge real estate holdings. It was through their family's holdings that they continued to shape the City of Malibu's development. For example, Merritt Jr. was part of a successful fight against the prospective construction of a nuclear power plant in Malibu's Corral Canyon. Also in the '60s, he wanted to "carry out a master plan he and his partners--his two sisters--secretly commissioned in 1965: a proposal by prominent architect William L. Pereira to develop much of Malibu with clusters of houses set off by huge natural preserves from surrounding large estates." Though the plan never came to pass due to ill-fated timing and exorbitant property taxes, Merrit Jr. went on to build "a mobile home park, a recreational vehicle park, and condominiums" and "subdivided land and sold it for homes," such as the Horizon Hills subdivision. He also "sold thousands of acres to the state and federal governments for open parkland that would both preserve wildlife and attract tourists." It was through this action that original Rindge property helped create the Santa Monica Mountains National Recreation Area.

As for the Adamson House, it remained and, as of 2025, remains the best extant example of Malibu Potteries offerings. As the potteries was Rhoda's mother's business, it stands testament to both the Rindge and Adamson legacies. Rhoda Adamson lived at the Adamson House until she died. Upon her death, the property went into a state of limbo. The State of California was calling eminent domain on the property, and the Adamson descendants could not afford the high property taxes on it. Hence, they sold it to the State of California in 1968.

No sooner had the transaction been completed, then the state declared they would be demolishing the home to make it a parking lot for the surfers, as surf culture had exploded in the 1950s and '60s, creating a demand for automobile access to the area. Horrified, Malibu citizens formed the Malibu Historical Society expressly to save the home. It made no difference that the home was a masterpiece of Stiles O. Clements, nor was it considered remarkable, in the state's eyes, in its lineage tied to the Rindge family. What saved it was the provenance of its tile: the tile had been a product of Malibu's first business, the Malibu Potteries; it had been made using local clays; and its glazes were not reproducible, as creator and glaze expert Rufus Keeler died of cyanide poisoning shortly after the Malibu Potteries closed, and he had taken measures to commit his recipes to memory alone.

It took approximately ten years for the historical society to hash out the case with the state. In the interim, Pepperdine University's chancellor, Norvel Young, moved into the home with his family. Also during this time, the Adamson family donated 138 acres of their land to Pepperdine, so that Pepperdine, which was outgrowing its Watts campus, and whose campus had been badly damaged during the Watts Riots of 1965, could move its campus to Malibu. The 138 acres were foundational, as they were the first 138 of the new campus.

Finally, in 1977, the Adamson House was designated California landmark No. 966. In 1985, it was listed on the National Register of Historic Places. Rhoda's home of 33 years, it has been open for public tours since 1982 and is home to the Malibu Lagoon Museum. It is also the site of weddings and special events, yet remains completely intact, as it was in the Adamson Family's tenure, complete with their belongings, from Rhoda's I. Magnin's and Bullock's dresses, Haviland & Co. dishware, and Adohr Farms milk bottles, to original bedspreads, Barker Bros. furniture, and Merritt Adamson's map collection.

== See also ==
- Adamson House
- Rhoda May Knight Rindge
- Malibu, California
- List of Registered Historic Places in Los Angeles County, California
- Malibu Potteries
- Rufus Keeler
- Frederick Hastings Rindge
- Frederick Hastings Rindge House
