= Rufus Keeler =

American ceramicist (1885–1934)

- Born: Rufus Bradley Keeler; 1885
- Died: October 29, 1934 (aged 48–49)
- Occupations: Master ceramicist and ceramics glaze expert
- Known for: California Clay Products (CalCo), Malibu Potteries

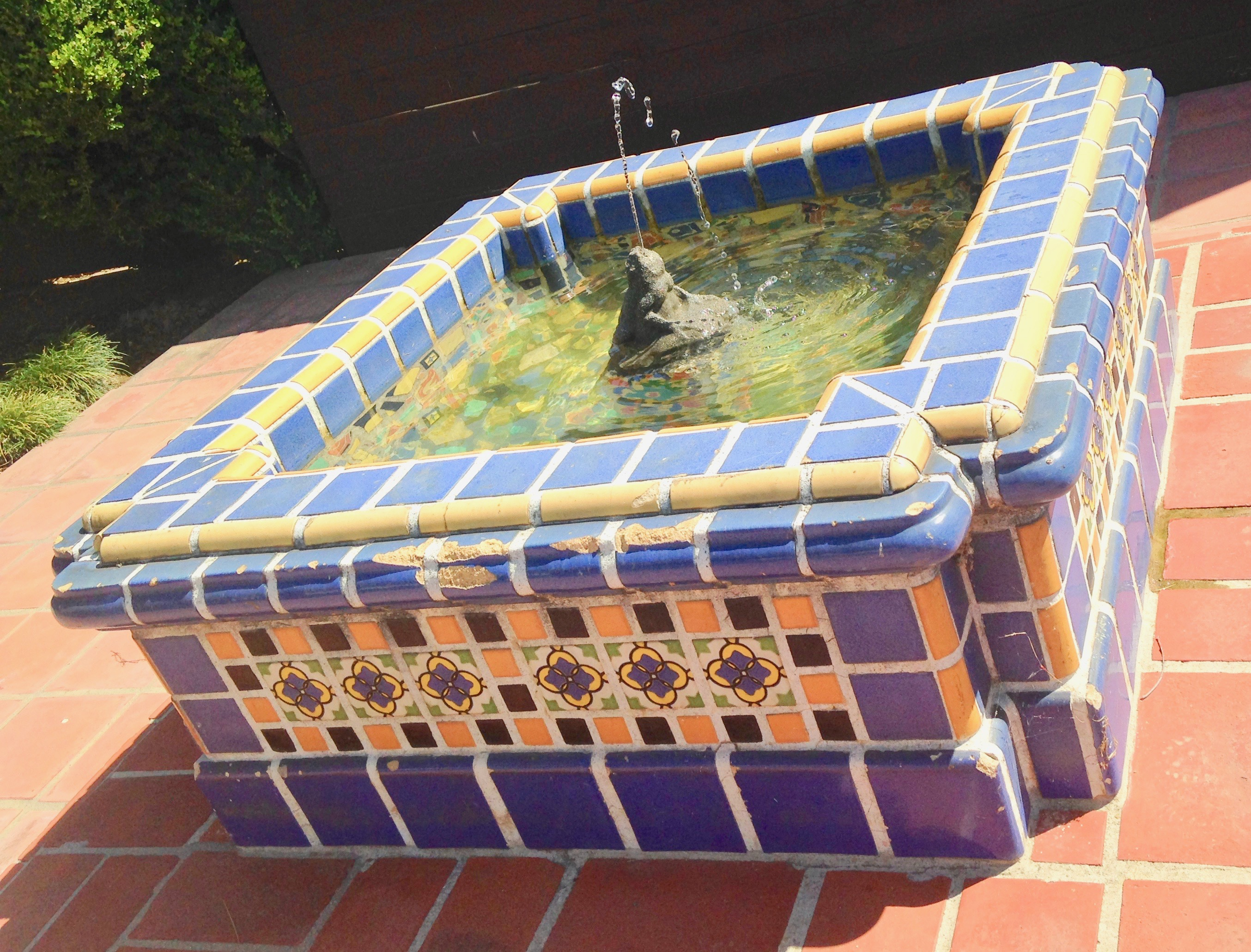
A CalCo tile frog fountain at El Encanto in Monterey Park, California.

Rufus Bradley Keeler (1885 – October 29, 1934) was a master ceramicist and ceramics glaze expert. He was plant superintendent of California China Products, a co-founder of California Clay Products (CalCo), and plant manager of Malibu Potteries. He was married to Mary E. Leary and had three sons and one daughter, including ceramicist Bradley Burr Keeler, who founded Brad Keeler Artwares and who came to be president of the California Art Potters Association and director of the California Gift and Art Association.

== Early life ==
=== Ancestry ===
Keeler was the son of Burr Bradley Keeler (b. Aug. 1, 1844), a Rochester, New York-born real estate owner; grandson of Rufus Keeler and Phoebe Valeau; great-grandson of Josiah Keeler and Betsey Bradley; and a descendant of Sons of the American Revolution-registered Isaac Keeler (b.1715), Lieutenant of the 5th Connecticut Regiment, and his wife, Hannah Stebbins; Josiah Keeler (b. Jan. 22, 1741–1777), a private in the 5th Connecticut Regiment, and his wife, Elizabeth Stebbins; and Philip Burr Bradley (March 26, 1738-Jan. 24, 1821), Colonel of the 5th Regiment of the American Army, and his wife, Ruth Smith.

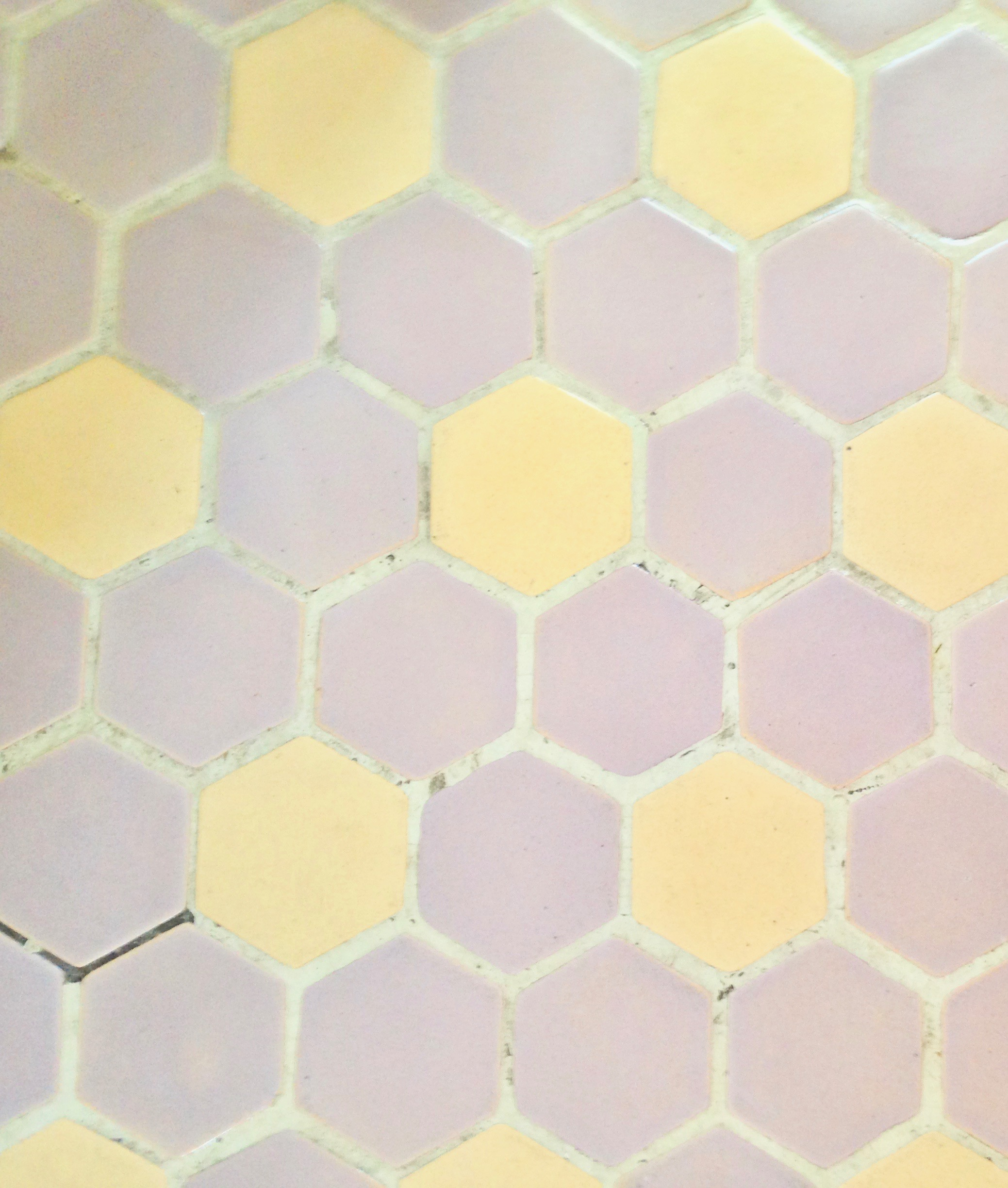
CalCo tile example.

=== Marriage, children, and home ===
Keeler was born in Bellingham, Whatcom County in the state of Washington and raised in San Francisco, California. He married Mary E. Leary and together they had three sons and one daughter—Bradley Burr Keeler (b.1913), Byron Keeler (b. 1925), Philip Keeler, and Jeanne Keeler—whom they raised in Huntington Park, California, later called South Gate. Keeler built a home "from scratch" for the family, installing ceramic art tile along the way, including in each room "floor tiles of a distinct color and pattern with ceramic baseboards enhanced with wisteria, clematis, and yellow roses," a 8'x 9' Mayan-motif fireplace in the living room, and other lush usages. He spent a year camping in the garage, the home's first completed portion, while overseeing the rest of the home's construction and performing manual labor on it himself, as well.

=== Friendships ===
Keeler was friends with Ernest A. Batchelder, a prominent early California ceramicist of the Arts and Crafts movement out of Pasadena, California.

== Career ==
Keeler worked for various clay products companies in California such as Carnegie Brick & Pottery in Carnegie, San Joaquin County, California, Gladding McBean in Lincoln, California, and California China Products in National City, California, the latter at which he worked as plant superintendent, before starting his own business in 1917, handcrafting tiles for fireplace surrounds. With the help of investors, he then expanded the business to co-found California Clay Products (CalCo) in 1923 or '24.

CalCo produced tile for fireplace surrounds, wall inserts, framed tile wall hangings, wainscoting, step risers, floors, countertops, fountains, and countless iterations therein. Motifs included the flamingos, cherubs, peacocks, and Mayan and Moresque designs. The company's tile was installed in many private as well as public structures, one such being Jardin El Encanto, a 1927 real estate office in Monterey Park, California that in the modern era is the Greater Monterey Park Chamber of Commerce. CalCo tile also found its way into the Lt. Earl R. & Mildred B. De Long House in San Diego, the Montclair Women's Club in Oakland, California, and the Watts Towers in Watts, California.

In 1926, Keeler was recruited to oversee Malibu Potteries, founded by Rhoda May Knight Rindge. There, he oversaw a staff of 125 employees including his former CalCo employee, Lillian Ball, who became a Malibu Potteries tile glazer, then his personal assistant and secretary; tile designers William Handley, Inez Garnet Johnson Von Hake, and Donald Prouty; clayman and presser Glen Dawson, secretary Dorothy Prouty, and others.

The factory produced 30,000 square feet of tile monthly, tile that met the demand of the 1920s real estate boom of Mission Revival, Spanish Colonial Revival, Moorish Revival, and Mayan Revival homes and public buildings. Malibu tile made its way into the Roosevelt Hotel, Los Angeles City Hall, the Geffen Playhouse (then the Masonic Affiliates Club), the Mayan Theater, Dana Junior High School in San Pedro, the Adamson House, and countless private homes.

Malibu Potteries ceased to be in 1932 due to the intersection of a major kiln fire which destroyed the entirety of the factory, the Great Depression, and its owner, May Rindge's debt. From there, Keeler worked as a freelance ceramics consultant for the span of about a year. He then gained a full-time position with Emsco Refractories, located at 8661 Dorothy Ave. in South Gate, whose specialty was aircraft manufacture "but had a subsidiary business producing very high temperature-resistant ceramic tiles" as well as bricks.

== Death and legacy ==
Keeler died of inadvertent cyanide inhalation while working in his Emsco Refractories laboratory. He had forgotten to turn on the exhaust fan in the lab and was unaware of an uncorked beaker of cyanide on a workbench, its odorless vapors already permeating the room. Keeler died ten days later, on Oct. 29, 1934. His wife, Mary, continued to live in the home they built together for the family in South Gate until 1983, when she shifted to residential care in Orange County, California. Brian Kaiser, who bought the house, was inspired to research Rufus Keeler, his tile-making, and Southern California tile companies of the early 20th century, lecturing on the topic and acting as a consultant for tile preservation projects. Meanwhile, Keeler's products still are seen throughout Southern California and beyond, public examples of which are the aforementioned Roosevelt Hotel, Los Angeles City Hall, Geffen Playhouse, Mayan Theater, Dana Junior High School in San Pedro, and Adamson House in Malibu as well as the Watts Towers in Watts, California and Serra Retreat in Malibu.

== Gallery ==
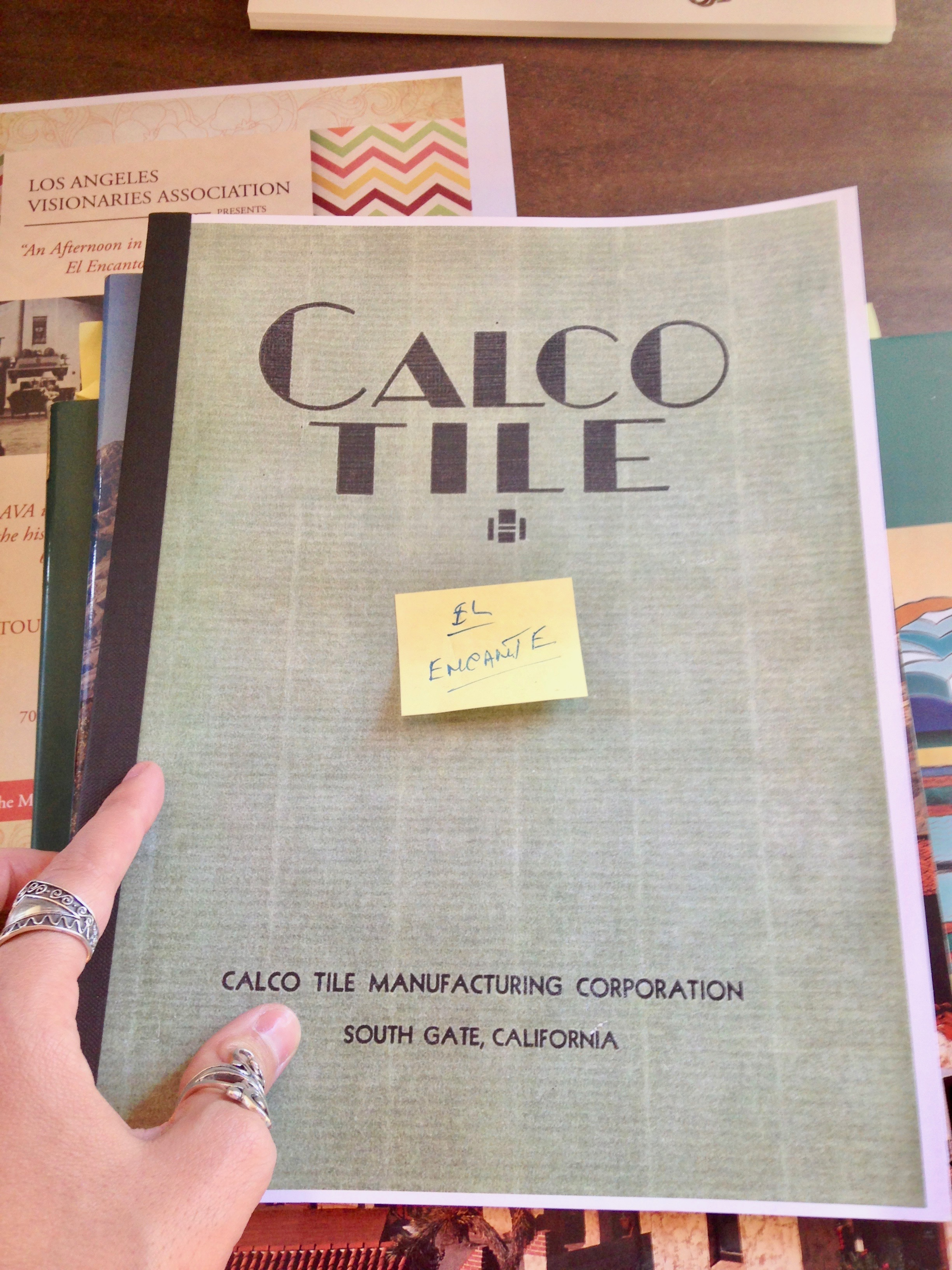
A CalCo tile catalog.
