= Rhoda May Knight Rindge =

American businesswoman

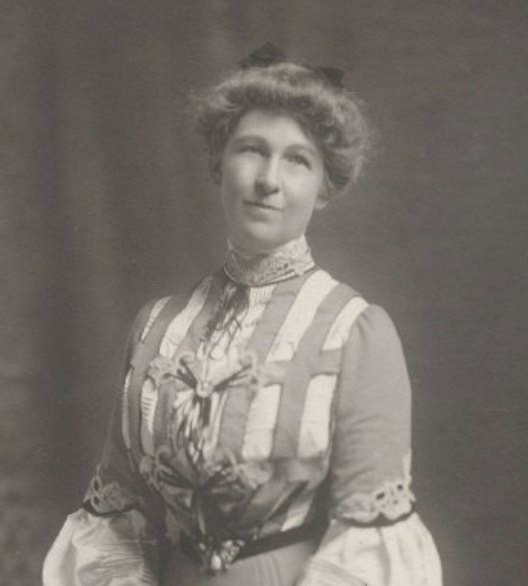
- Rhoda May Knight Rindge, c. 1900–1901
- Born: Rhoda May Knight; 1864
- Died: 1941 (aged 76–77)
- Other names: Queen of Malibu, May K.
- Occupations: Businessperson, environmentalist
- Known for: Founder of Malibu Potteries, and the Malibu Movie Colony
- Spouse: Frederick Rindge
- Children: Rhoda Agatha Rindge Adamson, Frederick Rindge Jr., Samuel Rindge

Rhoda May Knight Rindge, (b. 1864, d. 1941), also known as May Rindge or May K., was an American businesswoman. She was known as the Queen of Malibu as well as the Founding Mother of Malibu and L.A.'s first high-profile female environmentalist. She was the first woman to serve as president of a railroad company. Additionally, she founded Marblehead Land Company in 1921, and the Malibu Potteries in 1926, the first business in Malibu. The company originated Malibu tile, and the venture became one of Southern California's most successful of its kind alongside Catalina Pottery, Gladding, McBean, and Batchelder tile.

Rindge also founded the Malibu Movie Colony, building and renting cottages—and later selling them—to early Hollywood stars such as Bing Crosby, Gloria Swanson, and Mary Pickford. She fought bitterly to preserve her family's rancho, the Rancho Topanga Malibu Sequit which extended from Los Flores Canyon in Malibu into Ventura County.

Rindge successfully diverted the course of the Southern Pacific Railroad by fighting their efforts to connect their Santa Barbara end terminus with Santa Monica; the route would have been coastal, not only infringing on the family ranch but destroying the natural beauty and topography of the Pacific Coast. In the process, Rindge constructed the Malibu Pier. Rindge subsequently became known for her battle to keep the Pacific Coast Highway—at the time, Roosevelt Highway—from accomplishing the same and similar goals. Rindge also built the 100-foot-high Rindge Dam. Furthermore, she built what became the Franciscan order's Serra Retreat. Rindge is also known as donor of the land upon which her daughter and son-in-law's home, the historic Adamson House, was built.

== Early life ==
Rindge was born Rhoda May Knight in 1864, the eighth child of James and Rhoda Roxanna Lathrop Knight. She grew up on a sheep farm outside Trenton, Michigan with 12 siblings. By age 22, she was working as a math teacher at a local schoolhouse.

Knight's family was strictly Methodist. Her aunt, Emily Lathrop Preston, the founder and proprietor of a cult-like religious faith-healing health colony in Northern California, first brought Knight out west. Back in Michigan, Knight was paid a visit by Frederick Rindge, who had been a client at Preston's colony. He had seen a photograph of her on Preston's piano, felt enchanted, and asked Preston for her blessing in romantically pursuing her niece. Preston encouraged the coupling. Rindge had proceeded to write Knight letters, leading to their face-to-face acquaintance. Knight and Rindge determined their compatibility and within two days were engaged. They were then married within a week, moving out to California within the year, 1887, by way of first-class Pullman Palace rail car. Upon arrival, they stayed at Emily Preston's ranch before venturing to Southern California.

== Homes, children, and businesses ==
The Rindge couple had three children: Samuel, Frederick Jr., and Rhoda Agatha. The family first settled into a home in Santa Monica. In the 1890s, the family began utilizing a Victorian ranch home they built in Malibu Canyon, which eventually burned down in a brush fire in 1903. They also had a home in Santa Monica. It had been Rindge Sr.'s dream to come to California for its temperate climate and what he had imagined as the American Riviera when he first came to California with his father on the first transcontinental railroad. He had always wanted a farm by the sea, and once he purchased the Malibu rancho as the final Spanish land grant owner of the property, he established a cattle ranch. He also became deeply involved in civic life, from serving as director of Edison Electric, founding Conservative Life Insurance Company, and promoting Temperance by helping close saloons in Santa Monica to building Santa Monica's First Methodist Episcopal Church and taking the post of vice president of Union Oil. When he died suddenly at the age of 48 in 1905, Rhoda May Knight Rindge was left with the totality of his business dealings, setting the stage for her unusual position at the time as a woman at the helm of a major family estate.

=== Victory over Southern Pacific Railroad and construction of Malibu Pier ===
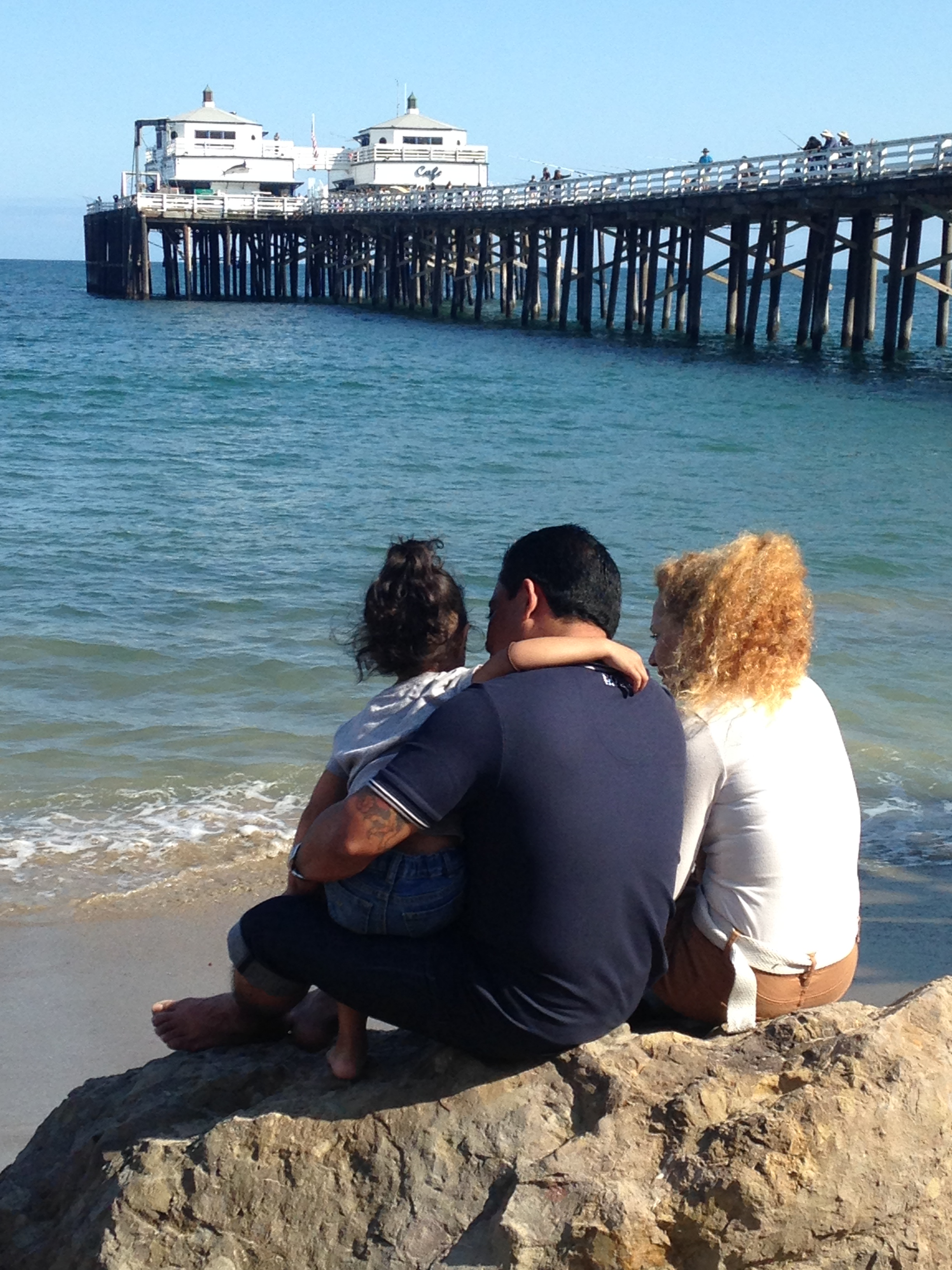
A look down the east side of Malibu Pier.

Prior to her husband's death, there had been word that Southern Pacific intended to connect their Santa Barbara terminus with Santa Monica, which would entail running tracks right through the vast 13,315-acre Rindge property. Frederick hatched a plan to take advantage of an obscure Interstate Commerce Commission law that stated if one railway ran through a property, there could be no other railway doing the same. Hence Rindge decided to build his own private track—a utilitarian one to service his cattle ranch—but died before carrying out the plan, leaving the operation up to Rhoda May. She subsequently built the Malibu Pier and 15 miles of standard gauge track, known as the Hueneme, Malibu and Port Los Angeles Railway, that ran down the length of the pier, where a steam-powered crane lifted cattle hides and walnuts onto boats for shipment and grains onto land for cattle-feed. The operation kept Southern Pacific Railroad out of Malibu, diverting its course inland.

=== Court battles over county roads and Roosevelt Highway ===
Rindge had successfully won her Southern Pacific Railroad battle, but on her victory's heels came homesteaders along the edge of her property demanding county roads to be laid through her ranch for the public good. Rindge was strictly opposed to the idea, entering the law office of O'Melveny & Myers in 1907 to take up the new fight against the Federal Government and People of the State of California. What ensued was an approximately 16-year fight costing Rindge over $1 million a year, first to keep out the roads, then Roosevelt Highway. The court cases were extremely complex and imbued with intense hostility, with Rindge sabotaging the public's efforts to lay roads with extreme measures. Such measures ranged from employing armed guards on horseback to patrol her property and enforce locked gates to digging up roads and replacing them with alfalfa and pigs. She waged civil suits, numbering in the hundreds, for trespass, libel, and defamation of character. Ultimately, she lost her county roads battle and, finally, her effort against Roosevelt Highway, enumerating four California Supreme Court cases and two United States Supreme Court cases, including Rindge Co. v. County of Los Angeles.

=== Founding of Malibu Potteries ===
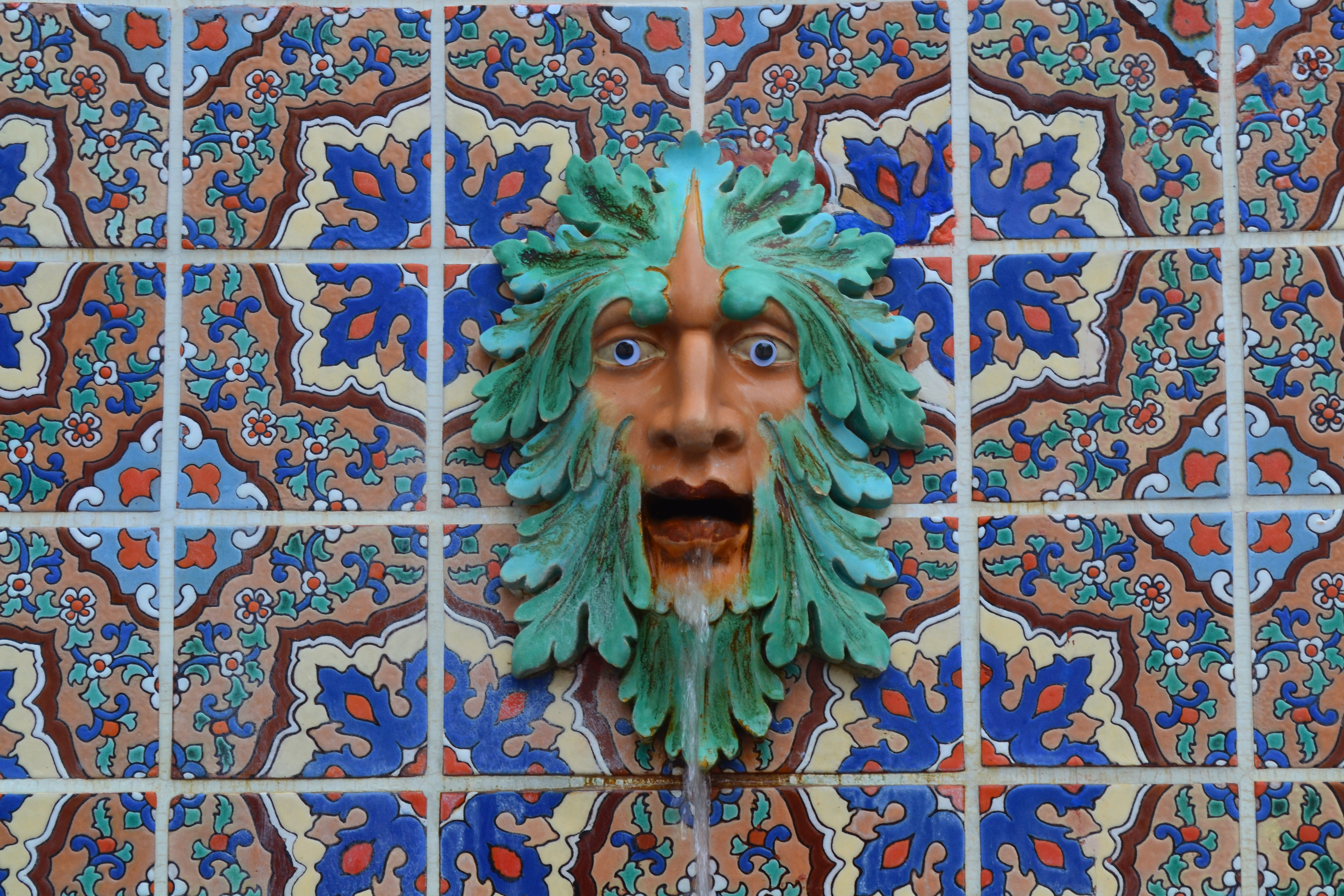
Malibu Potteries Eternal Man on the grounds of the Adamson House in Malibu, California

In 1926, Rindge found herself land-rich and cash-poor due to her extensive court battles. In an effort to recoup her expenditures, she first drilled for oil on her property, establishing the Rindge derrick on Point Dume, but found none. However, she uncovered clay that she was told were ideal for tile-making. As the 1920s were a real-estate boom in Los Angeles, with thousands upon thousands of homes being built, and furthermore, in the tile-reliant Mission Revival, Mayan Revival, Spanish Colonial Revival, and Moorish Revival styles, a tile business promised to be lucrative. Thereafter, Rindge built Malibu Potteries a half mile east of her pier, right on the beach. She recruited renowned tile and glaze expert Rufus B. Keeler to run the factory. At its peak, 125 employees worked at the factory, producing 30,000 square feet of tile monthly. Women hand-painted tile with toxic substances such as cadmium for oranges, uranium for oranges and reds, cobalt for blues, and lead for yellows. Methods included cuerda seca and cuenca, and patterns and iconography were inspired by books from an expensive library with which Rindge furnished the pottery. The potteries produced not only flat ceramic tiles for ceilings, walls, baseboards, and floors but also ceramic tile fountains, murals, urns, and bathroom built-ins like toothbrush holders and soap dishes.

=== Construction of Serra Retreat and Malibu Movie Colony ===
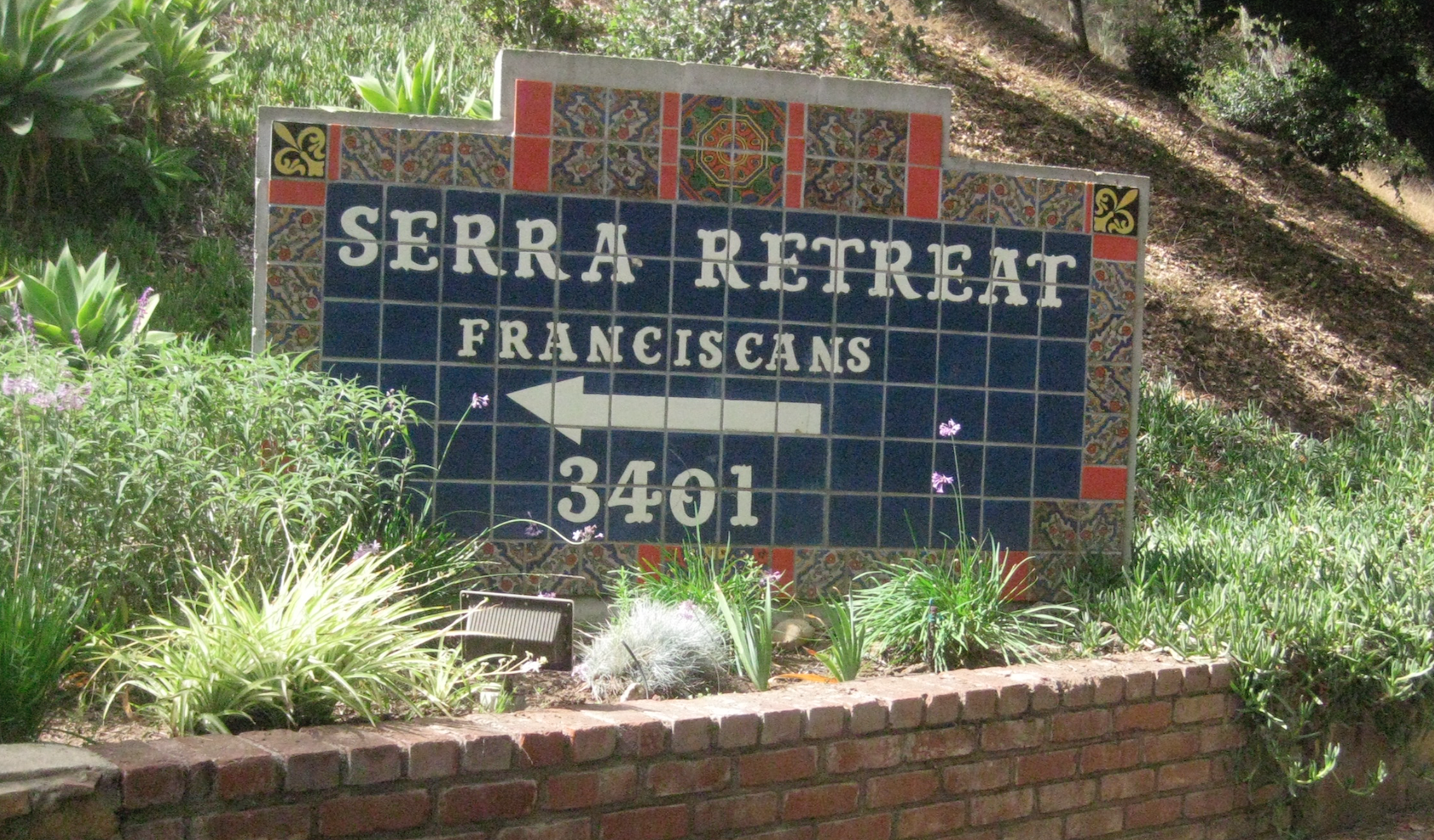
The Rindge Castle became Serra Retreat after it was sold to the Franciscan order.

Despite the success of the pottery, Rindge still struggled to balance her finances, even as her net worth was estimated in the many millions in 1928. Hence, Rindge's next venture was the Malibu Movie Colony—cottages built on her beachfront by movie studio carpenters that were at first leased to figures in the nascent movie business such as Bing Crosby, Gloria Swanson, Mary Pickford, Anna Q. Nilsson, Dolores del Río, Gary Cooper, Lana Turner, Adela Rogers St. Johns, Carole Lombard, and Clark Gable. In the meantime, Rindge commissioned a 99-foot yacht called The Malibu and began work on a three-wing, 55-room mansion, called the Rindge Castle, atop Laudamus Hill, overlooking the ocean and a vast span of Malibu, with views reaching out to the Pacific Palisades. Nine thousand cases of Malibu Potteries tile were produced to adorn it, including a massive 13'x 59' all-tile faux Persian carpet, and hand-carved mahogany was to decorate it as well. When the Great Depression hit in 1929, followed by a kiln fire that destroyed most of Malibu Potteries in 1931 (closing the Potteries entirely by 1932), Rindge was plunged into further financial trouble. She could not afford to complete the Rindge Castle, and she was forced to sell off her Malibu Movie Colony properties other assets. By 1942, she was forced to sell her unfinished castle, with the buyer being the Franciscan order. Though most of the castle eventually burned to the ground in the 1970s, various parts were salvaged, including Malibu tile, and the property is still in the hands of the Franciscans as Serra Retreat.

== Bankruptcy, death, and legacy ==
By 1938, Rindge was bankrupt. Her relationship with one of her sons was fractured, as he held her responsible for depleting the family wealth so severely between her court battles and lavish expenditures. Rindge died in 1941.

Despite having been known to the public for so many years as more than ornery, her role in preserving Malibu's ecological landscape is still felt, as large swathes are not only preserved but protected as part of the Santa Monica Mountains National Recreation Area. This includes the sprawling, nature-ensconced Pepperdine University campus, for which her daughter's family donated the first 138 acres—original Rindge ranch land. World-famous Surfrider Beach, where her pier still stands and the Malibu Potteries lot remains vacant, is protected by the Surfrider Foundation and officially declared as the first-ever World Surfing Reserve via the Save the Waves Coalition. It is also listed on the National Register of Historic Places.

Meanwhile, Rindge's pier, regarded as a Southern California landmark, has been a recreation destination since the 1950s and home to fishermen since 1934. In 1933, Rindge gave permission for the pier to be used in what became the iconic movie King Kong starring Fay Wray, earning its place in film history. The pier was restored in 2009, earning its steward, California State Parks, the Los Angeles Conservancy Preservation Award. In Summer 2009, the pier became home to a surfing museum. As a community, Malibu is known for its wealthy entertainment business denizens, a stage Rindge set by being the first in the area to rent and sell homes to elite actors, directors, producers, and other aristocratic figures. In shaping the city in this way, she ultimately fulfilled her husband's vision for the region as an American Riviera.

The tile Rindge produced remains in thousands of homes, the most extensive display remaining being her daughter's home, the Adamson House, slightly west of Rindge's pier, while Los Angeles City Hall, the Mayan Theater, The Roosevelt Hotel, the Geffen Playhouse, Dana Junior High School in San Pedro, and other public buildings across the United States—and even some abroad—still contain their own examples of Malibu tile. Though predating the Potteries by roughly 20 years, hence containing no Malibu tile, the Rindge family home she and her husband built in West Adams Heights, the Frederick Hastings Rindge House, still stands—the home Rindge lived in until she died. It is on the National Register of Historic Places and is designated as a Los Angeles Historic-Cultural Monument. Her dam in the Malibu Hills is still extant, though long out of use and plans are in place to tear it down.

Rindge's life has been the subject of numerous print and online articles over time, and in 2017, a Los Angeles Times bestseller titled The King and Queen of Malibu: The True Story of the Battle for Paradise.
