= Rancho Topanga Malibu Sequit =

Land grant in California

Coordinates: 34.050°N 118.690°W

Rancho Topanga Malibu Sequit was a 13,316-acre (53.89 km^{2}) Spanish land grant in the Santa Monica Mountains and adjacent coast, within present day Los Angeles County, California. It was given by Spanish Governor José Joaquín de Arrillaga in 1804 to José Bartolomé Tapia.

The present day communities of Malibu and western Topanga are located on parts of the former rancho.

== History ==
José Bartolomé Tapia was the eldest of nine children of Felipe Santiago Tapia, a soldier in the De Anza Expedition of 1775. In 1800, José Bartolomé Tapia applied, as a reward for his own Army service, for a grant of the land he saw as a youth. The grant was made in 1804, and Tapia settled on the land, to graze his cattle and raise his family.

In 1848 Tapia's widow (Maria Francisca Mauricia Villalobo) sold the rancho to her grandson-in-law, Leon Victor Prudhomme who had married a daughter of Tiburcio Tapia, grantee of Rancho Cucamonga.

With the cession of California to the United States following the Mexican–American War, the 1848 Treaty of Guadalupe Hidalgo provided that the land grants would be honored. As required by the Land Act of 1851, Prudhomme filed a claim for Rancho Topanga Malibu Sequit but could not document the Tapia title and the claim was rejected. In 1857 he sold his undefined interest in the land to Irishman Matthew (Mateo) Keller (1811–1881). Keller was able to perfect his claim to the land, and receive a patent in 1872.

Eleven years after Keller's death, the rancho was sold to Boston and Los Angeles businessman and philanthropist Frederick Hastings Rindge in 1891.

== Historic sites of the Rancho ==
- Adamson House. A home designed by Stiles O. Clements, and completed in 1929 for Rindge's daughter, Rhoda Agatha Rindge, and her husband, Merritt Huntley Adamson.
- Rindge Dam. A dam built by May Knight Rindge in the 1920s and slated for demolition to begin in 2026.

== Tapia family ==
- Felipe Santiago Tapia (1745–1811), soldier in the de Anza Expedition. Tapia Drive in San Francisco's Parkmerced is named for him. The nearby Cardenas Avenue is named for his wife.
- Jose Bartolome Tapia (1766–1824), son of Felipe Santiago Tapia, eldest of nine children, grantee of Rancho Topanga Malibu Sequit.
- Tiburcio Tapia (1789–1845), son of Jose Bartolome Tapia, grantee of Rancho Cucamonga, Mayor of Los Angeles 1830, 1839 and 1840. Married María Tomasa Valdéz.
- Maria Merced Tapia de Prudhomme, daughter of Tiburcio Tapia, married Leon Victor Prudhomme.

== See also ==
- Ranchos of California
- List of Ranchos of California
- Ranchos of Los Angeles County
