= Rindge Dam =

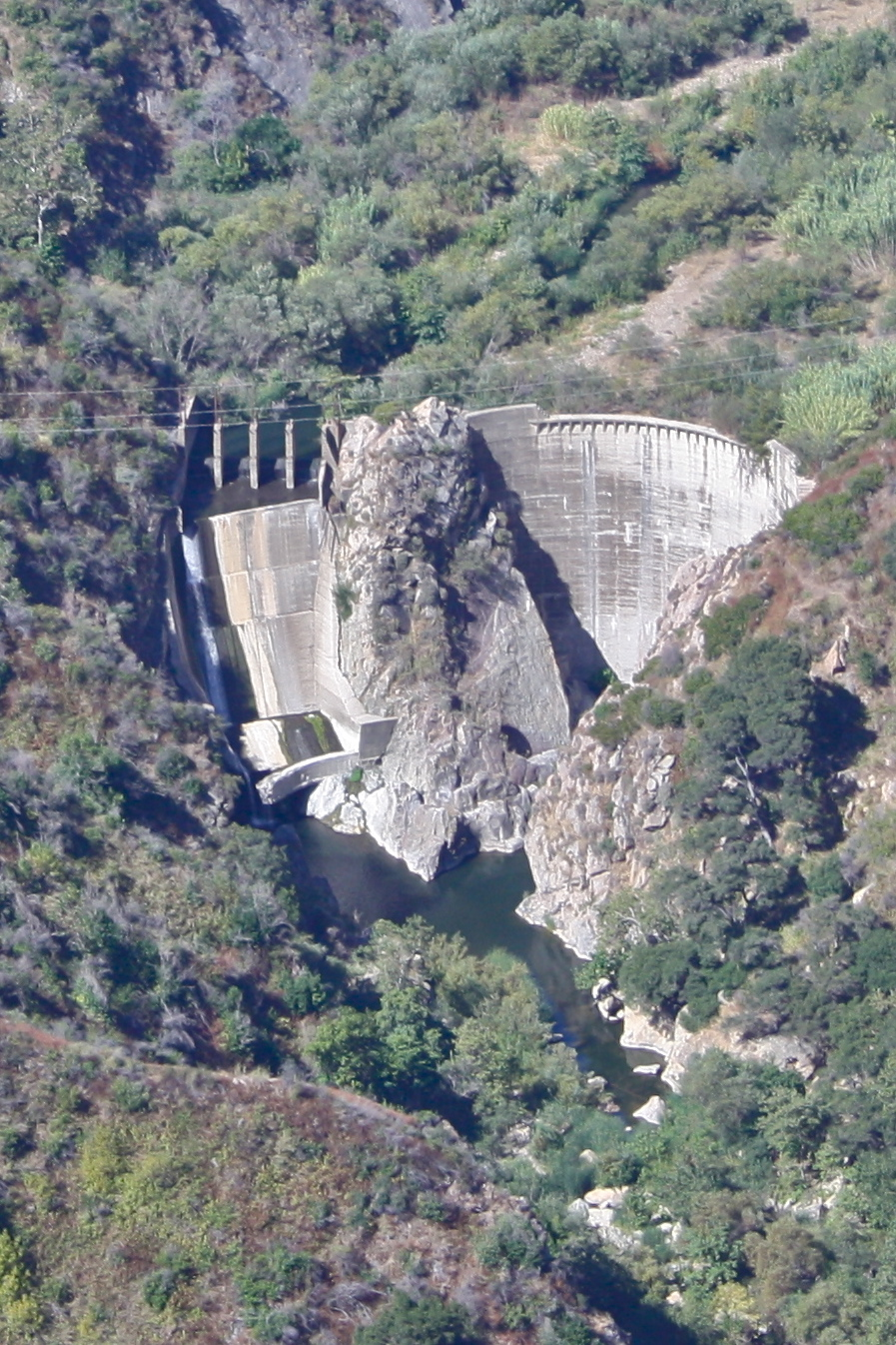
- Rindge Dam, seen from Piuma Road
- Interactive map of Rindge Dam
- Location: Malibu Creek State Park
- Coordinates: 34.064594°N 118.699328°W
- Opening date: 1924; 102 years ago
- Owners: May Knight Rindge, California Department of Parks and Recreation

Dam and spillways
- Type of dam: Concrete thin arch
- Impounds: Malibu Creek
- Height: 100 feet (30 m)

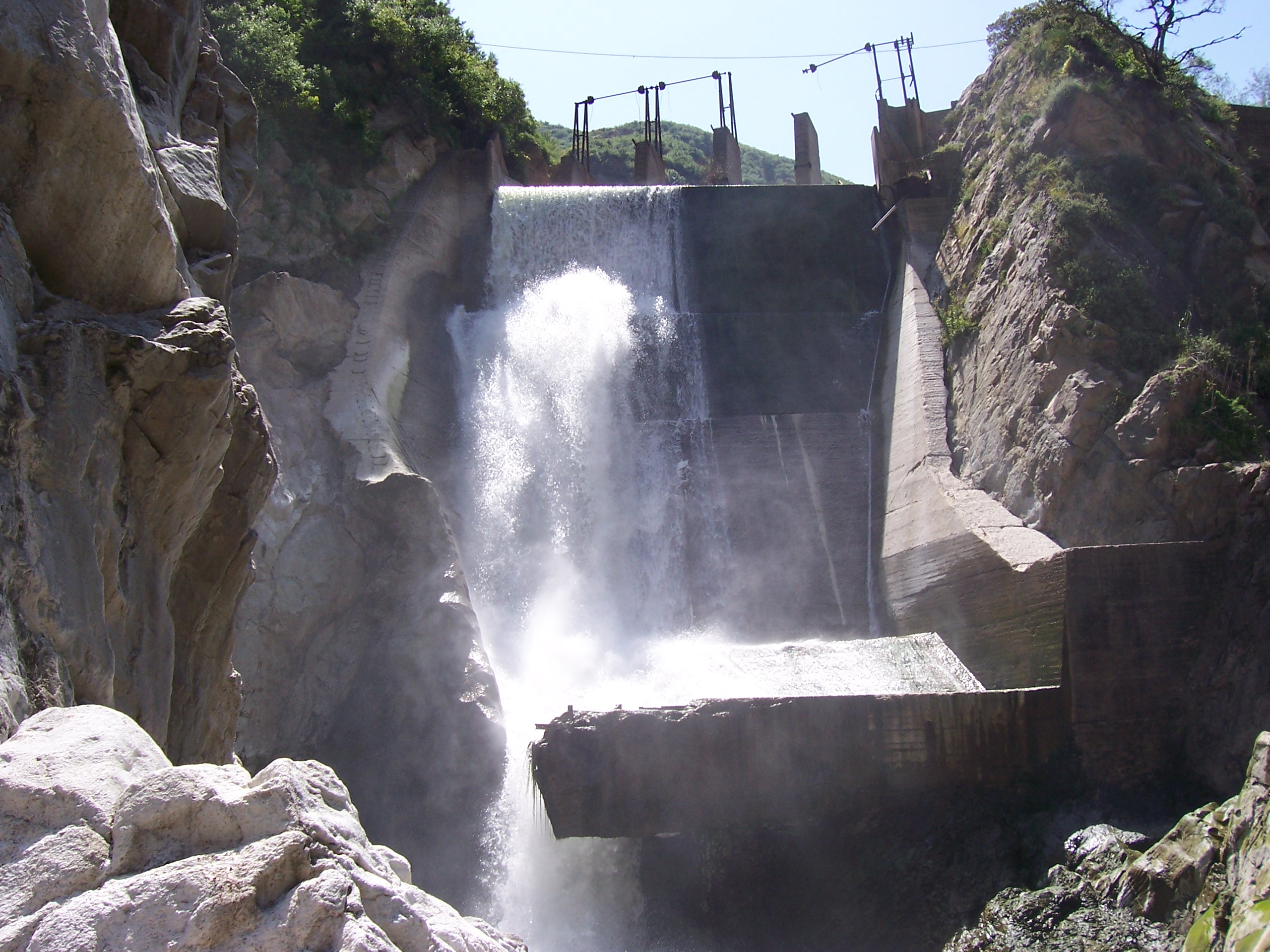
Rindge Dam spillway

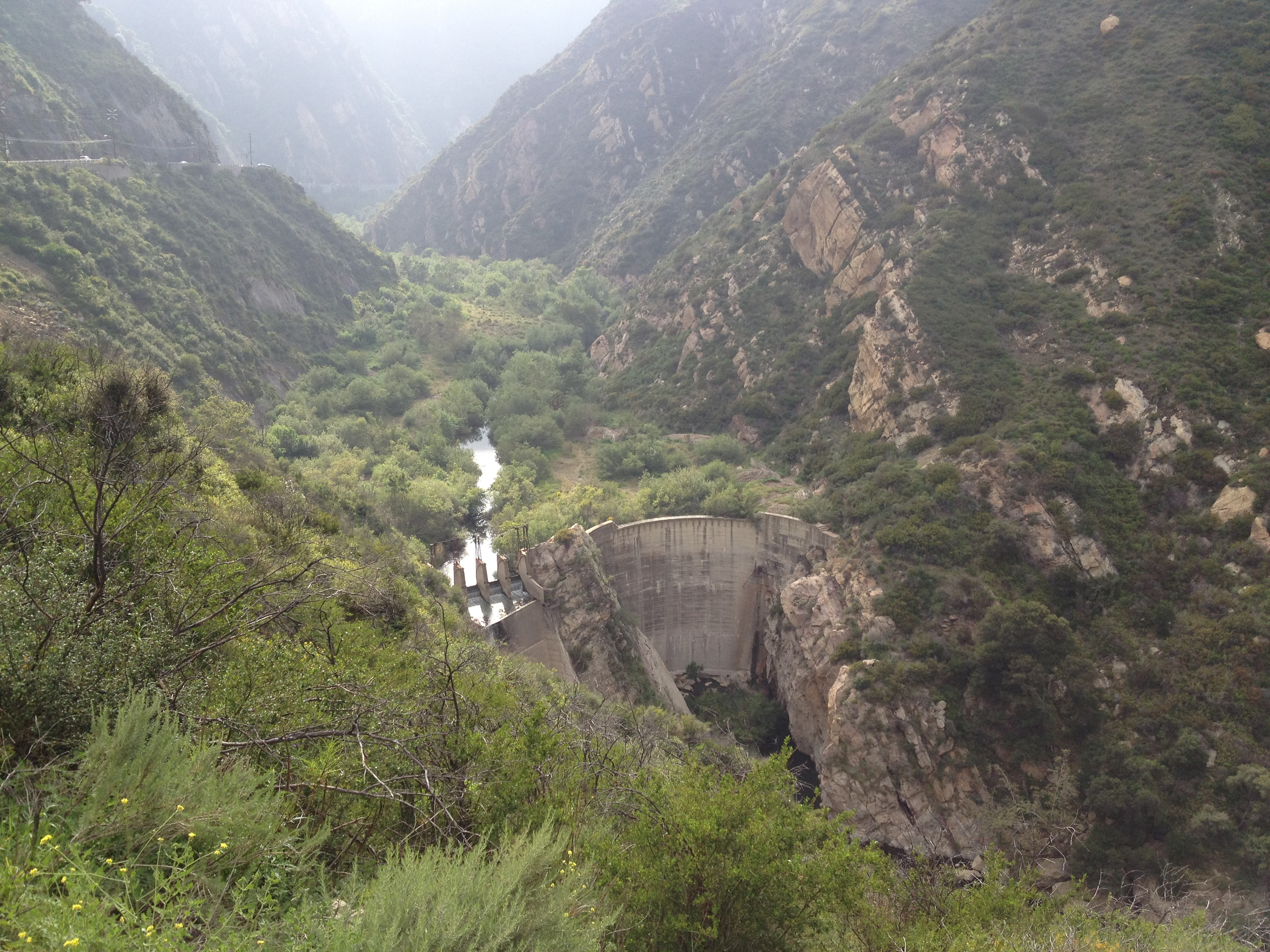
Rindge Dam and Malibu Creek, in Malibu Canyon

Rindge Dam is a 100-foot-tall (30 m) dam on Malibu Creek in the Santa Monica Mountains of Southern California. Located in Malibu Creek State Park, it sits just northeast of Malibu Canyon Road, and is partially visible from the turnouts south of the tunnel. The dam, a major obstacle to river wildlife, is due to be removed with demolition work beginning in 2025 and finishing in 2035.

== History ==
The dam was built by hired workers of May Knight Rindge, who owned the Malibu Ranch, the former Rancho Topanga Malibu Sequit. The frame of the dam was constructed using rails from the Hueneme, Malibu and Port Los Angeles Railway, which was a 15-mile railroad (24 km) that May Rindge built through the Malibu Ranch. The dual walls of the dam were built into an already-existing rock monolith in the center of Malibu Creek; the only place they meet is at the top. The main concrete arch of the Rindge Dam was completed in 1924. The spillway of the dam was finished in 1926.

The 600 acres (240 ha) behind the dam have been completely filled with sediment since circa 1950, which creates a waterfall from Malibu Creek. The dam became incorporated into Malibu Creek State Park in 1976.

== Proposed removal ==
Fish advocates have called for the dam's removal because it is blocking steelhead trout from accessing the upper reaches of the Malibu Creek watershed. Others have campaigned in vain for the designation of the Rindge Dam as a California Historical Landmark. The Rindge Dam is property of the California Department of Parks and Recreation and the structure has been in disrepair for decades. The dam was declared off-limits to the public in 2014.

The US House of Representatives authorized a dam removal study in 1992. The US Army Corps of Engineers released a draft in January 2017, entitled the "Malibu Creek Ecosystem Restoration Feasibility Study". Estimates for the cost of demolition have been as high as $80 million.

On March 9, 2018, the California Coastal Commission endorsed a plan to remove Rindge Dam. The Plan, developed by the Army Corps of Engineers, proposes removing the dam arch and spillway, along with 780,000 cubic yards (600,000 m^{3}) of sediment impounded behind the dam. Approximately 278,000 cubic yards (213,000 m^{3}) of clean sandy sediments would be removed by truck to Ventura Harbor, tested for pollution, and then deposited by barge in shallow ocean waters near the mouth of Malibu Creek, east of Malibu Pier. The sediment will be placed to avoid damage to nearshore kelp beds, and to allow the sand to eventually move shoreward and downshore to replenish nearby beaches. The remaining sediment would be deposited in the Calabasas Landfill. The project would also modify or remove barriers, mostly culverts under roads, that block fish migration on the Cold Creek and Las Virgenes Creek tributaries of Malibu Creek upstream from the dam. The project would start in 2025, and take eight years to complete.

Risks associated with the dam removal project include risk of slope instability where the dam and sediments are removed, and an increased risk of flooding downstream from the dam. Downstream neighbors and the City of Malibu have expressed concern about these risks.

In 2019 California Trout listed Rindge Dam as one of its top five priorities for dam removal, along with Scott Dam on the Eel River in Potter Valley, Matilija Dam near Ojai, four hydroelectric dams on the Klamath River, and Searsville Dam above Stanford University. The 1947 Matilija Dam, in the Los Padres National Forest north of Ojai also blocks steelhead trout spawning grounds and is planned for removal. Designed for water storage and flood control on Matilija Creek, it no longer performs either since it has silted up.

In April 2023, California State Parks announced that the removal of the dam would go ahead, with design plans, engineering, and permitting complete to 90% by 2026. The process will involve removing about 15 feet (4.6 m) of vegetation and sediment, lowering the dam, and repeating the process after each winter with rain that runs through to area.

== See also ==
- List of dams and reservoirs in California
- Malibou Lake
- Sherwood Dam
