= Tile (disambiguation) =

A tile is a manufactured piece of hard-wearing material.

Tile or Tiles may also refer to:

== Places ==
- Tile (Martian crater)
- Tile, Somalia
- Tile Ridge, in Antarctica
- Tiles (club) – a famous music club in London in the 1960s

== Games ==
- Tile (dominoes), a playing piece in dominoes
- Tile, a game piece in a tile-based game
- Tile, the art of the playing area in a tile-based video game

== Computing and technology ==
- Tile (company), a maker of tracking devices called tiles
- Tile, a computing unit in a tile processor
- Apache Tiles; see Java view technologies and frameworks

== Decorative art, interior design ==
- Fireclay Tile, a Northern California company manufacturing architectural tile
- National Tile Contractors Association

=== Building material tile ===
- Cement tile
- Glass tile
- Glazed architectural terra-cotta tile
- Malibu tile
- Medieval letter tile
- Porcelain tile
- Quarry tile
- Saltillo tile
- Uranium tile
- Vitrified tile
- Vinyl composition tile

== Other uses ==
- Tiles (band)
- Julio César Arzú (born 1954), a Honduran footballer nicknamed Tile
- Tile, an alternative name for the mythical land of Thule

== See also ==
- Tiler (Masonic)
- Tilera TILE64 a 64-way multi-core central processor unit
- Tiling (disambiguation)
- Tessellation, in computer graphics and mathematics
- Tyle (disambiguation)
