= Tiling =

Tiling may refer to:

- The physical act of laying tiles
- Tessellation, the mathematical analysis of covering a surface or higher-dimensional object with geometrical shapes

== Computing ==
- The compiler optimization of loop tiling
- Tiled rendering, the process of subdividing an image by regular grid
- Tiling window manager

== People ==
- Heinrich Sylvester Theodor Tiling (1818–1871), physician and botanist
- Reinhold Tiling (1893–1933), German rocket pioneer

== Other uses ==
- Neuronal tiling
- Tile drainage, an agriculture practice that removes excess water from soil
- Tiling (crater), a small, undistinguished crater on the far side of the Moon

== See also ==
- Brickwork
- Packing (disambiguation)
- Tiling puzzle
