= Malibu tile =

Ceramic tile

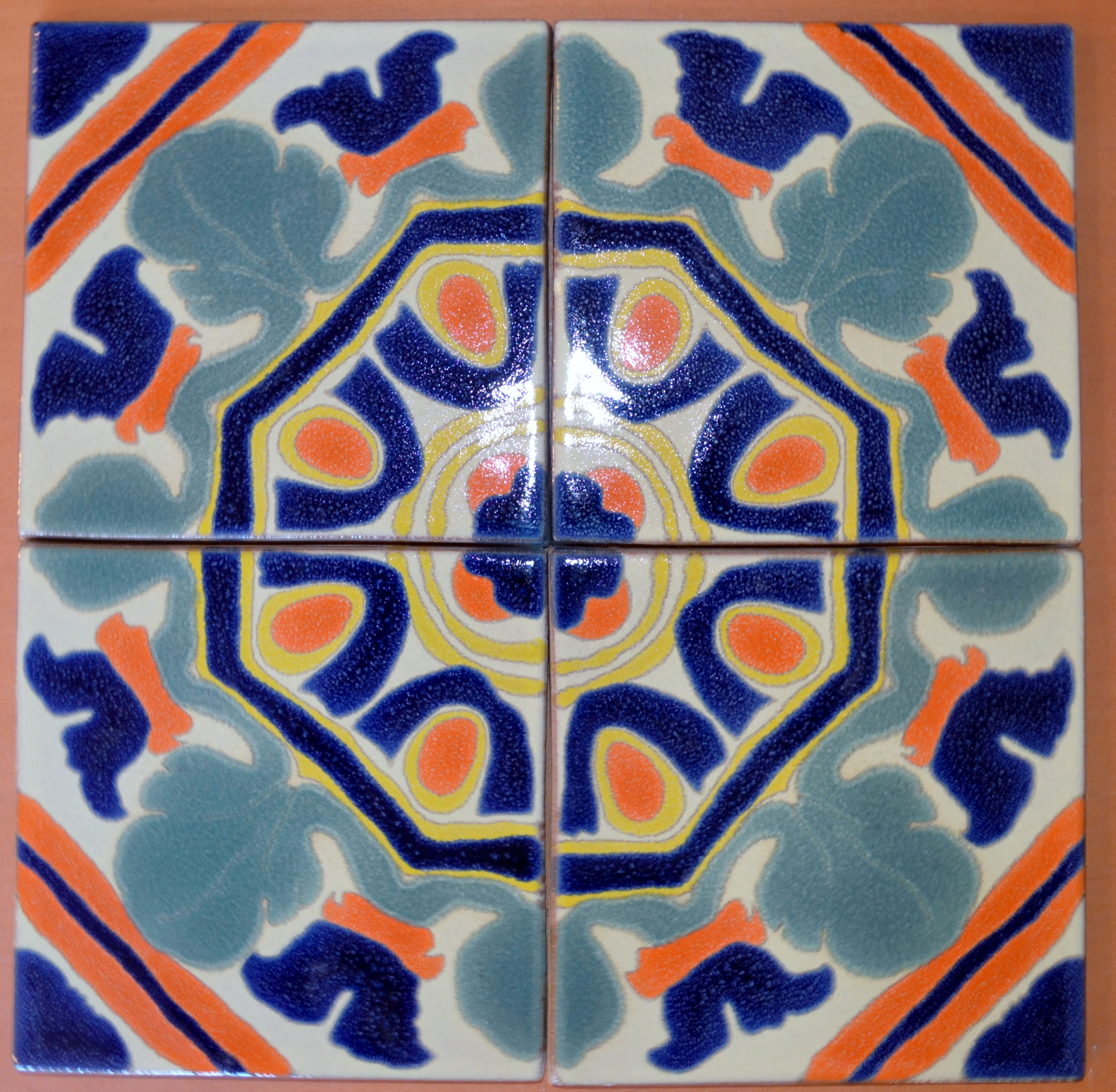
Replica in the style of Malibu Potteries. A Hispano-Moresque pattern on 4 tiles.

Malibu tile is a type of ceramic tile that takes its inspiration from the tiles that were produced at Malibu Potteries in Malibu, California, during the latter half of the 1920s. These tiles reflect a style of design that is referred to as Hispano-Moresque or Arabesque exhibiting bright contrasting glaze colors often in geometric patterns that are reminiscent of tiles produced many centuries ago in the Near and Middle East, North Africa and southern Spain. The Adamson House in Malibu, California, now the Malibu Lagoon Museum, contains the largest and most varied display of Malibu Potteries tile. The Adamson House was added to the National Register of Historic Places in 1977 and became a California Historical Landmark in 1985.

This type of tile was introduced to the American public in San Diego at the Panama California Exposition in 1915 as it adorned the Santa Fe Railroad Depot and what is now the Museum of Us. These tiles were produced by California China Products Company in National City and were designed by architectural firms in San Francisco and New York City, respectively. The aesthetic represented by these tiles had an immediate appeal to architects and homeowners as they blended beautifully into the increasing popular Spanish Colonial Revival architecture that had also been introduced at the exposition.

== History ==
A severe fire at the Malibu Potteries in 1931 led to the closure of the pottery the following year after only six years of production. Several of the tile makers found jobs at other tile companies in the Los Angeles area, some of which were making similar products. But the Great Depression curtailed construction and diminished the need and desire for decorative tiles. By the time the United States became engaged in World War II, almost all of the remaining tile works had either closed or shifted to producing products that supported the war effort. Another fire, this one a major wild fire in September 1970, swept through Malibu Canyon exposing in its aftermath a massive stash of Malibu Potteries tile heretofore unknown except to the heirs of the Potteries’ owners. Although unnoticed for several years, the vast majority of the tiles were unscathed by the fire. By the mid-70s rumors aroused interest in this unique collection and tiles began appearing in both publicly viewable installations and in private collections. Robert (Bob) Harris, a sound technician in the movie industry, found himself irresistibly attracted by the incomparable aesthetic qualities of the tiles and purchased a large collection.

=== Malibu Ceramic Works ===
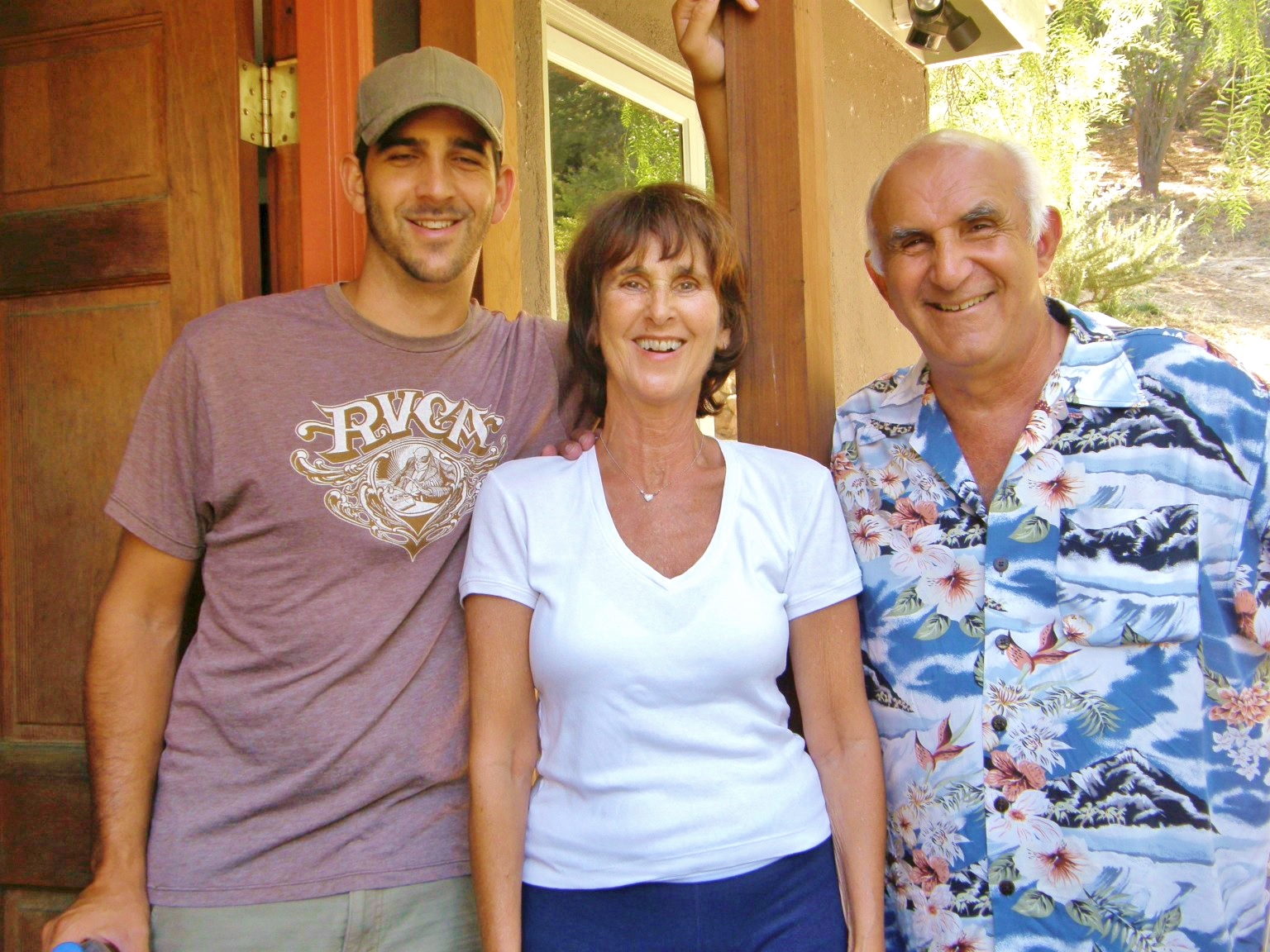
Malibu Ceramic Works; Matt, Roz and Bob Harris.

In 1979, using his collection of original tile from Malibu Potteries as inspiration, Harris founded Malibu Ceramic Works in Topanga Canyon and began the slow process of reverse engineering all of the steps in re-producing Malibu tile. The original tiles provided models of what made them popular: the sizes, the patterns and, maybe above all else, the glaze colors and their application. His goal was to reproduce a product comparable to the tiles produced at Malibu Potteries.

Within a year of the founding of this fledgling enterprise nestled precariously along Topanga Creek, an event took place in downtown Los Angeles that had a major impact on the public’s awareness of Malibu Potteries and its splendid array of ceramic products. A fellow collector, David Greenberg, another beneficiary of the stash of tiles left exposed following the fire of 1970, mounted an exhibition of his collection at the Craft and Folk Art Museum in Los Angeles, which opened in June 1980 accompanied by a colorful catalog of objects. The impact on the development and success of Malibu Ceramic Works cannot be underestimated. In time, Harris was able to replicate nearly all of the many ceramic tile and related products of Malibu Potteries by developing processes and techniques, some advantaged by modern technology, while others still relying on old-fashioned artisan methods. Many companies currently producing Malibu style tile use the methods and techniques that Harris recreated.

== Original patterns ==
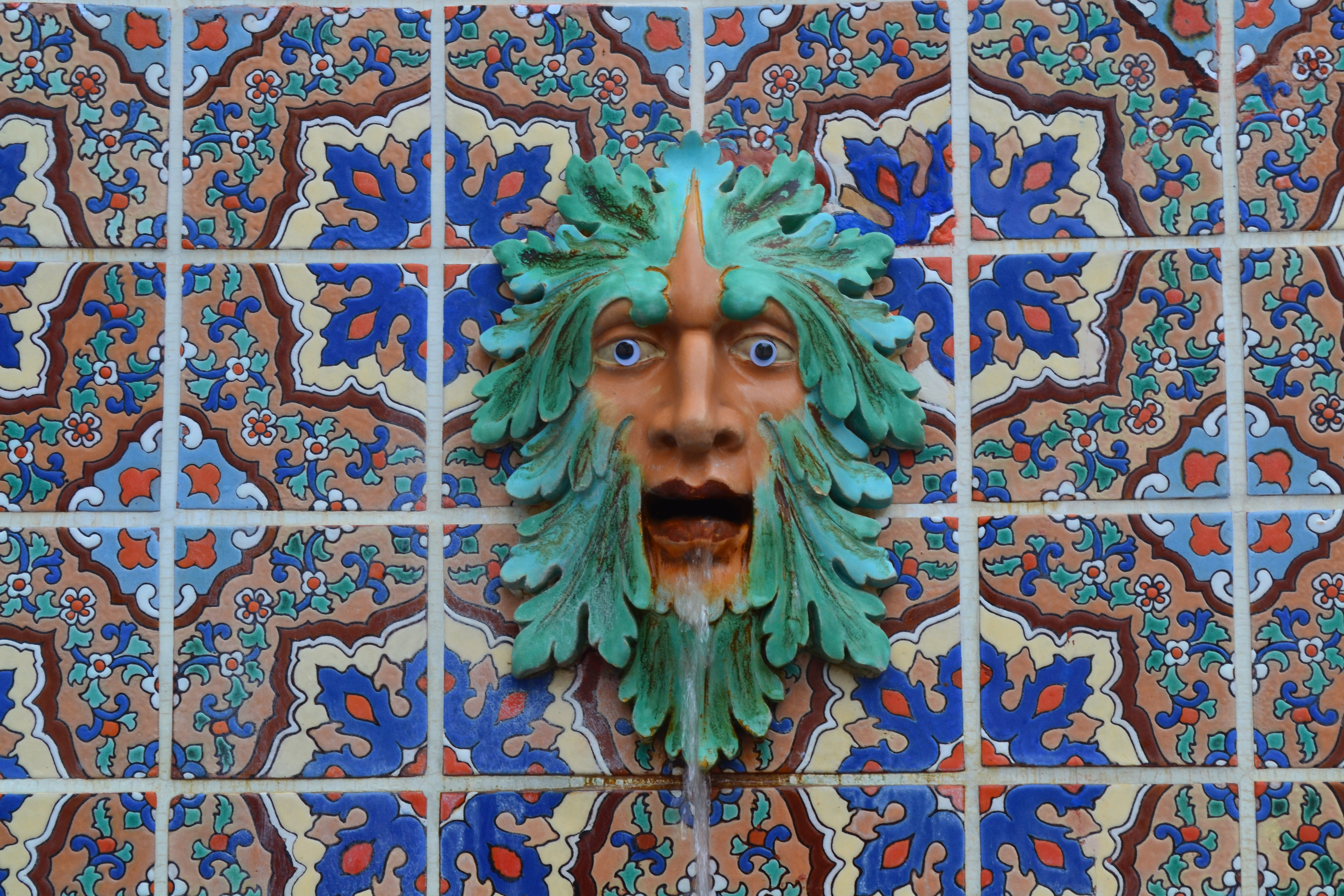
Malibu Potteries Eternal Man on the grounds of the Adamson House

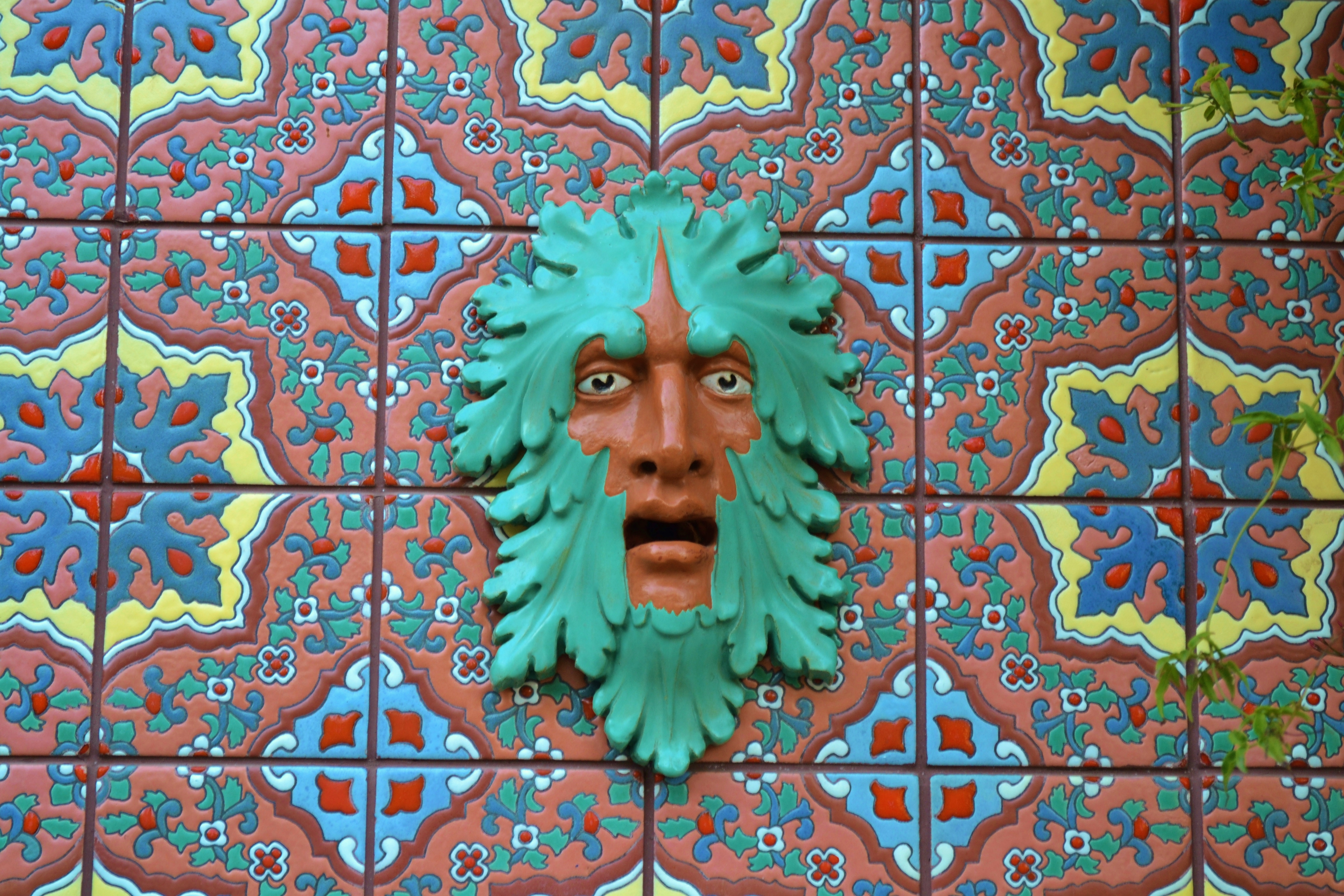
Replica of Eternal Man

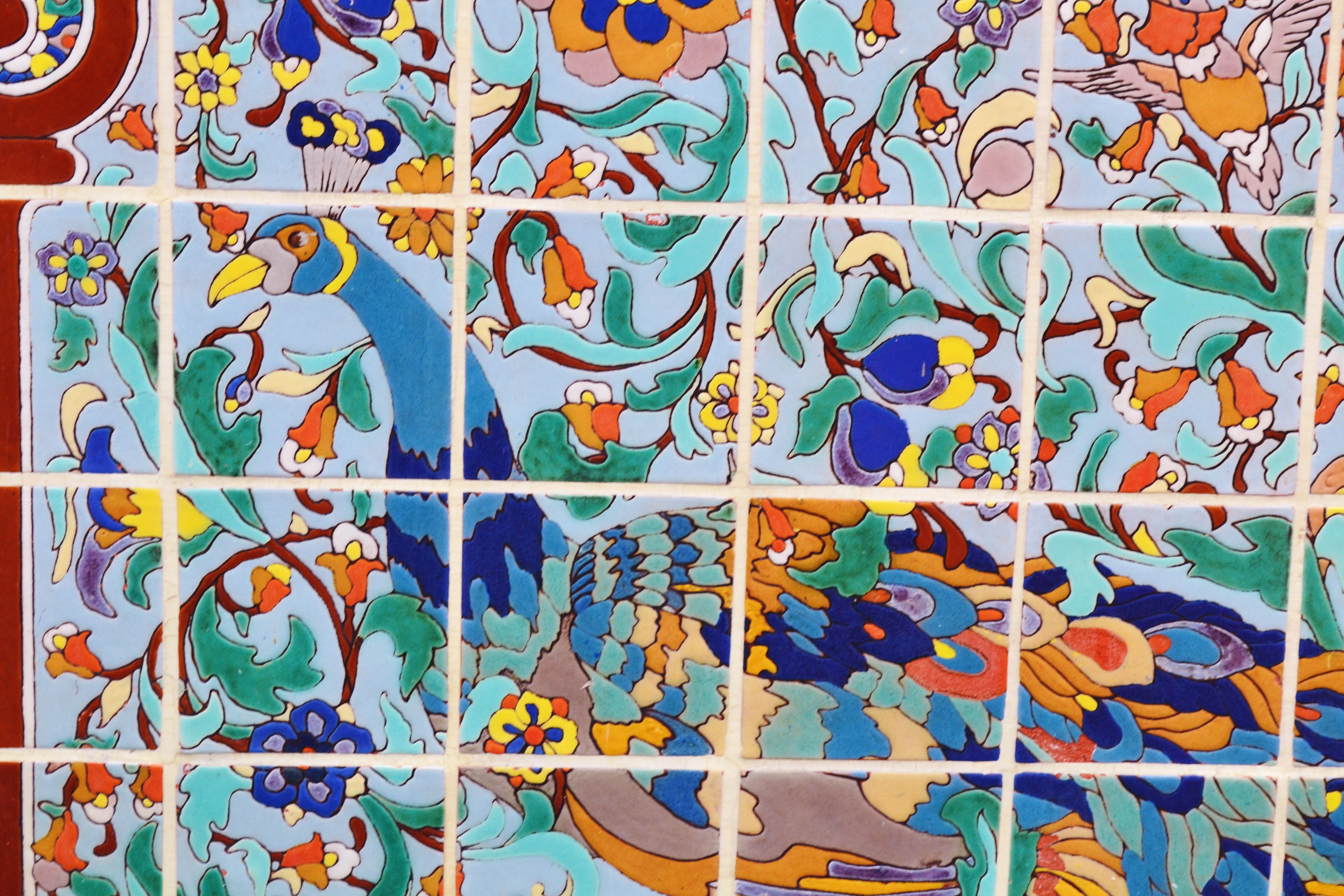
Malibu Potteries Peacock fountain, Adamson House

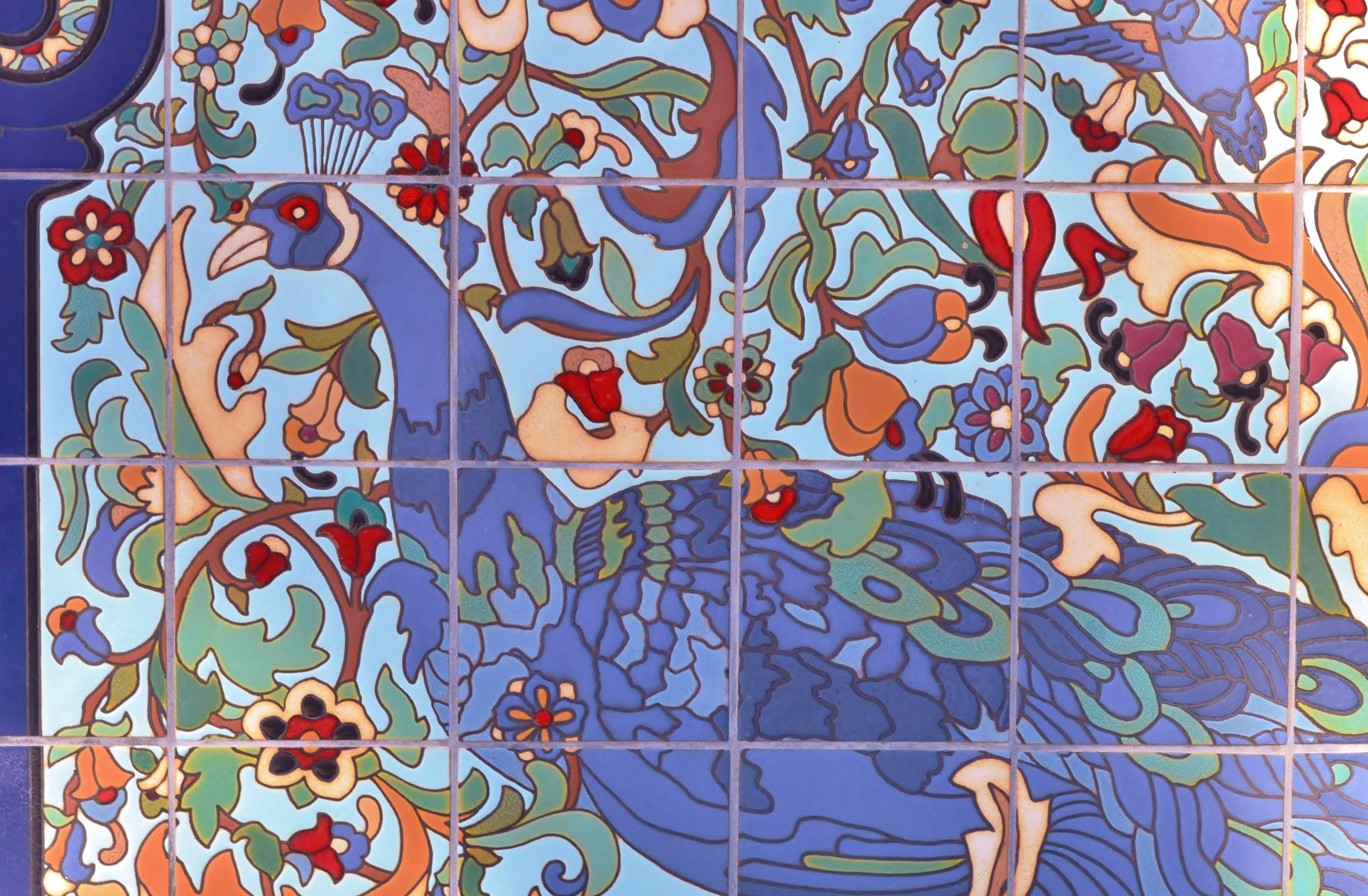
Replica of peacock fountain

In the case of the 'Green Man' or 'Eternal Man' on display at the Adamson House in Malibu, a replica was created by making a mold from the original Green Man fountain, including a fully functional water spout. That clay mold is still used to make green man fountains. Many 21st century artisans have also recreated variations on one of the most popular murals, the 'Peacock' fountain that is found in the rear courtyard of the Adamson House. Despite exposure to the elements, these early 20th century tiles still much of their original color and aesthetic features.

== Production ==
=== Clay production ===
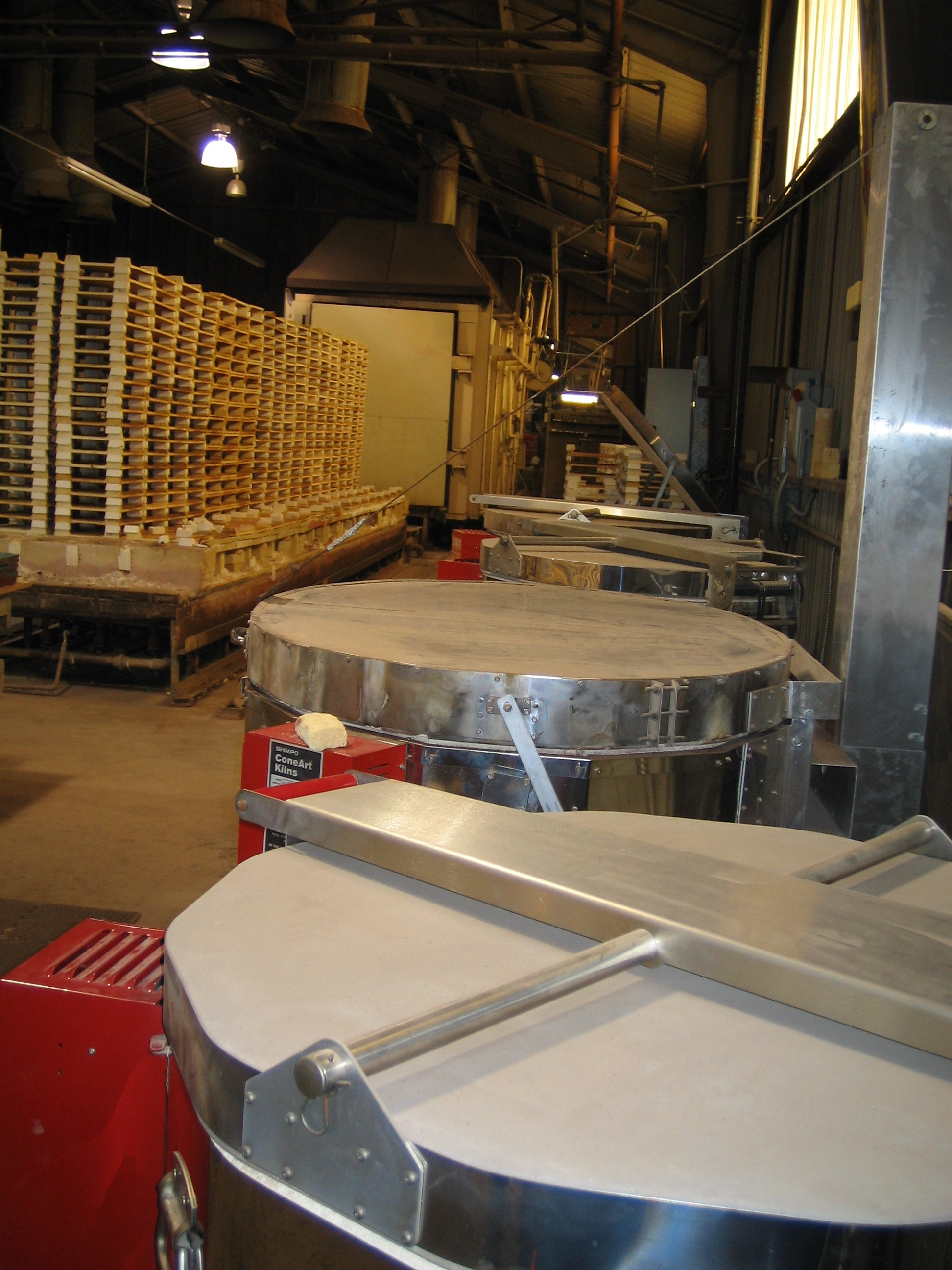
Shows cart-loading kilns for bulk firing

The first step in producing ceramic tile is making the clay body on which patterns of glazes can be applied and then heated to a high temperature in a kiln. In the Spanish Revival tradition, dark red is the standard clay, although Malibu Potteries did create buff clay bodies on occasion. Ultimately Harris purchased a tile manufacturing plant in Long Beach, California which would produce the smaller "deco" tile as well as the traditional red floor tile which is one hallmark of Malibu style tile. Malibu Potteries produced a wide array of floor tile, in a variety of shapes and patterns, including hexagon and octagon that were installed in geometric patterns, ranging from simple to complex. Geometric patterns were typical of the original Saracen and Spanish floors as illustrated by the picture of a patio at the Adamson House and detailed in multiple vicissitudes in the Malibu Potteries Catalog. Malibu Ceramic Works floor tiles are comparable to those of Malibu Potteries since both achieve a high level of hardness that is needed when used for purposes of public foot traffic, back splashes, stair risers, and other daily use functions. These floor tiles can be contrasted with common floor tiles used in Southern California, which are known as Mexican pavers, but which do not have the same dark red tones and would seem to be lacking in the same degree of strength and durability.

=== Extruding clay ===
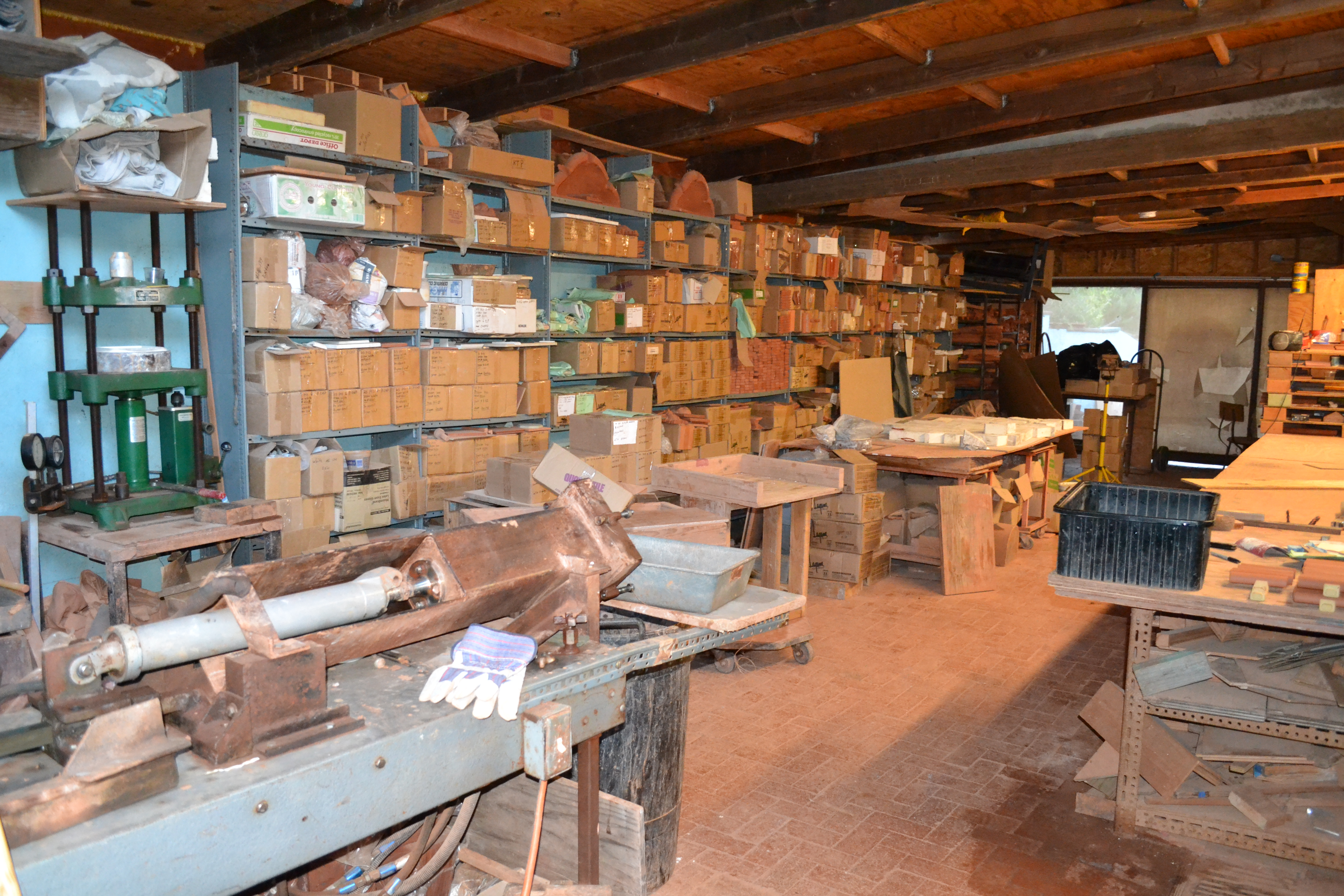
Tile Extrusion machine

Another way to make key elements of ceramic tile in the Spanish Revival tradition is through the process of extrusion. Unfired clay, usually dark red clay in the Spanish Revival tradition, is pushed under high pressure through a die or mold that extrudes a certain shape. After the pieces are extruded, they either glazed and fired or just fired, thereby retaining their dark red color. As illustrated in the original Malibu Potteries catalog, such shapes included quarter rounds and bullnose, and other shapes that finished the edge of tiles or enabled the tile to change directions, as can be seen in the pictures below of the bench and in the Star fountain. Contemporary ceramicists can replicate the original extruded pieces using modern machinery such as a Western Claymachinery, model SE10 extruding machine.

=== Silk screening ===
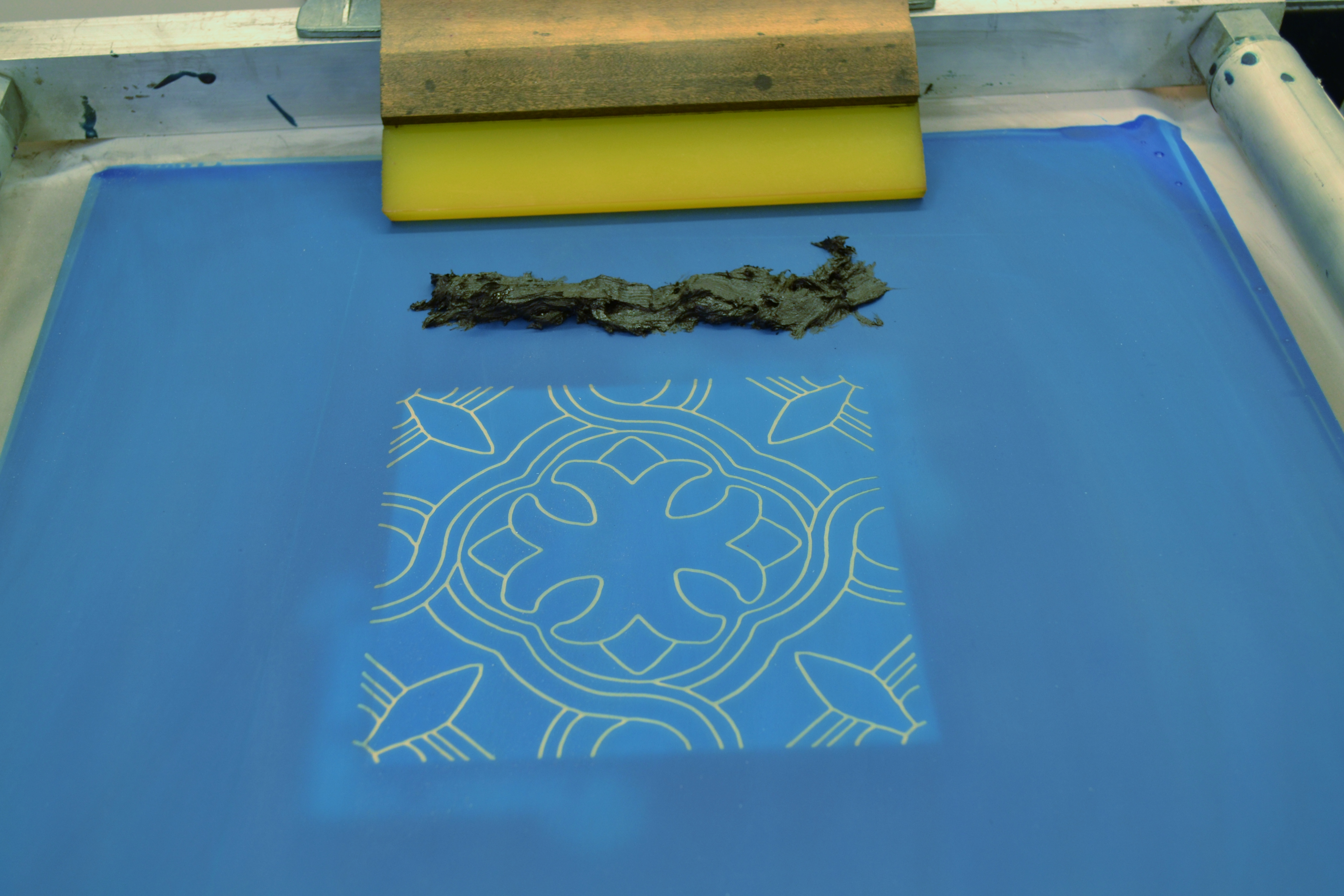
Silk screen set up to apply resist material

Malibu Potteries was an early adopter of one method to apply the black line resist to tiles: silk screening. The technology of silk screening advanced substantially by the late 20th Century, making the process of replicating Malibu tile more consistent compared to hand painting each tile.

Silk screens are created by printing a black outline on a sheet of clear acetate, such as with an ink jet printer, then burning the image onto a frame holding a polyester sheet on which a plastic-like emulsion has been applied. Exposing the emulsion to light causes the emulsion to dry or "fix," while the emulsion directly underneath the black lines on the acetate remain soft and unfixed. When the silk screen is "washed out" by a hose, or even power-washed, the emulsion directly under the black outline of the image is vacated, leaving a porous outline. The black line, semi-liquid can now be pushed, usually with a squeegee, through the porous outline onto a piece of tile. Good silk screens are extremely useful in that, once created, the pattern can be applied repeatedly to many tiles, of course, even changing the colors for any given project.

=== Black line resist ===
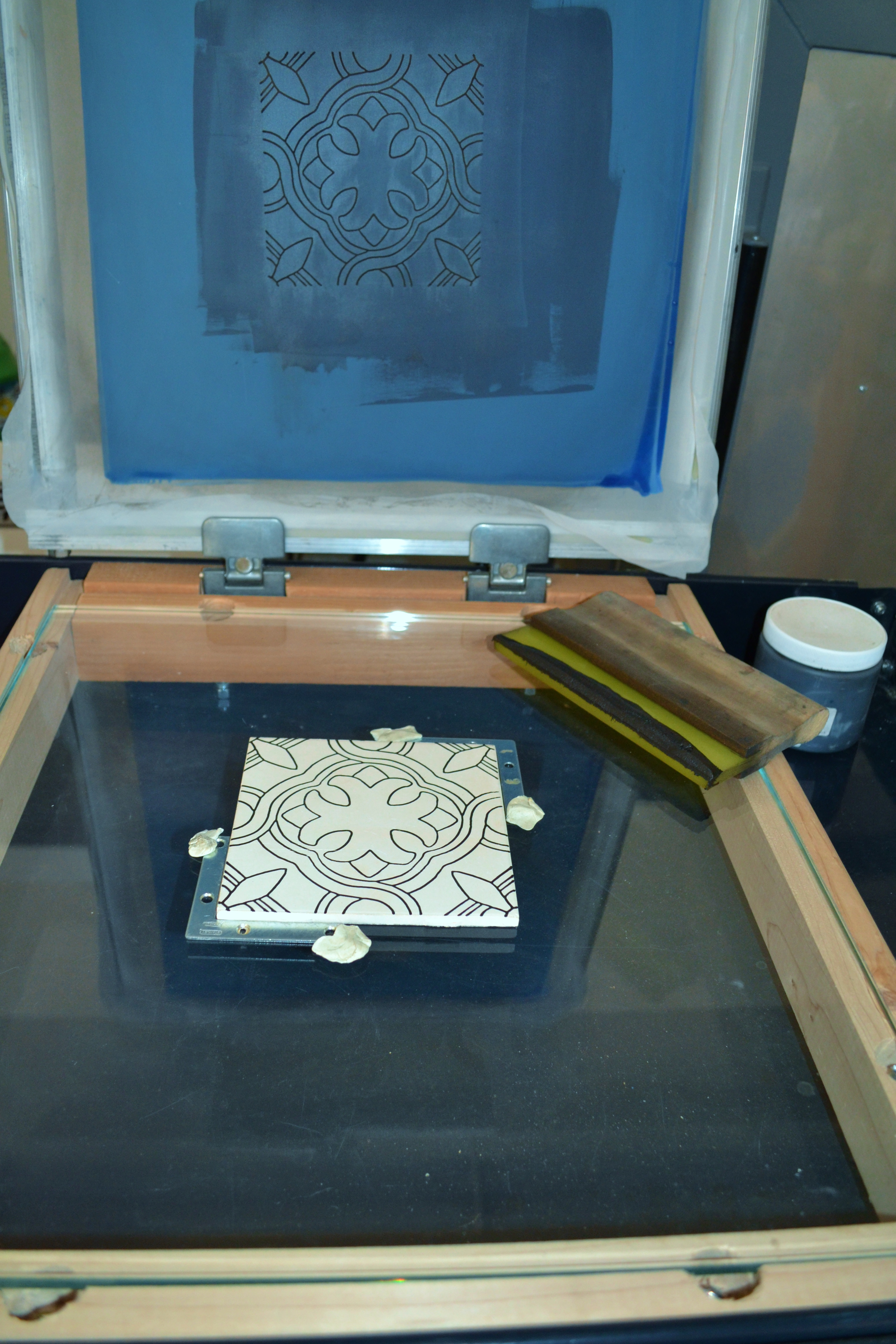
Pattern is applied to a bisque tile by pushing black line through silkscreen

Malibu Potteries relied extensively on hand painted artwork and the hands-on technique of painting tile with brushes. Today artisans have at their disposal many tools that improve upon the process of creating the image on the tile. One of the most useful is the creation and editing made possible in software programs, such as Adobe Photoshop.With such graphics programs one can develop black and white outlines that constitute the art work of the cuerda seca style of tile. In the cuerda seca, or 'dry line' technique as it is also known, an outline of a pattern is created on a tile with the wet ceramic glazes being applied with drip bottles, such as an ear dropper for infants. The black line creates a barrier or "resist," keeping the glazes inside the lines and, when the tile is fired, the black lines also form an attractive outline of the pattern.

The exact composition of the black line ingredients is somewhat of an industry secret, in general, yet also variable among the current, practicing artisans. As reported in various sources, Malibu Potteries used "a finely pulverized manganese oxide mixed with a medium viscosity mineral oil". Today many companies offer a variety of water-based and oil-based products which they state will form a resist barrier for glazes. Large companies, such as Axner, Laguna, Aftosa and Duncan, all offer various products that can be used in creating a resist line for cuerda seca style tile. A recent Masters thesis empirically compares several off-the-shelf products with variations of the original formula.

=== Making glazes ===
One of the most evident characteristics of original Malibu Potteries' tile is the bright and vibrant colors that were used. Rufus Keller, who tested and created the ceramic glazes, is known to have kept the formulas for these glazes in a personal note book which was recorded in his own code.

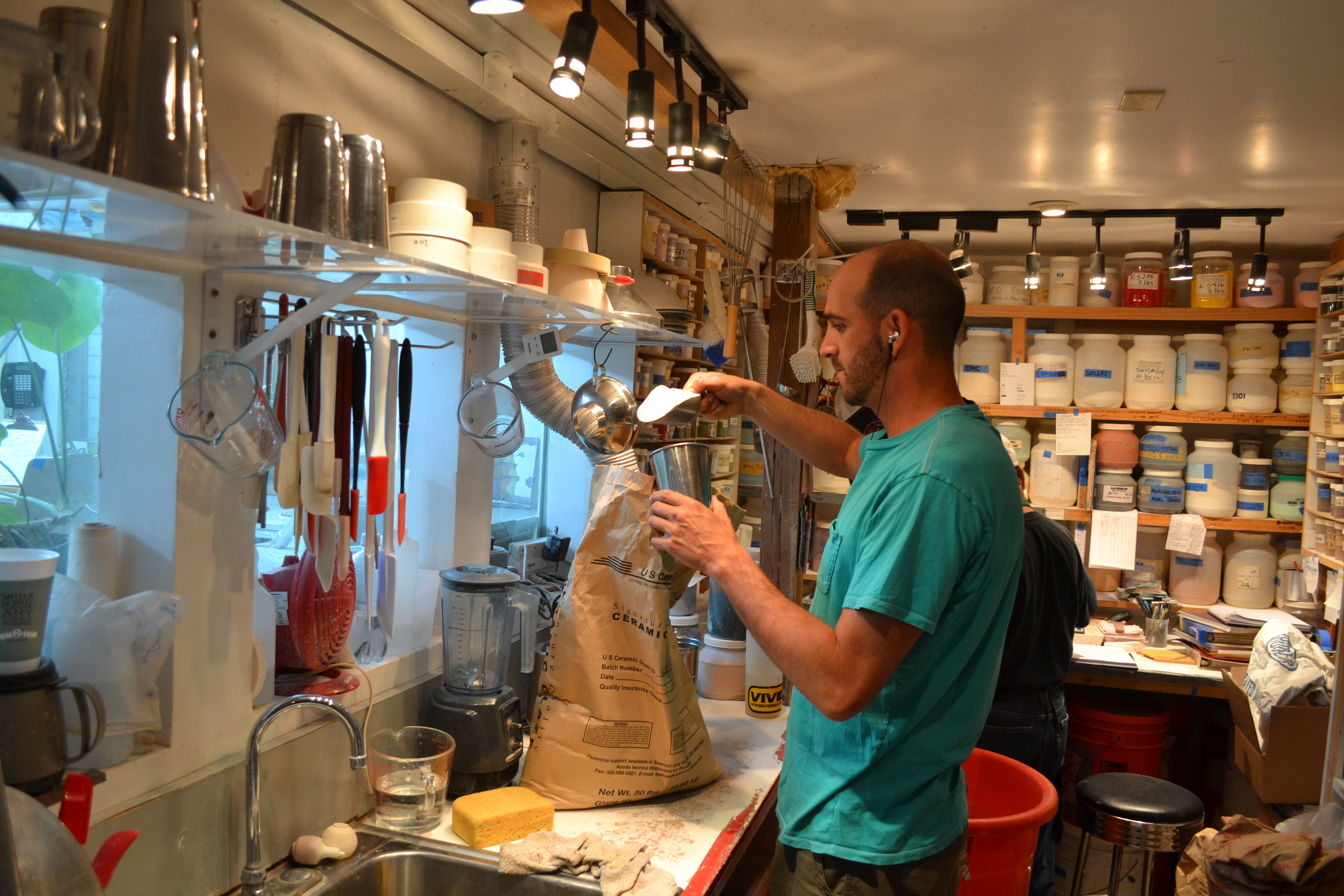
Making glazes involves mixing a dry base glaze with stains (colors) and water

At Malibu Potteries, the glazes were mixed in an 'off-limits' room that was known as the "holy of holies".

A lot more was known about making ceramic glazes when contemporaries attempted to replicate the hundreds of colors and finishes that were created by Rufus Keeler. Nonetheless, modern ceramicists have re-created the bright and vibrant colors often used in Malibu tile such as bright orange, deep red, lush greens, yellows, and cobalt blue. Even with modern advantages, creating custom colors and finishes requires a good deal of testing, especially when one must consider the chemical interaction between the clay body and the ceramic glaze. Just as Malibu Potteries offered a wide a wide array of glazes where the surface might be glossy, matte, or crackled, contemporary ceramicists have successfully reverse engineered virtually all of the glazes originally produced by Malibu Potteries, and then some. Some illustrations of these types of glazes are seen in the pictures that follow.

=== Application of glazes ===
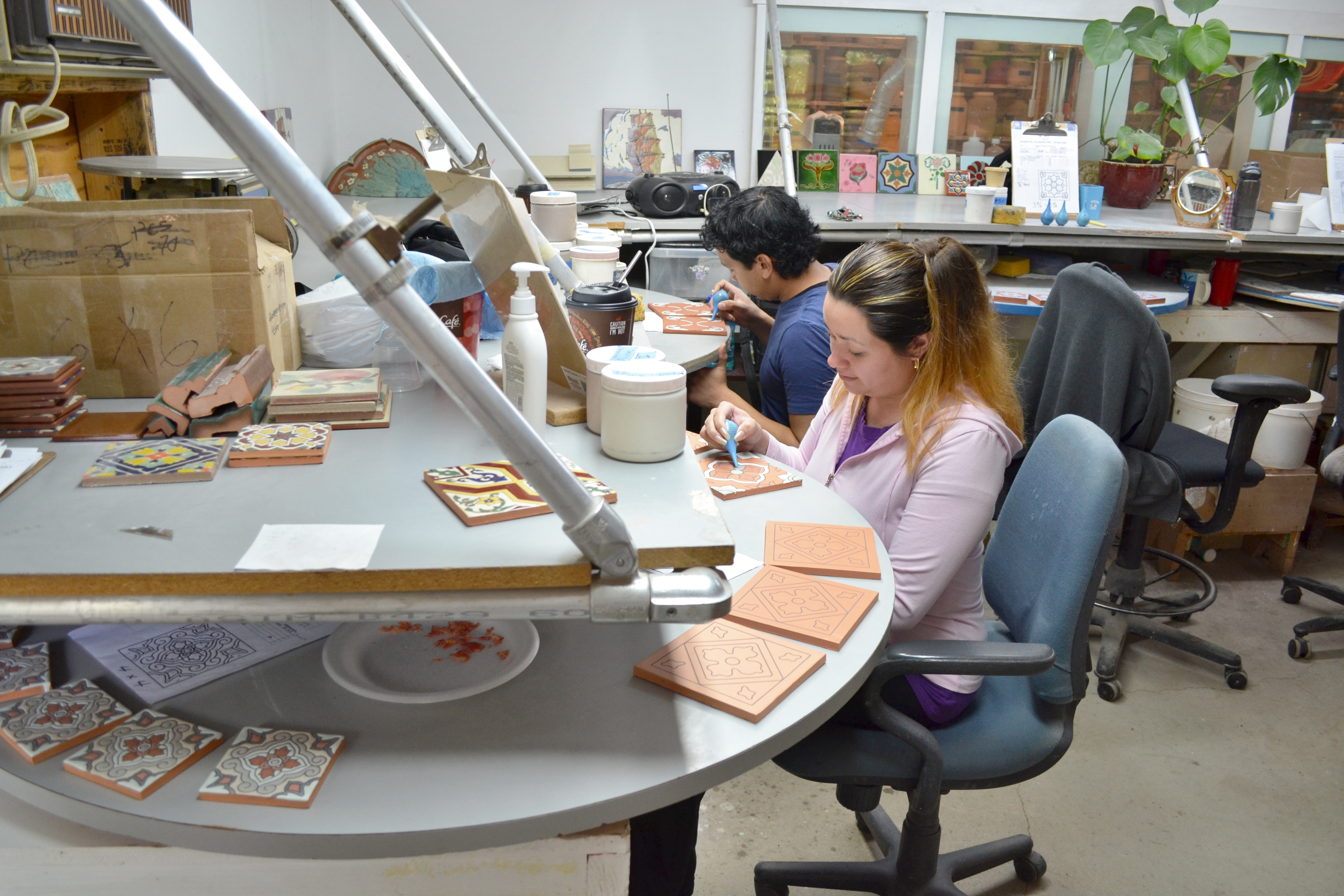
Application of glazes virtually unchanged since 1930

Just as early photographs show workers at Malibu Potteries, usually women, applying glazes to bisque tile having resist patterns, modern ceramicists rely upon virtually the same technique. Tile with resist lines circulate on a Lazy Susan while 'glazers' use bulb syringes to squeeze the wet glaze onto the tile. Since unfired glaze does not necessarily look the same color as a fired glaze, a schematic is usually close by to identify where the appropriate glaze goes on the tile. Glazers with steady hands and a good attention span produce tiles with consistent edges and infrequent run-over.

=== Kiln firing ===
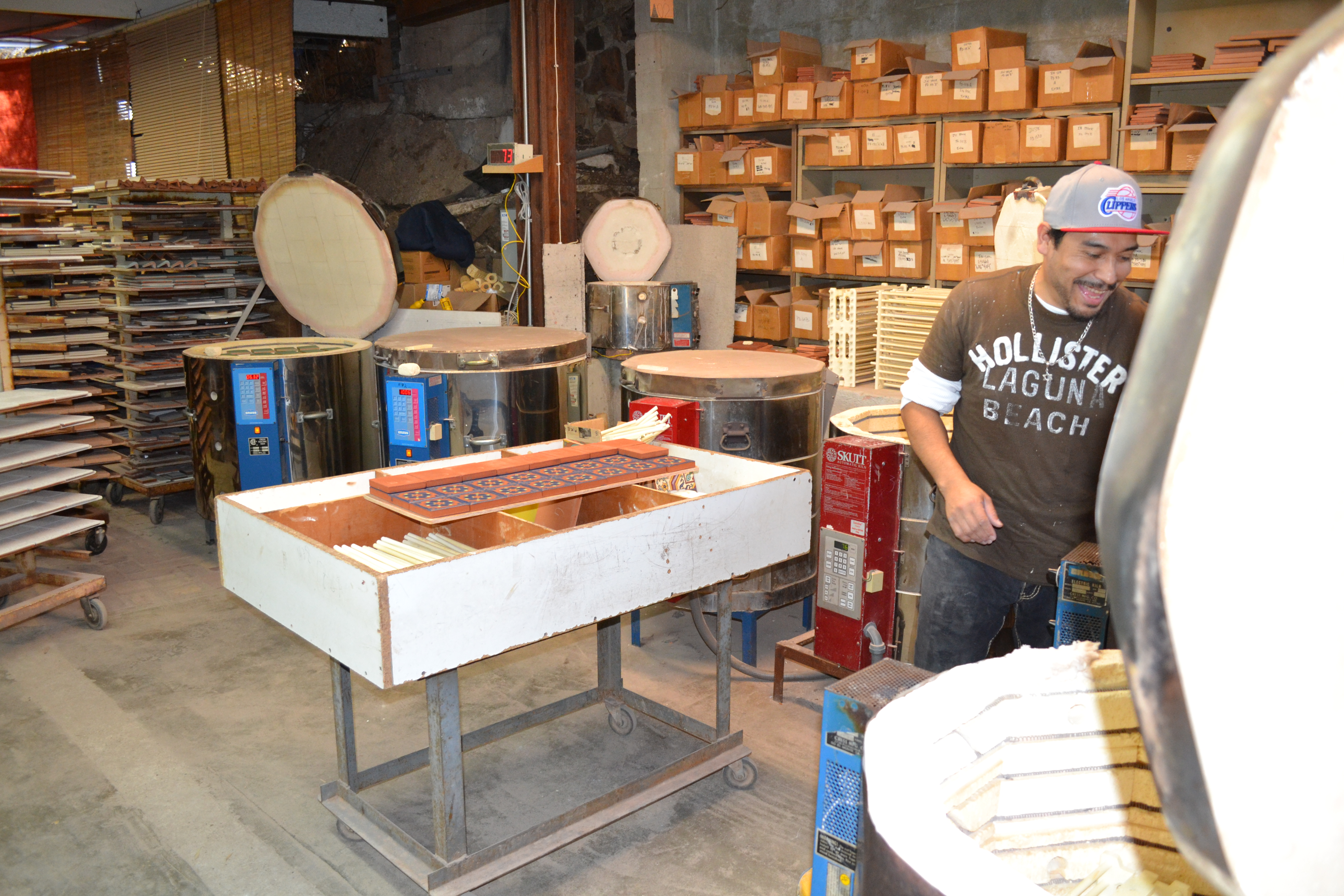
Firing room with multiple kilns

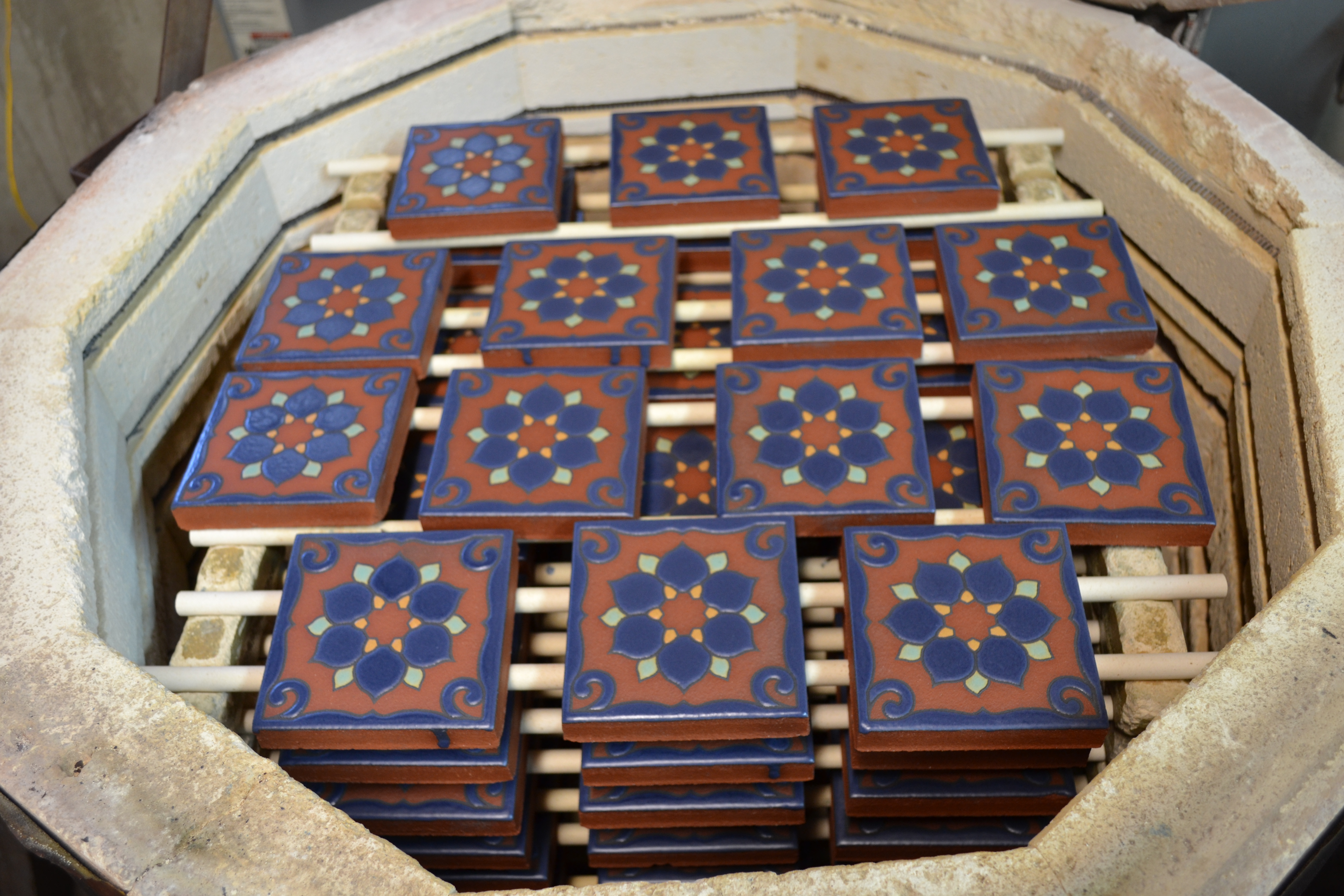
Loaded kiln after firing

Malibu Potteries built its factory on an idyllic location, right next to the Malibu pier on the sandy beach. To be able to produce large quantities of tile, Malibu Potteries created an immense kiln which was run on diesel fuel. Their firing process required extensive use of fuel because they fired their tile at 1900° which took 24 hours and which required another full day to cool down With today's technology, there are a wide array of kilns available, especially electric kilns, that can be operated more efficiently and provide greater control.

The modern-day kiln uses a computer-like controller that makes the firing progress more predictable and controllable than in years' past. The user sets such variables as ramp rate to achieve the final, desired temperature and holds, where the temperature is held for period of time, as well as, the overall time of the firing. With programs built into most controllers, modern kilns do not require much actual knowledge of how a kiln operates, nor do they require much monitoring. While Malibu Potteries tile was fired to a very high temperature over a long period of time, today's tile tends to be fired at lower temperatures for a shorter period of time. Temperatures typically range from cone 06 (1816°) to cone 10 (2345°). Cone 06 tile is less hard or dense so is generally less resistant to such things as water and freezing, while cone 10 tile reach vitrification and are known to be extremely strong and suitable for applications everywhere, including floors, showers and kitchens. Tile at the entrance to the Adamson House, for example, have been exposed to a west-facing sun, salty air on the beach since 1930, and they still retain a high level of brilliance and structural integrity.

== Installations ==
Poppy pattern by Malibu Potteries

Contemporary replica of poppy pattern

Malibu style tile are installed in a variety of places but are easily recognizable to anyone with a basic knowledge of them. The basic tile, a "deco" for decorative, is square 4" by 4" or 6" by 6." These tiles are often installed on archways, entries, towers, balconies, loggias, and fountains creating a "Mediterranean ambiance". Another style of tile is the linear tile where the pattern continues to its left and to its right, as one might find on a border for the floor or on top row of a wainscot.

The poppy tiles illustrate a common difference in the technique for keeping the glazed colors separate from one another: the cuerda seca technique versus the cuenca or tub tile technique where there is a raised pattern stamped into the tile when it is still wet. The raised pattern serves as a physical barrier to hold the glaze in place as opposed to the black line resist which is typically held in place by the chemical reaction between oil and water.

=== Benches ===
Another application for Malibu tile is on a bench. Malibu tile are ideal because the surface is both durable and typically smooth which means that the tile can be used to create benches in a variety of settings, public and private indoors and out doors.

=== Fountains ===
Fountains are another application of Malibu tile. These fountains have been done in a variety of shapes, such as, the "star-fountain" at the Adamson House. Malibu tile distinguish themselves not only by their customary bright colors and patterns but also by being incredibly strong, resisting the weather or constant flow of water.

=== Murals ===
Another application of Malibu tile is found in murals. Malibu Potteries created a variety of installations, from the peacock fountain to art that clearly reflected on the early Spanish settlers, such as Spanish galleons and flamenco dancers. Designs ranged from representational figures to stylized patterns such as the Spanish galleon at sunset. That mural is a reproduction of a mural that is currently installed at the Serra Retreat, which was damaged from the fire that leveled much of the retreat and ruined a horde of Malibu Potteries' tile that May Rindge had stored there.

=== Gallery ===
Reproduction of Spanish Galleon

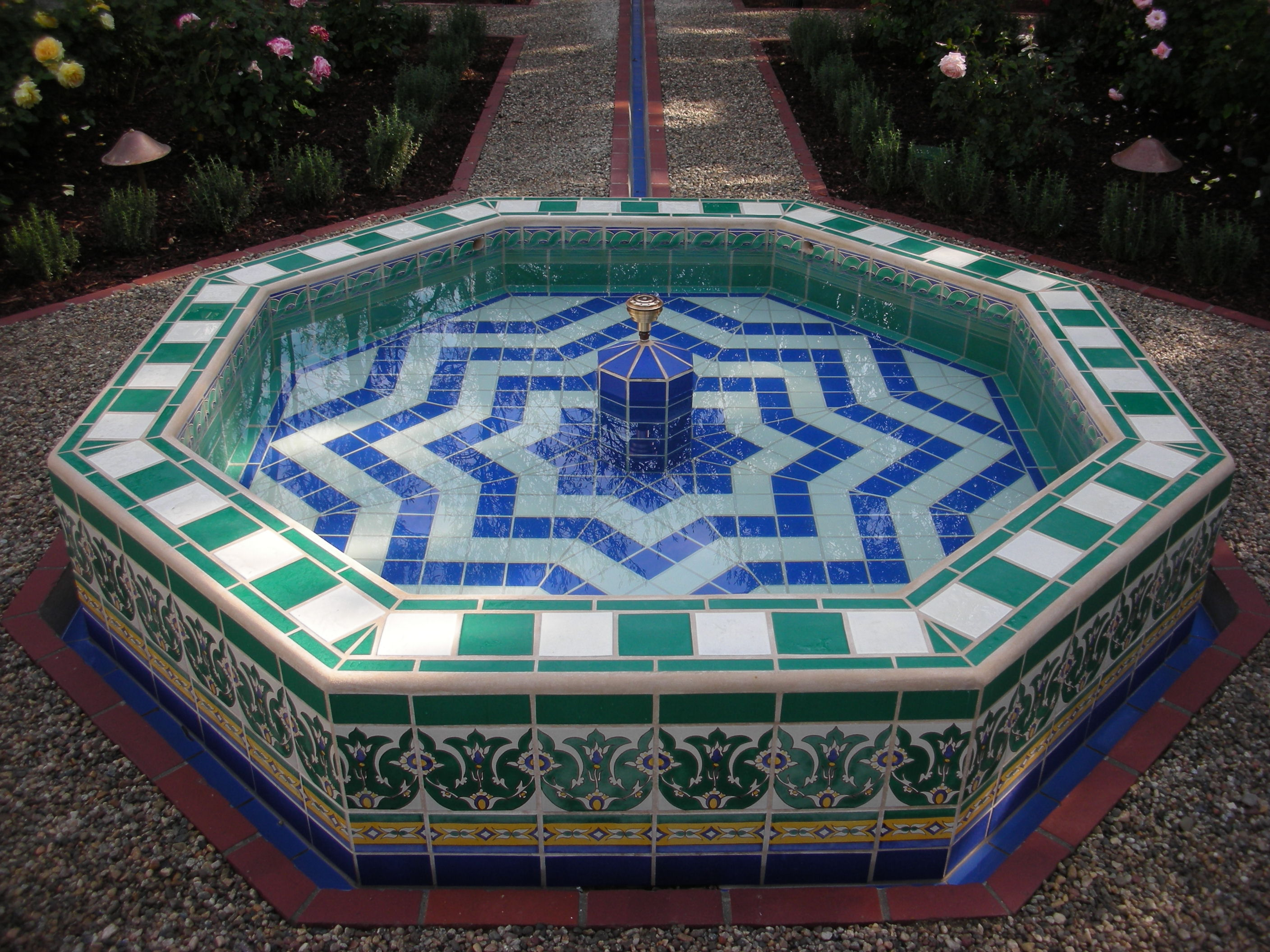
Contemporary star-fountain illustrating Islamic influence

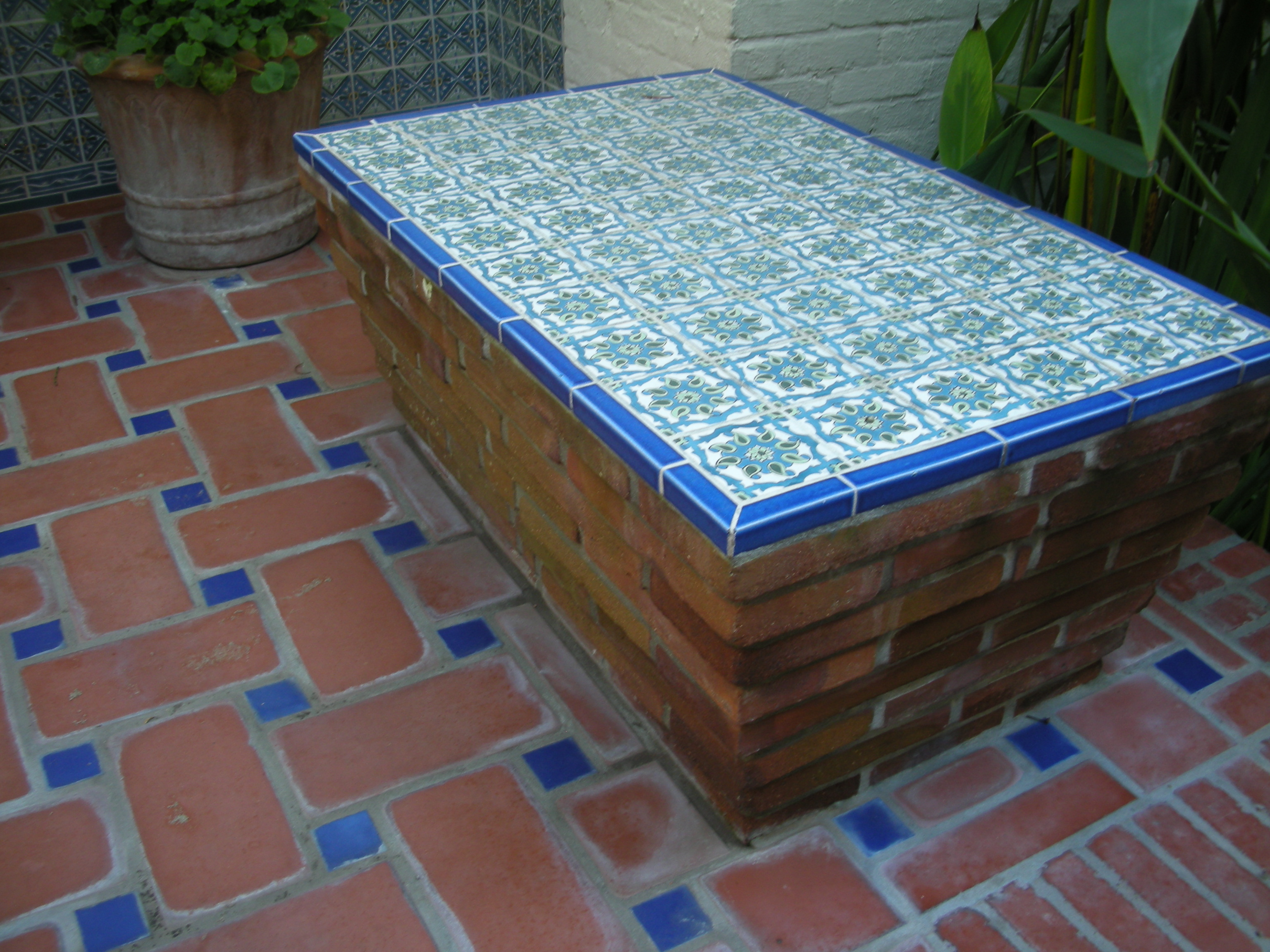
Contemporary use of Malibu style tile with red brick

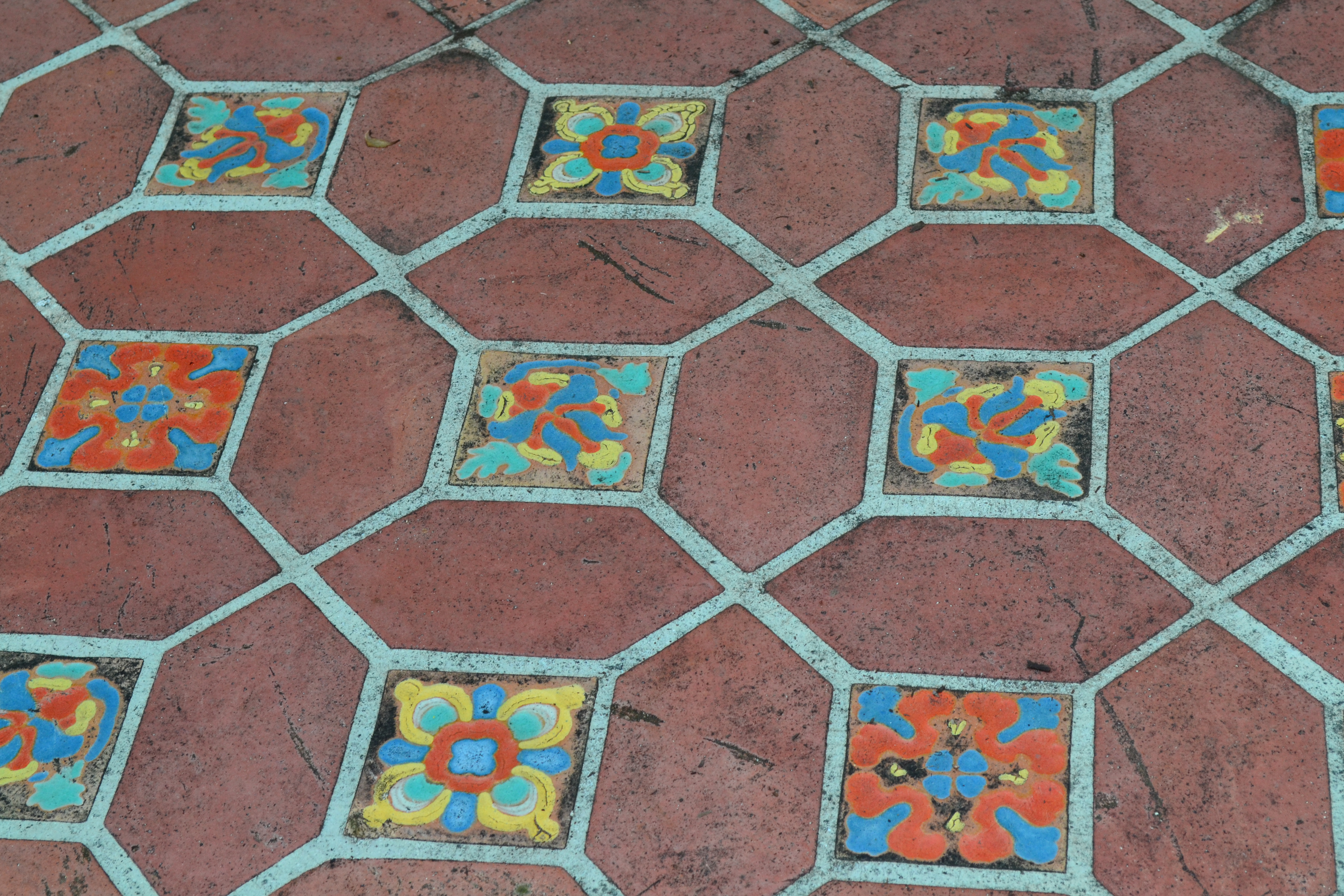
External Patio, Adamson House

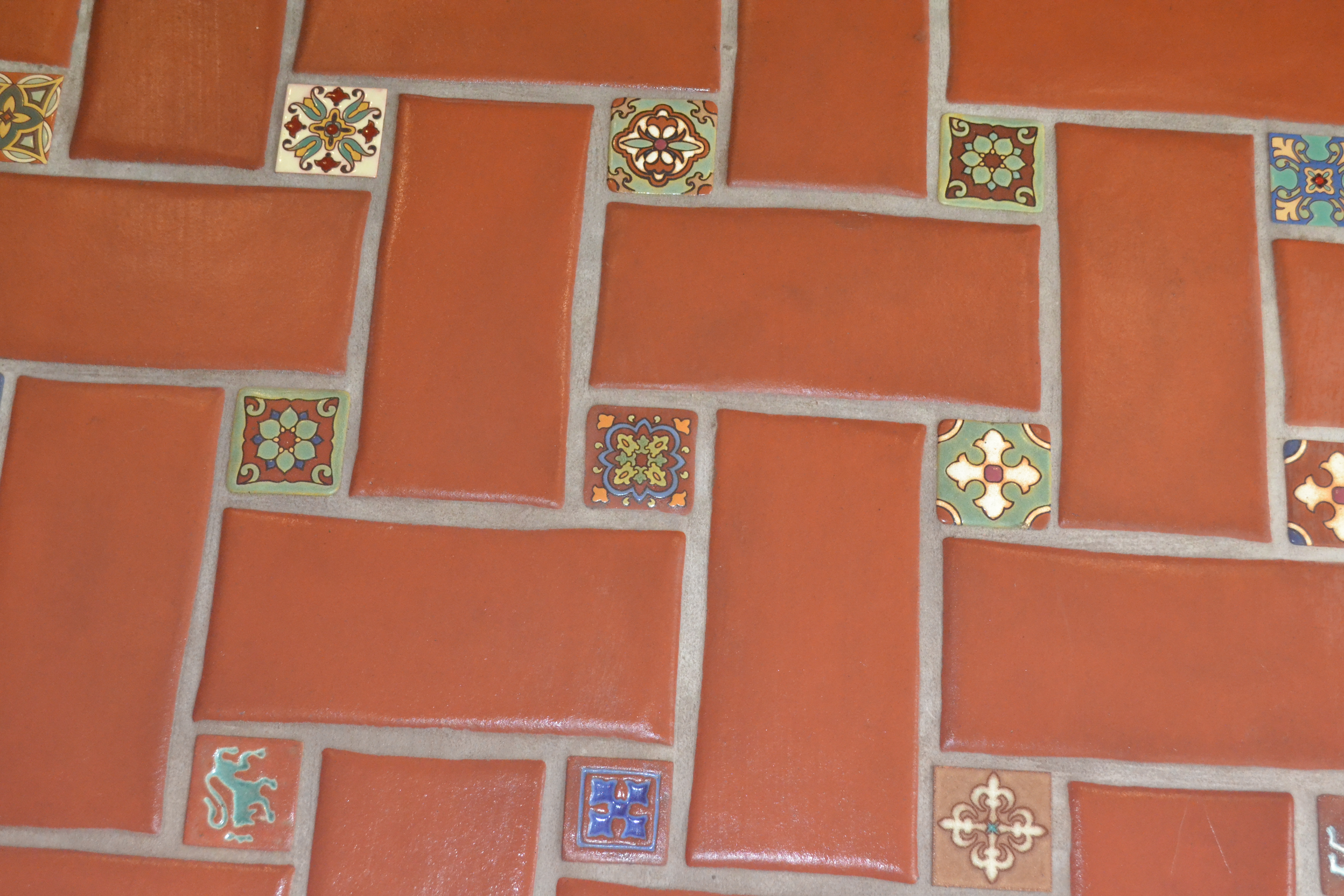
Contemporary use of terra cotta and decorative tile

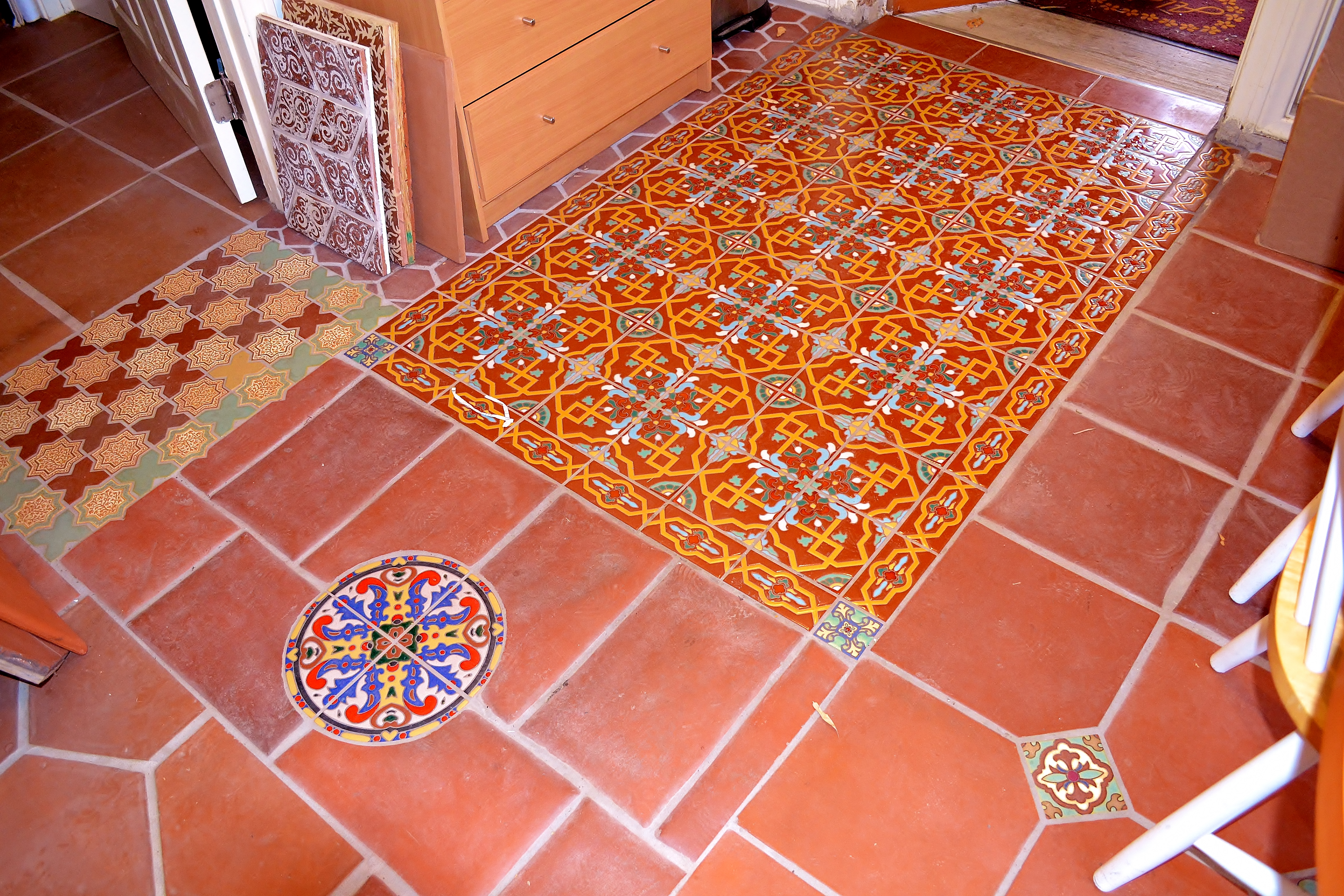
Contemporary use of mixed patterns of floor tile
