= Tyle =

Tyle may refer to:

- Chris Tyle (born 1955), American musician
- Tyle Mill, a mill near Sulhamstead, England
- Tyle or Tylis, the 3rd century capital of a Balkan Celtic state
- 21970 Tyle, a minor planet

== See also ==
- Tile
- Tyler (disambiguation)
