= Tiling (crater) =

Crater on the Moon

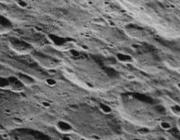
- Oblique Lunar Orbiter 5 image, facing west
- Coordinates: 53.1°S 132.6°W
- Diameter: 38 km
- Depth: Unknown
- Colongitude: 132° at sunrise
- Eponym: Reinhold Tiling

Tiling is a small, undistinguished crater on the far side of the Moon, named after Reinhold Tiling, a German engineer and rocket pioneer. It is located just over one crater diameter to the north-northeast of the prominent crater Fizeau. The outer rim of Tiling is worn and rounded, with a small craterlet along the western edge. The interior floor is relatively level and featureless, with only a small craterlet along the eastern edge and inner wall.

To the north-northeast of Tiling and running towards the northeast is a broken groove in the surface. Several such features lie in the irregular terrain to the east and northeast of Tiling, and these are all radial to the Mare Orientale impact basin farther to the northeast.

== Satellite craters ==
By convention these features are identified on lunar maps by placing the letter on the side of the crater midpoint that is closest to Tiling.

Tiling	Latitude	Longitude	Diameter
C	50.4° S	129.7° W	21 km
D	52.0° S	131.2° W	34 km
F	52.3° S	129.0° W	17 km
G	53.0° S	128.6° W	14 km
