= Reinhold Tiling =

German engineer, pilot and rocket pioneer

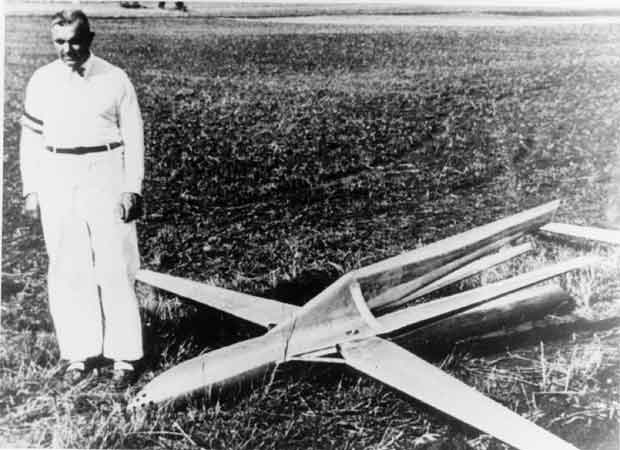
- Tiling next to a rocket
- Born: 13 June 1893; Absberg, Kingdom of Bavaria, German Empire
- Died: 11 October 1933 (aged 40); Osnabrück, Germany
- Occupations: Engineer; pilot; rocket pioneer
- Known for: First German postal rocket

Reinhold Tiling (13 June 1893 – 11 October 1933) was a German engineer, pilot and rocket pioneer. A flier in the First World War and later flight director of an Osnabrück airfield, he took up rocketry in the late 1920s and built solid-propellant rockets, patenting a "chamber rocket" in 1928. In 1931 he launched what has been called the first German postal rocket. Tiling died in 1933 of burns suffered when powder exploded in his rocket workshop near Bad Essen; the lunar crater Tiling is named after him.

== Biography ==
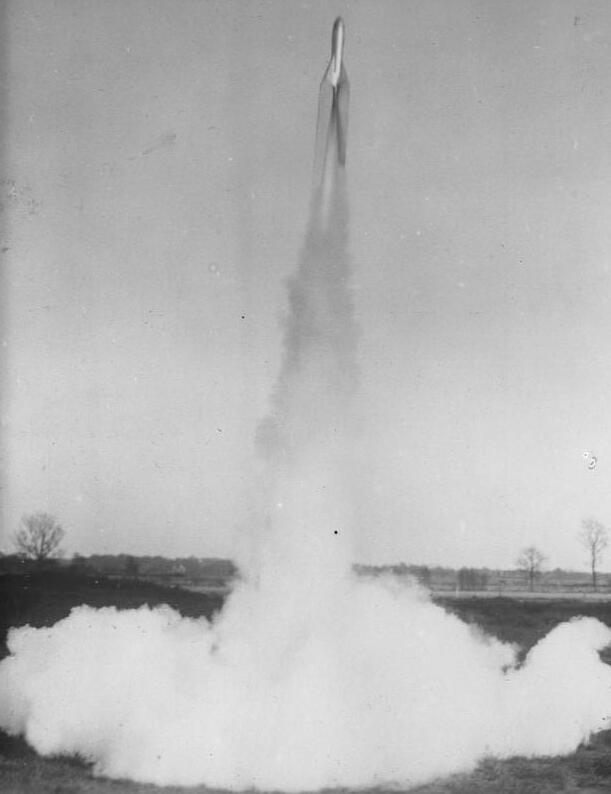
Tiling's postal rocket, 1931

Tiling was born on 13 June 1893 in Absberg, in the Kingdom of Bavaria, and served as a pilot during the First World War.

In 1926 he became flight director and technical manager of the Netterheide airfield in Osnabrück. Tiling took up rocketry in the late 1920s, registering a patent in 1928 for a solid-propellant chamber rocket (Kammerrakete) and another for a "rocket aircraft with swing-out wings" intended to glide back to the ground after flight.

With financial backing from Baron Gisbert von Ledebur, Tiling carried out his research between 1929 and 1933 at the Arenshorst estate near Bad Essen. He launched his first rocket at Meppen in the summer of 1929, after many failed attempts. On 15 April 1931, at the Dümmer, he launched what the state archive of Lower Saxony describes as the first German postal rocket; one of his rockets carried a bundle of 188 numbered and autographed postcards. Tiling became widely known in Germany and gave many public flight demonstrations. He later leased a test site on the island of Wangerooge for further trials.

On 10 October 1933, while powder was being pressed to fill a rocket in his workshop at Schloss Arenshorst, overheating set off an explosion. Tiling, his assistant Angela Buddenböhmer and his mechanic Friedrich Kuhr were severely burned and died of their injuries the following day; Tiling died in Osnabrück.

== Legacy ==
A memorial stone stands at Arenshorst, and the Reinhold-Tiling-Weg in the Sonnenhügel district of Osnabrück is named after him. In 1970 the lunar crater Tiling, on the far side of the Moon at 53°06′S 132°36′W, was named after him.

== See also ==
- Rocket mail
- Friedrich Schmiedl
- Verein für Raumschiffahrt
