= Malibu Potteries =

Ceramic tile company operating between 1926–1932

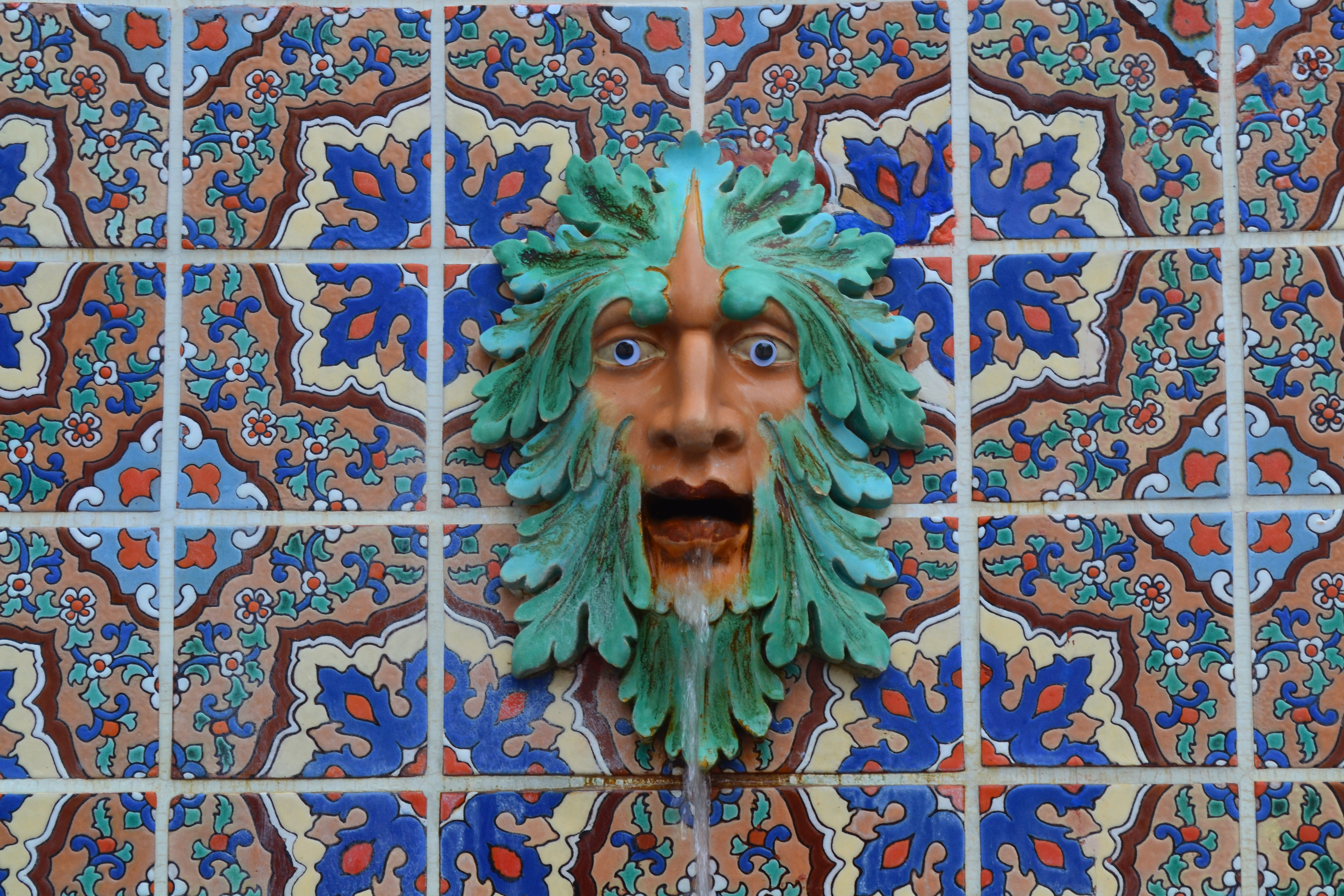
Malibu Potteries tile and fountain, Adamson House, Malibu, California

Malibu Potteries was a ceramic tile manufacturer in Malibu, California. Malibu Potteries was founded by Rhoda May Knight Rindge in 1926. A fire devastated the company 30 September 1931, and the company closed in 1932. Tile designs included influences the styles of Moorish, Egyptian, Mayan and Saracen cultures. Many of the tile designs were geometric. The company was known for their tile murals consisting of tiles with peacocks and other birds. The company also produced decorated tiles for floors in the style of a laid-out Persian rug. May Rindge's daughter's house, the historic Adamson House, has many examples of the tile produced by Malibu Potteries.

== History ==
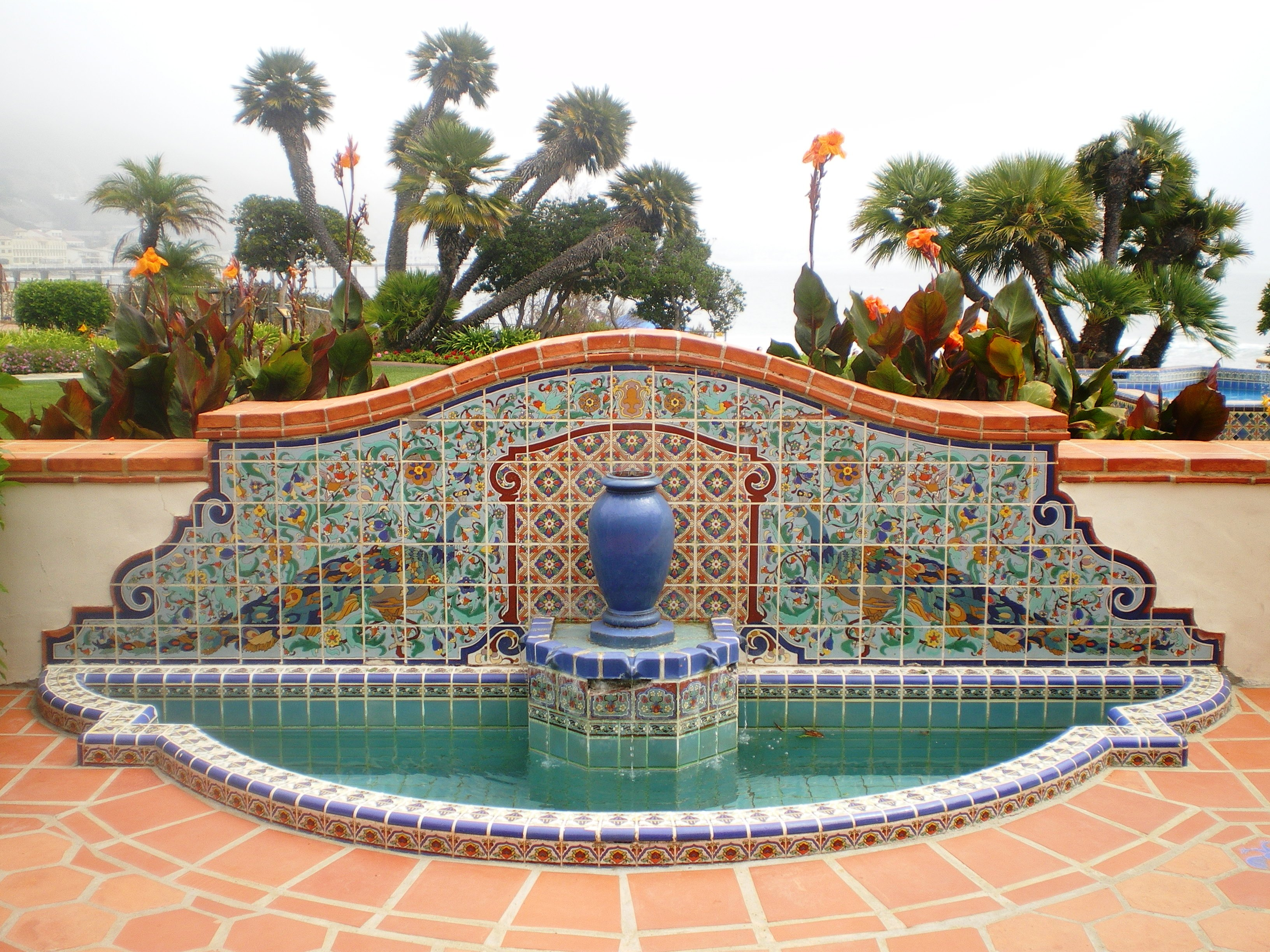
Peacock Fountain, Adamson House

Founded in 1926 by Rhoda May Knight Rindge, Malibu Potteries was formed under the corporate name Marblehead Land Company. Rindge, after unsuccessfully prospecting for oil on her property near Zuma Beach, instead found red and buff clays suitable for the production of pottery. In Malibu, California alongside the ocean coast, a factory was built to produce ceramic tile.

Rindge hired Rufus Keeler. Keeler was formerly a ceramic engineer for California Clay Products Company (Calco). Rindge and Keeler hired William Handley, a former product designer for Calco. At the height of the companies production, 125 employees produced over 30,000 square feet of tile a month.

The company specialized in the production of ceramic tile. The styles were influenced by Moorish, Egyptian, Mayan and Saracen cultures. Tile designs were mostly geometric. Tile murals were made with peacocks, ships, and birds. The company also produced fountains. Tiles were produced for the architectural, builder and design trades for use indoors and outdoors on floors, walls, fireplaces, step treads, tables, benches, and fountains.

After the stock market crash of 1929, the pottery closed for a short period of time and reopened. A devastating fire destroyed the factory on 30 September 1931. The unsold stock of tile was moved to Rindge's unfinished home near the former factory. In 1942, Rindge died and her home was sold to the Franciscan Friars. The Friars named Rindge's former home Serra Retreat. Serra Retreat was damaged in the September 1970 Malibu Canyon wild fire and was rebuilt using many of the original tiles. The wild fire had exposed a massive amount of Malibu Potteries tile stored on the property. The supply of vintage tile was unknown except to the heirs of Rindge. The vast majority of the tiles were unscathed by the fire. The excess tiles not used in the restoration of Serra Retreat were eventually sold with many being placed in private collections.

== Installations ==
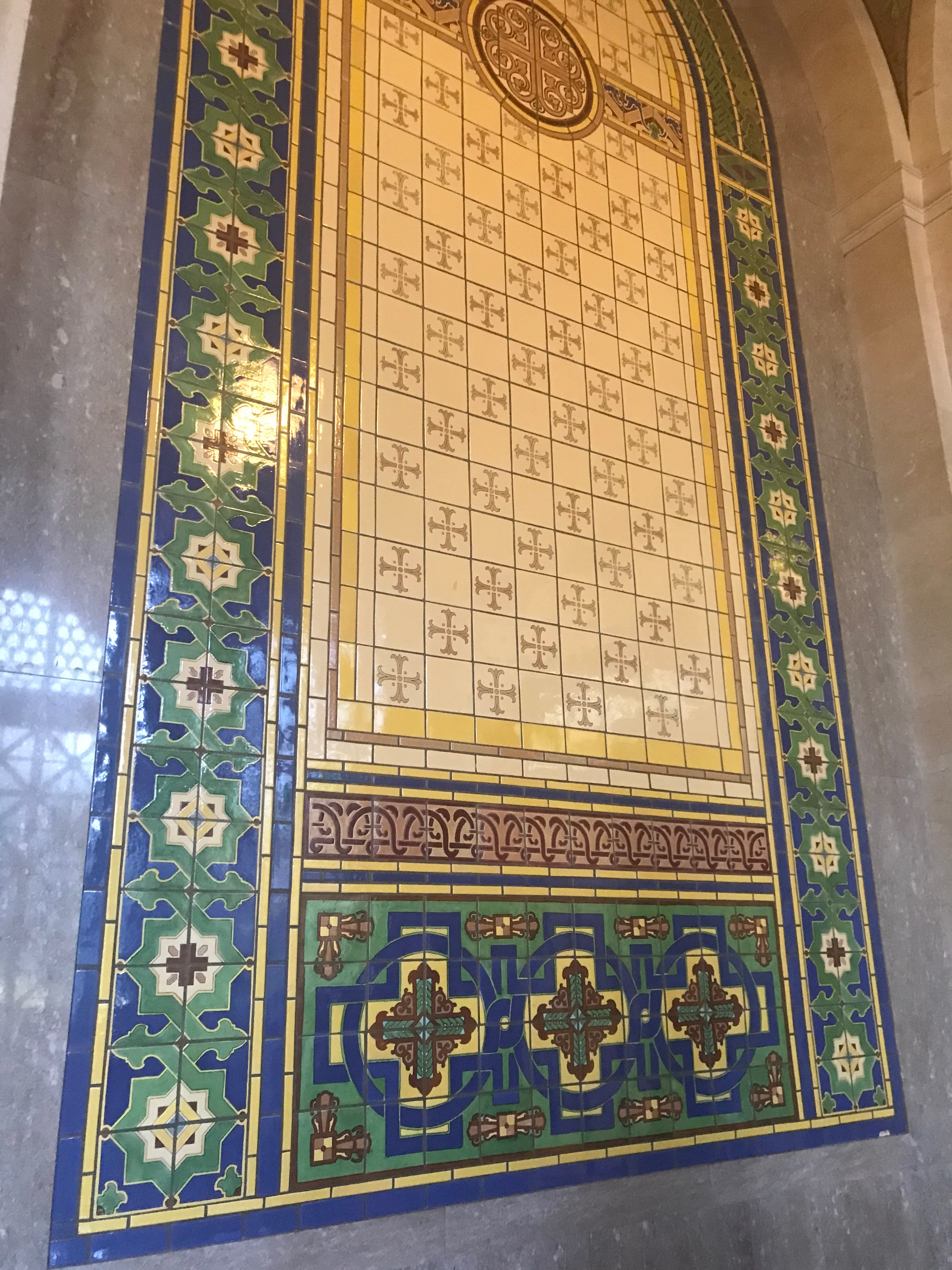
Tile work at L.A. City Hall designed by Donald Prouty of Malibu Potteries.

- Adamson House, Malibu, California
- Los Angeles City Hall
- Mayan Theater, Los Angeles
- Hollywood Roosevelt Hotel, Hollywood
- Dana Junior High School, San Pedro, California
- Union Station, Los Angeles
- Geffen Playhouse, West Los Angeles

== Revival ==
Robert (Bob) Harris, a sound technician in the movie industry purchased a large collection of Malibu Potteries tile. In 1979, Harris and ceramist Jim Sullivan founded Malibu Ceramic Works and began producing tile in the style and manner of Malibu Potteries.
