= List of villages in Katsina State =

This is a list of villages and settlements in Katsina State, Nigeria organised by local government area (LGA) and district/area (with postal codes also given).

== By postal code ==
LGA	District / area	Postal code	Villages
Bakori	Bakori	831101	Kurami; Dutsen Reme; Yankwani; Makera; Kakumi; Guga; Kandarawa; Maiyadiya; Lamido. Tsiga; Jargaba; Kabomo; Barde; Dawan Musa; Kabomo; Kwantakwaran; Amfani; Sandada; Gazara.
Batagarawa	Bata-Garawa	820102	Ajiwa; Babibayawa; Bakiyawa; Barawa; Batagarawa; Dan Iyan; Dandagoro; Danna Baso; Jino; Kaukai; Kayauki; Kayoki; Tsanni; Yan-Rakumma; Yar Gamji
Batsari	Batsari	820116	Abadau; Batsari; Dan Alhaji; Dan Geza; Darini; Gangarat-Rumah; Garwa; Hauwawa; Hurmiya; Kandawa; Karare; Kurmiyal; Kwari; Madogara; Mai Zurmi; Makada Duma; Mallamawa; Manawa; Margafi Abu; Nahuta; Rumah; Sabon Garin Dunburawa; Shirgi; Wagini; Yan Gayya; Yan-Daka; Yasore; Yau Yau
Baure	Baure	824105	Babban Mutum; Bare; Baure; Faski; Garki; Hui; Kagara; Komo; Kuntaru; Kwasamawa; Maimazari; Rijayan Tsamiya; Taramanawa; Yan Maulu; Yan-Tsai; Yankirya
Bindawa	Bindawa	822105	Rinjin-Baushe; Aisawa; Baure; Bindawa; Dallaje; daye olay; Doro; Faru; Gaiwa; Gire Mawa; Gwanza; Jibawa; Kamri; kyarmanya; Mazanya; Rugan Barde; Shibdawa; Tama; Tuwaru; Yangora, tudun wada, Fura Girke
Charanchi	Charanchi	822104	Banye; Charanchi; Dafara; Doka; Ganuwa; Kadanya; Koda; Kumuye; Kuraje; Maje; Radda; Safana; Tsakatsa; Tsaski; Yaruku
Dan Musa	Danmusa	821104	Dan Ali; Dandire; Danmusa; Maidabino; Mara; Mara-Zamfarawa; Tsahar Mai-Alewa.; Yan-Tumaki-Galadima; Yantunmaki
Dandume	Dandume	830103	Dan Soda; Dandume; Dantakari; Ilalla; Jiruwa; Magaji-Wando; Mahuta; Mai Kwama; Nasarawa; Tumbarkai; Unguwar Gamba; Unguwar Malamja
Danja	Danja	831102	Dabai; Tsangamawa; Jiba; Kahutu; Tandama; Yakaji; Majedo; Bazaga; Chediya; Dauraku; Danmaigauta.
Daura	Daura	824101	Bauni; Bojo; Daberam; Don-Nakola Garjiya; Dunu; Ganga; Gurjiya; Iambu-Tudu; Jambu; Kalgo; Kamfawa; Kurneji; Madobi; Maji Yawa; Mazoji; S/Yara; Sabon Gari; Sarkin Yara; Shadambu; Shamarada; Sharawa; Suduji; Sukwanawa; Turimni; Ubandawaki; Unguwa Dawaki; Yamadawa; Yarogel; Zari
Dutsi	Dutsi	823103	Baugel; Be'al; Beguwa; Dan Rumai; Dan-Kowa; Danaunai; Dinya mai; Dinya mai Randa; Dutsawa; Dutsi; Gazari; Gewayau; Ginginya; Jigawa-Tirke; Kaba; Kafin Labu; Kagon-Burtu; Karawa; Karemi; Kayawa; Kegiya; Macinawa; Madawa; Makan Gara; Makangara; Minawa; R//Kaya; Shargalle; Sirika; Tashar-Wali; Yamel
Dutsin-Ma	Dutsin-Ma	821101	Bagagadi; Dabawa; Dagelawai; Dan Ali; Dorawa; Dutsi-Ma; Kagara; Karofi; Katanga; Kufan Aggo; Kuki; Kutawa; Kutawa-Badole; Mahuta-Sabon Garin -Safana; Makera; Nasarawa - Gizawa; Rayi-Faguwa; Sabon Garin Turare; Salihawa; Sawawa-Dogon Ruwa; Shema; Shema-Hayin Gada; Tashar Bara'u; Yan Shantuna
Faskari	Faskari	830102	Bagudu; Bakarya; Bele; Bilbis; Birnin Kogo; D/Ba'u; Daudawa; Doma; Fankama; Faskari; Kadisau; Kanon Haki; Karmanje U/Bikka; Kogo; Kondo; Kwabirshawa; Kwai; Kwakware Sheme; Ladan; Mai Gora; Mairuwa; Maisabo; Monunu; Munhaye; Ruwan Godiya; S/Layin Galadima; Sarkin Fulani; Shawu; Sheme; Tafoki; Tudun Laki; Ung-Bara'u; Ung-Diyam; Ung-Doka; Ung-Ganye; Ung-Gwanki; Ung-Maikanwa; Ung-Maje; Ung-Malam Musa; Ung-Miko; Ung-Namande; Ung-Sakkai; Ung-Wakili; Wakataba; Yan Kara; Yan Turawa; Yankara; Yar Malami; Yar Marafa; Yar Nassarawa
Funtua	Funtua (Rural)	830101	Dukke; F/Dadutsi; F/Maikatawa; F/Ta Gabas; F/Ta Yamma; F/Tanimu; F/Tudu; F/Wawa; Farin; Goya; Illala; Jabiri; Maigamji; Mairuwa; Makera; Maska; Ruwan Godiya; Tundun Wada; Tundun-iya; Zamfarawa
Ingawa	Ingawa	823104	Agayawa; Bakinkwari; Bareruwa; Bidore; Dan Ashintan; Dara; Daunaka; Dugul; Gamda; Ingawa; Jobe-Kandawa; Kafi; Karkarku; Koda; Kurfeji; Maje; Maramwa; Nasarawa; Rimin Hagau; Ruruma; Tunas; Yalasse; Yallawa; Yan Kaura; Yandoma; Yaya
Jibiya	Daddara	820105	Bugaje; Kusa; Zandam
Jibiya	Jibiya	820104	Bugaje; Farfaru; Gangara; Gulbin Baure; Jibiya; Kusa; Magama; Maje; Mallamawa; Mazanya; Riko; Simfida; Tagwaye; Tsanga; Yan Gayya; Yangau
Kafur	Kafur	832103	Barakai; Dakin-Kura; Dan Kanjiba; Dan Kwaro; Dantige; Dantutture; Dayawa; Dutse; Dutsin-Yanke; Gamzako; Gozaki; Huguma; Kafur; Kagara; Kami; Kanya; Kartakai; Kufan Tambo; Kuraku; Kurin Gafa; Kurmi; Layin-Bagudu; Layin-Makera; Mahuta; Malamawa; Marabar-Kanya; Masari; Masu-Kinari; Rafin-Kada; Rigaji; Sabuwar-Kasa; Santar Arab; Tafkin-Jage; Tudun-Sanusi; Unguwar Waina; Unguwar-Sama'I; Yar-Talata; Yari-Bori; Yarman
Kaita	Kaita	820103	Abdallawa; Allemi; Ba Awa; Bado; Dagon Dawa; Damgamji; Dan Bazau; Dan Kama; Dan Kunama; Dan Tudu; Dankaba; Dankunama; Daurawa; Dumbasa; Dutsin-Safe; Gafiya; Gande; Girka; Gishirawa; Jifatu; Kabobi; Kafin-Mashi; Kagadama; Kaita; Lafiyaru; Lalaini; Maikasuwa; Makau; Masaki; Matsai; Rogon-Dawa; Sabi; Sabon Birni; Sawarya; Tsamiye; Unguwa Isamiya; Yan Daki; Yan doki; Yan Hoho
Kankara	Kankara	832102	Almajiraiwa; Arewa; Bagoma; Burdugu; Da-Kumeji; Dan Dashire; Dan Maidoki; Dan Marabu; Dan Marke; Dan-Kalgo; Dan-Nakinaba; Dan-Sabau; Dorowar-Natiba; Fawwa; Garaji(A); Garaji(B); Gatakawa; Gobi rawa; Goda; Gundawa; Gurbi; Harwaya; Hurya; Jan-Ruwa; Kada-Buki; Kafi; Kanawa; Kankara; Kankomi; Katoge; Katsalle; Ketare; Kukarsheka; Labi; Madobi; Makera; Malali; Mashigi; Sabon Gari; Sabon Layi; Santar Dangeda; Sherere; Unguwar Alh. Garba; Unguwar-Marke; Wawakaza; Yargoje; Yarwa; Zabaro; Zakaru; Zango
Kankia	Kankiya	822101	Dan Doro; Daya; Duku-Duku; Fakuwa; Galadima; Gidan Mutum; Gochi; Gyaza; Jauga; Kafinsoli; Kankiya; Kanyen Maina; Kuduru; Machinjin; Magajin Gari; Magami; Nasarawa; Nasarawa Rimaye; Rimaye; Sagawar Doka; Sukuntuni; Tafajomua; Tafashiya; Tsa; Tudun-Wulli
Katsina	Katsina (Rural)	820101	Ajiwa; Baki Yawa; Dndagora; Dustin Safe; Galadiman Arewa; Galadiman Gabasawa; Galadiman Kudu; Gwado; Jino; Katsina; Kayauki; Madaji Madu; Modoji; Shinkafi; Wakilin Arewa; Wakilin Gabasa; Wakilin Kudu; Wakilin Tamma
Kurfi	Kurfi	821103	Barkiya; Birchi; Gwanzo; Kufan Agga; Kurfi; Kware; Nasarrawa; Rawayau; Sabon Gari; Tamawa; Tamu; Tsauri; Wurma
Kusada	Kusada	822102	Aganta; Baurawa; Boko; Dangamau; Dudunni; Kai-Kai; Kofa; Kusada; Magama-Gidan Mutun Daya; Mairana; Mawashi; Tufani; Yashe
Mai-Adua	Mai-Adua	824102	Baida; Buduma; Bula; Bumbum; Daba; Dadin Sarki; Dagon Hawa; Dagura; Dan Nasara; Dan Yawa; Danmisa; Dansawa; Dunyashe; Galadimawa; Garon Maje; Gojo-Gogo; Guzu; Gwajo-Gwajo; Jassai; Jirdede; Ka Dangwaras; Kahe; Kalansanmi; Katsinawa; Kokutuko; Kongolam; Koza; Kudi Jika; Kurchi; Kwadage; Madaddaga; Mai Daniya; Mai Faru; Mai Gari; Mai Kwamame; Mai-Adua; Maikoni; Maiturmi; Makerawa; Muludu; Natsalle; Saitawa; Shabewa; Sharta; Shekiya; Shiroka; Tadi; Tafakai; Tilla; Tsabu; Tsauri; Tsiga-Hamisu; Tsohou Birni; Tuga; Unguwar Jimmai; Unguwar Tuka; Wala; Yan Harkum; Yan Kara; Yar Yandi; Yarima Jatau; Yarogel
Malumfashi	Malumfashi	832101	Agagiwa; Allah Madagara; Almakiyayi; Birin Dawa; Dan-Sarai; Dayi; Dinyar Makeri; Dogon Marke; Fanisau; Gamzaga; Gandum Karfi; Gangara; Gora; Gorar-Dansaka; Gwanamarde; Karfi; Kuringaja; Kurmin Gafa; Kurmin Yan Daddawa; Lamintani; Layin Ministra; M/Kankara; Makaurachi; Malumfashi A; Malumfashi B; Marmara; Na-Alama; Na-alma; Rereji; Ruwan Sanyi; Sabon Gari; Salihawa; Tashar Ali; Tashar Fulani; Wanzamai; Ya-Kwakare; Yaba; Yan Mama; Yan-Janku; Yan-Mama; Yar Tashi; Yaro; Zamzago
Mani	Mani	823101	Aliyaba; Bagiwa; Bakan Karo; Birjiwa; Bujawa; Dawan-Makawu; Duwan; Gajema; Gewayau; Hancheta; Jachi; Jani; Jirja; kijibta; Kugabo; Kumumuwa; Kwatya; Machika; Magani; Makau; Mani; Muduru; Saguwa; Sardago; Shakura; Takusheyi; Tsagem; Tsaurara; Turawa
Mashi	Mashi	823102	Agalla; Badauri; Bamle; Birnin Kuka; Dindiyel; Doguru; Dokawa; Gallu; Jigawa; Karawa; Korau; Majigiri; Mashi; Morawa; S/Rijiya; Saye; Shargalle; Sonkaya; Tamilo; Tudu; Yamal; Yar Daddo
Matazu	Matazu	833102	Dan-Kwari; Dissi; Gidan-Dangata; Gidan-Karo; Gwarjo; Gyazawa; Jataka; Jumawa; Karaduwa; Karmatako; Kogari; Matazu; Mazoji; Rinjin-Gora; Rinjin-Idi; Sabon Garin Matazu; Sayaya; Tashar Gurgu
Musawa	Musawa	833101	Aljawa; Daminawa; Dan Gani; Dan Janku; Dan Kado; Farin-Dutse; Filalawa; Garu; Gidan-Lumo; Gin-Gin; Jikamshi; Karachi; Katoge; Kauyen-Gide; Kira; Kiryoyi; Kurkujan; Kuru; Marabar-Musawa; Musawa; Rijar-Kusa; Sako; Sanyinawa; Tabanni; Tuge; Unguwar-Rinji; Yarradua; Zodawa
Rimi	Rimi	822103	Abukar; Allaraini; Bardayya; Bujawa; Dan Musa; Eka; Fardami; Iyatawa; Iyatawu; Kadandani; Karare; Kurabau; Kuraye; Lambar Rimi; Madunka; Magama; Majen-Gobir; Makurda; Makwalla; Masabo; Remawa; Rimi; Rimin Guza; Sabob Gari; Siyya; Tzegero
Sabuwa	Sabuwa	830104	Albasa; Awala; Damari; Doka; Dudun Ma'azu; Gamji; Gazari; Ginanna; Gobirawa; Hayin Issau; Inonon Kabalawa (B); Inonon Madawaki (A); Inonon Makera (C); Inonon Malamai (D); Kabalawa; Katsalle; Machika; Mai Bakko; Mazare; Nassarawa Daji; Rafin Iwa; Rumada; Sabuwa; Sarkin Dawa; Sayau; Un-Habibu; Ung madugu; Ung-Abdu; Ung-Adamu; Ung-Alh Tanimu Gagarkuwa; Ung-Bako Banga; Ung-Dabo; Ung-Donkinari; Ung-Garba; Ung-Halidu; Ung-Hamza; Ung-Iliya; Ung-Kadarko; Ung-Kanawa; Ung-Maigaiya; Ung-Maiwasa; Ung-Sani; Unn-Kanta; Ya Lagwada; Yar Kaka; Zaje-Zaji
Safana	Safana	821103	B/Dahu; Bare-Bari; Baude; Baure; Dabbana Duhu; Dan-Jukku; Dan-Magaya; Gora; Guzarawa; Illela; Kunamawa; Maikada; Mammadau; Moniya; Runka; Safana; Tsakiya; Unadau; Yarlilo; Zakka
Sandamu	Sandamu	824103	Dadin-Kowa; Damagi; Danji; Duku-Duku; Fago; Gazori; Ingawa; Jar-Kuka; Jiba; Kaibaki; Karkarku; Katsayal; Kwasarawa; Lemo; Lugga; Markarku; Rade; Rijiyar Tsamiya; Ruma; Ruwau-Dutsi; Sandamu; Yakawada; Yan-Manuwa; Zugai
Zango	Zango	824104	Agala; Arautake; Badake; Barege; Bidawa; Bulungudu; Dan Ali; Dargage; Dasha; Dawan-Malam; Ditse; Fantaika; Fiwuni; Fiyuni; Garandama; Garni; Gurda; Gwamba; Gwanba; Huli; Ishiyawa; Jiba; Jirdede; Kanda; Katsayai; Kawarin Malamai; Komo; Kututture; Kwarin-Kudi; Kwarin-Malamai; Madaka; Maibara; Makiyawa; Ragogo-Cidari; Rahamawa; Rijiyar Mata; Rogogo; Rogogo Masabka; Rogogo Yan Tuba (Jama'a); Rogogon Gabsa; Sara; Unguwar Dima; Unguwar Gaje; Unguwar Kanja; Walawa; Yakubawa; Yanduna; Yar Daje; Yardade; Zagon Kofar Gabas; Zango; Zangon Customs Barracks; Zangon Kachakurawa; Zangon Kofar Yamma; Zangon Kofar Arewa; Zangon Kofar Kudu; Zangon-Katukulo

== By electoral ward ==
Below is a list of polling units, including villages and schools, organised by electoral ward.

LGA	Ward	Polling unit name
Bakori	Bakori A	Bakori Gari 1 - Nadabo Pri. Sch.; Bakori Gari II -Nadabo Pri. Sch.; Bakori III - K/G Talban Bakori; Bakori Gari IV - Masallacin Izala; Ung Tofa I - K/G Sarkin Fawa; Ung Tofa II K/G. Malam Bala; Ung Tofa III - K/G Mai Fulani; Ung Tofa IV - Old Market; Buri Nadabo - K/G. Mal. Yahuza; Rafin Sarkin Zango I - Dutsen Zanzarya; Rafin Sarkin Zango II K/G Alh. Lawal Rumawa; Tashar Guga 1 - L. E. A T/Guga; Tashar Guga II L. E. A. T/Guga; Tashar Guga III Marabar Danja K/G Makama
Bakori	Bakori B	Zage-Zagi -Pri. Sch. Zage-Zagi; Zage-Zagi - Vetinery; Bakori Gari 1 - Dispensary; Bakori Gari II - Near District H. Office; Bakori Gari III - Ramalan Pri Sch.; Bakori Gari III - F. S. A. Clinic; Ung. Yaro - K/G Mai Ung.; Yanlambu Dandali; Adako - K/G Mai Ung; Ung. Sanyi I - K/G Mai Ung; Ung Sanyi II - Opposite Motor Park; Abarshi - Abarshi; Danfulani - Danfulani K/G Mai. Ung; Ung. Sambo I - K/G Mai Ung; Ung. Sambo II - K/G Mai Ung And Yara Area
Bakori	Kurami/Yankwani	Kurami - Pri Sch.; Kurami Gari - T. V. Centre; Nabukka 1- Pri Sch.; Nabukka II - K/G Mai Ung; Kafi Awo - K/G Mai Ung; Mashanya - K/G Alh. Aminu; Doka - K/G Mai Ung; Tarzana - K/G Mai Ung; Sajo I K/G Mai Ung.; Sajo II Pri School; Sajo III - K/G Alh. Ali; Sajo IV - K/G Mai Ung; Tsigi - K/Gmai Ung; Ung. Ladan - K/G Mai Ung; Rafin Kanya/Ung Naino - K/G Mai Ung; Rinji - K/G Mai Ung; Yankwani Gari I - K/G Mai Gari; Yankwani Gari II Pri. Sch; Yankwani Yamma - K/G Mai Ung; Layin Rama - K/G Mai Ung; Ganjar Dangoggo - K/G Mai Ung; Karma Ba, Ajo - K/G Mai Ung; Danbaure/Ung Kurami - Pri School; Makera Fulani - K/G Mai Ung; Mijin Yawa Dandi - K/G Mai Ung; Gidan Yau Na Tura - K/G Mai Ung; Yankwani Mumini - Pri Sch.; Sarkin Fulani Baka - K/G Mai Ung; Belen Gada - Pri School
Bakori	Dawan Musa	Dawan Musa Gari - Mai Kwari Pri. Sch.; Rafin Gora I - K/G Mai Ung; Kadan Yar Baushe - K/G Mai Ung.; Danbatta - Tamarke; Ung Yari Basko - K/G Yari Baso; Ung Waziri - Kanawa Pri. Sch.; Gwamutsawa - K/G Mai Ung; Ung Baure - Ung Baure; Gidan Nakuluwa - K/G Mai Ung.; Ung Waziri - K/G Mai Ung; Rafin Gora II - Ung Gabas; Ung Shudi - Gidan Shudi; Rafin Gora III - Community Centre
Bakori	Tsiga	Tsiga Gubas K/G. Litin Waziri; Tsiga Yamma - Pri. Sch.; Tsiga Kudu - K/G Alh. Ummaru; Tsiga Tsakiya K/G Mal. Yunusa; Maitakobi - Pri Sch.; Kwanar Agwagwa - K/G Agwagwa; Ung Mazadu - K/G Mal. Inusa; Wardanga - Pri School; Babban Kufai - Pri. School; Uji A - K/G Mai Ung; Makurdi Hanya I - K/G Mai Ung; Zage-Zagi - Pri School; Yargauta - Pri School; Makurdi Fulani Nomadic Pri. School; Makrudi Hanya II Main Road
Bakori	Kabomo	Kabomo Gari I - Pri. School; Kofar Fada - T. V. Centre; Ung. Mai Gyada K/G Mai Ung; Layin Kuka - Pri School; Ung Madawaki - K/G Mai Ung; Gazara - Pri School; Gazara Ganjar - Gindin Cediya; Ung Sa, Adu I Pri. School; Ung. Saadu II, - Gindin Mangwaro; Kabomo Gari II - Sararin Layi; Ung Mai Gyada II - Danfili; Kuka - Ung Kuka; Kofar Fada II - Bakin Fada
Bakori	Barde/Kwantakwaran	Barde - Barde Pri. School; Layin Mahauta - K/G Alh. Nuhu; Rafin Karo - Gidin Cediya; Ung Makau - Gidin Runfa; Zangon Marke - K/G Mai Ung; Gidan Madugu - K/G Mai Ung; Gidan Maikafi - Dispensary; Ung Yamma 1 T. V. Centre; Ung Yamma II K/G Mai Gari; Ung Kawo - K/G Mai Ung; Gidan Dodo - K/G Mai Ung; Ung Jalatu - K/G Mai Ung; Gobirawa - Near Mosque; Ung Tanga - K/G Mai Ung; Ung Kwanki - Bakin Kantin Alh. Riga; Gidan Bakori - Near Islamiya Pri. School; Ung Amfani - Kantin Mal. Yahaya; Ung Dambiri - K/G Mai Ung; Tudun Wada - Yar Yara Under Tree
Bakori	Jargaba	Jargaba Arewa - K/G Lawal Na Lako; Jargaba Tsakiya K/G Mal. Mati; Dangana Gari - K/G Mai Ung; Shuwaki I Pri. Sch.; Shuwaki II Pri. Sch.; Dangana Kawari - K/G Dahiru; Ung Noma - K/G Alh. Garba; Ung Dogo 1 - K/G Mai Ung; Makurdi I K/G Alh. Sule; Jargaba Kudu K/G Ali Dutsi; Makurdi II - K/G Mai Ung; Ung Dogo II - K/G Mai Gari
Bakori	Kakumi	Na Alhaji - K/G Mai Ung; Koshe 1-K/G Mai Ung; Koshe II - K/G Mai Ung; Mukaddas I K/G Mai Ung; Mukaddas II - K/G Mai Ung; Makera - K/G Mai Ung; Zamfarawa - K/G Mai Ung.; Kofar Fada - T. V. Centre; Ung. Liman Rayya I - K/G Mai Ung; Ung. Liman Rayya II- Mai Ung; Na Sambo - K/G Mai Ung; Dunhui - Pri School.; Makaranta Pri School; Danwaila - K/G Mai Ung; Dandaudu K/G Mai Ung; Danguza Pri School; Danwaila/Na Sambo - Pri School,
Bakori	Guga	Guga Gari I - Model Pri. School; Guga Gari II - Guga Dispensary; Guga Gari III - K/G Sarin Fawa; Hado I Mai Goje Pri School; Hado II - K/G Mai Baka; Galadima K/G Dankwari; Runji - K/G Mai Ung; Ung Taura - K/G Sambo Kailo; Ung Ummaru - K/G Bello Danbarau; Magoje - K/G Alh. Adamu Baiye; Danjaba I - K/G Mai Ung. Na Doma; Danjaba II - K/G Alh. Aiyo Yanshuni; Danjaba III - Danjaba Junction
Bakori	Kandarawa	Kandarawa - Pri School; Maiyadiya I K/G Mai Gari; Maiyadiya II K/G Mai Gari; Maiyadiya III - Yar Yara; Ung Ummaru I K/G Wakilin Maigari; Ung Ummaru II - Pri School; Ung Ummaru III Pri. School; Danjagale - K/G Mai Gari; Alabira - K/G Mai Ung; Ung Tanko / Pry. Sch/; Balbelu - K/G Mai Ung.; Kandarawa II K/G Mai Gari.
Batagarawa	Batagarawa A	Dugazawa/Alkalawa Ung. Rinji O. S; Yandadi Yandadi O. S; Baganzamawa - Baganzamawa O. S; Kawo - Kawo O. S; Boragundura B-Boragundura; Bora Gunddara B/Gundara O. S; Autawa Gari O. S; Bussau - Bussau Pri School; Batagarawa Pri. School; Dugazawa - Dugazawa O. S; Bat. Low Coast - Pri School; Bat Diispensary - Dispensary; Bat F. C. E - Fed Col. Ed.; Poly - Poly; Marna Zannabu - Marna Zannabu; Fage - Fage O. S; Uwanta Dagora Kwanta Dgos; Batagarawa Low Coast Pri. School.; Batagarawa Town Dispensary; Fed. Col. Of Ed - Fecoled
Batagarawa	Batagarawa B	Gwamma Tawa Gari; Makada; Dabaibayawa Pri School; Bado North Pri. School; Jilawar Ango Pri. Sch.; Jilawar Farun Yahaya; Kamfatau - Kamfatau O. S; Dabaibayawa Gabas - D/Gabas O. S; Makada - Makada O. S; Dabaibayawa South - Kg. Kaiuvguwa; Kauyen Yamma -K/Yamma O. S
Batagarawa	Dandagoro	Inwala - Inwala; Makurdi - Pri School; Tigirmis - Tigirmis; Tsuntsuwa - Tsuntsuwa; Dandagoro C. Gari - Behind Jumaat Mosq.; Yan Naira - Pri School; Kaukai - Kaukai; Morawa - Morawa; Kabakawa S. Gari - Kabakawa; Kaffi - Behind Dandagoro Mosq.; Turawa - Model P. School; Makaurachi - Maukarachi; Doka; Kabukawa - Kabukawa; Katarda - Katarda; Yar Haka - Yar Haka; Rugar Dila Rugar Dila; Dandagoro S/G Dandagoro
Batagarawa	Ajiwa	Barhin Shaiskawa - Barhin Shaiskawa; Barhin Tudu - Barhin Tudu; Barhin B/Gida - Barhin B. Gida; Barhin Masakas- Barhin Masaka; Bani Iza - Behind M/Unguwa; Makera - Gidan Taki; Majen Audu - Maje; Majen Audu Gari Maje Gari; Ajiwa U/Bature U/Bature; Ung Garbas- Ung Garbas; Yar Rakumma - Yar Rakumma; Sabon Garin - Naira - Sabon Garin-Naira; Ajiwa Kurtufa - Ajiwa Kurtufa; Shagumba - Shagumba; Ajiwa Shagumba - Cikin Gari; Kurtufa - G/Mai Unguwa; Shairi - Shairi; Shantali- Shantali; Ajiwa Gari - Ajiwa Gari; Ajiwa Shantau - Ung Liman; Bani Iza Gari - B/Iza Gari; Makera / Ung. / Lingu Makera; Shagumba - Shagumba O. S; Ajiwa - Ajiwa Gari O. S.
Batagarawa	Tsanni	Kofar Fada - Kofar Fada; Tsanni North Tsanni North; Mai Lalle - Mai Lalle; Makantanawa - Makantawa; Alale - Alale; Rahaje - Rahaje; Kundu Waje - Kundu Waje; Yarbarza - Yarbarza; Tsanni- Tsanni; Rugoji - Rugoji
Batagarawa	Jino	Jino Magumi - Jino Gari; Jino - Jino O. S; Sabon Garin Yahuza S/G/Yahuza; Yar Shanya Yar Shanya; Inwala - Inwala O. S; Banbami - Banbami O. S.; Babbar Ruga - B/Ruga O. S; Jangefe-Jnagefe; Kewa - Kewa O. S; Gangara - Gangara; Marmara - Marmara; Kewa Dan Aisha Kewa D/Aisha; Jan Gefe - Jangefi
Batagarawa	Barawa	Barawa North - Barawa N.; Shibdawa - Dispensary; Barawa Gari - Kgmai Ung; Gyarwe - Salihawa P. S; Zori - Zori Gari; Yargigo - Kg Mai Ung; Ung/M-Goje - Ung M. Goje; Barawa Salihawa - Barawa Salihawa; Barawa East - Barawa E.; Yar Rimaye - Yar Rimaye
Batagarawa	Bakiyawa	Intotsa - Tashar Bkluyawa; Bakiyawa Gari - Bak. Pri School; Kwaina - Kwaina; Bakiyawa A - Bakiyawa O. S; Bakiyawa -Bakiyawa; Lallaba - Lallaba O. S; Majen Dole; Yangemu - Yan-Gemu; Kore - Kore; Kwarin Mai Kotso - Kwari M. W; Kainawa - Kainawa; S. G. Lallaluba - Sg; S. G. Bakiyawa O. S.
Batagarawa	Kayauki	Kayauki A - Kayauki Pri-School; Kayauki B; Dan, Iyau - Dan, Iyau; Ung. Saryin Gyada - Ung. Sarkin. Gyada; Yabani - Yabani; Kadafawa - Kadafawa; Abarshi - Kayauki Abarshi; S. Kwalbati - Kwalbati; Kunhundu - -Kurhundu; Yar Shanya - Yar Sanya; Kutubi - Kutubi; Bardar Kusada - Bardar Kusuda; Bardar Murtala - Bardar Murtala; Musawa - Musawa; Katoge - Katoge
Batagarawa	Yargamji	Almun Jamaa - Almun Jama'a; Zagando A Zangando 'A'; Yar Gamji -Yargamji; Kufantarno - Kufan Tarno; Tarno - Pri Sch.; Tabkin Almu - Pri Sch.; Sabaru - Sabaru; Yan Butu - Yan Butu O. S; Zangando A. Zangando 'B'
Batsari	Batsari	Ung Sarki/TV Centre; Ung A. Lawal/Model Pri Sch.; Ung Gwanda/K/G/ Mai Ung.; Ung Magaji/K/G Magaji; Leko/K/G Mai Ung; Ung Malamai/K. G Mai Ung; Ung Soli/K. G Mai Ung; Ung A. Jibo/K. G. Alh. Ajibo; Sali Hawar Dakauna/K. M. Ung; Tudun Modi. / Pri Sch.; Watan Gadiya/Pri Sch.; Yasore/Pri Sch.; Biya - Ki - Kwana/K. G Mai Ung; Katsalle/K. G Mai Ung; Garin Dutse/Pri. Sch.; Ung Alkali/Gdss Batsari; Ung Hardo/K. G. Mai Ung; Kwarin Faggo/K/G Mai Ung; Tsohuwar Tasha/K. G. A. Bawale; Kwalbati Babba/Kwalbati; Day Sec/G. D. S. S.; Karamar Asibiti/Dispensary; Garin Dutse / Open Space
Batsari	Manawa	Gobirawa/K. G Mai Unguwa; Kabobin Anaruwa K/G Mai Ungwa; Tsugunni/K. G Maiunguwa; Duba/K. G. Maiunguwa; Ung Liman Duba/Kg Liman; Garin Waziri/Kg Mai Unguwa; Dangeza/TV. Centre; Duba. Ung Liman/Kg. Liman; Batsarin Alhaji/Kg. Mai Ungwa; Tashar Modibbo/Kg Mai Ungwa; Kofa/Primary School; Hushin Buku/K. G Mai Unguwa; Manawa Primary School; Shadagora/Kg. Mai Unguwa; Dangeza II / T. V. Centre
Batsari	Wagini	Wagini North/K. G M/Ung; Wagini South/T. V. Centre; Wagini East/Pri. Sch.; Wagini West/K/G M. Ung; Ung. Mati/K/G M. Ung; Garin Hambama/K. G. M. Ung; Tulluwa/K. G. Mai Gari; Daurawa/Pr. Sch.; Garin Ajiya/Yara; Kasai West/P. S; Kasai/East/K/G Mai Ung; Dantudu/Pr. Sch.; Garin Dodo/Pr School; Dan-Iya/.K. G M/Ung; Ung. Maiwake/Dispensary; Giginyu/K/G Mai Ung
Batsari	Abadau/Kagara	Jataka/Kg. Maiunguwa; Abadau/Primary School; Shirgi South/TV Centre; Shirgi North/Primary School; Dadin Kowa/Primary School; Tadeta/Primary School; Tudun Wada Tadeta/K. G Maiunguwa; Jambali/K. G. Mai Ungwa; Tsabawa/K. G. Mai Unguwa; Akata/Dispenary; Danbarau/Kg Mai Ungwa; Baran Kada/Pri School; Zamfarawa/TV Centre; Zanko/Kg. Mai Ungwa; Ung Guga/Kg. Mai Unguwa; Sawanawa/Kg. Mai Ungwa; Tunya/Kg. Mai Unguwa; Giyaye/Kg. Mai Unguwa; Sabon Birni/Kg Mai Unguwa
Batsari	Yauyau/Mallamawa	Mallamawa-Dispensary; Dantudu - K/G Maiung; Bukuru -K/G Maiung; Kofa - Kg/ Maiung; Garwa Primary School; Tsauyau - Pri Sch.; Bawa Fulani - K/G Maiung; Ung. Koshe - K/G Maiung; Kaballe - K/G Maiung; Gangara - Pri Sch; Uda - K/G. Maiung; Gasakoli - K/G Maiung
Batsari	Kandawa	Kandawa South - Yara; Kandawa North - Ung Na Buhari; Ung. Danbaba - K/G. Mai Ung; Ung. Ta Annabi / K/G Ta Annabi; Kandawa Makera -K/G. Alh. Jumo; Gandu - K/G. Alh. Kasimu; Dankar North - Babbar Yara; Dankar South - K/G Mai Ung; Ruwan Giginya - K/G Mai Ung; Tsauwa - K/G Mai Ung; Babban Giba - Kg. Mai Ung; Hirdashi - K/G Mai Ung
Batsari	Dan. Alh/Yangaiya	Yandaka/T. V Centre; Nasarawa/K/G M/Ung; Tashar Goriba/K/G. Mai Ung; Gajen Haro/Pri Sch.; Gefe/Pri. Schl; Saki Jiki/Pri Sch.; Dan Alhaji/Pri Sch.; Tashar Kadanya/T. V Centre; Mai Doriya/Pri Sch.; Salihawa /K/G. M/Ung; Yan Gaiya/K/G M/Ung; Kurmiyal / T. V Centre; Makada Duma/K/G M/Ung; Ruwan Faru/Pr. Sch.; Kukar Tor/Pri Sch.; Maiwa/Pri Sch.; Garin Goje/Pri Sch.; Kadeji/Pri Sch.; Kagadama/K/G M/Ung; Tsamiya/K/G M/Ung
Batsari	Ruma	Ruma Sabuwa/Pri Sch.; Ruma Tsohuwa/K/G. M/Ung; Hura Girke/K/G. M/Ung; Rayin Habe/Pri Sch.; Rayin Fulani/K/G. M/Ung; Jiba/Pri. Sch.; Yar Larba/Pri. Sch.; Garin Labo/K/G M/Ung; Sabon Gari Dumbu Rawa/Pri Sch.; Shingi/K/G. M/Ung; Garin Barkono/K/G. M/Ung; Ung A. Dano/K/G M/Ung; Dan Kwandatso/K/G. M/Ung; Sabon Garin Dumburawa II / Primary School
Batsari	Darini/Magaji/Abu	Magaji Abu/Primary School; Ungududdai/K/G Mai Unguwa; Karewa/K/G Mai Unguwa; Kincuri/K/G Mai Unguwa; Garin Inu/K/G Mai Unguwa; Darini/K/G/Mai Unguwa; Makururuta West/K/G Mai Unguwa; Yargamji/K/G Mai Unguwa; Shekewa/Dispensary; Garin Buda/K/G Mai Unguwa; Saika/K/G Mai Unguwa; Nashe/K/G Mai Unguwa; Tsolan/K/G Mai Unguwa; Tashar Kwantagi K/G Mai Ung.
Batsari	Karare	Karare West/T. V Center; Karare East/Dispensary; Kwatarni/Primary School; Gano/K/G Mai Unguwa; Dangaru/Pri Sch; Barebari/K/G Mai Unguwa; Madaddaban Garba/K/G Mai Unguwa; Kokiya/K/G Mai Unguwa; Tsagengeni/Primary School; Maikaren Sharu/Pri. School; Mai Katanga/K/G Mai Unguwa; Torawa/K/G Mai Unguwa; Dullu/K/G Mai Unguwa; Madaddabai/K/G Mai Unguwa; Gazari/K/G Ami Unguwa
Batsari	Madogara	Madogara/T. V Centre; Ajasu/Primary School; Nahuta/Primary School; Dantsuntsu/TV Centre; Maisayaki/K. G Mai Unguwa; Garin Gwani/K. G Mai Unguwa; Garin Zaki/Primary School; Bakon Zabo/K. G. Mai Unguwa; Madaddabai/Primary School; Salihawar Mamman/K. G Mai Unguwa; Kurnar Dakauna/K. G. Mai Unguwa; Zamfarawa/K. G. Mai Unguwa; Madogara II / T. V. Centre
Baure	Yanmaulu	Dangarba/Kofar Maigari; Ung. Turaki/Primary School; Haruna Babba/Primary School; Kwashi/Primary School; Kolori/Primary School; Kumbi/Kofar Maigari; Maitsaidau/Kofar Maigari; Dole/Primary School; Bagena/Kofar Maigari; Madatta/Kofar Maigari; Mantau/Kofar Maigari; Dagara/Kofar Maigari; Dankwaita/Kofar Maigari; Lallu/Primary School; Unguwar Fari/Adult Education Office; Kyaras/Primary School; Boro/Kofar Maigari; Haruna Ta Korau/Kofar Maigari; Yanmaulu Bala/Kofar Maigari; Yanmaulu Magaji/T. V Viewing Centre; Kumbi Fulani/Kofar Hardo; Yanmaulu Mamman/Dispensary
Baure	Babban Mutum	Babban Mutum Galadima/Pri. School; B. Mutum Usman/Town Hall; B. Mutum Ubandawaki/T. V Viewing Centre; Bagemu Isah/Kofar Maigari; Daje/Primary School; Saida Gyada/Kofar Maigari; Kwadage/Primary School; Garin Kadau/Kofar Maigari; Salai Mutari/Primary School; Salai, Dahiru/Primary School; Gure Gari/Kofar Maigari; Gure Fulani/Kofar Hardo; B. Mutum T. Wada-K. G. Alh. Arkaf; Customs House - Custom House
Baure	Taramnawa/Bare	Taramnawa/Primary School; Danchale - Kofar Maigari; Doki A - Primary School; Garin Chinai -Gidin Kurna; Bare - Primary School; Unguwar Isah - Gidin Tsamiya; Kurtu - Gidin Bedi; Dangode - Cikin Gari; Dogon Gamji - Gidin Gamji; Unguwar Sallau - Gidin Gamji; Maikomaiya - Primary School; Danshagira - Kofar Sarkin Fulani; Katsalle - Kofar Maigari; Doki B Kofar Maigari
Baure	Muduri	Baushi - Primary School; Botsotsuwa - Kofar Maigari; Unguwar Gamji Makera Primary School; Unguwar Gamji Mato - Primary School; Kaura - Cikin Gari; Jumburum - Primary School; Yangare - Kofar Maigari; Muduri - Primary School; Muduri - Kofar Gidan Maigari
Baure	Baure	Baure Kofar Arewa - Kofar Maigari; Baure Yamma - Gidan Gona; Baure North - Primary School; Baure Kudu - Primary School; Gadare - Kofar Maigari; Dadin Sarki - Primary School; Kafin Sule - Primary School; Baure Babba - Dispensary; Danbuduma Baure - Kofar Maigari
Baure	Unguwar Rai	Achakwale - Primary School; Bagade - Kofar Maigari; Dangagi - Primary School; Kwabo - Primary School; Kyakyawa - Primary School; Malikawa - Primary School; Wankade - Cikin Gari; Wankade Fulani - Kofar Maigari; Yan Umma - Kofar Maigari; Yanjaji - Primary School; Unguwar Rai A - Primary School; Unguwar Rai B - Kofar Maigari; Kwaryar Salla A, - Primary School; Kwaryar Sallah B, - Cikin Gari; Yantsai I - Primary School; Yantsai II - Primary School
Baure	Kagara/Faski	Unguwar Maigida - Primary School; Maikiliya - Kofar Maigari; Unguwar Kaura - Cikin Gari; Tsaya Kikwana - Cikin Gari; Maimazari - Primary School; Sawani - Cikin Gari; Gadare - Kofar Maigari; Dandogo - Kofar Maigari; Shado - Primary School; Danduku - Kofar Maigari; Kagara - Primary School; Faski A, - Primary School; Kagara Fulani - Kofar Hardo; Faski B, - T. V Viewing Centre; Burududu A, - Kofar Maigari; Burududu B, - Pri School
Baure	Mai Bara	Maibara I - Primaryschool; Maibara II - Primary School; Kawari Mai Cibi - Kofar Maigari; Ung. Delu - Cikin Gari; Kwarin Gawasa - Cikin Gari; Achakwale - Prim. School; Maibara Fulani - Kofar Hardo; Maibara Kuri - Kofar Maigari; Gwarandama - Pri School; Kiriniya - Kofar Maigari
Baure	Hui	Hui A - Kofar Maigari; Baushi Tingatsara - Kofar Maigari; Dantagwarma A - Kofar Maigari; Hurtumi - Kofar Maigari; Ung Chiroma - Kofar Maigari; Kakare - Pri. School; Dashi - Pri. School; Zoda - Pri. School; Torankawa - Pri. School; Gobirawa - Primary School; Gajen - Cikin Gari; Kammasawa - Pri School; Mazare - Pri. School; Dankuliya - Cikin Gari; Wanga - Pri School; Liggel - Primary School; Yajale - Pri School; Yarkiya - Pri. School; Chiciya - Primary School; Kabura - Kofar Maigari; Dantagwarma B Dispensary; Hui B, - Primary School
Baure	Agala	Dankum Pri. School; Kafin Kwance Primary School; Agala Habe Primary School; Agala Fulani - Kofar Hardo; Husamawa; Dorowa Goma - Pri. School; Kirowa / Pry. Sch.; Galadimawa - Cikin Gari; Makanwaci - Cikin Gari; Maimakwami - Cikin Gari; Kafin Kwance - Pri. School; Burmawa; Aya
Bindawa	Kamri	Kamri Ung Dandada/Walawa/R-Tsara-Kamri Pri. Sch. I; Kamri Ung Dandada/Walawa/R-Tsara; Turjanu - Sabon Gari; Yan, Ali - Sabon Gari; Bargai - Famfo; Mundadu/Tsohuwa/Sabuwa/Fakon Wasa; Bardawaiya/Sabke/Hayi/Bardawaiya Pri. Sch.; Yanhamal/Rijiya; Rugar Gumba/Kanyan Rokon Ruwa; Yarmagaji/Yarmagaji Pri. Sch.
Bindawa	Bindawa	Kofar Gabas I Model Pri. School; Kofar Gabas II Model Pri. School; Damargawa-Danyusufa Pri. School; Damargawa II Danyusufa Pri. School; Saulawa - Asibtin Yamma; Ilali - Tasha; Jabara Tuduji - Gidan Katuwa; Rugar Jibir-Kofar Gidan M/Unguwa; Sabaru -Injin Alh. Mohammed; Mantawa/Makera-Tasha; Zango - Yara Bakin Tasha; Tafashiya-Tafashiya Pri. School; Kofar Gabas 1a/Model Pri. School; Sabaru Tuduji/Open Space
Bindawa	Tama/Daye	Tama :A; - Education Office; Jabo/Shadawa II Shadawa Pri. Shool; Gwanza - Pri School; Rugar Suri/Goga - G/Kusa; R/Haruna/Dokaji/Yalwa-Dokaji Pri. School; Dageji Kaskarau - Dageji Pri. School; Gidan Gari/Zango-Zangon Tama; Jabo/Shadawa I - Shadawa Pri. School; Saulawa/Magami - Fako; Daye T/Wada Gudawa Kari-Kofar G/Maigari; R/Baushi/Tuntube-R/Baushi Pri. School; Daye Yolai - Daye Pri. School; Tsini Danga-Dandalintsini; Unguwa Faru-Dandalin Ung. Faru; Ba, Awa - Ba, Awa Pri. School; Rugar Kari-R/Kari Pri. School; Tamac/Kofar Fada; R/Haruna/Dokaji Yalwa/Yalwa Open Space
Bindawa	Faru/Dallaji	Faru Gari - Pri. School; Unguwar Tari -K/G Alh. A/Aziz; Nasarawa/Zaberawa/Nasarawa I; Nasarawa/Zaberawa/Nasarawa II; Tokaru/Tagwai-Kofar Gidan M. Mati; Tofa-Kasuwa; Rugar Idi - Pri. School; Gamda - Pri. School; Kyarmanya - Pri. School; Dallaji Gari Pri. School; Dallaji Zanguna Pri. School; Rugar Jobe-Pri. School; Makaurata - Makaurata; Kuma - Kuma Pri. School; Wali - K/G Maina; Gangare Kofar Gidan Mai Unguwa; Bujawa/Kaji Dadi-Gidin Aduwa
Bindawa	Shibdawa	Shibdawa I Shibdawa Pri. School; Yan, Haruna - Yanharuna; Yanturaki - Yanturaki; Kashin Hanya - Kashin Hanya; Kirya - Kirya; Larabawa - Larabawa; Domawa - Domawa K/G. M/Ung; Yanbaba - K/G Maiunguwa; Agalawa I Pri. School; Agalawa II - Pri. School; Wali - K/G Mai Unguwa; Indina - Ginidin Aduwa; Budawa - Budawa; Zakata I - Zakata Pri. School; Zakata II - Zsakata Pri. School
Bindawa	Jibawa/R, Bade	Rugar Bade - Pri. School; Bami - Kofar Gidan Mai Unguwa; Daniya K/G Daniya; Bangaje - Pri. School; Adarkawa Pri. School; Kuje/Kudi/Makera-Kanya; Jibawa-Gindin Kanya; Yarmagaji - Ung. Liman; Gudawa - Yarkwamre; Yanjalo - Yanjalo; Gimi - Pri. School; Yarkuki - Garin Yarkuki; Tukuyel - Gidin Bedi
Bindawa	Doro	Tuwaru/ Santar Kuka; Tuwaru II Pri. School; Tuwaru Iib, Takarchi; Tuwaru III - Takarchi; Kangiwa I - Kangiwa; Kangiwa II - Kangiwa; Sabon Gari I - Readiing Room; Sabon Gari II - Reading Room; Burma - Burma; Ayubawa - K/G Mai Unguwa; Karkahu I K/G Abdun Sada; Karkahu II - K/G Abdun Sada; Shaiskawa - Gidan Mutun Daya; Eka - Gindin Kanya; Kangiwa 1a, Kangiwa; Sabon Gari III/Reading Room
Bindawa	Yangora	Kasganya - K/G Mai Unguwa; Kura - Kura Pri. School; Yandadi - K/G Mai Unguwa; Dadawa - Tudun Wada; Jama'a Yangora - Jama'a Pri. School; Yangora - G. D. S. S. Yangora; Dangarna - Dangarna Pri. School; Kaura - Kaura Pri. School; Zabgau - K/G Maiunguwa; Digga - K/G Liman Adamu; Yandadi II/K/G Yangora
Bindawa	Giremawa	Gudawa/Sabon Gari-Islamiyya; Unguwar Makada - T. V Viewing Centre; Kangi - Islamiyya; Mallamawa - Chediya; Aisawa - Pri. School; Santar Bila -Kwakwara; Yan, Nagani - Kagadama; Fango Jamaa - Jamaa Alh. Tukur; Fango Daguraji - Daguraji Pri. School; Tsatsarnaka Pri. School; Unguwar Makada/T. V Centre
Bindawa	Gaiwa	Magami/Islamiya - /Slamiya; Bade Salihawa - Open Space; Marau - Gamji Ung. Sanda; Makera - Famfo; Magami/Yansaura - Kukar Magami; Gaiwa Kurmi - Kalgon Gaiwa Kurmi; Badalle Garyal - Open Space; Taka Tsaba/Sankasa - Takatsaba; Magami Islamiya/Islamiya
Charanchi	Charanchi	K/Gidan Mai Unguwa Tanimu; K/Gidan Mai Unguwa T.; K/Gidan Mai Unguwa U/Kwana; Primary School Wajje I; Health Centre. Tsaski; Kankawa; Primary School T/ Dole 'A'; Primary School / T/ Dole 'B'; Primary School Hanaye; Open Space K/Yamma; K/Gidan Mai Unguwa Binoni; K/Gidan Mai Unguwa Kwana; Primary School Waje II; Women Centre Tashar Dutsi; Primary School Mazaga; Primary School Kekeriya P. S; T. V Viewing Centere Walawa
Charanchi	Safana	Damakwaro A Open Space; Kuki Kg / Mai Ung.; Bajinawa Pri. School; Safana Gabas I Pri. School; Safana Yamma Pri. School; Safana Gabas II Health Center; Damakwaro B, K/G Mai Unguwa
Charanchi	Radda	Banoma Pri. School; Dan Maigari K/G Mai Gari; Dar Masai Open Space; Kadanya I K/G Mai Unguwa; Billiri Open Space; Farfaru K/G Mai Unguwa; Unguwar Dogo Open Space; Zana Danshurwa K/G Mai Unguwa; Sabon Gari K/G Mai Unguwa; Katuka Pri. School; Dangaladima Health Centre; Kadanya II Pri. School
Charanchi	Majen Wayya	Baran Gizo Pri. School; Dallawa/Sawai Pri. School; Kebe Nasarawa Pri. School; Fadumawa K/G Mai Unguwa; Maje East Health Centre; Maje South Health Centre; Maje West I Pri. School; Dallawa/Dagawa K/G Mai Unguwa; Maloli Open Space; Kaskanoki Pri. School; Sabaru/Ruddube K/G Mai Unguwa; Maje West II Pri. School; Maje East II Pri. School; Fadumawa Open Space
Charanchi	Ganuwa	Burtu Pri. School; Ganuwa North Pri. School; Dawan Gamji K/G Mai Unguwa; Danjakka Pri. School; Dokau Open Space; Gamraki K/G Maiunguwa; Dabganya Pri. School; Dinkawa Pri. School
Charanchi	Tsakatsa	Gidan Banye Mai Unguwa; Dafara K/G Mai Unguwa; Ruga/ Kg Mai Unguwa; Garazawa K/G Mai Unguwa; Tsakatsa West Pri. School; Gamda Rufogi Open Space; Zango K/G Mai Unguwa
Charanchi	Koda	Koda Pri. School; Gidan Ajiya G/Mai Unguwa; Kwanar Yamma Pri. Sch.; Sake Pri School; Kwanan Yamma Pri. School; Dokau G/Mai Unguwa; Farin Ruwa Pri. School
Charanchi	Kuraye	Gawasu K/G Mai Ung.; Chediya II Health Centre; Galadima Pri. School; Ganasu K/G Mai Unguwa; Bagga G/Mai Unguwa; Yarawala G/Mai Unguwar; Saarwake G/Mai Unguwa; Rugar Wake Pri. School; Unguwar Liman G/Liman; Kwarawa G/Mai Unguwa; Sago G/Mai Unguwa; Yana Pri. School; Marina West Health Centre
Charanchi	Banye	Banye A Pri. School; Yanuku I G/Mai Unguwa; Saname K/G Mai Unguwa; Yanuku II Gidan Liman; Kagadama K/Mai Unguwa; Banye 'B' Health Centre; Salgoriyo Open Space; Sargolio Open Space; Yanuku Open Space
Dandume	Mahuta A	Mahuta Yamma/Kofar Gidan M/Ung; Mahuta B/T. V Centre; Mahuta Yamma C,/K/G. Dan-Azumi; Mahuta Kudu/Islamiyya; Ung. Alh. Sani Tela/Pri School; Kauran Fawa/Kg. M//Ung; Kauran Fawa B/K/G. Dan-Kano; Ung. Jika/K/G. M/Ung; Ung. Sarkin Rafi/K/G M/Ung Tambaya; Ung. Lima/K/G. Mal Babba; Gyazama/K/G. Alh. Sadi; Layin Mahauta/K/G. M/Ung
Dandume	Mahuta B	Mahuta Arewa/Kofar Gidan Zayyana; Marinai/Mahuta Pri. School; Gwai Gwaye/Gwaigwayen Liman; Ung Baban Aufu/K/G M/Ung; Ung. Dan. Atiku/K/G M/Ung; Ung. Al-Kasim/K/G M/Ung; Layin Nepa/K/G. Salisu Nepa; Zagamawa/Kofar Lima; Kaliyawa/K/G Alh. Ummaru; Layin Alh. Bala K/G Alh. Bala
Dandume	Mahuta C	Dogon Kawu/K/G. Dan-Gaga; Ung. Dan-Kudan/K/G Alh. Sani Alamara; Ung. Dan-Kudan/K/G M. Ung; Mai Tsattsala/K/G. Mai-Baka; Dan Darau/Pri. School; Ung. Mai-Gayya/K/G. M/Ung; Ung Sarkin Rafi B/Katoge; Ung Sako/Pri. School; Ung. Zango/K/G. M. Abdu; Ung. Nuhu K/G. Liman Sani
Dandume	Dandume A	Sayyadi/Dispensary; Sayyadi B/K/G/Ung; Ung. Abasawa/K/G. M/Ung; Dan Sarki/K/G. Alh. Ibrahim N. Godo; Idi Kola/K/G M/Ung; Makama I Pri. School; Kasimu/K/G. Kasimu; Kasim B/Tsohon Gidan Alh. Yusuf; Ung. Shugaba 'B' K/G Idi Dan-Eta; Ung. Shugaba II K/G. Shugaba; Ung. Ango/K/G. M/Ung; Layin Shehi/K/G Shehi; Makama II/Model Pri. School; Ung. Shugaba II/K/G. M/Ung
Dandume	Dandume B	Ung. Kandamba/K/G. M/Ung; Ung Ayuba/K/G M/Ung; Ung. Alh. Hanau/K/G Alh. Hanau; Bango/Zari/K/G. M/Ung; Ung. Abubakar/K/G M/Ung; Ung. Mato/K/G. Mato; Ung. Umaru/K/G Sa, Idu Dan-Kirki; Ung. Dare/K/G M/Ung; Ung. Hanau/K/G. M/Ung; Jiruwa/K/G. M/Ung; Ung. Bagudu/K/G M/Ung; Sabuwar Ung/K/G M/Ung
Dandume	Tumburkai A	Kauran Katuka Gari I/Pri. School; Kauran Katuka Tsakiya/Sabon Gida; Tumburkai Gari/Pri. School; Tumburkai Kofar Shantali/Kofar Shantali; Tumburkai Yamma/Allah Na Nan; Tumburkai Arewa/Ung. Audi; Tumburkai Kudu/Ung. Waziri; Kumuji/K/G. M/Ung; Badon Bawa/K/G. M/Ung; Ung. Kato/Dutsi/K/G Alh. Bala; Kauran Katuka Gari II/Pri. School
Dandume	Tumburkai B	Yakurutu/Layin Kadanya; Yakurutu/Baraje Pri. School; Jidadi/K/G M/Ung; Barkan Habe K/G M/Ung; Ung. Ilu Dan. Sallau/Tsakiyar Gari; Ganwai Alasan/K/G M/Ung; Kaura Alasan/K/G/ M/Ung; Ung. Shatambaya/K/G M/Ung; Ung. Yarima/Ruwan Ango/K/G M/Ung
Dandume	Dantankari	Ashafawa/K/G. M/Ung Kasimu; Dantankari Gari/Dakin Shawara; Kadawar Mai Komo/Kofar Gidan Jume; Kurmin Chakara/K/G Halilu; Ung. Gamba/Pri. School; Kadawar Magajin Asika/K/G. Salisu; Gyazama/Kofar Gidan Kani; Sabuwar Kadawa/Pri. School; Ung. Mujiya/K/G M/Ung
Dandume	Magaji Wando A	Magaji Wando/T. V Centre; Sabo Gida/Sabon Gida; Ung. Doro/Pri. School; Dallawar Gabas/Dallawar Gabas; Dallawar Kudu/Dallawar Kudu; Ung. Na Maska/Ung. Na-Maska; Kachillo/Kachillo; Ung. Tsoho/Ung Tsoho; Ung. Albasu/Pri. School; Ung. Bawa/K/G. M/Ung
Dandume	Magaji Wando B	Ung. M. Hajji K/G Ung. Na Baba; Ung. Dan Soda/Dan-Soda Pri. School; Dan Mayakin Karofi/K/G M/Ung Shehu; Ung. Mai Aradu/Pri. School; Ung. Daudu B/Ung. Daudu; Ung. Daudu C /Ung Daudu; Dungun Sambo A/Dungun Sambo; Dungun Sambo B/Badole; Ung. Magina/K/G M/Ung.
Danja	Jiba	Gidandawa/Gagarau Tsakiya Open Space; Gobirawa/Abasawa Tsakiya Open Space; Unguwar Balarabe Open Space 1; Unguwar Balarabe Open Space II; Magogo Gidan M. Yusuf; Jiba K/Gidan Maiunguwa; Zage Zagi Gidan Alh. Bala; Yalwa Pri. School; Ung. Bawa K/Gidan M/Unguwa; Ung. Barau Unguwar Barau; Layin Mahauta Near M/Ung. House; Ung Madaki Unguwar Madaki; Karofi Karofi; Yalwa Tsakiya Balarabe C
Danja	Tandama	Buzaye/Ung. Habibu Tsakiya Open Space; Ung. Dantalle Ung. Dantalle Open Space; Rafin Gora Gari; Koki Pri. School; Bare Bari K/Maiunguwa; Tandama/R/Basai Near Sarki House Open Space; Ung. Tafida Gidan M. Musa; Tandama Yamma Yar Yara; Rabeji K/Maiunguwa; Sandada Sandada Open Space; Ung Rogo Ung. Rogo; Ung. Tsamiya Ung. Tsamiya; Tatarin Makama Tatarin Makama; Tatarin Tatarin Fulani; Sarkin Fada S/Fada; Rafin Gora Gari Open Space
Danja	Danja A	Danja Gari Tsariya T. V Centre; Danja Gari Court Area; Danja Gari Tsakiiya Near M/Gari House; Danja Gari Tsakiya Yar Yara; Danja K/Gabas Near S/Kasuwa House; Ung. Malamai Un G. Malamai; Karofi Filin Tukwane; Majedo Pri. School; Dandaudu 1 Gidan Jamo Open Space; Dandaudu II Ung. Sallau Pri. School; Ung. Magaji Gidan Jibir; Janda Gidan Alh. Danbaba; Daura Gidan Bala Namarka; Doka Doka Pri. School; Rafin Kara Gidan M/Karaye Gidan Maikaraye; Danja/Karofi Cediyar Masallaci; Danja Gari Gindin Bagaruwa
Danja	Danja B	Danja T/Kasuwa Pri. Health Centre; Danja T/Kasuwa Dispensary; Danja A K/Kudu Pri. School; Danja B K/Kudu Pri. School; Danja C K/Kudu Pri. School; Tatarin Habe Mangwaro; Dogo Dawa Dogon Dawa; Dorayi G/Alh. Yambe; Rinji Gidan Alh. Baushe; Ung. Bala Gidan Shara; Tsintsiya Pri. School; Danja K/Kudu Model Quranic School; Danja D K/Yamma/Sabon Fegi Near M/Ung. Nabayi House; Danja K/Yamma S/Fegi - Bakin Kwalta; Danja E Yartasha
Danja	Tsangamawa	Ung. Waziri Near Waziri House; Dauraku Near Inda House; Maizuma Near Abduk House; Ung. Abdulkarim Ung Abdulkarim I; Babban Rafi A Pri School II; Babban Rafi B Pri School; Kauran Fawa Near M/Ung. House; Tabanni Gidan Nalabbe; Tsangamawa Pri. School; Madawaki Near M/Ung. House; Ung. Gero Pri. School; Mashiginkada M/Kada Pri School; Sarki Fada Pri. School; Dundubus Near M/Ung. House; Tsangamawa Arewa Dusten Reme Bakin Hanya
Danja	Dabai	Dabai Gabas Pri School; Dabai Yamma Near Rabo Rogo House; Dabai Yamma B Near Maigari House; Dabai Tsakiya Near Magaji House; Ung. Yusuf Aduwa Open Space; Tafida Arewa Near M/Ung. House; Ung. Tafida Gabas Near Bawa House; Ung Bala Gabas Dabai Pri School; Ung. Bala Yamma Makera Open Space; Madawaki Gidan Naladi; Ung. Danbirni Madaki Pri. School; Ung. Jajaye Near Alh. Sadau House; Gidan Naladi G/Naladi/Madakin Open Space; Ung. S/Noma Gidan S/Noma; Dabai Gari Ktarda Project Quarters; Dabai Gari Filin Haya / Aduwa
Danja	Yakaji A	Ung. Jamo A Near M/Ung. House; Ung. Jamo B Pri. School; Shaiskawa Near Lamis House; Ung. Yankaji Yankaji Pri. School; Ung. Danmalam Near Danmalam House; Ung. Sodangi Ung. Sodangi Open Space; Gidan Amadu Near Bala Yaro House; Ung. Rinji Near Tukur House; Ung. Dikko Gidan Yanbita; Gidan Shanono Gidan Shanono; Gidan Abdu Gidan Abdu; Kokami A Shaiskawa; Kokami B Shaikawa; Kokami C T. V Centre; Kokami Gari Gidan S/Magina; Tashar Kade Tashar Kade
Danja	Yakaji B	Ung. Makera Gidan Makera Open Space; Doka Near Mudis House; Ung. Sai Sai Pri. School; Bazanga Gari/H. Baz Tsakiya Open Space; Bazanga Bazanga; Gidan Garba Fankau Tsakiya Open Space; Kirare Kirare; Ung. Sambo/U. Adamu Tsakiya Open Space; Ung. Ada G/Alh. Ada; Ung. Umaru Ung. Lalle; Dandaga Garin M Dandanga G. Malam Open Space; Alhayazawa D/Banjeni Danbanjeni; Tudun Jae K/Gidan Al. Haliru; Ung. Ango K/Gidan M/Ung
Danja	Kahutu A	Kahutu A Pri. School; Kahutu B Gidan Mabuga; Kahutu C Gidan Rimi; Kahutu D Gidan Bajida; Abdulkarim A Hurgu; Abdulkarim B Gidan M/Ung. Sani; Abdulkarim C Hurgu; Ung. Sale A Gidan Sale; Ung. Sale B Gidan Daniya; Ung. Madaki Wangarawa Open Space; Madaki Gidan Alh. Zuga; Kahutu - Rafin Barwa
Danja	Kahutu B	Dan Maigauta A Pri School; Dan Maigauta B Near M/Ung House; Dan Maigauta C Near M/Ung House; Ung. Yakubu Near Alh. Maude House; Kwari Near M/Ung. House; Ung. Fure Near M/Ung House; Ung. Madaki/G. D. Malam At Fili Open Space; Ung. Umaru G/Maiung. Barau; Chediya A Pri School; Chediya B Gidan Jatau Open Space; Ung. Bala Near Bala House; Chediya C Tsakiya Open Space
Dan Musa	Mara	Mara A Pri. School; Mara B Dispensary; Unguwar Ali Zamfara A Yara; Unguwar Ali Zamfara B Kwakwara Gora; Ung. Samaila Zamfara Gangara; Ung. Samaila Zamfara B K/Gidan A Yahaya; Ung. Makama Pri. School; Bichi Nasarawa Pri School; Gamkai Gamkai; Shawaire Pri School; Sakwatawa Pri School; Dutsen Dadi Pri. School; Marke Pri. School; Ung. Gyada/Salihawa - Salihawa; Gazarwai/Isalihawa -Gazarwa
Dan Musa	Dan Alkima	Nasarawa A Pri. School; Nasarawa B Pri. School; Dan Alkima - Alkima; Daftau/Abugawa Daftau Pri. School; Ung. Makera - Makera Pri School; Dantakuri A Pri School; Dantakuri/Ung Jido - Ung Jido; Gidan Dankwando Gidan Dan Kwando; Bare Barin Masana Pri. School I; Bare Barin Masana Pri. School II; Ung. Adan Ung Adan; Aidun Hassan Aidun Hassan; Domawa - Pri. School; Dafa - Dafa
Dan Musa	Dan Musa A	Sabon Gari A Pri. School; Sabon Gari B Pri. School; Ung. Sanda Health Centre I; Ung. Sanda Health Centre II; Ung. Sanda B Health Centre; Ung. Mati Jagulau; Ung, Baballe 'A' Yarima Pri. School; Ung. Baballi 'B' Yarima Pri School; Ung. Amadi K. G Amadi I; Ung. Amadi K/G Amadi II; Ung. Dantiye A. Abubakar Pri. Sch.; Ung. Dantiye 'B' Gabachin Kasuwa
Dan Musa	Dan Musa B	Gerecen Anna/G. Kanawa - Gerecen Anna; Ung. Kanawa - Ung. Kanawa; Aidun Gadaje Pri School; Aidun Mangwaro Aidun Mangwaro; Gurzar Gamji Pri School; Gurzar Kuka Pri. School; Shaka Fito/Mairabon Tuwo; Kurechi/Barza - Kureci/Barza
Dan Musa	Dan Ali	Dan Ali North Pri School; Dan Ali South Dispensary I; Dan Ali South Dispensary II; Dan Ali Gabasawa Dan Ali Gabasawa; Amarawa North Pri School; Amarawa South Pri. School; Amarawa Gidan Matsau - Gidan Matsau; Kanawa - Kanawa; Tashar Biri Pri School; Tashar Kadanya - Tasha Kadanya; Gadawa Pri. School; Lungu - Lungu
Dan Musa	Mai Dabino A	Maidabino Noth Dispensary; Maidabino South Pri School; Maidabino East T. V View Centre; Dacci/Kunduma Dacci/Kuduma; Yaya /Kangar Dutse - Yaya Pri. School; Kulere/Runka A Kulere Pri School; Kulere/Runka B Kulere/Runka B; Yalwari -Yalwari; Ung. Lawo Mailafiya - Ung Lawo Mailafiya; Tabarau Gari Pri. School; Sabon Garin Tabarau Pri School; Tsattsagi Gari Pri School; Tsattsagi Ung, Maidarasu T. Ung. Maidarasu
Dan Musa	Mai Dabino B	Gobirawa Buda Pri. School; S/Garin Gobirawa Pri School; Falale Dan-Ali A; Falale Dan-Ali B; Leletu Pri. School; Makuka Pri School; Ung. Zagadi Ung Zagadi; Rugar Dan Malam; Ung. Lawo/Mailafiya -Ung. Lano/Mailafiya; Dunya 'A' Pri School; Dunya B Pri School; Dangeza Pri. School
Dan Musa	Dandire A	Dandire 'A' Dispensary; Dandire 'B' Pri. School; Dandire Ung. Dau - Ung. Dau; Kabuke A Pri School; Kabuke 'B' Pri. School; Farwa Pri. School; Farwa Burwaye Farwa Burwaye; Kaiga Gari Pri School; Ajiwa/Mai Kwaura - Ajiwa/Mai Kwaura; Awalar Mai Kano - A. Mai Kano
Dan Musa	Dandire 'B'	Dantudu 'A' Pri School; Dandutu 'B' Pri. School; D/Tudu Ranji/Dankamtsa-D/T. R/Dankamtsa; Ung. Malami 'A' Pri School; Ung. Malami 'B' Pri School; Jigawa Sawai Jigawa; Gobirawar Hassan - Gobirawar Hassan; Hankibiri Pri School; Dufar Mato - Dufar Mato; Dufar Sama/Tuburi-Tuburi
Dan Musa	Yan-Tumaki A	Yantumaki North Day Sec. School; Yantumaki South - Model Pri School I; Yantumaki South - Model Pri School II; Yantumaki Central I T. V. Centre; Yantumaki Central II T. V. Centre; Yantumaki Centre II - Yar Dorowa; Yara -Yara; Yardanko - Yardanko; Fafawa-Fafawa; Kwarare -Kwarare; Jirga - Jirga
Dan Musa	Yan-Tumaki B	Tashar Icce Pri. School; Tashar Kaura - Tashar Kaura; Maigezoji -T/Alewa Pri. School; Dacci/Zakau/Karda-Dacci/Zaukau Karda; Dacci/Cakau/Karda; Yashi/Rugar Gyada-Yashi Pri School; Rugar Gyada/Kanawa-Kanawa; Kwantakwamawa - Kwantakwamawa; Katsalle Pri School
Daura	Sarkin Yara A	Kofar Baru I Gidan Famfo; Kofar Baru II Dan Mainna; Kofar Baru III Gidan Niyam; Unguwar Kudu I S. Yaki; Unguwar Kudu II Gidan Baki; Unguwar Kaura I Dakin Sharar Dole; Ung. Kaura Kusa Da Injin Ali; Unguwar Kaura III Kofar M. Sani; Unguwar Liman I Gindin Famfo; Unguwar Liman II Gabas Da Titi; Unguwar Liman III Magama Hudu; Kofar Baru IV Kusa Da Gidan Hajiya Atti; Kofar Barui V Shadambu Lowcost Pri. Sch; Unguwar Liman Gabas Da Titi; Ung. Kaura Dakin Sharar Dole
Daura	Sarkin Yara B	Garake I Kofar A. Ibrahim; Garakeiii K/Abdu Na'ada; Garake II K/W. W Na Ruwa; Baruma I Gidan Sarki; Baruma II Kofar Bai; Baruma III Kofar Majidadi; Danshamaki 1 Chediyar Tafarki; Danshamaki II Islamiyya Pri. School; Matsiga Bakin Famfo; Matsiga II K/M Goto; Rijiyar Dadi I Social Welfare; Mastiga III Bakin Titi; Rajiyar Dadiii Kusa Da Kofar Kudu; Rajiyar Dadi Kofar Altine; Danshamari Chediyar Tafarki; Rijiyar Idi Kofar Altine; Dan Shamaki III/ Islamiyya Primary School
Daura	Ubandawaki A	Majema I Daura I Pri. School; Majema II Daura I Pri, School; Majema III Magama Hudu; Majemsa IV Kofar Gidan Dangiwa; Madabu I T. Junction; Madabu II Jibbin Bake; Tashar Kasuwa I Kofar Sankira; Tashar Kasuwa II - Rijiyar Adare; Tarshar Kasuwa III Kusada G/Sarkin Aiki; Majema IV Daurama Pri. School; Madabu III Famfon Kurma
Daura	Unbadawaki B	Kofar Arewa I Daura II Pri School; Kofar Arewa II Daura II Pri. School; Kofar Arewa II Zonal Education Office; Godai/G. S. S I Daura G. S. S Daura; Godai/Ganga Kofar Mai Unguwar; Bakin Kasuwa I Kofar Gidan Chairman; Bakin Kasuwa II Kusa Dakotu; Bakin Kasuwa III Arewa Da Kasuwa; Godai I Pri. School; Filin Holo Bawo Primary School; Ganga Cikin Gari; Godai G. S. S II Pri. School; Bakin Kasuwa Arewa Da Kasuwa
Daura	Kusugu	Fada Babba I Titin Daura I Pri. School; Fada Babba II Kofar M. Mai Nazari; Sarkin Fada III Kafar Alkalin Baure; Famfon Ashura; Sarkin Fada V Kofar Sani; S/Fada I Gefen Titi; S/Fada II K/S/Foda; S/Fada II K/Alkalin Bature; Dan Giwa I K. Tajo; Dan Giwa II K. Galadima; Bakin Masallachi K. M. Dantoki; Ung Yandi Kofar Liman Rabe; Ung. Yandi Junction; Ung Yandi Kusa Da Junction
Daura	Mazoji A	Mazoji I Pri. School; Mazoji II Adult. Education Centre; Mazoji III Kofar Ardo; Yamadawa K/M/ Ung.; Yamadawa II Kosa Da Mai Unguwar; Tambu I Kofar Dan. Dauda; Tambu II Pri. School; Tambu III Kusa Da. K. Dauda; Tambu Tudu I Cikin Gari; Sabon Gari Cikin Gari
Daura	Mazoji B	Sharifawa I Kofar Mai Unguwa; Sharifawa II Pri. School; Dannakola A Pri. School; Dan Nakola B Pri. School; Dannakola Kaye Kofar Mai Gari; Kamfawa I Pri. School; Danheji I Kofar Gidan Maigari; Kamfawa II Cikin Gari; Sharifawa / Bela Gidan Taba; Danheji Pri School
Daura	Madobi A	Sukwanawa I. G. Maigari; Sukwanawa II Pri. Sch.; Sudujie Pri. Sch.; Suduje II Pri. Sch.; Jeme Ks Masallachi; Madobi I Kalgo Kurbaje; Madobi II Pri. School; Kandawa K/Gidan Zakari; Zari I Gonar Jauro; Zari II K/G Hardo; Bugaje K/G Mai Unguwa; Bundubuki Pri. School
Daura	Madobi B	Kurneji I Pri. Sch.; Kurneji II Pri. Sch.; Bojo I Ung. Gamji; Bojo II Pri. Sch.; Shamadara I Pri. School; Shamadara II G. M. Unguwa; Sharawa I Bugaje; Turumni I Pri. Sch.; Turumni II Sabon Gari; Durmawa I K/M Yakubu; Durmawa II K/M Sha'aibu; Jabu G. Mai Unguwa; Sharawa II Garche; Sharawa III Fulani; Bauni Pri. Sch.
Dutsi	Dan Aunai	Dardar I Pri School; Dan Aunai/Radi I Pri. School; Dan Aunai/Radi II Rade; Dogere K/Gidan Mai Ung.; Jiling Daddo K/Gidan Mai Ung; Kage K/Gidan Mai Ung; K/Burtu I & II Pri School; Kudundumawa K/Gidan Mai Ung.; Sha' El K/Gidan Mai Tsamiya; Sobashi I Pri. School; Sobashi II Pri. School; Yatso/Jilinga Pri. School; Dardar II Pri. School
Dutsi	Ruwankaya A	Dungunawa/Duguneji Dandali; Jora K/Gidan Mai Ung.; Kafin Labo I K/Gidan Mai Ung; Kafina Labo II Dandali; Minawa Pri. School; Ruwan Kaya Pri. School; Tamaje Pri. School
Dutsi	Ruwankaya B	Finningere K/Gidan Mai Ung; Madawa K/Gidan Mai Ung; Magami K/Gidan Mai Ung; Matsakawa K/Gidan Mai Ung.; Raba Pri. School; Rabare K/Gidan Mai Ung
Dutsi	Dutsi A	Dutsi I Dutsi Pri. School; Dutsi B/Kasuwa II Vet. Clinic; Dutsi III Women Centre; Dutsi Santa K/Gidan Wakili; Dutsawa I K/Gidan S/Fulani; Dutsawa II Pri. School; Gallawa I K/Gidan Galadima; Gallawa II K/Gidan Alh. Magaji; Shifali K/Gidan Galadima; Dutsi II Dutsi Pri. School
Dutsi	Dutsi B	Biyata K/Gidan Alh. Abu; Kaiwuri K/Gidan Magaji; Kumbursa K/Gidan Maigari; Kuya K/Gidan Alh. Barami; Maichinawa/D. Kemu I Pri. School; Machinawa/D. Kemu II Pri. School; Machnawa D/Kudu K/Gidan Yarimai; Yan Yabo K/Gidan Magaji Doki
Dutsi	Yamel A	Jigawar Turke Dandali Maikanya; Jigawar Tomo Pri. School; Makoda Bagga Pri. School; Makoda Gari K/Gidan Makoda; Shabeji/Makaurachi Pri. School; Yamel/Fakarewa I Pri. School; Yamel/Fakarewa II Pri. School
Dutsi	Yamel B	Balare/Tara Pri. School; Beguwa Pri. School; Dagezamu I Maken Sh.; Dagezamu II K/Gidan Mai Ung.; Dagezamu Samawa - Samawa; Gudawa Dinya Mai Randa; Farin Haki Tanki; Tashar Wali Pri. School
Dutsi	Sirika A	Ba, El Pri. School; Dakawa K/Gidan Liman; Gwammawa B/Rijiya; Karawa Unguwar Duhu; Rijiya Pri. School; Sirka Gabas Pri. School; Sirika Yamma Kanrake; Tuduyal Kanyar G. Namiji
Dutsi	Sirika B	Bengel K/Gidan Alh. Baiko; Bujawa K/Gidan Liman; Dubawa Gamji Garin Gamji; Dubawa Gari Pri. School; Dubawa Kotu - Kotu; Gurjiya K/Gidan Liman; Kalgore Kwakwara; Karemi Pri. School; Nagatau K/Gidan Mai Unguwa; Nagatau/Wakadama Wakadama
Dutsi	Kayawa	Doge I / Gidan Magaji Manu; Doge/Game K/Kidan Idi; Farin Shuri K/Gidan Maigari; Gazari K/Gidan Maigari; Giginya I Pri. School; Giginya II K/Gidan Mai Unguwa; Kayawa Pri. School; Kayawa/Gamji - Gamji; Kura I & II K/Gidan Zakara; Makan Gara Pri. School; Nareje Dandali; S/Garin Farin Shuri K/Gidan Alh. Gambo
Dutsin-Ma	Dutsin-Ma A	Reading Room; Yandaka P. S - P. S; Districit Head Kofar Fada; Falelen D. S Falalan Wambai; Rumfar Amadu Ung. Abdu; Rumfar Amadu Ung Abdu; Kofar Gidan J. Sambo Ung Dabino A; Kofar Gidan J. Sambo - Ung Dabino B; Sada P. S Islamiya P. S. I; Sada P. S Islamiya P. S.; Filin Yan Kifi Gidan Baki I; Ofishin Nepa Bariki I; Ofishin Nepa Barki II; P. S. Danbalaku; Lowcost Shagari Lowcost; Yarima P. S Ung/Mai Saje; Yarima Primary School; Primary School Yandaka P. S; Gidan Garba B. Co-Operative; Gidan Maiung - Ung Sale Bahadeje; Ung. Sale B. M/Ung; Ung. Ami Saje Yarima P. S
Dutsin-Ma	Dutsin-Ma B	Pri School Tashar Kasuwa; Open Space Ung/Kashe Naira I; Open Space Ung/Kashe Naira II; Locost U. P. E/Lowcost; Bayan Gidan Yarima Kofar Fada A; B/Gidan Yarima Kofar Fada B; Open Space Ung Bugaje A; Open Space Ung/Bugaje B; S/Garin Safana K/V/Mai Ung; T. V. Centre S/Garin Safana; Bayan Area Filin Wassa I; Bayan Area Filin Wasa II; Open Space Gago/Wawaye; Open Space Hayin Zaki; T. V Centre Rowan Durawa; Dispensary Kagara North; Sokoto Rima Sokoto Rima; T. V Centre Tashar Kasuna; Gidan Sale Shahura A; Dispensary Shahura B; Shahura/Gidan Sale K; Shahura/Dispensary
Dutsin-Ma	Shema	Kofar G. Maiung. Danyadana; Kofar G. Maiung Nasarawa; Ung Yarwashe Fararu/Yarwashe; Kofar G. Maiung Muri; Kofar G. Maiung Taske/Yan Yalbi; Pri. School / Gizawa; Shema P. S Shama Gari/Waje; T. V. Centre H/Gada/Kuimi; P. S. Gada South; T. V Centre Hayin Gada /Kuimi; P. S / Hayin Gada/South
Dutsin-Ma	Karofi A	Pri. School Kundawa A; Gidan A. Haruna / Hayin Korama; Dispensary Mashawarta; Pri. School Danyadina; Pri. School Makaranta; G/Bala Chali; Open Space Giginya/Jabda; Pri. School Taura; Tashar Wakaza Wakaza; Primary School Rema
Dutsin-Ma	Karofi B	K/G Magaji Dunya Janganta; Pri. School Katanga; Pri. School Tsaka/Dagurba; K/G/A Isa Daka; Open Space Kofar Fada; Pri. School Faguwa; Dispensary Rai; Gidan/Liya Karhi; Bakin Kasuwa Kofar Yamma; T. V Centre Sabuwar Tasha
Dutsin-Ma	Kuki A	Gindin Durawa Gajuna I; Gindin Kadanya Gajuna II; Gidin Bedi Kofar Fada; Gidin Faru Kyarma I; Pri. School Kyarama II; Cediya Salihawar/V/Marke; A & B Tashar Ala; T. V Centre Ajin Yaki Da Jahilchi; Primary School Fan Amale
Dutsin-Ma	Kuki B	Gidan Kyari; K/G/Maiung Sagawa; K/G/Maiung Tsawa Tsawa; Gachi P. S Gachi; Dispensary Dantakiri; Gindin Islamiya Amanzar; Pri. School Zango; Pri. School Gandi
Dutsin-Ma	Kutawa	Pri. School Karofawa; K/G/Mai Ung Shantalawa; P. S Ashata; Garhi P. S. Garhi; Pri. School Takatsaba; Open Space - Buturkai; K/G/Mai Ung. Tabobi; Dispensary Badole; Open Space - Chediya Tara; Pri. School - Yanruma; Garhi P. S
Dutsin-Ma	Bagagadi	T. B Centre Bagagadi North; Prischool Bagagadi South; Yalwa Open Space Yalwa / Tsaska; Pri. School Bajinawa; Open Space Badole/Garbande; U/Manoma - Kurra/Katoge; Fakon A. Amadu Sahuwa; Pri. School Sanchi; Pri. School Dage Lawal; Open Space Kuka Kogo
Dutsin-Ma	Dabawa	Fassada/S/Gona Pri. School; Danzangi Pri. School; Kwantamawa P. S; Darawa Pri. School; Maitsani Pri. School; Fatarawa Gindin Dorawa; Gammo Gindin Kalgo; Yan Albassa R/M Tashar Wada; Dabawa/Gamzoka P. S I; Dabawa/Gamzoka P. S II
Faskari	Yankara	Yankara Gabas/Kofar Gidan Mai Unguwa; Yankara Tsakiya/Kofar Gidan Magaji I; Yankara Arewa/Model Pri. School; Sabon Layi K/G. Mai Ung D/Kobo; Sabon Layi A/K/Gidan Ta, Abamu; Sabon Layi B,/Ik/Gidan Alh. Waisu; Ung. Ruwan Ciwo/K/G Auta Mai Waina; Layin Yamma/K/G/Mai Ung. R/Ciwo; Layin Yamma Tsakiya /K/G Yahaya Mai Kara; Sarkin Arewa/Bayan Tasha K/G A. Iliya; Sarkin Makera K/G Mai Unguwa Haruna; Ali Kere/K/G Mai Unguwa; Zagami Gari/K/G Mai Unguwa; Unguwar Mai Kanwa/Pri. School; Unguwa Kafa/Kofar Gidan Mai Unguwa; Dogon Awo/Kofar Gidan Alh. Musa; Unguwar Barau/Kofar Gidan Maiunguwa; Unguwar Mai Giya/Kofar Gidan Mai Ung.; Yan Kara Project/K/G A. Ali Mai Gwanjo; Dogon Awo/K/G. Mai Unguwa; Zagami/Ung. Biri/Kg. M. Abdulahhi Tanko
Faskari	Sheme	Sheme Kamfani Pri. School; Sheme Yamma Pri. School I; Sheme Yamma Pri. School II; Sheme Gabas Kofar Gidan Mai Gari; Sheme Kudu P. H. C.; Nasarawa Isa Badole; Nasarawa Gari Pri. School; Ung. Hayaki Kofar Gidan Mai Unguwar; Nasarawa Matseri Kofar Gidan Mai Unguwa; Ung. Boka Kofar Gidan Mai Unguwa; Ung. Sarki Kofar Gidan Mai Unguwa; Kurmin Doka Kofar Gidan Mai Unguwa; Bangori Kofar Gidan Mai Unguwa
Faskari	Mairuwa	Ung. Maje Kofar Gidan M/Unguwa; Kadirawa Kofar Gidan Tsalha; Unguwar Madawaki K/G Madawaki; Unguwar Maikara Court Premises; Unguwar Musa, Kofar Gidan Musa; Ung. Iro Kofar Gidan Bahago; Dakamawa Kofar Gidan M. Lawal; Belle K/G Mai Ung. Lado; Mairuwa Yamma K/G Ahmadu Na Gusau; Unguwar Madawaki 'B' K/G Alh. Barau; Ung. Kurmi Kofar Gidan A. Ibrahim
Faskari	Daudawa	Daudawa Gari Kofar Alarama; Daudawa Gari Television Viewing Centre; Ung. Kosau Kofar Gidan Village Head; Daudawa Unguwa Samanja; Kanfani A. Kofar Gidan Dan Alhaji; Kamfanbi K/G. Sale; Unguwar Ali Kofar Gidan Village Head; Kanon Haki Kofar Gidan Mai Unguwa; Tudun Malamai Yar Yara; Kwankiro Village Head Yard; Ung. A. Tanko Pri. School; Hayin Gada Kofar Gidan Alh. Bala
Faskari	Tafoki	Tafoki Gabas Kofar Gidan Maigari; Ung. Usman Dogo Kofar Gidan Usman Dogo; Karya Kada Kofar Gidan Makera; Shadawa Kofar Gidan Namadi; Doma A. Kofar Gidan Usman Dogo; Doma A2 Kofar Gidan Malam Ladan; Doma B Kofar Gidan Maiunguwa; Ung. Miko Kofar Gidan Alh. Yaye; Sarkin Fulani Muciya; Tafoki Yamma At Dispensary; Yardabaro At Gidan Gona I; Yardabaro At Gidan Gona II
Faskari	Ruwan Godiya	Ruwan Godiya T. V Centre; Ruwan Godiya Kofar Gidan Maigari; Ruwan Godiya Kofar Gidan Bakano; Kafin Nura Kofar Gidan Ado Bagobiri; Sheme Kwakware A, Kofar Gidan Alh. Garba; Sheme Kwakware B Kofar Gidan Alh. Nababa; Ung. Kadiri Kofar Gidan Filani Kadiri; Shawu Kofar G. Nayawuri; Yantuwaru Kofar Gidan Zakka; Kayi Kofar Gidan Mai Ung Kayi; Luggel Kofar Gidan Ali Luggel; Ung. Haji Kofar Gidan Haji; Danbau A, At Pri. School; Danbau B Kofar Gidan G/Kare; Kwai A Pri. School; Kwai B. Kofar Gidan Dalha; R/Santa Kofar Gidan Mai Unguwa; Ung. Goga Kofar Gidan Mai Unguwa; Z/Kwari Kofar Gidan Mai Unguwa Musa; Kani Kawa Kofar Gidan Sarkin Haya; Zarin Tudu Kofar Gidan Wakili
Faskari	Yarmalamai	Maisabo Kofar Gidan Mai Unguwa; Maisabo Kofar Gidan Yabba; Danaji Kofar Gidan Mai Unguwa; Tsaunin Zaki Kofar Gidan Tanko M; Yar Malamai Bedin Moda; Yar Malamai Gan Garen Kwakware; S/Layin Yar Malamai Kofar Gidan Sale; Bakarya Kofar Gidan Mai Unguwa; Bakarya Kofar Gidan Na Tsohuwa; Hamfudi Kofar Gidan Mai Unguwa; Mununu Kofar Gidan Mai Unguwa Abdu; Mununu Kofar Gidan Abdul Karim Soja; Remanya Kofar Gidan Haruna; Marafa Kofar Gidan Maiunguwa Musa; Marafa/Remanya Kofar Gidan Abba Bala; Tsaunin Zaki Kuka Shida Kofar Gidan Abdu; Dan Aji B, Kofar Gidan Musa
Faskari	Faskari	Ung. Vertinary Gidin Dorowa; Ung. Yamma Old T. V B/Office Sarki; Ung Namaska Kofa Gidan Mai Unguwa; Women Centre At Women Centre; Pri. School At Pri. School; Adult Education Gidin Bedi/Police Station; Adult Education Asibitin M. Bature; Nasarawa Kofar Giddan Mai Unguwa; Zamfara Kofar Gidan Mai Unguwa; Ung. Gwanki Kofar Gidan Mai Unguwa; Ung. Dorowa Kofar Gidan Mai Unguwa; Ung. Cinjim Kofar Gidan Mai Unguwa; Kogon Kura Kofar Gidan Mai Unguwa; Post Office Gidin Durmi; Post Office Kofar Gidan Mai Shinkafa; Ung. Maigiya (Grbss) G. R. B. S. S. Faskari; Nadada Ung. Ganye Kofar Gidan Mai Gari; Bilbis S/Gari Kofar Gidan Mai Gari; Biliibis S/Gari Kofar Mai Unguwa; Ung. Kai Gayya Kg. Mai Unguwa; Ung. Gago Kofar Gidan Mai Unguwa; Bilibis Gidan Dan Geru Kofar Gidan Geru; Ung. Bika I Kofar Gidan Mai Unguwa; Ung. Bika II Kofar Gidan Mai Unguwa; Shuwaki Kofar Gidan Mai Unguwa; Yanfa Kofar Gidan Mai Unguwa; Dogon Awo Kofan Gidan Mai Unguwa; Faskari Works Kofar Gidan Alh. Nasiru Sanda
Faskari	Sabonlayi/Galadima	Waka Ta, Ba Bakin Kasuwa; Kankaru Kofar Gidan Mai Unguwa; Shaka Dure Kofar Gidan Galadima; Shaka Dure Kofar Gidan Mai Unguwa; Shaka Dure Pri. School; Mun Haye Kk. Mai Unguwa Tsuru; Mun Haye Kofar Gidan Mai Unguwa; Ung Sakkai Kofar Gidan Mai Unguwa; Bakin Gulbi Gidin Mangwaro Makera; Fankama Kofar Gidan Mai Unguwa; Fankama Pri. School; Akwanta Kofar Gidan Mai Unguwa; Ruwan Dukiya Kofar Gidan Maiunguwa; Ung. Tsamiya Pri. School; Birin Kogo Kofar Gidan Mai Unguwa; Ung. Kaafi Kofar Gidan Maiunguwa; Raba Kofar Gidan Mai Unguwa; Nakayi Kofar Gidan Mai Unguwa; Gobirawa Hospital; Nakayi (Kagana) Bakin Tasha Kagana; Wakataba (Doroyi) Nomadic Pri. School
Faskari	Maigora	Maigora Gabas K/G. Wakili; Maigora Kudu Pri. School; Clinic Maigora At Clinic; Maigora Pri. School Kofar Gidan Sarkin Pawa; Maigora Arewa Kofar Gidan Maigari; Kukar Muta Kofar Gidan Mai Unguwa; Mai Daura Kofar Gidan Maiunguwa; Ung. Gizo Kofar Gidan Malam Inusa; Kadisau Pri. School At Pri. School; Kadisau Arewa Baki Kasuwa; Diyam Kofar Gidan Sani; Sarkin Dutse At Pri. Shool; Gaude Kofar Gidan Ayuba; Ung Gaude C, Kofar Gidan Alh. Sani; Ung. Dan Tagama Kofar Gidan Sarkin Noma; Kyabir Shawa Kofar Gidan Mai Unguwa; Kyabushawa Bello At Pri. School; Jarkuka Kofar Gidan Alh. Maman; Dogon Dawa Kofar Gidan Mai Unguwa; Ug. Alh. Garba Kofar Gidan Alh. Usuman; Ung. Alh. Babba / Kofar Gidan Alh. Baba; Kyabur Shawar Nayalwa Atpri. School
Funtua	Dandutse	Ung. Dan Dutse Shehu Pr. School I; Ung. Dan-Dutse Shehu Pri. Schoolii; Ung. Dan-Dutse Tsohuwar Kasuwa; Ung. Dan-Dutse K/G Dan. Ammani; Ung. Dan-Dutse K/G Dan-Tsohuwa; Ung. Dan-Dutse K/G Dayyabu Bakanike; Ung. Dan-Dutse K/G Magajin Gari I; Ung. Dan-Dutse K/G. Magajin Gari II; Ung. Dan-Dutse K/G Mai Gari Zaria I; Ung. Dan-Dutse K/G Mai Gari Zaria II; Ung. Dan-Dutse K/G Lasisi; Ung. Dan-Dutse K/G. Musa Jakada; Ung. Dan-Dutse K/G Umaru Kafinta; Ung. Dan-Dutse K/G Abu Jika; Locost Houses Lowcost; Ung. Dandutse K/G Samaila Maifata; Ung. Dandutse / Shehu Primary School; Ung. Dandutse / K/G Dantsohuwa II
Funtua	Unguwar Rabiu	Nasarawa K/G Sarkin-Katsina; Ung. Rabiu Aya Pri School; Ung. Rabiu Gidan Fata; Ung. Rabiu K/G. Bala Maikaka; Ung. Rabiu K/G Maikaka; Ung. Rabiu K/G Alaliya; Ung. Rabiu K/G Badamasi M/Taya; Ung. Rabiu K/G Ibrahim M/Magani; Ung. Rabiu K/G Dan-Haire; Ung. Rabiu K/G Tijani Ali; Ung. Rabiu K/G Umaru Shagalli; Ung. Rabiu K/G Hamza Wazami; Ung. Rabiu K/G Maiunguwarabiu; Ung. Rabiu K/G Abba Mai-Bread; Ung. Rabiu K/G Abdn; Ung. Rabiu K/G Gambo Tela; Ung. Tukur Bakin Cinema; Ung Tukur K/G Nayaya M/Doki; Ung. Tukur K/G Umaru Yaro; Ung. Tukur K/G Bala Abdullahi; Ung. Tukur Shagon Rabe M/Yadi; Ung Tukur K/G Mamman Babar Bare; Ung. Tukur K/G Nabature; Ung. Tukur K/G Dan-Iya Tela; Ung. Tukur Sule Mai Kerosine; Ung. Tukur K/G Yaro Mai-Buhu; Ung. Rabiu /Aya Primary School II
Funtua	Ung Ibrahim	Ung Ibrahim Idris Pri. School I; Ung. Ibrahim Pri. School II; Ung Ibrahim Gudindi Pri. School I; Ung. Ibrahim Gudindi Pri. School II; Ung. Ibrahim Filin Kwallo I; Ung Ibrahim Filin Kwallo II; Ung. Ibrahim K/G Alh. Hudu I; Ung. Ibrahim K/G Alh. Hudu II; Ung. Ibrahim K/G Alh. Musa I; Ung. Ibrahim K/G Alh. Musa II; Ung. Ibrahim K/G Mai Unguwa Ibrahim; Ung. Ibrahim K/G Ibrahim M/Shinkafa; Ung. Ibrahim K/G Garba Matsai; Ung. Ibrahim K/G Alh. Tukur; Ung. Ibrahim K/G Lawal Tasha; Ung. Ibrahim Adamu Dillali; Ung. Ibrahim K/G Lawal Gangariya; Ung Ibrahim K/G M/Adashe; Ung Ibrahim K/G Ladidi M/Asibiti
Funtua	Unguwar Musa	Ung. Musa K/G Ladan; Ung. Musa K/G Mani Mai-Mai; Ung, Musa Reading Room; Ung. Musa K/G Alh. Alasan; Ung. Musa K/G Nasaran-Nama; Ung. Musa K/G Abdul-Razaq; Ung. Musa K/G Alhaji Garba; Ung. Musa K/G Bello Mukadar; Ung, Musa K/G Mai-Unguwar; Ung-Musa Social Welfare; Ung. Musa Kurya (Gindin Dutse); Ung. Musa Dan-Rumfa Pri. School; Ung. Musa K/G Da'U Dabo; Ung. Hassan Karofi Pri. School; Ung. Hassan K/G Alh. Haruna; Ung. Hassan K/G Wakilin-Biya; Ung Hassan K/G Alh. Adamu; Ung. Hassan K/G Alh Haruna; Ung. Hassan K/G Alh. Mamman Amadu; Ungu. Hassan K/G Gidin Makera
Funtua	Dukke	Dukke Pri. School; Dukke Bakin Masarllacin Juma'a; Sabon Garin Dukke Sabon Garin Dukke; Ung. Bala Ma, Aji Ung. Bala Ma'aji; Rafin Dunya-Rafin Dunya; Rafin Dunya Hayin Barkono; Zamfarawa Zamfarawa; Ung. Hamida Ung-Hamida; Gwaigwaye Pri. School; Gwaigwaye Ung. Inji; Ung. Adama Tanko Ung Adamu Tanko; Ung. Chi, Bauna K/G Mai Unguwa; Kufan Mai Tsamiya Kufan Maitsamiya; Ung. Sha, E K/G Mai Unguwa; Ung. Sha, E Ung. Sallah; Ung. Biri K/G Mai. Ung
Funtua	Goya	Kwangwai K/G Halliru; Kwangwai K/G Mai Ung.; Harande Pri. School; Makwalla K/G Mai Ung; Shirwaje Dispensary; Madawaki K/Shehu Toro; Ung. Atta K/G Bango; Goya Pri. School; Goya K/G Alhaji Idi; Ung. Mai Mangwa K/G Mai Unguwa; Galadima K/G Alh. Ibrahim; Rafin Kanya K/G Mai Unguwa; Danlayi K/G Mai Unguwa I; Danlayi K/G M/Unguwa II; Ung. Alh. Gambo K/G Alh. Gambo
Funtua	Mai Gamji	Maigamji Pri. School; Maigamji Dispensary; Maigamji Islamiya; Ung. Yawa K/G Maiunguwa; Bakin Dutse K/G Maiunguwa; Jabiri Pri. School; Jabiri K/G Maiunguwa; Jabiri Dispensry; Zamfarawar Sa'adu K/G Mai Unguwar; Gwauruwa - Gwauruwa; Yartafki K/G Hajiya Asma'U; Kwantagiri Gidan Kanawa; Dankawo K/G Malam Tanko; Ung. Wanzamai K/G Ali Shandu; Ung. Wanzamai Gidin Tsamiya; Dogon Awo Gidan Mangwaro; Maijibga K/G Mai Unguwa
Funtua	Maska	Dikko Reading Room; Dikko K/G Mamuda Gwanda; Dikko K/G Liman; Dikko K/G Nagadanya; Kofar Dudu K/G. Alin Maja; Kofar Kudu K/G Sarkin Ruwa; Kofar Yamma K/G Alh. Idi I; Kofar Yamma K/G Alh. Idi II; Loko K/G Shehu Mai Nadi; Kalu K/G Mal. Hudu; Kalu K/G Mahara; Nasarawa Nasarawa Doka; Ung. Yahaya K/G Mai Unguwa; Ung. Tofa Ung. Tofa; Ung. Tofa Hayin Sallau; Dantudu K/G Mai Unguwa; Dantudu K/G Alh. Garba; Dantudu K/G Maiungu; Lasanawa Pri. School
Funtua	Tudun Iya	Tudun Iya Pri. School I; Tudun Iya Pri. School II; Tudun Iya K/G Madawaki; Tudun Iya Madawaki; Tudun Iya Islamiya; Sharaha K/G Maiunguwa; Asharaha Kauyan Mailaya; Asharaha Burma; Tudun Maje K/G Mai Unguwa; Dandada K/G Maiunguwa; Batarawa; Gongori K/G Maiunguwa; Kurku K/G Maiunguwa; Bagire K/G Maiuguwa; Bagire Ung Makera; Hayin Shango K/G Mai Unguwa
Ingawa	Dugul	Dugul - Dugul Kari; Shamiya - Shamiya Pri. School; Doddoji - Doddoji Gari; Ajikawa - Inuwar Kuka; Dukuma - T. V Vieiwing Centre; Bayawa - Gindin Mangoro; Tsamcini - Tsamcini Pri. School; Udawa - Udawa Gari; Wangarawa - Wangarawa; Yere - Yere Gari; Badole Gindin Kanya; Dukuma - T. V Viewing Centre
Ingawa	Yandoma	Yandoma D/Dikore Yandoma; Wangari - Wangari; Kawanya Gindin Dorawa; Zango - Gindin Chediya; Wakai - Wakai Pri. School; Shaiskawa - Yandoma Model Op. S; Malamawa - Malamawa; Sabon Gari - Sabon Gari; Gewai - Gewai; Gagam S/Baka - Gagam S/Baka; Zangon Mata - Zango Mata; Gagam - Gagam; Jassamawa - Wakai Pri. School; Kuriga Kawari Kuriga; Gewai - Gindin Bedi; Kawanya Gindin Mangoro; Sha'Iskawa; Yandoma - D/Kore Yandoma
Ingawa	Ingawa	Galadimawa - Bakin Nub Bank; Galadimawa K/G A. H. Kekkedai; Sabon Gari - Ingawa Model P. S.; Zorori - Adult Ed. Office; Sabon Gari T. V Viewing Centre; Sabon Gari - Social Welfare; Yakurutu - Yakurutu; Dagaya - Reading Room; Dagaya - Magama; Koda - Koda Pri. School; Yanwari - Bujawa; Galadimawa - Dakin Shawara; Danwari - Kwakwaren Danwari; Kofar Gabas K/G Hajiya Akka; Dagaya - 016; Zozori 0-17; Sabon Gari - S/G. Sama'Ila; Sabon Gari K/G Usman Danlami; Zorori - Zorori Pri. School
Ingawa	Agayawa	Agayawa - Matallawa P. S; Maje - Majen Mahauta; Tsakani - Tsakani Gari; Matallawa - Matallawa P. S; Keba - Keba Gari; Dubbai - Dubbai Gari; Yanlami - Yanlami; Jigawa - Jigawa Gari; Kayarda Kukar Shanu; Kayarda B
Ingawa	Jobe/Kandawa	Jobe - Jobe Pri. School; Tsauwa - Tsauwa P. S; Kaku - Kaku Gari; Yartsari - Yartsari P. S; Walawal - Walawal; Kandawa; Ganjuwa - Ganjuwa P. S; Sankarawa - S/D/Manga P. S; Ahawa - Ahawa Gari; Sankarawar Goje Zango P. S; Kundu Waje Nasarawa P. S
Ingawa	Kurfeji/Yankaura	Kurfeji - Kurfeji P. S; Jamfare - Jamfare Gari; Tukuku Durumi - Tukuku Durumi; Damtsi - Damtsi P. S; Dagwalo - Dagwalo P. S; Dundu - Dundu P. S; Tukuku - S/Nakayallu P. S; Yankaura K/G Maigaji; Yarmushe Yar Mushe P. S; Basankare - K/G Maiungwa; Tabanni - K/G Maiunguwa; Amalawa Amalawa P. S; Yarboka - Yanboka P. S; Zanguna K/G Maiunguwa; S/Gm. Audu S/G/ M Audu; Yallawal K/G Maiunguwa; Korfeji Kurfeji P. S
Ingawa	Manomawa/Kafi	Manomawa Manomawa Gari; Marina Tsakiyar Gari; Bakwayal - Bakwayal Gari; Wulliya - Wulliya; Yandorawa - Yandorawa; Kafin Duku - K/Duku Gari; Garawa - Garawa; Gidan Shae - Gidan Shae; Adamawa Adamawa; Manomawa Gari
Ingawa	Bidore/Yaya	Bidore - Bidore P. S; Baure - Baure Gari; Huruwa - Huruwa P. S; Ganga - Ganga; Tsamiya - Tsamiya P. S; Yaya Dispensary; Jamaa - Jamaa P. S; Santar Kwadai - Santar Kwadai; Hotorau - Hotorau; Yaya T. V Viewing Centre
Ingawa	Bareruwa/Ruruma	Bareruwa Gari - Bareruwa - Mangwaro; Garjas - Garjas Tsamiya; Kura - Kura P. S; Garbawar Mai Biri Dandali; Girin Gai Girin Gai Store; Dan Ashitan - Dan-Ashitan - Primary School; Jamaar Tajo - Yara; Dagarawa - Dagarawa; Ruruma Gawo - Ruruma Gawo; Shababen Gawo - Kurna; Ladan - Ladan Pry. Sch.; Damkawa - Damkawa
Ingawa	Daunaka/B. Kwari	Karkarku; Karkarku Tuge - Karkarku Gari; Bargumawa - Danali; Jigawa - Gindin Bedi; Marke Gindin Kuka; Kuki - Zucci B, P. S; Bakin Kwari - Bakin Kwari; Daunaka Pri. School; Sagartau - Sagartau P. S; Yangoto Gindin Kamya; Baujen Filani - Baujen Filani P. S; Kandare; Tunas - Tunas P. S; Yardaunaka K/G Amiunguwar; Tunas - Tunas Pri. School; Zucci Rijiya - Zucci A, P. S
Ingawa	Dara	Dara - Dara P. S; Gunki - Gunki P. S; Saudawa- Saudawa P. S; Wailawa Taugudde Kusa Da Famfo; Kuriga Makera - Gindin Faru; Runji Gindin Bedi
Jibia	Farfaru	Farfaru I Pri. School; Farfaru II Pri. School; Farfaru III Open Space; Unguwar Ruga Farfaru; Garin Jita I Open Space; Zandam I Zandam Pri. School; Zandam/Ung/Ung. Liman II Zandam Pri. School; Hamau Open Space; Kadoji Open Space; Dogon Dutse Opens Space; Mazanya I Open Space; Mazanya II Open Space; Garin Jita II Open Space
Jibia	Yangaiya	Kukar Babangida Dispensary; Yangaiya Yangaiya Pri. School; Jarkuka Pri. School Jarkuka; Sansere Open Space; Dutsen Kura Dutsin Kuka Pri. School; Bihayyu - Open Space; Taka Tsaba Open Space; Daddarar Liman Open Space; Garin Wodi Open Space; Matso Matso - Matso Matso Pri. School; Garin Gabas - Open Space
Jibia	Jibia A	Jibiya Central I Pri. School; Jibiya Central I Open Space/Gari; Jibiya Central II Open Space/Gari; Sabon Gari Open Space; Sabon Gari Open Space S/Gari; Sabon Gari I Open Space; Sabon Gari II Open Space; Sabon Gari III Open Space; Sabon Gari IV Open Space; Sabon Gari V Open Space; Sabon Gari K/Gidan Lola Maituwo; Tudun Wada Clinic I K/Gidan Lola Maituwo; Tudun Wada Pri School III T/Wada Pri. School; Mangwarori/T/Wada IV Open Space; Mangwarori/S. Gari - Open Space; Gidan Dangoje, S/Gari-Open Space; G. G. Gs. S. Jibia - G. G. S. S. Assembly Hall; Danmarke G. D. S. S. Jibya
Jibia	Jibia B	Tashar Godi/Dantudu/Open Space T/Gode; Filin Sardo/Dantudu/Filin Sardo; Kuka I/District Head Office; Kuka II/Oplen Space; Dantudu/Open Space; Filin Sale Open Space Filin Sale; Ung. Liman Shehu I Open Space Ung. Liman; Garin Sama/Open Space; Jibia Babba I /Pri School; Jibia Babba II /Jibia Pri. School; Sabaru/Open Space; Tudun-Tukare/Open Space Karna; Ung. Liman Shehu II /Open Space; Kuka III/Open Space Dakali; Kuka/Districit Head Office; Jibia Babba/Jibia Pri. School; Ung. Liman Shehu III / Open Space
Jibia	Mazanya/Magama	Magama Kaga Hassan Open Space; Kaga Karama Open Space; Magama/Magaji/Ung Liman Pri. School; Matsiga / Koki Open Space At Hassan B. B. C House; Kwararan Fulani Open Space; Mazanya Saadu Open Space; Dan'Arau Pri. School; Sabon Gari Magama Open Space; Kagadama Open Space; Shaiskawa/Inwala Magama Pri. School; Dan-Tambara Open Space; Danmasani Open Space; Mazanya I Fulani Open Space; Ung. Nasarawa Open Space; Kwararen Tukwane Open Space; Mazanya II Open Space B/Yara; Magama/Kaga Hassan Open Space; Magama/Magaji/Ung. Liman Pri. School; Matsiga/Koki II Open Space; Shaiskama/Inwala Magama Pri. School; Ung Nasarawa Open Space
Jibia	G/Baure/Mallamawa	Gurbin Baure I Baure Pri. School; Gurbin Baure II Baure Pri. School; Garin Mai Wuya Open Space; Tsamben Kalnbo Pri. School; Tsamben Radi Pri. School Radi; Tsamben Bakkwai Open Space; Fafara/S. Tasha/Ung. Liman Open Space; Tsayau Open Space; Shimfida I Open Space; Tagwaye Open Space; Fafara Open Space; Tsauni Open Space; Dantudu - Dantudu Pri. School; Shinfida II Open Space
Jibia	Faru	Faru/Gurbin M. Fulani Faru Pri. School; Jibya Maje Open Space; Makada Open Space/Gidan M. Gari; Sabon Garin Mallamawa Open Space G/Rijiya; Shabba K/Gidan M. Unguwa; Gurbin Magarya I Open Space; Garin Dan / Indo Pri. School; Malamai/Garin M Ibrahim Open Space; Farfarun Malamai/Makiyawa Pri. School; Maigarke Open Space; Lankwasau - Open Space; Garin-Gado/Ung. Nasarawa Open Space; Mai Kwari Open Space; Gurbin Margaya II Pri School; Faru T. V Viewing Centre
Jibia	Bugaje	Bugaje Open Space; Bugaje Gari/S/Gari - Bugaje Pri. School; Tsaunin Kuka Open Space; Nasarawa I Open Space; Dan-Garin Dawa - K/G Mai Ung.; Yada Kore - Open Space; Kaura - Kaura Pri. School; Kauge Open Space; Kafiyal - Open Space; Yan Gero - Open Space; Nasarawa II - Open Space; Gakurdi 1 - Gakurdi Pri. School; Murtuku/Walawa - Open Space; Murtuku - Murtuku Pri. School; Gakurdi II - Gakurdi Pri. School
Jibia	Riko	Riko Gabas I T. V Viewng Centre; Riko Yamma Riko Pri. School; Ginzo - Ginzo Pro. School; Danchafa Gari Open Space; Daga Ung Sadau Pri. School; Daga Gari Pri. School; Danchafa Ung. Gabas Open Space; Dogon - Dawa Kwari-Open Space; Saye/Agan Garo Pri. School; Dogon Dawa Tagamji Pri. School; Saye/G/Lafiya Open Space; Daga Yamma / Open Space; Daga / Daga Pei. School
Jibia	Kusa	Kusa I/Open Space; Kusa II/Pri. School; Chas Chas /Open Space; Farun Bala/Open Space; Farun Bala II/Chediya; Sabon Gari/Open Space; Kadobe/Pri. School; Ung. Dadara/K. G Galadima; Natsinta/K/Shata; Daddara Iipri. School; Rimi/Pri. School; Zambadawa/Open Space; Jangero /S/ Mantau - Open Space; Rafin Kanya-Kanya Open Space; Ung. Dandawana/Open Space
Kafur	Yartalata/Rigoji	Rigoji I Pri. School; Rigoji II Kofar Fada; Rigoji II Leprosy Centre; Kolawa Open Space; Ungwar Kabiru Kofar Gidan Maiunguwa; Dutsen Yanki I Kofar Gidan Maiunguwa; Dutsen Yanki II Pri. School; Bugawa I Pri. School; Bugawa II P. S; Unguwar Miko Open Space; Unguwar Dawa Open Space; Unguwar Kartakai Pri. School; Kurmi I & II Pri. School; Kurmi III Kofar Gidan Maiunguwa; Santar Arab Kofar; Zango Kofar Gidan Maiunguwa; Dayawa I Pri. School; Dayawa II Kofar Gidan Maiunguwa; Yartalata I Pri. School; Yartalata II Kofar Fada; Yartalata III Kofar Gidan Mai Unguwa
Kafur	Dutsin Kura/Kanya	Dutsen Kura I Pri. School; Dutsenkura II Kofar Fada; Dutsen Kura III G. D. S. S; Unguwar Bawa; Kabalawa Kofar Gidan Maiunguwa; Unguwar Sadau Kofar Gidan Maiunguwa; Zaure Open Space; Unguwar Bawa Bawa Open Space; Unguwar Madawaki Dandali; Unguwar Tsamiya Adult Educ. Class; Kanya I Pri. School; Kanya Fako II Open Space; Ehohi - Ehohi; Unguwar Diyami Open Space; Marabar Kanya Pri. School; Dutsen Kura IV Kofar Fada
Kafur	Masari	Masari I Adult Educ. Class; Masari II Adult Educ. Class; Masari III Pri School; Kuraku Pri. School; Fammaraya Pri. School; Gidan Banje Open Space; Unguwar Iliya Open Space; Unguwar Bala Pri. School; Unguwar Samai Pri. School; Layin Makera Kofar Gidan Maiunguwa; Gada Gada Pri. School; Bagudu Open Space; Unguwar Kyallo Kofar Gidan Maiunguwa; Rura Kofar Gidan Maiunguwa
Kafur	Yari Bori	Yari Bori I Pri School; Yari Bori II Dispensary; Yari Bori III Adult Educ. Office; Kufan Tambo I Pri. School; Kufan Tambo II Kofar Gidan Ma'Iunguwa; Kurin Gafa I Kofar Gabas; Kurin Gafa II Pri. School; Kurin Gafa II Gangarawa; Unguwar Gariya Kofar Gidan Maiunguwa; Tafakin Jange Layin Ya'U; Tafkin Jange Gidan Kado; Jange I Open Space; Jange II Kofar Gidan Maiunguwa; Gidan Kaho Open Space; Tsaunin Tama Gidan Ibrahim Mage; Kurin Gafa IV Pri. School
Kafur	Sabuwar Kasa	Sabuwar Kasa I Pri. School; Sabuwar Kasa II Kofar Fada; Sabuwar Kasa III Pri. School; Unguwar Mairiga I Pri. School; Unguwar Mairiga II Rafin - Iya; Unguwar Riga Rafin - Iyaka; Unguwar Bala I Kofar Gidan Mai'Nnguwa; Unguwar Bala II Pri. School; Unguwar Waziri Kofar Gidan Waziri'; Unguwar Sheka Open Space; Babbar Gona Babbar Gona
Kafur	Dantutture	Dantutture Kofar Gidan Maiunguwa; Daren Fada I Kofar Gidan Maiunguwa; Daren Fada II Open Space; Unguwar Jange I Kofar Gidan Maiunguwa; Unguwar Jange II Open Space; Unguwar Jange III Pry. School; Malamawa I Pri. School; Mallamawa II Kofar Gidan Maiunguwa; Jargaba I Pri. School; Jargaba II Nasarawa; Rafin Sako Kofar Gidan Maiunguwa; Unguwar Jalle Kofar Gidan Maiunguwa; Durmai I Kofar Gidan Maiunguwa; Durmai II Gigo; Takawa Dandali; Dankanjiba I Pri. School; Dankanjiba II Kofar Fada; Dankanjiba III Near Maiunguwa House; Dankanjiba IV Middle Of The Town; Dankanjiba V South Of The Market; Dankanjiba VI Dispensary; Malamawa III Kofar Gidan Maiunguwa
Kafur	Mahuta	Mahuta I Pri. School; Mahuta II Kofar Gabas; Mahuta III Unguwar Lungu; Mahuta IV Unguwar Mohammed; Mahuta V Kofar Kudu; Mahuta VI Unguwa Bari; Kewayen Gari Open Space; Suran I Pri. School; Suran II Near Maiunguwa House; Dankwaro Near Maiiunguwa House; Ung Barkono Unguwar Barkono; Ung. Dan Gwauro I Pri. School; Unguwar Dan Gwauro II P. S; Rawaiya Kofar Gidan Maiunguwa; Nasarawa K/G Maiunguwa; Ung-Kyambo Near Maiunguwa House; Bari Near Maiunguwa House; Kagara I Pri. School; Kagara II Open Space; Gigo/Jandumawa Asibiti; Kagara III Asibiti
Kafur	Gamzago	Badawa Pri. School; Gamzago I Pri. School; Gamzago II Dandalin Wasa; Gamzago III Kuresawa; Unguwar Gari Open Space; Kantarawa Kofar Gidan Mainguwa; Bagari I Pri. School; Bagari II South End; Butawa Kofar Gidan Maiunguwa; Yan-Tsamiya Open Space; Ung. Barde Near Maiunguwa House; Yar-Chediya Near Maiunguwa House; Yar-Kanya Near Maiunguwa House; Malamawa I Pri. School; Malamawa II Adult Edu. Class; Malamawa III Kofar Gidan; Kadandani Pri. School; Baraka I Primary School; Ung. Kwari Unguwa Kwari; Zamfarawa Kofar Gidan Maiunguwa
Kaita	Yandaki	Yandaki Fande - T. V Centre; Yandaki Pri. School Yandaki; Kwagwai/T. Kada - Kadafawa; Waila At Yara; Tsamiya/Lomi Isah; Kwarin Majema - Barza; Loki Dabatsu - K. Gidan M/Ung; Dutsin Safe/Gundufa - Pri. School; Rafin Baro/Chiromo - Tashar Gira; Walawa/Tofa - Walawa Tofa
Kaita	Dankaba	Dawan Allah - K/Gidan Mai Gari; Sawarya Gari - Sawarya Pri. School; Sawarya Dono - Gidan Bala; Dan Tsara - Dantsara; Dono Gari - Dono Pri. School; Waiwaya - Cikin Gari Yara; Tiki/Kirda - Tiki; Moda Gari - Moda Pri. School; Kandandani K/Gidan Mai Unguwa; Dankaba Gari - Dankaba Pri. School; Tabkin Baure - Yara T/Baure; Fulfaren Sule - Yara Fulani; Fulfaren Umme Mai Unguwa; Jawurde - K/G Mai Ung
Kaita	Abdallawa	Abdallawa 'A' - T. V Centre Abdallawa; Abdallawa 'B' Pri. School; Abdallawa 'C' Pri. School; Nanjogel - Near Gidan Galadima; Kuka - Kuka Fage; Lafiyaru 'A' - Lafiyaru Pri. School; Lafiyaru 'B' Lafiyaru Pri. School; Danbazau - Danbazau Pri. School; Jifatu - Jifatu Pri. School; Fataye - Near Gidan Abashe
Kaita	Baawa	Ba'awa - Ba'awa Dispensary; Dagoni Near Gidan Mai Ung; Dan Kunama - T. V Centre Dan Kunama; Bamle Dutsi - Bamle Pri. School; Tsamiya - Near Gidal L. Hamza; Sabon Birni - Near Gidan Bala
Kaita	Gafiya	Gafiya Gari - T. V Centre; Gafiya Karkara - Dispensary Gafiy; Birji Gari Tsamiyar Mai Dame; Bado Gari - Bado Pri School; Gwarai Gari Near M/Ung. House; Zabakau - Zabakau Pri. School; Shotel - Kofar Gidan Mai Unguwa; Madafa - Near M/Ung. House; Yar Talata - Fage Yartalata
Kaita	Girka	Girka 'A' T. V. Centre; Girka 'B' - Girka Pri. School; Garu - Garu Pri. School; Masaki/Tarkama - Masaki Pri. School; Makauraci - Makauraci Pri. School; Kwangwami - K/Gidan Mai Ung; Ung. Jibo - Ung Jibo Pri. School; Gadari - Near Gidan Mai Unguwa; Ung. Tsamiya - Ung Tsamiya Pri. School; Jankerma - K/Gidan Mai Ung.; Dangamji - K/Gidan Mai Ung
Kaita	Kaita	Kaita A - T. V Centre; Kaita 'B' - Works Dept.; Kaita C - Kaita Pri. Cschool; Kaita D - Kaita Pri. School; Kaita E Ung. Makera Kaita; Kaita F - K/Gidan Alh. Kado; Gande Gari 'A' - K/Gidan Mai Ung; Gande Gari 'B' Pri. School; Gande Fulani - At Yara; Dabawa Gari - K/Gidan Mai Ung; Girmawa - Near Gidan Alh. Bala; Daba 'A - Daba Pri. School; Daba Gari 'B' - K/Gidan Mai Ung; Kwanar Shagari - K/Gidan Mai. Lawal; Doroyi - At Fage Doroyi; Tsaunin Auta - Kofar Gidan Auta; Modibawa 'A' - K/Gidan Mai Ung; Modibawa 'B' - Modibawa Pri. School; Modibawa 'C' At Badole; Kokaya / Waila - At Near Koya; Kaita'G' - Works Dept.
Kaita	Yanhoho	Yanhoho 'A' - K/Gidan Mai Ung; Yanhoho 'B' - Pri. School; Kafin Mashi - K/Mashi Pri. School; Modibawa - Modibawa Pri. School; Ung. Malamai K/Gidan Lima; Waila - Near Gidan Bunu Dogo; Allemi Gari - Allemi Pri. School; Kwaryawa - At Yara Kwaryawa; Nahuta Rijiya Yara Nahuta; Sabi Gari - Sabi Pri. School
Kaita	Dankama	Dankama 'A' - Kofar Fada Dankama; Dankama 'B' T. V. Center; Dankama 'C' Dankama Pri. School; Duma - Duma Pri. School; Lugga Gari - At Yara Lugga; Dono/Dantsara - At Yara Dono; Dantudu Gari - Dantufu Pri. School; Zanguna - K/Gidan Magaji; Wanke Tsiya - K/Gidan Mai Ung; Ashallu At Yara Ashallu; Kuntu Gari - Kuntu Pri. School; Inwala - At Yara Pri. School; Gwanga Gari/Fulani-Gwanga Pri. School; Kirda/Shagari - Rijiyar Zankara; Jagaba/Gidan Dare K/Gidan Mai Ung.; Fadama/Babare - At Babare K/G Mai Ung; Dankama 'D' - Kofar Fada Dankama; Dankama 'A' (1) / Kofar Fada T. V. Centre
Kaita	Matsai	Matsai K/Fada - K/Gidan Magaji; Gidan Kano Algaita - T. V. Centre; Ung Ruwa - Matsai Dissipensary; Radi - Radi Pri. School; Kagadama/Gishirawa - Kagadama Pri. School; Kabobi Gari - K/Gidan Mai Unguwa; Kabobi Yamma - Kabobi Pri. School; Bilaskori - Bilaskori Pri. School; Gobirawa - Gidan Gayya; Gangara/Kwarin Tiga - Fagen Faru
Kankara	Gatakawa S/Gari/Mabai	Nagunda - K/G Mai Ung; Mabai I - Pri. School; Mabai II - Kg/Mai Unguwa; Mabai/Islamiya -K/Gidan Maiunguwa; Jaga - K/Gidan Mai Unguwa; Biya -K/Gidan Mai Unguwa; Madobai I - K/Gidan Mai Unguwa; Madobai II - Pri. School; Kafi - K/Gidan Mai Ung; Runji - Kofar Gidan Mai Ung; Kaikabayas -K/G Mai Ung; Ung. Daudu - K/G Mai Ung; Dan Kumeji I Pri. School; Dan Kumeji II K/G Mai Ung; Gajakawa I K/G Mai Ung.; Gatakawa II - Pri. School; Ung. Bako - K/G Mai Ung; Mabai IV - Yar Yara; Dan Nakwabo; Gatakawa (Masgaba); Zurunkutun I - Pri. School; Zurunkutun II - Pri. School
Kankara	Zango/Zabaro	Zango I Pri. School; Zango II Pri. School; Zango K/G Mai Ung III; Makera - K/G Mai Ung; Dansabau I - T. V Viewing Centre; Dansabau II K/G Mai Ung; Danmarke Z. -K/Gidan Mai Ung; Areda I Pri. School; Areda II - K/Gidan Mai Ung; Dakamawa - K/G Dan Mai Ung; Santar Guraje I Pri. School; Santar Guraje II Pri. School; Tanimawa - Pri. School; Kabuke K/G Mai Ung; Santar Nakanti K/G Mai Ung; Saliihawa K/G Mai Ung; Bela - K/Mai Ung; Bakkai - Pri. School; Gidan Damo K/G Mai Ung; Dan Yaroji - K/G Mai Ung; Sherere K/G Mai Ung.
Kankara	Pauwa A&B	Yardorawa - K/G Mai Ung; Katantu - K/G Mai Ung; Mahera - K/G Mai Ung; Yan Geme - Yar Yara Chediya; Majifa Pri. School; Ung Maru - Rimi; Gidan Jefau - Gidan Jefau; Pauwa I Pri. School; Pauwa II - Dissipensary; Katoge I Pri. School; Katoge II Dispensary; Dan Birgima - K/Gidan Mai; Masaku - Pri. School; Kaurawa - K/G Mai Ung; Gurbi I - Ung Yamma; Gurbi II Pri. School; Kokarawa - K/G Mai Ung; Gidan Sarki Bakin Hanya; Ung Dangwamma - K/G Mai Ung; Kwangerawa K/G Mai Ung; Danchiroma K/G Mai Ung
Kankara	Kukasheka	Sabon Layi I A&B Pri. School; Durkaniya - K/G Mai Ung; Gobirawa I Ab Pri School; Gobirawa II K/G Mai Ung; Hurumi I Pri. School; Hurumi II K/G Mai Ung; Ung Dogo - K/G Mai Ung; Kanawa - K/G Mai Ung; Kadanya -K/G Mai Ung; Almaji Rawa - Pri School; Makawa - K/Gidan Maiungwa; Mashigi K/Unguwa; Ung Maigari K/Unguwa; Ung Garba K/Unguwa; Sabon Layi II Pri. School
Kankara	Hurya	Ketare I Pri. School; Ketare II - Model Pri. School; Ung Umar - Leprosy Clinic; Abduwa - Abduwa Clinic; Dandashire I A&B Dansheri; Ung. Sale I Ung Sale; Ung. Sale II Gidan Sharu; Ung Shehu - Ung Shehu; Sagaba Pri. School; Bada'U - Bada'U Pri. School; Hurya East I Hurya Pri. School; Hurya West II Ganzamawa; Hurya III - Gidan Jaki
Kankara	Kankara A&B	Kofar Arewa I Pri School; Kofar Arewa II Lawal Pri. School; Kofar Yamma I Pri. School; Kofar Yamma II K/G M/Ung Matsiga; Kofar Kudu I A&B K/G Mai Ung; Kofar Kudu II A&B -Nuhu Pri. School; Kofar Kudu Vet Clinic I A&B Leprosy Clinic; Kofar Kudu Vet Clinic II A&B Vet Clinic; Kankara Tsakiya 'Adult Edu. Class; Kankara Jobe A&B Reading Room; Islamiyya - Bakin Masallachi; Kankara Central Dissipensary A&B Dispensary; Sabon Gari Project Store A&B S/G Project Store; Fertilzer Store 1 A&B - Feti Store; Kofar Kudu III / Open Space; Fertilizer Store II A&B Nepa/Water Board; Project Office - Project Office; Marabar Gurbi - Islamiyya; Jan Ruwa I Pri. School; Jan Ruwa II Pri. School; Maude I Bagoma Pri. School; Maude II - Maude P. School; Ung. Mai Dawa Ung Mai Dawa; Kankara Kudu Kuyan Gizo; Kankara W/Board - Pampon Mamuda; Kankara S/Gari S/Gari Islamiya M. Yunusa; Kankara Jobe / Reading Room
Kankara	Garagi	Tsamiyar Jino Pri. School; Tsamiyar Jino II Comm. Building; Tsamiya Jino III K/G Mai Ung; Garagi K/G Mai Ung; Santar Amadi - Saantar Amadi; Ung Rabo - Ung Rabo/K/U; Nagamda - Filin Masallachi; Mai Here - Gidan Mai Ung; Sabon Gari K/G Mai Ung; Gobirawa K/G Mai Ung; Batsirari K/G Mai Ung; Zagalle K/G Mai Ung; Ung S. Aiki -K/G Ung; Naganda/Amarawa -K/G Maiung
Kankara	Burdugau	Burdugau I - Pri. School; Burgugau II - Pri. School; Dan Lawal A&B Project; Dorawa I Tashar Dorawa Natiba; Dorawa II -K/G Sani Sarki; Dan Kakuru - K/G Mai Ung; Agangaro - Agangaro; Sharada I K/G Maiung; Sharada II K/G Ag Sallau; Mai Sabulu -K/G Maiung; Dankalgo A&B K/G Maiung; Dan Barmo Pri. School; Santar Kaku Pri. School; Gobirawa K/G Mai Unguwa; Gobirarawa K/Gidan Mai Unguwa; Mai Kawo Pri. School I; Kurba I Pri. School; Kurba II K/G Mai Ung
Kankara	Wawar Kaza	Gundawa I Pri. School; Gundawa II K/G Maiung; Gundawa III Dispensary; Gundawa IV K/G Sarkin Fada; Wawar Kaza I Pri. School; Wawar Kaza II Islamiyya; Tudu Gabas Yara; Tudu Yamma K/G Mal. Zaiyana; Burunkuza - K/G Maiung; Tashar Maje K/G Liman Sa'adu; Bakawa I Bakawa Kwari; Bakawa II Pri. School; Masaurari K/G Maiung; Damawa -K/G Maiung; Hayin Tulu K/G Mal Zaiyana; Ung Tsamiya K/G Mai Ung; Fanteka Fanteka; Gundawa Iib K/Gidan Mai Unguwa; Tudu Yamma B K/G M. Ung
Kankara	Dan Murabu	Dutsen Roko Tasha; Bakawa I Pri. School; Marake A&B K/G Maiung; Bakawa II (Ung Nagodi) Mai Ung; Tsamiyar Sarki Pri. School; Matsiga A&B - K/G Maiung; Dan Marusa Pri. School; Dan Marusa II K/G Maiung; Baure Pri. School; Yarkuka Pri. School; Rimaye I Pri. School; Rimaye II K/G Maiung; Tsamiyar Sarki B Pri School
Kankara	Dan'Maidaki	Gureta - Gidan Mai Unguwa; Kwankwalwa Gidan Mai Unguwa; Sabon Gidan - Gidi Bedi; Danmarke I Pri. School; Dan Marke Iia Dispensary; Dan Marke Iib Dispensary; Dan Marke Iia Tsamiya; Dan Marke (Yalwa) I. V Yalwa; Dan Marke Iib Islamaiya; Katsinawa - Masallachi; Tsaunin Goda Gidan Mai Ung; Gidan Daudu - Gidan Daudu; Yargoje I A Pri. School; Yargoje II Dispensary; Yargoje III - Clinic; Yar Goje IV Kofar Fada; Zinari / Pry. Sch.; Gidan Boka - Gidan Boka; Ruwan Tukurwa I Pri. School; Ruwan Tukurwa II K/G Ranau (Ingi; Ung Tofa K/G Ung Maiung; Ung Kwari - Ung Kwari; Yar Goje II Dispensary
Kankia	Galadima 'A'	Sabon Birni A - Nuhu P. S; Sabon Birni B - Nuhu Pri. School; Kofar Yamma I - Yara Open Space; Kofar Gabas K/G M/Ung; Bakin Kasuwa Pri. School; B/Kasuwa H/Yamma Pri. School; Unguwar Kanawa K/G Ung; Kauyen Dawa K/G M/Ung; K/Yamma II Pri. School; B/Kasuwa H/Yamma II P. School; Ung Kanawa Open Space
Kankia	Galadima 'B'	Kwarago- Kwarago Pri. School; Gandun Kaya - Pri. School; Kanti 'A' Pri. School; Kanti 'B' Works Dept.; Tarno - Kukar Kwaida; Kawari Pri. School; Abugi Jiki K/G M/Ung; Kanti Az Pri. School; Kanti B2 Pri. School; Kanti B Works Dept.
Kankia	Kafinsoli	Sagawar Kurmi - S. K Pri. School; Kafinsoli 1&II - K/Soli Pri. School; Kafinsoli III&IV Dispensary; Gadar Musa Pri. School; Sha'Iskawa Pri. School; Doka - Doka Pri. School; Hayin Alasan K/G Unguwa; Unguwar Gada K/G Unguwa; Sagawar Gumbe K/G Unguwa; Taurarin Dokoki K/G Unguwa; Gadar Musa K/G Unguwar; Kafinsoli V - Dissipensary
Kankia	Tafashiya/Nasarawa	Sabuwar Duniya Pri. School; Jigawa - Jigawa Pri. School; Rugar Miji K/G M/Ung; Nasarawa Nsw Pri. School; Kofar Arewa K/G M/Ung; Kofar Yamma - Open Space; Kofar Gabas - Open Space; Kofar Kudu T. V Centre; Dandau Open Space; Mushallake/Zamfara Pri. School; Shawaji/Butta Pri. School; Shawaji/Butta Open Space; Tafashiya Pri. School; Tafashiya II Pri. School
Kankia	Kunduru/Gyaza	Agala - K/G Nayaya; Bajawa - Open Space; Ung Dogo/Badole Open Space; Unguwar Lemu Open Space; Kunduru 'A' Pri. School; Kunduru 'B' T. V Centre; Gindawai K/G M/Ung; Gidan Jakada K/G/Mung; Jauga Pri. School; Jakiri Pri. School; Salawa Open Space; K/Yamma Gyaza Pri. School; K/Gabas Gyaza - Open Space; Gidan Nadango Open Space; Ung Baki I Open Space; Ung Baki II Open Space
Kankia	Kafin Dangi/Fakuwa	Ruga Allo - K/G M/Unguwa; Dan Nayaki I Pri. School; Dan Nayaki II Open Space; Ung. Dabo - Open Space; Kirkini I - Open Space; Kirkini II - Open Space; Fakuwa - Pri. School; Salihawa I&II Open Space; Makera - Open Space; Kwandawa K/G M/Ung; Yamadi I&II Pri. School; Kofar Fada Pri. School; Fanga Pri. School; Kauyen Maina - K/G M/Ung; Unguwar Kwari K/G M/Ung; Zangon Malabare K/G M/Ung; Yanyaji K/G M/Ung.
Kankia	Sukuntuni	Maidanko I - K/G Galadima; Maidank0 II - K/G M/Unguwa; Ung Sabo K/G M/Unguwa; Hayin Korama - K/G M/Ung; Hayin Kwanta - K/G M/Unguwa; Sukuntuni I Pri. School; Sukuntuni II Open Space; Gidan Guru Pri. School; Tudun Wulli Pri. School; Yankari Open Space; Gemawa Open Space; Walawa Open Space
Kankia	Rimaye	Danbazama Pri. School; Ung Mal. Ali Pri. School; Ung Mal Ali II Dispensary; Ung. Nasarawa I K/G M/Ung; Zakin Baure K/G M/Ung; Gwajawa I - Motor Park; Gwajawa II Open Space; Duza I - Open Space; Duza II - Open Space; K/Dutse - Pri. School; Ung. Auta Rimaye Pri. School; Gemawa K/G M/Ung; Bindinga K/G M/Ung; D/Tsohuwa Youth Centre; Ung. Nasare I Open Space; Ung. Nasare II Open Space; Ung. Nasarwa II Open Space
Kankia	Gachi	Kauyen Tofa K/G M/Ung; Dandoro - Pri. School; Rugar Daudu -Pri. School; Taiba - Taiba Pri. School; Yarlaya Pri. School; Kofar Fada T. V Centre; Ruga Gyaza K/G M/Ung; Ung Tabki I - K/G M/Ung; Gachi Pri. School; Ung. Tabki II - K/G M/Ung; Kofar Fada II - T. V Centre
Kankia	Magam/Tsa	Macinji I&II Pri School; Ung Tsa - K/G M/Ung; Asaurarar Dankaka - K/G M/Ung; Asaurarar Ilu - K/G M/Ung; Fan Farauta Pri. School; Tsa Yamma Pri. School; Tsa Gabas - Dispensary; Tashar Kare K/G M/Unguwa; Tashar Gamji K/G M/Unguwa; Malamawa K/G M/Unguwa; Akuttai Pri. School; Magam Open Space; Tsogawa Open Space; Kartawa Open Space; Dan'Iya Pri. School
Katsina	Wakilin Gabas I	Kofar Bai / Kayalwa Pri. School I; Kofar Bai / Kayalwa Pri. School II; Kofar Bai /Kayalwa Pri. School III; Kofar Bai / Kayalwa Pri. School IV; Kofar Bai / Kayalwa Pri. School V; Kofar - Keke / Nagogo Pri. School; Tudun Wada / Nagogo Pri. School; Kofar Sauri / K/Gidan A. Mairiga; Zanguna Masussukin Zanguna; Modoji / Katsina Club; Modoji - Modoji Pri. Shool; Modoji Pri. School; Modoji / Modoji Pri. School I; Modoji / Modoji Pri. School II; Rafukka / Gidado Pri. School; Rafukka / Gindin Rimi I; Rafukka / Gindin Rimi II; Makera / Filin Yar'Yara I; Makera / Filin Yar'Yara II; Kofar Sauri / K/Gidan Sagir Sule; Kofar Sauri / Kantin Hussaini M/Shayi I; Kofar Sauri / Kantin Hussaini M/Shayi II; Kofar Sauri / K/Gidan Hajiya Yaha Mani I; Kofar Sauri / K/Gidan Hajiya Yaha Mani II; Iyantachi / Nasarawa Pri. School; Tudun Wada / Girls Day Pri. School I; Tudun Wada / Girls Day Pri. School II; Tudun Wada / Bakin Gawo; Filin Samji / Filin Samji Pri. School I; Filin Samji / Filin Samji Pri. School II; Kofar Durbi / K/Gidan Lema; Kofar Durbi / Social Dev. Training Centre
Katsina	Wakilin Gabas II	Kofar Marusa Kofar Marusa Pri. School I; Kofar Marusa Pri. School II; Kofar Marusa Kofar Marusa Pri. School III; Kofar Marusa / Dutsin Amare Pri. School; Kofar Maursa/ Dutsin Amare Pri. School I; Kofar Marusa / Dutsin Amare Pri. School II; Kofar Marusa / K/Gidan A Gwanda; Kofar Marusa / Layin Zana Bayan Tasha; Kofar Marusa K/Gidan A. Yusuf Ladan; Kofar Durbi K/Gidan Dauda Mani; Kofar Durbi K/G Sani Mashi; Kofar Durbi / Bakin Kofar; S/Unguwa K/Durbi - Sabuwar Ung K/Durbi; Yar'Adua Filin Fives I; Yar'Adua Filin Fives II; Yar'Adua K/G Labaran Zaria; Shaiskawa Magama Junction; Kofar Marusa Bakin Kantuna; Kerau Gidan Dan Amar I; Kerau Gidan Dan Amar II; Kofar Durbi K/Gidan Mai Unguwa; D/Amare Bakin Farin Gida; Yar'Adua K/Gidan Bebeji; Shaiskawa K/Gidan Isa Gachi I; Shaiskawa K/Gidan Isa Gachi II; Kiddies International-Kiddies Internati0nal Pri. School
Katsina	Kangiwa	Kofar Soro - Emirs Palace I; Kofar Soro - Emirs Palace II; Kofar Soro - Unguwar Gadi I; Kofar Soro - Unguwar Gadi II; Kofar Soro - K/G Sule Idonda; Kofar Soro - K/G Musa Gadi; Tafkin Lambu / Kofar Soro; Tsamiya / K/G Sarkin Bindiga; Unguwar Kuka / K/G Muntari Cikin Gida; Saulawa / K/G Dan Baiwa I; Saulawa / K/G Dan Baiwa II; Gwangwan / Filin Bayan Rex; Yar'Adua / Bakin Rex Cinema; Yarinchi / K/Gidan Wali I; Yarinchi / K/Gidan Wali II; Yarinchi / K/Gidan Sarkin Tsafta; Yarinchi / K/Gidan Wambai; Kukar Gesa / K/Gidan Mai Unguwa; Tsallatori / K/Gidan Mai Unguwa; Gamji / K/Gidan M. Tanimu; Saulawa / Nagogo Pri. School; Saulawa / K/Gidan Kadarko; Yar'Adua / K/Gidan Talba I; Yar'Adua / K/Gidan Talba II; Yammawa / Filin Bayan K. T. C; Yarinchi / K/Gidan Boyi Mahuta; Kofar - Soro / Kofar Gidan Musa Gadi
Katsina	Wakilin Yamma 1	Makudawa / K/G Mallan Musa I; Makudawa / K/G Mallan Musa II; Makudawa / K/G Alh. Dalha; Makudawa / K/G Mai Unguwa I; Makudawa / K/G Mai Unguwa II; Makudawa / K/G Dan Makudu I; Makudawa / K/G Dan Makudu II; Makudawa / K/G Abban Kanwa; Ung Makada / K/G Balarabe M/Kilishi; Sararin Tsako / Bakin Masallacin Zuri Dandum; Tudun Yanshanu / K/G Sarkin Fawa; Kwanarya / K/G Yusuf Rogo; Chake / K/G Muntari Lawal; Sararin Tsako / K/Gidan Musa Wanzan; Sararin Tsako / K/G Abba Gambo; Sararin Tsako / K/G Ahmed Turawa I; Sararin Tsako / K/G Ahmed Turawa II; Kofar Guga / K/G Isa Likita; Kofar Guga / K/G Alh. Bala Kamfani I; Kofar Guga / K/G Alh. Bala Kamfani II; Sullubawa / K/G Alh. Usman D. Tsadara I; Sullubawa / K/G Alh. Usman D. Tsadara II; Sullubawa / K/G Ayuba Sullubawa; Sallubuwa / K/G Usman Sarki; Yan, Tandu / K/G Galadima Aski; Sabongida / K/G Mai-Unguwa; Lungun Nufawa / Shagon Dan Taro; Chake / K/Gidan A. Muntari Lawal
Katsina	Wakilin Yamma 1i	Gafai - Gafai Pri. School I; Gafai - Gafai Pri. School II; Gafai - Gafai Pri. School III; Gafai - K/Gidan Dahiru Dabai I; Gafai - K/Gidan Dahiru Dabai II; Gafai - K/G Wakilin Yamma; Gafai - K/G Alkali Mai-Wada; Gafai - K/G Ladan Soso; Bakin Gida / K/G Yusuf Bakin Gida; Nasarawa Day - K/G Mai-Unguwa I; Nasarawa Day - K/G Mai-Unguwa II; Masanawa - K/G Mai-Unguwa; Masanawa K/G Yusuf Mai Takalmi; Masanawa Ofishin Wakilin Yamma I; Masanawa Ofishin Wakilin Yamma II; Masanawa / K/Gidan Ashahabu I; Masanawa / K/Gidan Ashahabu II; Masanawa / K/Gdan Abba; Masanawa / K/Gdan Bature D, Yamma I; Masanawa / K/Gdan Bature D, Yamma II; Kofar Yandaka / K/Gidan Alh. Ma'a I; Kofar Yandaka / K/Gidan Alh. Ma'a II; Kofar Yandaka / K/Gidan Zubairu Shakka; Kofar Yandaka / K/G Sule Tsantsami; Kofar Yandaka / Filin Polo I; Kofar Yandaka / Filin Polo II
Katsina	Wakilin Kudu I	Yantaba / K/Gidan Yandaka; Yantaba / K/Gidan A. Gambo I; Yantaba / K/Gidan A. Gambo II; Bambadawa / K/Gidan Dodo Tela; Bambadawa / K/Gidan Mai-Unguwa; Rafin Dadi - R/Dadi Pri. School I; Rafin Dadi - R/Dadi Pri. School II; Rafin Dadi - R/Dadi Pri. School III; Tsohuwar Kasuwa / Dan Marna Pri. School I; Tsohuwar Kasuwa / Danmarna Pri. School II; Albaba Dan Marna Pri. School; Ganganbu / Kantin Alh. Muntari; Tsohuwar / Kasuwa Gidan A. Junaidu; Yansiliyu - K/G Sha'aibu Dan Dauda; Yanshuni K/Gidan Bala Driver; Yanshuni - K/Gidan Maji Dadi; Darma / Bakin Chediya; Darma / K/Gidan Alh. Falalu; Mararraba / K/Gidan Alwaru I; Mararraba / K/Gidan Alwaru II; Post Office / Bakin Post Office; Unguwar Alikali / Ung Alkali I; Unguwar Alikali / Ung Alkali II; Unguwar Sharruffai / K/Gidan Abba Na-Ikko; Yan Kyaure / Bakin Rijiya; Sararin Kuka / S/Kuka Pri. School; Rafin Dadi - K/Gidan Iro/Isansi; Sararin Kuka - K/Gidan Maiunguwaturaji; Alababa Dan Marna / Pri. School II; Rafin Dadi / W/Kudu Office
Katsina	Wakilin Kudu II	Sabuwar Kasuwa / Garama Pri. School I; Sabuwar Kasuwa / Garama Pri. School II; Garama / Garama Pri. School; K/Kaura Lay-Out - Layout Pri. School I; K/Kaura Lay-Out - Layout Pri. School II; K/Kaura - K/Kaura Pri. School I; K/Kaura - K/Kaura Pri. School II; K/Kaura - K/Kaura Pri. School III; S/Kasuwa K/Gidan A. NaB Reading Room; Islamiyya - Bakin Masallachi; Kankara Central Dissipensary Adada; Sabon Layi Gidan Radio I; Sabon Layi Gidan Radio II; Sabon Layi Gidan Daniya III; S/Kasuwa - K/Gidan Alh. Abbati I; S/Kasuwa - K/Gidan Alh. Abbati II; S/Kasuwa - K/Gidan Yahaya Dan Daudu; S/Kasuwa - K/G Alh. Musa F. T. A; Sabon Layi /Gidan Sarkin Yaki I; Sabon Layi /Gidan Sarkin Yaki II; Sabuwar Kasuwa - K/G Alh. Haruna Kusa; K/Kaura - K/Gidan Dahiru Ahmed; K/Kaura - K/Gidan Galadima; K/Kaura - K/Gidan Kaura I; K/Kaura - K/Gidan Kaura II; S/Kasuwa / K/G Alh. Nadada
Katsina	Wakilin Arewa (A)	Unguwar Yari Flin Ung Yari I; Unguwar Yari Filin Ung Yari II; Ung Yari Ofishin W/Arewa; Ung. Madawaki K/Gidan S/Daura; Ung. Madawaki K/Gidan Madawaki; Filin Bugu K/G Alh. Abdu Taki I; Filin Bugu K/G Alh. Abdu Taki II; Filin Bugu K/G Alh. Abdu Kafa; Marnar Gangare K/G A. Ali Mai Canji I; Marnar Gangare K/G A. Ali Mai Canji II; Marnar Gangare K/G A. Falalu; Ung. Madawaki Ambuttai Pri. School I; Ung. Madawaki Ambuttai Pri. School II; Ung. Jaji Bakin Chediya; Gambarawa K/G Salele Bature; Gambarawa K/G Alh. Almu; Barazaki K/Gidan Urwatu; Barazaki K/Gidan Ila Ali I; Barazaki K/Gidan Ila Ali II
Katsina	Wakilin Arewa (B)	Dutsin-Safe Low Cost / D/Safe Pri. School I; Dutsin-Safe Low Cost / D/Safe Pri. School II; Dutsin-Safe / Gidan Taki; Bakin Kasuwa / Gidan Magaji Gajama I; Bakin Kasuwa / Gidan Magaji Gajama II; Bakin Kasuwa / K/G Sarkin Fada; Gobarau - Gobarau Pri. School; Ung. Labo - K/G Abu Mai Cefane; B/Kasuwa - K/Gidan A. Dalha; Farin Yaro / Farin Yaro Pri. School; Ung. Marusa - K/Gidan Idi Yamel; Ung. Ciroma - K/Gidan Ciroma I; Ung. Ciroma - K/Gidan Ciroma II; Lamama / K/Gidan Tambura; Sabuwar Kofa / S/Kofa Pri. School; Masallacin Idi - Filin Masallacin Idi
Katsina	Shinkafi 'A	Unguwar Ango - K/G. Abu Na Gona; Gezawa - Gezawa; Fage - K/G Mall. Musa; Ung. Magaji - K/G Mai Gari; Saulawa - K/G Mai Ung Muazu; Saulawa - K/G Sarkin Tasha; Ung. Tafa - K/G Mall. Amadi; S/Gari K/Rafa - K/G A. Sabe; Kauran Rafa - K/G Mai Unguwa; Marai - K/G Mai Unguwa Muazu; Dan, Nabaso / K/G Mall. Sule I; Dan, Nabaso / K/G Mall. Sule II
Katsina	Shinkafi 'B'	Modoji K/G Mai Unguwa Musa; Modoji K/G Mall. Mati; Makera / Pri. School; Makera K/G / Mai Unguwa Kano; Kambarawa - Kambarawa Pri. School; Kambarawa - K/G Mai Ung. Jatau; Sabuwar Bakuru - K/G M/Unguwa Mani; Modoji - Modoji; Kwado / K/G. Mai Ung. Adamu; Kadafawa - K/G Mai / Unguwa Saidu; Kwado / K/Gidan Alh. Kado
Katsina	Wakili Kudu III	Inwala / K/Gidan Muntari Tela I; Inwala / K/Gidan Muntari Tela II; Inwala / K/Gidan Alh. Maiwada; Inwala / K/Gidanmila; Inwala Yan - Alewa I; Inwala Yan - Alewa II; Sabuwar Unguwa S/Ung Pri. School; Sabuwar Unguwa K/Gidan A. Abdul-Rahman; Sabuwar Unguwa Kwauren Dorowa; Kofar Kaura K/Gidan Abdul-Malik; Kofar Kaura K/Gidan Kofar Sama; Tayoyi K/Gidan A. Sama Roba; Sabuwar Mahauta Open Space; Kofar / Kaura - K/Gidan Alh. Danja; Bayan Atc - K/G Asp. Abdulrahman I; Bayan Atc - K/G Asp. Abdulrahman II; Nakowa Bread / Na-Kowa Bread Gindin Dorowa I; Nakowa Bread / Na-Kowa Bread Gindin Dorowa II; Shararrar Pipe / Dan Bedi I; Shararrar Pipe / Dan Bedi II; Gidan Dawa - Gidan Dawa; A. T. C - A. T. C; Sabuwar Unguwa - Maikudi Hotels I; Sabuwar Unguwa - Maikudi Hotels II; Ksrc Estate - Ksrc Housing Estate; Sabon Gari Wtc - S/Gari Police Station; Shararrar Pipe K/G Alh. Yahaya; Inwala - K/Gidan Gogalo
Kurfi	Tsauri 'A'	Tsauri 'A' Primary School; Gwanzo I Pri. Sch.; Tsauri C - Tsauri - Dispensary; Yakanoma - Yakanoma; Hakau - Hakau; Tunya - Tunya; Gazarawa - Gazarawa; Tudun Gabas - Tudun Gabas; Baiga - Baiga; Shunawa - Shunawa
Kurfi	Tsauri 'B'	Fadama/Takatsaba - Fadama Primary School; Gunzo I Gunzo Primary School; Danagali - Dispensary; Kaware East - Kaware East; Kaware West - Kaware West; Tunga - Tunga; Gatakawa - Gatakawa; K/Barawayya - K/Barawayya; Wayya - Wayya; Gwanzo II Gwanzo; Waiye - Waiye
Kurfi	Kurfi 'A'	Kofar Fada - K/Fada; Kauyen Baidu - U/Baidu; Kofar Arewa - K/Arewa; Kofar Yamma - K/Yamma; Tsohuwar Kasuwa - T/Kasuwa; Kofar Nasarawa - K/Nasarawa; Sabon Layi I - S/Layi; Sabon Layi II - S/Layi; Kaguwa - Kaguwa; Kofa - Kofa; Randa/Danrimi - Danrimi; Gabas Da Kasuwa - Police Station
Kurfi	Kurfi 'B'	Magama I - Magama Pri. School; Magama III - Magama Pri. School; Fadumawa Dispensary; Dadawa - Dadawa; Yakasai - Yakasai; Geza - Geza; Kofa - Kofa; Dahirawa/Muji - Bahirawa; Daram - Daram; Magama II (Sauyawa) - Sauyawa; Kudage - Kadage; Kauyen D/Amarya - K/D / Amarya; Bahirawa - Bahirawa
Kurfi	Rawayau 'A'	Rawayau North - Rawayau North; Rawayau Central - Rawayau Central I; Rawayau Central - Rawayau Central II; Farar Kasa - Farar Kasa; Ramayau South - V/Head; Tudawa - Tudawa; Yalwa - Yalwa; Awaki Banza / Awaki Banza; Dangawo - Dangawo; Rawayau South II - B/Kasuwa; Rawayau North - Rawayan North
Kurfi	Rawayau 'B'	Sabon Gari -Sabon Gari; Salihawa - Salihawa; Burabura - Burabura; Baniya/Kwaram - K/Kwaram; Yar Unguwa I - Yarunguwa; Yarmarke - Yarmarke; Yar Randa - Danya; Gobirawa - Gobirawa; Babban Gida - B/Gida; Yarunguwa/Dorogu - Y/Dorogu; Yan Makera Yanmakera
Kurfi	Birchi	Tashar Bara'U - T/Bara'U; Makera - Makera; Baganau - Baganau; Chediya/Dukano - Dukano; Goda - Goda; Birchi Central / Pri. School; Birchi South Pri. School; Ajiwa - Ajiwa; Masaka - Masaka; Birchi South I Pri. School; Birchi Central Pri. School
Kurfi	Barkiyya	Barkiya 'A' Pri. School; Kukoki - Kukoki; Yarliya'U - Y/Liya'U; Yarmarke - Y/Marke; Yar Barza - Yar Barza; Sabon Layi - S/Layi; Kumare - Kumare; Barkiya - Barkiya; Sabon Layi - Sabon Layi; Kumare/Badole - Kumare
Kurfi	Wurma 'A'	Wurma A - W/Gari; Wurma B - W/Arewa; Wurma C - W/Gari; Kudewa East K/East; Kudewa West - K/West; Gatarawa - Gatarawa; Tsamiya - Tsamiya; Karangiya - Kangariya; Unguwar Baure - U/Baure; Wurma Dispensary - Dispensary; Kudewa East Pri. School
Kurfi	Wurma 'B'	Lambo - Lambo; Suda - Suda; Beguwa Beguwa; Tamu - Tamu; Fandogari - Fandogari; Yalle - Yalle; Balagawa - Balagawa; Chikawa - Chikawa; Gumba - Gumba; Farindutse - Farin Dutse; Lambo 'B' - Lambo
Kusada	Kusada	Kusada (Ung. Kaya) Pri. School; Kandare - Open Space; Issawa Open Space; Labchawa (Gidan Mada) - Open Space; Burtu (Kofar Fada) T. V Centre I; Burtu (Kofar Fada) T. V Centre II; Gidan Goga (Allodawa) Open Space; Bakin Kasuwa - T. V Centr I; Bakin Kasuwa - T. V Centre II
Kusada	Dudunni	Dudunni Pri. School; Gidan Bango - Open Space; Dungurmi Open Space; Rugar Ya'U - Open Space; Zangon Yasanya - Open Space; Madakawa - Open Space; Jofalawa - Open Space; Gidan Fako - Open Space; Tsauwawa Ruga - Open Space
Kusada	Kaikai	Kaikai Haraba Open Space; Radi Pri. School; Malamawa - Opens Space; Matari (Rugage) - Open Space; Keba - Open Space; Runji - Open Space; Gunsawa Open Space; Aganta - Open Space; S/Gari Ung. Barebari Open Space; Ung. Leko Jaruma Open Space; Gandawa - Open Space
Kusada	Mawashi	Mawashi - T. V Centre; Makaurachi Primary School; Chamiya - Open Space; Barawa - Primary School; Magadawa - Open Space; Tsanna - Open Space; Yarkisago - Open Space; Haraba - Primary School
Kusada	Boko	Dangamau Pri. School; Sabon Gari T. V. Centre; Yan Zaru - Open Space; Dan Butale (Baurawa) Open Space; Yan Dorawa / Baurawa - Open Space; Sire - Open Space; Gwadabawa - Open Space; Rugar Makada - Open Space; Ingawar Bebo - Open Space; Sabon Gari TV Centre
Kusada	Bauranya 'A'	Bauranya (S/Kanya) Ppri. School; Santar Datsawa - Open Space; Kewaye (Haraba) - Open Space; Mairana - Primary School; Ruga Kolawa - Open Space
Kusada	Bauranya 'B'	Kafarda Pri. School; Kewaye (Dandali) - Open Space; Tafatsa - Open Space; Maigamawa Open Space; Rumawa (Tsuge) Open Space; Kutunkawar Yar Manau Open Space
Kusada	Yashe 'A	Yashe Zango - Open Space; Haraba Fada TV Centre; Yandadi - Open Space; Kawari - Primary School; Damari - Open Space; Bagari Pri. School
Kusada	Yashe 'B'	Gidan Mutum Daya; Jeri Primary School; Mazoji - Open Space; Sabarawa - Open Space; Maijigira - Open Space; Magama - Open Space; Saranmalam - Open Space
Mai'Adua	Bumbum 'A'	Anashir - Kofar Gidan Maiunguwa; Bumbum - Bumbum Pri. School; Gwabron Maje - Pri. School; Jinferi - Kofar Gidan Maiunguwa; Kaki Bumbum - K/Gidan Maia'Ungwa; Kilaki - K/Gidan Mai'Unguwa; Makerawa - K/Gidan Mai'Unguwa; Tsiga Baha K/Gidan Mai'Unguwa; Tsiga Sanda - K/Gidan Mai'Unguwa; Unguwar Jummai - K/Gidan Mai'Unguwa; Unguwar Yakubu -K/Gidan Mai'Unguwa; Tsiga Bashayi - K/Gidan Mai Unguwa; Shekyal Pri. School
Mai'Adua	Bumbum 'B'	Buduma - Buduma Pri. School; Danmusa - K/Gidan Mai'Unguwa; Dan Nasara K/Gidan Mai'Unguwa; Kadangwaras K/Gidan Mai'Unguwa; Kudi Jika - K/Gidan Mai'Unguwa; Kwadage -K/Gidan Maiungwa; Maidaniya Pri. School; Maikwamame - Kofar Fidan Mai Unguwa; Tuga Ta Habe - K/Gidan Mai Unguwa; Maidanya - Pri. School Maidanya Pri. School; Kwadage - K/Gidan Maiunguwa; Tuga Gyalle - K/Gidan Maiunguwa
Mai'Adua	Danyashe	Bakyara - Bakiyara Pri. School; Dan Yashe Baushe - Kofar Haro; Dan Yashe Damo - Pri. School; Dan Yashe Isa - Kofar Gidan Isa; Dan-Yashe Sale - Adult Education; Huguma - Huguma Pri. School; Kurchi 'A' - K/Gidan Maiunguwa; Kurchi 'B' - K/Gidan Maiunguwa; Madobawa - Kgidan Amiunguwa; Shangel Gabo - G/Giidan Maiuguwa; Shangel Gangu - G/Giidan Maiuguwa; Tsabu Chidare - K/Gidan Maiunguwa; Tsabu Habe - Pri. School; Tsabu Sale - K/Gidan Maiungwa; Yashe - Yashe Pri. School; Magina - Magina Pri. School; Danyashe Pri. School; Kurchi Pri. School
Mai'Adua	Mai'Adua 'A'	Maiadua Gwadabe - Pri. School I; Maiadua Gwadabe - Pri. School II; Maiadua Gwadabe/Rumfar Zana; Maiadua Magaji/Ahmed Pri. School I; Maiadua Magaji/Ahmed Pri. School II; Maiadua Magaji/ - Kanti Dispensary; K/G Mai Unguwa Magaji(Mai'Adua Magaji Rumfar Zana); Mai'Magarya - K/Gdan Mai Unguwa; Mai'Adua Gwadabe - Fumfar Zana I; Mai'Adua Gwadabe - Fumfar Zana II
Mai'Adua	Mai'Adua 'B'	Dankindi - K/Gidan Maiunguwa; Kongolam - Pri. School I; Kongolam - Pri. School II; Maiadua Ali - Rumfar Zana I; Maiadua Ali - Rumfar Zana II; Maiadua Ali - Model I Pri. School; Maiturmi Sabuwa - K/Gidan Maiuguwa; Maiturmi Tsohuwa Pri. School; Muludu - Pri. School; Shiroka - K/Gidan Maiunguwa; Kongolam K/Gidan Mai Unguwa; Kongolam Pri. School; Kongolam K/Gidan Maiuguwa
Mai'Adua	Mai'Adua 'C'	Daba - Pri. School; Dagora/Rage/Buke - Pri. School; Galadimawa Pri. School; Unguwar Labe Pri. School; Insharuwa - Kofar Gamji; Maifaru - K/Gamji; Sarkin Noma Pri. School I; Sarkin Noma Pri. School II; Unguwar Jibo - K/Gidan Maiunguwa; Insharuwa - Kofar Kamji; Dagora Pri. School; S/Noma III Pri. School
Mai'Adua	Mai Koni 'A'	Agala /K/Maiunguwa; Bechi/K/G/ Maiunguwa; Dadin Sariki /K/Gidan Mai Unguwa; Dansawa/K/G Maiunguwa; Danyawa Ali/Zubairu/ Kofar Gidan / Ali; Danyawa Zumbul/Pri. School; Dumurukwal Magaji/ K/G Mai Gari; Dumurukwal Seri/K/G Maigari; Guzu K/G/Maigari; Maikoni/Pri. School; Tadi/K/G Maigari; Yarogyal-Kanta/K/G Maigari; Yarogyal-Seri K/G Maigari; Maikoni II/Pri. School
Mai'Adua	Mai Koni 'B'	Baida/K/G Maigari; Bishirawa/Pri. School; Maigari Alti/Pri. School; Mai Gari / Bala / Mallamawa Pri. School; Shabewa Baruwa/K/G Maigari; Ung. Tukur/K/G Maigari; Yakara/K/G Maigari; Ya'Yaye - Kan Hanya; Yankara/ Kofar / Mai Gari Maigari; Shabewa Bala/K/G Bala
Mai'Adua	Natsalle	Arha Kofar / Gidan Mai Unguwa; Dandodo - K/Gidan Liman; Domai - Pri. School; Gojogojo Pri. School I; Gojogojo Pri. School II; Kahe - K/Gidan Maiunguwa; Maigoribai - K/Gidan Maigari; Maibagaruwa - K/Gidan Maigari; Natsalle Magaji - K/Gidan Maigari; Mai Goribai - K/Gidan Maigari; Rafin Abzinawa - K/Gidan Maigari; Randa Juli - K/Gidan Maigari; Natsalle Maza - K/Gidan Maigari; Randa Yaku - K/Gidan Maigari; Sharta - K/Gidan Maigari; Tofakai - K/Gidan Maigari; Walafulani - K/Gidan - Maigari; Wala Habe - K/Gidan Yau; Zanguna - K/Gidan Maigari; Sharta K/Gidan Maigari; Wala - K/Gidan Maigari
Mai'Adua	Koza	Bula Pri. School; Dawakawa - K/Maigari; Gagir Habe - Kofar Gidan Mai Gari; Gagir Fulani - K/Gidan Maiunguwa; Jajaye - K/Gidan Mainguwa; Jassai Pri. School; Jirdebe I Pri. School; Kakirana Musa - Pri. School; Kalamsami - K/Gidan Maiunguwa; Kokotuko - K/Gidan Maiunguwa; Kokotuko - Pri. School; Koza Bello - K/Gidan Maiuguwa; Koza Habe K/Gidan Maiunguwa; Maharba - Kofar Gamji; Manmani - Kofar Maiuguwa; Raba Fulani -K/Gidan Maiunguwa; Saitawa Pri. School; Sukub - K/Gidan Mainguwa; Tilia Habe - K/Gidan Maiunguwa; Tilla Fulani - K/G. Unguwa; Tsauri Shehu - K/G Maiunguwa; Tsauri Sumaye - K/G Maiunguwa; Tsohon Birni Pri. School; Yanhakum - Pri. School; Yukka -K/G Maiunguwa; Jirdadejamaa - Pri. School; Koza Habe Pri. School; Jirdade Pri. School; Kaikirana - K/G Maiunguwa; Yanhakum Pri. School
Malufashi	Malum Fashi 'A'	Kofar Fada Girls Day Pri. School I Pi. School; Kofar Fada Girls Day Pri. School II; Kofar Fada Girls Day Pri. School III; Kofar Fada Girls Day Pri. School IV; Galadima's Office; Kofar Gidan Baki; Kofar Gidan Alh. Bello; Kotu Ta Daya; Gangarawa Adult Education Class I; Gangarawa Adult Education Class II; Social Welfare House; Gangarawa - Open Space I; Gangarawa - Open Space II; Gangarawa - Gindin Bedi; Gwamutsawa Isalmiyya Class; Unguwar Sodagi Tunau Pri. School I; Unguwar Sodanji Tunau Pri. School II; Local Govt. Secondary School; Abuth/Ggss Abuth Staff Quarts; Unguwar Garba Gardi Gindin Bedi; Unguwar Garba Gardi Gindin Tingilin; Unguwar Garba Gardi Madaura Shanu; Ung. Garba Gardi Madaura Pri. School; Ung. Sambo - Sambo Pri. School I; Ung. Sambo - Sambo Pri. School II; Danbilago - Danbilago Pri. School I; Danbilago - Danbilago Pri. School II; Ung. Dambo - Dambo Pri. School; Ung. Danjuma - Sallau Pri. School I; Ung. Danjuma - Sallau Pri. School II; Tsohuwa Kasuwa; Ung. Danjuma - Gidan Rimi; Ung. Sarkin Goro - Gindin Falwaya; Ung. Sarkin Goro -Open Space I; Ung. Sarkin Goro -Open Space II; Ung. Mai Saje (Danfili) Bakin Hanya I; Ung. Mai Saje (Danfili) Bakin Hanya II; Ung. Halilu Galadima Pri. School I; Ung. Halilu Galadima Pri. School II; Ung. Halilu - Area Court II; Police Barracks - Madaki; Police Barracks - Nitel
Malufashi	Malum Fashi 'B'	Unguwar Aliyu - Aliyu Pri. School I; Unguwar Aliyu - Aliyu Pri. School II; Unguwar Aliyu - Aliyu Pri. School III; Unguwar Aliyu - Kofar Gidan Bako Mataza; Tudun Wada - Dudi Pri. School I; Tudun Wada - Dudi Pri. School II; Tudun Wada - Dudi Pri. School III; Tudun Wada - Dudi Pri. School IV; Tudun Wada - Dudi Pri. School V; Tudun Wada - Old Bonanza; Tudun Wada - Kofar Gidan Rabi'U Magaji; Tudun Wada - W/Board Lowcost Houses; Tudun Wada - Kofar Gidan Alh. Safiyanu; S/Layin Dantafi - Sabon Layi Pri. School I; S/Layin Dantafi - Sabon Layi Pri. School II; Ung/Aliyu - Aliyu Pri. School; Ung/Dutse - U/Dutse - Gindin Cediya; Tura Isamiya - Tura Pri. Shool I; Tura Isamiya - Tura Pri. Shool II; Ung. Halilu Payamasa/Shade Tsamiya I; Ung. Halilu Payamasa/Shade Tsamiya II; Ung. Halilu Payamasa/Shade Tsamiya III; Ung. Halilu Payamasa/Shade Tsamiya IV; Ung. Halilu Payamasa Shade Gidin Kuka I; Ung. Halilu Payamasa Shade Gidin Kuka II; B. C. G. A. - Sale G. Pri. School I; B. C. G. A. - Sale G. Pri. School II; B. C. G. A. - Sale G. Pri. School III; Ung/Sale - Kofar Gidan Danbaba; Ung/Sale - Sale Mai Unguwa House; Unguwa Sale - Chediyar Mai Unguwar
Malufashi	Yaba	Ung/Salihawa - Yaba Dispensary I; Ung/Salihawa - Yaba Dispensary II; Salihawa Gana - Open Space; Kabara Yaba - Yaba Pri. School; Marmara - Open Space (Market) I; Marmara - Open Space (Market) II; Marmara - Ung. Runji; M. Kankara - M/Kankara Pri. School; Tsaunin Cinya - Open Space; Marmara Ung Wazamai; Ung/Wanzamai - Wanzamai Pri. School II; Ung/Hanau - Hanau Pri. School I; Ung/Hanau - Hanau Pri. School II; Ung/Gambo - Gambo Pri. School I; Ung/Gambo - Gambo Pri. School II; Burdugau G. - Burdugau G. Pri. School I; Burdugau G. - Burdugau G. Pri. School II; Yar Teba - Yar Teba Pri. School; Kabara; Ung/Ringi/Marmara Dan Fili Ung. Ringi
Malufashi	Rawan Sanyi	Ruwan Sanyi - Ruwan Sanyi Pri. School I; Ruwan Sanyi - Ruwan Sanyi Pri. School II; Katanga - Katanga Pri. School; Ung Barau Katanga; Maijangali - Magangali Pri. School; Kurmin Sarki - Village Centre; N. Asarawa - Village Centre; Katanga Ung Barau Aya Ga Tsohuwa; Yartsakuwa - Open Space; Ayaga Sabuwa
Malufashi	Borin Dawa	Borin Dawa - Borin Dawa Pri. School I; Borin Dawa - Borin Dawa Pri. School II; Borin Dawa - Borin Dawa Pri. School III; Agagiwa - Agagiwa Pri. School; Kwarsu - Village - Centre; Kuka Madogaras - Madogara Pri. School; S/Garin B. Dawa Market Square; Zango -Yarkwakware Pri. School; Yambita - Village Centre; Wari - Village Centre
Malufashi	Yarmama	Ung. Yarmama - Yarmama Pri. School I; Ung. Yarmama - Yarmama Pri. School II; Ung. Yarmama - Yarmama Pri. School III; Yarmama/Gwanamarde - Gwanamarde Pri. School; Gwanzamawa - Village Centre; Gorar Yarmama - Gora Dispsensary; Ung. Daudu/Kanku Village Centre; Gorar Yarmama - Village Centre; Unguwar Buzu - T. V Centre; Unguwar Da'U - Shade Cikin Gari; Ung. Buzu / Ung. Buzu Open Space
Malufashi	Gorar Dansaka	Unguwar Gora - Gora Pri. School; Gorar Dansaka - Gora Pri. School; Fanga - Village Centre; Gangara - Gangara Pri. School; Bauda/Gangare Pri. School; Ung. Chida Village Centre; Yarraha - Yarraha Pri. Shool I; Yarraha - Yarraha Pri. Shool II; Lamuntanni -Lumuntanni Pri. School; Lumuntanni -/Kuriri - Kuriiri Village Centre; Lumuntanni -Gundurawa - Lumuntanni Pri. Schoole; Ruga Wajemvillage Centre; Bauda L/Bakoshi - Bauda Pri. School; Yartasha - Bakin Kwalta; Ung. Hudi - Village Centre
Malufashi	Dansarai	Dansarai - Pri. School I; Dansarai - Pri. School II; Dansarai/Kgabas - Adult Education Class I; Dansarai/Kgabas - Adult Education Class II; Ung. Kadi - Village Centre; Tunkuda - Tunkuda Pri. School I; Tunkuda - Tunkuda Pri. School II; Aljiyawa - Aljiyawa Pri. School
Malufashi	Makaurachi	Makaurachi - Pri. School I; Makaurachi - Pri. School II; Makaurachi - Pri. School III; Makaurachi - Pri. School IV; Ung. Mahauta - Adult Education Class I; Ung. Mahauta - Adult Education Class II; Tudun Kudi Pri. School I; Tudun Kudi II Dugarawa; Jakwallawa - Pri. School; Unguwar Ahi Village Centre; Badawa Fulani - Pri. School; Badawa Fulani - Village Centre; Yandamo - Village Centre
Malufashi	Dayi	Dayi - T. V Room I; Dayi - T. V Room II; Dayi - Dispensary; Ung Dayi - Dayi Pri. School I; Ung Dayi - Dayi Pri. School II; Sabon Garin Dayi - Dayi Pri. School I; Sabon Garin Dayi - Dayi Pri. School II; Ung. Maga - Village Centre I; Ung. Maga - Village Centre II; Dayi Farin Hawa - Bakin Kwalta; Babban Duhu Gero - Village Centre; Ung. Bugau - Bakin Rijiyar Bugau; Dantasshi - Village Centre; Kadanyar Gidan Magus - Village Centre; B/Duhu/Katsalle - Village Centre; Kalgo - Kalgo Pri. School; Santar Kalgo - Village Centre; Al Makiyayi; Gorar Dayi - Pri. School; Gorar Dayi Yandoka Pri. School
Malufashi	Na-Alma	Na'alma - Pri. School I; Na'alma - Pri. School II; Na'alma - Open Space; Na-Alma/Karo - Pri School; Na-Alma/Karo - Open Space; Garangoza - Pri. School; Garangoza - Open Space; Kwandawa - Kwandawa Pri. School; Unguwar Manna; Ung/Digo/Barau - Ung/Digo Pri. School; Ung Barau K/ Ung
Mani	Bujawa/Gewayau	Buyawa/Gewayau; Garin Kawari - K/Maiunguwa; Randawa - K/Maiungwa; Garin Amadu - K/Maiungwa; Dogon Marke - K/Maiungwa; Agaisa - K/Maiungwa; Yaunawa - K/Maiungwa; Yanfari - K/Maiungwa; Kwangwama K/Maiunguwa; Yalbibi K/Maiunguwa; Isufawa - Isufawa Pri. School; Bujeje - Isufawa Pri. School; Taiki - Isufawa Pri. School; Gallawa - Isufawa Pri. School; Rafawa - Rafawa Pri. School; Wailagande - K/Maiunguwa; Kurket - K/Maiunguwa; Kafasu - K/Maiunguwa; Tuskulle - K/Maiunguwa; Randawa - K/Unguwa
Mani	Duwan/Makau	Marke - Marke Pri. School; Duwan Taru - Duwan Taru Pri. School; Kofawa - Kofa Pri. School; Karjawa - G/Unguwa; Sabon Garin Yamma - G/Unguwa; Duwan Bakin Kasuwa - Kasuwa; Fango - Fango Pri. School; Makau Garin Fulani - Pri. School; Makau Kwakwara - G/Unguwa; Gabi - Pri. School; Yankazo G/Unguwa; Badole - G/Unguwa; Azai Pri. School; Wurdugwal - Pri. School; Gamda - Pri. School; Makau/Gidan Fulani Pri. School; Duwan Birni - Duwan Birni Pri. School
Mani	Mani	Mani Kofar Yamma - Model Pri. School; Mani Kofar Arewa TV Centre; Mani Kofar Kudu - Majema; Katoge - Pri. School; Randawa - Yamma; Salumawa - K/Ung; Tokarchi - K/Liman; Kadarabe - K/Ung; Santar Laka - K/Ung; Mani Kofar Yamma - Centre Pri. School; Mani Kofar Kudu - T. V Centre; Mani Kofar Arewa - Majema; Mani Kofar Yamma - Central Pri. School; Katoge - Durbi Pri. School; Tsaurara - K/Gunguwa; Mani Kofar Yamma Model Pri. School
Mani	Bagiwa	Bagiwa/Tumurzawa - Bagiwa Pri. School; Farfaru - G/Unguwa; Duru - Duru Pri. School; Mahuta - Ajiya Pri. School; Nasarawa - G/Ung; Yalli - G/Ung; Tudun-Wada G/Ung; Samaru - G/Ung; Nasarawa - K/Unguwa
Mani	Tsagem/Takusheyi	Tsagem - Tsagem Pri. School; Musawar Habe - K/Balange; Musawar Fulani - Tako; Baryawar Habe - Tsha; Baryawar Bugaje - G/Liman; Kwabra - K/Ung; Gunki - Pri. School; Dindin - K/Ung; Takusheyi Pri. School; Shautawa - Shautawa; Hayewa - K/Unguwa; Indukun Pri. School; Fankadan - Tasha; Sheme Pri. School; Gagen - K/Ung; Gamdana - Pri. School; Kuna - Tasha; Dan Magira - K/Gung; Zamguna - K/Ung; Gunki Pri. School
Mani	Hamcheta	Hamcheta - Pri. School I; Hamcheta - Pri. School II; Gallawa Pri. School; Jachi - K/Unguwa; Danmanau - K/Unguwa; Samfa - K/Unguwa; Aliyaba - K/Unguwa; Turawa K/Ugnuwa; Kugado - K/Unguwa; Binoni G/Unguwa; Maigoto - K/Unguwa; Aliyaba - K/Maiunguwa
Mani	Kwatta	Kwatta - Kwatta Pri. School; Kwatta Makaurachi - K/Ung; Kwalkodau Pri. School; Tsamiyar Yara - G/Ung; Wasakawa - Pri. Shool; Charambi - Pri. School; Danfau - G/Ung; Gawon Mala Pri. School; Ung. Tudu - K/Unguwa
Mani	Machika	Machika Pri. School I; Machika Pri. School II; Taballawa/Zango Pri. School; Madachiya Chince - Kukar/Kumandar; Dokator Fulani/Wurjuno Pri. School; Badawa/Sjidda - K/Yamma; Aniyawa/Wadigawa/Kangartsha/Maigashi Pri. School; Kijibta - Pri. School; Badawa/Sabon Garin Jidda - Jidda
Mani	Muduru	Muduru Shaiskawa - K/Abashe; Muduru Alkalawa - K/Ung; Muduruk/Yamma - Model Pri. School; Dagiyawa - K/Ung; Kuringa - K/Ung; Damawa/Bangel - K/Ung; Daniya/Wailare Pri. School; Daniya / Wailare Primary School; Muduru K/Yamma Pri. School; Shirinya Pri. School; Nasarawa - K/Ung; Riya - K/Ung; Muduru Akalawa; Muduru Kofar Yamma
Mani	Jani	Jani Kofar Gabas Model Primary School; Jani Ung. Liman Kiliman I; Jani Ung. Liman Kiyamma II; Jani Bakin Gulbi Kiyamma; Mailaba Primary School; Adamus Health Clinic; Dokota - Pri. School; Sambawa - K/Unguwa; Dangawo - K/Unguwa; Zango Rimi - K/Unguwa; Yarachakarande - K/Unguwa; Yantakori Pri. School; Jani Kofar Gabas - Model Pri. School
Mashi	Mashi	Mashi Yamma I - Model Pri. School; Mashi Yamma Ib - Model Pri. School; Mashi B/Kasuwa I - K/G Kamaye; Mashi B/Kasuwa II - K/G Kamaye; Mashi Arewa/T. Wada - Gamzo Pri. School; Mashi Arewa/T. Wada II - Gamzo Pri. School; Katoge - K/G Shuaidu Barau; Tsintsiya - Pri. School; Dokawa - Pri. School; Toranke - Pri. School; Dangara - Pri. School; Buluma - Pri. School; Zakiliya - Gamji; Yar Riga - Primary School; Kankuyawa/Nasarawa - B/Dajinn; Mashi Gabas/K/G S/Fulani; S/G Zabaro; Cidawa; Mashi Yamma Model Pri. School; Alayidi
Mashi	S/Rijiya	Dankada Makau - K/G Dankada I; Dankada Makau - K/G Dankada II; Makerawa - K/G M/Ung; Kaware Burdami - Pri. School; Majigiri I - Pri. School; Majigiri II - Pri. School; Birnin Mamman - K/G M/Ung; Murnai/Godi - R/Makaho; Wakili - Giginya; Duma/Chalawa - K/G Maishanu; Dababba/S. Rijiya - Tanki; Dan Malka - Pri. School; Dandogari/ Pri. School; Dangoshi//K. G. Maiung
Mashi	Bamble	Bamle I - K/G S. Goshi; Bamle I - K/G H. Buku; Kasanki I - Pri. School; Kasanki II - Pri. School; B/Kuka - Pri. School I; B/Kuka - Pri. School II; Kuntaru - K/G Lushe; Gindawa - K/G Iro; Gindawa - K/G Maikaho; Kamarawa - Pri. School; Kamarawa II - Pri. School; Ung. Biri - Pri. School; Sabara - Dankaki; Hamis Gabas/Jasuma; Hamis Gidan Bara
Mashi	Gallu	Agala - K/G Bage; Agallu I Pri. School; Guarta - K/G Gyarta; Danfardu - K/G Danfardu; Fara I - K. G. Gardi; Fara II - K. G. Fara; Gallu - K/G Gallu; Shiriya - K/G Shiriya; Chadder I Pri. School; Chadder II Pri. School; Shiriya Abuja/Pri. School; Kwankewa/K/G Ayuda
Mashi	Sonkaya	Kaware Arewa - Pri. School; Kaware Kudu - K/G. Kaware; Sankaya Kudu - Dispensary; Kofai Abuja Pri. School; Mashanya - Pri. School; Ung. Duhu - K/G Duhu; Riniyal - K. G Riniyal; Tona - Tashar Kalgo; Sonkaya Arewa/Pri. School; S. Gari/Pri. School
Mashi	Doguru 'A'	Doguru II - Pri. School; Isheshe II - K. G M/Ung; Isheshe I - K. G M/Ung; Badauri I - K. G. M/Ung; Badauri II - K. G. M/Ung; Bagawa I - K. G. M/Ung; Bagawa II - K. G. M/Ung; Washemi - K. G M/Ungu; Jasuma Gari - Pri. School; Jasuma Dankaro K. G M/Ung; Badauri III K. G M/Ung; Fagen Kalgo - K. G M/Ung; Doguru I - K/G Maigari
Mashi	Doguru 'B'	Kindigi - K/G Mai Ungu.; Darkima I - K/G Mai'Ung; Danlako Pri. School; Dindiyal I - K/G M. Ung; Dindiyal II - Pri. School; Danlako II - K/G Amine
Mashi	Karau	Garo I - K. G Magaji; Garo II - Pri. School; Bujeje I - Pri. School; Bujeje II - Pri. School; Sardawa I - K. G M/Ung; Sardawa II - K. G A. M. Gazau; Afanawa/Doka - Ung. Badole; Lango - K. G Mai Ung; Karau Shekeji - S/G Nashiro; Bula Arewa I - Pri. School; Bula Arewa II - Pri. School; Bula Kudu - K/G Danladi; Bula - S/G Bula; Waloji - K/G M. Ung; Tudu I - K/G Mai Ung Zubairu; Tudu II - K/G Mai Ung Zubairu; Mugun Dutse - Mai Ung Zubairu; Karau Badole - Afanawa; Karau Tsabre/F. Manda
Mashi	Tamilo 'A'	Tamilo Gabas - K/G Galadima; Tamilo Yamma - Pri. School; M/Fash I - K/G Mai Ung; M/Fash II - Sabon Gara; Saye Debe I - Pri. School; Saye Debe II - Pri. School; Guma I - Adult Centre; Guma II - Adult Centre; Guma III - K/G A. Yale; Tamilo I - Pri. School
Mashi	Tamilo 'B'	Bundi Jabe - K/G M/Ung.; Afadu Manawa - Pri. School; Afadu Doroyi - K/G A. Ila; Kilago - K/G M/Ung; Bunu-Bunu - K/G M/Ung; Dantankari - Pri. School; Dantankari Gabas - K/G M/Ung; Dantankari T/Zana M/Ung
Matazu	Matazu 'A	Court - Court Yard; Dispensary - Dispensary; Layin Gimba - Oepn Space; Shantalawa - Open Space; Mallawamawa - Open Space; Kasha Ruwa - Kasharuwa Pri. School; Guru - Gidan Babangida; Damachi - Gidan Maiung; Tabobi - Tabobi Pri. School; Ginchawa - Ginchawa Pri. School; Kwanar Jammani Open Space; Kofar Gidan Lawal Mainama
Matazu	Matazu 'B'	Matazu Gari - Model Pri. School; Kofar Gabas - Gindin Durumi; Kudawa - Gidan Mal Dahe; Yara - Open Space; Kwaf Daya - A. Ladan House; Galadima - Fagachi House; Bamaraba/Salihawa - Ibrahim House; Tsagawa - Tsagawa Pri. School; Dabawa - Maiung House; Mazoji Fulani - M/F Pri. School; Mahuta - Gindin Tsamiya; Matazu Gari/Matazu Model Pri. School; Kudu (Asibiti)
Matazu	Mazoji 'A'	Salihawa - Ward Head House; Ung. Galadima - Ung Tambai Pri. School; Yalwa - Maiung House; Buku - M/Ung House; Dugul - Dugul Pri. School; Papu - Papu Pri. School; Kakilawa - M/Ung. House; Gidan Dawa - Dandali Open Space; Maruji/Nasarawa - M/Ung House; Yalwa Gari I - Ward H. House; Ung. Ganye / Ung. Ganye (05)
Matazu	Mazoji 'B'	Mazoji Gari - Mazoji Pri. School; Barebari - Adul Educ. Class; Tsadawam - Tsadawa Pri. School; Ung. Danja/Musa I - Ung Danja Pri. School; Bokolo - Open Space; Runka - Near Market; Ung Danja/Musa II - Ung Danja Pri. School; Sabon Layi Open Space
Matazu	Sayaya	Sayaya Gari - S. Pri. School; Saura - Near M. Ung; Raddawa - Raddawa Pri. School; Kogon Maidawa - Pri. School; Shebau - M/Ung House; Karachi - M/Ung House; Rimigari - M/Ung House; Bakane - Bakane Pri. School; Zakin Baure - M/Ung House; Bauraji 'A' - Ward Head House; Tuga - Tuga Pri. School; Farin Tafki - Pri. School; Kagara Waje - G/Gwarzo Pri. School; Maharba - Pri. School; Ung Kaba - Ward H. House; Gangule - Open Space; Kagara Gari - Ward Head House; Bauraji 'A' Ward Head House; Ung. Kole / Ung. Kole
Matazu	Kogari	Kogari Gari - Kogari Pri. School; Ung. Galadima - Kan Dutse; Katun - Katun Pri. School; Ung Sarka- Pri. School; Tsakuwa/Sayya - Bakin Tafki; Daurawa - Fakon Mailalle; Fadumawa - Gurgu/Santa Ala; Kogari Gari II - Pri. School
Matazu	Gwarjo	Gwarjo Gari - Gwarjo Pri. School; Gidan Ima - Ward H. House; Ilali - Ilali Pri. School; Jinfin Nomau - M/Ung House; Gadi - Gadi Pei. School; Ung Tanimu - Ward H. House; Kofar Fada - T. V Room; Yar Unguwa - Ward H. House; Ung Iliya - Oepn Space; Gwarjo Gari / Open Space; Ilali/Bakin Yara
Matazu	Karaduwa	Karaduwa Gari - Karaduwa Pri. School; Kuka Waina - Pri. School; Ung. Alti - Near M/Ung House; Kagadama - Kagadama Pri. School; Yar Tsamiya - Yartsamiya Pri. School; Ung Maiyaji - M/Ung Pri. School; Nasarawa Yamma - Open Space; Karaduwa T. V - T. V Room; Doguwar Tsamiya - M/Ung House; Sabon Layi/Sabon Layi; Aduwa/ Open Space
Matazu	Dissi	Dissi Gari - Dissi Pri. School; Faras - Faras Pri. School; Ung Sukola - Danbanga Pri. School; Gidan Gwauro - Rumfar Boka; Jataka - T. V Room; Ringi Gora - Open Space; Shirashiri Open Space
Matazu	Rinjin Idi	Rinji Idi Gari - Pri. School; Sabon Gari - Adamu Pri. School; Karawo - Danwali; Jumawa - M/Ung House; Ung Bawa - Open Space; Gyazawa - Open Space
Musawa	Musawa	Musawa Gari I / Yero Pri. School; Garewa I - Yero Pri. School; Rugar Waje 'A'I - Usman Liman. Pri. School; Rugar Waje 'B' -I Usman Liman. Pri. School; Tsarika - Tsarika Pri. School; Rugar Kusa - Pri. School; Kuru - Kuru Pri. School; Gadanga - Near Mai Ungu. House; Faring-Dutse - F/Dutse Pri. School; Aljiyawa - Alijiyawa; Shira-Shiri - K/G Alh. Rabe; Musawa Gari II - Yero Pri. School; Garewa II - Yero Pri. School; Rugar Waje Aii - Usman Liman. Pri. School; Rugar Waje B' II - Usman Liman. Pri. School
Musawa	Jikamshi	Marmachi 'A' - Jikamshi Pri. School; Marmachi 'B' - Aduwa; Yarbori - Open Space Near Police Station; Dangaske / Pri. School; Malamawa - Malamawa Pri. School; Bakin Gandu / Open Space; Kofar-Fada I - K/Fada; Bargumawa - G/Gamji; Kofar Fada II - K/Fada
Musawa	Danjanku/Karachi	Tashar - Nababa - Dispensary; Dankado - Pri. School; Munta Gari-Munta Gari Pri. Sch; Danjanku I - Pri. School; Murta Garki - Murta Pri. School; Birawa - Dandali; Malikaji - K/Gidan Mai Ung; Karachi - Viewing Centre; Gidan Lumbo - K/Gidan M. Unguwa; Kanya Kanawa - K/Gidan M. Unguwa; Danjanku II / Pri. School
Musawa	Kira	Kira - Kira Pri School; Kakar - Pri. School; Daurawa - Pri. School; Ung. Zagi - Farwand Diso; Ganuwa - Dispensary; Yar Kanya - Dandali; Dorayi Tsamiya; Cikin Duwazu - Pri. School; Faras - Faras; S/Garin Kira - Dandali
Musawa	Yaradau/Tabanni	Tabanni I - Tabanni Pri. School; Gidan Darho - G/Darho Pri. School; Rinjin Badiso - Gidan Badiso; A'Awa / Dandali; Furogi - Dandali; Yar Radau - Pri. School; Daminawa - Pri. School; Kyankyani - K/Gidan M. Unguwa; Sabon Gida / Pri. School; Rinjin Samu - Dandali; Tabanni II / Tabanni Pri. School
Musawa	Tuge	Tuge I - Tuge Pri. School; Fenteka Zuri - Zuri Pri. School; Karo - Karo Pri. School; Danbassa / Walki - Walki (Durumi); Tsabe - Tsabe Pri. School; Fanteka - Fanteka Pri. School; Kakuni - Kakuni Pri School; Salihawa - Salihawa Pri. School; Tuge II - Tuge Pri. School
Musawa	Gingin	Yarsanta - Dandali; Ung. Zomo - Gidan Zomo; Shangalawa Dandali; Ung. Yaro Pri. School; Mangafi - Pri. School; Ung Liman Pri. School; Katsiro Pri. School; Ung. Sani M/Rogo - K/Gidan M/Ung; Yarkirigi - Pri. School
Musawa	Kurkujan 'A'	Kurkujan Gabas I / Kurkujan Pri. School; Faras - Faras Pri. School; Bachirawa - Bachirawa Pri. School; Kokana / Dandali; Jirada - Dandali; Kauyen Bango / Pri. School; Kurkujan Gabas II / Kurujan Pri. School
Musawa	Dangani	Bebadawa - Bebadawa - Pri. School; Kafin Barde - K/Gidan Mai Unguwa; Turawa - K/Gidan M. Unguwa; Kujama / K/Gidan Alh. Musa; Kofar-Fada - Adult Edu. Class; Bakam Pri. School; Yar'Aikau / Yar'Aikau Pri. School; Magarya - Tashar Alh. Rabe; Katoge - Madala Pri. School; Bambama - K/G Mai/Ung. Tanko
Musawa	Kurkujan 'B'	Karachi -Gabas I / Mararraba Pri. School; Yar'Danya - Yar'Danya; Ruga Fari 'A' / R/Fari Pri. School; Ruga Fari 'B' / R/Fari Pri. School; Fulalawa Pri. School; Tamfai / Kankwana; Karachi Gabas II / Mararba Pri. School
Rimi	Abukur	Tafidarawa I Pri. School; Tafidarawa II Tafidarawa; K/Gabas Jihi Yarcediya; Kofar Gabas Jihi K/Gabas Jihi II; Yan-Albasa Pri. School; Tasha T. V Centre; Kaukai Pri. School; Akasawa I Yarfage; Akasawa II Akarawa; Tsohuwar Kasuwa; Ruske Ruske Gari; Kadiyawa - Kadiyawa; Tafidarawa Pri. School III; K/Gabas Yar-Chediya Yar-Titi
Rimi	Majengobir	Malumfashi - Rijiya Mai Suminti; Majen Gobir I Pri. School; Majen Gobir II Pri. School; Karare I Karare; Karare II Karare; Magaji Magaji; Faduma - Faduma; Harda - Harda; Bardayya I B. Pri. School; Bardayya II B. Pri. School
Rimi	Remawa/Iyatawa	Fardami I Gidan Leko; Fardami II Gidan Iliya; Bujawa G/Kalla House; Yar-Nabaya G/Gambo; Jobawa - Jobawa; Gemawa Pri. School; Bujawa Pri. School; Beguwa Beguwa; Sabon-Layi - Sabon Layi; Zangon Kanya Pri. School; Un-Liman Ung. Liman; Haraba - Haraba; K/Kudu -K/Kudu; Taka Tsimi Pri. School I; Taka Tsimi Pri. School II; Galadinchi - Galadinchi; Arawa - Arawa; Kuntawa - Kuntawa; Bararafa - Bararafa
Rimi	Sabon Garin/Alarain	Bujuwa Shehu - Bujuwa Shehu Shehu; Dogara - Dogara; Ung-Malamai Pri. School; Gobirawa - Gobirawa; Ung Rimji - Ung Rimji; K/Gabas Fada - Fada; Domawa - Domawa; Gungu - Gungu; Nasarawa - Nasarawa; Katakam - Katakam; Jihi Gari; Renawa Gari; Ilgaram Gagram; Tashar Zakara By Station; Eka T. V Centre; K/Fada Gabas Fada
Rimi	Tsagero	Tsagero East Pri. School; Tsagero Gari Pri. School; Tsagero West Pri. School; Yanbakabiya - Yan Bakabiya; Madunka East - Maduka East; Madunka Jamaa Maduka E.; Madunka Ibilawa - Madunka Ibilawa; Mallamawa - Mallamawa; Turaji - Pri. School; Kaddaji - Kadaji; Sabon-Gari Tsagero Pri. Sch.
Rimi	Fardami	Bai Pri. School; Fardami - Fardami Pri. School; Yan-Abu Yan-Abu; Gunki - Gunki; Yakasai - Yakasai; Makwalla - Makwalla; Tokawa - Tokawa
Rimi	Makurda	Makurda I - Makurda; Makurda II - Makurda Pri. School; Makurda III - Makurda Pri. School; Kadadda - Dadadda; Sabin Magama Pri. School; Kurima - Kurima; Dabganya - Dabaganya; Dagabawa - Dagabawa; Watsa/Karakanzan - Watsa; Faruwa - Faruwa; Fandare - Fandare; Makurda-Makurda
Rimi	Masabo/Kurabau	Dunkunna - Dunkuna; Kwatarni - Kwatarni; Masabo I Pri. School; Masabo II Masabo; Kwatarni Abu - K. Abu; Jarkuka Ande J. Ande; Jarkuka Gide J. Gide; Gajerar - Giwa Pri. Sch.; Kurabau Pri. School; Gangara - Gangara; Karkara Pri. School; Makada Kamadi; Karare Pri. School; Yitta Dankudafa Pri. School; Rimin Guza Pri. School; Mayawa - Mayawa; Masabo Pri. Sch.; Masabo - P/S
Sabuwa	Sabuwa 'A'	Sabuwa/Pri. School I; Sabuwa A. II; Awala /K/G Dan Mallam; Unguwar Malatsi/Dispensary; Unguwar Garba/Kgidan Garba; Unguwar Musa/Kg. Musa Baro; Unguwar Garba K/G. Mai Ung. Karimu
Sabuwa	Sabuwa 'B'	Unguwar Amiwasa/Kg Isa; Unguwar Dayyabu/Kg/Dayyabu; Mazare/Kg/Maiunguwa Lawal; Sabuwa II/K/G Mai Unguwa Rashidu; Sabuwar Unguwa/Kg Bako; Unguwar Iya/Kg Iyansabuwa
Sabuwa	Gazari	Gazari/Pri. School; Rafinfa/Kg Nadaya; Unguwar Zubairu/Kg Zubairu; Inono/Pri. School; Yarkaka/Dispensary; Hayin Makera/Kg Mai Ung Shehu
Sabuwa	Maibakko	Mai Bakko/Pri. School; Unguwa Isau/Mai Bakko Pri. School; Unguwa Hassan /Kg Maiunguwa Hassan; Unguwar Bako/Pri. School; Unguwar Sani/Kg Mai Unguwa Hassan; Yarlagwada/Pri. School; Marmarar Bako/Kg Maiunguwa; Kayya/Kg Haruna Kayya
Sabuwa	Damari	Unguwar Garba/Kg Garba; Unguwar Dankwari/Kg Alh. Goma; Unguwar Iliya/Kg Iliya; Unguwar Yahaya/Kg Yahaya; Unguwar Hamza/Kg Hamza; Unguwar Sabiu/Kg Sabi'U; Unguwar Alh. Dabo/Kg. Alh Dabo; Unguwar Goga; Unguwar Mahauta - Pri. School; Unguwar Hamida - Pri. School; Damari Gari I / Open Space; Damari Gari II / Open Space
Sabuwa	Dugun Mu'Azu	Dungun Mu'Azu/Pri. School; Mayaki I/Kg. Kadisan; Kabalawa; Bakin Dugu/Kg Makada; Maiyaki /Kg Sarkin Noma Nayaya; Gawawa; Nagarari/Pri. School; Yadi/Kg Maikudi; Dungun Muazu 'A'/Kg Nahendo
Sabuwa	Gamji	Gamji/Pri. School; Gobirawa/Kg Alh. Naggwaggo; Unguwar. S/Dawa; Unguwar Sarkin Dama/K/G. Maiung. Abdu; Albasu/Pri. School
Sabuwa	Rafin Iwa	Rafin-Iwa/Kg. Wakili Usman; Unguwar Tukur/Kg. Sarkin Fawa; Unguwar Bardaga/Kg. Bawa; Ung. Labi/Kofar Gidan Yahaya Doka; Unguwar Maichaki/Kg. Tambaya Kaura
Sabuwa	Sayau	Sayau I/Kg Bawa Wakili; Unguwar Nakaba/Kg. Danlami; Sayau II/Kg Mamman Gona; Maikasuwa/Kg Mai. Unguwa Isiyaka; Unguwar Sarkin Noma/Kg. M. Ung. Abdu; Unguwa Idi/Kg Mai Unguwa Idi
Safana	Tsaskiya	Zabuwa /K. G Mai-Unguwa; Dannagaiya/Pri. School; Baude/Baude Pri. School.; Ung. Aisha/Yara-Ung. Aisha; Tudun Dole/T. Dole; Tsaskiya A /Fuloti; Tsaskiya B /Tsaskiya; Tsaskiya C /Yara-Tsaskiya; Tawanka/Tawanka; Dagarawa/Pri. School; Karafa/Karafa; Baruwa/Baruwa Tsaskiya; Karfa/Karfa
Safana	Runka 'A'	Sallubawa/S. Pri. School; Habul/Yara; Kunkunna A/K. Pri. School; Guzurawa A./Yara; Guzurawa B./Alhazawa; Guzurawa C./T. V Centre; Runka Ung Sabo/Pri. School; Runka Ung Tambayo, Zamfarawa/Dispensary; Runka Ung. Gambo Zamfarawa; Clinic/Clinic; Eledoka/Yargwanki/Yara; Gobirawa/Gobirawa; Kunkunna B/Kunkunna; Guzurawa D. /Yara
Safana	Babban Duhu 'A'	Kuka Rabo A/K. G Mai-Unguwa; Kuka Rabo B /K. G Mai-Unguwa; Madaddabai/Madaddbai; Unguwar Mai Ulu/Unguwar Mai Ulu; Babban Duhu Gari/Pri. School; Babban Duhu Ung Tinau/Ung. Tinau; Babban Duhu Ung, Yahaya/Ung. Yahaya; Bare. Bari A/Pri. School; Bare. Bari B /Pri. School; Bare. Bari C /Gobirawa; Bare. Bari D /Hayin Nuhu; Unguwar Rima/Unguwar Rima; S/Garin Turawa/Turawa; Babban Duhu TV Centre /T. V Centre
Safana	Babban Duhu 'B'	Garin Masau/Yara; Dakya / Dakya; Kukar Samu/Dispensary; Bukarawa/Walawa I; Bukarawa/Walawa II; Yan-Ukku/Yara; Kirtawa A/Ung. Mai-Unguwa; Kirtawa B/Unguwa Fage; Kinfau A /Ung. Mai-Unguwa; Kinfau B /K. G Mai Unguwa Ila; Muniya A/T. V Centre; Muniya B/T. V Centre; U/S/Fulani Malabu/Malabu; Sabon Gari/Babbar Yara
Safana	Runka 'B'	Ganuwa/Pri. School; Yar-Lilo A/Dispensary; Yar-Lilo B/Sako; Maikada/Pri. School; Unguwar Faida U. S/Unguwar Faida; Gora A /Pri. School; Gora B /T. V Centre; Gora C /Unguwar Ukku; G/Magaji Gangare/Pri. School; Ung. Maiadar, G. Beguwa/Adarawa; Makanwachi/Pri. School; Babban Baki/Babban Baki
Safana	Zakka 'A'	Dogon-Marke/K. G Mai Dogon Marke; Kwandawa/Yar'Ukku; Takatsaba/Pri. School; Yauni/Yauni; Zakka 'A' /K. G. M; Zakka B. kg Bello; Zakka C/Dangaru/Pri. School; 'Kauyen Bakwai/Yara; Turkunawa/Yarcediya; Zakka, Dangaru/Pri. School
Safana	Zakka 'B'	Kwayawa/T. V Centre; Bada. Bada; Ummadau/Yara; K. Tsamiya/Tsamiya; Gulbindima / G / Dimma; Kartakawa/K. G Mai-Unguwa; Dan-Awo/K. G Mai-Unguwa; Mahuta/Mahuta; Dan-Zaki/K. G M/Un. Dan-Zaki
Safana	Baure 'A'	Baure/Pri. School; Baure B /Dispensary; Danjikko A /Pri. School; Danjikko B /Pri. School; Garin Waziri/Pri. School; Sabon Garin Baure/Tree Shade; Ginjimi/Pri. School; Salihawar Kalgo A/Pri. Salihawa; Salihawar Kalgo B/Tree Shade; Salihawar Kalgo C/Mabir Kida; Salihawar Haki/K. G Mai-Unguwa
Safana	Baure 'B'	Garin Tambari/Garin Tambari; Marina A /Dispensary; Marina B /Near Marina; Illela A /Illela; Illela B /Yara; Yalbi/Yalbi; Haukan Zamma/Haukan Zama; Rubu/Rubu; Dagwarawa/Dagwarawa
Sandamu	Sandamu	Luggai/Pri. School; Lugga II /K/Maigari; Sandamu Waziri / Kofar Waziri; Sandamu Matti / Adult Edcu. Class; Sandamu Sule I / Sandamu II Pri. School; Sandamu Bawa I / Sandamu I Pri. School; Sandamu Bawai I / Chikura Islammiya School; Yadaganmu/B/Rijiya; Daka I / Pri. School; Daka II / D/Karatu; Daka III / Kofar Mai Gari; Duku -Duku I/Open Space; Daku-Daku II/Pri. School; 'sandamu Sule II/Pri. School; 'sandamu Waziri II / Viewing Centre
Sandamu	Karkarku	Maye I/B/Rijiya; Maye II/G/Ma'azu; Karkarku I /Pri. School; Karkarku II /Pri. School; Karkarku III /Islamiyya; Karkarku IV/Open Space; Karkarku V/Pri. School
Sandamu	Kwasarawa	Ingawa/K/Ilu; Dan Gau I/Pri. School; Dan Gau II/Pri. School; Kokofi/Pri. School; Kwasarawa Halilu/Pri. School; Kwasarawa Wakili/Pri. School; Kwasarawa Ya'U/B/Tafki; Fatau Tawa I/B/Rijiya; Fatau Tawa II/K/Atiku; Gudau/K/G. M/Ung
Sandamu	Daneji 'A'	Rijiyar Tsamiya I/Pri. School; Rijiyar Tsamiya II/K. G. M/Ung; Rijiyar Tsamiyaiii/K. G. M/Ung; Jarkuka I/K. G. M/Ung; Jarkua II/K. G. M/Ung; Babatawa I/S/Garin Baba Lai; Babatawaii/S/Garin Baba Lai; Bela I/K/G. M/Ung; Bela II/Yammacin Bela; Jarkuka III/K. G. M/Ung
Sandamu	Daneji 'B'	Majiyawa I/K/G. M/Ung; Majiyawaii / Viewing Centre; Ruma Sanda/Pri. School; Ruma Amadu/K/Maigari; Ruma Abdulkarim/K/G/M/Ung.; Daneji I/Pri. School; Daneji II/K/G. M/Ung
Sandamu	Fago 'A'	Fago U/Gamji I/Pri. School; Fago U/Gamji II /K/G/ M/Ung; Fago S/Fegi I / K/Kanta; Fago S/Fegi II / K/ Sani Makana; Fago Guga / K / Tela Ali; Fago Guga II / Pri. School; Fagon Fulani / Kankara; Yankawada Habe I /K/G M/Ung. Yakubu; Yankawada Habe II /Pri. School; Yakawada Fulani I / Pri. School; Yakawada Fulani II / K/Gidan Hardo; Fago U/Gamji III / K/G M/Ung
Sandamu	Fago 'B'	Kayarda I/K/Sarkin Fulani; Kayarda II/K/Gian Bala; Tsadoji I/K/G. M/Ung; Tsadoji II/K/Gidan Gille; Gumzu I/K/Bakin Rijiya; Gumzu II/G/ Hardo Bawa; Kaibaki I /Pri. School; Kaibaki II/ Bakin Masalachi; Juwale I/Pri. School; Juwale II/Pri. School; Gazori I/Pri. School; Gazori II/ Hardo Ishiaku; Kwadage I/Pri. School; Kwadage II/Open Space; Zugai/Pri. School
Sandamu	Rade 'A'	Rade Gari I/Pri. School; Rade Gari II/ Bakin Masallachi; Yanmanuwa I/Pri. School; Yanmanuwa II/Fadi Gurje; Lemu I/ Gumba; Lemu II/Pri. School; Gundu Lemu/K/G M/Ung; Gundu Habe/K/Mai Ung.; Tuntsaye/K/Mai Gari; Rade Gari III/Pri. School
Sandamu	Rade 'B'	Jiba I/K/Maigaari; Jiba II/Open Space; S/Garin Burta I/K/G M/Ung; S/Garin Burta II/K/G M/Ung; Makauraci I/Pri. School; Makauraci II/K/Maigari; Burta I/Pri. School; Burta II/ Kofar Mai Gari; Gargarawa I/K/Maigari; Gargarawa II/Open Space; Ruwan Dutsi/ Primary School; Nafarga/K/G/M/Ung
Sandamu	Katsayal	Katsayal Bako I/ Kofar Fada; Katsayal Bako II/Pri. School; Katsayal Abdu I/ Sarawa; Katsayal Abdu II / Koki; Katsayal Shu'Aibu I/Pr. School; Katsayal Yasai II/K/Open Space; Katsayal Yasai II/K/Yassai; Katsayai Yasi III/ Kofar Sarki Gabas; Dotarga/K/G. M/Ung; Katsayai Bako III/Open Space; Katsayai Abdu III/Pri. School; Katsayai Shu'Aibu II/Pri. School
Sandamu	Kagare	Kawari/Mahadar Hanya; Dinau I/K/Sarkin Fada; Dinau II/K/Sarkin Fada; Kagare Fulani K/G/ S. Fulani; Kagare Fulani II/K/G. M./Ung; Kagare Fulani III/K/G/ Sa'Idu; Kagare Habe I/Pri. School; Kagare Habe II/ Kofar Sarkin Gabas
Zango	Yardaje	Yardaje I / Pri. School; Yardaje II / Pri. School; Yardaje III / Pri. School; Yardaje III / Kofar Maigari; Yardaje / Galadima Kofar Maigari; Dishe I / Pri. School; Dishe II / Kofar Maigari; Jawo Lili / Kofar Maigari; Bulun Gudu / Kofar Maigari; Gadawo / Kofar Maigari
Zango	Kanda	Kanda - Primary School I; Kanda - Primary School II; Maizabo Idi - Kofar Maigari; Kututture - Primary School I; Kututture - Primary School II
Zango	Dargage	Aduwawa / Arusa Gidin Gawo; Ishiyawa / Kofar Maigari I; Ishiyawa / Kofar Maigari II; Dargage / Kofar Maigari; Kwajali Kofar Maigari; Rindi Bakin Titi; Fiyun Kofar Maigari; Barage I Pri. School; Barage II Kofar Maigari; Yandaka Kofar Maigari
Zango	Rogogo/Cidari	Ung. Gaje I K/Maigari; Ung. Gaje II K/Maigari; Rogogo Cidari I Pri. School; Rogogo Cidari II K/Maigari; Rogogo Masabka/Gabas Pri. School I; Rogogo Masabka/Gabas Pri. School II; Cidari K/Maigari; Arautake Musa Bakin Masalaci; Arautake Kullu Bakin Masallaci
Zango	Garni	Madaka I Pri. School; Madaka II Pri. School; D/Malam I Pri. School; D/Malam II Pri. School; Makiyawa I Kofar Maigari; Makiyawa II Kofar Maigari; Toka Bura Kofar Maigari; Garni Habe Kofar Maigari; Garni Fulani Kofar Maigari; Da Ali Kofar Maigari; Kasuwayal Kofar Maigari; Badake Kofar Maigari
Zango	Kawarin Kudi	Kwarin Kudi I T. V Centre; Kwarin Kudi II T. V. Centre; Kwarin Kudi III Kofar Dagali; Kwarin Kudi; Damaski Kofar Dagaci; Kyaukyawa Kofar Dagaci; Bugajen K/Kudi Kofar Dagaci; Rijiyar Mata Kofar Dagaci; Ruwa Kasa Bakin Massalaci; Gidila Kofar Maigari; Baragumi/Habe/Fulani Kg Maigari
Zango	Kawarin Malawamai	Bidawa Yantuba / Pri. School; Bidawa Habe / Fulani Kofar Maigari; K/Malamai / Pri. School; Sarkin Dab / Kofar Maigari; Bugaje G/Usman Kofar Maigari
