= Village =

Human settlement smaller than a town

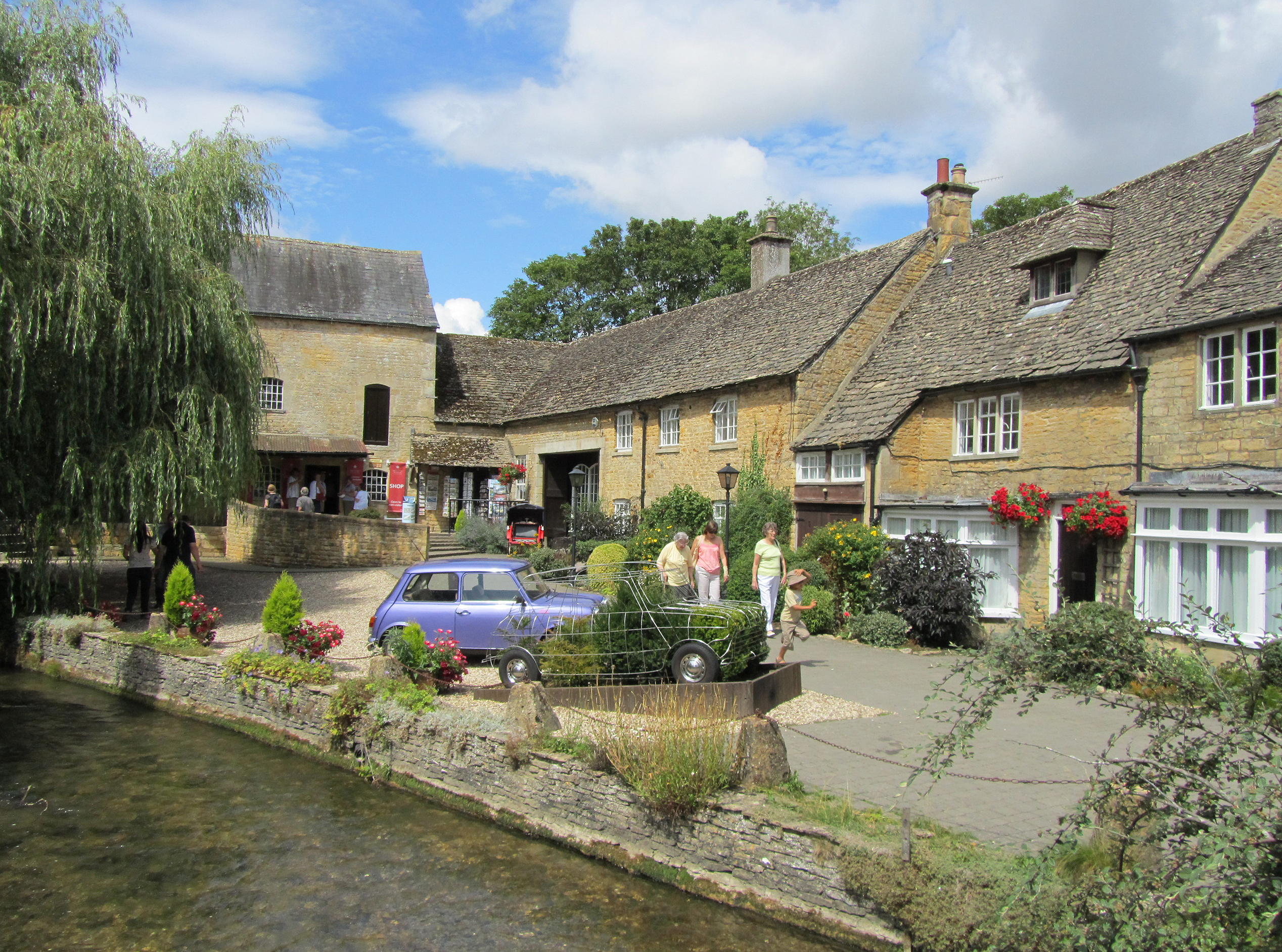
Bourton-on-the-Water, a village in England.

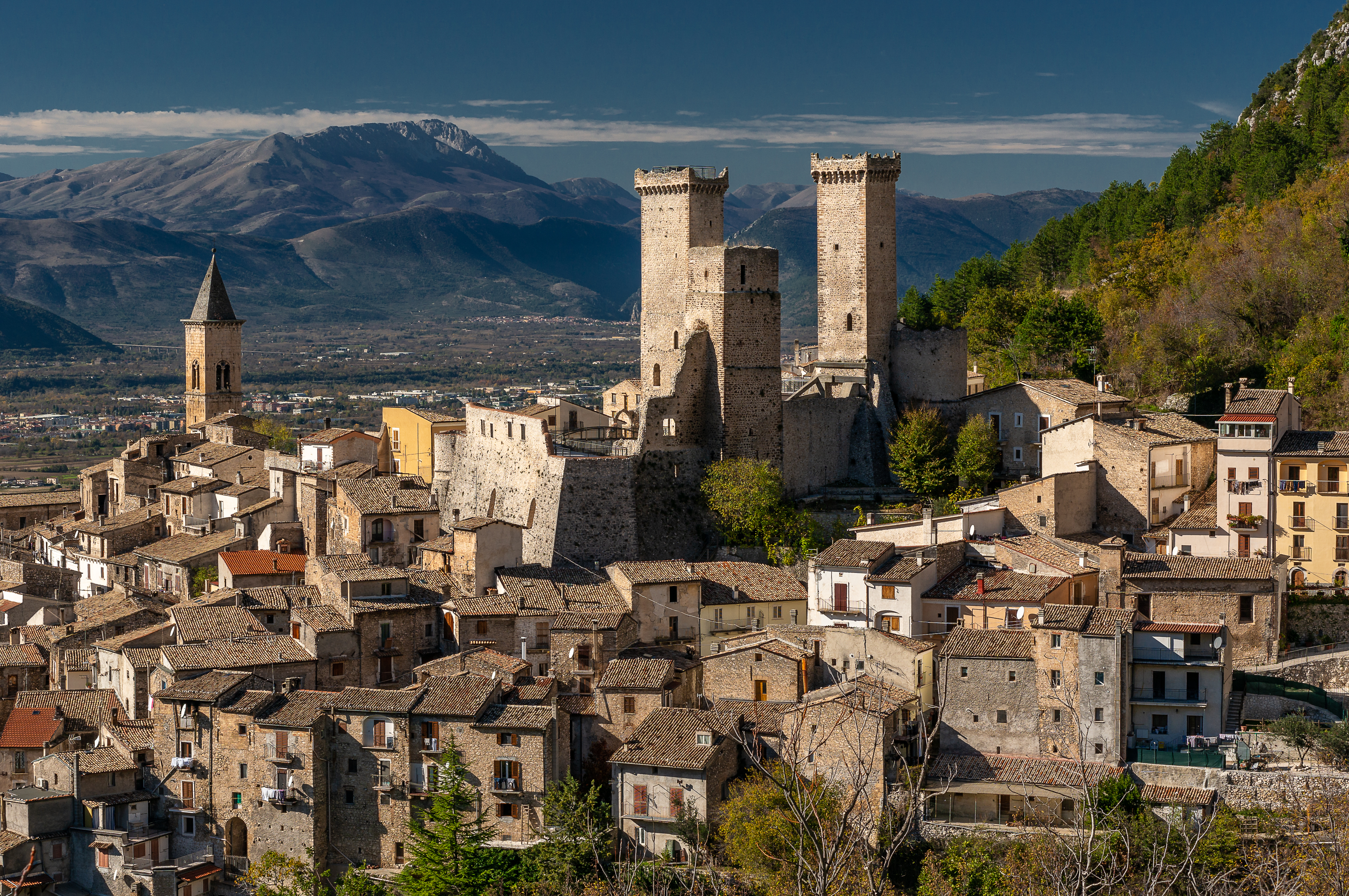
Pacentro, Italy

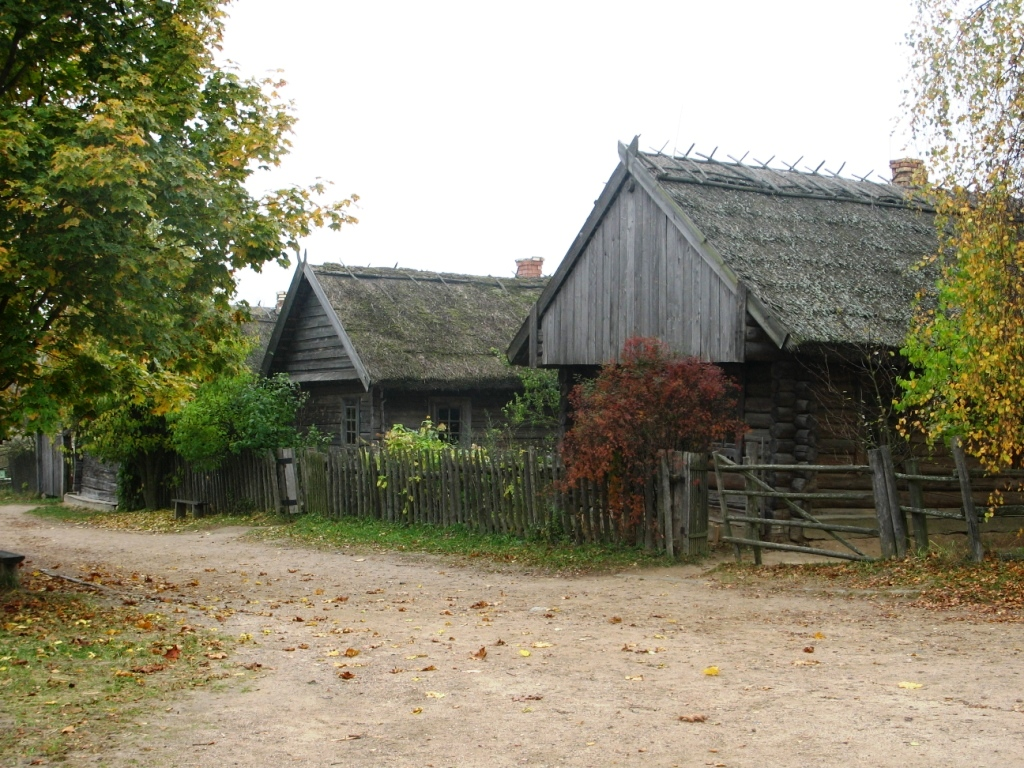
Strochitsy, Belarus, pictured 2008

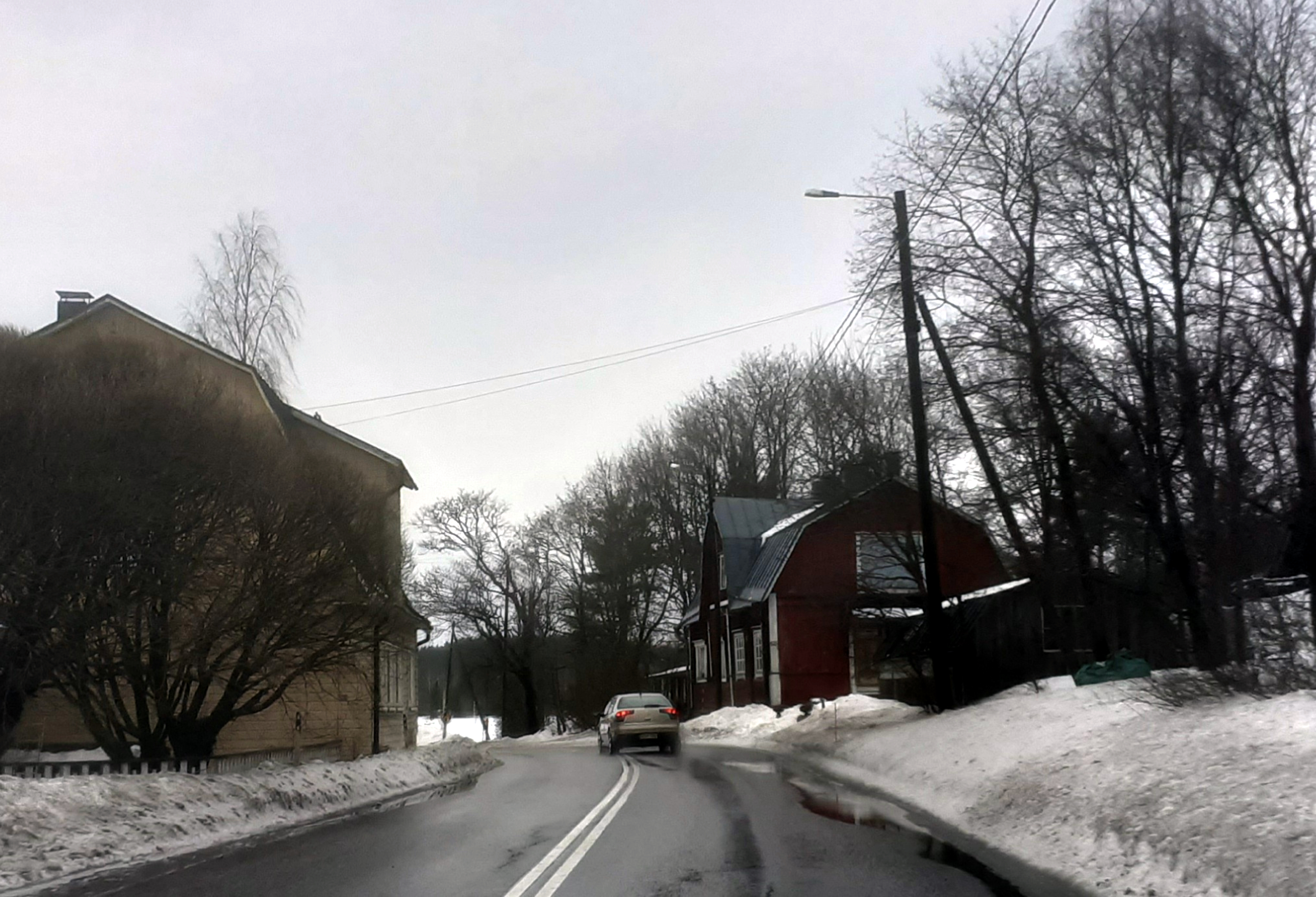
Pornainen, Finland

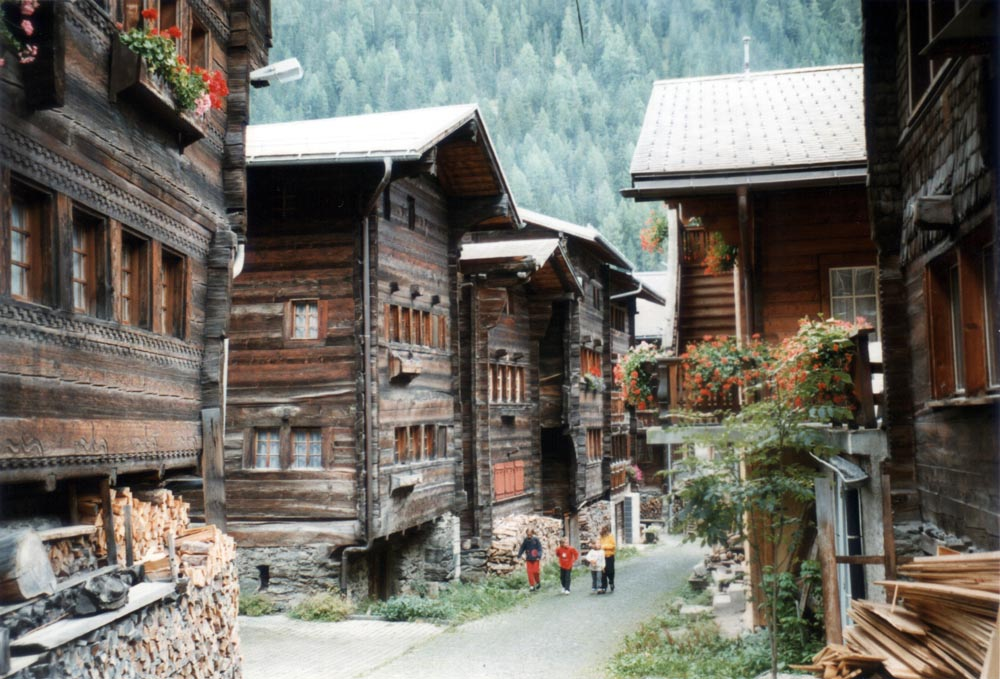
An Alpine village in the Lötschental valley, Switzerland

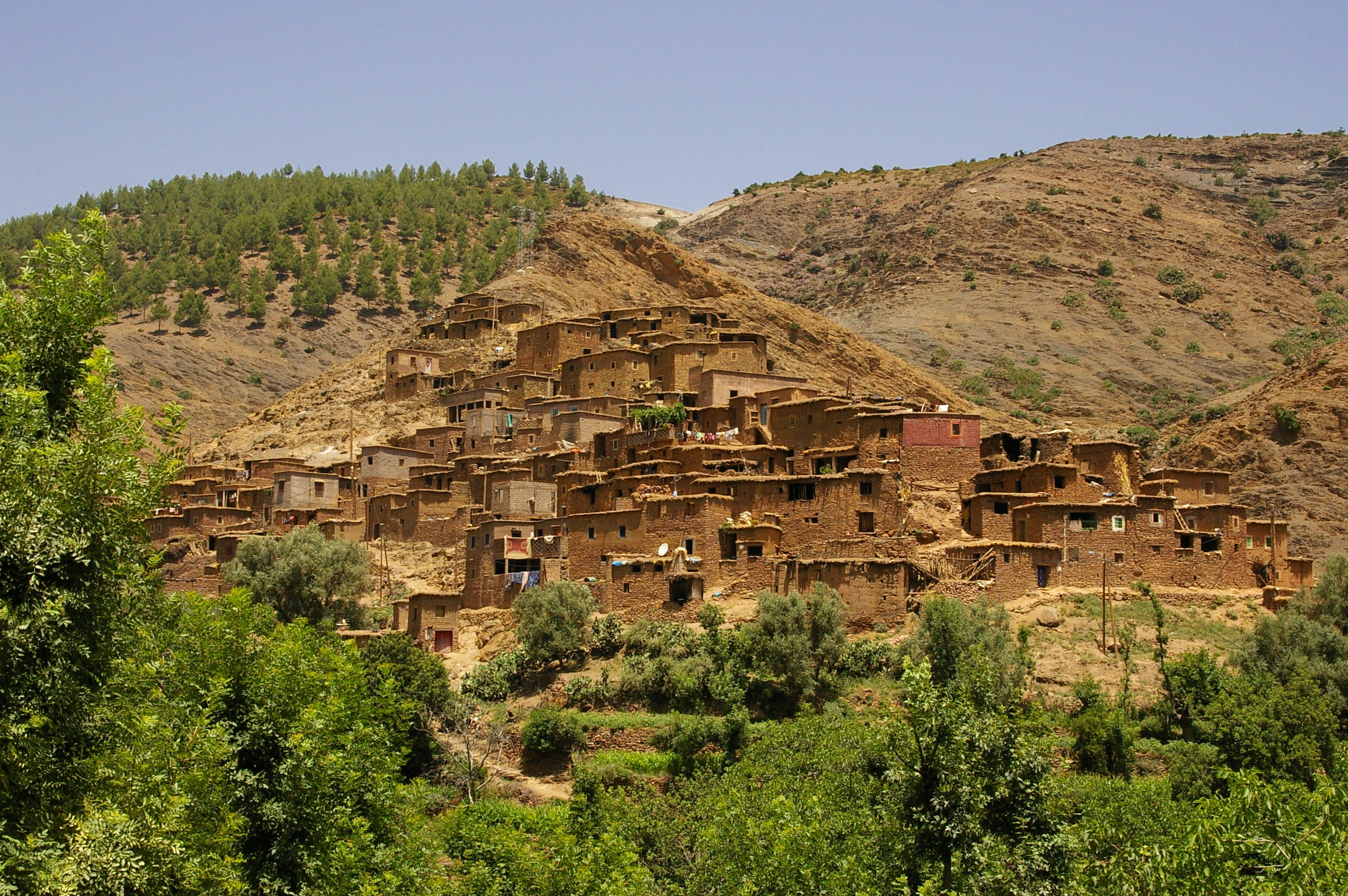
A Berber village in Ourika valley, High Atlas, Morocco

A village is a human settlement or a residential community, larger than a hamlet but smaller than a town; some geographers describe villages as having between 500 and 2,500 inhabitants. Although villages are often located in rural areas, the term urban village is also applied to certain urban neighborhoods. Villages are normally permanent, with fixed dwellings, however, transient villages also exist. Further, the dwellings of a village are fairly close to one another, not scattered broadly over the landscape, as a dispersed settlement.

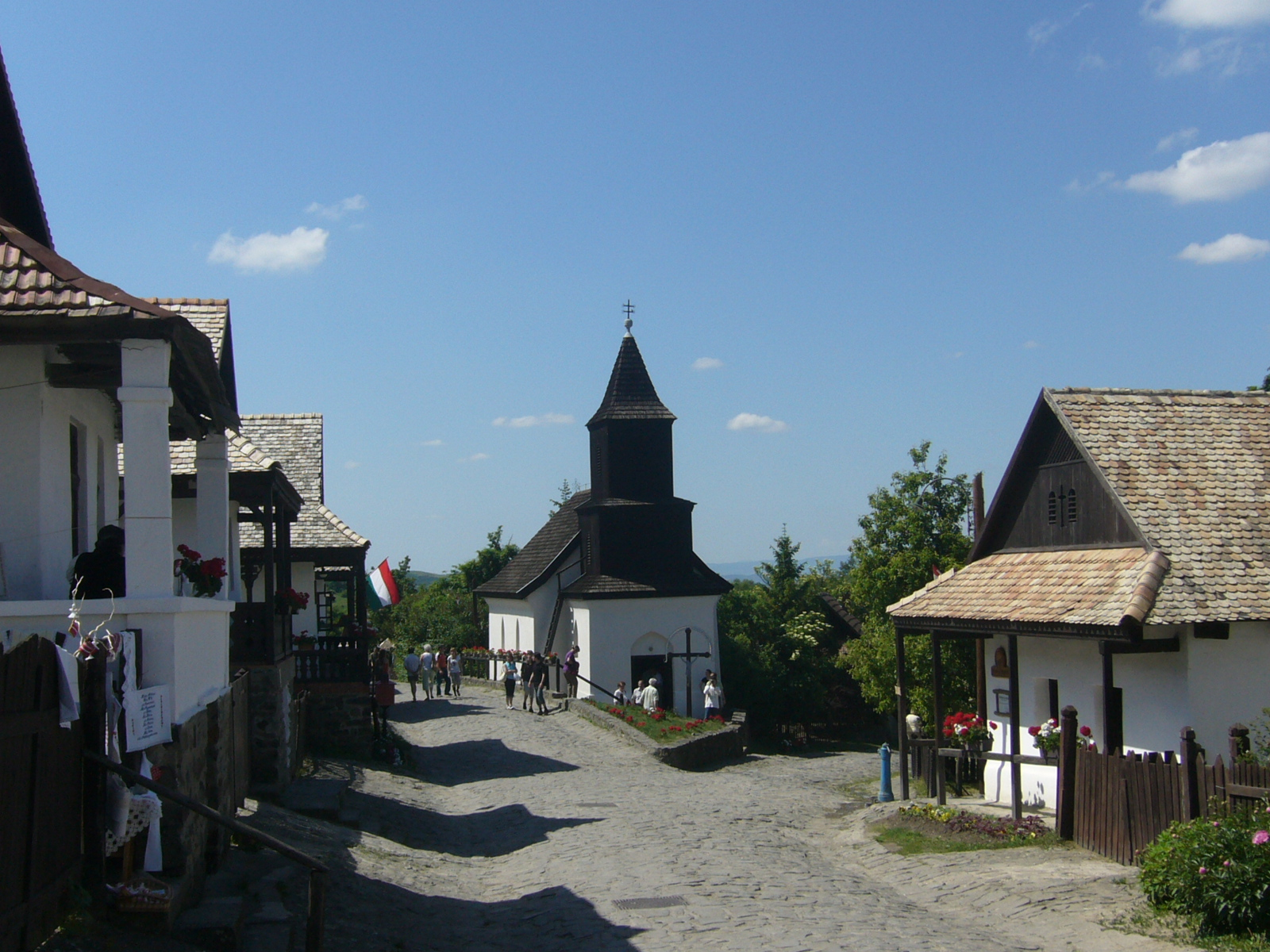
The old village of Hollókő, Nógrád, Hungary (UNESCO World Heritage Site)

In the past, villages were a usual form of community for societies that practiced subsistence agriculture and also for some non-agricultural societies. In Great Britain, a hamlet earned the right to be called a village when it built a church. In many cultures, towns and cities were few, with only a small proportion of the population living in them. The Industrial Revolution attracted people in larger numbers to work in mills and factories; the concentration of people caused many villages to grow into towns and cities. This also enabled specialization of labor and crafts and the development of many trades. The trend of urbanization continues but not always in connection with industrialization. Historically, homes were situated together for sociability and defence, and land surrounding the living quarters was farmed. Traditional fishing villages were based on artisan fishing and located adjacent to fishing grounds.

In toponomastic terminology, the names of individual villages are called Comonyms (from Ancient Greek κώμη / village and ὄνυμα / name, [cf. ὄνομα]).

== Etymology ==
From Middle English village, from Old French village, from Latin villāticus, ultimately from Latin villa (English villa).

== Central Asia and the Indian Subcontinent ==
=== Afghanistan ===
In Afghanistan, the village, or deh (Dari/Pashto: ده) is a mid-size settlement type in Afghan society, trumping the United States hamlet or qala (Dari: قلعه, Pashto: کلي), though smaller than the town, or shār (Dari: شهر, Pashto: ښار). In contrast to the qala, the deh is generally a bigger settlement which includes a commercial area, while the yet larger shār includes governmental buildings and services such as schools of higher education, basic health care, police stations etc.

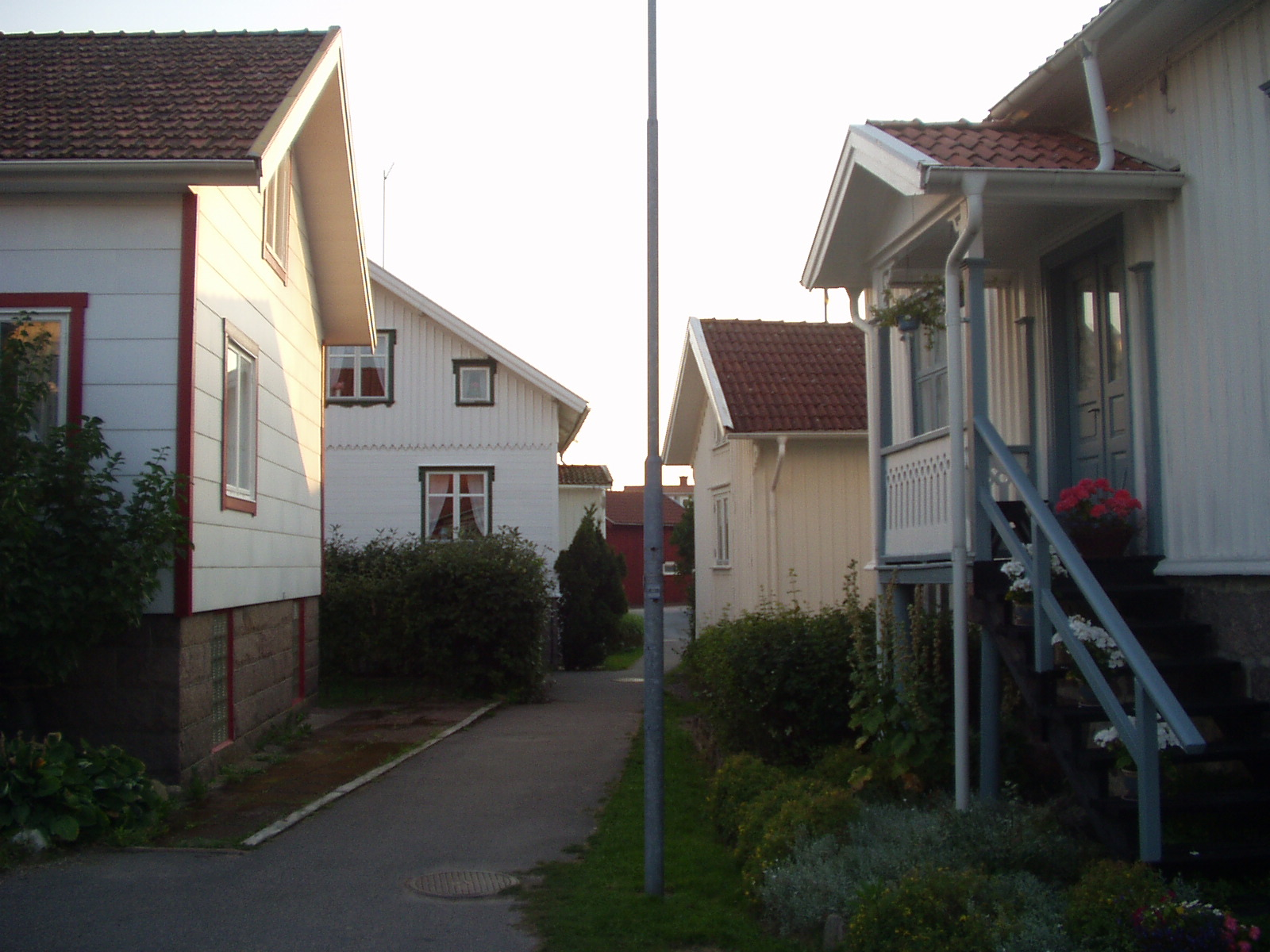
Mollösund, an example of a common village in Sweden and the Nordics.

=== India ===
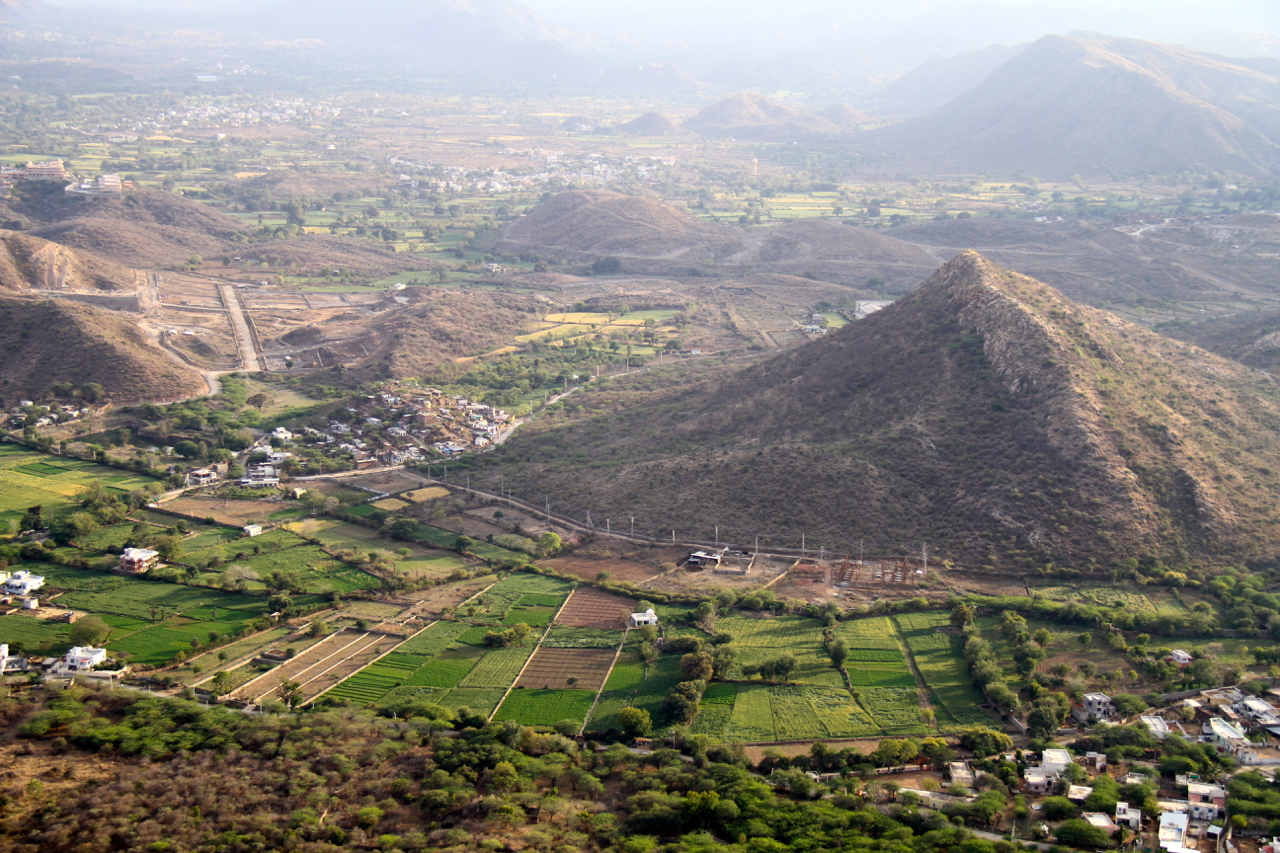
A typical rural peasant Indian village in Rajasthan, India

"The soul of India lives in its villages," declared Mahatma Gandhi at the beginning of 20th century. According to the 2011 census of India, 69% of Indians (around 833 million people) live in villages. Per the 2011 census of India, there were a total of 649,481 villages in India. The size of these villages varies considerably. 236,004 Indian villages have a population of fewer than 500, while 3,976 villages have a population of 10,000+. Most of the villages have their own temple, mosque, or church, or two and more than two of the above depending on the local religious following.

=== Pakistan ===
The majority of Pakistanis live in rural areas. According to the 2023 census, about 61% of the Pakistani population lives in rural areas. Most rural areas in Pakistan tend to be near cities, and are peri-urban areas. This is due to the definition of a rural area in Pakistan being an area that does not fall within an urban boundary. A village is called deh or gaaon in Urdu. Pakistani village life is marked by kinship and exchange relations.

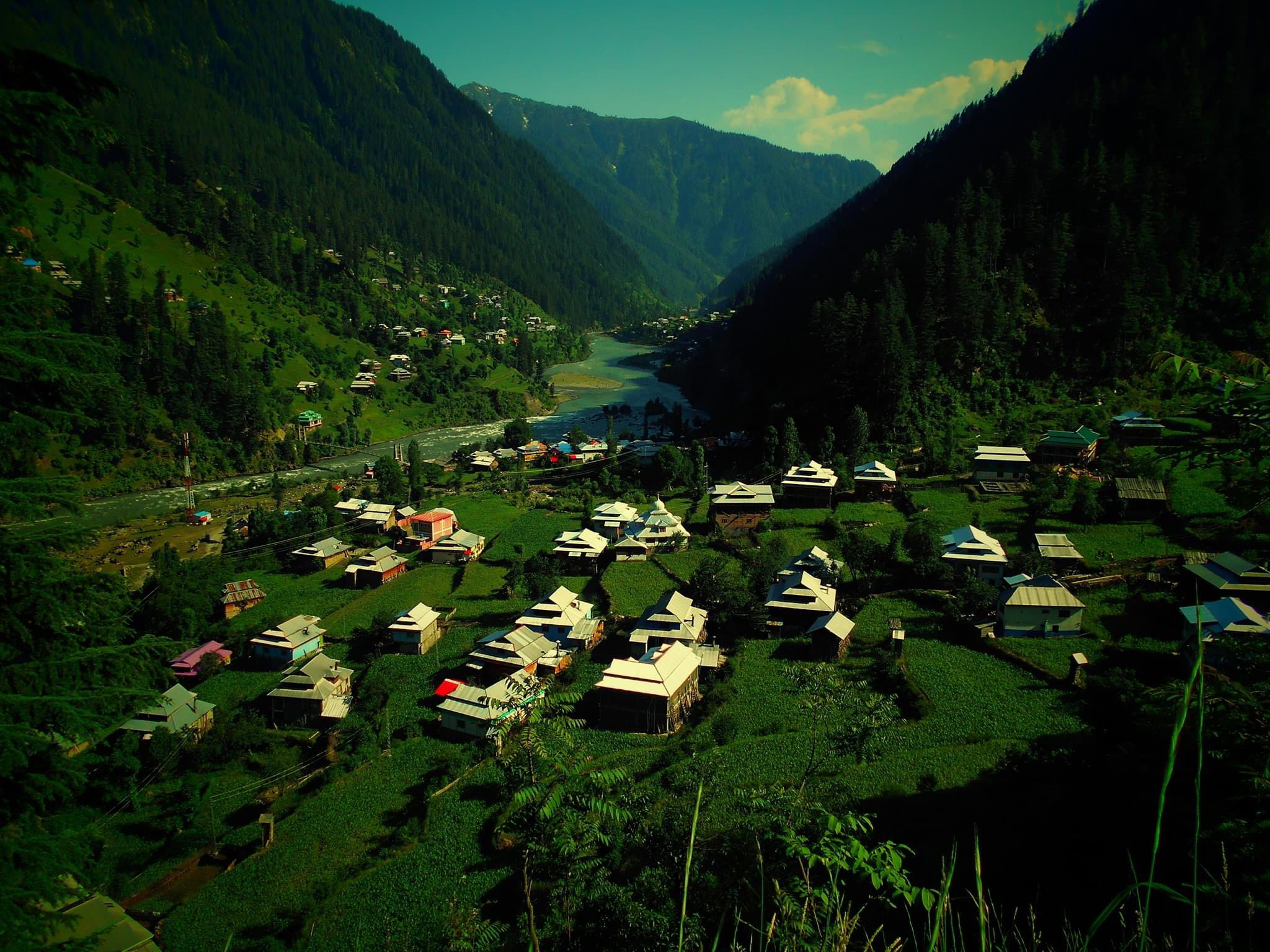
A village in Pakistani Kashmir's Neelum Valley "Dosut"

=== Kazakhstan ===
Auyl (Kazakh: Ауыл) is a Kazakh word meaning "village" in Kazakhstan. According to the 2009 census of Kazakhstan, 42.7% of Kazakhstani citizens (7.5 million people) live in 8172 different villages. To refer to this concept along with the word "auyl" often used the Slavic word "selo" in Northern Kazakhstan.

== East Asia ==
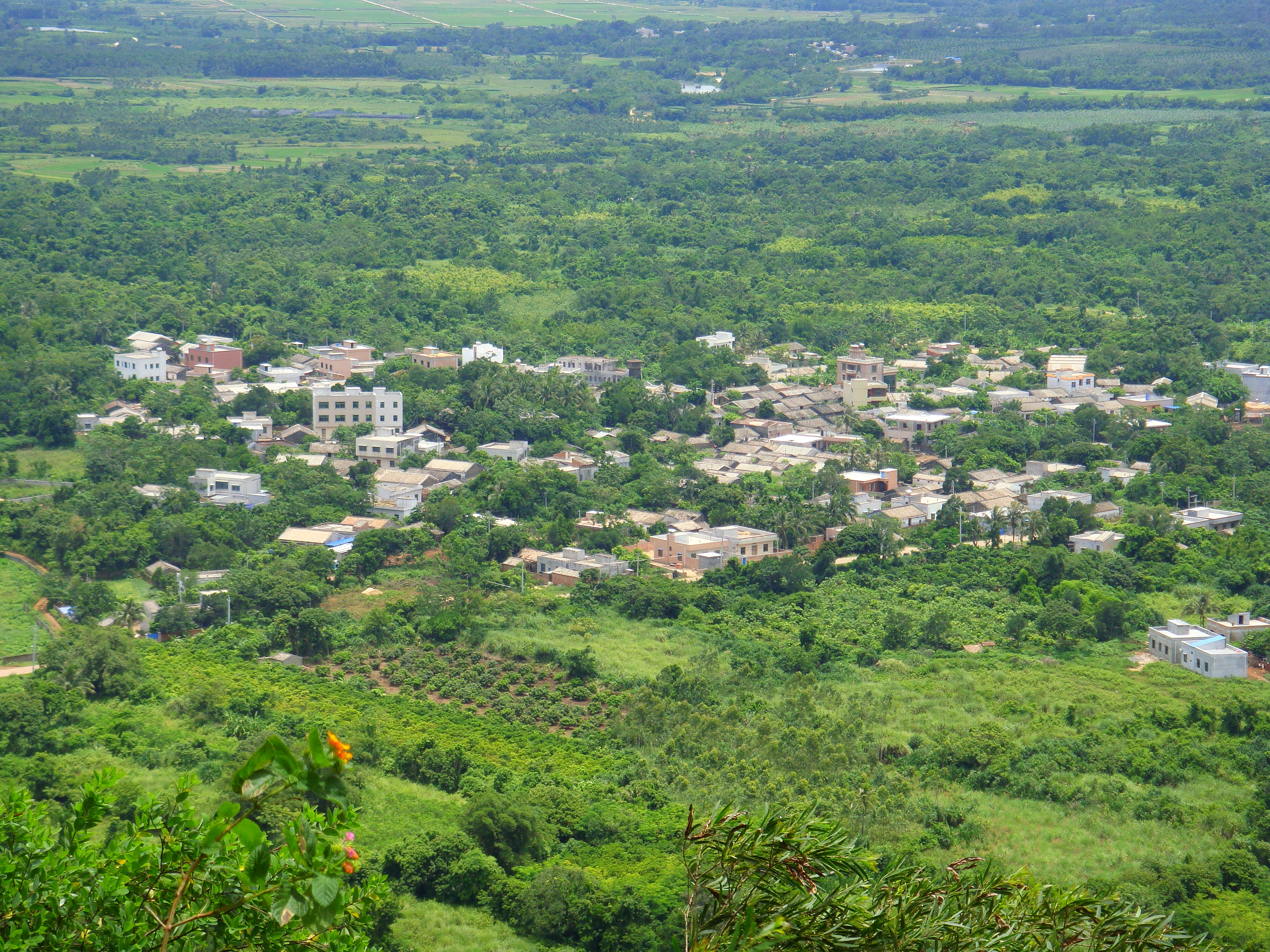
A typical small village in Hainan, China

=== China ===
In mainland China, villages are divisions under townships or towns.

=== Taiwan ===
In the Republic of China (Taiwan), villages are divisions under townships or county-administered cities. The village is called a tsuen or cūn (村) under a rural township (鄉) and a li (里) under an urban township (鎮) or a county-controlled city. See also Li (unit).

=== Japan ===
Shirakawa-gō, Gifu, Japan

Villages in Japan are considered as local public bodies and subdivisions of rural districts. There are currently 183 recorded villages, but due to merging and status elevation, this number is decreasing.

== Southeast Asia ==
=== Malay Archipelago ===
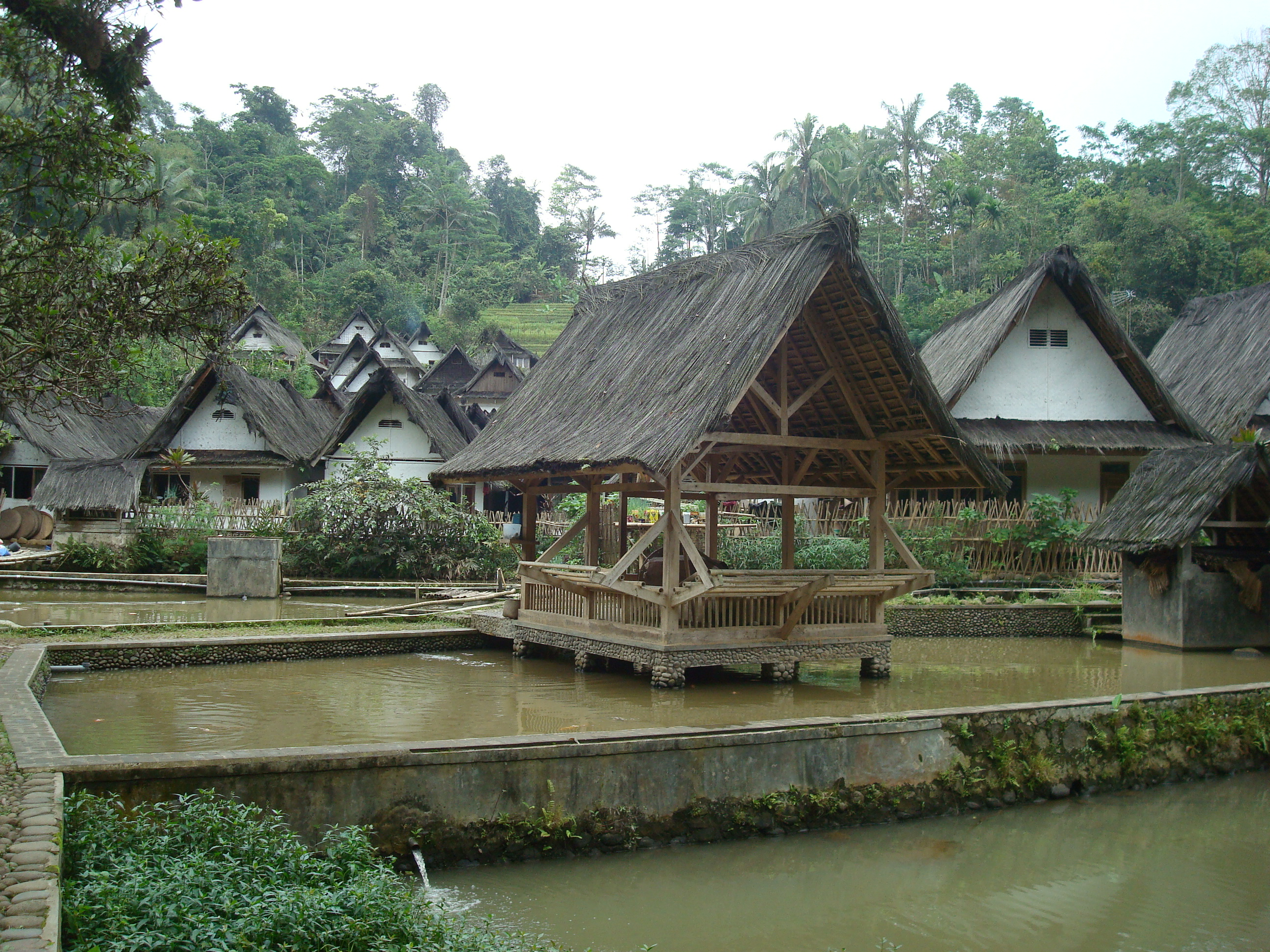
Traditional houses and pond pavilion of Kampung Naga, a traditional Sundanese village in West Java, Indonesia.

A kampong (Za'aba Spelling) or kampung (modern Malay) is a type of village in Southeast Asia, particularly in Brunei, Indonesia, Malaysia, Philippines and Singapore. The term applies to traditional villages, especially of the indigenous peoples living in this region.

==== Brunei ====
In Brunei, villages are officially the third- and lowest-level subdivisions of Brunei below districts and mukims. A village is locally known by the Malay word kampung (also spelt as kampong). They may be villages in the traditional or anthropological sense but may also comprise delineated residential settlements, both rural and urban. The community of a village is headed by a village head (Malay: ketua kampung). Communal infrastructure for the villagers may include a primary school, a religious school providing ugama or Islamic religious primary education which is compulsory for the Muslim pupils in the country, a mosque, and a community centre (Malay: balai raya or dewan kemasyarakatan).

==== Indonesia ====
In Indonesia, depending on the principles they are administered, villages are called kampung or desa (or kelurahan for those with urban functions). A desa (a term that derives from a Sanskrit word meaning "country" that is found in the name "Bangladesh"=bangla and desh/desha) is administered according to traditions and customary law (adat), while a kelurahan is administered along more "modern" principles. Desa are generally located in rural areas while kelurahan are generally urban subdivisions. A village head is respectively called kepala desa or lurah. Both are elected by the local community. A desa or kelurahan is the subdivision of a kecamatan (district), in turn the subdivision of a kabupaten (regency) or kota (city).

The same general concept applies all over Indonesia. However, there is some variation among the vast numbers of Austronesian ethnic groups. For instance, in Bali villages have been created by grouping traditional hamlets or banjar, which constitute the basis of Balinese social life. In the Minangkabau area in West Sumatra province, traditional villages are called nagari (a term deriving from another Sanskrit word meaning "city", which can be found in the name like "Srinagar"=sri and nagar/nagari). In some areas such as Tanah Toraja, elders take turns watching over the village at a command post. As a general rule, desa and kelurahan are groupings of hamlets (kampung in Indonesian, dusun in Javanese, banjar in Bali). a kampung is defined today as a village in Brunei and Indonesia.

==== Malaysia and Singapore ====
Kampung is a term used in Malaysia, (sometimes spelling kampong or kompong in the English language) for "a Malay hamlet or village in a Malay-speaking country". In Malaysia, a kampung is determined as a locality with 10,000 or fewer people. Since historical times, every Malay village came under the leadership of a penghulu (village chief), who has the power to hear civil matters in his village (see Courts of Malaysia for more details).

A Malay village typically contains a mosque or surau, paddy fields and Malay houses on stilts. Malay and Indonesian villagers practice the culture of helping one another as a community, which is better known as "joint bearing of burdens" (gotong royong). They are family-oriented (especially the concept of respecting one's family [particularly the parents and elders]), courtesy and practice belief in God as paramount to everything else. It is common to see a cemetery near the mosque. In Sarawak and East Kalimantan, some villages are called 'long', primarily inhabited by the Orang Ulu.

Malaysian kampung were once aplenty in Singapore but there are almost no remaining kampung villages; the very few to have survived until today are mostly on outlying islands surrounding mainland Singapore, such as Pulau Ubin. Mainland Singapore used to have many kampung villages but modern developments and rapid urbanisation works have seen them bulldozed away; Kampong Lorong Buangkok is the last surviving village on the country's mainland.

The term "kampung", sometimes spelled "kampong", is one of many Malay words to have entered common usage in Malaysia and Singapore. Locally, the term is frequently used to refer to either one's hometown or a rural village, depending on the intended context.

==== Philippines ====
In urban areas of the Philippines, the term "village" most commonly refers to private subdivisions, especially gated communities. These villages emerged in the mid-20th century and were initially the domain of elite urban dwellers. Those are common in major cities in the country and their residents have a wide range of income levels.

Such villages may or may not correspond to a barangay (the country's basic unit of government, also glossed as village), or be privately administered. Barangays correspond more to precolonial villages; the chairman (formerly the village datu) now settles administrative, intrapersonal, and political matters or polices the area though with much less authority and respect than in Indonesia or Malaysia.

In the southern Philippines which is dominated by Moro Muslims, the word kampung was also adopted, but in a Hispanized form, becoming campo. This name itself was originally the influence of the Malayanized Muslim powers that had triumphed in the south of the Philippines, such as the Sultanate of Sulu, Sultanate of Maguindanao, Sultanate of Buayan, and Sultanates of Lanao. Especially the Sultanate of Sulu, because it is close to the spread of Malay culture, its influence is very noticeable, in terms of vocabulary, in this case the word kampung. An example of a place called kampung is a barangay in Zamboanga City, namely Campo Islam or Kampung Islam (lit. 'Islamic Village').

=== Vietnam ===
Villages (làng) made up the basis of Vietnamese society. Vietnamese village is considered one of the typical symbol of Asian agricultural production. Villages in Vietnam typically contains: a village gate, bamboo hedges (lũy tre), a communal house where the tutelary deity (Thành hoàng) is worshiped, a well shared by the whole village, paddy fields (đồng lúa), temples (đền, chùa) and houses of all families in the village. Villagers share the same bloodline and are usually rice farmers, and may also share the same crafts. Village have an important role in Vietnamese society (Vietnamese saying: "Custom rules the law" -"Phép vua thua lệ làng" [literally: the king's law yields to village customs]). It is common for Vietnamese villagers to prefer to be buried in their village upon death.

== Central and Eastern Europe ==
=== Slavic-speaking countries ===
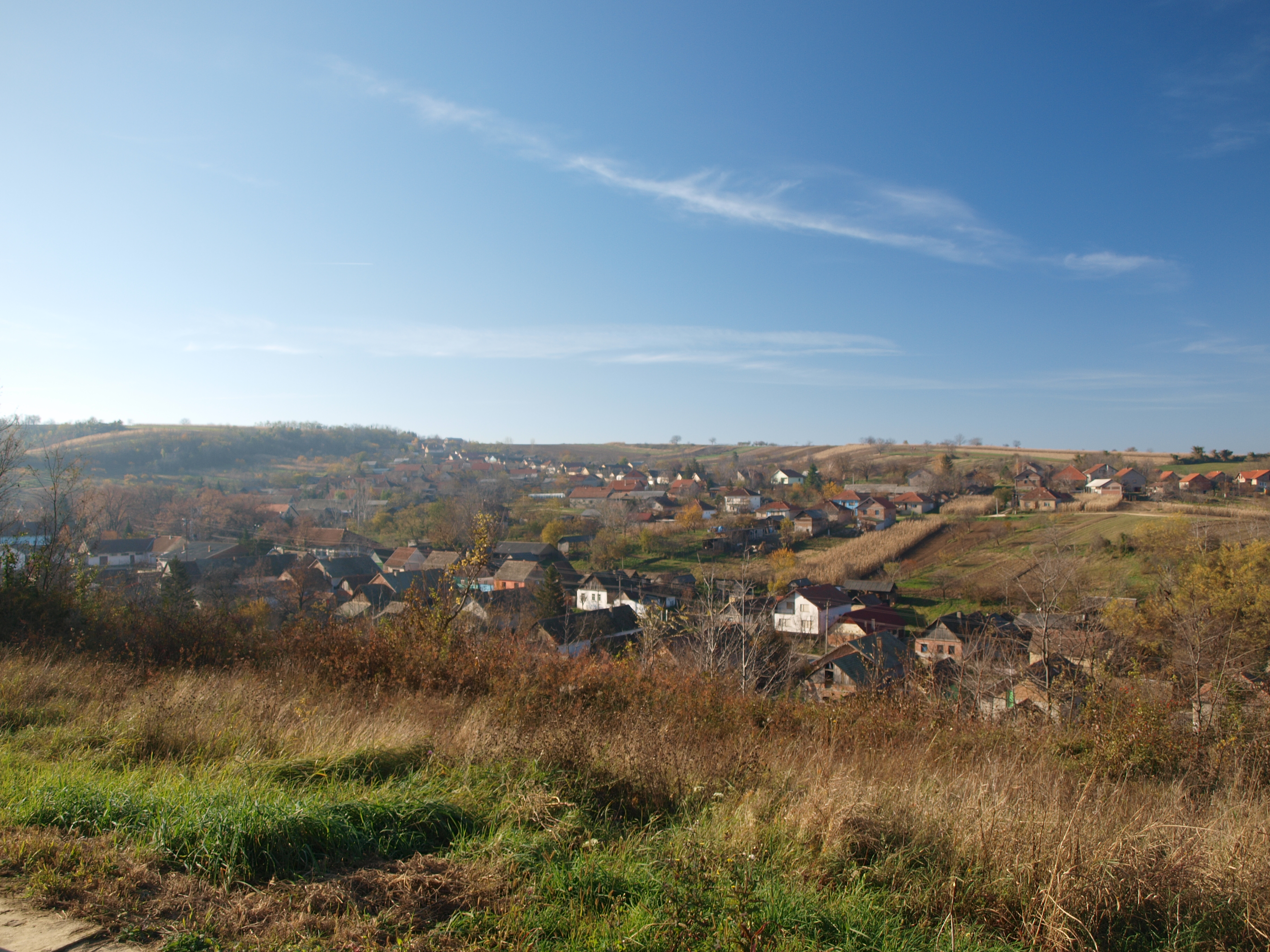
Lug, village in northern Serbia

Selo (Cyrillic: село) is a Slavic word meaning "village" in Bosnia and Herzegovina, Bulgaria, Croatia, North Macedonia, Russia, Serbia, and Ukraine. For example, there are numerous sela (села; plural of selo) called Novo Selo (Ново Село, "New Village") in Bulgaria, Croatia, Montenegro, Serbia, and North Macedonia.

Another Slavic word for a village is ves (Polish: wieś, wioska; Czech: ves, vesnice; Slovak: ves; Slovene: vas; Russian: весь, romanized: ves). In Slovenia, the word selo is used for very small villages (fewer than 100 people) and in dialects; the Slovene word vas is used all over Slovenia. In Russia and Bulgaria, the word ves is archaic, but remains in idioms and locality names, such as Vesyegonsk and Belevehchevo.

The most commonly used word for village in Slovak is dedina (dialectical also dzedzina). The word's etymology may be (or may not be) rooted in the verb dediť ("to inherit"), referencing the inheriting of whole villages or properties within villages by noblemen or wealthy landowners. Another etymology could be related to the Sanskrit word deśá (देश) similar to the Afghan deh, Bengal desh and Indonesian desa. The term ves appears in settlement names (mostly villages, but also some towns that evolved over time from villages). The dialect term for village in east Slovakia is also valal (or valala). Dedina is unrelated to the rarer east Slavic term derevna, which refers to a village with wooden (derevo) housing.

==== Bulgaria ====
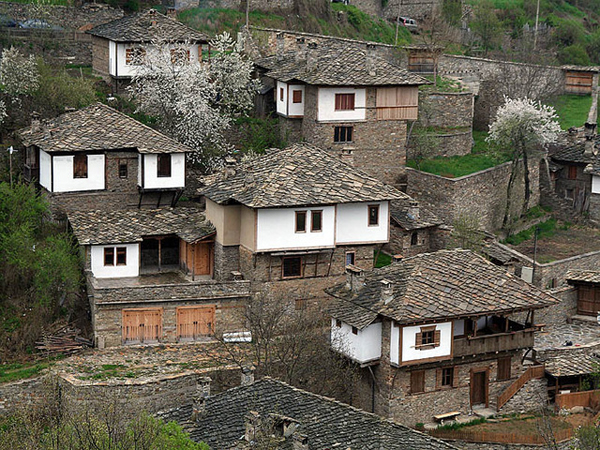
Kovachevitsa, a village in southern Bulgaria

In Bulgaria, the different types of sela vary from a small selo of 5 to 30 families to one of several thousand people. According to a 2002 census, in that year there were 2,385,000 Bulgarian citizens living in settlements classified as villages. A 2004 Human Settlement Profile on Bulgaria conducted by the United Nations Department of Economic and Social Affairs stated that:

The most intensive is the migration "city – city". Approximately 46% of all migrated people have changed their residence from one city to another. The share of the migration processes "village – city" is significantly less – 23% and "city – village" – 20%. The migration "village – village" in 2002 is 11%.

It also stated that

the state of the environment in the small towns and villages is good apart from the low level of infrastructure.

In Bulgaria, it is popular to visit villages for the atmosphere, culture, crafts, hospitality of the people and the surrounding nature. This is called selski turizam (Bulgarian: селски туризъм), meaning "village tourism".

==== Russia ====
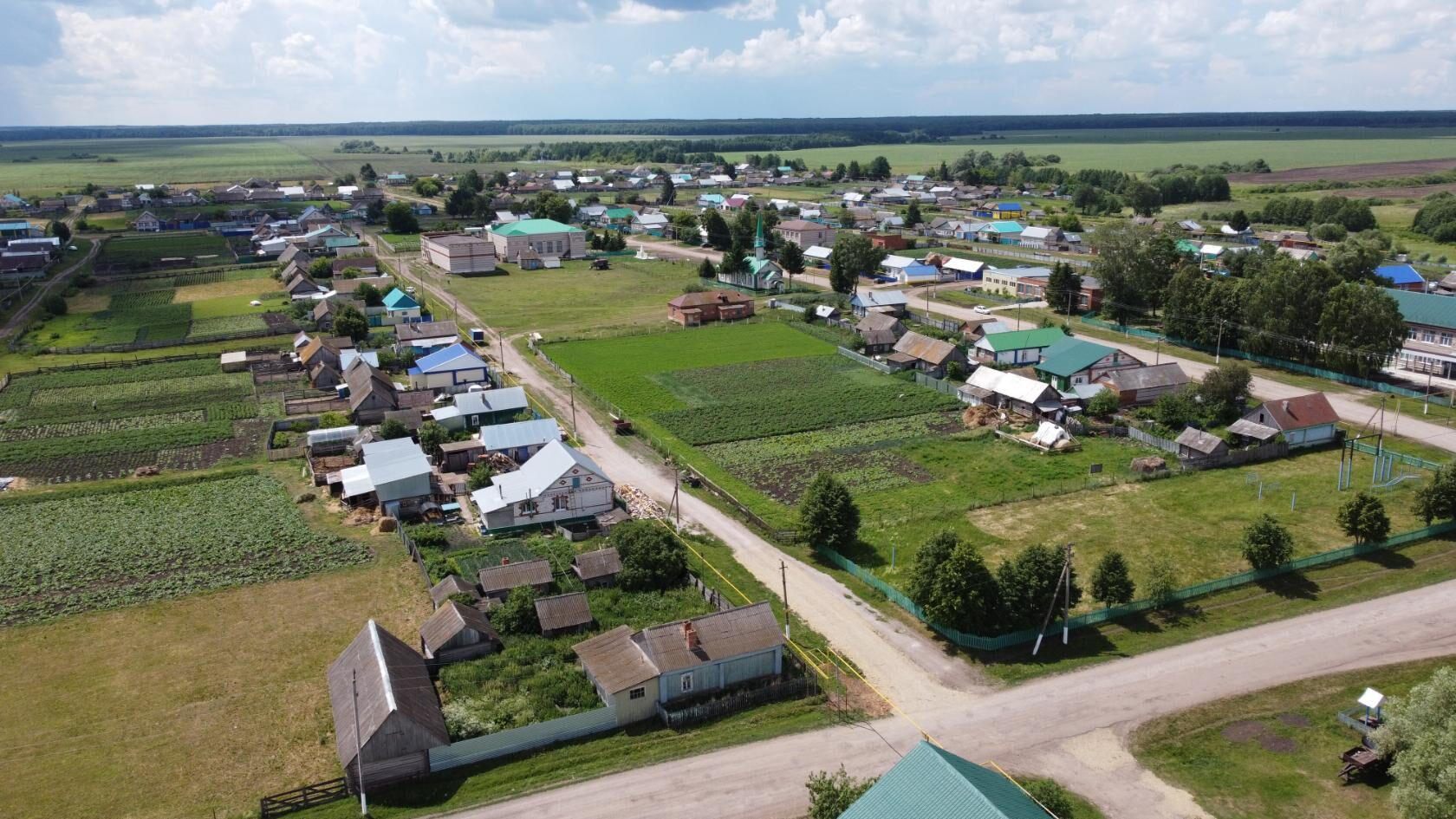
The village of Kichkalnya, Tatarstan

In Russia, as of the 2010 Census, 26.3% of the country's population lives in rural localities; down from 26.7% recorded in the 2002 Census. Multiple types of rural localities exist, but the two most common are derevnya (деревня) and selo (село). Historically, the formal indication of status was religious: a city (gorod, город) had a cathedral, a selo had a church, while a derevnya had neither.

The lowest administrative unit of the Russian Empire, a volost, or its Soviet or modern Russian successor, a selsoviet, was typically headquartered in a selo and embraced a few neighboring villages.

In the 1960s–1970s, the depopulation of the smaller villages was driven by the central planners' drive in order to get the farm workers out of smaller, "prospectless" hamlets and into the collective or state farms' main villages or even larger towns and cities, with more amenities.

Most Russian rural residents are involved in agricultural work, and it is very common for villagers to produce their own food. As prosperous urbanites purchase village houses for their second homes, Russian villages sometimes are transformed into dacha settlements, used mostly for seasonal residence.

The historically Cossack regions of Southern Russia and parts of Ukraine, with their fertile soil and absence of serfdom, had a rather different pattern of settlement from central and northern Russia. While peasants of central Russia lived in a village around the lord's manor, a Cossack family often lived on its own farm, called khutor. A number of such khutors plus a central village made up the administrative unit with a center in a stanitsa (Russian: станица, romanized: stanitsa; Ukrainian: станиця, romanized: stanytsya, lit. 'stanytsia'). Such stanitsas, often with a few thousand residents, were usually larger than a typical selo in central Russia.

==== Ukraine ====
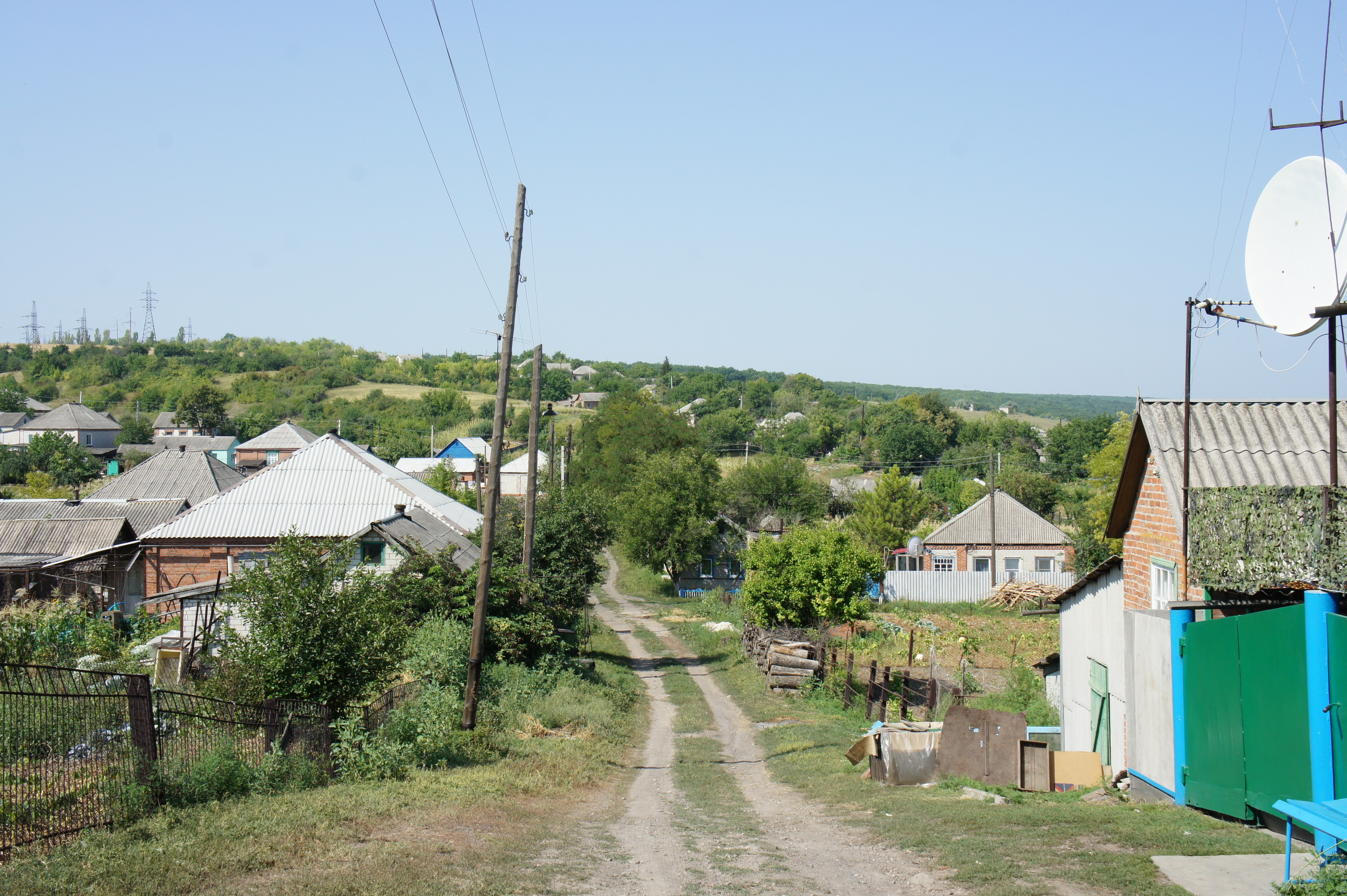
Maiaky, a village in Donetsk Oblast, Ukraine

In Ukraine, a village (Ukrainian: село, romanized: selo, IPA: [seˈlɔ]) is considered the lowest administrative unit. Villages are under the jurisdiction of a hromada administration.

There is another smaller type of rural settlement which is designated in Ukrainian as a selyshche (селище). This type of community is often referred to in English as a "settlement". In the new law about populated places in Ukraine the term "selyshche", has a specific meaning. In the past the word "selyshche" was more ambiguous and there were distinction between rural selyshche and selyshche miskoho typu (urban-type settlement), abbreviated smt in Ukrainian. There are also dacha, fisherman, etc. selyshches

The khutir (хутір) and stanytsia (станиця) are not part of the administrative division any longer, primarily due to collectivization. Khutirs were very small rural localities consisting of just few housing units and were sort of individual farms. They became really popular during the Stolypin reform in the early 20th century. During the collectivization, however, residents of such settlements were usually declared to be kulaks and had all their property confiscated and distributed to others (nationalized) without any compensation. The stanitsa likewise has not survived as an administrative term. The stanitsa was a type of a collective community that could include one or more settlements such as villages, khutirs, and others. Today, stanitsa-type formations have only survived in Kuban (Russian Federation) where Ukrainians were resettled during the time of the Russian Empire.

=== Ashkenazi Jewish culture ===
A shtetl (plural shtetlekh) was a small market town or village with a majority Jewish population in central and eastern Europe. The word shtetl is Yiddish, derived from the word shtot (town) with the suffix -l, a diminutive. Shtetlekh first began to appear in the 13th century, and were characteristic aspects of Jewish life in central and Eastern Europe until the 1940s. The shtetl occupies an important place in Jewish collective memory (particularly the history of Ashkenazi Jews) and has been depicted extensively in literature, visual art, theatre, and film, including such examples as the writing of Mendele Mocher Sforim, Isaac Bashevis Singer, and Sholem Aleichem. Sholem Aleichem's Tevye the Dairyman stories, set in the fictional shtetl of Anatevka, were eventually adapted into the Fiddler on the Roof stage play (which itself was later adapted for film).

During the Holocaust, most shtetlekh were depopulated of their Jewish communities through mass deportations or liquidations. Many are memorialized in yizkor books, written testimonies that describe the histories of Jewish communities destroyed during the Holocaust.

== Western and Southern Europe ==
=== Finland ===
In Finland, a land register village (rekisterikylä) was a cadastral unit used in determining the numeric identifier (kiinteistötunnus) given to a piece of real estate until February 2014, after which identifiers became independent of an estate's location within a municipality or land register village. Thus, identifiers no longer change after municipal mergers or areal transfers, and it is no longer possible to determine which land register village an estate is located on based solely on its identifier. While land register villages developed from land ownership within and around actual settlements during the Great Partition, later on they no longer had any direct connection to actual place names, with local definitions of villages often differing from land register villages. (Note: For example, the modern village of Kuusa in the municipality of Laukaa, as defined by locals, includes parts of five land register villages: Haapavatia, Kuusvesi, Laukkavirta, Pellosniemi and Petruma.)

=== France ===
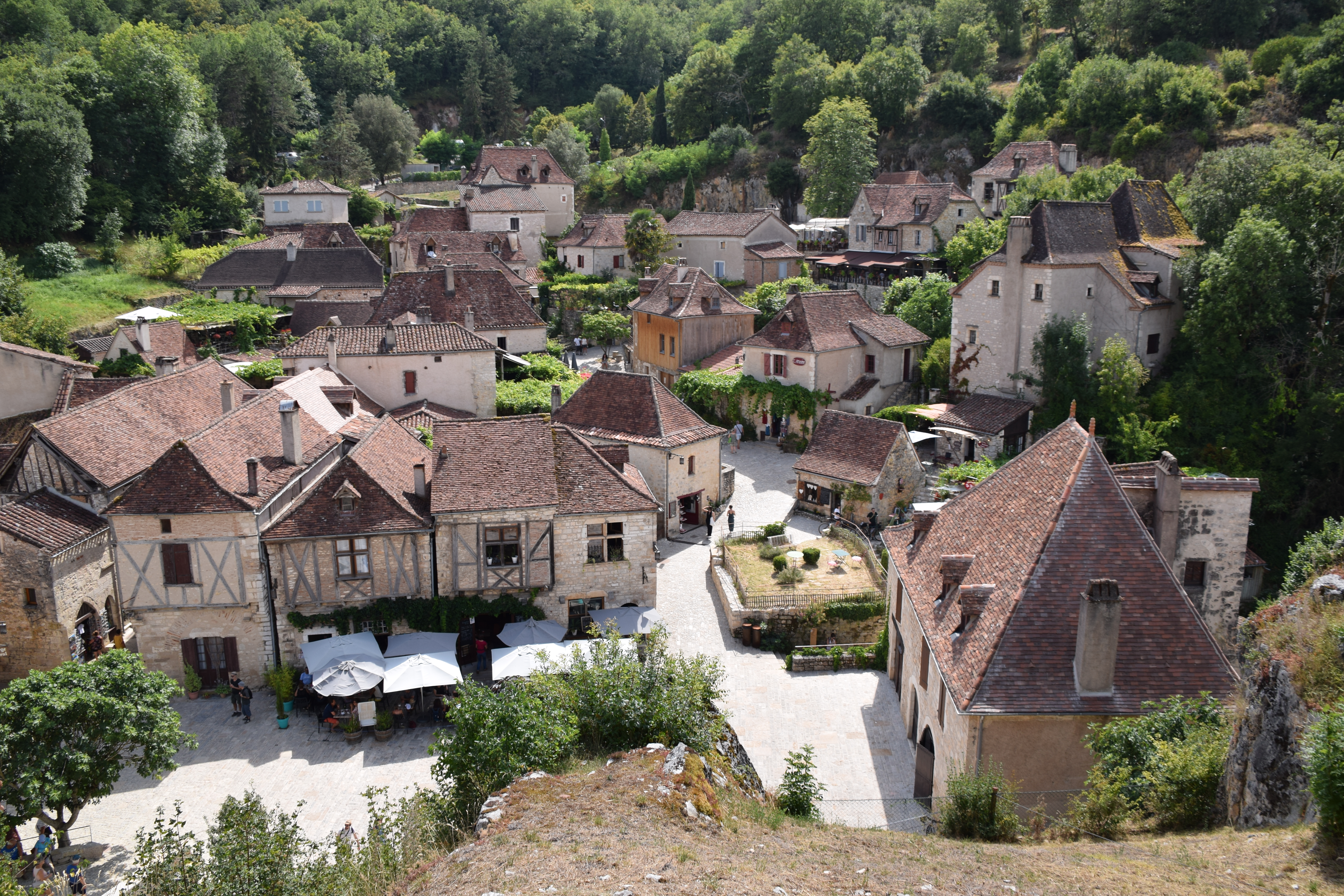
Saint-Cirq-Lapopie in Lot is one of "The Most Beautiful Villages in France".

The Insee classifies French communes into four groups according to population density:

1. Communes with high population density
2. Communes with intermediate population density
3. Communes with low population density
4. Communes with very low population density

A commune in Group 3 or 4 is considered as a village (commune rurale).

An independent association named Les Plus Beaux Villages de France (affiliated to the international association The Most Beautiful Villages in the World), was created in 1982 to promote assets of small and picturesque French villages of quality heritage. As of July 2023, 172 villages in France have been listed in "The Most Beautiful Villages of France".

=== Germany ===
In Germany a Dorf (village) usually consists of at least a few houses but can have up to a few thousand inhabitants. Larger villages can also be referred to as a Flecken or Markt depending on the region and the settlement's market rights. Smaller villages usually do not have their own government. Instead, they are part (Ortsteil) of the municipality of a nearby town. In the settlement geography typology in Germany, a distinction is made between individual settlements and group settlements. Only group settlements of a certain size ("large group settlement") are referred to as villages. The size that a settlement must have in order to be considered a village varies from region to region. Only settlements in rural areas are referred to as villages. Ideal villages were traditionally characterized by agriculture, most of the inhabitants were farmers or agricultural workers, the settlement form was determined by the farmhouses and was closely connected to the surrounding farmland, the meadow and the traditional land forms. In addition, the majority of the population used to live in rural settlements, whereas today only a small proportion still does. Whereas in the German Reich in 1900, almost half (46%) of the population lived in rural areas, the proportion in the Federal Republic of Germany had fallen to around a quarter (23%) by 2015.

=== Italy ===
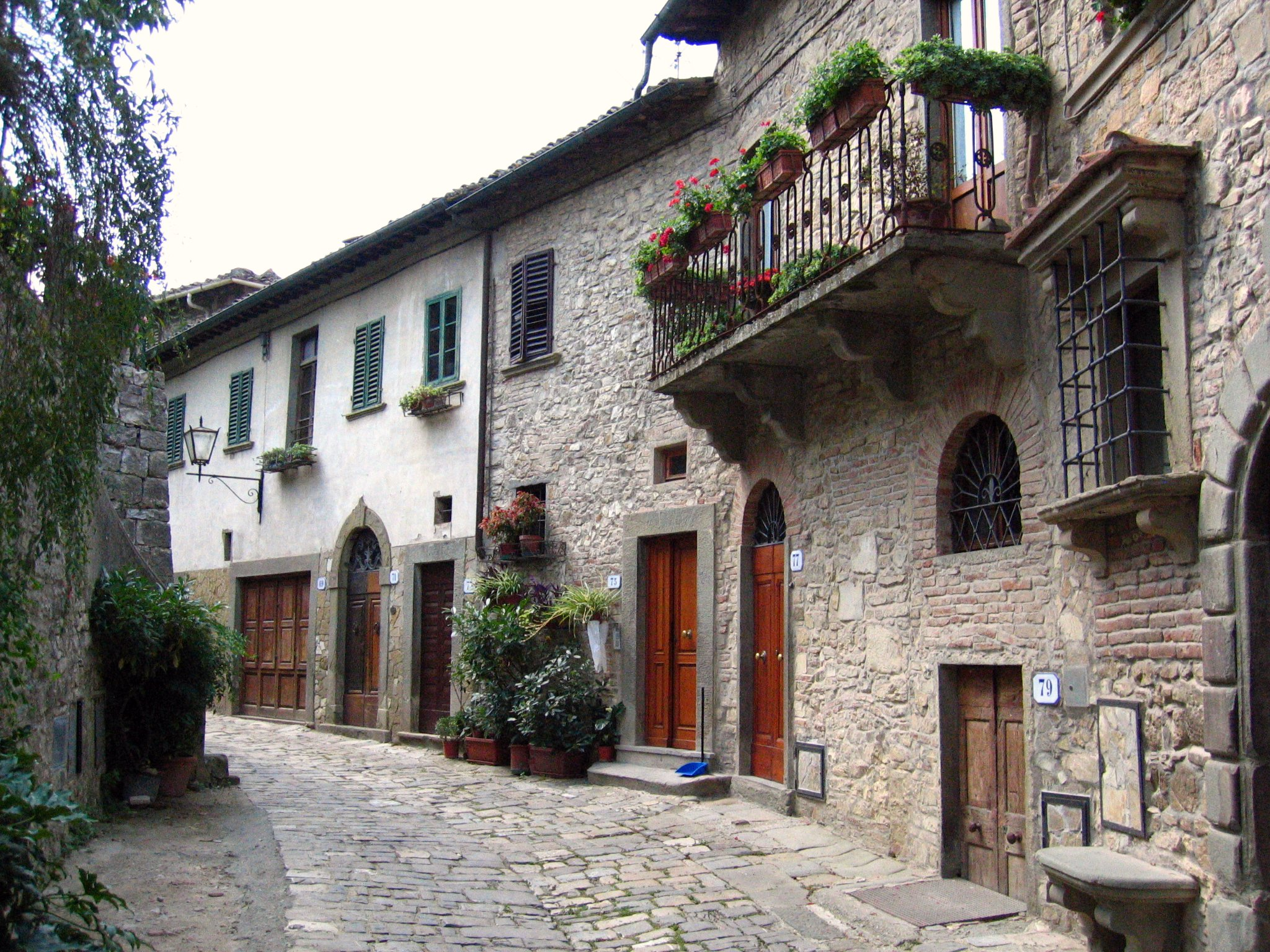
Montefioralle in Tuscany is one of "The Most Beautiful Villages in Italy".

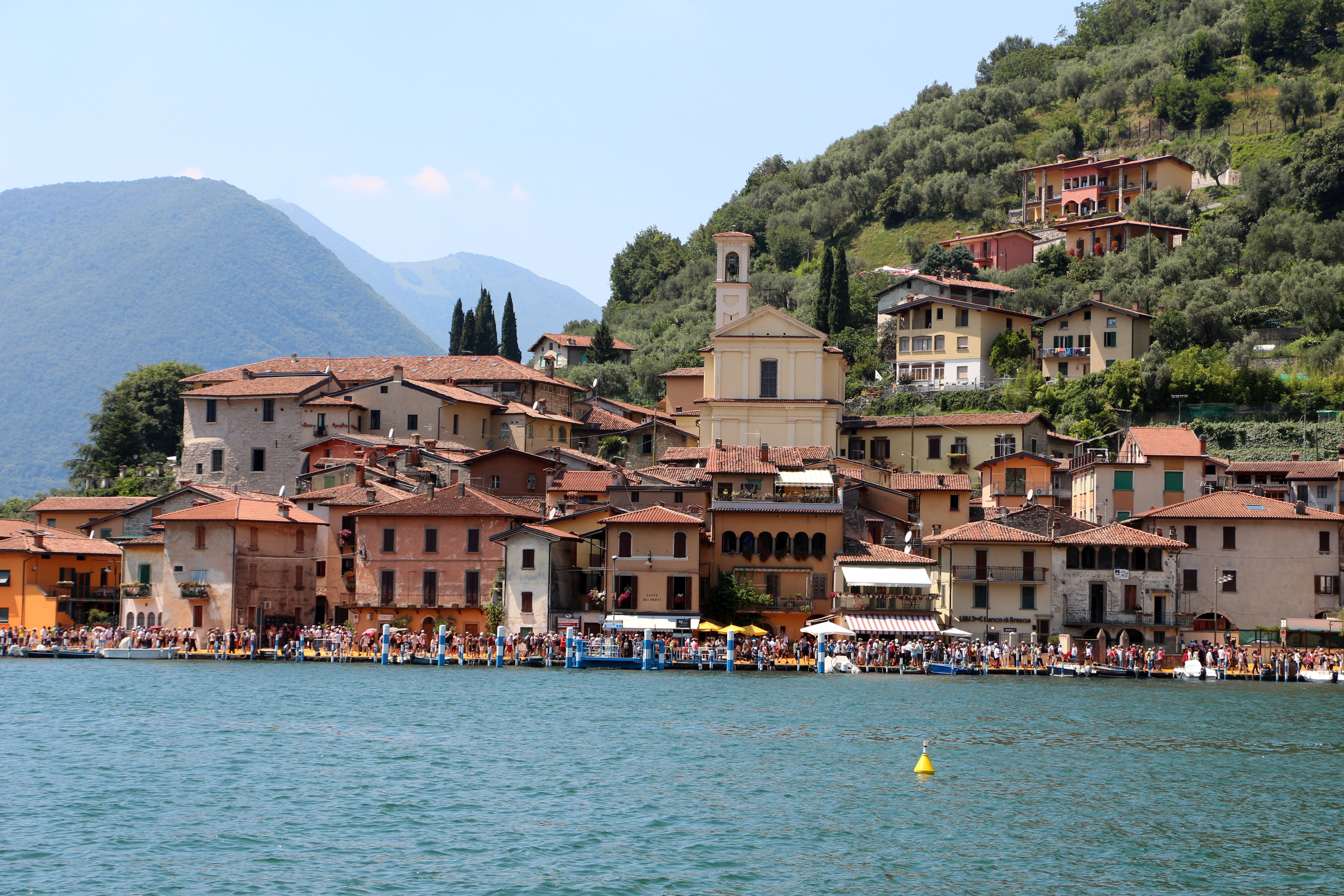
Monte Isola in Lombardy is one of "The Most Beautiful Villages in Italy".

In Italy, villages are spread throughout the country. No legal definition of village exists in Italian law; nonetheless, a settlement inhabited by less than 2000 people is usually described as "village". More often, Italian villages that are a part of a municipality are called frazione, whereas the village that hosts the municipal seat is called paese (town) or capoluogo.

A non-profit private association of small Italian towns of strong historical and artistic interest named I Borghi più belli d'Italia (English: The most beautiful Villages of Italy) and affiliated to the international association The Most Beautiful Villages in the World, was created in 2001 on the initiative of the Tourism Council of the National Association of Italian Municipalities with the aim of preserving and maintaining villages of quality heritage. Founded to contribute to safeguarding, conserving and revitalizing small villages and municipalities, but sometimes even individual hamlets, which, being outside the main tourist circuits, they risk, despite their great value, being forgotten with consequent degradation, depopulation and abandonment. Its motto is Il fascino dell'Italia nascosta ("The charm of hidden Italy"). As of November 2023, 361 villages in Italy have been listed in "The Most Beautiful Villages of Italy".

The criteria for admission to the association meet the following requirements: integrity of the urban fabric, architectural harmony, livability of the village, artistic-historical quality of the public and private building heritage, services to the citizen as well as the payment of an annual membership fee.

The association organizes initiatives within the villages, such as festivals, exhibitions, fetes, conferences and concerts that highlight the cultural, historical, gastronomic and linguistic heritage, involving residents, schools, and local artists. The club promotes numerous initiatives on the international market. In 2016, the association signed a global agreement with ENIT, to promote tourism in the most beautiful villages in the world. In 2017, the club signed an agreement with Costa Cruises for the enhancement of some villages, which are offered to cruise passengers arriving in Italian ports aboard the operator's ships.

=== Spain ===
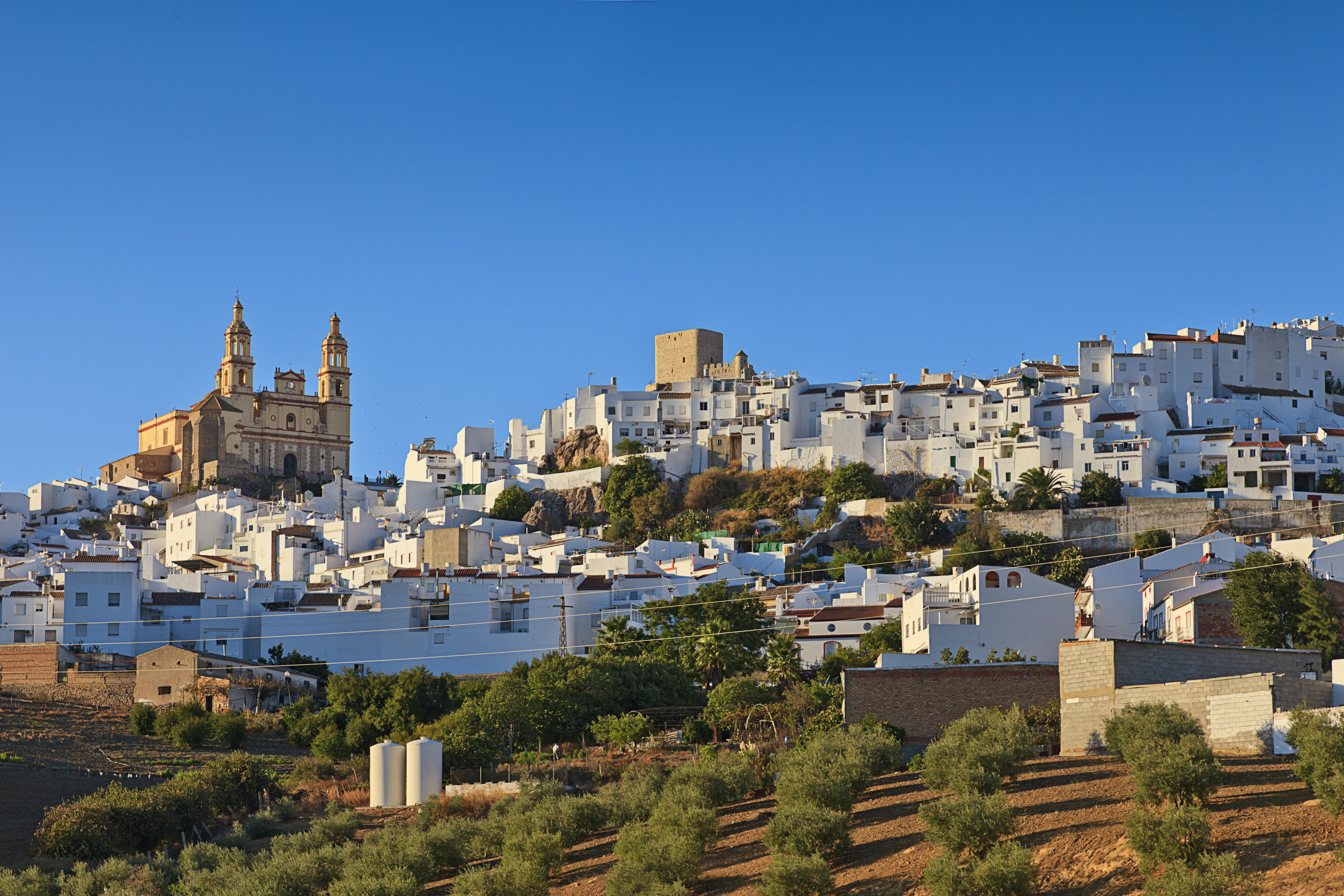
Olvera (Spain) is one of the White Towns of Andalusia.

In Spain, a village (pueblo) refers to a small population unit, smaller than a town (villa [an archaic term that survives only in official uses, such as the official name of Spain's capital, "la Villa de Madrid"]) and a city (ciudad), typically located in a rural environment. While commonly it is the smallest administrative unit (municipio), it is possible for a village to be legally composed of smaller population units in its territory. There is not a clear-cut distinction between villages, towns and cities in Spain, since they had been traditionally categorized according to their religious importance and their relationship with surrounding population units.

=== Portugal ===
Villages (aldeias, singular: aldeia) are more usual in the northern and central regions, Azores Islands and in the Alentejo. Most of them have a church and a Casa do Povo (people's house), where the village's summer romarias or religious festivities are usually held. Summer is also when many villages are host to a range of folk festivals and fairs, taking advantage of the fact that many of the locals who reside abroad tend to come back to their native village for the holidays.

=== Netherlands ===
In the flood-prone districts of the Netherlands, particularly in the northern provinces of Friesland and Groningen, villages were traditionally built on low man-made hills called terpen before the introduction of regional dyke-systems. In modern days, the term dorp (lit. "village") is usually applied to settlements no larger than 20,000, though there's no official law regarding status of settlements in the Netherlands.

=== United Kingdom ===
A village in the UK is a compact settlement of houses, smaller in size than a town, and generally based on agriculture or, in some areas, mining (such as Ouston, County Durham), quarrying or sea fishing. They are very similar to those in Ireland.

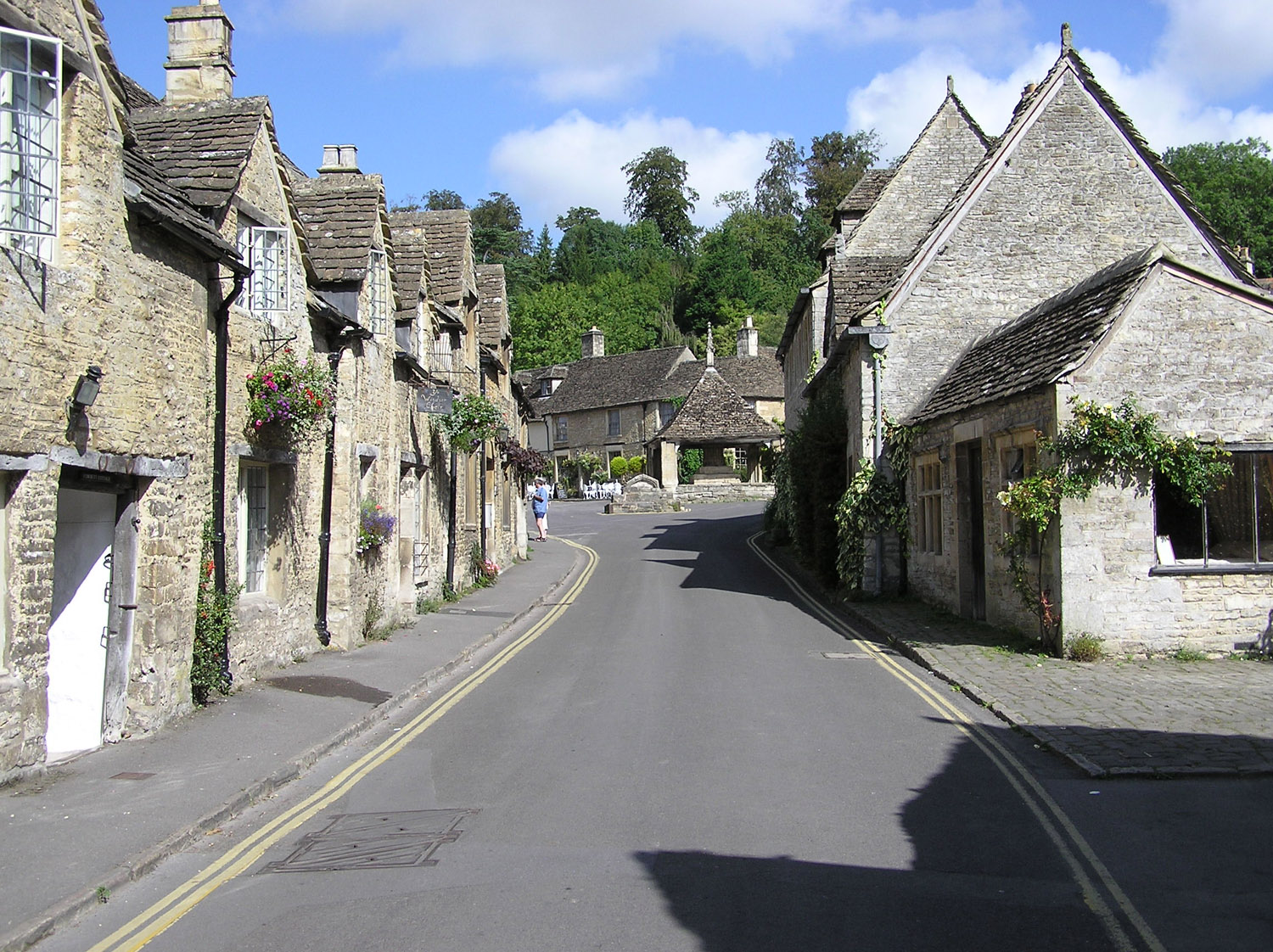
The main street of the village of Castle Combe, Wiltshire, England

The major factors in the type of settlement are: location of water sources, organization of agriculture and landholding, and likelihood of flooding. For example, in areas such as the Lincolnshire Wolds, the villages are often found along the spring line halfway down the hillsides, and originate as spring line settlements, with the original open field systems around the village. In northern Scotland, most villages are planned to a grid pattern located on or close to major roads, whereas in areas such as the Forest of Arden, woodland clearances produced small hamlets around village greens. Because of the topography of the Clent Hills the north Worcestershire village of Clent is an example of a village with no centre but instead consists of series of hamlets scattered on and around the Hills.

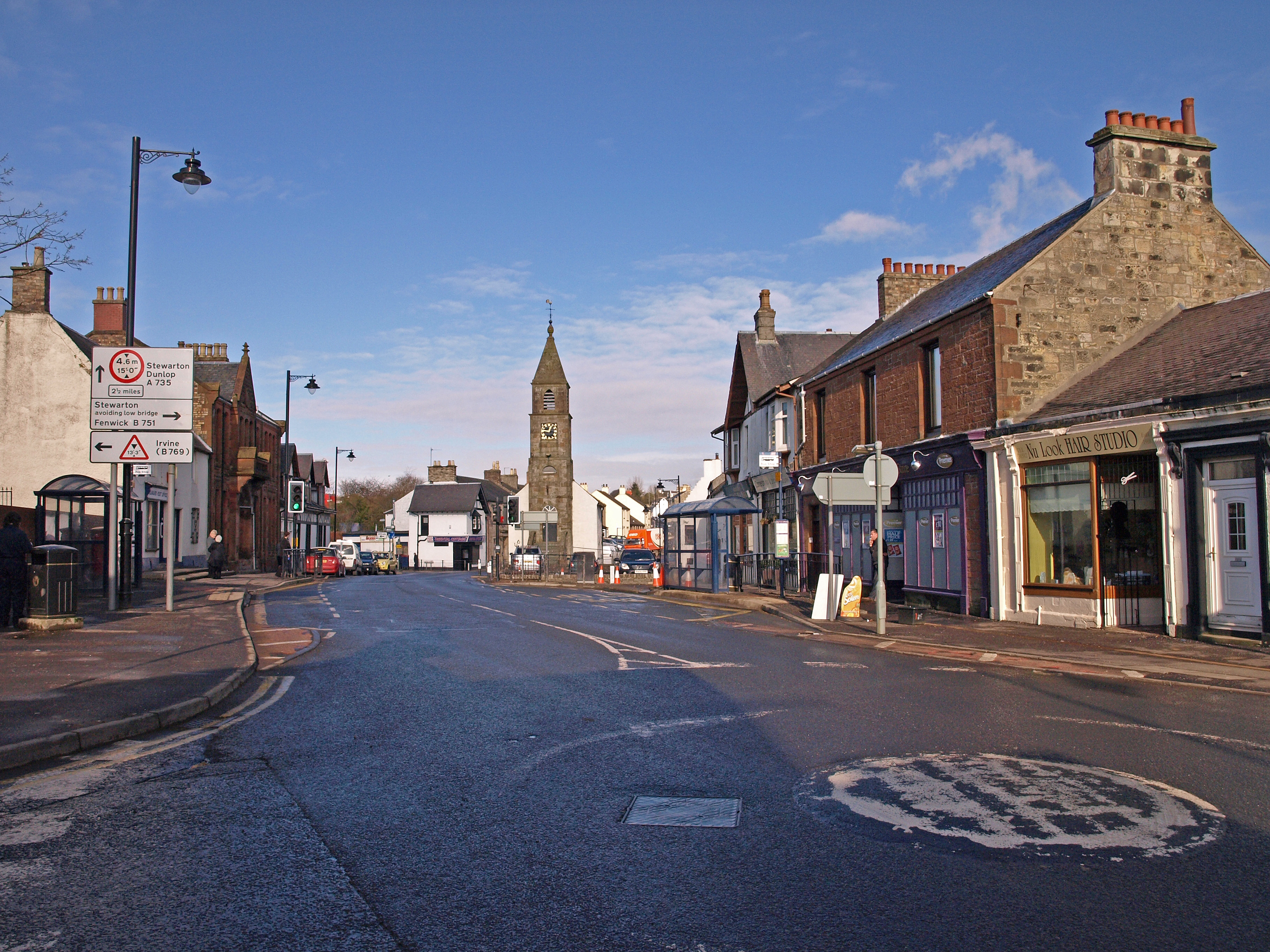
Kilmaurs in East Ayrshire, Scotland

Some villages have disappeared (for example, deserted medieval villages), sometimes leaving behind a church or manor house and sometimes nothing but bumps in the fields. Some show archaeological evidence of settlement at three or four different layers, each distinct from the previous one. Clearances may have been to accommodate sheep or game estates, or enclosure, or may have resulted from depopulation, such as after the Black Death or following a move of the inhabitants to more prosperous districts. Other villages have grown and merged and often form hubs within the general mass of suburbia—such as Hampstead, London and Didsbury in Manchester. Many villages are now predominantly dormitory locations and have suffered the loss of shops, churches and other facilities.

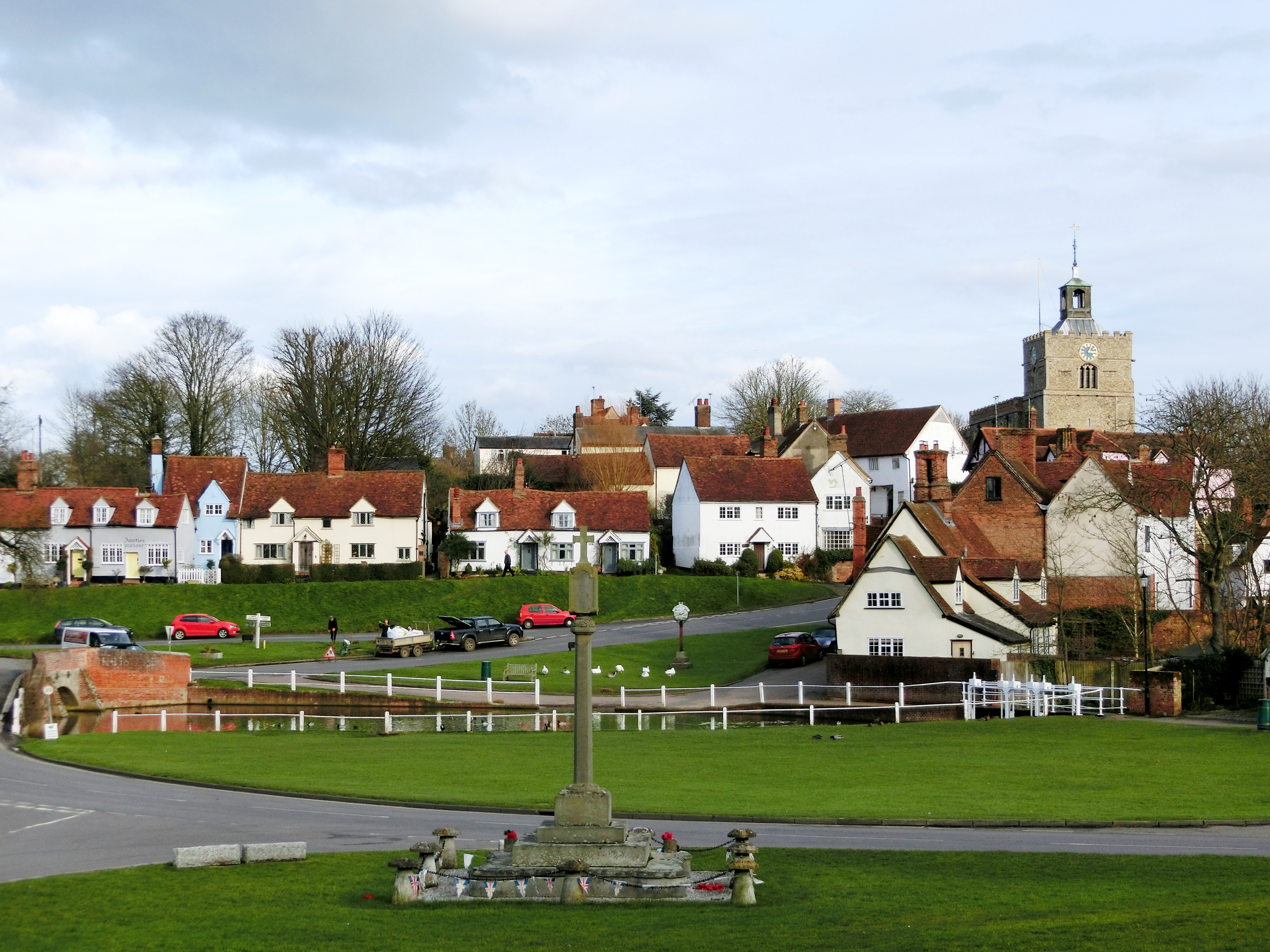
Finchingfield, Essex - a quintessential English village.

For many British people, the village represents an ideal of Great Britain. Seen as being far from the bustle of modern life, it is represented as quiet and harmonious, if a little inward-looking. This concept of an unspoilt Arcadia is present in many popular representations of the village such as the radio serial The Archers or the best kept village competitions.

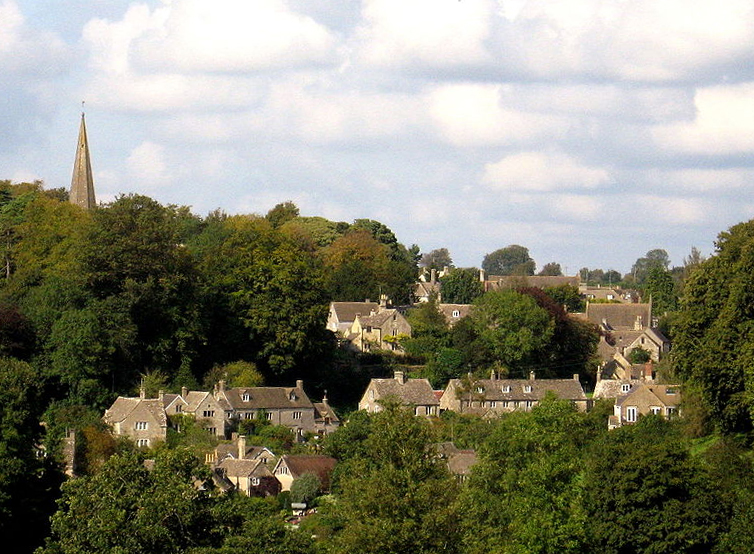
Bisley, Gloucestershire, a village in the Cotswolds

Many villages in South Yorkshire, north Nottinghamshire, north east Derbyshire, County Durham, South Wales and Northumberland are known as pit villages. These (such as Murton, County Durham) grew from hamlets when the sinking of a colliery in the early 20th century resulted in a rapid growth in their population and the colliery owners built new housing, shops, pubs and churches. Some pit villages outgrew nearby towns by area and population; for example, Rossington in South Yorkshire came to have over four times more people than the nearby town of Bawtry. Some pit villages grew to become towns; for example, Maltby in South Yorkshire grew from 600 people in the 19th century to over 17,000 in 2007. Maltby was constructed under the auspices of the Sheepbridge Coal and Iron Company and included ample open spaces and provision for gardens.

In the UK, the main historical distinction between a hamlet and a village was that the latter had a church, and so usually was the centre of worship for an ecclesiastical parish. However, some civil parishes may contain more than one village. The typical village had a pub or inn, shops, and a blacksmith. But many of these facilities are now gone, and many villages are dormitories for commuters. The population of such settlements ranges from a few hundred people to around five thousand. A village is distinguished from a town in that:

- A village should not have a regular agricultural market, although today such markets are uncommon even in settlements which clearly are towns.
- A village does not have a town hall nor a mayor.
- If a village is the principal settlement of a civil parish, then any administrative body that administers it at parish level should be called a parish council or parish meeting, and not a town council or city council. However, some civil parishes have no functioning parish, town, or city council nor a functioning parish meeting. In Wales, where the equivalent of an English civil parish is called a Community, the body that administers it is called a Community Council. However, larger councils may elect to call themselves town councils. In Scotland, the equivalent is also a community council, however, despite being statutory bodies they have no executive powers.
- There should be a clear green belt or open fields, as, for example, seen on aerial maps for Ouston surrounding its parish borders. However this may not be applicable to urbanised villages: although these may not be considered to be villages, they are often widely referred to as being so; an example of this is Horsforth in Leeds.

== Middle East ==
=== Lebanon ===
Like France, villages in Lebanon are usually located in remote mountainous areas. The majority of villages in Lebanon retain their Aramaic names or are derivative of the Aramaic names, and this is because Aramaic was still in use in Mount Lebanon up to the 18th century.

Many of the Lebanese villages are a part of districts, these districts are known as "kadaa" which includes the districts of Baabda (Baabda), Aley (Aley), Matn (Jdeideh), Keserwan (Jounieh), Chouf (Beiteddine), Jbeil (Byblos), Tripoli (Tripoli), Zgharta (Zgharta / Ehden), Bsharri (Bsharri), Batroun (Batroun), Koura (Amioun), Miniyeh-Danniyeh (Minyeh / Sir Ed-Danniyeh), Zahle (Zahle), Rashaya (Rashaya), Western Beqaa (Jebjennine / Saghbine), Sidon (Sidon), Jezzine (Jezzine), Tyre (Tyre), Nabatiyeh (Nabatiyeh), Marjeyoun (Marjeyoun), Hasbaya (Hasbaya), Bint Jbeil (Bint Jbeil), Baalbek (Baalbek), and Hermel (Hermel).

The district of Danniyeh consists of thirty-six small villages, which includes Almrah, Kfirchlan, Kfirhbab, Hakel al Azimah, Siir, Bakhoun, Miryata, Assoun, Sfiiri, Kharnoub, Katteen, Kfirhabou, Zghartegrein, Ein Qibil.

Danniyeh (known also as Addinniyeh, Al Dinniyeh, Al Danniyeh, Arabic: سير الضنية) is a region located in Miniyeh-Danniyeh District in the North Governorate of Lebanon. The region lies east of Tripoli, extends north as far as Akkar District, south to Bsharri District and Zgharta District and as far east as Baalbek and Hermel. Dinniyeh has an excellent ecological environment filled with woodlands, orchards and groves. Several villages are located in this mountainous area, the largest town being Sir Al Dinniyeh.

An example of a typical mountainous Lebanese village in Dannieh would be Hakel al Azimah which is a small village that belongs to the district of Danniyeh, situated between Bakhoun and Assoun's boundaries. It is in the centre of the valleys that lie between the Arbeen Mountains and the Khanzouh.

=== Syria ===
Syria contains a large number of villages that vary in size and importance, including the ancient, historical and religious villages, such as Ma'loula, Sednaya, and Brad (Mar Maroun's time). The diversity of the Syrian environments creates significant differences between the Syrian villages in terms of the economic activity and the method of adoption. Villages in the south of Syria (Hauran, Jabal al-Druze), the north-east (the Syrian island) and the Orontes River basin depend mostly on agriculture, mainly grain, vegetables, and fruits. Villages in the region of Damascus and Aleppo depend on trading. Some other villages, such as Marmarita depend heavily on tourist activity.

Mediterranean cities in Syria, such as Tartus and Latakia have similar types of villages. Mainly, villages were built in very good sites which had the fundamentals of the rural life, like water. An example of a Mediterranean Syrian village in Tartus would be al-Annazah, which is a small village that belongs to the area of al-Sauda. The area of al-Sauda is called a nahiya.

== Oceania ==
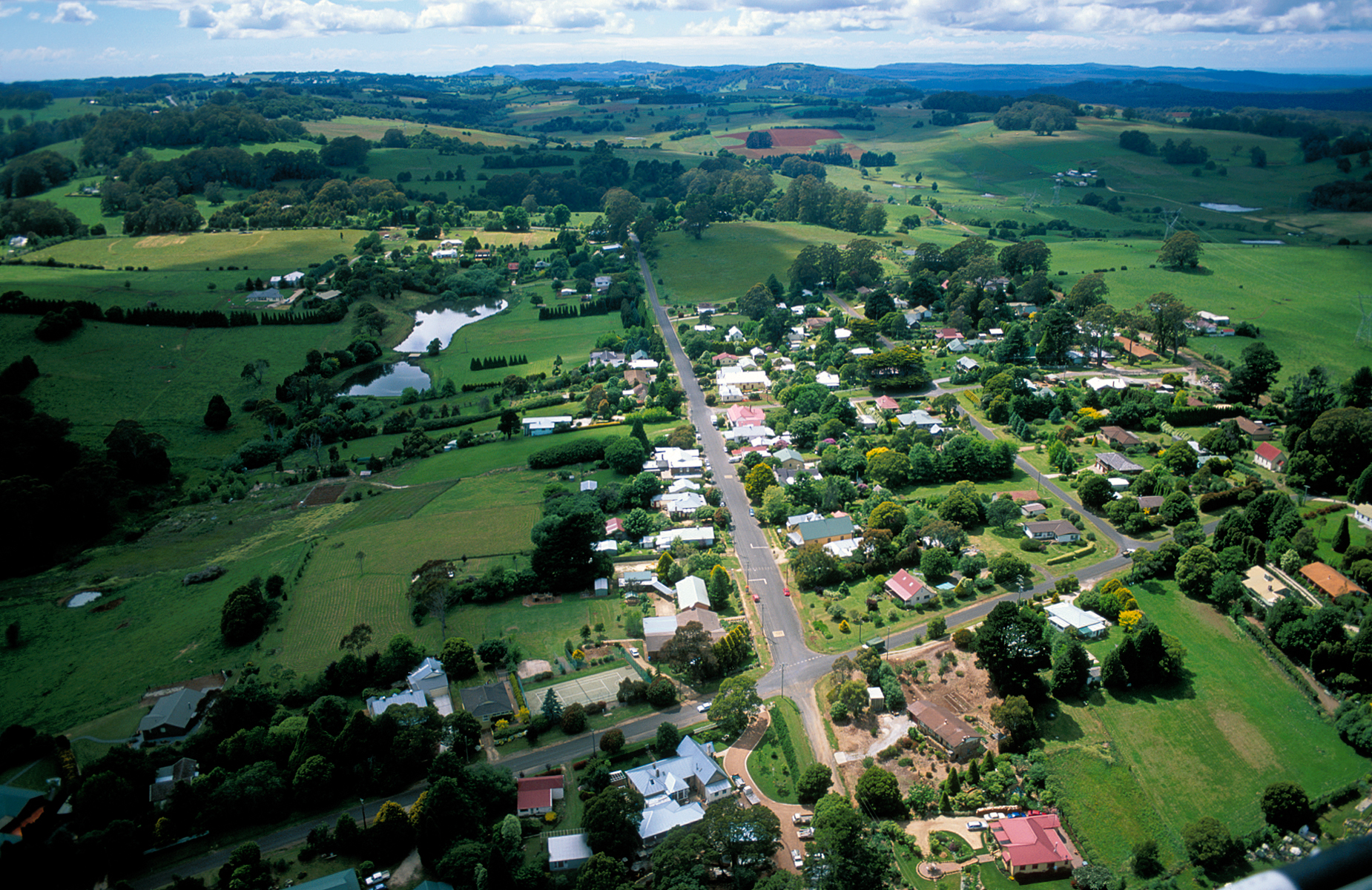
The village of Burrawang in New South Wales, Australia

Pacific Islands Communities on Pacific islands were historically called villages by English speakers who traveled and settled in the area. Some communities such as several Villages of Guam continue to be called villages despite having large populations that can exceed 40,000 residents.

New Zealand The traditional Māori village was the pā, a fortified hill-top settlement. Tree-fern logs and flax were the main building materials. As in Australia (see below) the term is now used mainly in respect of shopping or other planned areas.

Australia The term village often is used in reference to small planned communities such as retirement communities or shopping districts, and tourist areas such as ski resorts. Small rural communities are usually known as townships. Larger settlements are known as towns.

== South America ==
Argentina Usually set in remote mountainous areas, some also cater to winter sports or tourism. See Uspallata, La Cumbrecita, Villa Traful and La Cumbre.

Guyana In various areas villages can still be found in Guyana. While many are now towns, there are several areas on river banks, and communities off central roads that are still locally considered villages.

Uruguay Village or "villa" is one of the three levels at which the government classifies urbanizations or "localidades", a "villa" is highest rank than a "pueblo" which is the lowest unit and lower than a city or "ciudad", which is the highest rank. This organization is more related with notability than size, since there is no official criteria to determine the level of urbanization. Every urbanization is a "pueblo" unless is elevated by decree to the next category. Historically this was a faculty of the executive power but more recently this faculty was transferred to the legislative. However colloquial speech still refers as "pueblo" to most "villas" and even cities and many names preceded by the word "villa" could represent other standard, such as "Villa del Cerro" or "Villa Serrana".

== North America ==
In contrast to the Old World, the concept of village in Canada and the United States today is largely disconnected from its rural and communal origins. The situation is different in Mexico because of its large bulk of indigenous population living in traditional villages.

=== Canada ===
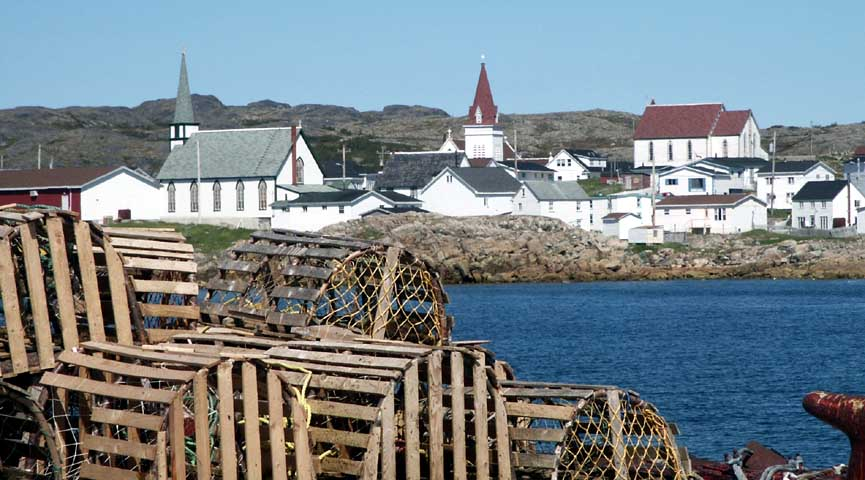
A Newfoundland, Canada fishing village

It is believed that the name Canada may be a transliteration of the Iroquoisan word for "village". Jacques Cartier was given directions to the Kanata of Kebec and it became the name of the French Colonial district before it was the nation's name.

=== United States ===
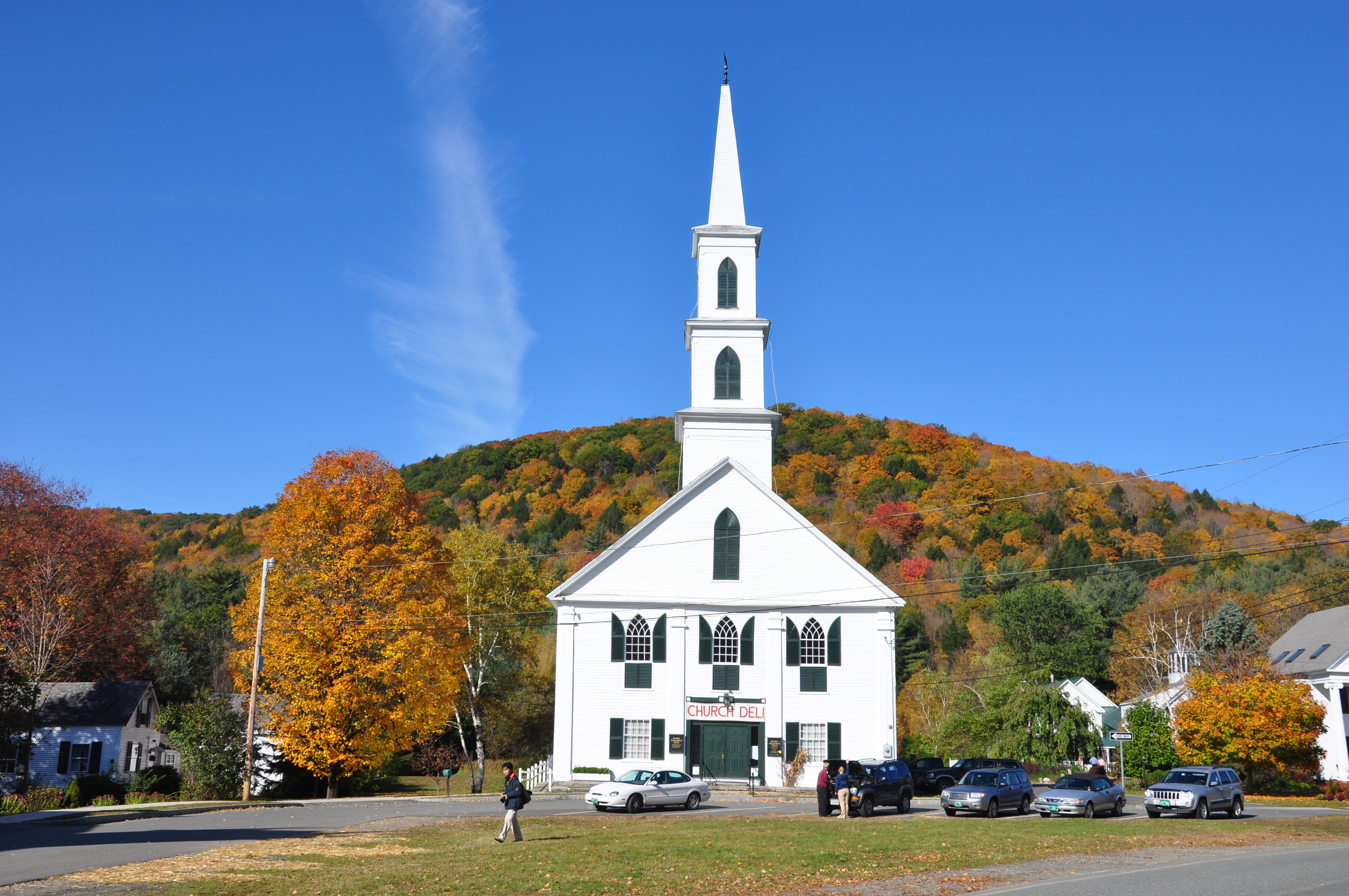
The town of Newfane, Vermont, United States, includes the villages of Newfane, Williamsville, and South Newfane.

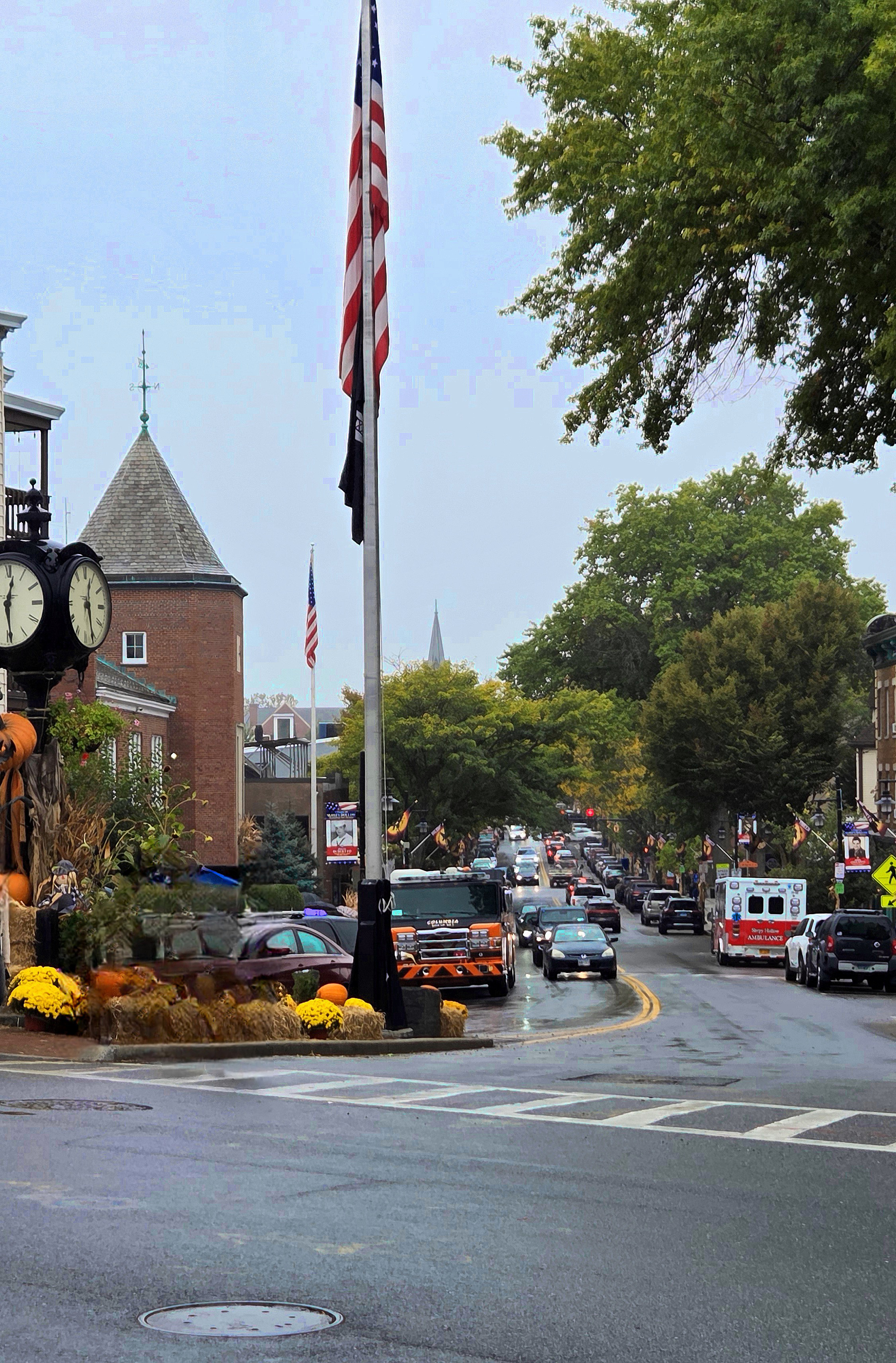
Sleepy Hollow, New York, United States, is one of several villages and hamlets within the town of Mount Pleasant.

==== Incorporated villages ====
In twenty U.S. states, the term "village" refers to a specific form of incorporated municipal government, similar to a city but with less authority and geographic scope. However, this is a generality; in many states, there are villages that are an order of magnitude larger than the smallest cities in the state. The distinction is not necessarily based on population, but on the relative powers granted to the different types of municipalities and correspondingly, different obligations to provide specific services to residents.

In some states such as New York and Michigan, a village is an incorporated municipality, within a single town or civil township. In some cases, the village may be coterminous with the town or township, in which case the two may have a consolidated government. There are also villages that span the boundaries of more than one town or township; some villages may straddle county borders.

There is no population limit to villages in New York. Hempstead, the largest village, has 55,000 residents, making it more populous than some of the state's cities. However, villages in the state may not exceed five square miles (13 km^{2}) in area. Michigan and Illinois also have no set population limit for villages and there are many villages that are larger than cities in those states. The village of Schaumburg, Illinois had 78,723 residents as of the 2020 census. A village also has no written figure against how small a population can be, with the United States' smallest incorporated village being Dering Harbor, NY, with a population of just over 10.

In Michigan, a village is always legally part of a township. Villages can incorporate land in multiple townships and even multiple counties. The largest village in the state is Beverly Hills in Southfield Township which had a population of 10,267 people as of the 2010 census.

In the state of Wisconsin, a village is always legally separate from the towns that it has been incorporated from. The largest village is Menomonee Falls, which has over 32,000 residents. In Pennsylvania law, the term borough is used to refer to the same type of entity. 80% of Pennsylvania's 956 boroughs have populations of less than 5,000 but about thirty have populations of over 10,000 with State College having more than 40,000 residents.

In Ohio villages are usually legally part of the township from which they were incorporated, although exceptions such as Hiram exist, in which the village is separate from the township. Villages become cities if they grow to a population of at least 5,000.

In Maryland, a locality designated "Village of ..." may be either an incorporated town or a special tax district. An example of the latter is the Village of Friendship Heights.

In North Carolina, the only difference between cities, towns, and villages is the term itself.

==== Unincorporated villages ====
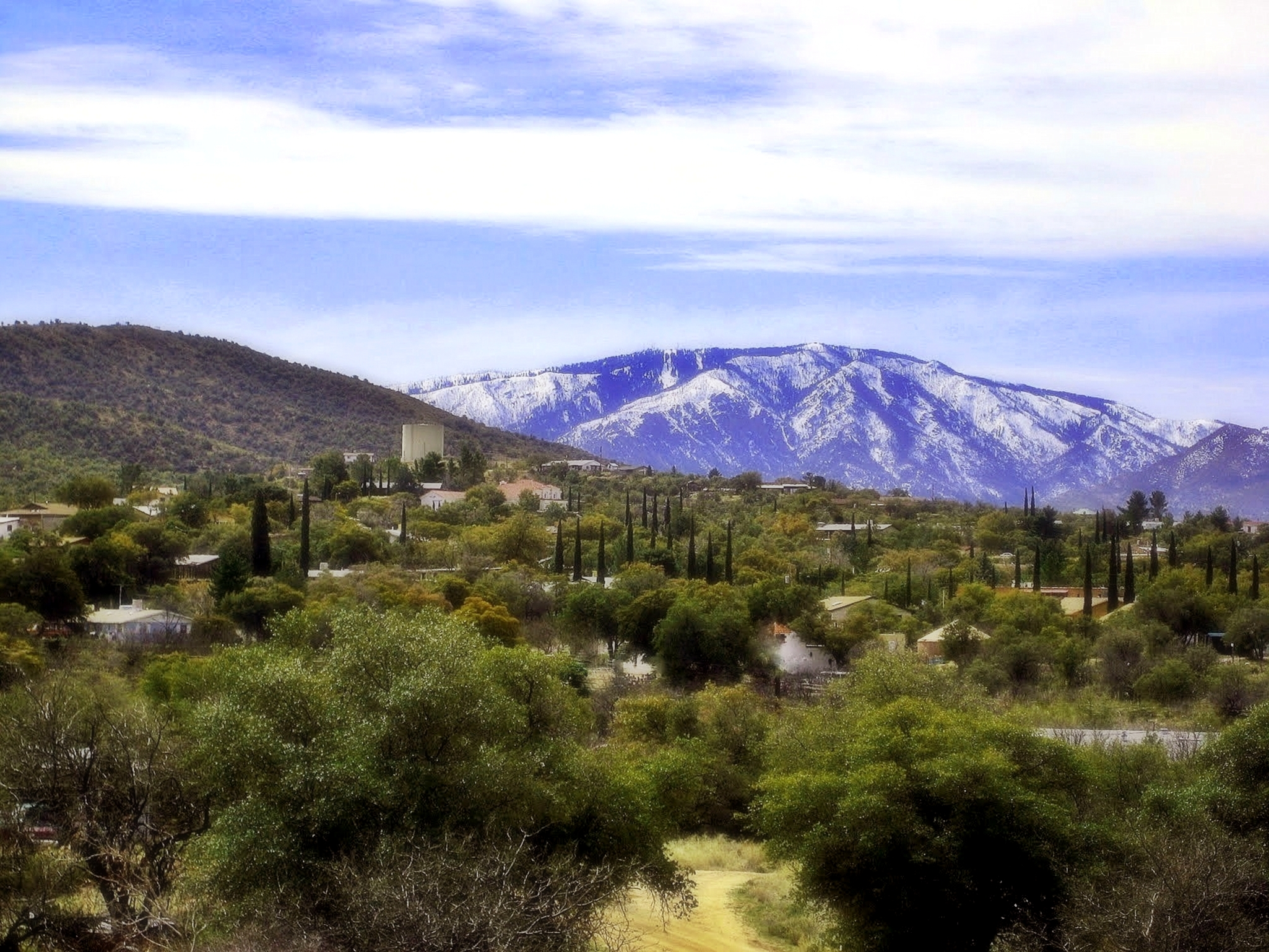
Oracle, Arizona, United States, is an unincorporated rural town often called a village in local media.

In many states, the term "village" is used to refer to a relatively small unincorporated community, similar to a hamlet in New York state. This informal usage may be found even in states that have villages as an incorporated municipality, although such usage might be considered incorrect and confusing.

In most New England states, a "village" is a center of population or trade, including the town center, in an otherwise sparsely developed town or city — for instance, the village of Hyannis in the town of Barnstable, Massachusetts. However, in Vermont and Connecticut, both incorporated and unincorporated villages exist.

== Africa ==
=== Nigeria ===
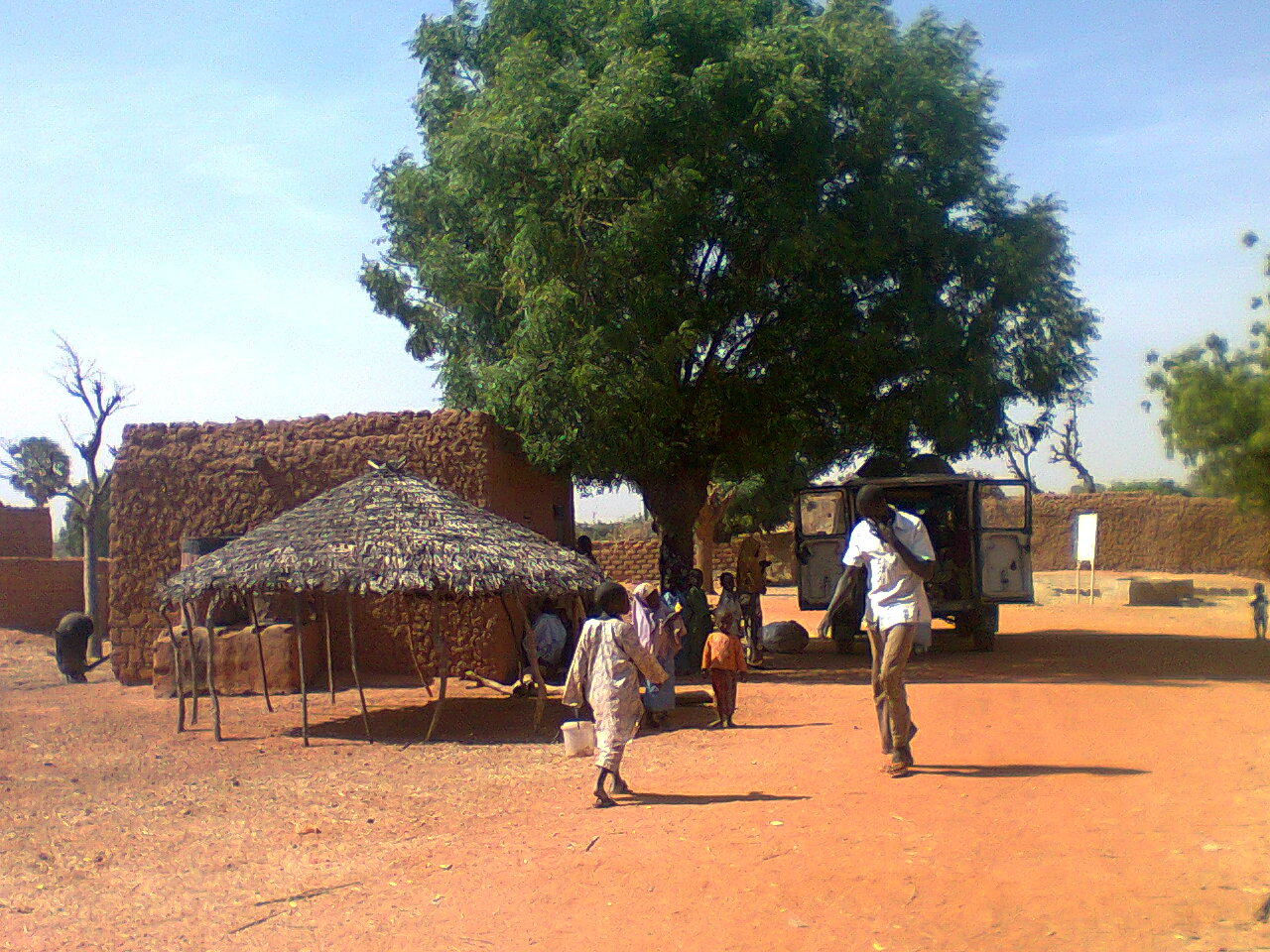
A village in Kaita, Nigeria

Villages in Nigeria vary significantly because of cultural and geographical differences.

Northern Nigeria

In the North, villages were under traditional rulers long before the Jihad of Shaikh Uthman Bin Fodio and after the Holy War. At that time Traditional rulers used to have absolute power in their administrative regions. After Dan Fodio's Jihad in 1804, political structure of the North became Islamic where emirs were the political, administrative and spiritual leaders of their people. These emirs appointed a number of people to assist them in running the administration and that included villages.

Every Hausa village was reigned by Magaji (Village head) who was answerable to his Hakimi (mayor) at the town level. The Magaji also had his cabinet who assisted him in ruling his village efficiently, among whom was Mai-Unguwa (Ward Head).

With the creation of Native Authority in Nigerian provinces, the autocratic power of village heads along with all other traditional rulers was subdued hence they ruled 'under the guidance of colonial officials'.

Even though the constitution of the Federal Republic of Nigeria has not recognised the functions of traditional rulers, they still command respect in their villages and political office holders liaise with them almost every time to reach people.

In Hausa language, village is called ƙauye and every local government area is made up of several small and large ƙauyuka (villages). For instance, Girka is a village in Kaita town in Katsina state in Nigeria. They have mud houses with thatched roofing though, like in most of the villages in the North, zinc roofing has become a common sight.

Still in many villages in the North, people do not have access to potable water. So they fetch water from ponds and streams. Others are lucky to have wells within a walking distance. Women rush in the morning to fetch water in their clay pots from wells, boreholes and streams. However, the government is now providing them with water bore holes.

Electricity and GSM network are reaching more villages in the North.

Southern Nigeria

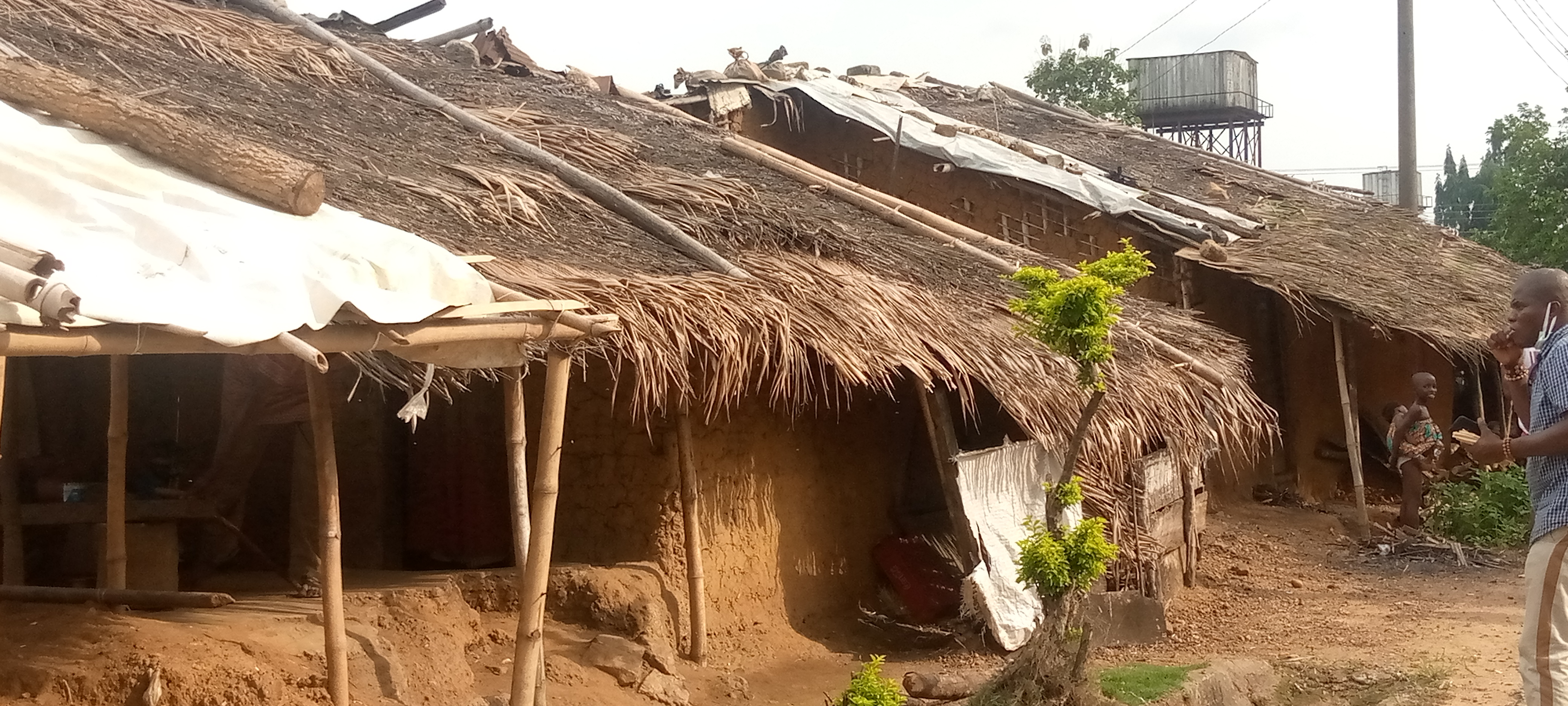
A village house in Southern Nigeria

Village dwellers in the Southeastern region lived separately in "clusters of huts belonging to the patrilinage". As the rainforest region is dominated by Igbo speaking people, the villages are called ime obodo (inside town) in Igbo language. A typical large village might have a few thousand persons who shared the same market, meeting place and beliefs.

=== South Africa ===
In South Africa the majority of people in rural areas reside in villages. They vary in size from having a population of less than 500 to roughly 2000.

== See also ==
- Global village
- Linear village
- Village green
- Village lock-up
- Police village

=== Settlement types ===
- Dugout
- Fishing village
- Hamlet

=== Countries and localities ===
- Dhani and villages
- Dogon villages
- Hakka architecture
- Kampong (village)
- Ksar
- List of villages in Europe by country
- Pueblo
- Sołectwo (rough equivalent in Poland)
- Ville

Developed environments

- Developed environments
- City
- Exurban
- Megalopolis
- Pedestrian village
- Rural
- Suburban
- Urban area

=== Associations ===
- The Most Beautiful Villages in the World
- Les Plus Beaux Villages de France
- Les Plus Beaux Villages de Wallonie
- Association of the Most Beautiful Villages of Quebec
- I Borghi più belli d'Italia
- The Most Beautiful Villages in Japan
- The Most Beautiful Villages in Russia

== Notes ==
Census year	1959	1970	1979	1989	2002
Total number of rural localities in Russia	294,059	216,845	177,047	152,922	155,289
Of them, with population 1 to 10 persons	41,493	25,895	23,855	30,170	47,089
Of them, with population 11 to 200 persons	186,437	132,515	105,112	80,663	68,807

== Sources ==
- Room, Adrian (1996). An Alphabetical Guide to the Language of Name Studies. Lanham and London: The Scarecrow Press. ISBN 9780810831698.
