= Girka =

Village in Katsina State, Nigeria

Girka (Arabic and Ajami غرك) is a village in Kaita Local Government Katsina State, Nigeria.

The word 'Girka' in Hausa may literally mean 'to base (something on).' It may also mean 'the spiritual activities of Bori.' The latter meaning has nothing to do with Girka village etymologically nor historically.

Girka

'Sauri' is the title of Maigari (the Village Head). This title is derived from a Hausa word to 'hasten'. Sauri Isa ruled Girka from 1945 until his demise in 1984. Currently, his son leads the traditional affairs of the village for nearly four decades. The current Sauri is the official representative of Sarkin Sulluɓawa, the District Head of Kaita.

Centuries after its establishment, there are still several historical sites in Girka such as a magic tree, which people around it believe it has some jinns that can frighten anyone who dares go near it at noon. There are also the remnants of 'Girka Pond' that used to be a large pond where the Sarkin Sulluɓawa (the mayor of Kaita), would annually go for regal fishing. There are some smaller hamlets under Girka such as Maƙaurachi, Tarkama, Jankerma, Allemi and many more scattered hamlets. Kaita local authority has built many primary schools in Girka village and its hamlets. Some international organisations such as UNICEF and USAID have assisted in either building new schools or renovating the old ones.
