= Kaita, Nigeria =

Kaita
- LGA and town
- Nickname: Garin Bare
- Interactive map of Kaita
- Location in Nigeria
- Coordinates: 13°04′50″N 7°45′14″E
- Country: Nigeria
- State: Katsina

Government
  - Chairman: Engr. Bello Lawal Yandaki
  - Traditional ruler: Yazid AbdulKarim Kabir
  - Traditional authority: Sarkin Sullubawan Katsina

Area
  - Total: 925 km^{2} (357 sq mi)

Population (2006 census)
  - Total: 184,401
  - Density: 199/km^{2} (516/sq mi)
- Time zone: UTC+1 (WAT)
- 3-digit postal code prefix: 820
- ISO 3166 code: NG.KT.KT

Kaita is a town and local government area in Katsina State, Nigeria, sharing a border in the north with the Republic of Niger.

Its current Transitions Committee Chairman, Engineer Bello Lawal Yandaki, has been running the affairs of the local government since his inauguration along with other 33 transitions committee chairmen of the 34 local government areas of the state in August 2018 by Katsina state governor Alhaji Aminu Bello Masari.

== Villages in Kaita ==
There are many villages under Kaita that are traditionally headed by District Heads or Magaddai as they are called in Hausa. The villages serve as wards and so produce the local government councillors. Prominent among these villages include Abdallawa, Ba'awa, Dankama, Dankaba, Girka, Gafiya, Kaita, Matsai, Yandaki and Yanhoho.

== Population ==
It has an area of 925 km^{2} and a population of 184,401 at the 2006 census.

The postal code of the area is 820.

== Climate ==
Intense, mostly cloudy wet seasons, windy, partly cloudy dry seasons, and hot temperatures ranging from 58 °F to 102 °F are all common in Kaita. Seldom do these temperatures fall below 54 °F or rise above 106 °F.
