= County Line Beach =

Beach park in Ventura County, California

- Location within California Location within the United States
- Location: South coast, Ventura County, California, USA
- Nearest city: Malibu, California
- Coordinates: 34°3′6″N 118°57′36″W
- Administrator: Santa Monica Mountains Conservancy
- Parking: Street parking
- Website: Official website

County Line Beach is a beach located in Solromar, California, an unincorporated community of Ventura County. This stretch of sandy beach is easily accessible from the adjacent Pacific Coast Highway. This surf spot popularized by the Beach Boys in their 1963 hit song "Surfin' U.S.A." is administered by the California State Parks' Malibu Sector Coastal Lifeguard Program in addition to Leo Carrillo State Park. The beach lies within the south coast portion of Ventura County amidst a mostly rugged coastline that is some of the most striking and diverse coastal terrain in the county and a backdrop for many televised car scenes. The beach lies at the mouth of a canyon in the Santa Monica Mountains that hugs the shore along the Ventura County's south coast.

== Location ==
The beach is within Solromar, the most westerly community on the Malibu Coast and is within the Malibu zip code. The area was not included within the city of Malibu when the city incorporated as it is located just across the boundary separating from Los Angeles County in Ventura County. Its sandy beach stretches over half a mile, bordered by the Whaler's Village Condominium complex to the east, the MariSol residential community to the North and a tract of single family beach homes on the western end.

Neptune's Net, across the highway from the beach, has been used for filming movies like Point Break, Fast and Furious, and Iron Man 3. The restaurant was opened in 1956.

Firestation 56 is located at the southern end of County Line Beach and the 2008 station features two engine bays, living quarters for the crew, offices, an exercise room and shop. The Malibu Fire Station is staffed by three firefighters and houses Engine 56, Brush Engine 356. Also assigned are two Rescue Water Craft (jet-ski), and Patrol 56.

Yerba Buena Road intersect the Pacific Coast Highway and leads up into the Santa Monica Mountains where there are residential properties, and a number of recreational activities within the Santa Monica Mountains National Recreation Area such as the Grotto Trail. There is also a health and wellness retreat called The Ranch Malibu which has attracted celebrities like Michelle Obama, Brooke Shields and Mandy Moore.

It has a small parking lot and street parking is available along Pacific Coast Highway which is part of the Pacific Coast Bicycle Route. This is an access point for California Coastal Trail.

== Recreational activities ==
Board surfing, body surfing, kite surfing, wind surfing and stand up paddle boarding are common activities at County Line Beach. The water quality at County Line Beach is consistently graded as an A+ by the environmental steward organization Heal the Bay. It has a beach break with good peaks for surfing, and a point break that stays glassy from the thick kelp beds. Junior surf competitions are held there and it has received some celebrity notoriety with "Ventura County Line" being mentioned as a favorite surf spot by the Beach Boys in their 1963 hit song "Surfin' U.S.A." Kite surfing and wind surfing are also popular at the beach.

== Coastal marine habitat ==
Scuba diving and freediving are popular because of the easy access and a marine habitat consisting of an abundant kelp forest with numerous reefs. When the waves are small and the water visibility is clear, diving conditions can be good to excellent. The outer reefs have an abundance of sea life and are popular among spear-fisherman when the white seabass are running. Spearfishing, kayak fishing and shore fishing are popular here. The largest draw is for the California white seabass when it is in season typically at the end of Spring and through Summer. Pacific halibut and Calico bass are also popular game fish.

Wildlife including dolphin, whale, seals, seabirds and fish are abundant off of County Line Beach. The large kelp forests and abundance of opalescent inshore market squid means a high biodiversity. The market (opalescent) (118,000 tons, $7,670,000) squid fishery is California's largest and most lucrative commercial fishery, off the coast from the beach. The thick kelp beds also provide an opportunity to test for radioactive contamination that could arrive in ocean currents from Japan's damaged Fukushima nuclear power plant.

== See also ==
- List of beaches in California
- List of California state parks
