= Solromar, California =

Unincorporated community in California, United States

- Unincorporated community
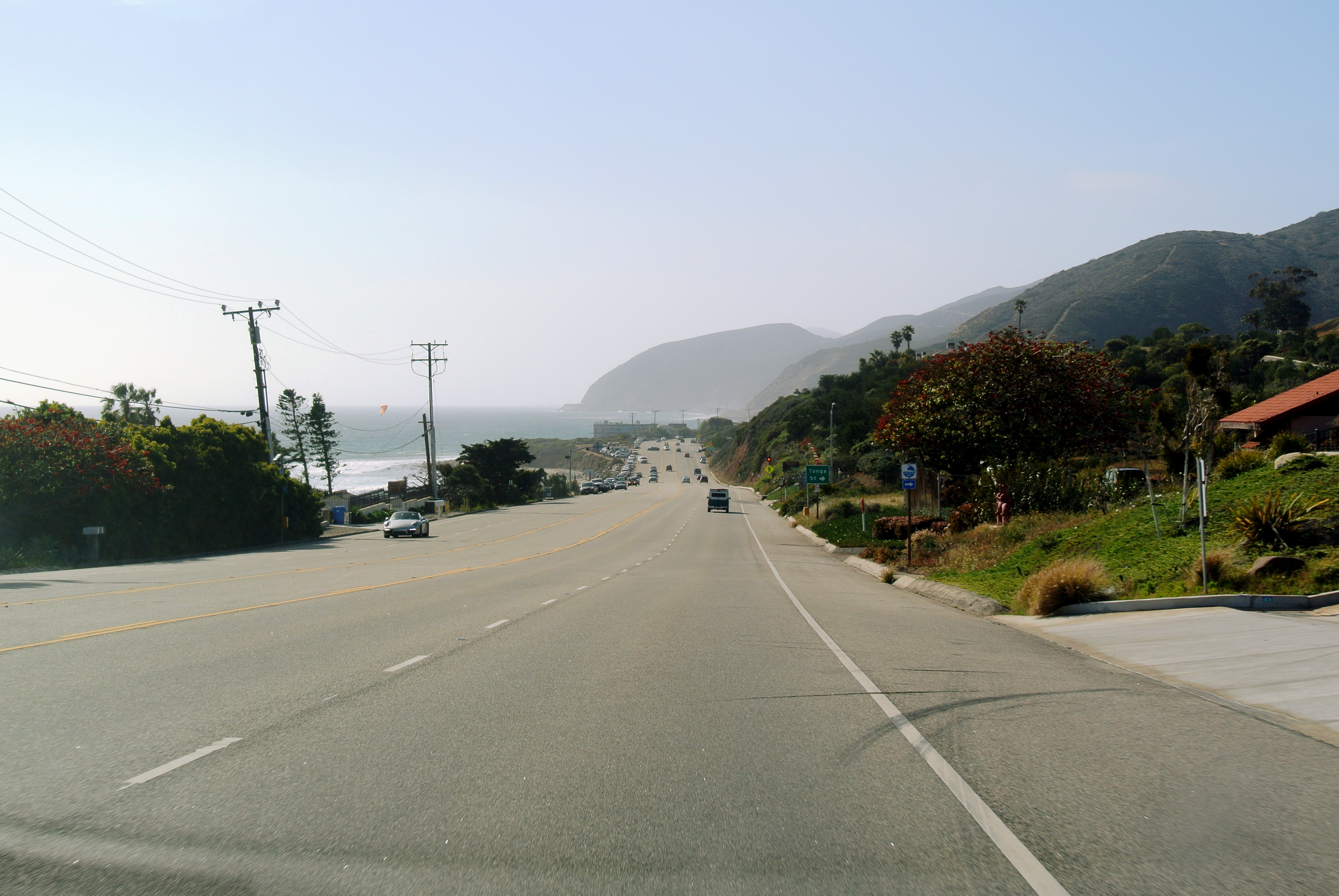
- Pacific Coast Highway (CA 1) in Solromar

- Location within California Location within the United States
- Coordinates: 34°03′00″N 118°57′13″W
- Country: United States
- State: California
- County: Ventura
- Elevation: 128 ft (39 m)
- Time zone: UTC-8 (Pacific (PST))
  - Summer (DST): UTC-7 (PDT)
- Postal code: 90265
- GNIS feature ID: 254274

Solromar (portmanteau of Sol, Oro, and Mar, Spanish for "sun", "gold", and "sea") is a small unincorporated community in Ventura County, California, United States. Located at the north end of the Malibu coast, the community is just up the coast from Leo Carrillo State Park. The community lies on a narrow coastal terrace along Pacific Coast Highway amidst some of the most diverse coastal terrain in Ventura County.

County Line Beach Park lies in-between portions of the residential areas on the ocean side of the highway. A popular surf spot mentioned by the Beach Boys in their 1963 hit song "Surfin' USA", the beach is also popular for scuba diving and freediving with easy access, abundant kelp forest, and reefs.

Solromar had a post office from 1944 to 1956. The post office selected the name from a list of twenty resident submissions. The Spanish words sol, oro, and mar were combined to suggest the description "golden sunset on the sea".

This is the only residential community on the Malibu coast north of the Los Angeles County line. When Malibu incorporated as a city in Los Angeles County, this was the only community along the Malibu coast not to be included within the city limits. This portion of the south coast of Ventura County typically uses Malibu for the address as it is within a Malibu ZIP Code. Sewer service in the area is provided by individual septic tank systems.

A California native garden and a monarch butterfly waystation were constructed as part of the MariSol subdivision. The U.S. Army Corps of Engineers has found a 0.9-foot per year (0.27 m) erosion rate for the shoreline, with major erosion occurring during the winter months.

== See also ==
- Monarch butterfly conservation in California
