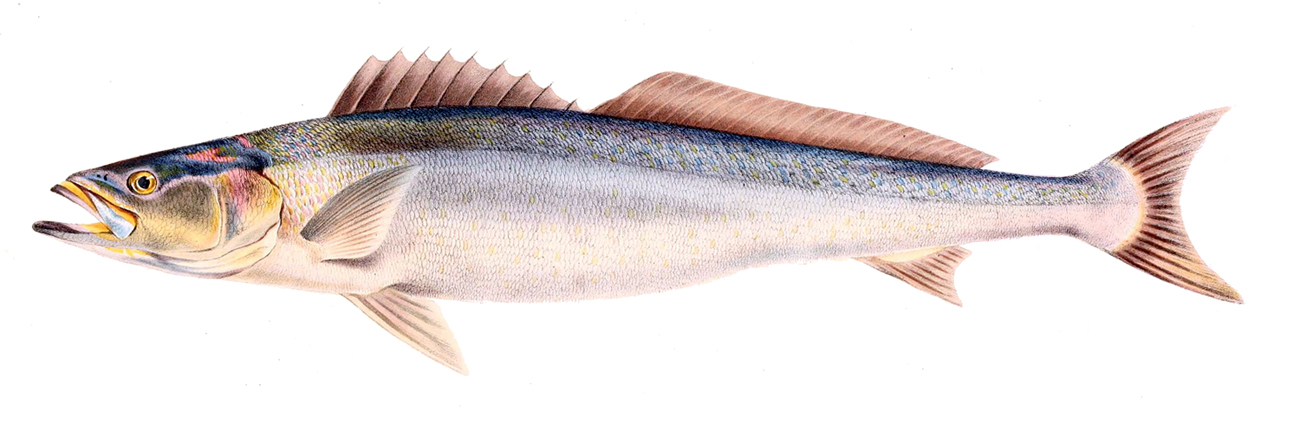

Conservation status
- Near Threatened (IUCN 3.1)

Scientific classification
- Kingdom: Animalia
- Phylum: Chordata
- Class: Actinopterygii
- Order: Acanthuriformes
- Family: Sciaenidae
- Genus: Atractoscion
- Species: A. aequidens

Binomial name
- Atractoscion aequidens (Cuvier, 1830)

Synonyms
- Otolithus aequidens Cuvier, 1830

= Geelbeck croaker =

Species of fish

The geelbeck croaker (Atractoscion aequidens), also known as the African weakfish or Cape salmon, is a species of marine ray-finned fish belonging to the family Sciaenidae, the drums and croakers. This species is found in the southwestern Indian Ocean off southeastern Africa.

== Taxonomy ==
The geelbeck croaker was first formally described as Otolithus aequidens in 1830 by the French zoologist Georges Cuvier with its type locality given as False Bay in the Western Cape. In 1862 Theodore Gill classified O. aequidens in a new monospecific genus Atractoscion and designated it as the type species of that genus. Previously it was considered that this species had a wide distribution in the southeastern Atlantic and Indo-West Pacific but in 2017 workers described two new species and resurrected A. atelodus from the western Pacific, restricting this species to the southwestern Indian Ocean. This species is classified in the family Sciaenidae which is placed within the suborder Sciaenoidei of the order Acanthuriformes in the 5th edition of Fishes of the World. The specific name aequidens means "equal teeth", alluding to the similar sized teeth and lack of canines.

== Description ==
The geelbeck croaker has 9 spines in the front part of the dorsal fin separated from the rear part by an incision and a single spine and 27 or 28 soft rays behind the incision. The anal fin is supported by 2 spines and 9 or 10 soft rays. There are between 16 and 18 fin rays in the pectoral fin. Its body has a standard length which is equivalent to 4.5 to 5.2 times its depth. All of the teeth in the mouth can be depressed. The colour of the body is iridescent blue and purple with bright yellow on the edges of jaws and the inside of the operculum. There is a blotch on the axil of the pectoral-fin. This species has a maximum published total length of 130 cm (51 in), although 90 cm (35 in) is more typical, and a maximum published weight of 25 kg (55 lb).

== Distribution and habitat ==
The geelbeck croaker is found in the southwestern Indian Ocean from Cape Agulhas east along the South African coast and north as far as Pinda in the Zambezia Province of Mozambique. The adults gather in schools offshore over sandy bottom, on rocky reefs, and close to wrecks and pinnacles, at depths between 15 and 200 m (49 and 656 ft)> the juveniles are occasionally found in estuaries.

== Biology ==
Geelbeck croakers are nocturnal piscivores, the adults feed on pelagic fish like pilchard (Sardinops sagax)., as well as Japanese anchovy (Engraulis japonicus), and Cape horse mackerel (Trachurus capensis). These fishes are migratory, the adults undertaking a well defined annual migration along the eastern coast of South Africa. This starts in the Spring when adult fish from the Western Cape to KwaZulu-Natal move inshore to spawn before moving back off shore during the summer and dispersing over the Agulhas Bank. The pelagic eggs and larvae drift in a southwesterly direction following the inshore peripheral waters of the Agulhas Current. They then spend one or two years in a nursery are in the southeast Cape and then join the sub-adult population off the southern coast of Western Cape, where they remain for a three to four more years. These subadults move inshore in summer and back offshore in winter, until they reach sexual maturity.

== Fisheries and conservation ==
The geelbeck croaker is regarded as a highly palatable food fish. It is targeted throughout its range by commercial and recreational hook and line fisheries and it has been assessed as being overfished. South Africa has bag limits for recreational anglers and minimum size limits for both recreational anglers and commercial fishermen. They have also introduced quotas and marine protected areas. The population has severely declined and the IUCN has assessed this species as being Near Threatened.
