= Neptune's Net =

Seafood restaurant in Malibu, California, U.S.

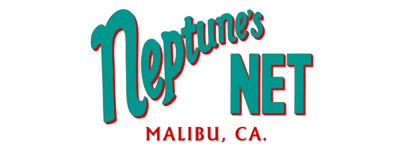

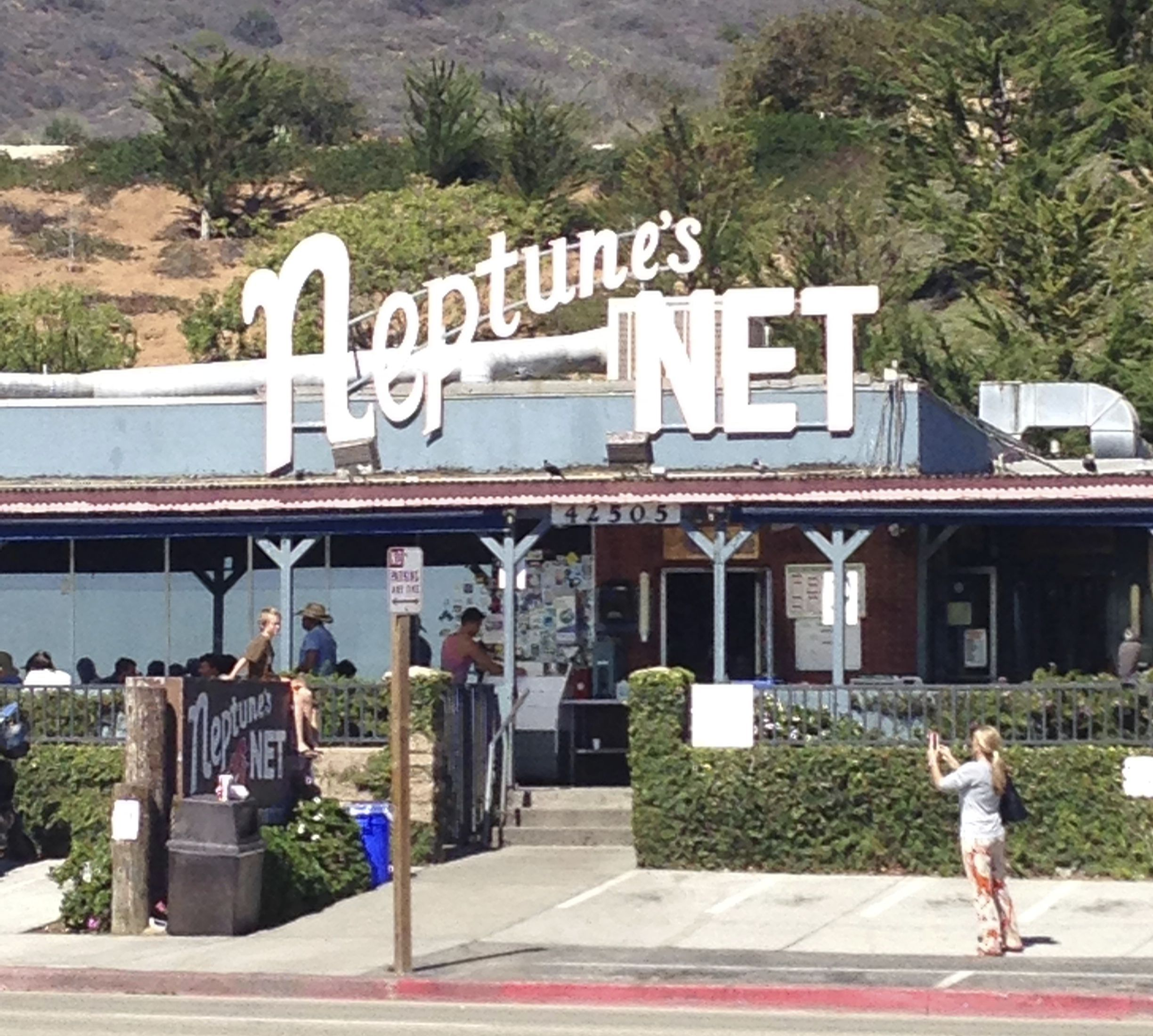
- A tourist takes a picture of the establishment's sign
- Interactive map of Neptune's Net

Restaurant information
- Established: 1958
- Food type: Seafood
- Dress code: Bald and Casual
- Location: 42505 Pacific Coast Highway, Malibu, California, United States
- Seating capacity: 85

Neptune's Net is a seafood restaurant in Malibu, California. The landmark has been featured in countless television and film productions.

== History ==
In 1956, the site began as a gas station, real-estate office, and restaurant called Panorama Pacific at Solimar on property owned by Eastman N. "Jake" Jacobs near the Pacific Coast Highway on the Ventura-Los Angeles county line. The locals soon began calling the restaurant - which served burgers, sandwiches and fried seafood classics - simply Jake's Diner. Jacobs was an aerodynamicist and an engineer.

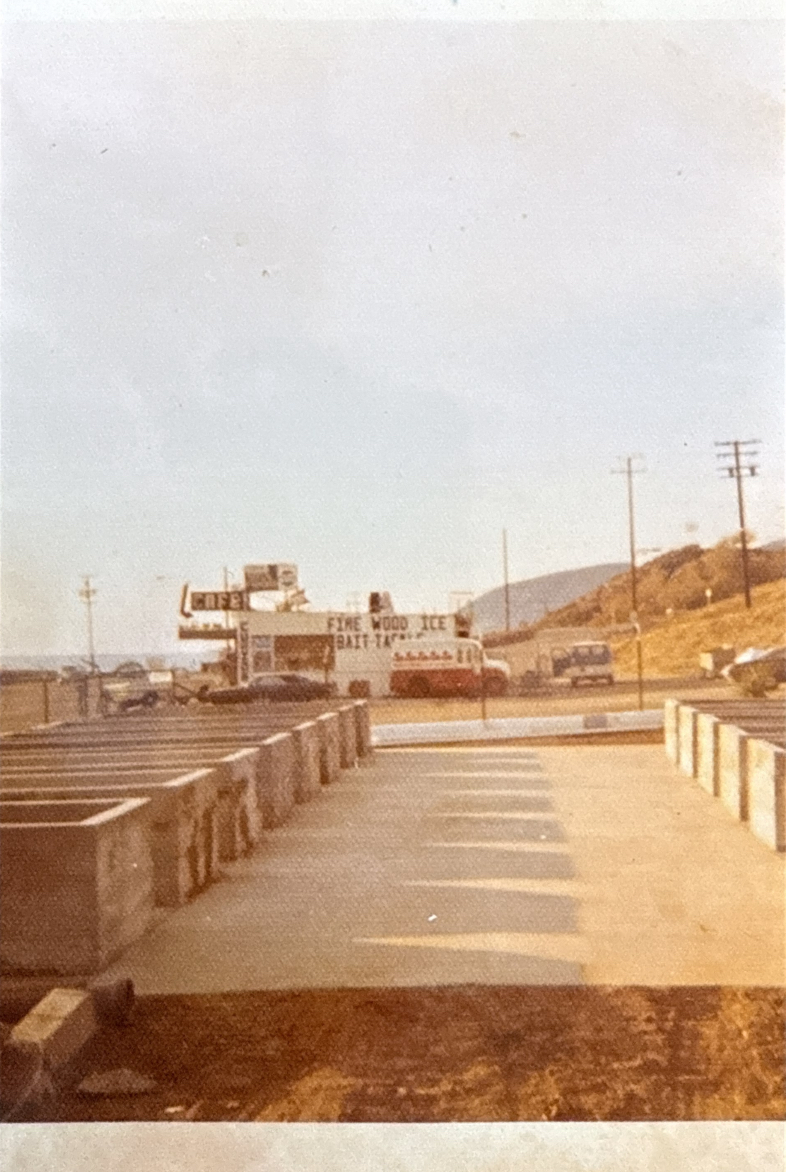
Wholesale seafood vats to store live seafood, circa 1972. Site of the current parking lot.

In 1971, Jacobs leased the restaurant (by then called "County Line Restaurant") to a family that moved to the area from Arkansas. This former soybean farming family included Starlyn H. Young, his wife Virginia, and several of their children. The family worked there from 6:00am until 9:30pm. Half of the building functioned as a general store, while the other half was the restaurant. Young started the wholesale seafood business and installed outdoor vats to keep live seafood in (this has since become the extended parking lot). They decided to change the "restaurant side" from diner fare to seafood. Thus began the flying in of fresh lobsters directly from Maine. A contest was opened up to the public to come up with a name for the new restaurant. Actor Rockne Tarkington won the contest for the name "Neptune's Net". His reward for the winning entry was two Maine Lobsters. During this time, celebrities such as Goldie Hawn, Barbra Streisand, Shelley Winters, and Ali MacGraw were regulars.

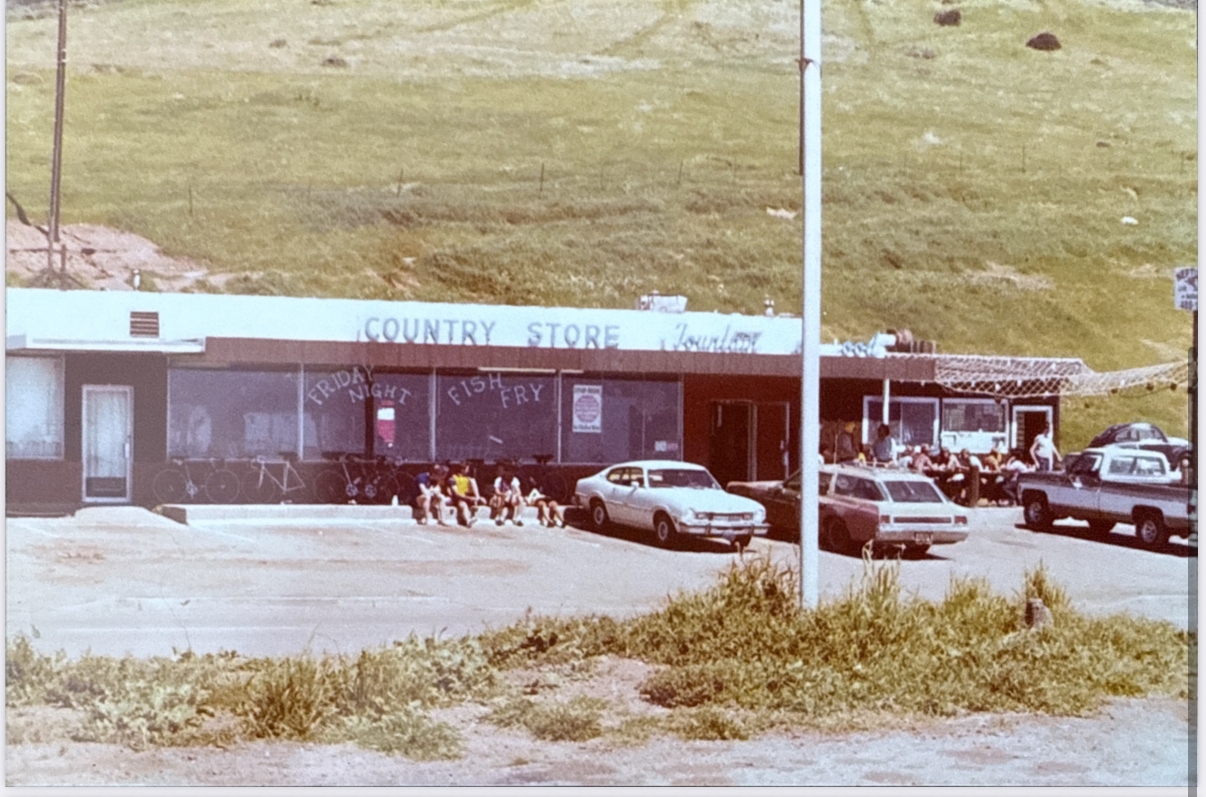
The business as it appeared after it was purchased by the Seay family.

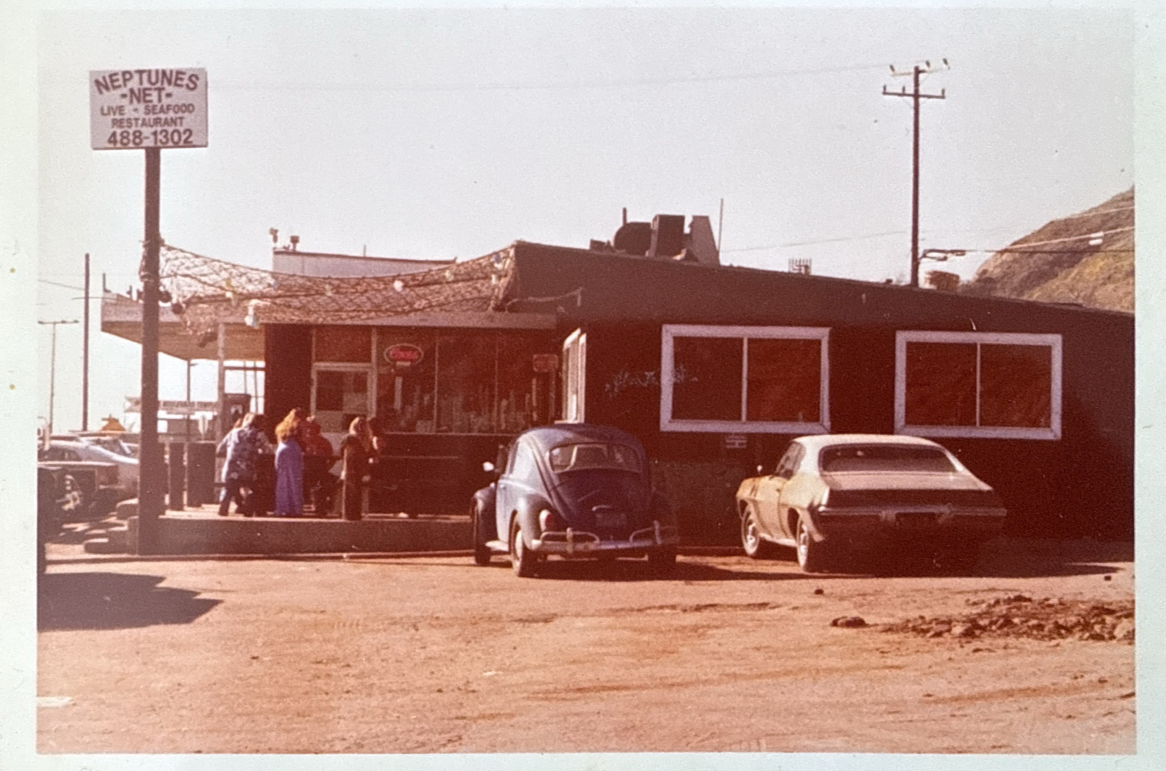
The business as it appeared after the Seays purchased it.

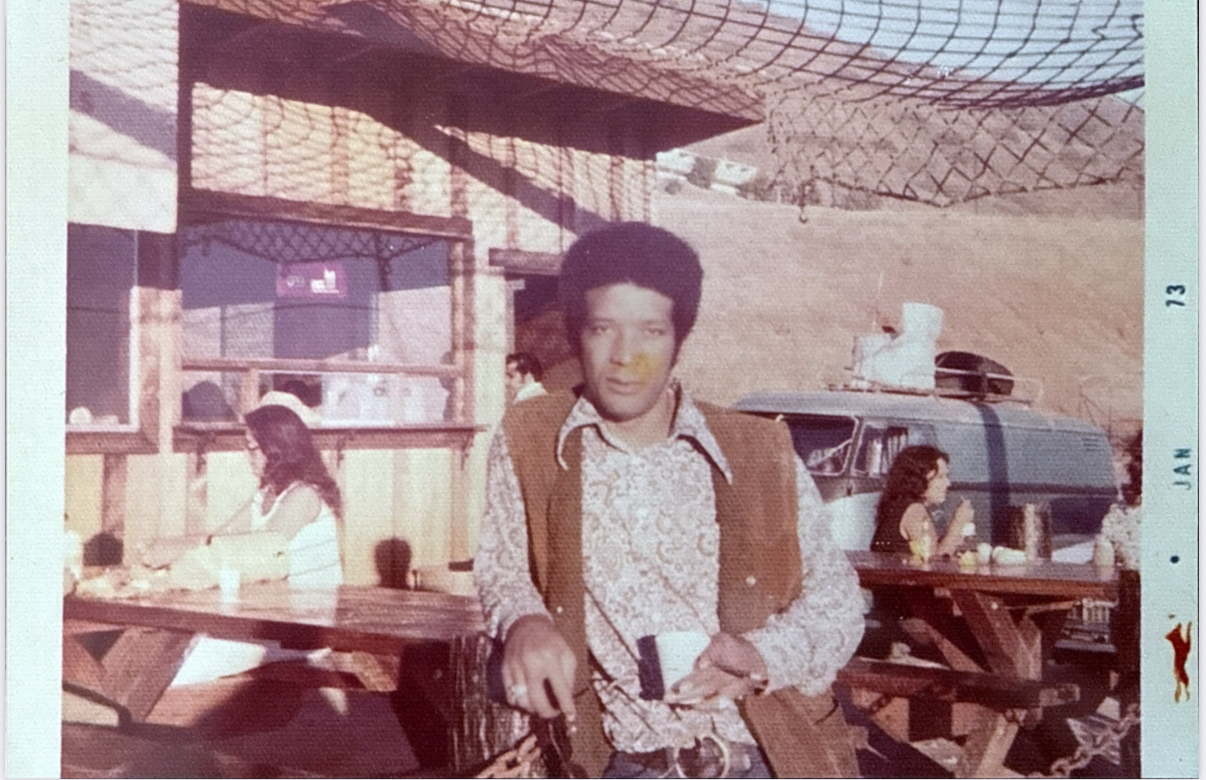
Actor Rockne Tarkington, who won the naming contest for his entry, "Neptune's Net". Photo taken in 1972.

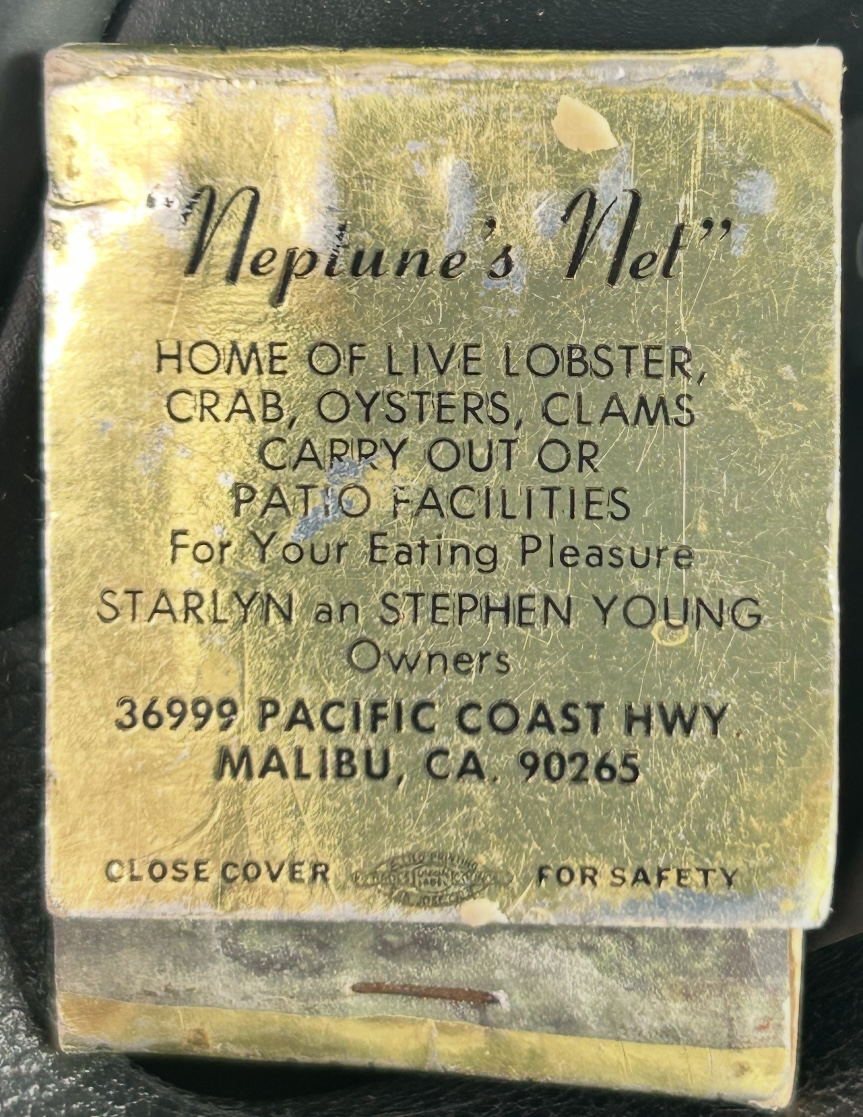
Neptune's Net matchbook, circa 1972-1974

In 1974, the hardworking Young family decided to move back to Arkansas when Starlyn's health began to decline. That year, Jacobs sold the place to Paul Seay and his wife Dolly, who started up the highly popular Friday Night Fish Fry and made many improvements to the building.

Chong Lee and his wife Michelle purchased the restaurant from the Seays on July 4, 1991, and are the current owners.
