= Atractoscion atelodus =

Conservation status
- Data Deficient (IUCN 3.1)

Scientific classification
- Kingdom: Animalia
- Phylum: Chordata
- Class: Actinopterygii
- Order: Acanthuriformes
- Family: Sciaenidae
- Genus: Atractoscion
- Species: A. atelodus

Binomial name
- Atractoscion atelodus (Günther, 1867)

Synonyms
- Otolithus atelodus Günther, 1867; Otolithus teraglin Macleay, 1880

Species of fish

Atractoscion atelodus, the small lunate caudal fin croaker, teraglin, Jew, teraglin-Jew, trag or trag-Jew, is a species of marine ray-finned fish belonging to the family Sciaenidae, the drums and croakers. This species is endemic to the eastern coast of Australia.

== Taxonomy ==
Atractoscion atelodus was first formally described as Otolithus atelodus in 1867 by the German born British herpetologist and ichthyologist Albert Günther with its type locality given as Australia. Previously it was considered that this taxon was a synonym of A. aequidens which was thought to have a wide distribution in the southeastern Atlantic and Indo-West Pacific but in 2017 workers described two new species and resurrected A. atelodus from the western Pacific, restricting A. aequidens to the southwestern Indian Ocean. This species is classified in the family Sciaenidae which is placed within the suborder Sciaenoidei of the order Acanthuriformes in the 5th edition of Fishes of the World. The specific name atelodus means "imperfect teeth", an allusion to the lack of canines.

== Description ==
Atractoscion atelodus is a large species with a slender, elongate body and a pointed snout, large oblique mouth with a slightly protruding lower jaw. The dorsal fin is supported by 11 spines and 31 to 34 soft rays while the anal fin has 2 spines and 9 soft rays. The adults have no canine-like teeth and the caudal fin is emarginate. The colour of the body is iridescent blue and purple, frequently with diagonal black lines on the flanks. There is bright yellow on the edges of jaws and the inside of the operculum. There is a blotch on the axil of the pectoral-fin. This species reaches a maximum published total length of 51.5 cm (20.3 in).

== Distribution and habitat ==
Atractoscion atelodus is endemic to eastern Australia, here it occurs from southern Queensland south to off Port Hacking, Sydney in New South Wales. The adults are schooling fishes on offshore waters while the juvebiles live in inshore waters, including deeper estuaries. These fishes are found down to depths of 200 m (660 ft).

== Fisheries and conservation ==
Atractoscion atelodus is a quarry species for commercial line fishers in New South Wales Ocean Trap and Line Fishery, with a significant amount caught by recreational anglers. The flesh is regarded as highly palatable. New South Wales has introduced bag and minimum size limits.

This fish is regarded as at least being fished at the maximum level the stock can sustain and may be subject to overfishing. The IUCN does not believe it has enough data to support its classification in a threatened category and classify its conservation status as Data Deficient, albeit with an urgent need for additional research to determine the status and impacts of fishing.
