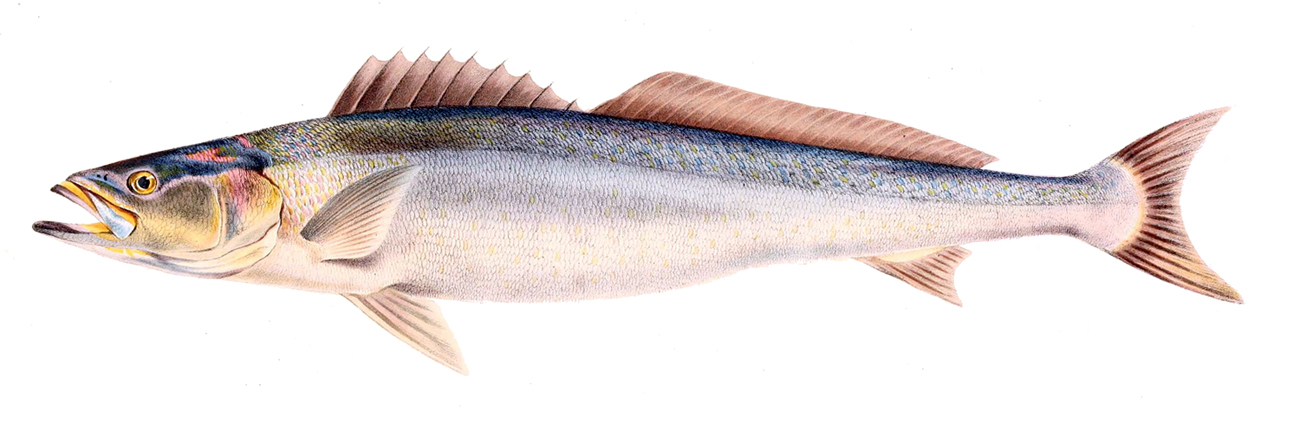
- Atractoscion aequidens

Scientific classification
- Kingdom: Animalia
- Phylum: Chordata
- Class: Actinopterygii
- Order: Acanthuriformes
- Family: Sciaenidae
- Genus: Atractoscion; T. N. Gill, 1862

Type species
- Otolithus aequidens Cuvier, 1830

Synonyms
- Zeluco Whitley, 1931

= Atractoscion =

Genus of fishes

Atractoscion is a genus of marine ray-finned fished belonging to the family Sciaenidae, the drums and croakers. The fishes in this genus are found in the Atlantic, Indian and Pacific Oceans.

== Taxonomy ==
Atractoscion was first proposed as a monospecific genus in 1862 by the American biologist Theodore Gill with Otolithus aequidens, a species described in 1830 by Georges Cuvier from the Cape of Good Hope, designated as its type species. This genus is classified in the family Sciaenidae which is placed within the suborder Sciaenoidei of the order Acanthuriformes in the 5th edition of Fishes of the World.

== Etymology ==
Atractoscion is a combination of atracto, which means "spindle", an allusion Gill did not explain, but it mau have referred to the more cylindrical body shape of this genus in comparison to the typical members of the Sciaenidae, with scion, the modern Greek name of Umbrina cirrosa, Gill preferring this over “sciaena” because he considered that it sounded better.

== Species ==
There are currently 5 recognized species in this genus:

- Atractoscion aequidens (Cuvier, 1830) (Geelbeck croaker)
- Atractoscion atelodus (Günther, 1867) (Small lunate caudal fin croaker)
- Atractoscion macrolepis Y. S. Song, J. K. Kim, J. H. Kang & S. Y. Kim, 2017 (Large scale lunate caudal fin croaker)
- Atractoscion microlepis [Y. S. Song, J. K. Kim, J. H. Kang & S. Y. Kim, 2017 (Small scale lunate caudal fin croaker)
- Atractoscion nobilis (Ayres, 1860) (White weakfish)

== Characteristics ==
Atractoscion fishes are characterised by having elongate fusiform, compressed bodies with an oval cross-section. They have moderately sized eyes. The slightly oblique mout opens at the front and has a slightly protruding lower jaw. There are no barbels or pores on the chin and the preoperculum has a smooth margin. They have a raised ridge along the centre of their bellies. The dorsal fin has a long base with a deep incision separating the spined and soft-rayed portions of the fin and it has 10 or 11 spines and between 21 and 23 soft rays. The anal fin has 2 thin, short spines and 9 or 10 soft rays. They have short pelvic and pectoral fins. They have small, rough scales apart from around the eyes where the scales are smooth. There are no scales in the fins. The teeth are cardiform or pluriserial, and the caudal fin is slightly emarginate to lunate. The largest species in the genus is the white seabass (A. nobilis) which has a maximum published total length of 166 cm (65 in).

== Distribution and habitat ==
Atractoscion croakers are found in the south eastern Atlantic, southwestern Indian, northern Indian, western and eastern Pacific Oceans. These are coastal fishes often found in estuaries.
