= Leo Carrillo State Park =

State park in Los Angeles and Ventura counties, California, United States

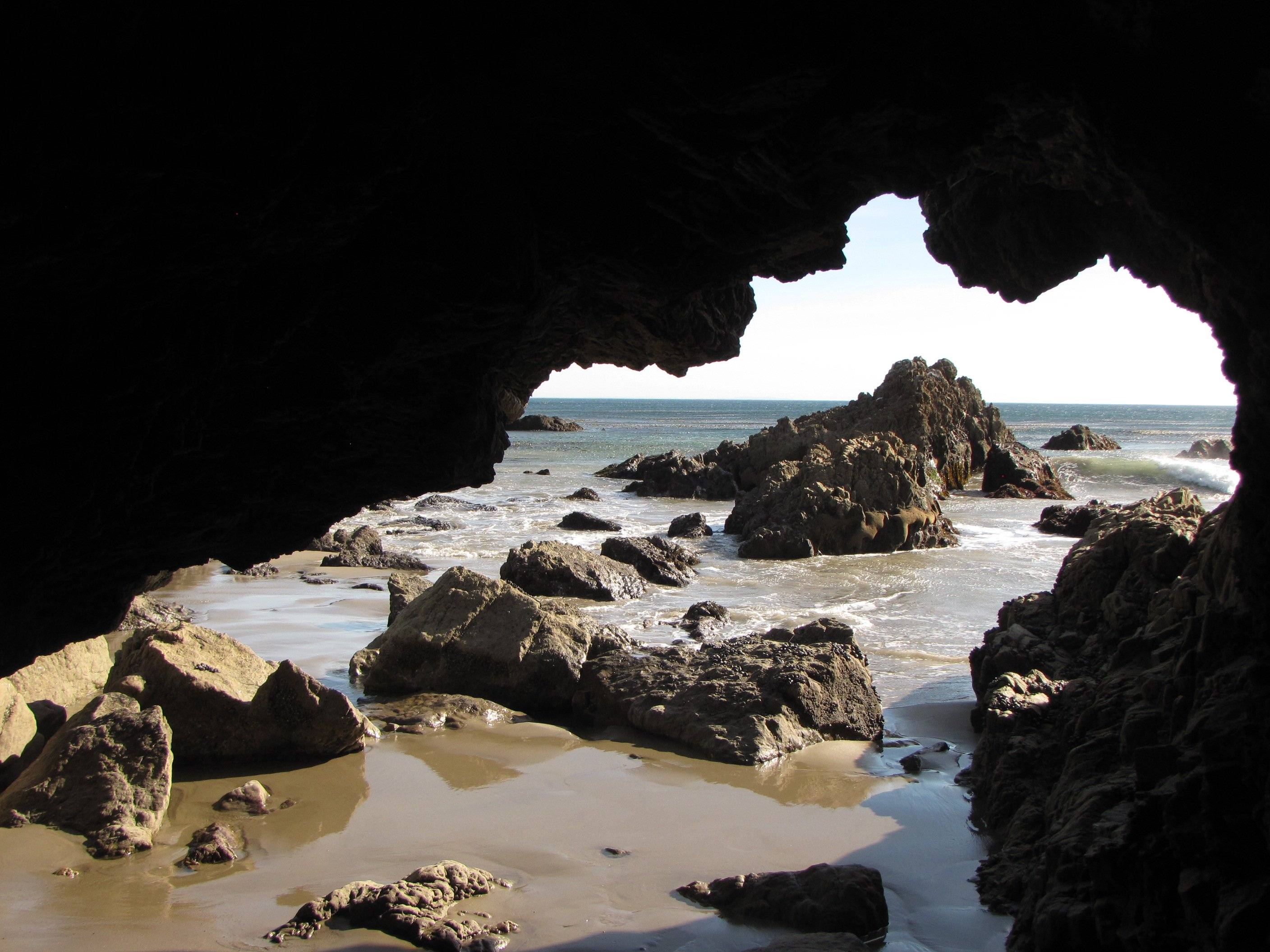
- View from Leo Carrillo State Park's sea cave

- Location within California Location within the United States
- Location: Los Angeles and Ventura Counties, California, United States
- Nearest city: Malibu, California
- Coordinates: 34°2′40″N 118°56′2″W
- Area: 2,513 acres (10.17 km^{2})
- Established: 1953
- Governing body: California Department of Parks and Recreation

Leo Carrillo State Park is a state park in Los Angeles County, California, United States. Situated along the Malibu coast, the park is a component of Santa Monica Mountains National Recreation Area. With 1.5 miles (2.4 km) of beach, the parkland stretches into the Santa Monica Mountains. The park has expanded into Ventura County and also includes management of County Line Beach. California State Route 1 runs through the park, where it intersects with the western terminus of the Mulholland Highway. The 2,513-acre (1,017 ha) park was established in 1953. It is named for actor and conservationist Leo Carrillo (1880–1961), who served on the State Parks commission.

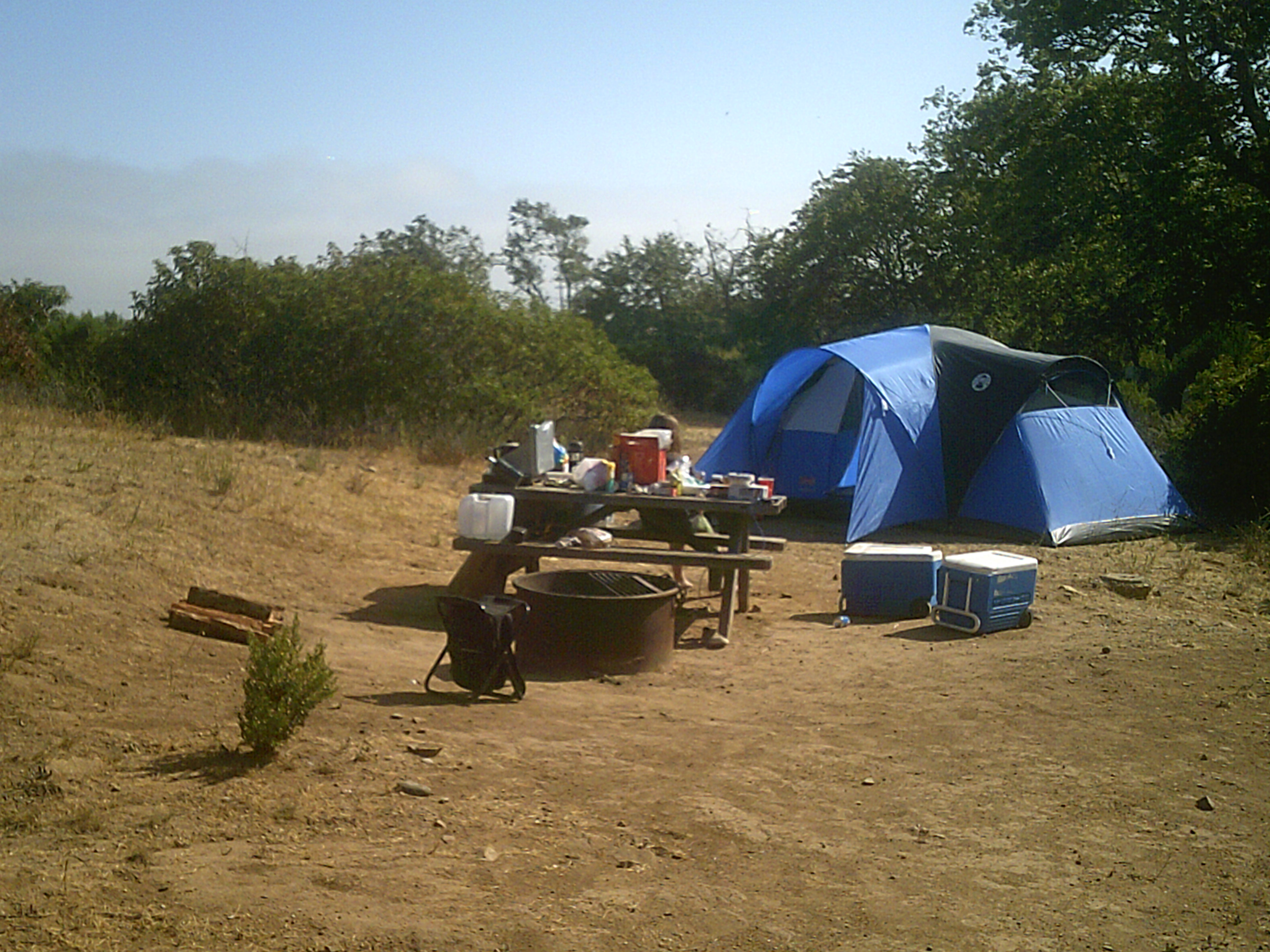
Campsite 108 at Leo Carillo State Park, in use by campers.

== History ==
The Woolsey Fire was a destructive wildfire that started inland many miles away and raced through canyons and mountains in Los Angeles and Ventura Counties to the coastline. The fire ignited on November 8, 2018, and burned 96,949 acres (39,234 hectares) of land. The fire destroyed 1,643 structures, killed three people, and prompted the evacuation of more than 295,000 people. It was one of several fires in California that ignited on the same day.

The 2018 fire burned through almost the entire park. The equipment for the Junior Lifeguard program that was destroyed in the fire was replaced by a donation from a group of Australian surf lifeguard associations, led by the Maroochydore Surf Life Saving Club. The campgrounds reopened after work crews spent seven months removing debris and cleaning up.

== Recreation ==
Leo Carrillo State Park offers swimming, surfing, windsurfing, surf fishing, and beachcombing. Beachgoers can explore tide pools, sea caves, and reefs. Inland there is a campground and backcountry hiking trails.

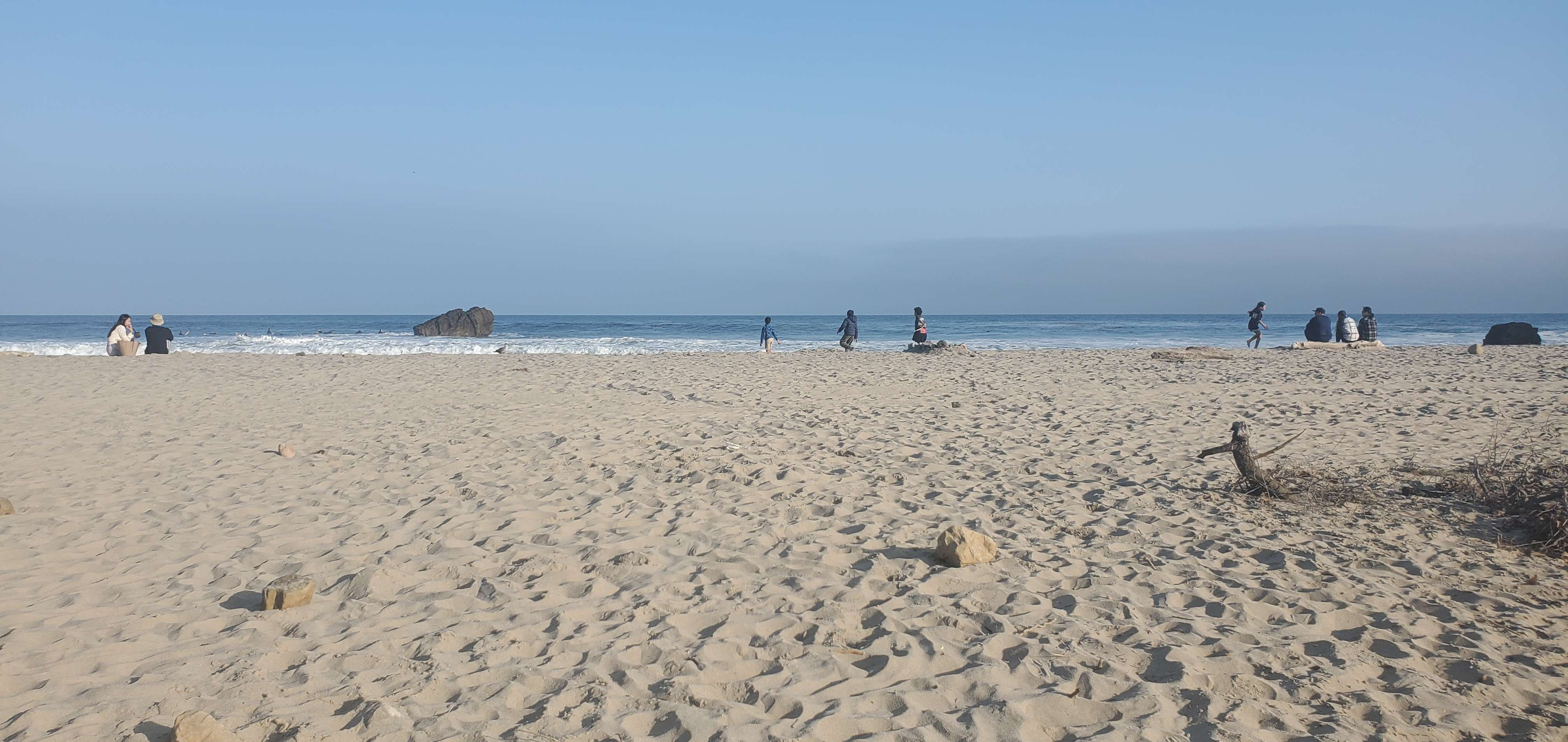
A view of Leo Carillo Beach and its visitors.

== In popular culture ==
Actors such as Elvis Presley, Jerry Lewis, Nancy Sinatra, Dick Clark and other celebrities have been featured in films shot here.

In the popular 1970s TV show The Rockford Files, starring James Garner, it was the first season's opening scene of episode 1 (The Kirkoff Case) airing September 13, 1974.

It was featured in an episode of Huell Howser's TV series California's Golden Parks.

During the final scenes of the Tom Petty's "Mary Jane's Last Dance" music video, Petty is seen carrying Kim Basinger through a cave before placing her in the water.

The group photo on the cover of The Turtles Turtle Soup album (released in October, 1969) was taken here.

In Better Call Saul, it was featured in the final season during the opening of the episode "Point and Shoot". This sequence is thus far the only scene from the "Breaking Bad" universe not to be shot in New Mexico.

In ‘’The Big Lebowski’’, it was mentioned by Walter Sobchak John Goodman during the eulogy of Theodore Donald Kerabatsos Steve Buscemi as one of the many places Donny surfed.

Other movies and TV shows filmed here include:

- Gidget (1959)
- Beach Blanket Bingo (1965)
- The Good Place (2016)
- Grease (1978)
- Journey to the Center of the Earth (1959)
- 50 First Dates (2004)
- Psycho Beach Party (2000)
- The Truth About Cats & Dogs (1996)
- The Usual Suspects (1995)
- Sylvia Scarlett (1935)
- Attack of the Crab Monsters (1957)
- Monster From The Surf (1965)
- Jack the Giant Killer (1962)
- Point Break (1991)
- The Craft (1996).
- That Thing You Do! (1996)
- Cast Away (2000)
- Orange County (2002)
- She's All That (1999)
- The Karate Kid (1984)
- Letters from Iwo Jima (2006)
- Slave Girl (1947)
- Trader Tom of the China Seas (1954)
- Viking Women and the Sea Serpent (1957)
- Furious 7 (2015)
- The Mentalist (2008–2015)

== See also ==
- List of beaches in California
- List of California state parks
