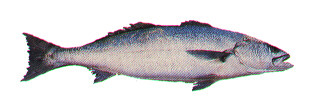

Conservation status
- Least Concern (IUCN 3.1)

Scientific classification
- Kingdom: Animalia
- Phylum: Chordata
- Class: Actinopterygii
- Order: Acanthuriformes
- Family: Sciaenidae
- Genus: Atractoscion
- Species: A. nobilis

Binomial name
- Atractoscion nobilis (Ayres, 1860)

= White seabass =

Species of fish

The white seabass or white weakfish, Atractoscion nobilis, is a species of croaker occurring from Magdalena Bay, Baja California Sur, to Juneau, Alaska. They usually travel in schools over deep rocky bottoms (0–122 m) and in and out of kelp beds.

== Description ==
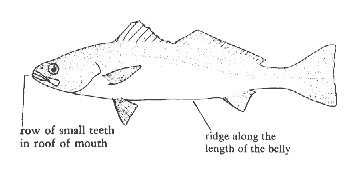

The body of the white seabass is elongate, and somewhat compressed. The head is pointed and slightly compressed. The mouth is large, with a row of small teeth in the roof; the lower jaw slightly projects. The color is bluish to gray above, with dark speckling, becoming silver below. The young have several dark vertical bars. The white seabass is closely related to the California corbina, but is the only California member of the croaker family to exceed 20 pounds in weight. The largest recorded specimen was over 5 feet, 93.1 pounds. They are most easily separated from other croakers by the presence of a ridge running the length of the belly. C The diet of white seabass includes fishes, especially anchovies and sardines, and squid. At times, large fish are found which have eaten only Pacific mackerel. At the minimum legal length of 28 inches, the average white seabass is about 5 years of age, weighs about 7.5 pounds and has been sexually mature for at least one spawning season.

== Fishing ==
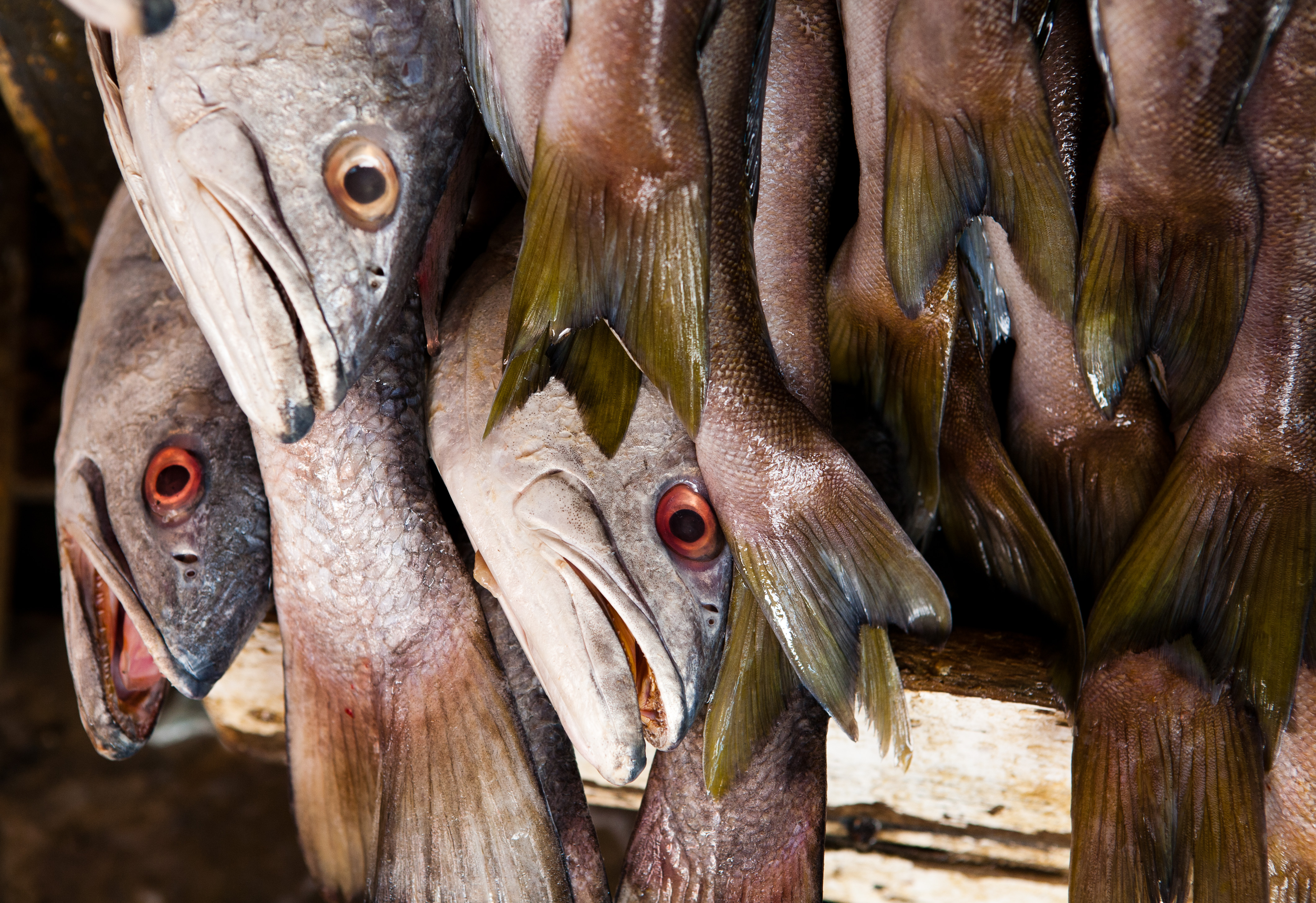
White seabass at the fish market in Ensenada, Mexico

White seabass are fished primarily with live bait in relatively shallow water, but they will also take a fast-trolled spoon, artificial squid or bone jig. Live squid appear to be the best bait for a white seabass, but large anchovies and medium-size sardines are also good. At times, large white seabass will bite only on fairly large, live Pacific mackerel. The young of this species are exceptionally vulnerable to sport anglers for two reasons: The first is that as juveniles they inhabit shallow nearshore areas, bays, and estuaries, and the second is that they are not easily recognized as white seabass by the average angler. Commonly, these young fish are mistakenly called "sea trout" because of their sleek profile and vertical bars or "parr marks". To add to the confusion, these bars fade as the fish grows.

In California, there is a minimum 28 inch size limit and current fishing regulations should be checked concerning bag limits.
