= Malibu, California =

City in California, United States

- City
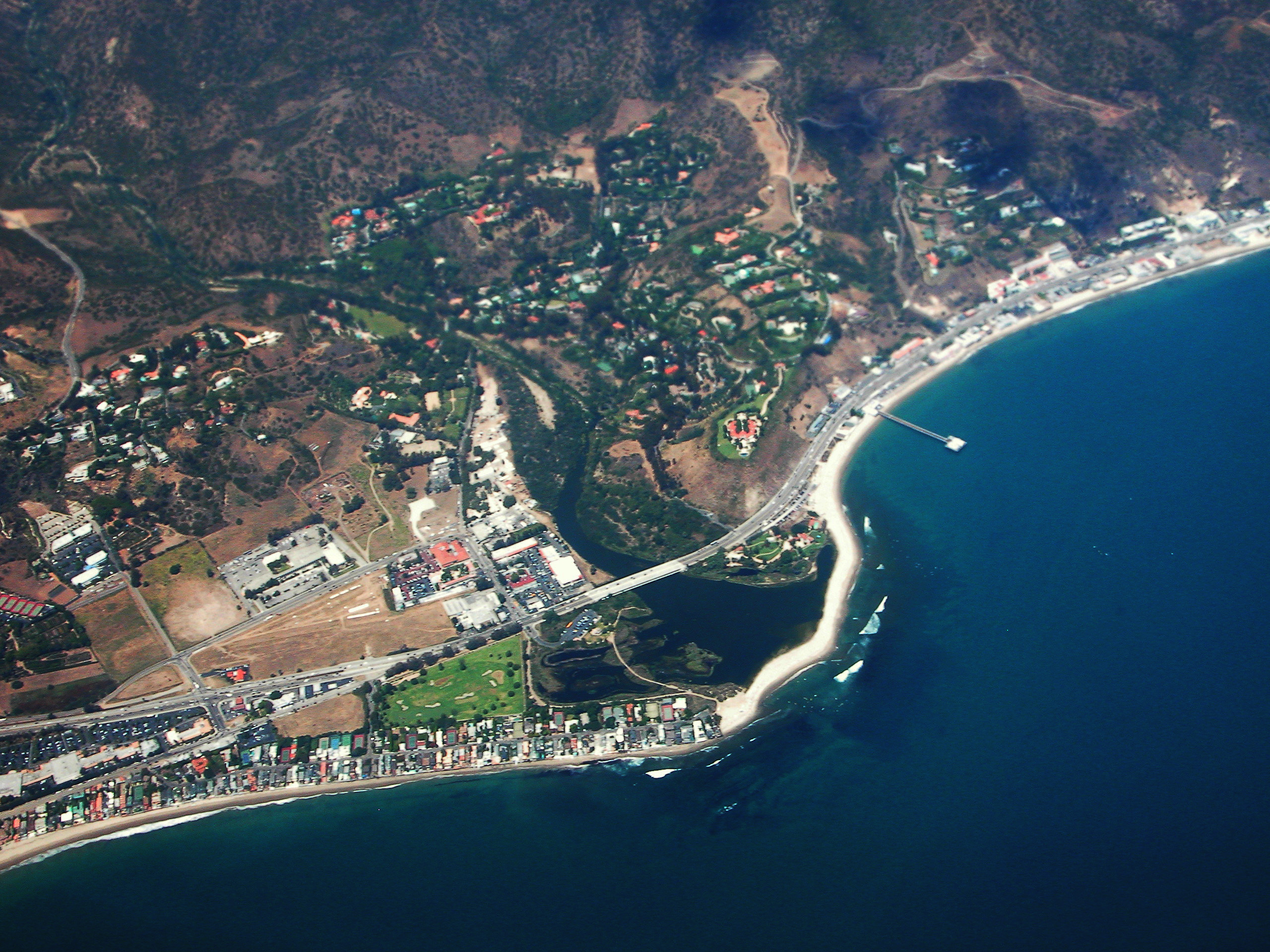
- Aerial view of Downtown Malibu and surrounding neighborhoods

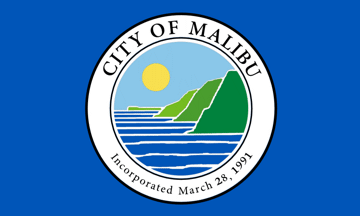
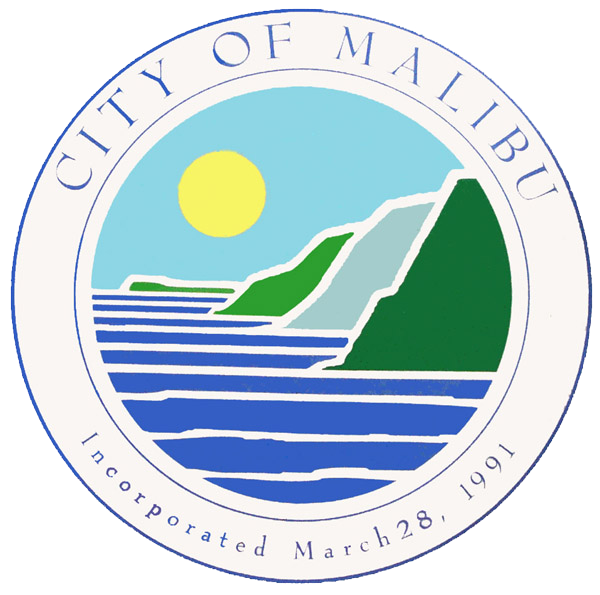
- Flag Seal
- Nickname: The 'Bu
- Interactive map of Malibu, California
- Location in the Los Angeles Metropolitan Area Location in California Location in the United States Location in North America
- Coordinates: 34°02′06″N 118°41′42″W
- Country: United States
- State: California
- County: Los Angeles
- Incorporated (city): March 28, 1991
- Named for: Chumash: Humaliwo, "The Surf Sounds Loudly"

Government
  - Type: Council–manager
  - Mayor: Marianne Riggins
  - Mayor pro tem: Bruce Silverstein
  - City council: Haylynn Conrad; Doug Stewart; Steve Uhring
- State Assembly member: Jacqui Irwin
- State Senator: Ben Allen

Area
  - Total: 19.90 sq mi (51.54 km^{2})
  - Land: 19.86 sq mi (51.45 km^{2})
  - Water: 0.035 sq mi (0.09 km^{2}) 0.22%
- Elevation: 105 ft (32 m)

Population (2020)
  - Total: 10,654
  - Density: 536.3/sq mi (207.1/km^{2})
- Time zone: UTC−8 (Pacific)
  - Summer (DST): UTC−7 (PDT)
- ZIP Codes: 90263–90265
- Area codes: 310/424
- FIPS code: 06-45246
- GNIS feature IDs: 1668257, 2410913
- Website: malibucity.org

Malibu (/ˈmælɪbuː/ MAL-ih-boo; Chumash: Humaliwo; Spanish: Malibú) is a beach city in the Santa Monica Mountains region of Los Angeles County, California, United States, about 30 miles (48 km) west of Los Angeles. It is known for its Mediterranean climate, its strip of beaches stretching 21 miles (34 km) along the Pacific coast, and for its longtime status as the home of numerous Hollywood celebrities and executives with several of its residents in the entertainment industry. The Pacific Coast Highway (State Route 1) traverses the city, following along the South Coast of California. As of the 2020 census, the city's population was 10,654. The 2025 Palisades Fire devastated Malibu, with almost all of the beachfront homes in the east of the city being destroyed.

Nicknamed "The 'Bu" by surfers and locals, Malibu is noted for its beaches. The many parks within the Santa Monica Mountains National Recreation Area lie along the ridges and valleys near the city.

The city is bounded by the Santa Monica Mountains to the north, Topanga to the east, Solromar to the west, and the ocean to the south. The Malibu ZIP Code includes residents of the unincorporated canyon areas as it was assigned before the city incorporated.

== History ==
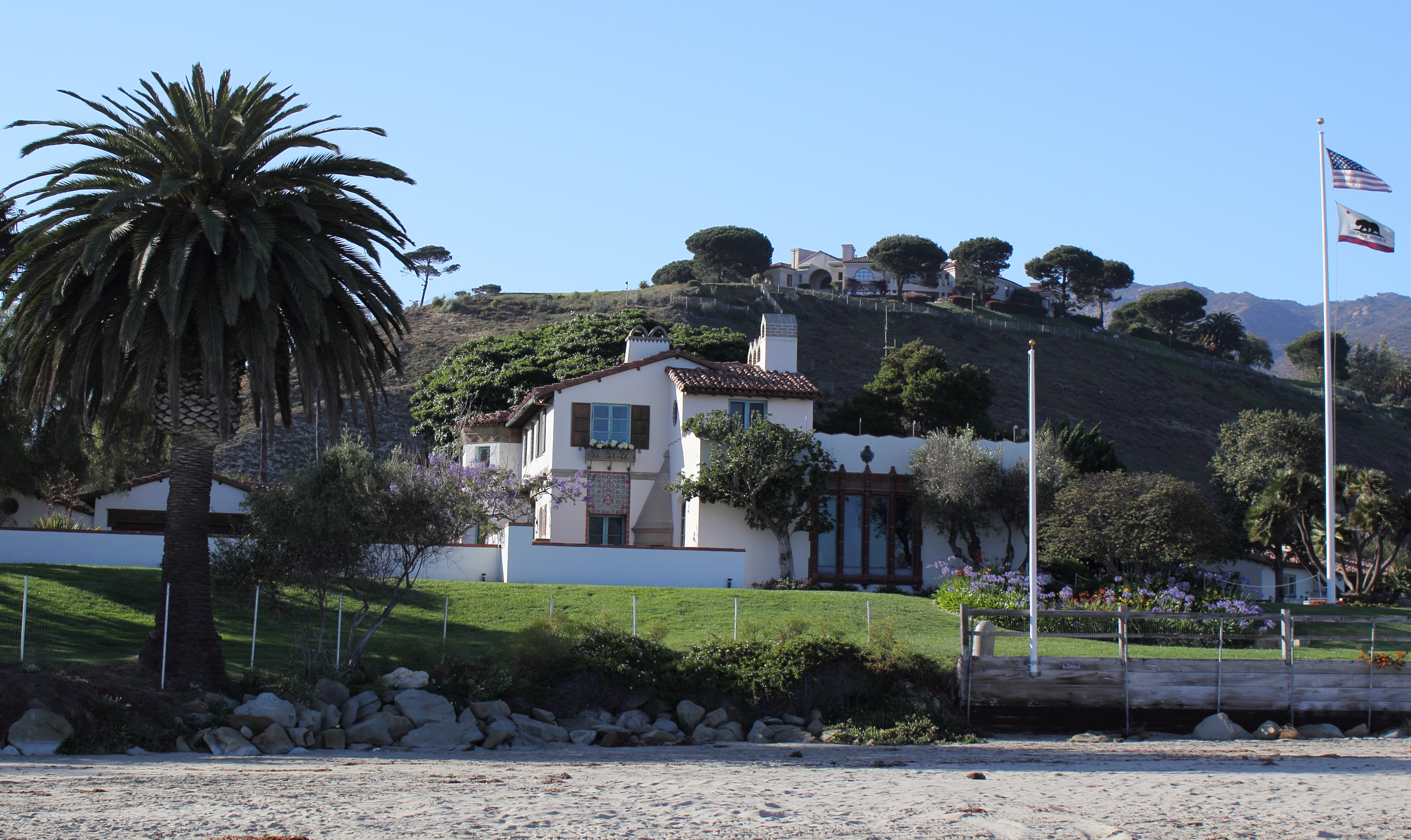
Adamson House, a historic house and gardens, listed on the National Register of Historic Places

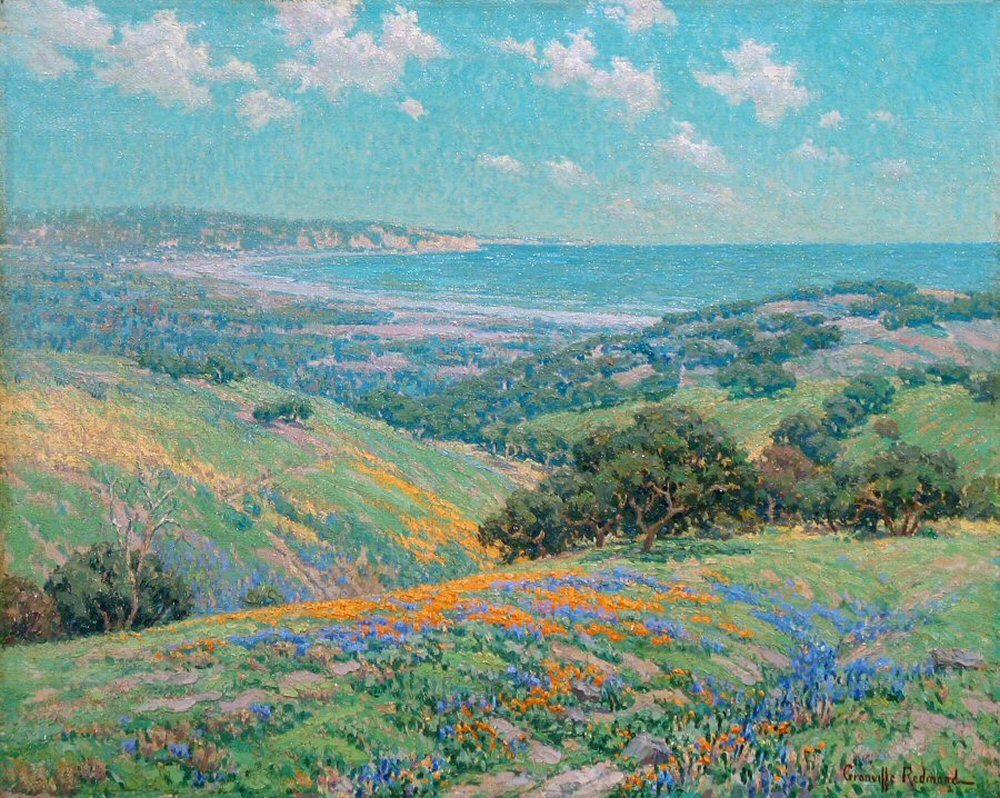
"Malibu Coast, Spring" by Granville Redmond, c. 1929

The area is within the Ventureño Chumash territory, which extended from the San Joaquin Valley to San Luis Obispo to Malibu, as well as several islands off the southern coast of California. The Chumash called the settlement Humaliwo or "the surf sounds loudly". The city's name derives from this, as the "Hu" syllable is not stressed.

Humaliwo was an important regional center in prehistoric times. The village, which is identified as CA-LAN-264, was occupied from approximately 2500 BCE. It was the second-largest Chumash coastal settlement by the Santa Monica Mountains, after Muwu (Point Mugu). This pre-colonial village was next to Malibu Lagoon and is now part of the State Park.

Humaliwo was considered an important political center, but there were additional minor settlements in the area. One village, Ta'lopop, was a few miles up Malibu Canyon from Malibu Lagoon. Research shows that Humaliwo had ties to other pre-colonial villages, including Hipuk (in Westlake Village), Lalimanux (by Conejo Grade) and Huwam (in Bell Canyon).

Conquistador Juan Rodríguez Cabrillo is believed to have moored at Malibu Lagoon, at the mouth of Malibu Creek, to obtain fresh water in 1542. The Spanish presence returned with the California mission system, and the area was part of Rancho Topanga Malibu Sequit—a 13,000-acre (53 km^{2}) land grant—in 1802. Baptismal records list 118 individuals from Humaliwo. That ranch passed intact to Frederick Hastings Rindge in 1891. He and his wife, Rhoda May Knight Rindge, staunchly protected their land. After his death, May guarded their property zealously by hiring guards to evict all trespassers and fighting a lengthy court battle to prevent the building of a Southern Pacific railroad line through the ranch. Interstate Commerce Commission regulations would not support a railroad condemning property in order to build tracks that paralleled an existing line, so Frederick Rindge built his own railroad through his property first. He died, and May followed through with the plans, building the Hueneme, Malibu and Port Los Angeles Railway. The line started at Carbon Canyon, just inside the ranch property's eastern boundary, and ran 15 miles westward, past Pt. Dume.

Few roads even entered the area before 1929, when the state won another court case and built what is now known as the Pacific Coast Highway. By then May Rindge was forced to divide her property and begin selling and leasing lots. The Rindge house, known as the Adamson House (a National Register of Historic Places site and California Historical Landmark), is now part of Malibu Creek State Park, between Malibu Lagoon State Beach and Surfrider Beach, beside the Malibu Pier that was used to provide transportation to/from the ranch, including construction materials for the Rindge railroad, and to tie up the family's yacht.

In 1926, in an effort to avoid selling land to stave off insolvency, May Rindge created a small ceramic tile factory. At its height, Malibu Potteries employed over 100 workers, and produced decorative tiles that furnish many Los Angeles-area public buildings and Beverly Hills residences. The factory, half a mile east of the pier, was ravaged by a fire in 1931. It partially reopened in 1932, but could not recover from the effects of the Great Depression and a steep downturn in Southern California construction projects. A distinct hybrid of Moorish and Arts and crafts designs, Malibu tile is considered highly collectible. Fine examples of the tiles may be seen at the Adamson House and Serra Retreat, a 50-room mansion that was started in the 1920s as the main Rindge home on a hill overlooking the lagoon. The unfinished building was sold to the Franciscan Order in 1942 and is operated as a retreat facility, Serra Retreat. It burned in the 1970 fire and was rebuilt using many of the original tiles.

Most of the Big Rock Drive area was bought in 1936 by William Randolph Hearst, who considered building an estate on the property. In 1944, he sold the lower half of his holdings there to Art Jones, one of Malibu's prominent early realtors, starting with the initial leases of Rindge land in Malibu Colony. He also owned or partly owned the Malibu Inn, Malibu Trading Post, and the Big Rock Beach Cafe (now Moonshadows restaurant). Philiip McAnany owned 80 acres (32 ha) in the upper Big Rock area, which he purchased in 1919, and had two cabins there, one of which burned in a brush fire that swept through the area in 1959, and the other in the 1993 Malibu fire. McAnany Way is named after him. On January 7, 2025, the city was struck by a massive 17,000 acres (6,900 ha) wildfire. With a lack of water, equipment and workers, the Los Angeles Fire Department was forced to start evacuating more than 30,000 citizens from the metropolitan area. Many homes were destroyed in Malibu, including most of the beach homes in the central part of the city. A few homes of well-known celebrities, including Paris Hilton's, were also affected by the fire.

=== Malibu Colony ===
Malibu Colony was one of the first areas with private homes after May Rindge opened Malibu to development in 1926. Frederick Rindge paid $10 an acre in 1890. One of Malibu's most famous districts, it is south of Malibu Road and the Pacific Coast Highway, west of Malibu Lagoon State Beach, east of Malibu Bluffs Park (formerly a state park), and across from the Malibu Civic Center. May Rindge allowed Hollywood movie stars to build vacation homes in the Colony as a defensive public relations wedge against the Southern Pacific from taking her property under eminent domain for a coastal train route. The action forced the Southern Pacific to route its northbound line inland then return to the coast in Ventura. But her long legal battle to protect the Malibu coast was costly, and she died penniless. Long a popular private enclave for wealthy celebrities, the Malibu Colony is a gated community with multi-million-dollar homes on small lots. It has views of the Pacific, with coastline views stretching from Santa Monica and Rancho Palos Verdes on the south (known locally as the Queen's Necklace) to the bluffs of Point Dume on the north.

=== High technology in Malibu ===
The first working model of a laser was demonstrated by Theodore Maiman in 1960 in Malibu at the Hughes Research Laboratory (now known as HRL Laboratories LLC). In the 1990s HRL Laboratories developed the FastScat computer code. TRW built a laboratory in Solstice Canyon without any structural steel to test magnetic detectors for satellites and medical devices.

=== Incorporation ===
In 1991, most of the Malibu land grant was incorporated as a city to allow local control of the area (as cities under California law, they are not subject to the same level of county government oversight). Prior to achieving municipal status, the local residents had fought several county-proposed developments, including an offshore freeway, a nuclear power plant, and several plans to replace septic tanks with sewer lines to protect the ocean from seepage that pollutes the marine environment. The incorporation drive gained impetus in 1986, when the Los Angeles County Board of Supervisors approved plans for a regional sewer that would have been large enough to serve 400,000 people in the western Santa Monica Mountains. Residents were incensed that they would be assessed taxes and fees to pay for the sewer project, and feared that the Pacific Coast Highway would need to be widened into a freeway to accommodate growth that they did not want. The supervisors fought the incorporation drive and prevented the residents from voting, a decision that was overturned in the courts.

The city councils in the 1990s were unable to write a Local Coastal Plan (LCP) that preserved enough public access to satisfy the California Coastal Commission, as required by the California Coastal Act. The state Legislature eventually passed a Malibu-specific law that allowed the Coastal Commission to write an LCP for Malibu, thus limiting the city's ability to control many aspects of land use. Because of the failure to adequately address sewage disposal problems in the heart of the city, the local water board ordered Malibu in November 2009 to build a sewage plant for the Civic Center area. The city council has objected to that solution. On February 2, 2007, Civic Center Stormwater Treatment Facility opened. On June 29, 2016, City of Malibu Civic Center Wastewater Treatment Facility, Phase 1, broke ground.

== Geography ==
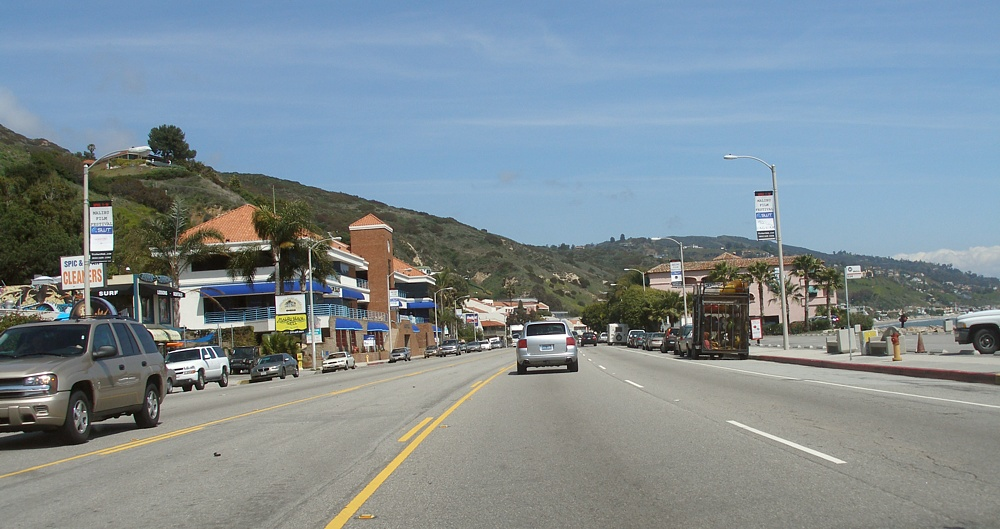
The Pacific Coast Highway (PCH) in central Malibu

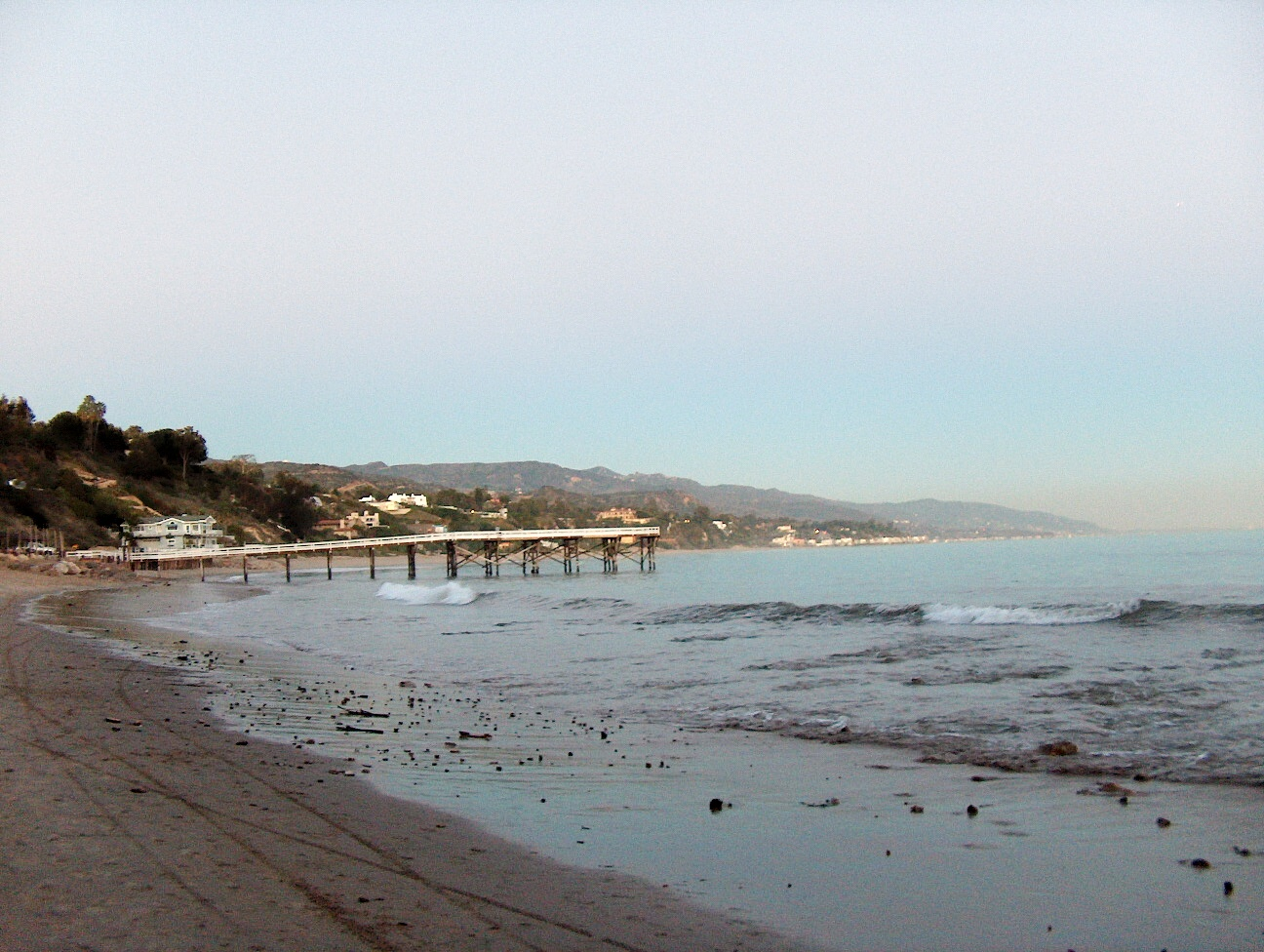
The Paradise Cove pier in Malibu

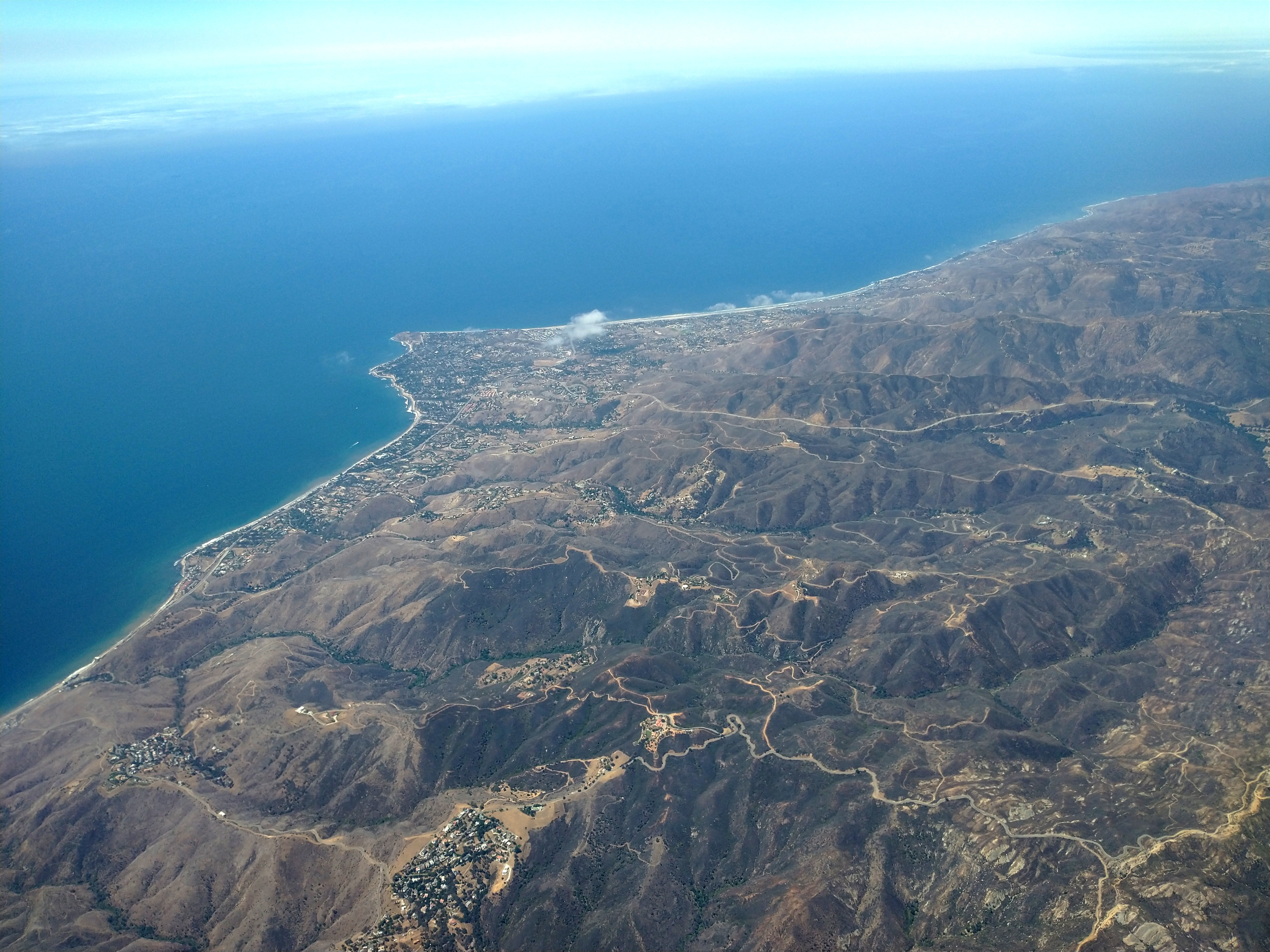
Residential developments in the mountains above Malibu coast

Malibu's eastern end borders the community of Topanga, which separates it from the city of Los Angeles. According to the United States Census Bureau, the city has an area of 19.8 square miles (51 km^{2}), over 99% of it is land.

Malibu's dry brush chaparral and steep clay slopes make it prone to fires, floods, and mudslides.

Beaches on the Malibu coast include Big Rock Beach, Broad Beach, County Line Beach, Dan Blocker Beach, La Costa Beach, Las Flores Beach, Malibu Beach, Point Dume Beach, Surfrider Beach, Topanga Beach, and Zuma Beach. State parks and beaches on the Malibu coast include Leo Carrillo State Beach and Park, Malibu Creek State Park, Point Mugu State Park, and Robert H. Meyer Memorial State Beach, along with individual beaches such as El Matador Beach, El Pescador Beach, La Piedra Beach, Carbon Beach, Surfrider Beach, Westward Beach, and Escondido Beach. Paradise Cove, Pirates Cove, Trancas, and Encinal Bluffs are along the coast in Malibu. Point Dume forms the northern end of the Santa Monica Bay, and Point Dume Headlands Park affords a vista stretching to the Palos Verdes Peninsula and Santa Catalina Island.

Like all California beaches, Malibu beaches are public below the mean high tide line. Many large public beaches are easily accessible, but such access is sometimes limited for some of the smaller and more remote beaches.

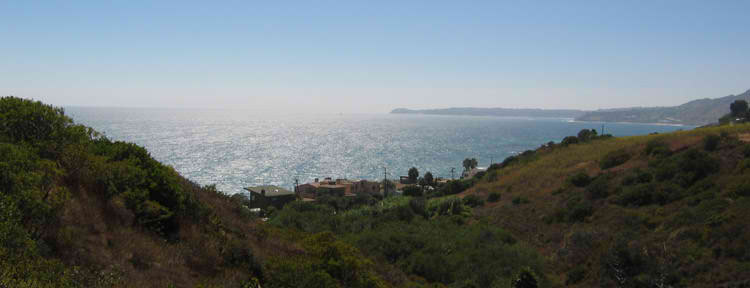
View from Malibu Bluffs Park, facing west toward Point Dume

The Malibu Coast lies on the fringe of an extensive chaparral and woodland wilderness area, the Santa Monica Mountains National Recreation Area. Various environmental elements collectively create a recipe for natural disasters: the mountainous and geologically unstable terrain; seasonal rainstorms that result in dense vegetation growth; seasonal dry Santa Ana winds; and a naturally dry topography and climate.

=== Wildfires ===
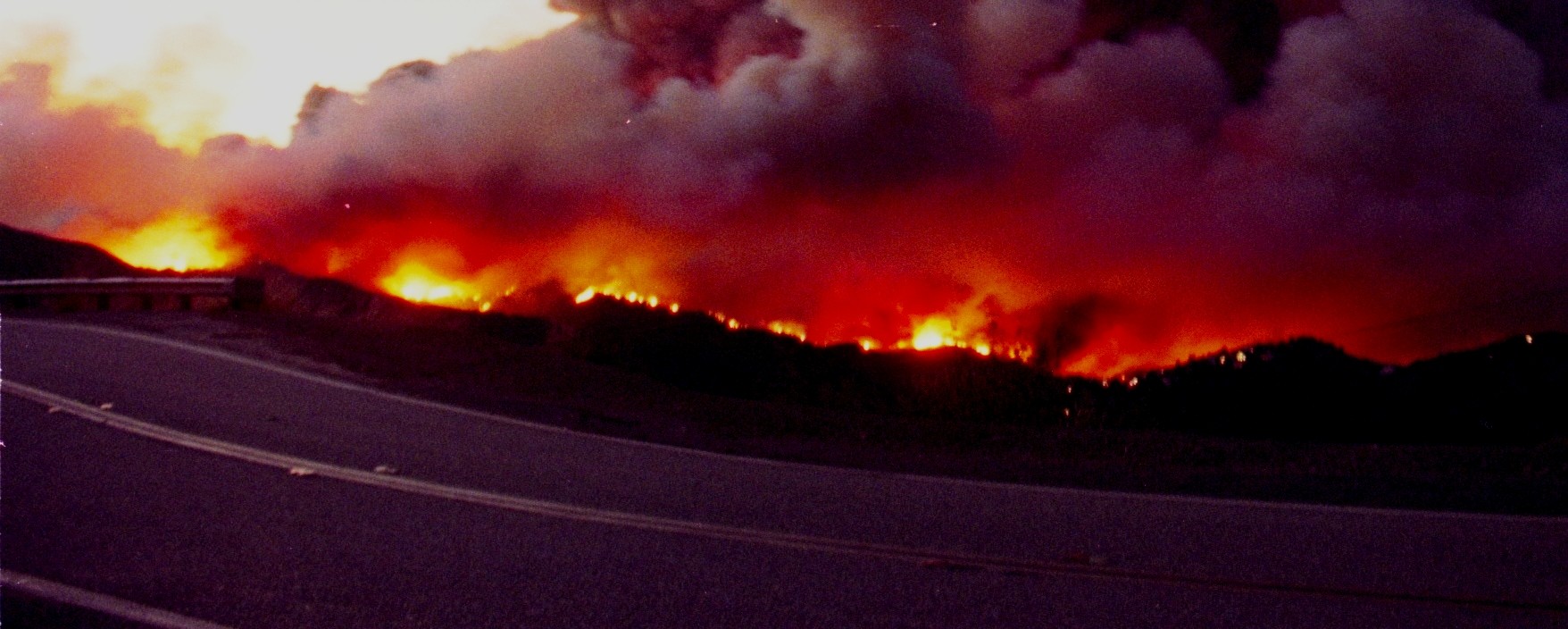
Looking down on the Corral Canyon brush fire from Latigo Canyon Road

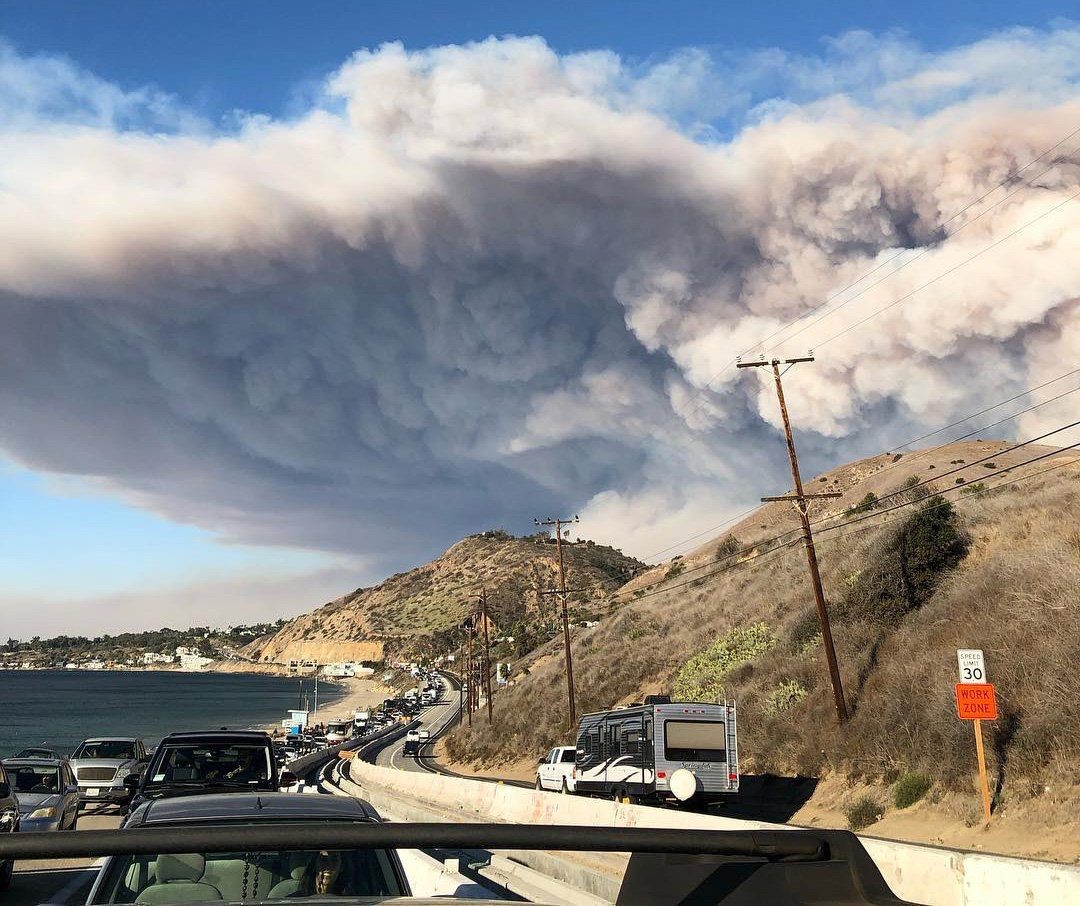
The smoke plume from the Woolsey Fire, seen from the Pacific Coast Highway

The Malibu coast has seen dozens of wildfires:

- October 26, 1929 – Malibu Colony, 13 homes burned.
- 1930 – "Potrero," Decker Canyon Road Corridor, 15,000 acres (61 km^{2}; 23 sq mi; 6,100 ha), accidental blaze caused by walnut pickers in Thousand Oaks area.
- October 23, 1935 – "Malibu" or "Latigo/Sherwood," Kanan/Decker Corridor, 30,000 acres (120 km^{2}; 47 sq mi; 12,000 ha).
- November 23, 1938 – "Topanga," Topanga Canyon, 14,500 acres (59 km^{2}; 5,900 ha; 22.7 sq mi).
- October 20, 1943 – "Las Flores," Malibu Canyon, 5,800 acres (23 km^{2}; 9.1 sq mi; 2,300 ha).
- November 6, 1943 – "Woodland Hills (Las Virgenes)," Kanan/Decker Corridor, 15,000 acres (6,100 ha; 23 sq mi; 61 km^{2}).
- December 26, 1956 – "Newton," Kanan/Decker Corridor, 26,000 acres (41 sq mi; 11,000 ha; 110 km^{2}), 100 homes, one death, Frank Dickover.
- December 2, 1958 – "Liberty," Malibu Canyon, 18,000 acres (73 km^{2}; 7,300 ha; 28 sq mi), eight firefighters injured, 74 homes destroyed (17 in Corral Canyon).
- November 6, 1961 – "Topanga," Topanga Canyon, 8,000 acres (32 km^{2}; 3,200 ha; 13 sq mi).
- September 25, 1970 – "Wright," Malibu Canyon, 28,000 acres (110 km^{2}; 44 sq mi; 11,000 ha), 10 deaths, 403 homes destroyed.
- October 30, 1973 – "Topanga," Topanga Canyon, 2,800 acres (11 km^{2}; 1,100 ha; 4.4 sq mi).
- October 23, 1978 – "Kanan," Kanan/Decker Corridor, 25,000 acres (100 km^{2}; 39 sq mi; 10,000 ha), 2 deaths, 230 homes.
- October 9, 1982 – "Dayton," Malibu Canyon Corridor, 44,000 acres (180 km^{2}; 69 sq mi; 18,000 ha), 15 homes in Paradise Cove destroyed.
- October 14, 1985 – "Piuma," Las Flores area, Topanga Canyon, 4,700 acres (19 km^{2}; 7.3 sq mi; 1,900 ha).
- October 14, 1985 – "Decker," Kanan/Decker Corridor, 6,600 acres (27 km^{2}; 2,700 ha; 10.3 sq mi). Both arson-caused; six homes destroyed; $1 million damage.
- November 2, 1993 – "Old Topanga/North Malibu." One of the largest fires in Malibu history, which burned 16,516 acres (25.806 sq mi; 66.84 km^{2}; 6,684 ha) from November 2 to 11. The 1993 firestorm was composed of two separate fires, one ravaging most of central Malibu/Old Topanga, and another, larger fire affecting areas north of Encinal Canyon. Three people died and 739 homes destroyed in the central Malibu/Old Topanga blaze. 18,949 acres (77 km^{2}; 30 sq mi; 7,668 ha) were torched in the north Malibu fire, with no deaths and few homes destroyed in the less densely populated region. Los Angeles County Fire Department officials announced suspicions that the fire was started by arson. The fire and widespread damage to properties and infrastructure resulted in the City of Malibu adopting the strictest fire codes in the country.
- October 21, 1996 – "Calabasas," Malibu Canyon Corridor, Brush fire ignited by arcing power line, 13,000 acres (53 km^{2}; 20 sq mi; 5,300 ha).
- January 6, 2003 – "Trancas", Trancas Canyon, 759 acres (1.186 sq mi; 307 ha; 3.07 km^{2}).
- January 8, 2007 – At about 5:00 pm a fire started in the vicinity of Bluffs Park, south of Pacific Coast Highway in Malibu. The fire hit near the Colony area, burning down four houses on Malibu Road, including the oceanfront home of Step By Step star Suzanne Somers. The Los Angeles County Fire Department announced that a discarded cigarette stub started the blaze.
- October 21, 2007 – At about 5:00 am a fire started off of Malibu Canyon Road. As of 1:00 pm there were 500+ personnel on scene. 1,200 acres (4.9 km^{2}; 1.9 sq mi; 490 ha) burned with no containment. 200+ homes were evacuated. Five homes were confirmed to have been destroyed, with at least nine others damaged. Two commercial structures were completely destroyed. Castle Kashan and the Malibu Presbyterian Church were both destroyed.
- November 24, 2007 – The "Corral Fire" destroyed 53 homes, damaged 35, and burned over 4,720 acres (19.1 km^{2}; 1,910 ha; 7.38 sq mi), forcing as many as 14,000 people to evacuate. Damages from the fire were expected to reach more than $100 million. The blaze originated at the top of Corral Canyon, where a group of young people who were in closed parkland after dusk had started a bonfire despite the presence of high Santa Ana winds. The individuals responsible for starting the fire were later identified, and are the subject of ongoing civil and criminal litigation.
- November 8, 2018 – The Woolsey Fire, a wildfire that burned from November 8–21 that burned 96,949 acres (392 km^{2}; 39,200 ha; 151 sq mi) and destroyed 1,500 structures and left 341 buildings damaged. The fire also resulted in 3 firefighter injuries and 3 civilian fatalities. In 2020, authorities blamed faulty Southern California Edison equipment for the blaze.
- December 9, 2024 – The Franklin Fire began shortly after 10:00 pm on December 9 near Malibu Canyon Road. The fire spread quickly under strong Santa Ana winds, burning a total of 4,037 acres (16.3 km^{2}; 6.31 sq mi; 1,630 ha) over the next few days. The fire prompted mandatory evacuations for much of Malibu and destroyed a total of 19 structures.
- January 7, 2025 – The January 2025 Southern California wildfires caused deaths, evacuations, and heavy damage to homes and property, including in Malibu. The Palisades Fire began around 10:30 a.m. on January 7 and initially burnt nearly 3,000 acres (12 km^{2}; 1,200 ha; 4.7 sq mi) between Santa Monica and Malibu. The uncontrollable blaze, which continued to consume buildings, has wound up burning more than 11,000 acres (17 sq mi; 45 km^{2}; 4,500 ha) between the two beach towns.

=== Mudslides ===
One of the most problematic side effects of the fires that periodically rage through Malibu is the destruction of vegetation, which normally provides some degree of topographical stability to the loosely packed shale and sandstone hills during periods of heavy precipitation. Rainstorms following large wildfires can thus cause mudslides, in which water-saturated earth and rock moves quickly down mountainsides, or entire slices of mountainside abruptly detach and fall downward.

After the 1993 wildfire stripped the surrounding mountains of their earth-hugging chaparral, torrential rainstorms in early 1994 caused a massive mudslide near Las Flores Canyon that closed down the Pacific Coast Highway for months. Thousands of tons of mud, rocks, and water rained down on the highway. The destruction to property and infrastructure was exacerbated by the road's narrowness at that point, with beachside houses abutting the highway with little or no frontage land as a buffer to the mudslide. Another large mudslide occurred on Malibu Canyon Road, between the Pepperdine University campus and HRL Laboratories LLC, closing down Malibu Canyon for two months. Yet another behemoth slide occurred on Kanan Dume Road, about one mile (1.6 km) up the canyon from the Pacific Coast Highway. This closure lasted many months, with Kanan finally fixed by the California Department of Transportation (Cal-Trans) over a year after the road collapsed.

Mudslides can occur at any time in Malibu, whether a recent fire or rainstorm has occurred or not. Pacific Coast Highway, Kanan Dume Road, and Malibu Canyon Road, as well as many other local roads, have been prone to many subsequent mudslide-related closures. During any period of prolonged or intense rain, Caltrans snowplows patrol most canyon roads in the area, clearing mud, rocks, and other debris from the roads. Such efforts keep most roads passable, but it is typical for one or more of the major roads leading into and out of Malibu to be temporarily closed during the rainy season.

=== Storms ===
Malibu is periodically subject to intense coastal storms. Occasionally, these unearth remnants of the Rindge railroad that was built through Malibu in the early 20th century.

On January 25, 2008, during an unusually large storm for Southern California, a tornado came ashore and struck a naval base's hangar, ripping off the roof. It was the first tornado to strike Malibu's shoreline in recorded history.

=== Earthquakes ===
Malibu is within 50 miles (80 km) of the San Andreas Fault, a fault over 800 miles (1,300 km) long that can produce an earthquake over magnitude 8. Several faults are in the region, making the area prone to earthquakes.

The 1971 Sylmar earthquake and the 1994 Northridge earthquake (magnitudes 6.6 and 6.7, respectively) shook the area. Smaller earthquakes happen more often.

=== Climate ===
This region experiences warm and dry summers, with no average monthly temperatures above 71.6 °F (22.0 °C). According to the Köppen Climate Classification system, Malibu has a warm-summer Mediterranean climate, abbreviated "Csb" on climate maps. The city's climate is influenced by the Pacific Ocean, resulting in far more moderate temperatures than locations further inland experience. Snow in Malibu is extremely rare, but flurries with higher accumulations in the nearby mountains occurred on January 17, 2007. More recently, snow fell in the city on January 25, 2021. The record high temperature of 104 °F (40 °C) was observed on September 27, 2010, while the record low temperature of 26 °F (−3 °C) was observed on January 14, 2007.

Climate data for Malibu, California (Point Mugu State Park, 1991–2020 normals)
Month	Jan	Feb	Mar	Apr	May	Jun	Jul	Aug	Sep	Oct	Nov	Dec	Year
Record high °F (°C)	88 (31)	91 (33)	94 (34)	100 (38)	98 (37)	102 (39)	101 (38)	98 (37)	104 (40)	103 (39)	98 (37)	96 (36)	104 (40)
Mean daily maximum °F (°C)	66.2 (19.0)	64.7 (18.2)	65.5 (18.6)	66.6 (19.2)	67.5 (19.7)	69.9 (21.1)	72.8 (22.7)	73.7 (23.2)	73.1 (22.8)	73.1 (22.8)	70.6 (21.4)	66.0 (18.9)	69.1 (20.6)
Mean daily minimum °F (°C)	45.6 (7.6)	45.8 (7.7)	47.7 (8.7)	48.3 (9.1)	51.8 (11.0)	55.5 (13.1)	58.4 (14.7)	58.3 (14.6)	57.0 (13.9)	54.2 (12.3)	48.1 (8.9)	44.0 (6.7)	51.2 (10.7)
Record low °F (°C)	26 (−3)	28 (−2)	31 (−1)	31 (−1)	34 (1)	37 (3)	42 (6)	43 (6)	40 (4)	35 (2)	28 (−2)	28 (−2)	26 (−3)
Average precipitation inches (mm)	2.36 (60)	3.93 (100)	2.17 (55)	0.48 (12)	0.38 (9.7)	0.11 (2.8)	0.02 (0.51)	0.01 (0.25)	0.08 (2.0)	0.40 (10)	0.88 (22)	1.71 (43)	12.53 (318)
Source 1: Averages: NOAA
Source 2: Records: MSN

== Demographics ==
Historical population
Census	Pop.	Note	%±
1980	2,438		—
1990	2,809		15.2%
2000	12,575		347.7%
2010	12,645		0.6%
2020	10,654		−15.7%
U.S. Decennial Census; 1860–1870 1880-1890; 1900 1910 1920; 1930 1940 1950; 1960 1970 1980; 1990 2000 2010; 2020; 1980 and 1990 as Point Dume CDP

The area that was to become Malibu city first appeared as a census-designated place under the name Point Dume in the 1980 United States census as part of the Calabasas census county division; and after incorporation appeared under its current name in the 2000 U.S. census.

=== Racial and ethnic composition ===
Malibu city, California – Racial and ethnic composition Note: the US Census treats Hispanic/Latino as an ethnic category. This table excludes Latinos from the racial categories and assigns them to a separate category. Hispanics/Latinos may be of any race.
Race / Ethnicity (NH = Non-Hispanic)	Pop 1990	Pop 2000	Pop 2010	Pop 2020	% 1990	% 2000	% 2010	% 2020
White alone (NH)	2,566	11,134	11,046	8,724	91.35%	88.54%	87.35%	81.88%
Black or African American alone (NH)	24	109	137	137	0.85%	0.87%	1.08%	1.29%
Native American or Alaska Native alone (NH)	10	20	17	12	0.36%	0.16%	0.13%	0.11%
Asian alone (NH)	69	310	323	339	2.46%	2.47%	2.55%	3.18%
Native Hawaiian or Pacific Islander alone (NH)	69	11	15	5	2.46%	0.09%	0.12%	0.05%
Other race alone (NH)	2	30	18	79	0.07%	0.24%	0.14%	0.74%
Mixed race or Multiracial (NH)	x	272	320	525	x	2.16%	2.53%	4.93%
Hispanic or Latino (any race)	128	689	769	833	4.56%	5.48%	6.08%	7.82%
Total	2,809	12,575	12,645	10,654	100.00%	100.00%	100.00%	100.00%

=== 2020 census ===
As of the 2020 census, Malibu had a population of 10,654 and a population density of 536.8 inhabitants per square mile (207.3/km^{2}). The median age was 52.2 years. The age distribution was 15.1% under the age of 18, 8.7% aged 18 to 24, 17.1% aged 25 to 44, 32.3% aged 45 to 64, and 26.7% who were 65 years of age or older. For every 100 females, there were 96.9 males, and for every 100 females age 18 and over there were 94.8 males.

The census reported that 99.3% of the population lived in households, 0.7% lived in non-institutionalized group quarters, and no one was institutionalized. 94.7% of residents lived in urban areas, while 5.3% lived in rural areas.

There were 6,624 housing units at an average density of 333.8 units per square mile (128.9 units/km^{2}), of which 4,558 (68.8%) were occupied and 31.2% were vacant. Of occupied units, 69.9% were owner-occupied and 30.1% were occupied by renters. The homeowner vacancy rate was 2.8% and the rental vacancy rate was 16.7%.

There were 4,558 households, of which 22.6% had children under the age of 18. Of all households, 45.9% were married-couple households, 5.4% were cohabiting couple households, 21.7% had a male householder with no spouse or partner present, and 27.0% had a female householder with no spouse or partner present. About 30.5% of households were one person, and 13.0% had someone aged 65 or older living alone. The average household size was 2.32. There were 2,847 families (62.5% of all households).

=== 2023 ACS estimates ===
In 2023, the US Census Bureau estimated that the median household income was $192,159, and the per capita income was $127,233. About 8.3% of families and 12.5% of the population were below the poverty line.

=== 2010 census ===
The 2010 United States census reported that Malibu had a population of 12,645. The population density was 637.7 inhabitants per square mile (246.2/km^{2}). The racial makeup of Malibu was 11,565 (91.5%) White (87.4% Non-Hispanic White), 148 (1.2%) African American, 20 (0.2%) Native American, 328 (2.6%) Asian, 15 (0.1%) Pacific Islander, 182 (1.4%) from other races, and 387 (3.1%) from two or more races. There were 769 people of Hispanic or Latino origin, of any race (6.1%).

The Census reported that 12,504 people (98.9% of the population) lived in households, 126 (1.0%) lived in non-institutionalized group quarters, and 15 (0.1%) were institutionalized.

There were 5,267 households, out of which 1,379 (26.2%) had children under the age of 18 living in them, 2,571 (48.8%) were opposite-sex married couples living together, 403 (7.7%) had a female householder with no husband present, 222 (4.2%) had a male householder with no wife present. There were 269 (5.1%) unmarried opposite-sex partnerships, and 49 (0.9%) same-sex married couples or partnerships. 1,498 households (28.4%) were made up of individuals, and 501 (9.5%) had someone living alone who was 65 years of age or older. The average household size was 2.37. There were 3,196 families (60.7% of all households); the average family size was 2.87.

There were 2,366 people (18.7%) under the age of 18, 1,060 people (8.4%) aged 18 to 24, 2,291 people (18.1%) aged 25 to 44, 4,606 people (36.4%) aged 45 to 64, and 2,322 people (18.4%) who were 65 years of age or older. The median age was 47.8 years. For every 100 females, there were 100.6 males. For every 100 females age 18 and over, there were 97.0 males.

There were 6,864 housing units at an average density of 346.2 units per square mile (133.7 units/km^{2}), of which 3,716 (70.6%) were owner-occupied, and 1,551 (29.4%) were occupied by renters. The homeowner vacancy rate was 2.8%; the rental vacancy rate was 11.9%. 9,141 people (72.3% of the population) lived in owner-occupied housing units and 3,363 people (26.6%) lived in rental housing units.

According to the 2010 United States Census, Malibu had a median household income of $133,869, with 10.6% of the population living below the federal poverty line.

=== Ancestry ===
Mapping L.A. reported that in 2000, German and English were the most common ancestries. Canada and the United Kingdom were the most common foreign places of birth.

== Economy ==
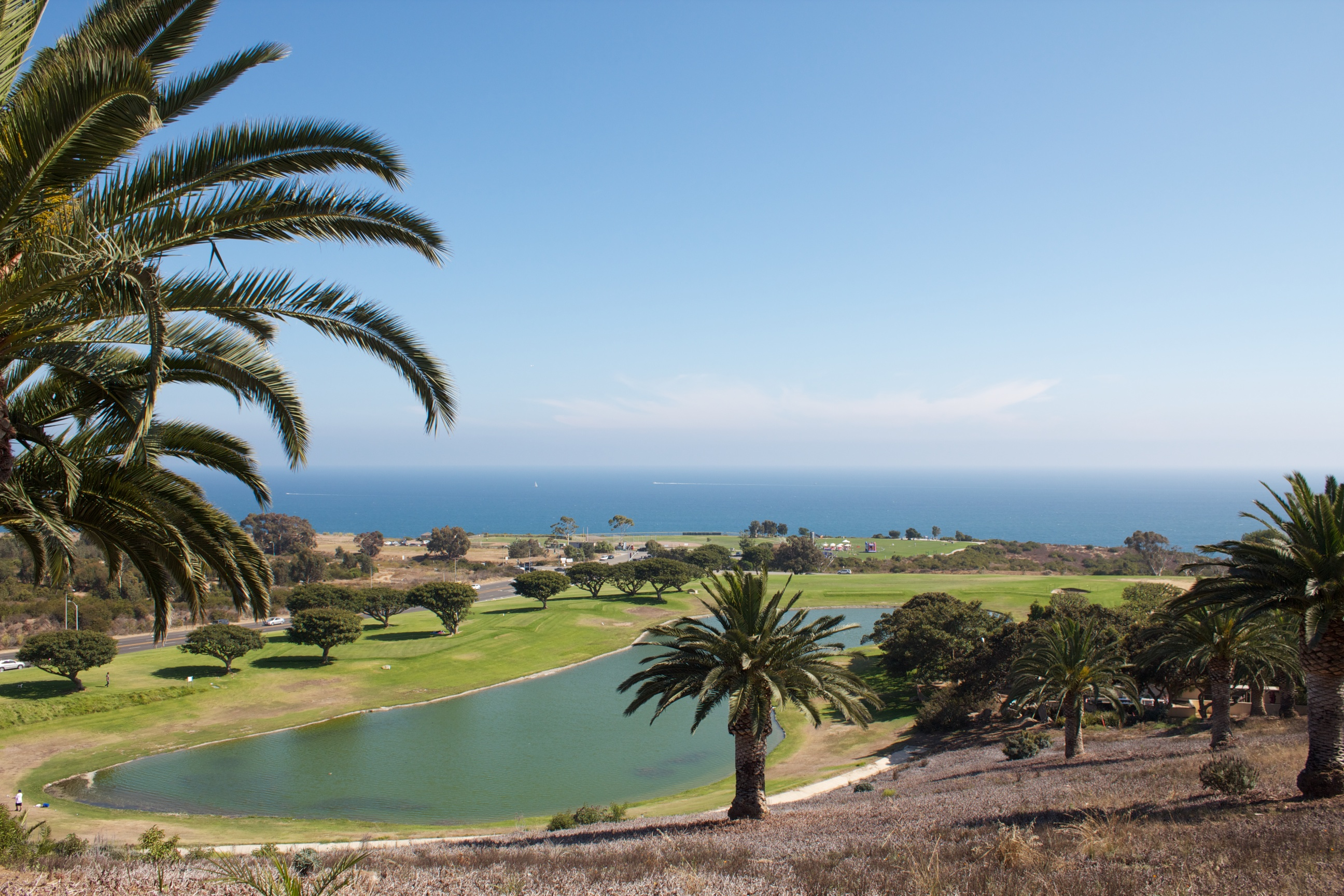
Pepperdine University campus, view to the coast

The Malibu Chamber of Commerce was formed in 1949 to provide support to local Malibu business, and has over 500 members.

Historically, there have been a number of firms across industries located in the city. HRL Laboratories, the research arm of the former Hughes Aircraft Company, it was sold to Boeing in 2000, was established in 1960 in Malibu. Among its research accomplishments was the first working laser. Despite the aerospace industry's downsizing in the 1990s, HRL is the largest employer in Malibu. Jakks Pacific, a toy company, is based in Malibu.

There are several shopping centers in the Malibu Civic Center area including the Malibu Country Mart. The Malibu Civic Center is known for being frequented by paparazzi and tourists looking to catch a glimpse of local celebrities.

=== Non-profit organizations ===
The Surfrider Foundation was formed in 1984 by a group of surfers gathered to protect 31 miles (50 km) of coastal waters from Marina Del Rey through Malibu to Ventura County, and represent the surfing community. Heal the Bay, a nonprofit organization for environmental advocacy, was formed in 1985 to protect Santa Monica Bay, which extends from Malibu's Point Dume along the entire coastline of Malibu past Santa Monica to the Palos Verdes Peninsula.

=== Institutions ===
Following the opening of Passages Malibu in 2001, the city has become home to numerous residential drug-abuse treatment centers. As of 2013, there are 35 state-licensed drug and alcohol rehabilitation facilities in Malibu, in addition to a multiplying number of unlicensed sober-living homes.

== Arts and culture ==
Getty Villa, an art museum that is part of the J. Paul Getty Museum, is just outside the city limits in the Pacific Palisades neighborhood of Los Angeles. It is owned and operated by the J. Paul Getty Trust, which also oversees the Getty Center in West Los Angeles. The Museum at the Getty Villa houses Getty's collections of antiquities, sculptures, art pieces and cultural artifacts of ancient Greece, Rome, and Etruria.

Adamson House, the historic house and gardens of the 19th-century original owners of Malibu, the Rindge Family, is a state museum. The Malibu Art Association, a nonprofit organization to foster the arts in Malibu, produces shows, demonstrations and workshops for its members, and offers art for public display throughout the community. The Malibu Garden Club holds an annual garden tour of private, residential gardens.

Malibu High School offers musicals every spring and instrumental and vocal musical concerts every winter and spring. Smothers Theatre of Pepperdine University's Theatrical Drama Department offers concerts, plays, musicals, opera, and dance.

=== Annual events ===
The Malibu Arts Festival is held annually on the last weekend in July by the Malibu Chamber of Commerce. The Malibu International Film Festival is held every year showcasing new films and filmmakers from around the world. The Malibu Chili Cookoff, held every Labor Day weekend, is sponsored by the Kiwanis Club of Malibu. Proceeds benefit children and youth organizations. The Malibu Nautica Triathlon is held every September. In 2007, it raised $718,000 to benefit Children's Hospital Los Angeles.

The Polar Plunge (Los Angeles) is held each year in February at Zuma Beach to help raise funds for the Special Olympics in Southern California.

== Parks and recreation ==
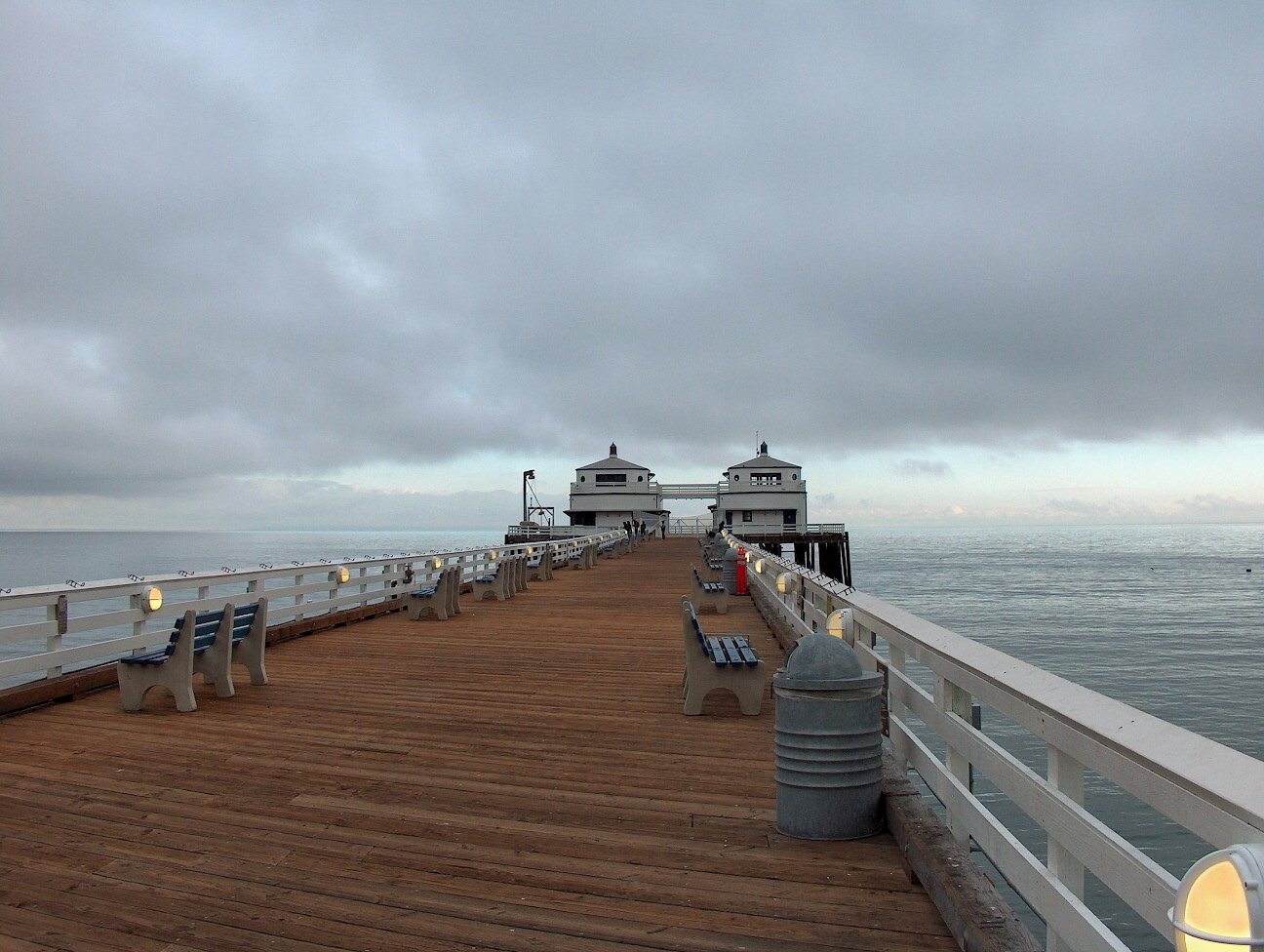
The Malibu pier near Surfrider Beach

California State Parkland in the hills behind Malibu provides extensive horseback-riding, hiking, running, and mountain-biking options, affording many different views of the Santa Monica Mountains, the curve of the Santa Monica Bay, Santa Catalina Island, and the San Fernando Valley. There are many points of access to the Backbone Trail System throughout the local canyons, as well as a variety of smaller, local trailheads.

Pacific Coast Highway is popular with road cycling enthusiasts for its vistas. The route also has a reputation for being quite dangerous for cyclists, which inspired the creation of the Dolphin Run, an annual community event commemorating local victims of reckless driving. The Dolphin Run was held each Autumn from 1990 to 2004.

In late June 2008, the Malibu Pier reopened after $10 million in renovations.

=== Malibu Bluffs Community Park and Malibu Bluffs Recreation Area ===
The former Malibu Bluffs State Park ownership changed hands in 2006 after the California Department of Parks and Recreation transferred the park's 93 acres (38 ha) control to the Santa Monica Mountains Conservancy, They established the Malibu Bluffs Recreation Area, an Open Space Preserve of 90 acres (36 ha) on the bluffs between the Pacific Coast Highway and Malibu Road, directly opposite Pepperdine University and Malibu Canyon Road. The 100-foot (30 m) bluffs rise above Amarillo Beach and Puerco Beach across Malibu Road. Five public stairways (which adjoin private property) lead down to the shoreline from the base of the bluffs. The trails begin from the spacious lawns in Malibu Bluffs Community Park.

The Malibu Bluffs Recreation Area surrounds the 6-acre (2.4 ha) Malibu Bluffs Community Park, whose 10-acre (4.0 ha) parcel the Santa Monica Mountains Conservancy sold to the city. It consists of the Michael Landon Community Center, baseball diamonds, and soccer fields. Home of the Malibu Little League (MLL), Malibu AYSO, are youth soccer organizations that share practice fields. For over 20 years, the State Parks planned to return the land to its native wetlands and vegetation. A rider to a California state law was written specifically in the 1950s to allow baseball, with its attendant field accoutrements, to continue being played in the state park. Other city parks include Las Flores Creek Park, Malibu Bluffs Park, and Trancas Canyon Park.

=== Malibu Legacy Park Project ===
Malibu Legacy Park is a restoration project undertaken by the city with broad community support. A vacant, 20-acre (8.1 ha) plot of land owned by Jerry Perenchio was sold to the City of Malibu in 2005 with strict deed restrictions prohibiting any further commercial use. It had agricultural land with geraniums, other flowers and vegetables planted by the Takahashi family since 1924. The state-of-the-art water treatment plant takes stormwater runoff that accumulates in the park to mitigate the stormwater pollution in Malibu Creek, Malibu Lagoon, and Surfrider Beach. The Malibu Legacy Park Project responds to critical issues, including bacteria reduction by stormwater treatment; nutrient reduction in wastewater management; restoration and development of riparian habitats; and the development of an open space area for passive recreation and environmental education. In addition, the project will be linked by a "linear park" to neighboring Surfrider Beach, Malibu Pier, Malibu Lagoon, and Malibu Bluffs Park.

Ball sports are prohibited in the park along with running/jogging and other sports. The park includes many educational features, an outdoor classroom, and other informative features which explain the different habitats.

=== Surfrider Beach ===
On October 9, 2010, Surfrider Beach was dedicated as the first World Surfing Reserve.

Across the street from the civic center of Malibu, Surfrider Beach is adjacent to the Malibu Colony and Malibu Pier. This surfing beach was featured in 1960s surf movies like Beach Party. The Surfrider point break stems from the Malibu Colony into Santa Monica Bay and carries the nickname "Third Point". Surfing at this spot is popular during the winter.

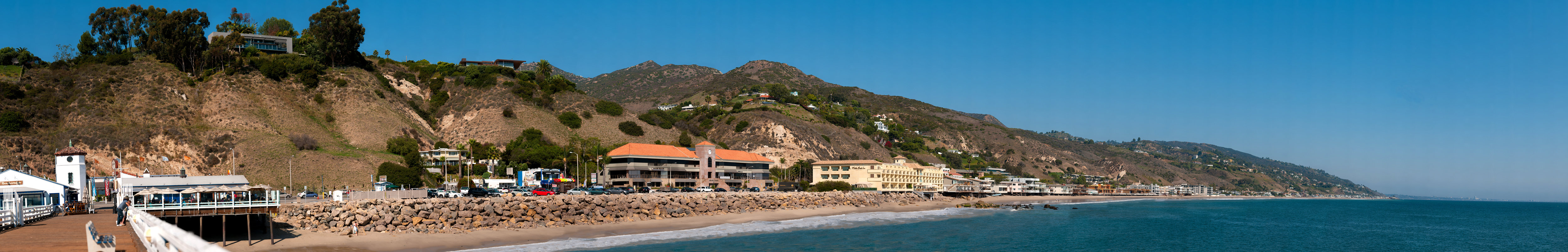
A view of Malibu Beach

== Government ==
=== Municipal government ===
Malibu is a general law city governed with a five-member City Council including the mayor and mayor pro tem. The City Council hires a city manager to carry out policies and serve as executive officer. Every even-numbered year either two or three members are elected by the people to serve a four-year term. Usually, the City Council meets in April and chooses one of its members as mayor and one as mayor-pro-tem. In 2006, this pattern was deviated from when the council decided to have a cycle of three mayors and mayors pro-tem in the coming two years. Malibu does not have a police force. The Los Angeles County Sheriff's Department provides law enforcement services to Malibu.

=== County, state, and federal representation ===
In the state legislature, Malibu is in the 24th senatorial district, represented by Democrat Ben Allen, but prior to redistricting was in the 27th senatorial district, represented by Democrat Henry Stern. It is in the 42nd Assembly district, represented by Democrat Jacqui Irwin.

In the United States House of Representatives, Malibu is in California's 32nd congressional district, which is represented by Brad Sherman.

== Education ==
=== Schools ===
The Santa Monica-Malibu Unified School District serves Malibu with two elementary schools: John L. Webster Elementary School (grades K-5, in central Malibu) and Malibu Elementary School (grades K-5, in northwestern Malibu's Pt. Dume district). Malibu High School (MHS) provides secondary public education for both middle school (grades 6–8) and high school (grades 9–12). MHS is in northwestern Malibu. Private schools include Calmont, Our Lady of Malibu (Catholic), Colin McEwen High School, New Roads, and St. Aidan's School.

=== Higher Education ===
Established in 1937 in south-central Los Angeles, Pepperdine University moved to its Malibu campus in 1972. But when Malibu incorporated as a city, the boundaries were drawn to exclude Pepperdine, at the college's insistence. The university is a private college affiliated with the Church of Christ, located today in central Malibu, north of the Malibu Colony at the intersection of the Pacific Coast Highway and Malibu Canyon Road. Malibu is also served by Santa Monica College, a community college in the nearby city of Santa Monica to the south.

=== Library ===
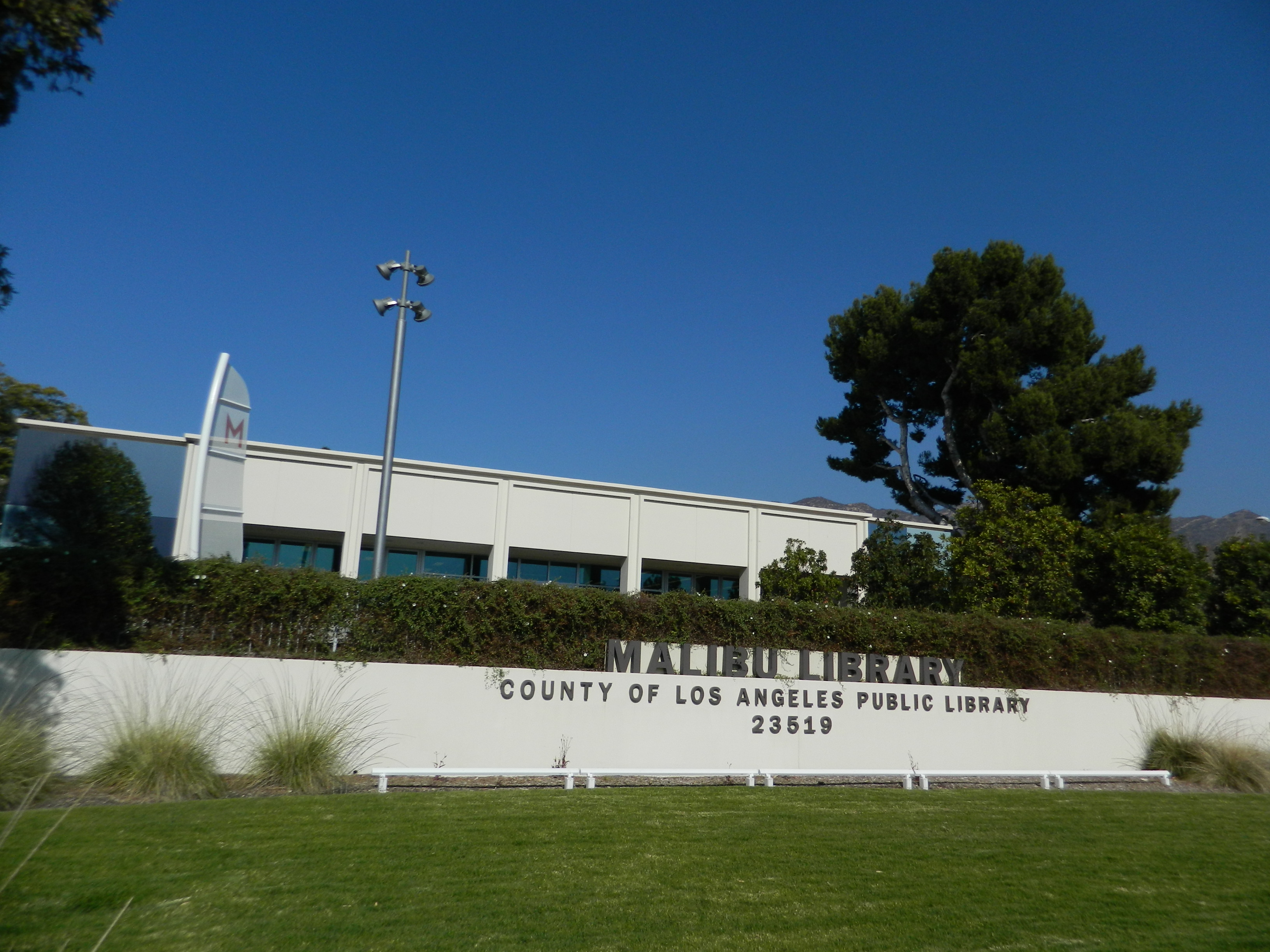
Exterior of the Malibu branch of the LA County Library

Malibu Public Library, a 16,530-square-foot (1,536 m^{2}) branch of the County of Los Angeles Public Library, is in the Malibu Civic Center Complex. The branch has an adult reading area, a children's reading area, a 125-person meeting room, and free parking. The library opened in 1970. Before that, residents were served by a bookmobile.

== Media ==
Pepperdine University's TV-32 is fed on Educational-access television cable TV channel 32, and was previously on channel 26. Broadcast radio stations licensed for Malibu include FM booster station KPFK-FM1 for 90.7 KPFK Los Angeles. 92.7 KYRA, Thousand Oaks, had a booster KYRA-FM1 with a city of license of "Malibu Vista".

Malibu has three local newspapers: The Malibu Times, founded in 1946, the Malibu Surfside News, and Pepperdine University's student newspaper, the Graphic. There are also three magazines in Malibu: Malibu Arts Journal, Malibu Magazine, and Malibu Times Magazine and "Malibu Biz".

== Infrastructure ==
=== Public services ===
Fire protection is served by the Los Angeles County Fire Department. The Los Angeles County Sheriff's Department (LASD) operates the Malibu/Lost Hills Station in Calabasas, serving Malibu under contract with the city. The Los Angeles County Department of Health Services SPA 5 West Area Health Office serves Malibu. The department operates the Simms/Mann Health and Wellness Center in Santa Monica, serving Malibu. Water is provided by LA Waterworks District 29.

The U.S. Postal Service operates the Malibu Post Office at 23838 Pacific Coast Highway, the Colony Annex at 23648 Pacific Coast Highway, adjacent to the Malibu Post Office, and the La Costa Malibu Post Office at 21229 Pacific Coast Highway.

=== Transportation ===
The Pacific Coast Highway (SR 1) is the central route through the length of the city. PCH handles approximately 40,500 vehicles per day during peak hours in the summer. The LA Metro bus line 134 runs along PCH from Trancas market to Santa Monica. PCH currently operates at a reduced capacity due to the Palisades Fire with the speed limit set to 25 mph.

== In popular culture ==
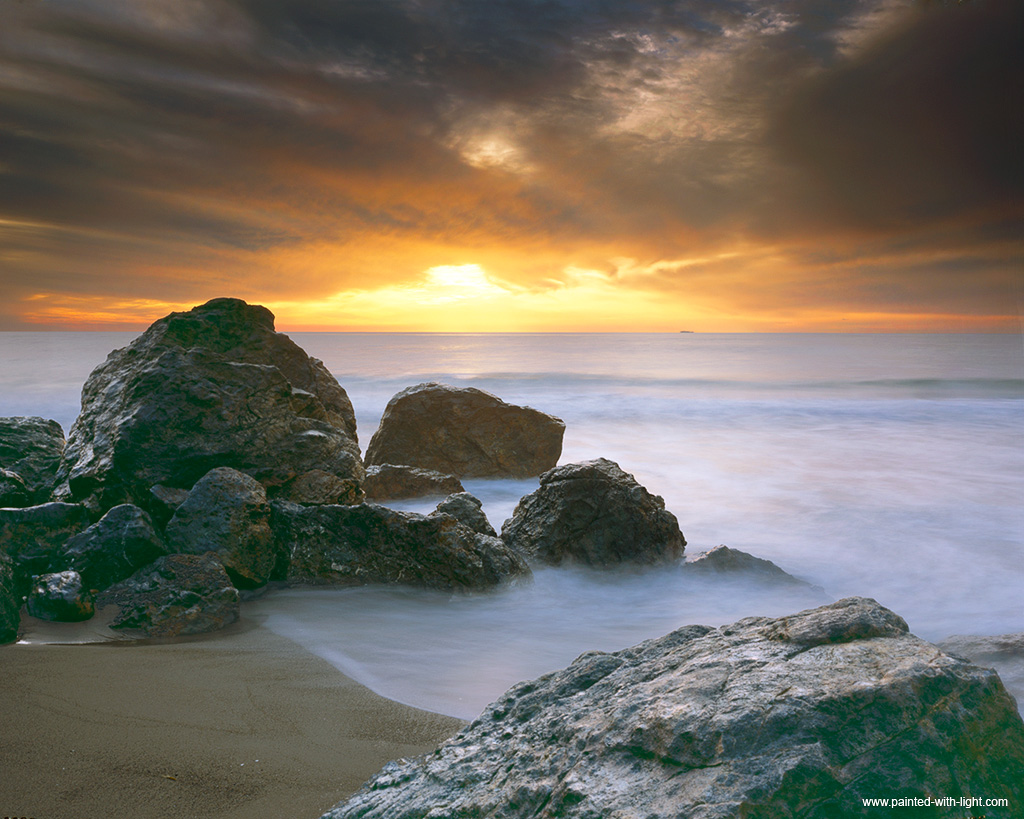
Point Dume, a frequently used film location

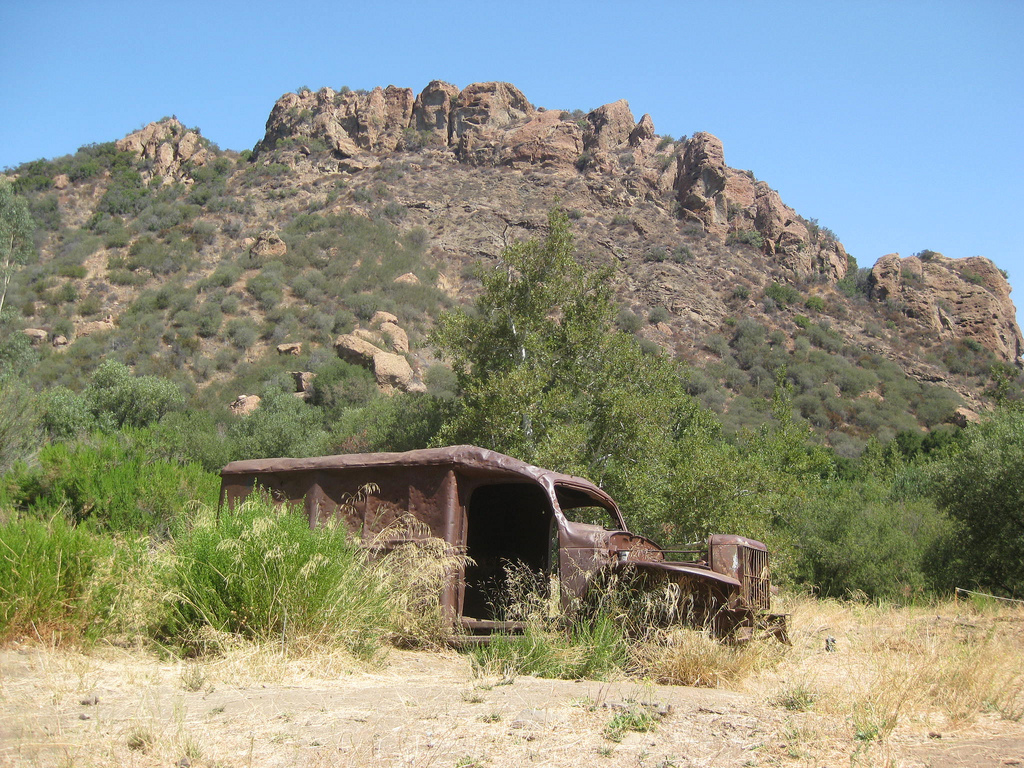
Ambulance hulk at M*A*S*H filming site, Malibu Creek State Park, 2008

Malibu has been used as a location or setting for many films, television programs, fashion shoots and music videos.

Surfrider Beach was home to Gidget, and surfing movies of the 1960s. Jill Munroe and her sister Kris Munroe's Charlie's Angels beach house was in Malibu. The residence can also be seen in the first scene after the opening theme song of Beach Blanket Bingo. Important scenes in the Planet of the Apes series were filmed at Point Dume. The hero's trailer in The Rockford Files was parked by the Paradise Cove Pier. Love American Style and The Mod Squad are among many TV series and commercials filmed in Paradise Cove. A 1978 film starring Suzanne Somers was titled Zuma Beach. In the 1990s and 2000s, it was the setting for MTV Beach House, Malibu's Most Wanted, and Nickelodeon's Zoey 101. Point Dume is the location of Tony Stark's mansion in the Marvel Cinematic Universe, first appearing in Iron Man.

Malibu is the setting for the TV series Two and a Half Men. The TV series So Little Time (2001) portrayed two Malibu teens (Mary-Kate and Ashley Olsen) who attend the fictional West Malibu High. Fictional teen star Hannah Montana / Miley Stewart (portrayed by Miley Cyrus) and her father Robby Ray Stewart (portrayed by Billy Ray Cyrus) live in Malibu on the Disney Channel Original Series Hannah Montana. In the Fox TV series The O.C., both the Cohen house and the Cooper home were actually in Malibu. Malibu Shores, a teen drama that aired on NBC, was set in Malibu. Some scenes from The Even Stevens Movie were filmed on Westward Beach in Point Dume. The small hit TV show Summerland was also filmed and set in Malibu. The TV series "Good Trouble," a spinoff of "The Fosters," and the latest season of the anthology series "American Horror Story," titled "Delicate," also featuring scenes shot in Malibu.

In 2006, Bravo television aired Million Dollar Listing, a real-estate related show based on million-dollar listings in Malibu, as well as Hollywood, including real-life Malibu agents such as Chris Cortazzo, Scotty Brown, Madison Hildebrand, and Lydia Simon.

The MTV reality show Buzzin' starring Shwayze and Cisco Adler is mostly filmed in Malibu, at locations including Westward Beach, Malibu Courthouse, Pacific Coast Highway, Point Dume Trailer Park, Malibu Inn, and the outside of PC Greens.

Gulls Way Estate, Malibu is the setting for the TV series Hardcastle and McCormick.

There are also many music videos filmed on Malibu's beaches. In 1998, the alternative rock band Hole shot the video for the song "Malibu" at the Matador Beach. Mariah Carey's video for her 2009 single H.A.T.E.U. was filmed there. American singer Nick Lachey's video for his 2006 single "I Can't Hate You Anymore" from the What's Left Of Me album, was filmed at the place on June 27, 2006, before Lachey's divorce from the American singer-actress Jessica Simpson became final three days later after its release. Selena Gomez's "Love You Like a Love Song" video was partly filmed in Malibu. Music videos for "Survivor" by Destiny's Child, "If It's Lovin' That You Want" by Rihanna, "Sunshine" by Lil Flip, "Natural" by S Club 7, "Feel It Boy" by Beenie Man featuring Janet Jackson, "You're Still the One" by Shania Twain, and many others were filmed on Westward Beach. Linda Ronstadt, who lived in the Colony, is photographed in front of her home for her 1976 Grammy award-winning album Hasten Down the Wind. Girls Aloud filmed their video "Call the Shots" on the beach at Malibu. In 1999, Britney Spears shot the video for the song "Sometimes" directed by Nigel Dick on the pier at Paradise Cove. Also in late 1998, Madonna shot her video for "The Power of Good-Bye" near Silver Top mansion. The music videos for "Lost" by American band Maroon 5 and "Somebody to You", from British band The Vamps featuring Demi Lovato were both filmed on Malibu Beach. One Direction's video "What Makes You Beautiful" on July 11, 2011, and Watermelon Sugar filmed on January 30, 2020, by Harry Styles.

In 2020, during the COVID-19 pandemic, a paddleboarder was arrested for paddleboarding in violation of Gavin Newsom's stay-at-home order. This incident received significant media attention, with one individual spray painting "Surfing is not a crime" on Surfrider wall.

== Sister cities ==
- Lijiang, Yunnan, China

== See also ==
- Chevrolet Malibu, named after the coastal community
- Hueneme, Malibu and Port Los Angeles Railway (The railroad that the Rindges built through Malibu)
- Malibu Locals Only
- MV Malibu, a yacht commissioned by May Rindge in 1926
- Rindge Co. v. County of Los Angeles
- Streisand effect
