= Cornell, Los Angeles County, California =

Unincorporated community in California, United States

Cornell, California
- Unincorporated community
- Location in California
- Coordinates: 34°06′52″N 118°46′40″W
- Country: United States
- State: California
- County: Los Angeles
- Elevation: 790 ft (240 m)

Cornell is an unincorporated community in the Santa Monica Mountains, within western Los Angeles County, California, United States. It is located 5 miles (8.0 km) west of Agoura Hills and approximately 2.5 miles (4.0 km) north of Malibu. Cornell's heyday was the 1910s to the 1950s, and the settlement is now essentially a ghost town but a handful of buildings and one functioning restaurant persisted circa 2007.

== Geography ==
Cornell is a neighbourhood of homes along the Mulholland Highway Corridor and in the rural mountain area near Malibou Lake. It is largely surrounded by open space parks within the NPS Santa Monica Mountains National Recreation Area, including Paramount Ranch and Peter Strauss Ranch parks. The former Paramount Studios property was a movie ranch, still with 'Old Western' sets used in filming movies and television series. Cornell is notable for its "tall trees" atmosphere among old-growth oak and pine, and for the many peacocks that roam the neighborhoods, and perch on residents' rooftops and balconies. Many homes have acreage and stables with horses, with numerous horse and hiking trails in the surrounding parklands.

Cornell is located between Agoura Hills and Malibu. It can be reached most easily via Kanan Road/Kanan Dume Road, from either Pacific Coast Highway southwest in Malibu, or the Ventura Freeway (101) northeast in Agoura Hills.

Cable TV and refuse pickup are served from Malibu; while their water and electricity are served from Agoura Hills. The town uses the Agoura Hills ZIP Code 91301.

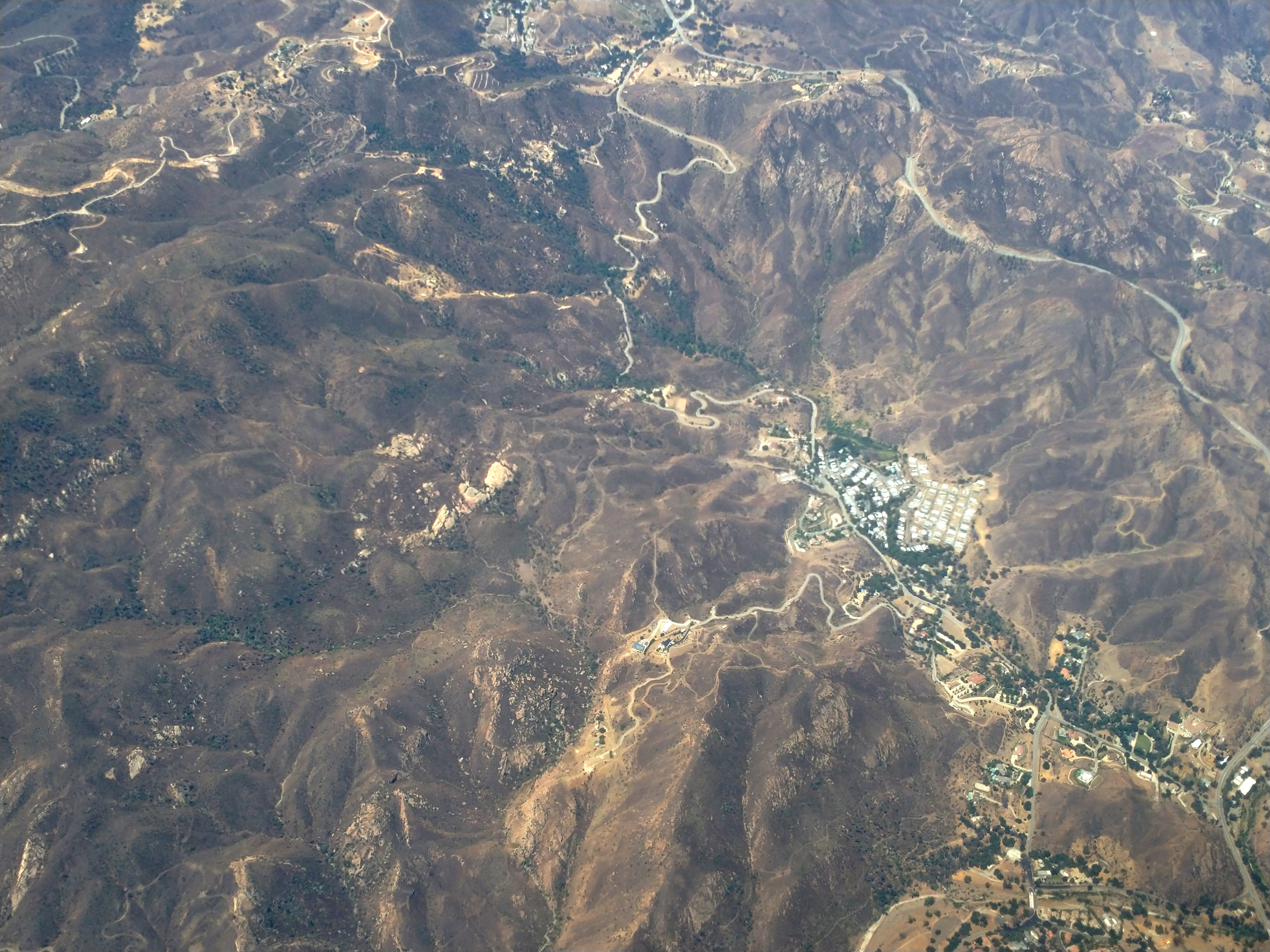
Seminole Springs mobilehome park at the edge of town

== History ==
A resort nearby was called Lake Enchanto, and the name was sometimes applied to Cornell. A branch of the Los Angeles County Free Library was opened in 1915 "Located in the Post-office and General Store, the stock of books now numbers 356." As of 1927, there were 41 registered borrowers in Cornell.

== Features ==
A post office operated at Cornell from 1884 to 1904. The former post office was later turned into The Old Place Restaurant and was frequented by Steve McQueen, Ali MacGraw and Jason Robards in the late 1960s.

The Tour of California bicycle race passes through Cornell on Mulholland Highway.

== See also ==
- Populated places in the Santa Monica Mountains
- Natural history of the Santa Monica Mountains
- Seminole Hot Springs, California
