= Las Virgenes Road/Malibu Canyon Road =

Road in Los Angeles County, California

Las Virgenes Road / Malibu Canyon Road
- The road from the Valley to the Sea
- Part of: CR N1 from SR 1 in Malibu to US 101 in Calabasas
- Namesake: Rancho Las Vírgenes; Rancho Topanga Malibu Sequit
- Maintained by: Local city jurisdictions; Los Angeles County Department of Public Works
- Length: 11 mi (18 km)
- South end: SR 1 in Malibu
- Major junctions: US 101 in Calabasas
- North end: Los Virgenes Canyon Trail in the Upper Las Virgenes Canyon Open Space Preserve

Other
| ← CR J132 | CR N1 | → CR N2 |

Las Virgenes Road / Malibu Canyon Road is a north–south road that runs for 11 miles (18 km) and traverses the Santa Monica Mountains in Los Angeles County, connecting California State Route 1 in Malibu with U.S. Route 101, the San Fernando Valley, and the Upper Las Virgenes Canyon Open Space Preserve. The southernmost 8.5-mile (13.7 km) portion of the road between Route 1 and Route 101 is designated County Route N1 and nicknamed "the road from the Valley to the Sea."

== Name ==
Las Virgenes Road is the truncated version of El Rancho de Nuestra la Reina de Las Virgenes (transl. the ranch of our Lady of the Virgins), also known as Rancho Las Vírgenes. Malibu Canyon Road was named after Rancho Topanga Malibu Sequit, in which Malibu, a poor Anglicisation of Humaliwo (transl. place of the wild surf), was the name of a local Tongva or Chumash village.

== Route description ==
From the south, Malibu Canyon Road begins at SR 1 in Malibu. It then heads north into the Santa Monica Mountains alongside Malibu Creek until it reaches Piuma Road, where Malibu Canyon Road becomes Las Virgenes Road. After entering the city of limits of Calabasas, Las Virgenes Road crosses Mulholland Highway then continues to US 101 (Ventura Freeway). The road then continues north to the entrance to the Upper Las Virgenes Canyon Open Space Preserve, where it then turns into a dirt bike trail that extends for an additional 0.3 miles (0.48 km) to the Los Virgenes Canyon Trail.

The 8.5 miles (13.7 km) of Malibu Canyon and Las Virgenes Road between SR 1 and US 101 is officially designated as County Route N1 (although Google Maps and other commercially produced maps sometimes show the county route continuing north along Las Virgenes Road from US 101 to the Los Virgenes Canyon Trail).

The segment from SR 1 to Lost Hills Road in Calabasas has been designated by the California Department of Transportation as part of the State Scenic Highway System.

== History ==
County Road N1
- Location: Malibu–Calabasas
- Length: 8.5 mi (13.7 km)
- Existed: 1963–present
- Tourist routes: State Scenic Highway (between SR 1 and Lost Hills Road)

Malibu Canyon Road was constructed in 1951. One year later, the road was extended to Las Virgenes Road, which at the time terminated at the crest of the Santa Monica Mountains. Once connected, the combination of these roads was nicknamed "the road from the Valley to the Sea."

The portion of this road between Route 1 and Route 101 was designated County Route N1 in 1963. This road was also considered for the north–south alignment of the never built California State Route 64, which was proposed in 1963 based on a previous proposal from 1959. Plans for the Malibu portion of Route 64, which would have been named the Malibu Canyon Freeway, were abandoned in 1970 and the rest of the route was abandoned in 1975.

== Notable landmarks ==
Notable landmarks on Las Virgenes and Malibu Canyon Road include (from south to north): Malibu Bluffs Park, Pepperdine University, Backbone Trail, Tapia Park and Water Reclamation Facility, Malibu Hindu Temple, and Malibu Creek State Park.

== Major intersections ==
| Location | mi | km | Destinations | Notes |
|---|---|---|---|---|
| Malibu | 0.0 | 0.0 | SR 1 (Pacific Coast Highway) – Oxnard, Santa Monica; CR N1 begins | Southern terminus of CR N1 and Malibu Canyon Road |
| Liberty Canyon | 4.6 | 7.4 | Piuma Road | Northern terminus of Malibu Canyon Road; southern terminus of Las Virgenes Road |
| Calabasas | 6.3 | 10.1 | Mulholland Highway | |
| Calabasas | 7.9 | 12.7 | Lost Hills Road | |
| Calabasas | 9.2 | 14.8 | Agoura Road | |
| Calabasas | 9.6 | 15.4 | CR N1 ends US 101 (Ventura Freeway) – Ventura, Pasadena, Los Angeles | US 101 exit 32; northern terminus of CR N1 |
| Calabasas | 9.6 | 15.4 | Mureau Road | |
| Calabasas | 10.5 | 16.9 | Thousand Oaks Boulevard | |
| Calabasas | 11.0 | 17.7 | Northern end of automobile use; southern end of biking trail | |
| Upper Las Virgenes Canyon Open Space Preserve | 11.4 | 18.3 | Las Virgenes Canyon Trail | Northern terminus of Las Virgenes Road |
1.000 mi = 1.609 km; 1.000 km = 0.621 mi: Route transition
