= Peter Strauss (disambiguation) =

Peter Strauss (born 1947) is an American television and movie actor.

Peter Strauss may also refer to:

- Peter L. Strauss (born 1940), Columbia Law School professor
- Peter Strauss Ranch, Santa Monica mountains

== See also ==
- R. Peter Straus (1923–2012), American media proprietor
