= Malibu Hindu Temple =

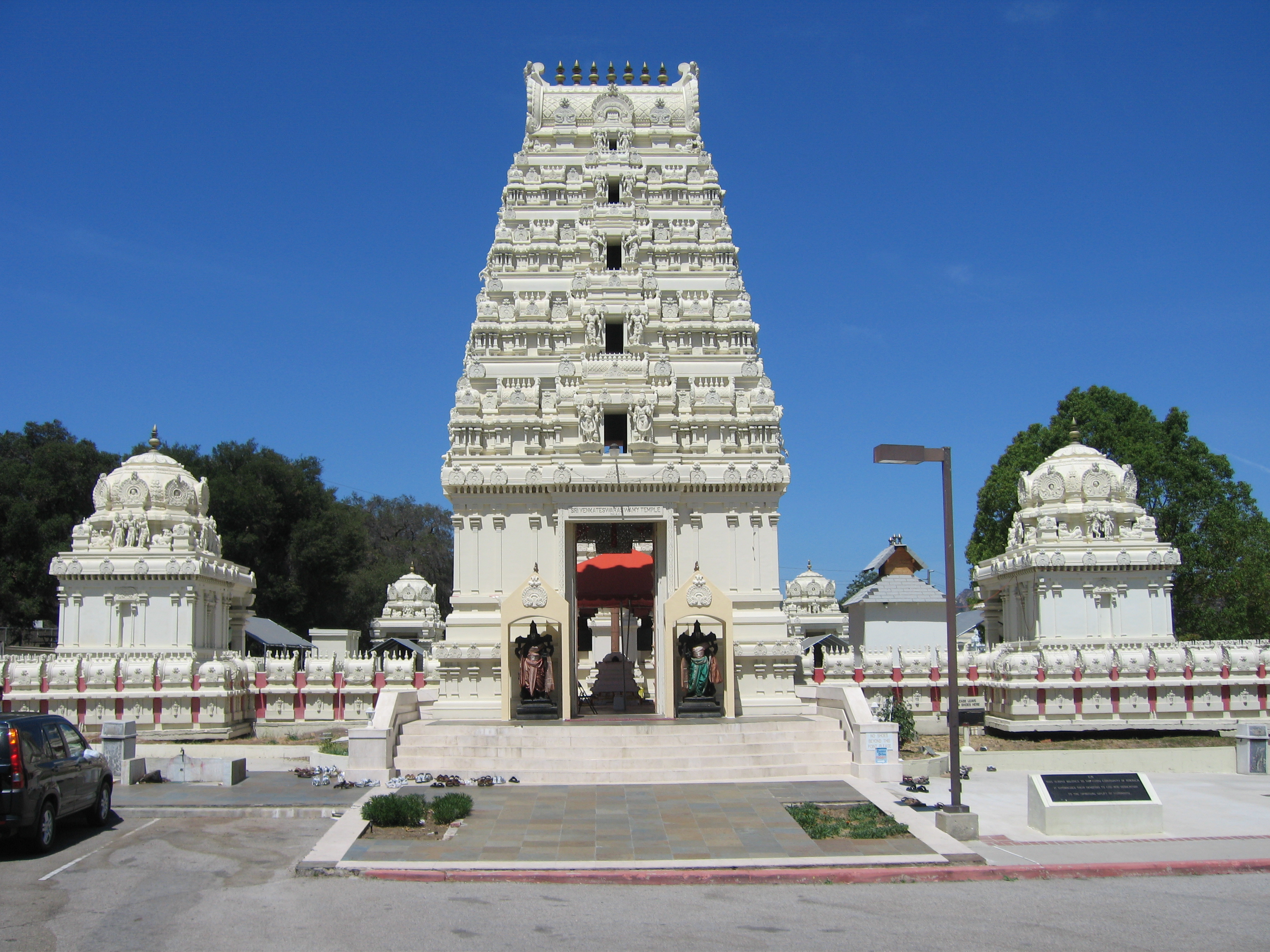

- Location within California

Religion
- Affiliation: Hinduism
- District: Santa Monica Mountains
- Deity: Venkateswara and Shiva
- Governing body: Board of the Hindu Temple Society of Southern California-President: Nadadur Sampath Kumar; Secretary: Giridhar Athreya; Treasurer: Venkateshwar Rao Bramharouthu; Vice President: Jayashree Manohara (as of 2021)

Location
- Location: 1600 Las Virgenes Road, Calabasas, 91302
- State: California
- Country: United States
- Coordinates: 34.095103°N 118.709687°W

Architecture
- Style: Dravidian
- Established: 1981

Website
- https://www.malibuhindutemple.org/

Malibu Hindu Temple is a Hindu temple in Calabasas, California, United States. It is located in the Santa Monica Mountains, off Malibu Canyon Road, near the city of Malibu. Built in 1981 and dedicated to the Hindu deity Venkateswara, it features traditional South Indian style and serves as a centre for Hindu worship and cultural events in Southern California. The temple is maintained by the Hindu Temple Society of Southern California and is led by priests who perform daily rituals and special ceremonies.

== History ==
Construction of the Malibu Hindu Temple, located in Calabasas, California, began in 1981. For a period of time, and until his death in July 2017, Indian American tax consultant Nadadur Vardhan served as the temple's president. Nadadur S. Kumar has served as the temple's president since 2021.

== Architecture and deities ==
The complex has two temples – the upper temple with Venkateswara as the presiding deity and the lower temple with Shiva as the presiding deity. Both temples are constructed of concrete to emulate the Dravidian architectural style. In addition to the presiding deity, both temples have shrines for other deities. The complex includes a smaller shrine at each of the four corners, dedicated to Rama, Lakshmi, Bhoodevi, and Krishna. It also has a fifth shrine dedicated to Hanuman.

== Notable visitors ==
In January 2006, the pop-star singer Britney Spears had her 4-month-old son blessed in a large ceremony by the Hindu priests of this temple. Congressman Brad Sherman also spoke at the temple on a few occasions.

== Gallery ==
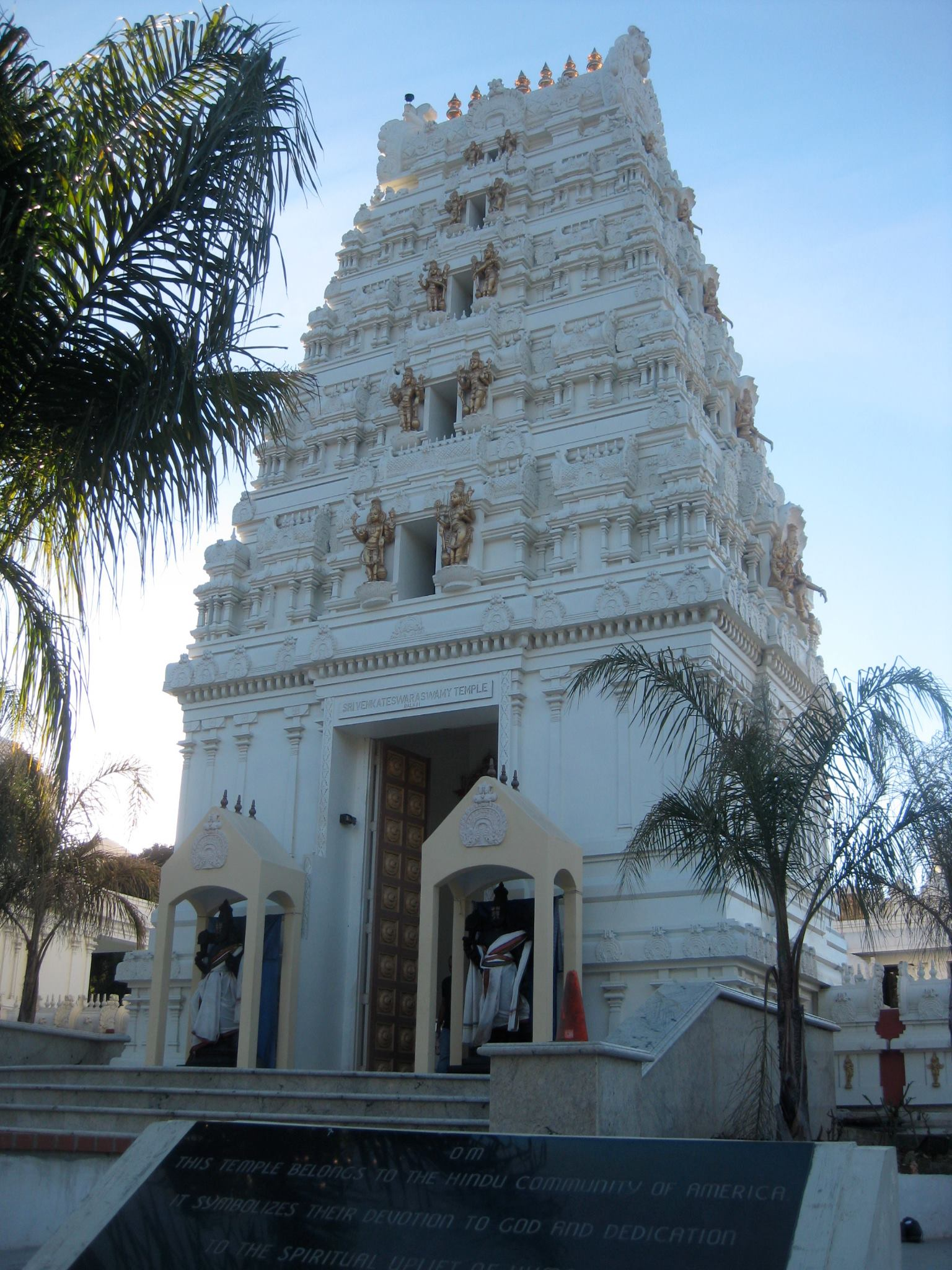
Temple entrance

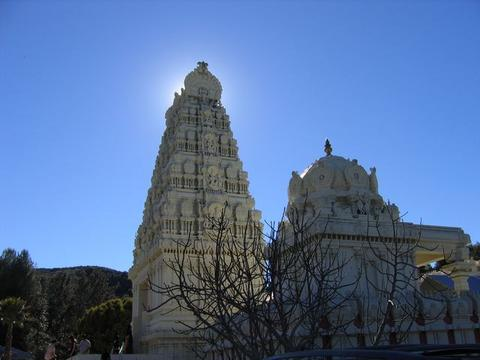
View of temple

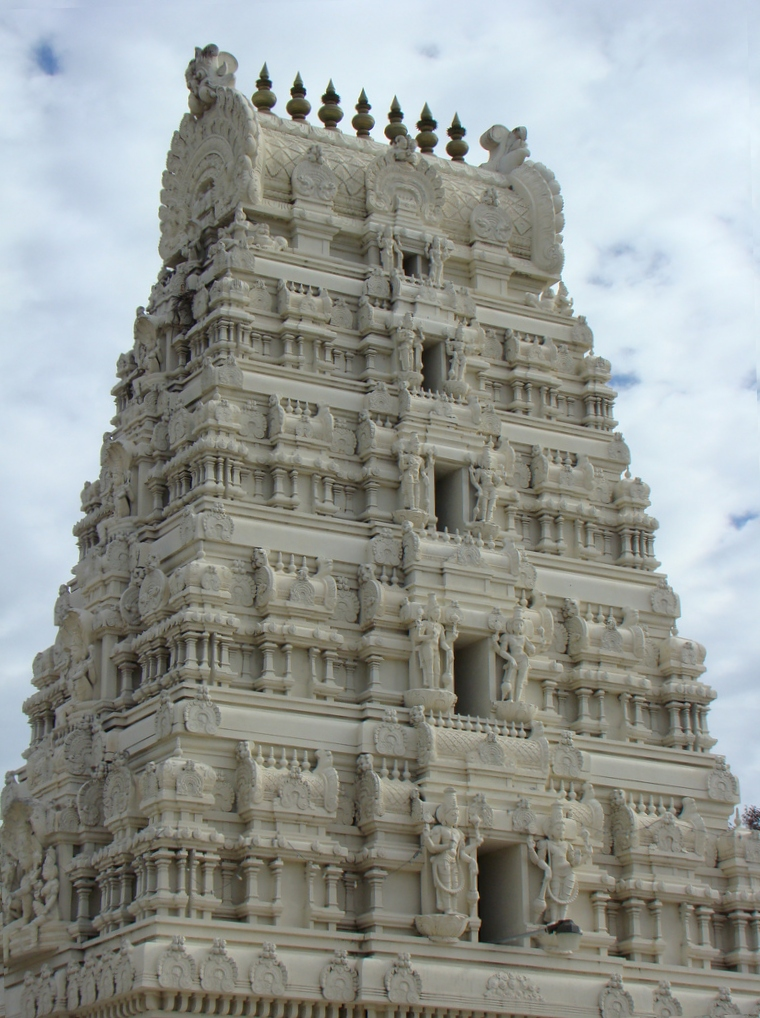
Another view of temple

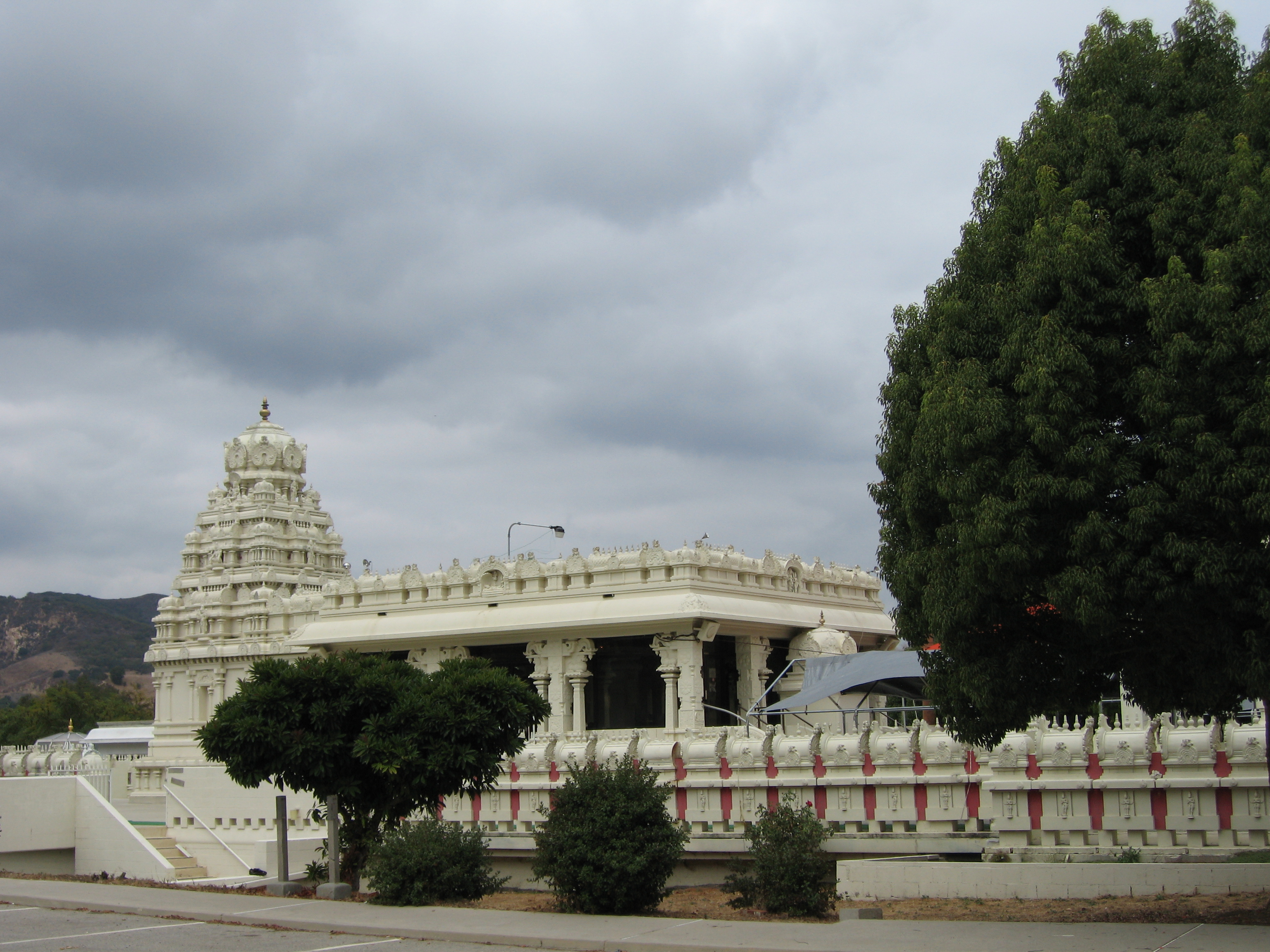
Side view of temple

== See also ==
- List of Hindu temples in the United States
