= Kanan Road/Kanan Dume Road =

Major road that traverses the Santa Monica Mountains in Los Angeles County, California

Kanan Road / Kanan Dume Road
- Part of: CR N9 between US 101 in Agoura Hills and SR 1 in Malibu
- Namesake: Kanan family, Point Dume
- Maintained by: Local city jurisdictions; Los Angeles County Department of Public Works
- Length: 19 mi (31 km)
- North end: Westlake Boulevard in Thousand Oaks
- Major junctions: US 101 in Agoura Hills
- South end: SR 1 in Malibu

Kanan Road / Kanan Dume Road is a major mostly north–south road that runs for 19 miles (31 km), connecting the Conejo Valley and U.S. Route 101 with California State Route 1 and Malibu in Ventura and Los Angeles counties. It is used by 40,000 commuters per day.

== Name ==
Kanan Road was named after the Kanan family, several of whom migrated from North Dakota to Hollywood in the 1940s, then acquired land in Agoura Hills in the 1950s. Kanan Dume Road was named as such because it was intended to extend Kanan Road to Point Dume.

== Route ==
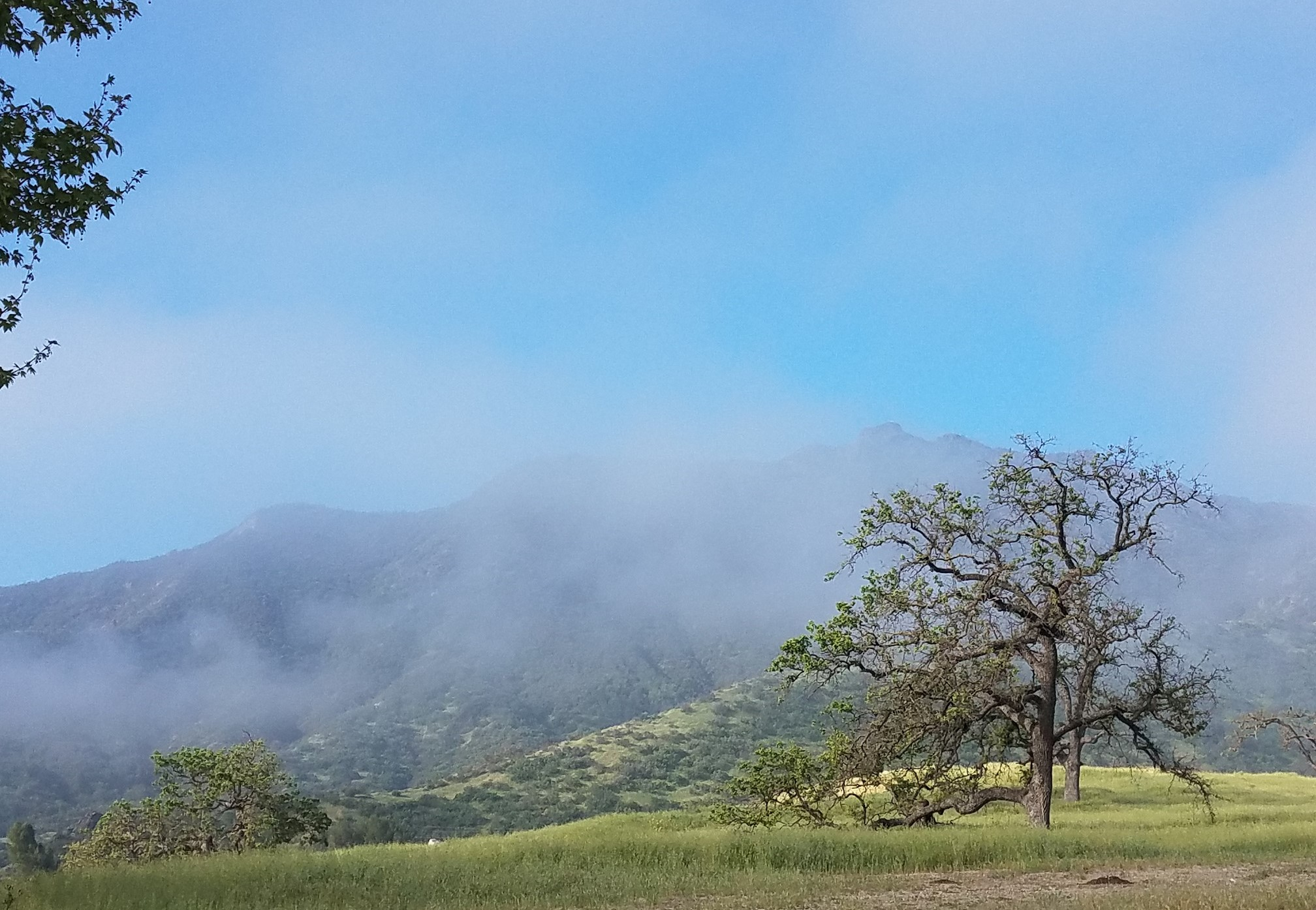
Agoura Hills viewed from Kanan Road

From the north, Kanan Road begins at Westlake Boulevard in Thousand Oaks in eastern Ventura County, then travels west for 5 miles (8.0 km) before crossing into Los Angeles County. The road then travels south, intersecting with U.S. Route 101 before entering the Santa Monica Mountains and rising to an elevation of 1,800 feet (550 m), where it intersects with Mulholland Highway. South of Mullholland, Kanan Road becomes Kanan Dume Road and continues through the Santa Monica Mountains to California State Route 1 in Malibu. The 12.5 miles (20.1 km) of Kanan and Kanan Dume Road between U.S. Route 101 and California State Route 1 are signed County Route N9. The southern-most 3 miles (4.8 km) of Kanan Dume Road feature an eight percent grade, with the final 800 feet (240 m) also featuring a 2.5 feet (0.76 m) deep, gravel filled, middle lane runaway truck ramp.

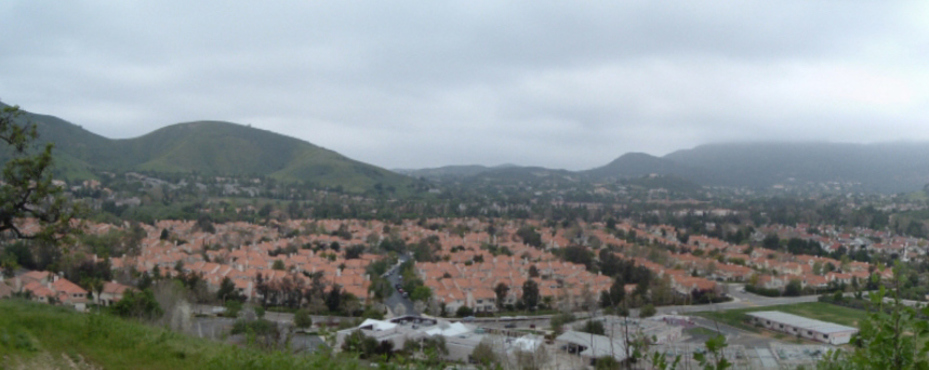
Kanan Road traveling through Oak Park

Communities that Kanan and Kanan Dume Road travel through include Thousand Oaks and Oak Park in Ventura County and Agoura Hills and Malibu in Los Angeles County. Kanan Road is a Los Angeles County Designated Disaster Route and is the primary evacuation route for much of Malibu and 5000 additional residents in unincorporated Agoura and Cornell.

Kanan Dume Road features three tunnels within the Santa Monica Mountains, named (from north to south) T-1, T-2, and T-3.

== History ==
Kanan Road was developed by Lou and Mark Boyar in 1964 as a way to connect their new community development Oak Park to U.S. Route 101 and the Santa Monica Mountains. Kanan Dume Road was completed in 1974, pushed through by Agoura Hills residents who wanted a quicker connection to the coast. Several congressmen including Barry Goldwater Jr. opposed Kanan Dume Road, as they believed it would lead to indiscriminate use of the Santa Monica Mountains, which they wished to preserve. Their efforts led to the creation of the Santa Monica Mountains National Recreation Area, which prevented extensive development in the area despite Kanan Dume Road being built.

After a series of crashes and resulting deaths, a runaway truck ramp was added to Kanan Dume Road's southern terminus in 1987. The maximum allowable weight for trucks was also dropped from 14,000 to 8,000 pounds that year.

== Notable landmarks ==
Notable landmarks on Kanan and Kanan Dume Road include (from south to north): Backbone Trail, Calamigos Ranch, Rocky Oaks Park, Mae Boyar Park, and Oak Park Library.

Schools on Kanan Road include (from southeast to northwest): Willow Elementary, Oak Park High, and Oak Hills Elementary.

== In popular culture ==
Star Wars character Kanan Jarrus, born Caleb Dume, was named after Kanan Dume Road. Kanan Road was also referenced in the 1979 song Music into Gold by John Stewart featuring Stevie Nicks.

Films shot on Kanan and Kanan Dume Road include Heaven Can Wait, Deep Impact, Poltergeist, and Phantasm.
