= Malibu Creek =

River in Southern California

Malibu Creek Malaga Creek Maliba Sequit Creek Malibo Creek Topanga Malibu Sequit Creek
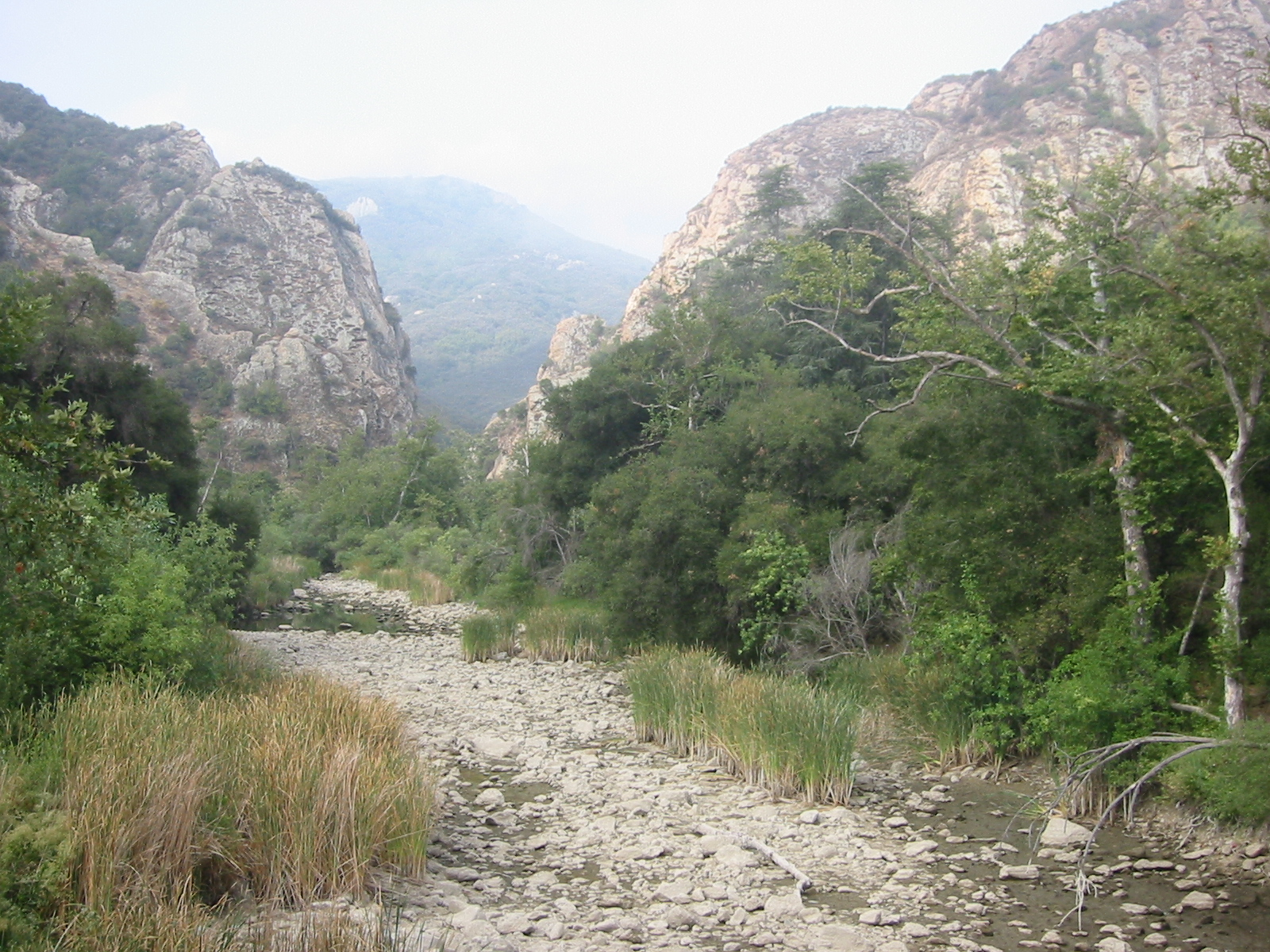
- Malibu Creek, dry river bed, with the Goat Buttes in the background

- Location of the mouth of Malibu Creek in California

Location
- Country: United States
- State: California
- Region: Los Angeles County

Physical characteristics
- Source
  - location: 4 mi (6 km)
  - coordinates: 34°07′22″N 118°47′38″W
- Source confluence: Triunfo Creek and Lobo Canyon Creek
  - elevation: 760 ft (230 m)
- Mouth: Malibu Lagoon then Santa Monica Bay, Pacific Ocean
  - location: Malibu, California
  - coordinates: 34°01′54″N 118°40′47″W
  - elevation: 3 ft (0.91 m)

Basin features
- Tributaries
  - left: Medea Creek, Las Virgenes Creek, Cold Creek

Malibu Creek is a year-round stream in western Los Angeles County, California. It drains the southern Conejo Valley and Simi Hills, flowing south through the Santa Monica Mountains, and enters Santa Monica Bay in Malibu.

== Distribution ==
The Malibu Creek watershed drains 109 square miles (280 km^{2}) and its tributary creeks reach as high as 3,000 feet (910 m) into Ventura County. The creek's mainstem begins south of Westlake Village at the confluence of Triunfo Creek and Lobo Canyon Creek, and flows 13.4 miles (21.6 km) to Malibu Lagoon.

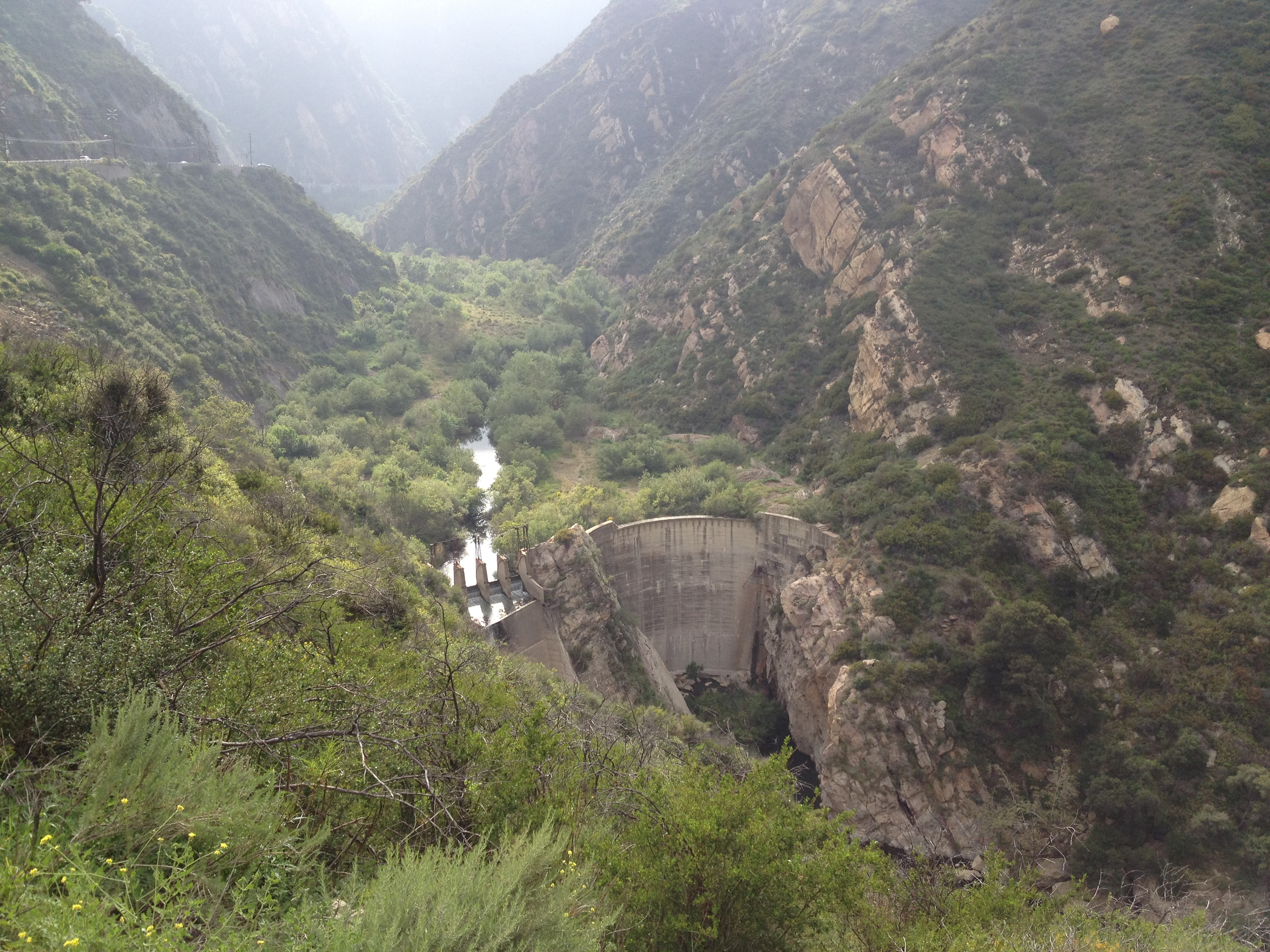
Malibu Canyon

Malibu Canyon is a chief pass through the mountains, and Malibu Canyon Road is a major north–south route connecting the coast to the inland valley. Malibu Creek starts at Malibou Lake, which is held back by the Malibu Lake Dam. Further downstream, the creek waterfalls 100 feet (30 m) over the Rindge Dam, then carves its final path into Malibu Lagoon.

== History ==
The area around Malibu Creek was for centuries a major area of Native American life, and the boundary between the Chumash tribes, who lived to the northwest, and the Gabrieliño, to the south and east, was located here.

The origin of the creek's name likely derives from the Chumash term U-mali-wu, which means "it makes a loud noise there". The Spanish recorded this as 'Malibu', and this spelling appears in the Topanga Malibu Sequit land grant on July 12, 1805.

Sections of the creek were dammed in 1903, 1922, and 1924. Malibu Canyon Road opened to automobile traffic in 1952.

== Watershed ==
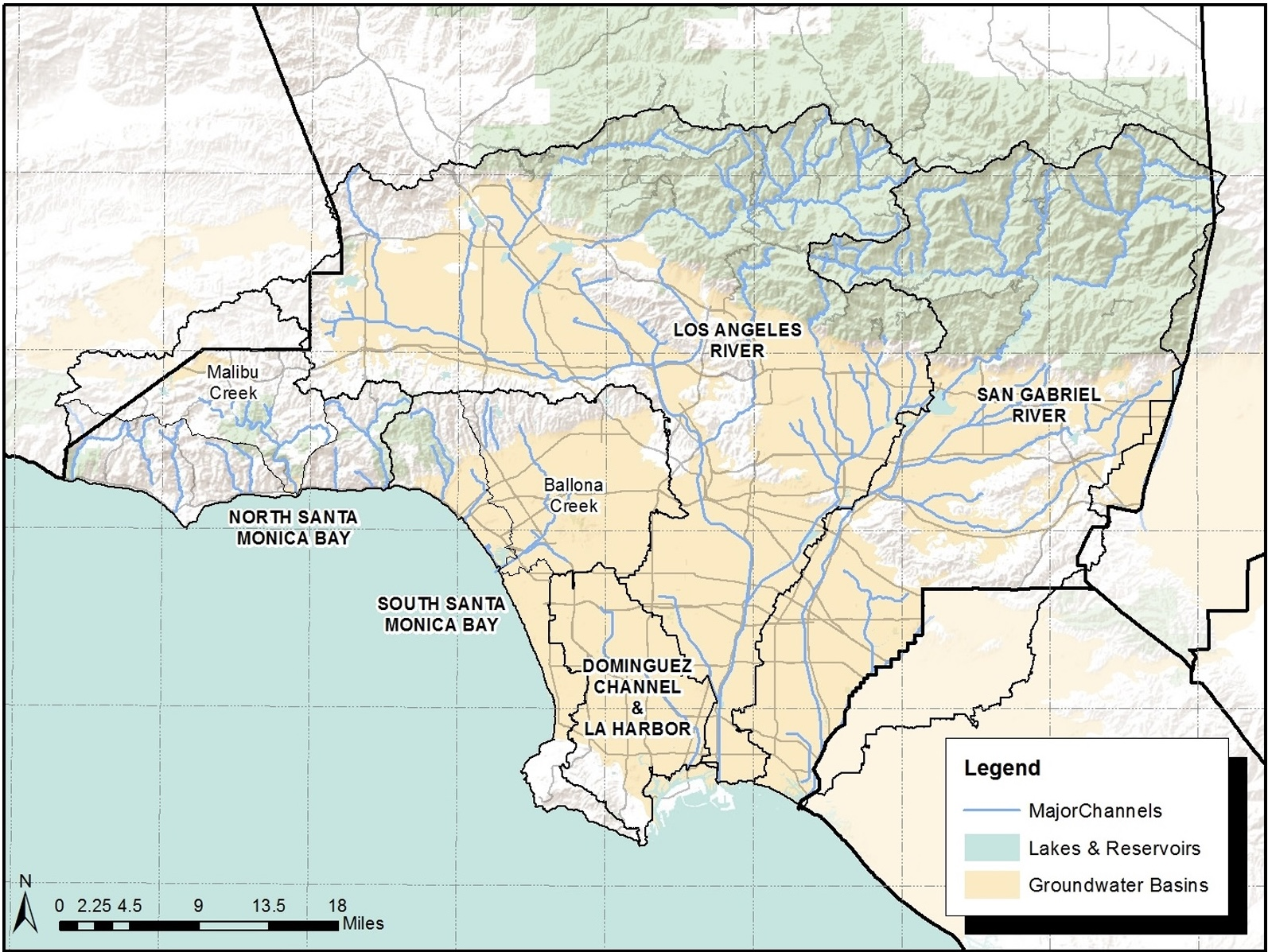
Watersheds of Los Angeles County, California, including Malibu Creek

Malibu Creek has several tributaries draining the Santa Monica Mountains. These include streams draining to Lake Sherwood, and thence via Potrero Valley Creek to Westlake Lake, then down Triunfo Creek to its confluence with Lobo Canyon Creek which is the origin of Malibu Creek. Amongst many other tributaries are Medea Creek, Las Virgenes Creek and Cold Creek. Medea Creek and Malibu Creek join to form Malibu Lake. Further downstream Las Virgenes Creek joins Malibu Creek at Malibu Creek State Park.

== River modifications ==
The Rindge Dam becomes a 100-foot (30 m) waterfall in Malibu Creek State Park, emptying into a perennial deep pool. Eventually the creek empties into the 13-acre (53,000 m^{2}) Malibu Lagoon.

Tapia Water Reclamation Facility discharges treated wastewater into the creek. Las Virgenes Municipal Water District discharges water into the creek when the flow falls below 2.5 feet per second (0.76 m/s) to maintain the aquatic habitat for steelhead trout and other threatened and endangered species. The National Marine Fisheries Service requires the discharge into the creek by the district to comply with environmental mandates. The district has also supplied water for the large lake within the master-planned community of Westlake Village when the supplies from their wells are insufficient. Even during the dry summer months, water from the lake must be released into the creek in compliance with an agreement between the California State Water Resources Control Board and the Westlake Lake Management Association. The association is a private entity that oversees the operation of the lake that is surrounded by homes and businesses within the watershed of Malibu Creek.

== Ecology ==
Malibu Creek and its surrounding area is home to a wide range of flora and fauna endemic to the region. These include a variety of wildflowers, valley oaks, and sycamore trees, as well as a small group of Redwood trees, planted along Century Lake to maintain a lower temperature. Moreover, amphibians such as newts, salamanders, toads, and frogs are found in the creek, while many other animals, including turtles, herons, and a mountain lion, as well as many other animals, all rely on the creek and its inhabitants.

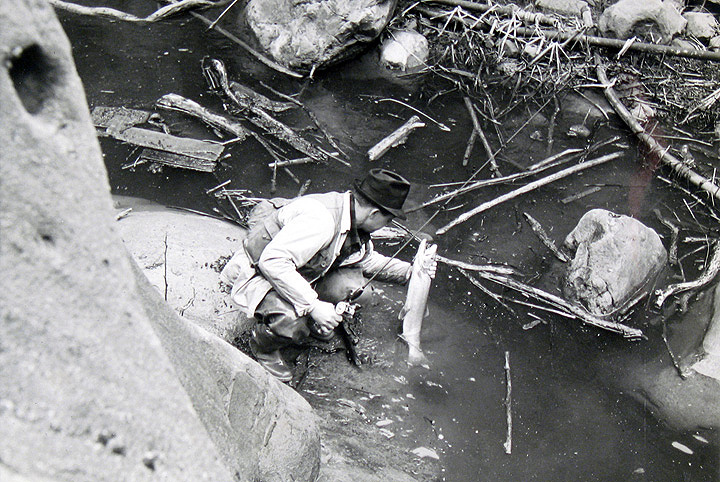
Malibu Creek Steelhead (c.1943)

It is estimated that Steelhead (Oncorhyncus mykiss irideus) populations within the Southern California Coast Steelhead Distinct population segment (DPS) have declined dramatically from annual runs totaling 32,000-46,000 adults to less than 500 returning adult fish. This estimate is based largely on the four major steelhead-bearing watersheds, Santa Ynez River, Ventura River, Santa Clara River, and Malibu Creek. Genetic analysis of the steelhead in all four of these watersheds has shown them to be of native and not hatchery stocks. A sand berm across the mouth of the Malibu Creek Lagoon blocks the stream to ocean-based steelhead except during the rainy winter season when high flows breach the berm and opens access to the estuary. The fish quickly reach an impassable barrier presented by the 98 feet (30 m) high Rindge Dam, restricting them to the lowest 2.0 miles (3.2 km) of more than 70 miles (112 km) of historic steelhead habitat. The dam, originally built for water storage and flood control in 1926, no longer functions as the reservoir is completely filled with sediment. Over the past decade several government agencies and non-profit organizations have been trying to remove the dam to restore access to upstream spawning habitat. In 1997, the southern Evolutionarily Significant Unit (ESU) of steelhead trout was added to the federal list of endangered species, with Malibu Creek as the southernmost boundary. Since 1997, the protected range of this ESU has been extended to the U.S./Mexican border. The National Marine Fisheries Service (NMFS) estimates that only 500 anadromous adults remain within this ESU (NMFS 2007). In summer, 2006, there was a massive die off of native and exotic fish and invertebrates in Malibu Creek, thought to be due to a combination of pollution, high temperatures and low oxygen. The steelhead trout population fell to zero by November, 2006. Surveys in summer 2008 documented five returning adult steelhead over 20 inches (50 cm), and over 2,200 smolts under 3.9 inches (10 cm) were also recorded.

The rare plant Malibu baccharis (Baccharis malibuensis) is endemic to the Malibu Creek drainage. Introduced crayfish are a problem as they devour the native fish, aquatic insects, and newts along with eggs and tadpoles of frogs and toads.

== Geology ==
Malibu Creek runs through a section of the Santa Monica Mountains, which is, in part, largely covered by the Conejo Volcanics, a Miocene volcanic field. Several sections of volcanic rock, including the Conejo Volcanics, were formed along the coast of California by significant shifts in the tectonic plate boundaries found along the North American west coast, forcing magma through the crust, which cooled into the rock formations seen today.

== Parks ==
Virtually all of the Malibu Creek watershed falls within the Santa Monica Mountains National Recreation Area; most of Malibu Creek was included in Malibu Creek State Park in 1976. The section near Century Lake is especially popular with swimmers, climbers, and photographers.

== See also ==
- The Rock Store
