= The Rock Store =

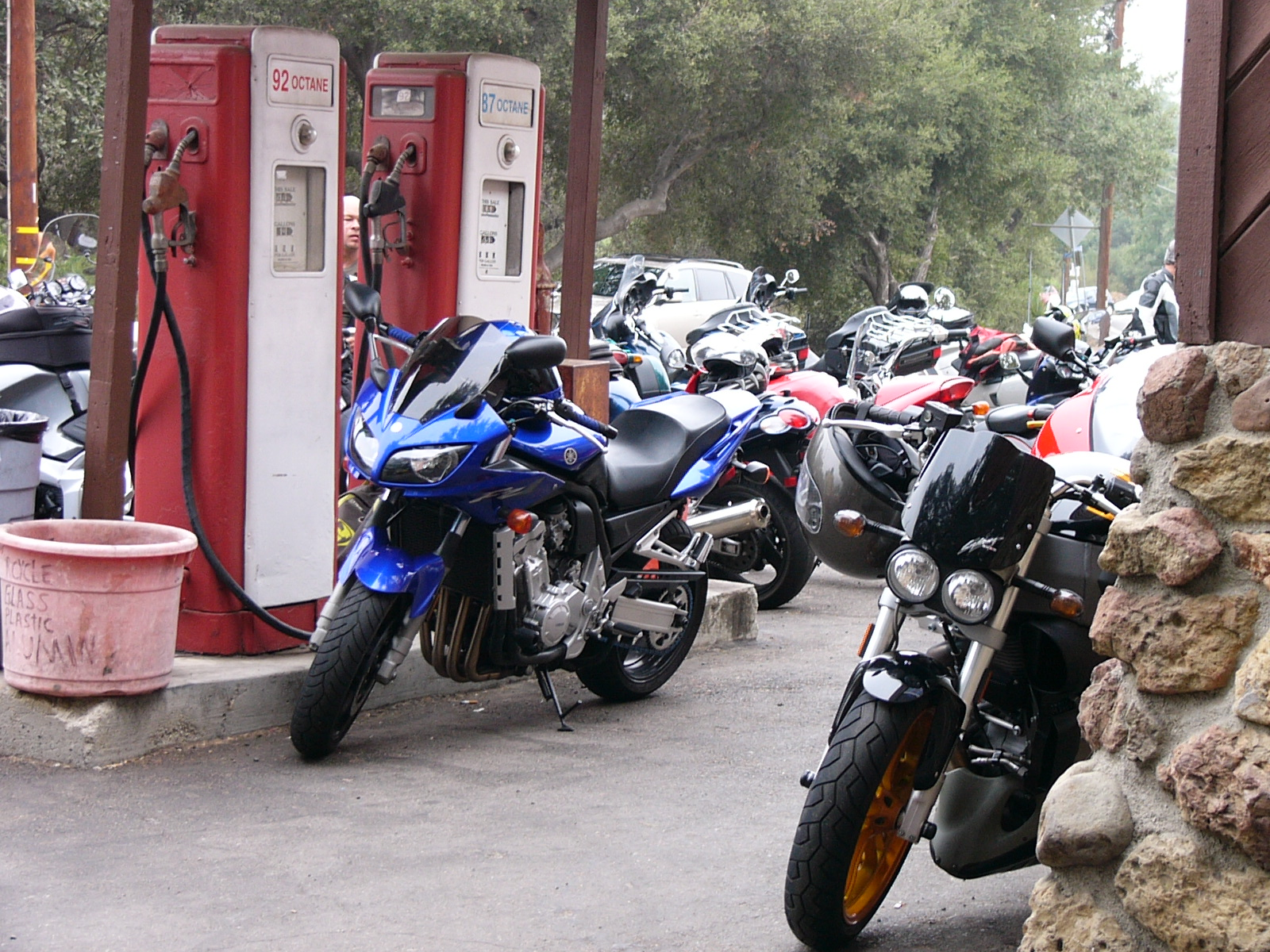
- Interactive map of The Rock Store

Restaurant information
- Location: 30354 Mulholland Highway, Cornell, California, 91301, United States
- Coordinates: 34.109585°N 118.788173°W
- Website: Official website

The Rock Store is a restaurant in Cornell, on Mulholland Highway in the Santa Monica Mountains, Los Angeles, California. It is popular with motorcyclists and celebrities.

== History ==
It is a, "humble but infamous hangout is like a church for wayward souls Whose paths to Heaven are found with throttle in hand," in the words of Zapata Espinoza writing for Mountain Bike magazine, "The gathering of the tribe at the Rock Store is unlike any other. There are... over-revving canyon racers in their full-leather regalia, celebrities riding [expensive bikes], vintage old-timers on ratty Indians, bourgeois bikers with their chaps and Nike Air-Stupids, dual-sport riders in their MX gear, freaks on V-8 powered trikes—there's even a group of two-wheeled Freemasons. It's a wonderful collection of humanity and two wheels where diversity isn't just tolerated, it's celebrated."

The location originally held a hot springs resort. During the Great Depression and Prohibition, the owner was allegedly a bootlegger. The resort attracted celebrities such as Cecil B. DeMille and Rudolph Valentino, who "came up here and laid in the hot water baths, and they drank the whiskey". In the 1940s and 1950s, it was home to a gas station. The Rock Store opened in 1961 as a grocery store, later becoming a common motorcycle pit stop.

It attracted motorcyclists and celebrities, including Tom Arnold, Robert Blake, James Cameron, Harrison Ford, John Goodman, Hulk Hogan, Billy Idol, Jesse James, k.d. lang, Matt LeBlanc, Jay Leno, Steve McQueen, Nick Nolte, Arnold Schwarzenegger, John Travolta, Barry Van Dyke, and Eddie Van Halen. The Wall Street Journal has called it, "a celebrity hangout where Hollywood's motorcycle riders like to congregate", and the Los Angeles Times referred to it as "one of best-known biker pit stops in the world" and the "Mecca of motorcycles".

It is located at 30354 Mulholland Highway, Cornell, California. Ed and Veronica "Vern" Savko have run The Rock Store since they purchased it in 1963. Ed Savko died in April 2012.

== Police presence ==
The California Highway Patrol have paid special attention to the area. In 1986, 240 customers were cited in a single day. In 1989, the CHP established a roadblock to crack down on illegal motorcycle racing near The Rock Store. This two-mile closure led to a temporary 85% drop in business.
