= Peter Strauss Ranch =

Regional park in Los Angeles County, CA operated by the National Park Service

Coordinates: 34°06′48″N 118°46′48″W

The Peter Strauss Ranch is a regional park unit of the Santa Monica Mountains National Recreation Area - and operated by the National Park Service as Peter Strauss Ranch Park. It is located in the central Santa Monica Mountains — on Mulholland Highway near Agoura Hills, Southern California, in the Western United States. The ranch is named after the actor Peter Strauss, who was the last private owner-resident of the property. Much of the ranch was destroyed during the Woolsey Fire in November 2018.

== Geography ==
The Peter Strauss Ranch Park is noted for its extensive California oak woodlands and montane chaparral habitats traversed by a walking path and hiking trail. The moister area along Triunfo Creek has a riparian zone density of plants and animals. The park's habitats represent the California chaparral and woodlands Ecoregion - with the diverse species of the flora of the Santa Monica Mountains.

Recreational facilities, beyond trails, also include guided nature walks and programs, a swimming pool and the Lake Enchanto Dam, and a stone ranch house with a large terrazzo patio available for outdoor social events, including concerts, weddings, picnics, and art exhibits.

== History ==
The area was inhabited by the Chumash people for up to 8,000 years. After Spanish colonization of Alta California, it was taken to become part of the Rancho Las Virgenes land grant. After California became one of the United States in 1850, the area was surveyed in 1881 to confirm the grant's land patent. A California live oak (Quercus agrifolia) that was used as a marker in the survey still stands, just west of the swimming pool, with an upside-down letter "T" still visible in the bark.

=== 20th century ===
In the early 20th century, the automobile manufacturer Harry Miller, famous for his patented master carburetor featured at the Indianapolis 500, purchased the ranch as a weekend retreat from his factory and residence in Los Angeles. In 1926, Miller built the current stone ranch house, the look-out tower, and the aviary. He held grand parties there during Prohibition, having someone watch for the cops from the tower. The man would then run to the house to warn them to put the booze away. Miller also maintained a private zoo on the grounds. During the Great Depression, Miller suffered financial ruin after attempting to build aircraft engines, forcing him to sell the property.

In the mid-1930s, the property was purchased by Warren Shobert and Arthur Edeson, who renamed the property "Shoson" and transformed it into a recreational fairyland resort for children and adults. The Lake Encanto Dam, creating Lake Encanto, was constructed on Triunfo Creek. The resort was later renamed "Lake Enchanto." Competition from other, larger amusement parks and resorts led to the decline of Lake Enchanto, which fell into disrepair and closed around 1960.

In 1976, actor Peter Strauss purchased the property after being moved by the area's natural beauty while filming the mini-series Rich Man, Poor Man at nearby Malibu Lake. Strauss restored the property to a more natural look and lived there until 1983, when he sold it to the Santa Monica Mountains Conservancy. The National Park Service purchased the ranch in 1987.

=== Woolsey Fire damage ===
On November 14, 2018, the Los Angeles Times published images showing ruined structures on the site and reported that the Ranch was reduced to "charred remnants." The stage was rebuilt in the natural amphitheater and concerts resumed in 2022.

== See also ==
- Flora of the Santa Monica Mountains
