= Goat Buttes =

Geological feature in Malibu, California, United States

Coordinates: 34.103°N 118.714°W

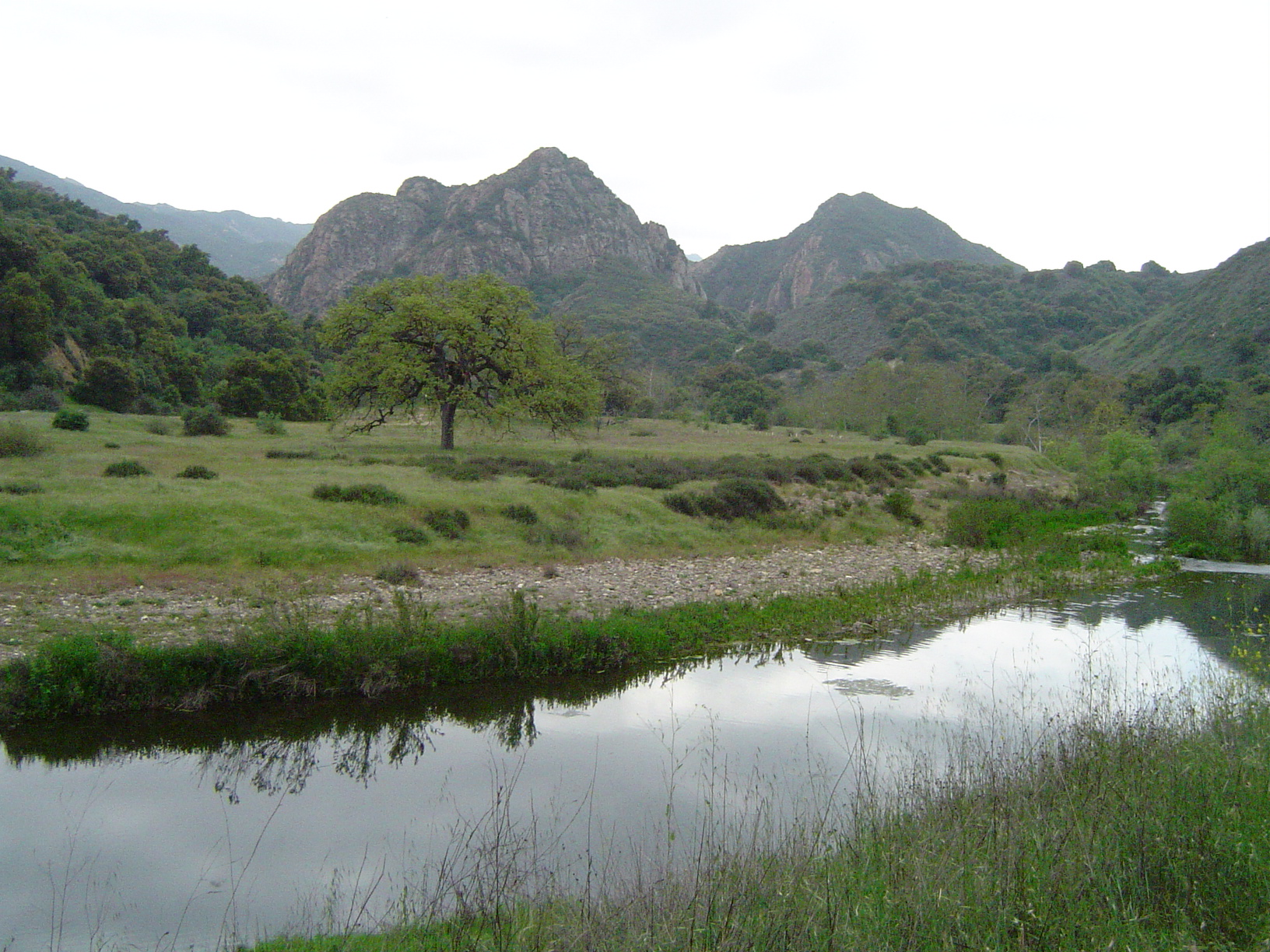
Goat Buttes in the background in Malibu Creek State Park

The Goat Buttes are a group of sandstone outcroppings located along the Backbone Trail in Malibu, California. The area is locally famous for the 'Morrison Cave', a spot which was frequented by Jim Morrison in the 1960s. The Goat Buttes are located in the southwestern corner of Malibu Creek State Park, at the north end of Corral Canyon Road.
