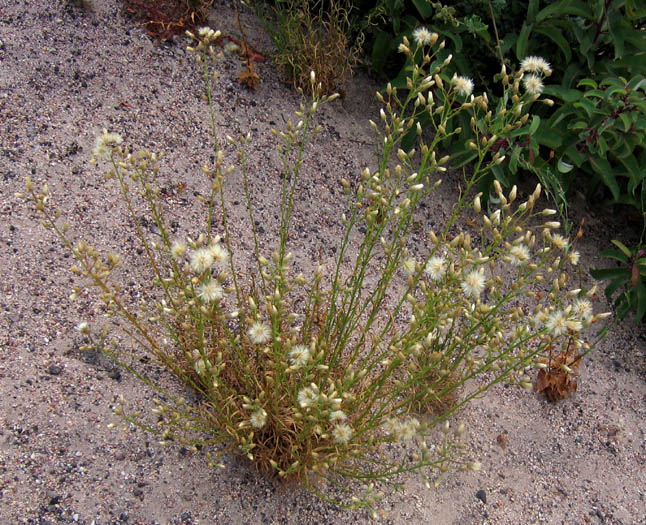

Conservation status
- Critically Imperiled (NatureServe)

Scientific classification
- Kingdom: Plantae
- Clade: Embryophytes
- Clade: Tracheophytes
- Clade: Spermatophytes
- Clade: Angiosperms
- Clade: Eudicots
- Clade: Asterids
- Order: Asterales
- Family: Asteraceae
- Genus: Baccharis
- Species: B. malibuensis

Binomial name
- Baccharis malibuensis R.M.Beauch. & Henrickson

= Baccharis malibuensis =

Malibu baccharis

Species of flowering plant

Baccharis malibuensis is a rare California species of shrubs in the family Asteraceae known by the common name Malibu baccharis.

It is endemic to southern California. It was first recognized as a distinct taxon in the Malibu Creek drainage in the Santa Monica Mountains near Malibu. Other populations have since been located in Ventura, Los Angeles, Orange, and San Diego Counties. It grows in chaparral, coastal sage scrub, and oak woodlands. Most of the occurrences contain fewer than 200 individual plants. The species was described to science only in 1995.

This is a shrub generally growing 40-100 centimeters (16-40 inches) in height, and known to exceed 2 meters (80 inches) at times. The erect stems have a woody base and are mostly hairless, but may be sparsely hairy near the ends of the branches. The narrow, widely spaced leaves are linear or lance-shaped and smooth-edged or slightly serrated, and measure 1.5 to 6.5 centimeters in length but only a few millimeters in width. They are glandular and hairless or with few hairs. The inflorescence is an elongated cluster of many flower heads containing twenty to thirty or more male or female flowers. The fruit is a hairy achene tipped with a plumelike white pappus about 7 millimeters long.

Threats to this species include off-road vehicles and urban development.
