= Century Lake =

Artificial lake in California, United States

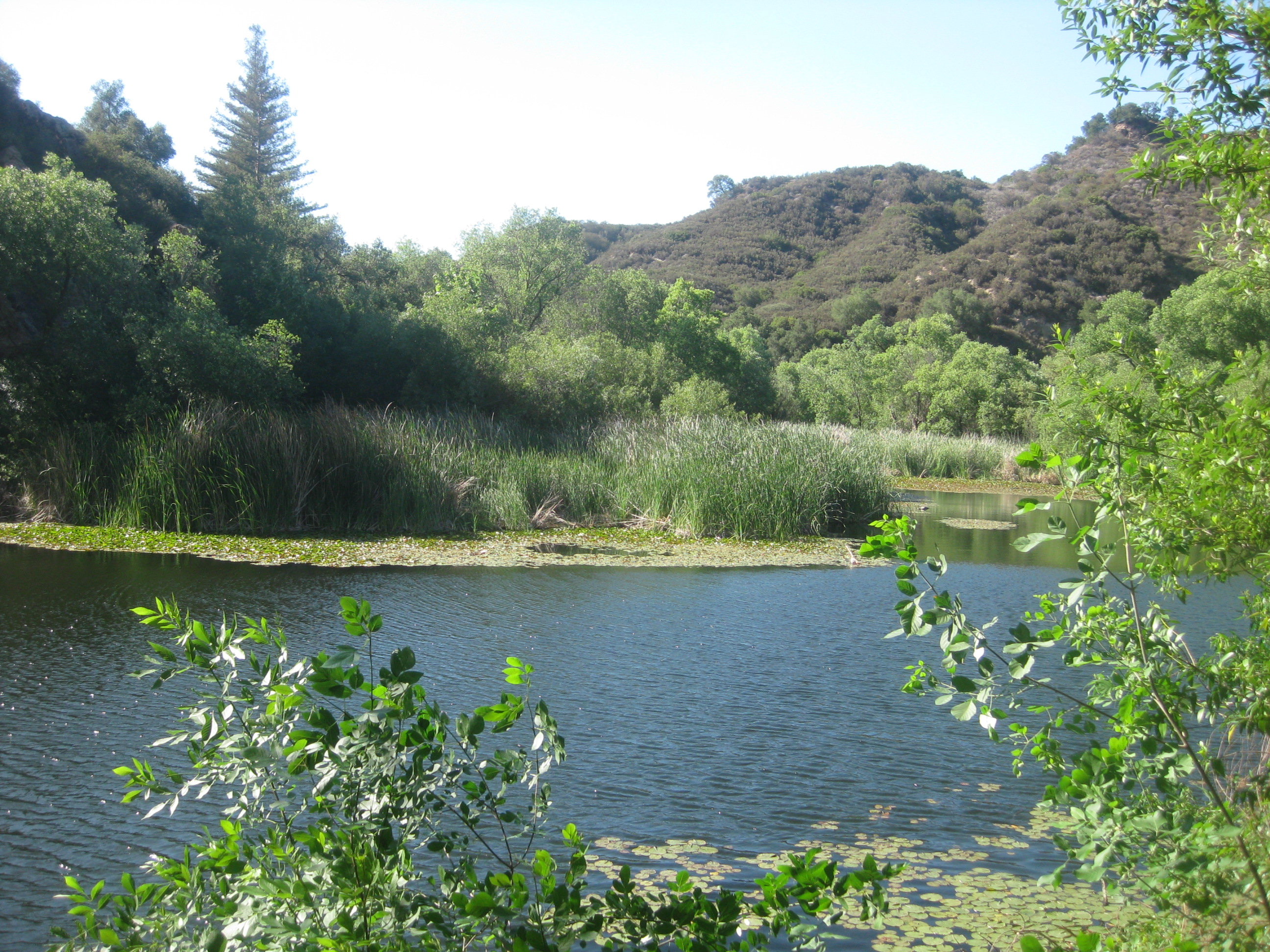
- Century Lake in May 2013.
- Interactive map of Century Lake
- Location: Santa Monica Mountains, California
- Coordinates: 34°05′59″N 118°44′02″W
- Primary inflows: Malibu Creek
- Primary outflows: Malibu Creek
- Built: 1910
- Surface elevation: 204 metres (669 ft)

Century Lake is an artificial lake in the Santa Monica Mountains of the U.S. state of California, constructed in 1910 as part of the Crags country club by the creation of a 50-foot-tall dam on Malibu Creek. It is named after 20th Century Fox, which owned the site from 1946 to 1974. In 1974 the lake became part of Malibu Creek State Park. The lake is also near the film sites of M*A*S*H and Planet of the Apes.
