= Malibou Lake, California =

Reservoir and community in Los Angeles County, California

Malibou Lake
- Location within the Los Angeles metropolitan area Location within California Location within the United States

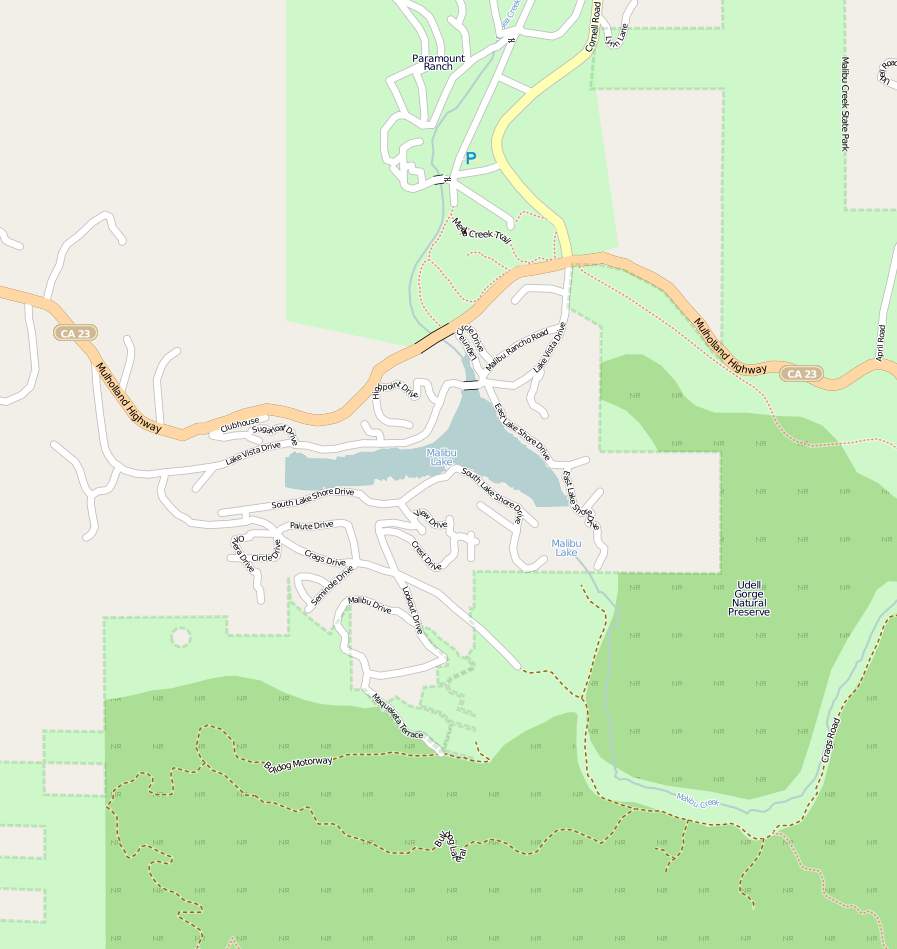
- Malibou Lake in Los Angeles
- Location: Los Angeles County, California, United States
- Coordinates: 34.107°N 118.757°W
- Lake type: reservoir
- Primary inflows: From the Medea and the Triunfo creeks
- Primary outflows: Outlet from dam into Malibu Creek
- Basin countries: United States
- Surface area: 350 acres (140 ha)
- Max. depth: 27 feet (8.2 m)
- Shore length^{1}: 1.9 mi (3 km)
- ^{1} Shore length is not a well-defined measure.

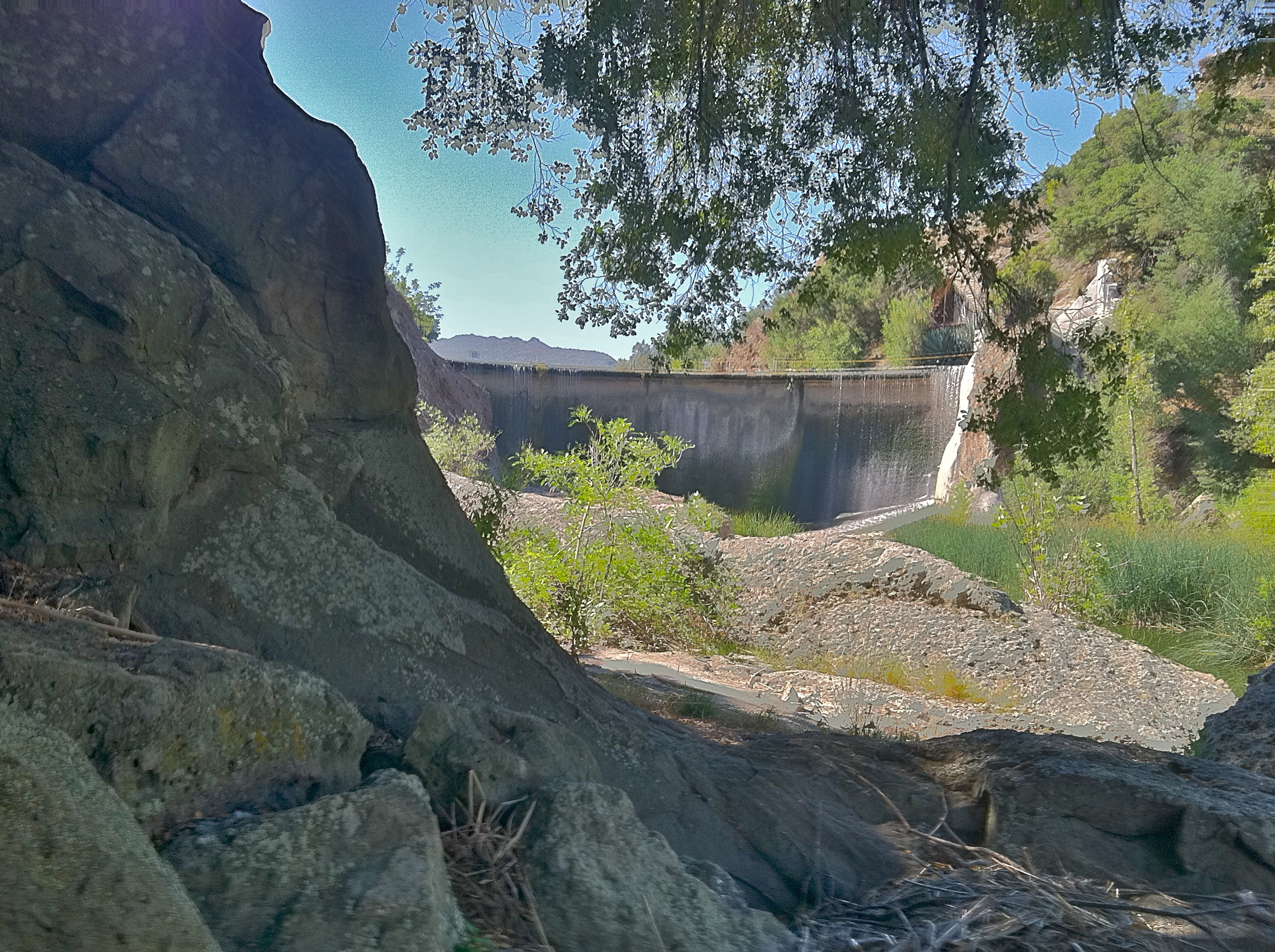
Malibou Dam in 2011, as seen from Malibu Creek State Park

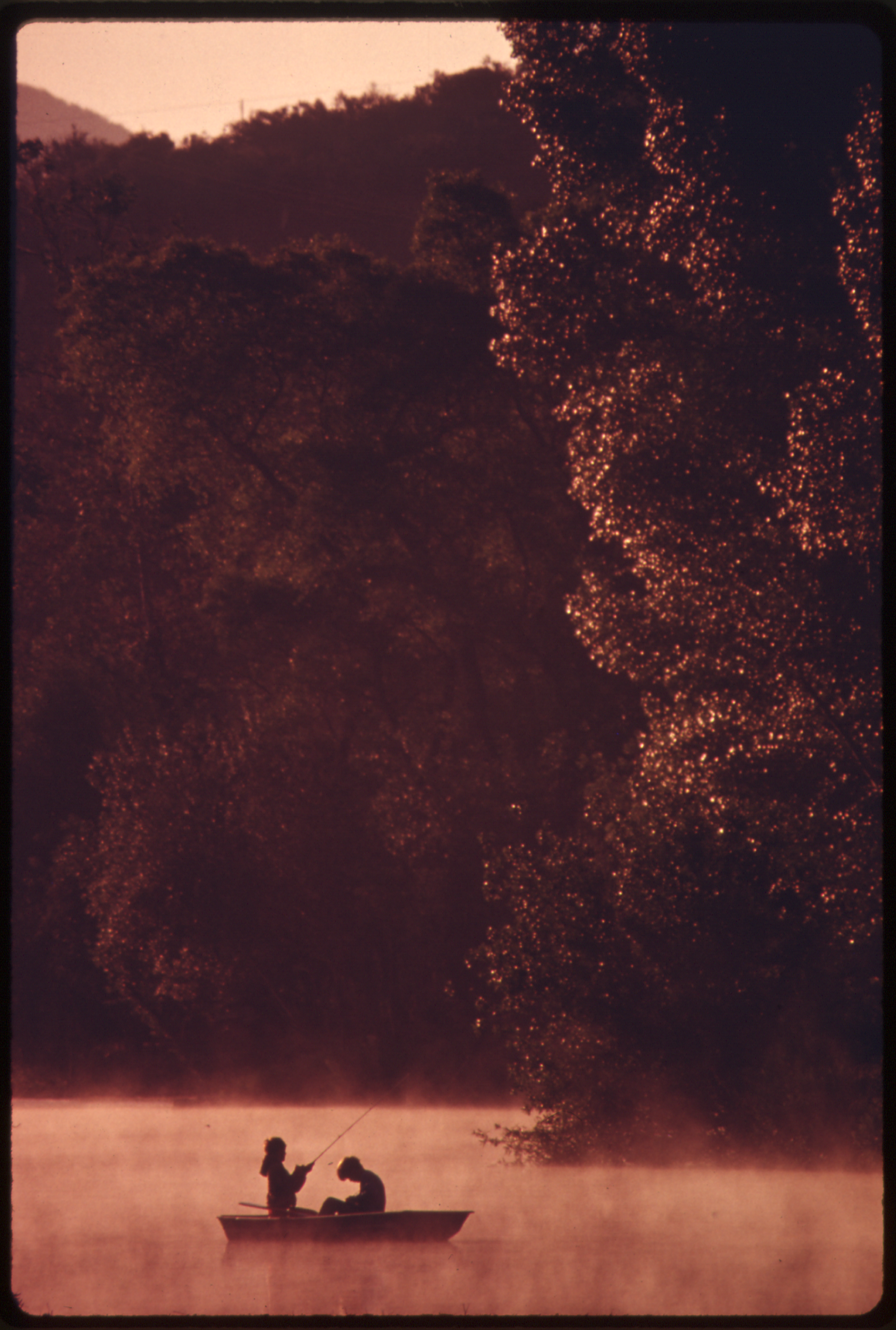
Fishing on Malibou Lake, 1975. Photo by Charles O'Rear.

Malibou Lake is a small reservoir surrounded by a residential development in the Santa Monica Mountains near Agoura Hills, California. Adjacent to Malibu Creek State Park and within the Santa Monica Mountains National Recreation Area, it is situated between Malibu Beach and the Conejo Valley. It was created in 1922 after the Malibu Lake Club Dam was built at the confluence of two creeks. The lake, and community of 250 residents are private.

The 350 acres (140 ha) site includes rugged mountain terrain, exclusive ranch houses, cabins and a club, It has been a popular venue for filming due to its proximity to the Hollywood studios. About 100 Hollywood movies have been filmed since the silent film period.

== Etymology ==
The territory of the Chumash, Native Americans, extended loosely from the San Joaquin Valley to San Luis Obispo to Malibu, as well as several islands off the southern coast of California. They named this region "Humaliwo" or "the surf sounds loudly." This name was included within the name of Rancho Topanga Malibu Sequit. The "o" was added to avoid confusion with Malibu Lagoon.

== History ==
In 1922, George Wilson and Bertram Lackey bought 350 acres (140 ha) of land near Cornell with the vision of creating a remote residential community surrounding a lake. In 1922, they formed the Malibou Lake Club (later the Malibou Lake Mountain Club). For nearly four years Malibou "Lake" remained dry. Because of this, the Malibou Lake Mountain Club received criticism from early cabin owners, who had purchased properties for up to $700 along roads such as "Lakeside Drive". Finally on April 5, 1926, a storm produced nearly five inches (130 mm) of rain. The hillsides nearby drained millions of gallons of water into Medea and Triunfo creeks and Malibou Lake was filled for the first time. The founding members threw a party that lasted for days. The club land is rich with live oak and sycamore trees, and the trees of the riparian woodland.

Built in 1924, the Malibou Lake Clubhouse had 24 bedrooms, a lounge, a dining room, a stage, locker rooms, a trading post, a tennis court, rowboats, and swimming/changing facilities. It was replaced with a smaller structure after the clubhouse burned down in 1936.

The 1936 clubhouse by early Los Angeles architectural firm Russell and Alpaugh stands today. The Malibou Lake Mountain Club clubhouse has a 2100 sq ft ballroom and a 475 sqft receiving room, a 1500 sqft patio, immediately adjacent gardens, a swimming pool and a tennis court and 18 ensuite 10' x 13' club member guest rooms (guest rooms not in use).

Winter rains were expected to refill the lake in late 1959 when state safety officials had the lake partially drained so the dam could be inspected. Attempts by a rainmaker to resurrect it were initially unsuccessful. The rains finally poured down in 1961 and refilled the lake. The community of Malibu Lake has proved successful in preserving the lake area and resisting various proposals for mass development in the area.

=== Woolsey Fire ===
The 2018 Woolsey Fire burned through the area, destroying more than 30 homes.

== Geography ==
Malibou Lake is located in the Santa Monica Mountains, half a mile south of Mulholland Highway, and over the hill, north of Malibu. The Ventura (101) Freeway is approximately 3 miles (4.8 km) to the north. The Malibou Lake area includes parts of Point Dume and Thousand Oaks. The lake sits at the bottom of a sharp defile where the confluence of Medea and Triunfo Creeks forms Malibu Creek. Here, the canyon floor widens into a valley that includes the lake, which occasionally dries out.

The lake is situated in the midst of the Santa Monica Mountains Recreation Area. The lake periphery measures 1.9 mi (3 km) with homes along the shore. The depth of water in the lake ranges to 25 ft.

The Santa Monica mountains and the Agoura hills, which form the catchment of the lake, and the creeks which drain into the lake are adjacent to Malibu Creek State Park. These locations were part of the CBS-TV series M*A*S*H and a ranch where Ronald Reagan came to relax.

A gated dam-bridge is located at the lake's southern end. When the area receives 4 inches (100 mm) or more of rain, the lake often overflows. The water flows down Malibu Creek to the ocean at the Malibu Lagoon.

== Film location ==
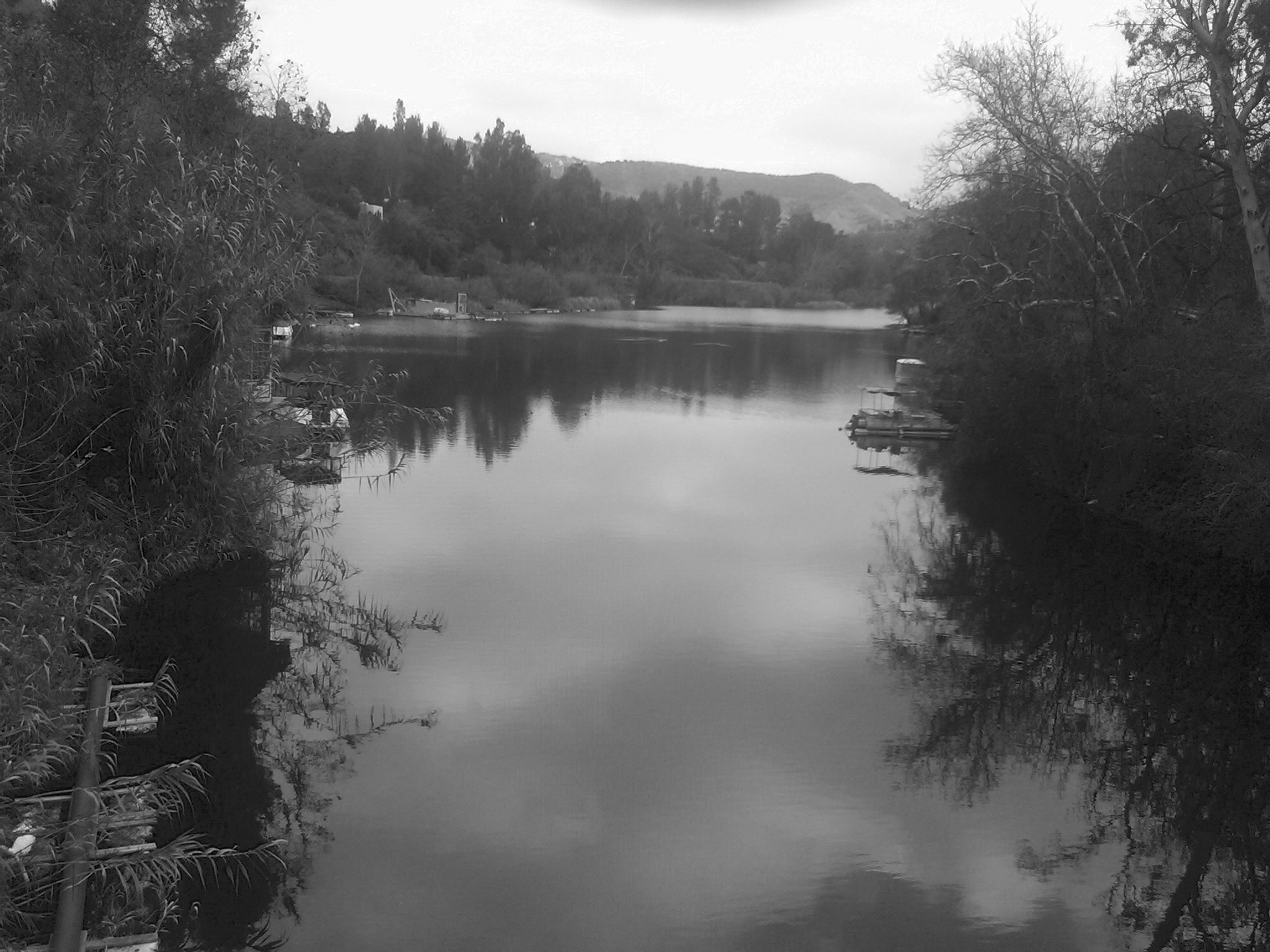
A scene from Frankenstein was filmed near this Malibou Lake location

Malibou Lake has been used as a location or setting for many films and television programs. This location is within the thirty miles (48 km) studio zone and has been a popular location since the silent movie era for films. The lake was used in the 1931 version of Frankenstein, Frankenstein's monster accidentally drowns a little girl, Maria, in a lake in the Bavarian Alps in Europe. Other Hollywood movies include The Ring, a 2002 American psychological horror film, and the 1956 Oscar-nominated film The Bad Seed. Two actresses who shot movies at Malibou Lake were Claudette Colbert in The Man from Yesterday and Betty Grable in Thrill of a Lifetime. The heroes of the film Butch Cassidy and the Sundance Kid jumped from the top of a cliff into the lake. A similar stunt act of jumping into the lake was performed by James Coburn for the film Our Man Flint. Other notable films and programs include:

- (1933) Tillie and Gus with WC Fields
- (1934) Home On the Range
- (1936) Phantom Patrol
- (1936) The Trail of the Lonesome Pine
- (1937) Quality Street
- (1937) Make a Wish
- (1938) Three Men in a Tub (Our Gang short)
- (1938) The Adventures of Tom Sawyer
- (1939) Gone with the Wind
- (1940) The Great Dictator
- (1941) Under Fiesta Stars
- (1942) Watch on the Rhine
- (1946) The Postman Always Rings Twice
- (1947) Saddle Pals
- (1958) I Married a Monster from Outer Space
- (1961) Return to Peyton Place
- (1965) Funny About Love
- (1965) How to Stuff a Wild Bikini
- (1970) M*A*S*H
- (1974) Young Frankenstein
- (1975) Crazy Mama
- (1976) Rich Man, Poor Man
- (1990) Twin Peaks
- (1999) The Story of Us
- (2002) The Ring
- (2005) Must Love Dogs
- (2007) The Office
- (2009) The Black Waters of Echo's Pond

Malibou Lake holds more than 100 film credits.

== Notable people ==
- Arthur Edeson, American film cinematographer
- Elizabeth Montgomery, American film and television actress
- Ronald Reagan, President of the United States, owned a large ranch nearby, which is now a State Park. In 1953 he was named the honorary mayor.
- Robert Hays, actor

== See also ==
- List of lakes in California
- Rindge Dam
- Sherwood Dam
