= Malibu Creek State Park =

Wilderness park in Santa Monica Mountains of southern California

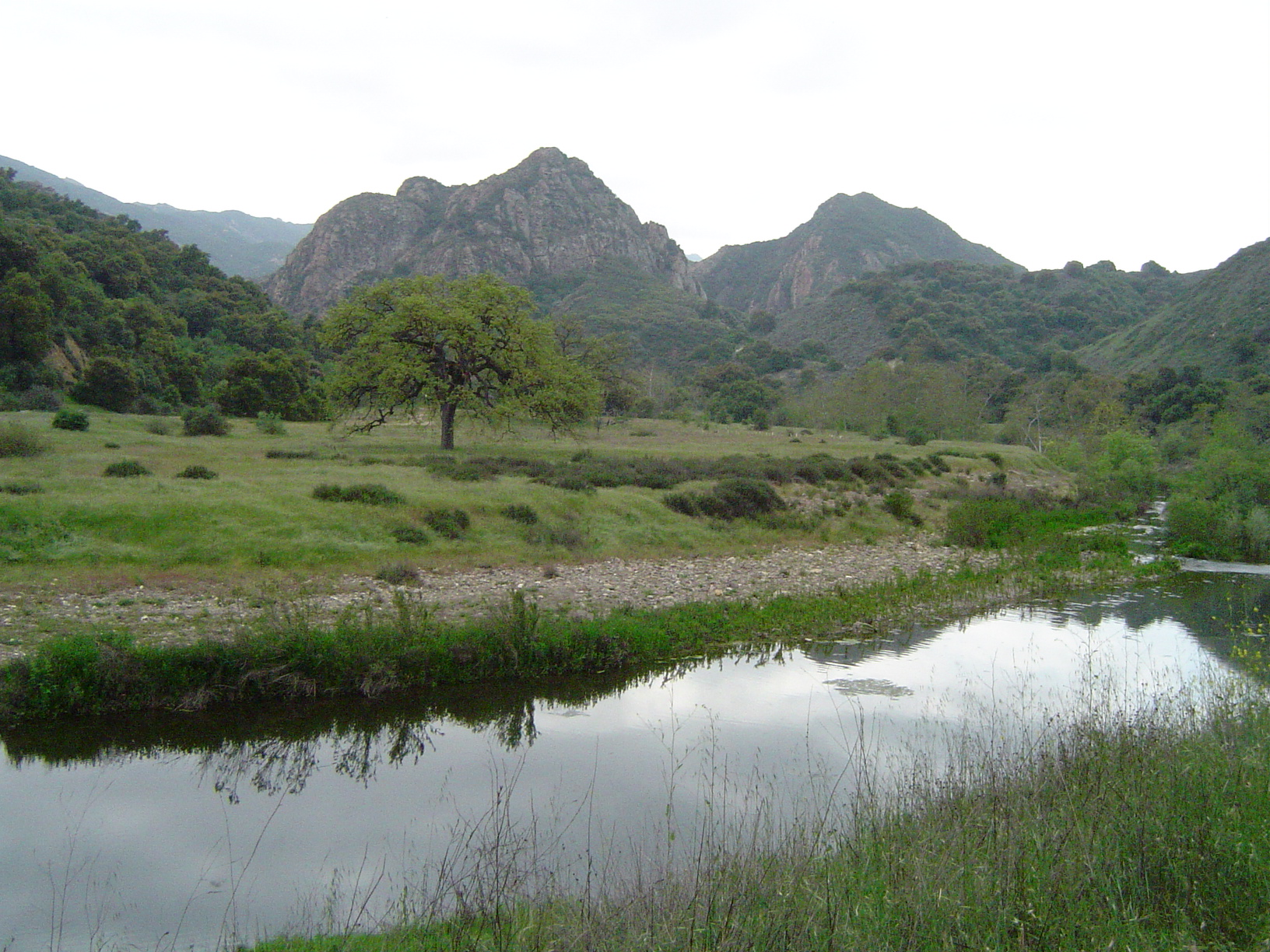
- Malibu Creek State Park, with the Goat Buttes in the background

- Location within California Location within the United States
- Location: Los Angeles County, California, United States
- Nearest city: Calabasas, California
- Coordinates: landmark 34°6′3″N 118°42′40″W
- Area: 8,215 acres (33.24 km^{2})
- Established: 1974
- Governing body: California Department of Parks and Recreation

Malibu Creek State Park is a state park of California, United States, preserving the Malibu Creek canyon in the Santa Monica Mountains. The 8,215-acre (3,324 ha) park was established in 1974. Opened to the public in 1976, the park is also a component of Santa Monica Mountains National Recreation Area. The site of a village called Talepop has been uncovered by archaeologists in the northeast corner of the park. The Chumash were most famous for their wood plank canoes, which they used to travel the coastline for hundreds of miles.

== Geography ==
Malibu Creek State Park stretches from below Malibou Lake in the west to Piuma Road in the east. It follows the creek down to the Pacific Ocean and includes the Adamson House and creek's mouth in the Malibu Lagoon at the beach. Tapia Park was incorporated as a subunit of the park. The park includes three natural preserves: 730-acre (300 ha) Liberty Canyon, 300-acre (120 ha) Udell Gorge, and 1,920-acre (780 ha) Kaslow Preserve.

== Geology ==
The Santa Monica Mountains formed ten million years ago. Faults thrust it out of the ocean in an east-west transverse range. Volcanic activity created the crags that are seen along the south side of Malibu Creek. The Conejo Volcanics formed Goat Buttes and Brent’s Mountain.

== History ==
The land that is now Malibu Creek State Park was inhabited by native Chumash people for millennia. The Chumash have a long history in the Calabasas and Malibu area that goes back thousands of years. Some of the earliest accounts of their encounter with Spanish expeditions in the 18th century are recorded by Miguel Costanso. Their presence has been traced back to 2500 BC with some records on artifacts excavated in the area pointing to 7,000 BC.

Contemporary anthropologists and historical anthropologists like Alfred Kroeber theorize that the Chumash may have had contact with Pacific Islanders due to the Chumash’s use and production of the tomol. While the likeliness of this technology being created locally has been acknowledged, it has been speculated to be inspired by Polynesians due to the similarities between both culture’s maritime tools such as the harpoon, canoe, round shell fishhooks, etc. Additionally, these maritime tools were also present among the populations that resided on the Coast of Chile and Pacific Islanders. This technology was vital in Chumash society due to its ability to carry loads over long distances which would permit navigation on the pacific.

In 1900 a group of wealthy Los Angeles businessmen created the Crags Country Club and purchased 2,000 acres (800 ha) along Malibu Creek. In 1903 the 50-foot-high (15 m) Century Dam was built nearby, creating a 7-acre (2.8 ha) lake that was later purchased by 20th Century Fox and named Century Lake. The three-level, 7,500-square-foot (700 m^{2}) Crags Club Lodge was completed in 1910. Redwood trees were planted near the lake that same year. Also within park boundaries is the Rindge Dam in Malibu Canyon, built in 1926. The Crags Country Club ceased operations in 1936 and the lodge was torn down in 1955.

The majority of the park's lands were donated by entertainer Bob Hope. Other parts of the park, added later, were previously owned by Paramount Pictures and 20th Century Fox for movie ranches. Part of the former 20th Century Fox Ranch had been purchased in 1966 from Ronald Reagan. The Reagan ranch, known as "Yearling Row", was owned by the future president from 1951 to 1966 (Reagan earlier owned another ranch also called Yearling Row in Northridge, California). It was sold by the Reagans to pay campaign debts from the 1966 California governor's campaign. Additional parcels have been connected by the Santa Monica Mountains Conservancy and Santa Monica Mountains National Recreation Area.

In 2014, adjacent Cameron Nature Preserve in Puerco Canyon was acquired by the Santa Monica Mountains Recreation and Conservation Authority. This created a contiguous block of public parkland from this park to Corral Canyon Park and will provide a path for the Coastal Slope Trail. The 703-acre property (284 ha) was purchased from Oscar-winning director James Cameron.

In 2018 substantial portions of the park, including the Reagan ranch and the Fox Ranch location for many films and television shows, were burned and destroyed by the Woolsey Fire. The 2018 Woolsey Fire was one of the most significant recent events affecting Malibu Creek State Park. The fire burned most of the park, with the western end suffering the greatest damage, destroyed the remaining Reagan Ranch barn and structures. This event highlights the ongoing environmental issues facing the park, including hazardous state of most of its historic structures, ecosystems, and public services.

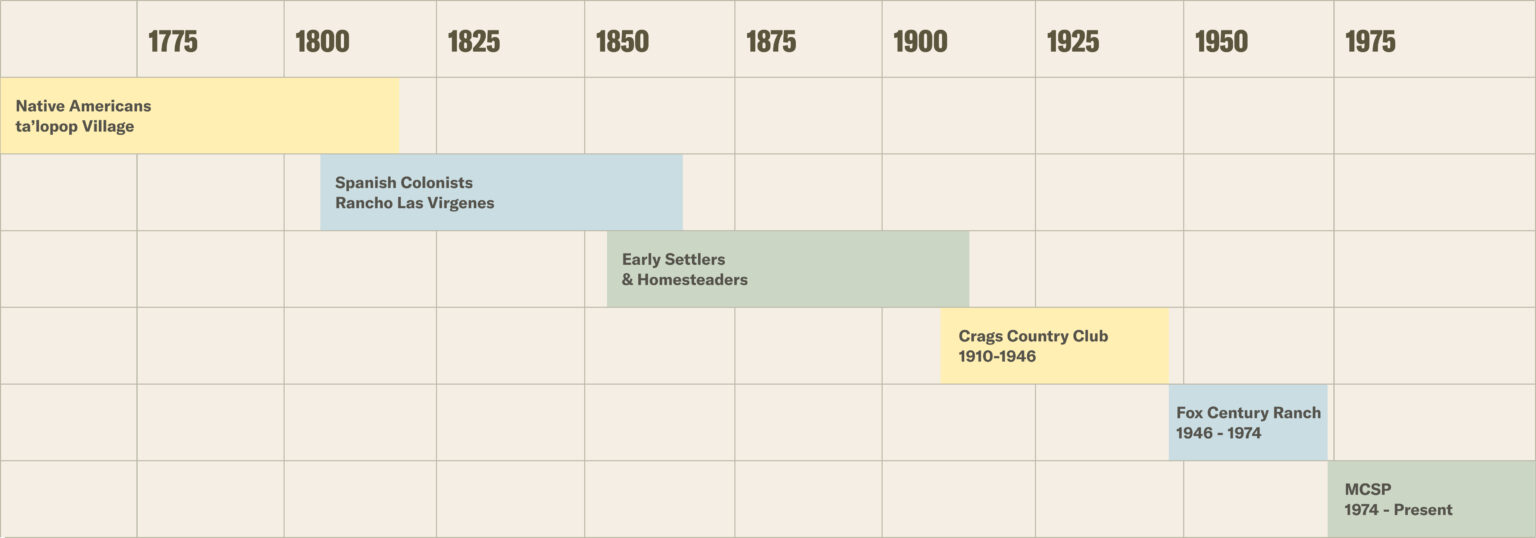
Timeline of Occupancy in Malibu Creek State Park.

== Landmarks ==
=== King Gillette Ranch ===
Most recently an area was annexed to the park known as the King Gillette Ranch, with a landmark Spanish Colonial Revival style residence and estate buildings designed by renowned architect Wallace Neff in the 1920s for owner King C. Gillette, the early-20th-century inventor and manufacturer of the Gillette disposable razor. It was later used by the Catholic Claretian Order as Claretville in the 1950s–60s, then by several other spiritual groups, and finally by Soka University in the 1990s until the recent purchase for the park. The new visitor center for the Santa Monica Mountains National Recreation Area is located here in the historic Stables compound.

=== Sepúlveda Adobe ===
The Sepúlveda Adobe, a 19th-century ranch house, was built by the Sepúlveda family of California, a prominent Californio family of Southern California, is located within the park. Built in 1863 on the early Spanish land grant Rancho Topanga Malibu Simi Sequi, the adobe is one of the oldest surviving structures connected to the area’s settlement history. Chumash laborers helped make the adobe bricks used in its construction, linking the site to both Native and early Californio histories.

Once the site of field trips and weekend events at the State Park, the adobe’s foundations were weakened after the 1994 Northridge earthquake. It became unsafe to enter the building. Efforts were made in 2006 to restore the adobe. Before the restoration was completed, the adobe was mostly destroyed in 2018 by the Woolsey Fire, which also destroyed over 96,000 acres in the Las Virgenes Valley and surrounding area.

The Sepulveda Adobe was home to Pedro and Maria Sepulveda and their 12 children. Pedro and his oldest son, Henry, lived in the adobe until its sale to Gustav Klemen in 1898. After improving the orchards and vineyards surrounding the adobe, Klemen later sold it to Joseph Hunter, the husband of Pedro’s youngest daughter.

Initially, the Sepulveda Adobe was a two-room structure with a sala (living room) and bedroom, and a porch wrapping around its perimeter. The walls were made of sun-dried adobe bricks, plastered with adobe and then painted over with lime. According to oral histories, there was a front door and four windows in the initial structure. The building was later expanded to 10 rooms of varying sizes.

Archaeological investigations in 2001–2003 found evidence of a 19th-century rainwater cistern and a 20th-century tank house to draw water from the ground. The foundation of two adjacent buildings were discovered nearby; archaeologists proposed that it was a 20th-century garage and shop. Nearby excavations revealed a barn, corral, blacksmith shop, barn, outhouse, and two sheds, and the original site of the 1859 adobe.

Most household artifacts found on site were from the 20th century occupation, with the exception of a button and a few cut nails that date to the original Sepulveda occupation in the 19th century. According to former State Parks archaeologist, Michael P. Sampson, this is due to the family’s lower economic status. Common to other rural homesteads in the area, the Sepulveda family did not participate in the rise of consumerism in the 1880s and used long-lasting, locally-made household objects. Further archaeological examination found evidence of Chumash occupation of the site before the Sepulvedas.

== Malibu Creek State Park Archaeology ==
In 1961 and 1963, archaeological excavations took place in Century Ranch on land that was then owned by Twentieth Century-Fox Film Corporation but is now a part of Malibu Creek State Park. The excavations were conducted by UCLA student volunteers under the direction of Jane Harbinger and Santa Monica City College under Chester King and Thomas Blackburn. These excavations revealed Chumash remains consisting of 13 individuals discovered in burials and middens consisting of 9 adults (2 are possible male), an infant, and one individual whose sex and age are not determined. Along with the human remains were 60 funerary objects, 10 flaked stone tools, 20 ground stone artifacts, 12 cobble artifacts, and 4 unmodified faunal bone pieces.

Additionally, in 1960 and 1961, archeological excavations also took place in Century Ranch on land that was then owned Twentieth Century-Fox Film Corporation but is now part of Malibu Creek State Park. These excavations were led by Thomas Blackburn and Ernest Chandonet along with UCLA archaeology students. These excavations revealed a number of burials consisting of 53 individuals that were identified to be 23 adults, 1-sub adult, 13 juveniles, 15 infants, and 1 too damaged to confirm sex or age. Over 821 associated funerary objects were discovered including 678 shell beads, 19 shell pendants, 7 worked bone artifacts, 7 flaked-stone artifacts, 3 ground stone artifacts, 91 asphaltum fragments with basketry impressions, 7 shell dishes, one ochre fragment, and 8 unmodified shell fragments. The site was estimated to be prehistoric with a radiocarbon of circa A.D. 1530. This collection was accessioned in 1961 by UCLA.

== Films shot at the Fox Ranch ==
When owned by 20th Century Fox, the park was known as the Fox Ranch, which was a remote backlot for their movie productions for decades. The park was a key filming location for the film M*A*S*H (1970) and the subsequent television series (1972–83). The landscape was particularly seen in the opening credits for the show as helicopters carrying wounded approach the hospital with the recognizable Goat Buttes in the background.

Other television programs that used the park to pass for a post-apocalyptic Earth were Planet of the Apes and the children's program Ark II. This was also a location for Robin Hood: Men in Tights where the Goat Buttes are seen in the background of the final wedding scene. While the park continues to be used for occasional filming, it has been a location in dozens of films, beginning with a number of Tarzan movies:

- Tarzan Escapes (1936), Tarzan's Revenge (1938), Tarzan Finds a Son! (1939)
- Blockade (1938)
- Full Confession (1939)
- How Green Was My Valley (1941)
- My Friend Flicka (1943)
- Lifeboat (1944)
- Mr. Blandings Builds His Dream House (1948)
- Viva Zapata! (1952)
- Between Heaven and Hell (1956)
- The Defiant Ones (1958)
- The Second Time Around (1961)
- Posse from Hell (1961)
- The Sand Pebbles (1966)
- Doctor Dolittle (1967)
- Planet of the Apes (1968), Beneath the Planet of the Apes (1970), Battle for the Planet of the Apes (1973)
- Butch Cassidy and the Sundance Kid (1969) - stunt scene of Butch and Sundance jumping from a cliff into Century Lake.
- M*A*S*H (1970)
- Tora! Tora! Tora! (1970) - concreted lake bed on the ranch was filled with water, and a miniature Ford Island and "Battleship Row" were constructed for the Pearl Harbor Attack scenes.
- M*A*S*H (television series) (1972 – 1983) - reused sets from 1970 film version. Main set destroyed in October, 1982 wildfire during final season.
- The Poseidon Adventure (1972) - concreted lake bed on the ranch was filled with water, and used for the miniature ship capsizing scenes.
- The Towering Inferno (1974) — concreted lake bed drained, and used for foundation of 70-foot tall miniature exteriors of a fictitious skyscraper.
- Logan's Run (1976) - exterior shots involving wilderness areas and ancient highways.
- Masters of the Universe (1987)
- Tour Of Duty (1987–90)
- Pleasantville (1998)
- The Hunter's Moon (1999)
- Secretary (2002)

== Activities ==
Recreation activities in the park include horseback riding, bird watching, hiking, mountain biking, rock climbing, fishing, and picnicking. Ranger led programs and hikes are also offered.

The Backbone Trail, a multi-use long-distance trail spanning the Santa Monica Mountains, passes through Malibu Creek State Park. Another long distance trail, the Coastal Slope Trail, is under construction and will pass through the remote southern tip of the park.

== See also ==
- List of California state parks
