= Mulholland Highway =

Road in Los Angeles, United States

Coordinates: 34°05′17″N 118°53′44″W

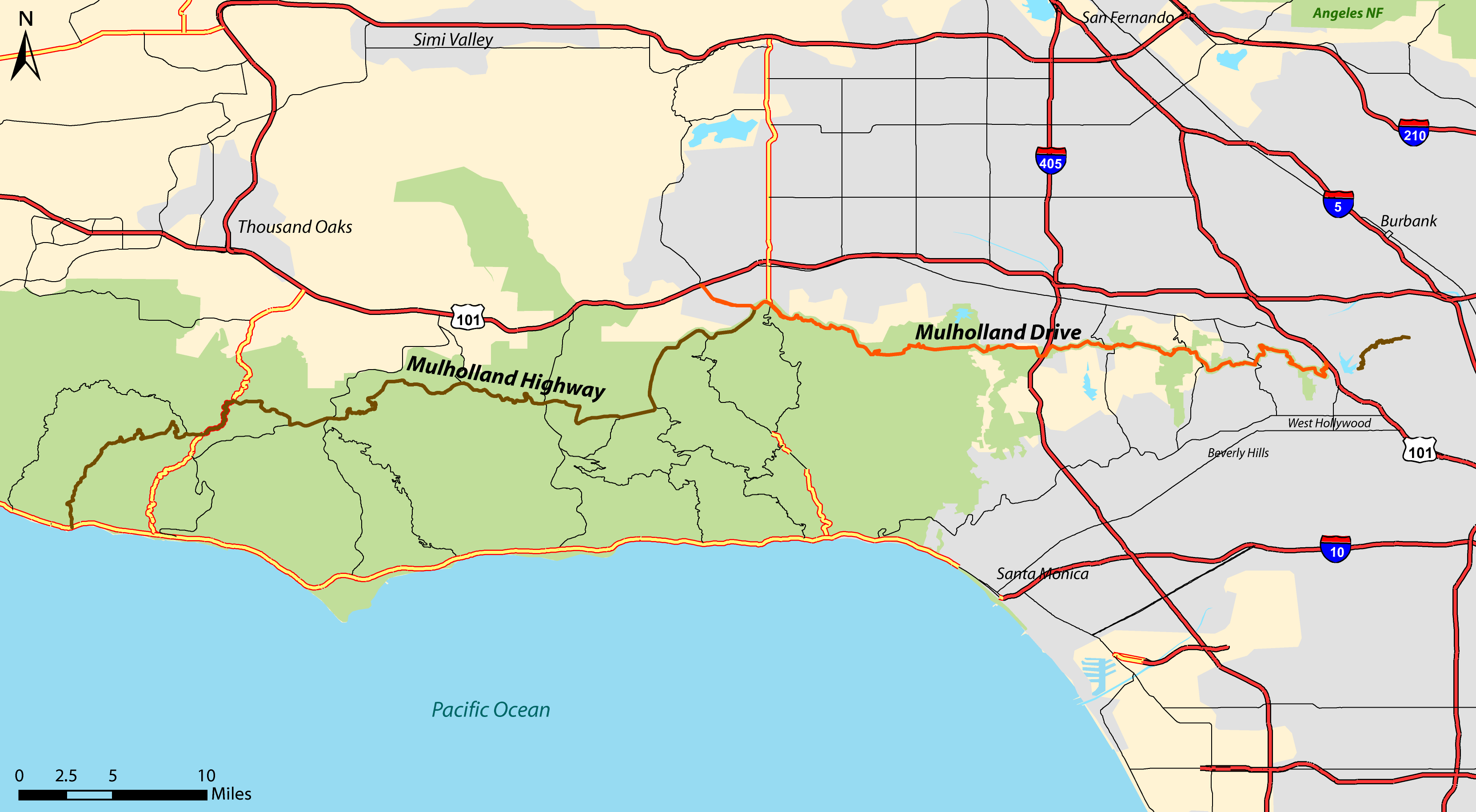
- Map of Mulholland Drive (orange) and Mulholland Highway (brown) in Los Angeles County
- Interactive map of Mulholland Highway
- Namesake: William Mulholland
- Tourist routes: Portions of Mulholland Highway
- West end: SR 1 (Pacific Coast Hwy)
- Major junctions: SR 23 south (Decker Canyon Road); SR 23 north (Westlake Blvd); CR N9 (Kanan Road/Kanan Dume Road): CR N1 (Las Virgenes Road)
- East end: SR 27/Mulholland Drive

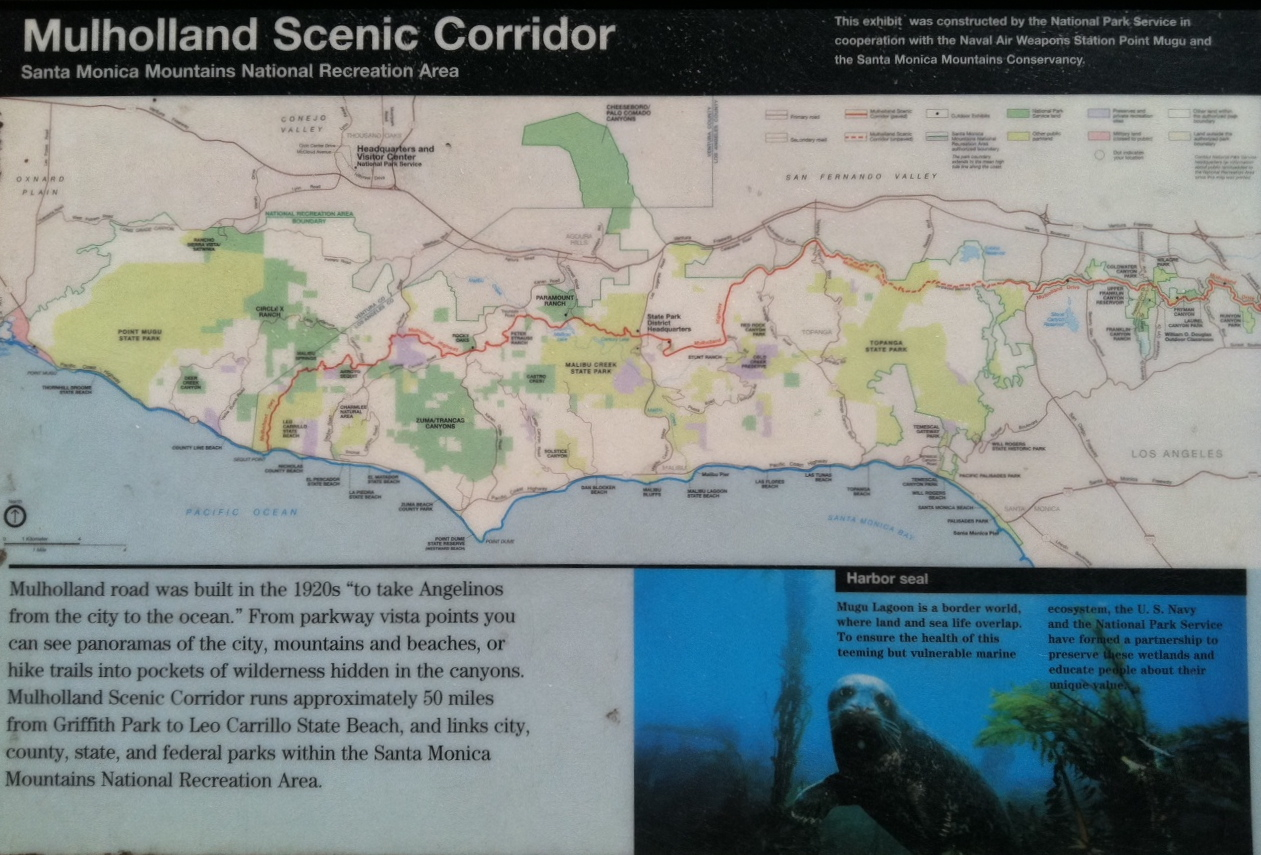
U.S. National Park Service map of Mulholland Highway and Santa Monica Mountains

Mulholland Highway is a scenic road in Los Angeles County, California, that runs approximately 50 miles (80 km) through the western Santa Monica Mountains from near US Route 101 (Ventura Freeway) in Calabasas to Highway 1 (Pacific Coast Highway) near Malibu at Leo Carrillo State Park and the Pacific Ocean coast – at the border of Los Angeles and Ventura Counties.

Mulholland Highway is the western rural portion and, with the eastern Mulholland Drive portion, is a scenic route named after Los Angeles civil engineer William Mulholland and built throughout the 1920s "to take Angelenos from the city to the ocean".

Only the segment of Mulholland Highway between Pacific Coast Highway and Kanan Road/Kanan Dume Road, and through Malibu Creek State Park between Cornell Road and Las Virgenes Road, is officially recognized by the California Department of Transportation as under the California Scenic Highway System, meaning that it is a substantial section of highway passing through a "memorable landscape" with no "visual intrusions", where the potential designation has gained popular favor with the community.

== Geography ==
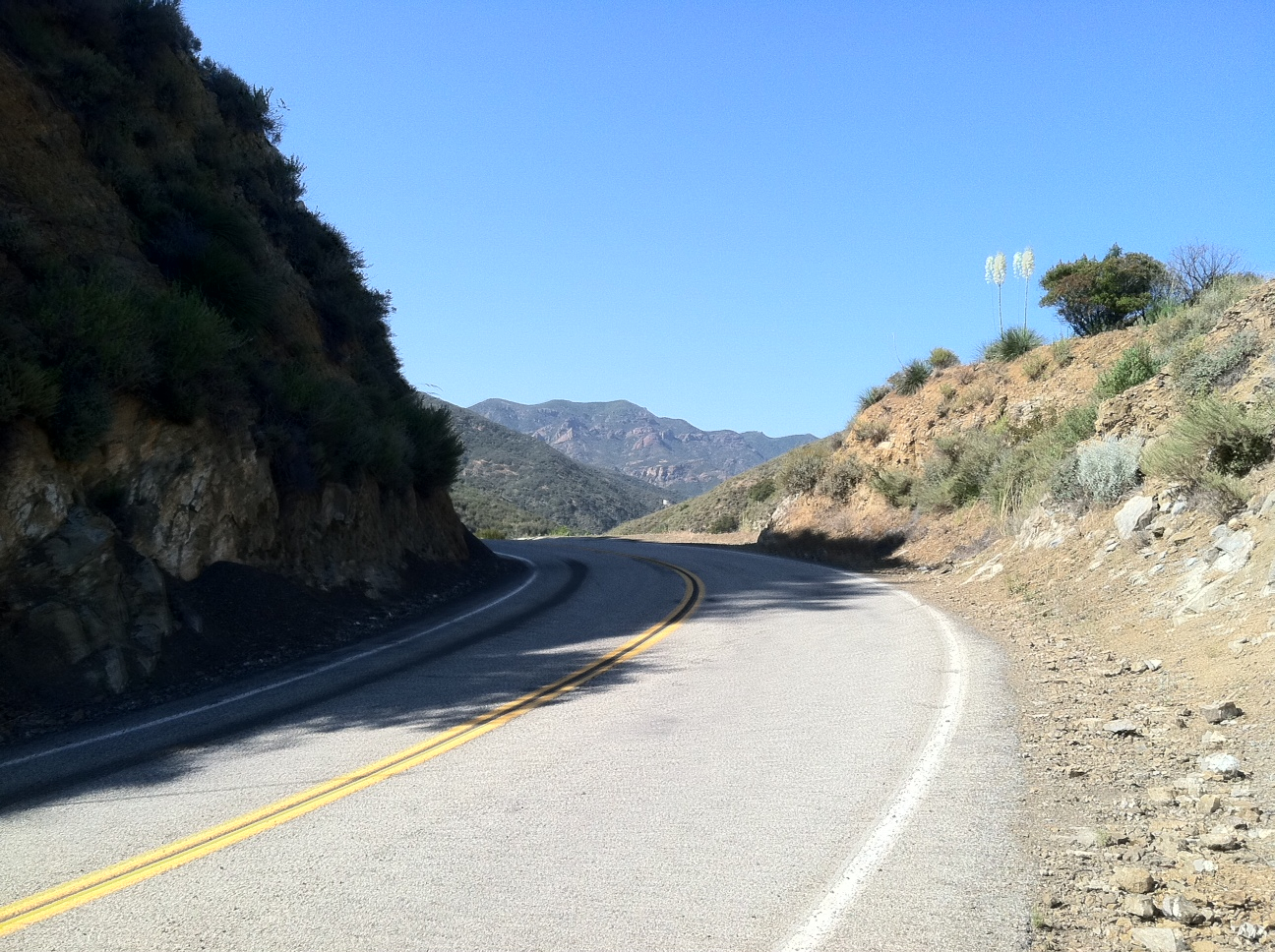
Sandstone Peak as seen from Mulholland Highway

The name Mulholland Highway applies to a 30 miles (50 km) stretch that starts near Louisville High School (California) in Woodland Hills and extends to its westernmost terminus at Leo Carrillo State Park on the Pacific Coast Highway. Wholly contained within Los Angeles County, the scenic byway was formally opened in 1928. Mulholland zigzags through the Santa Monica Mountains – one of the Southern California Transverse Ranges – from Oxnard all the way to Hollywood. Original major intersections included Topanga Canyon Boulevard, Cornell Road, Latigo Canyon Road, Kanan Road/Kanan Dume Road, and Decker Canyon Road.

The route provides access, directly or en route, to many of the regional parks in the Santa Monica Mountains National Recreation Area.

Running east–west along the spine of the Santa Monicas, Mulholland Highway makes its way through the mountains without benefit of tunnels. There are several automobile wrecks and fire-burnt structures that litter the bottoms of the canyons through which Mulholland Highway passes. The native flora of the Santa Monica Mountains are seen throughout the scenic route.

== Hollywoodland ==
East of US 101, there is a section of Mulholland Highway from the Hollywoodland neighborhood to Griffith Park, with views of the Hollywood Sign. Castillo del Lago is located along this stretch, while much of it has been converted to a pedestrian trail called Mulholland Trail.

== See also ==
- Malibu Creek State Park
- The Rock Store
