= Newbury Park, California =

Community in Ventura County, California, United States

- Neighborhood of Thousand Oaks; Unincorporated area (partial)
- Location within the Los Angeles metropolitan area Location within California Location within the United States
- Coordinates: 34°11′03″N 118°54′35″W
- Country: United States
- State: California
- County: Ventura
- Region: Conejo Valley

Area
  - Total: 21.0 sq mi (54 km^{2})
  - Land: 20.5 sq mi (53 km^{2})
  - Water: 0.5 sq mi (1.3 km^{2})
- Highest elevation: 2,828 ft (862 m)
- Lowest elevation: 500 ft (150 m)

Population (2010)
  - Total: 37,775
  - Density: 1,772/sq mi (684/km^{2})
- ZIP Code: 91320
- Area codes: 805/820
- GNIS feature IDs: 2585446

Newbury Park is a populated place in Ventura County, California, United States. Most of it lies within the western Thousand Oaks city limits, while unincorporated areas include Casa Conejo and Ventu Park. The neighborhood is located in Southern California around 8 miles (13 km) from the Pacific Ocean and has a mild year-round climate, scenic mountains, and environmental preservation. About 28,000 residents of Thousand Oaks reside in Newbury Park.

Newbury Park makes up around 40 percent of the total land area of Thousand Oaks. Lying within the Conejo Valley in the northwestern part of the Greater Los Angeles Area, Newbury Park abuts the Santa Monica Mountains. It is approximately 35 miles (56 km) from Downtown Los Angeles and less than 7 mi (11 km) from the Los Angeles County border in Westlake Village. The closest coastal city is neighboring Malibu which may be reached through winding roads, a bike path, or hiking trails crossing the Santa Monica Mountains. It makes up all of ZIP code 91320, and is within area code 805.

== Etymology ==
Timberville was a 19th-century name for Newbury Park. Newbury Park is named after its founder Egbert Starr Newbury, who was also the first postmaster in the Conejo Valley in 1875. Egbert Starr Newbury called his ranch here "Newbury Park", which became the name for the entire town.

Newbury had purchased 2200 acres of a former rancho in the Conejo Valley, but he and his family lived there for only six years. They returned to Michigan in 1877 because he was forced into bankruptcy due to crop and livestock losses after a protracted drought.

The Newbury Park Post Office has operated at numerous sites, but the Newbury Park name has survived, even though much of the area was incorporated into the city of Thousand Oaks.

Newbury had chosen the name "Newbury Park" for the US post office, as he felt the area looked like a park.

== History ==
=== Pre-colonial period ===
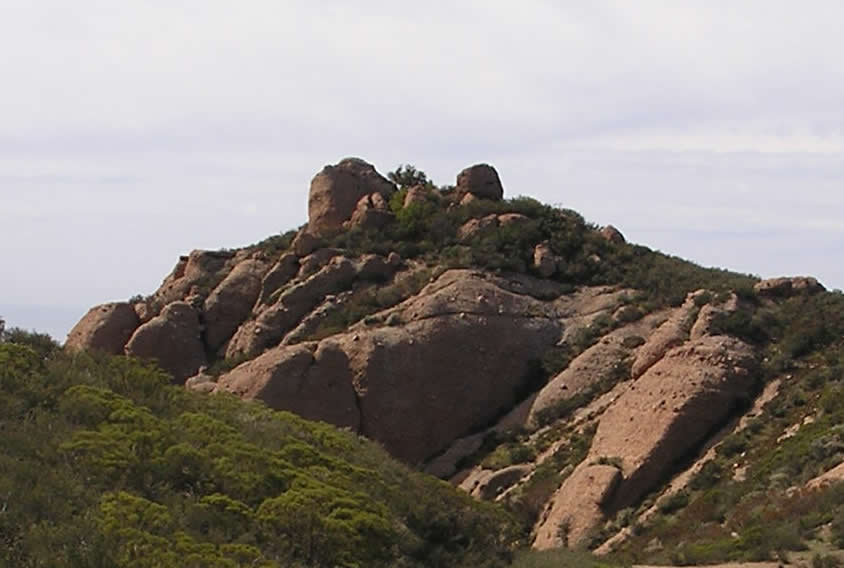
Satwiwa Native American Indian Culture Center is a Chumash habitation site at the foothills of Mount Boney, which is a sacred site for the Chumash.

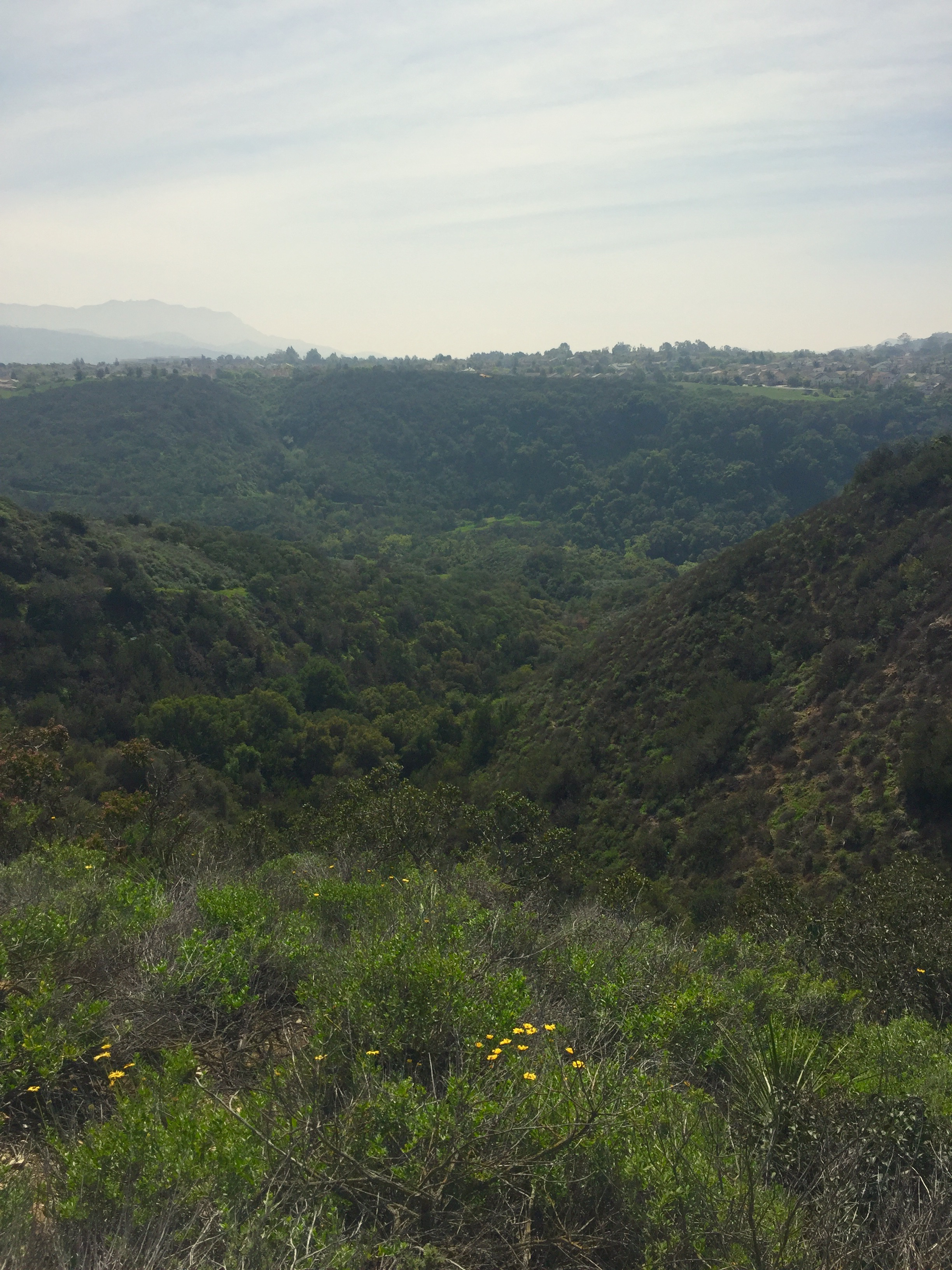
A large Chumash village was located just north of La Branca (Arroyo Conejo Open Space).

Anthropologist John P. Harrington wrote, c. 1900, what he was told by the local Chumash people:

Early one morning in 9080 B.C., the ancestral grandfather from whom I took my name, headed west on one of his most adventurous hunting trips ever... As the group climbed Old Boney, they looked back to the north and could see the pleasant openings of the Conejo and Hidden Valleys. There, there appeared to be good grazing ground for the mammoth herd and they proceeded thence.

This story may be related to the lore about the Paleo-Indians, who are believed by some to be the distant ancestors of the Chumash. Mammoth fossils were unearthed in Newbury Park in 1961 and later in 1971. They are on display at the Stagecoach Inn Museum. The Newbury Park area is believed to have been inhabited by people of the Chumash culture for at least the past 6,000, 7,000, 8,000, or perhaps 10,000 years.

The Newbury Park area was previously the site of three Chumash villages: Satwiwa by the southern edge of town, and two villages located near today's Ventu Park Road. These villages were settled 2,000 years ago, and had a population of 100–200 inhabitants in each village.

In addition, a large Chumash village was located just north of what is now known as Wildwood Regional Park in the Arroyo Conejo Open Space. Other nearby villages include Lalimanux (Lalimanuc or Lalimanuh) at the base of the Conejo Grade by westernmost Newbury Park, and Kayɨwɨš or Kayiwish (Kawyis) (CA-Ven-243), also near the Conejo Grade. This region contains numerous pictographs.

The Newbury Park area contains many ancient burial sites, most near the Santa Monica Mountains in the southern portion of the community. Many burial items have been discovered in the area, most notably by Rancho Sierra Vista in southern Newbury Park. Satwiwa, which is Chumash for "the bluffs", was the name of a nearby village by the Big Sycamore Canyon. The canyon was a popular trading route for the Chumash and Tongva people, connecting the Conejo Valley to Mugu Lagoon through the Santa Monica Mountains.

Satwiwa is now protected as a part of the Santa Monica Mountains National Recreation Area. But the remains of two other Chumash villages are located on private lands by Ventu Park Road. These are known as CA-Ven-65, CA-Ven-261, and CA-Ven-260 near the fieldhouse in Newbury Park. At CA-Ven-261 is an ancient Chumash burial site, which suggests that the village existed here for a considerable time.

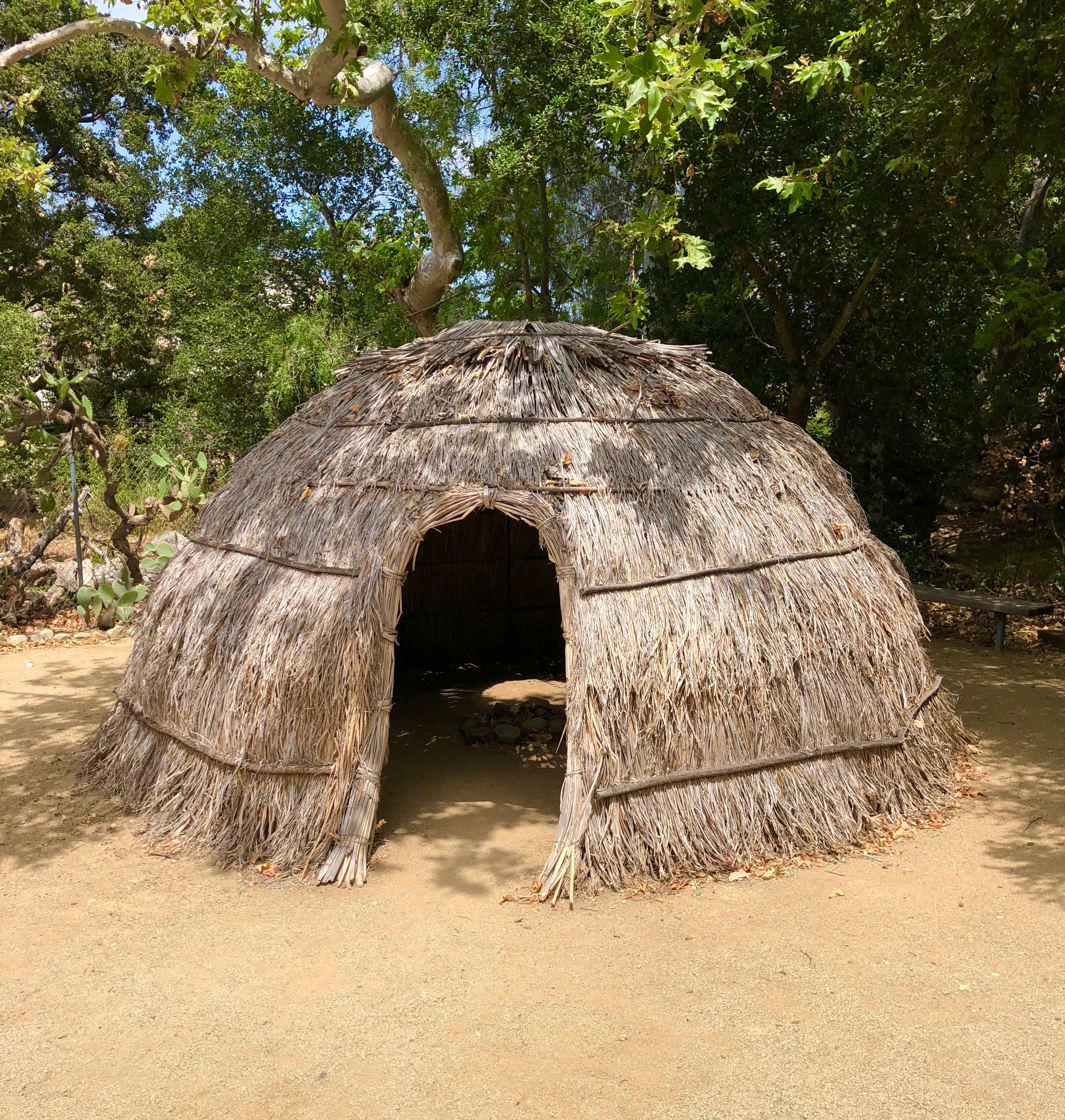
Replica of a Chumash house ('ap) at the Tri-Village Complex at Stagecoach Inn

The Ventureño Chumash initially settled in the west end of the Santa Monica Mountains because of the abundant food supply. Roots, berries, seeds, bulbs, acorns and walnuts were plentiful in the region, and a variety of wildlife including birds, deer and squirrels made for good hunting. Shellfish and fish were transported from the nearby Mugu Lagoon across the Santa Monicas. The abundance of jackrabbits and other rabbit species were hunted widely for fur and meat. At one point, the Chumash here gathered a group of 27 men and killed hundreds of rabbits during a rabbit round-up, which was a significant event of late summers in the Conejo Valley.

Various Chumash artifacts from these older settlements, along with petroglyphs, have been found along the Arroyo Conejo, at Rancho Sierra Vista, and particularly in the Santa Monica Mountains.

The Satwiwa Native American Indian Culture Center and the Stagecoach Inn Museum in Newbury Park have displays based on some of these finds, as does the Chumash Indian Museum in Thousand Oaks.

In partnership with Friends of Satwiwa, in 1978 the National Park Service began talks of developing the current Satwiwa Native American Indian Culture Center and Natural Area. Boney Mountain in southern Newbury Park is identified as a sacred site for the Chumash, and nearby Satwiwa is frequently used by the Chumash Barbareño-Ventureño Band of Mission Indians for private events, such as traditional dances and sacred ceremonies.

=== 19th century ===
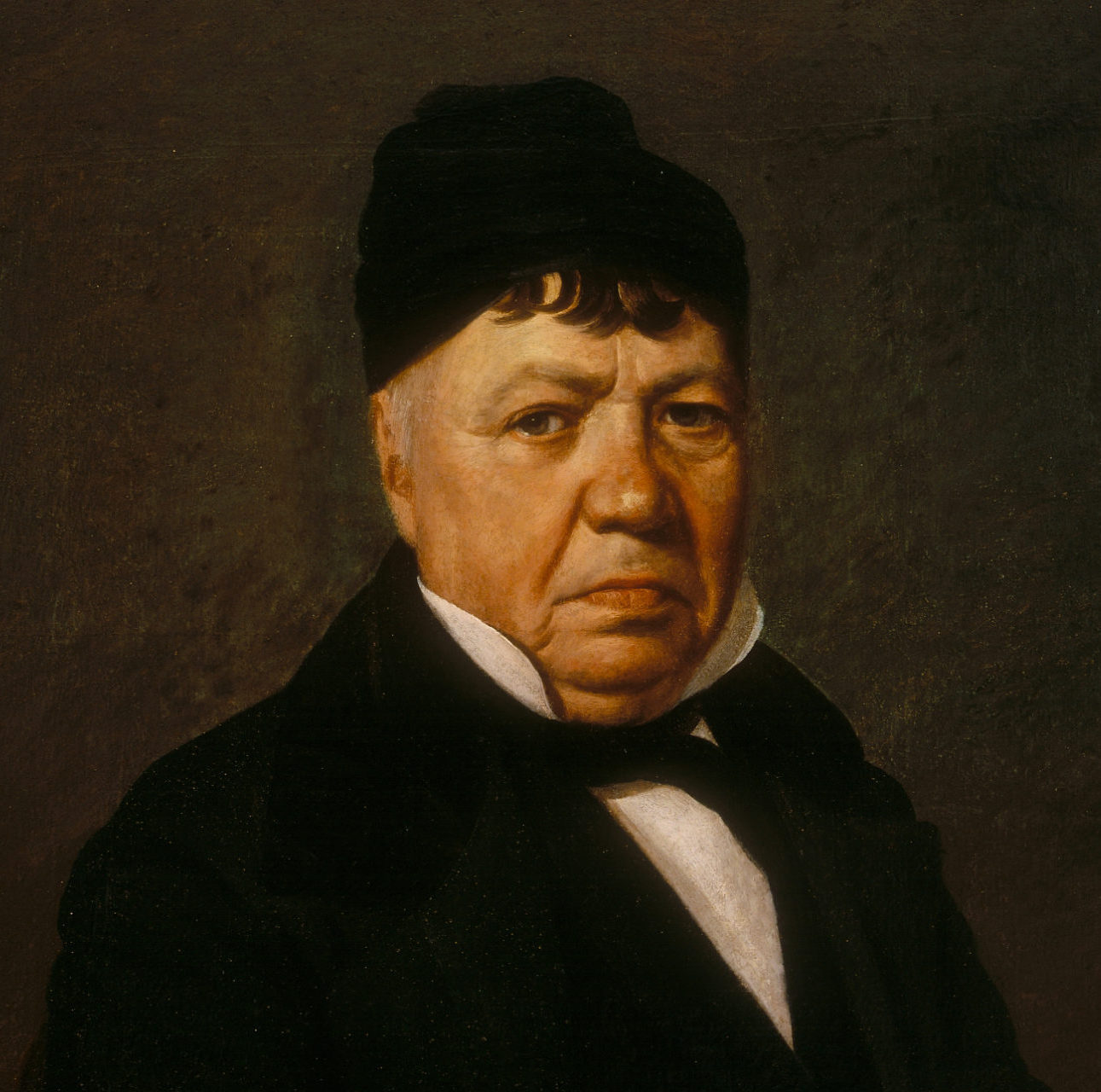
Newbury Park was part of Rancho El Conejo, owned by Don José de la Guerra y Noriega, founder of the prominent Guerra family of California.

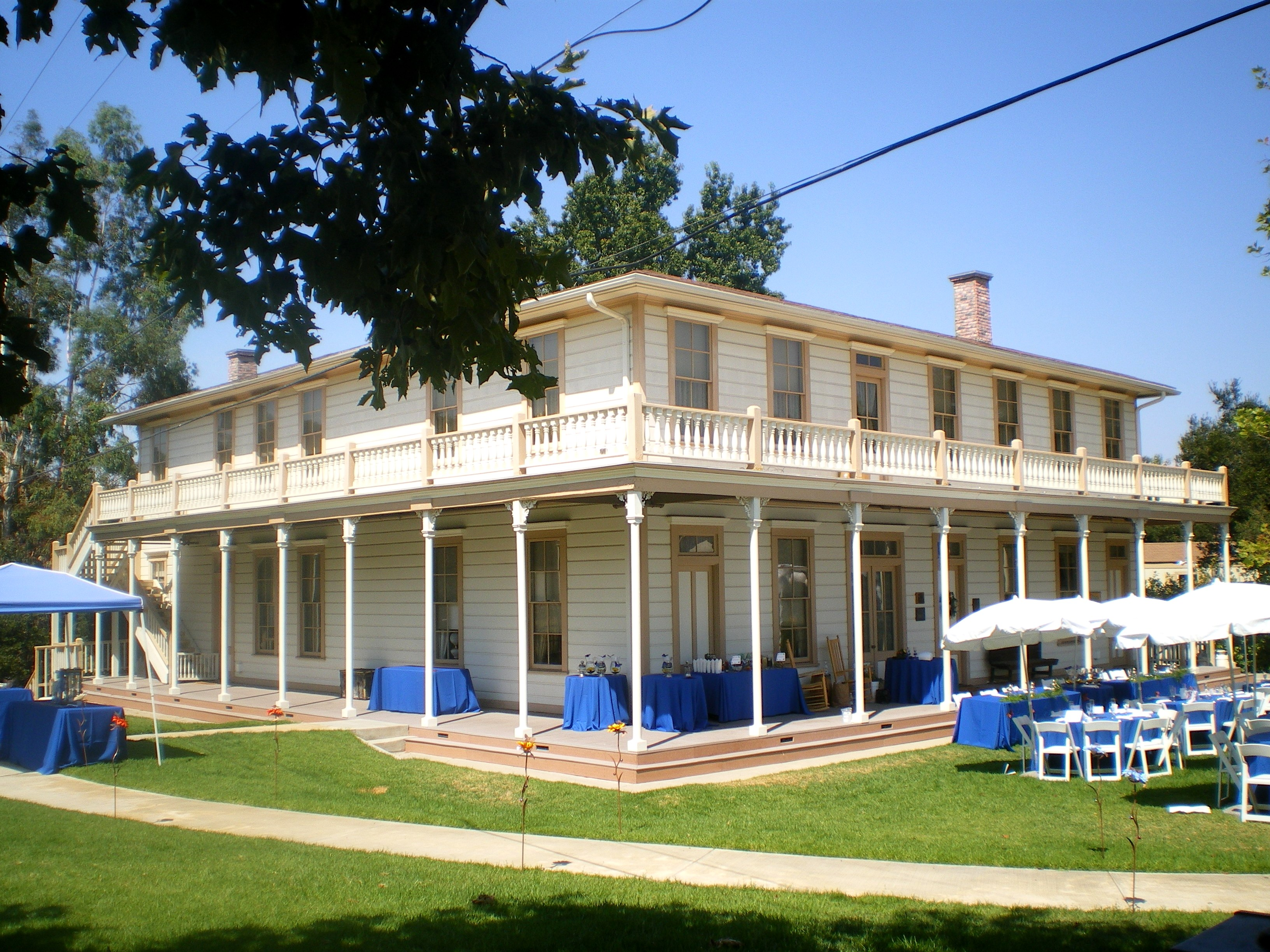
The 1876 Stagecoach Inn was used as a stagecoach hotel for travelers between Los Angeles and Santa Barbara.

When the Europeans first arrived in the Conejo Valley, they pressed plow to furrow and fields to barley and wheat. Newbury Park is named after its founder, Egbert Starr Newbury, who owned thousands of acres of land in the Conejo Valley and later became the first postmaster. E.S. Newbury, Howard Mills, and John Edwards were among the first to buy former Rancho El Conejo land in the early 1870s. El Rancho Conejo was an area which today encompasses most of the Conejo Valley and was named for its many rabbits. Its name derives from a Spanish land grant in California, encouraged by the Spanish- and Mexican governments.

Newbury and his wife Fannie moved to California from Michigan of health reasons in 1871. He later became the first postmaster in the Conejo Valley in 1875. The post office was near their house which was located at the current location of the Thousand Oaks Civic Arts Plaza. E.S. Newbury purchased 2,200 acres of land in 1874, which stretched from today's old town Thousand Oaks and into Hidden Valley in southern Newbury Park.

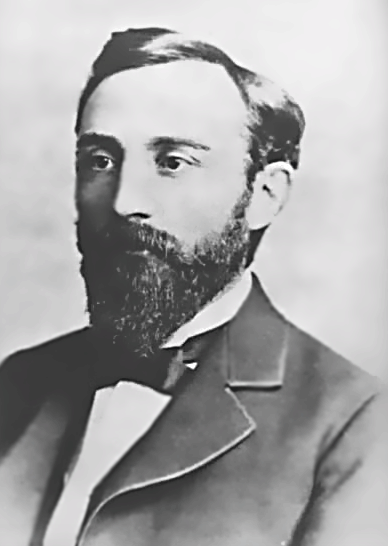
Newbury Park is named for its founder, Egbert Starr Newbury.

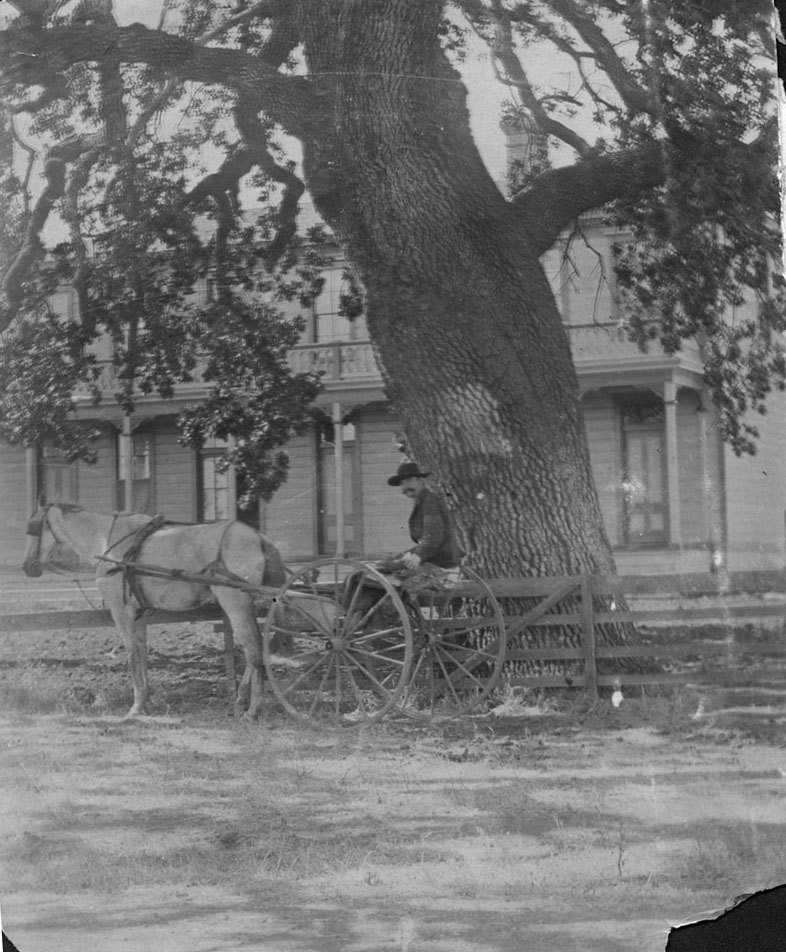
Conejo Hotel at Timberville, 1880s

In the 1870s, Egbert S. Newbury and his wife Fannie moved full-time to their ranch in Conejo Valley which they named "Newbury Park" because the land looked so much like a park community. It consisted of his house, barn, and a guest house for visitors to "enjoy the healthful climate", according to E.S. Newbury. The area was remote and only five families lived in the Conejo Valley at the time, all on large ranch lands. The ranches were miles apart and there were no grocery stores, medical facilities, schools, or churches in the valley. Newbury had acres of wheat and owned thousands of sheep. The weather had a great impact on his health, and he wrote to his sister Kittie in Michigan on November 23, 1874:

"take wings and come to Conejo and enjoy our warm bright days all winter... be outdoors instead of confined indoors... I am out all the time and our drives now are just lovely with the country all turning green. The birds stay around our house in flocks all the time... Our roads to the ranch are splendid and they lie through beautiful canyons and large groves of live and white oak and sycamore, then into an open valley with slopes and surrounding hills covered with evergreen oaks...".

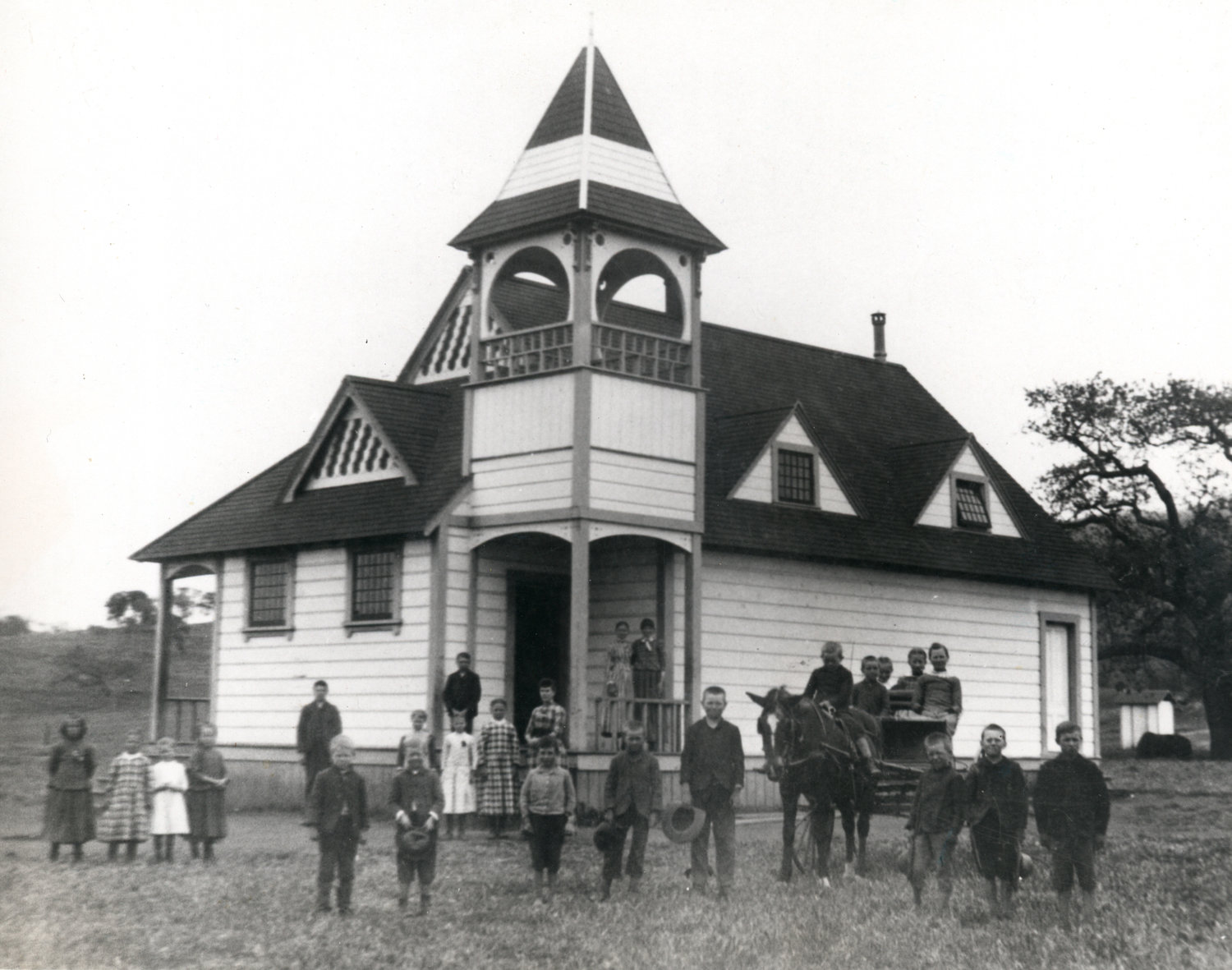
Timber School in the 1890s, Newbury Park's first school

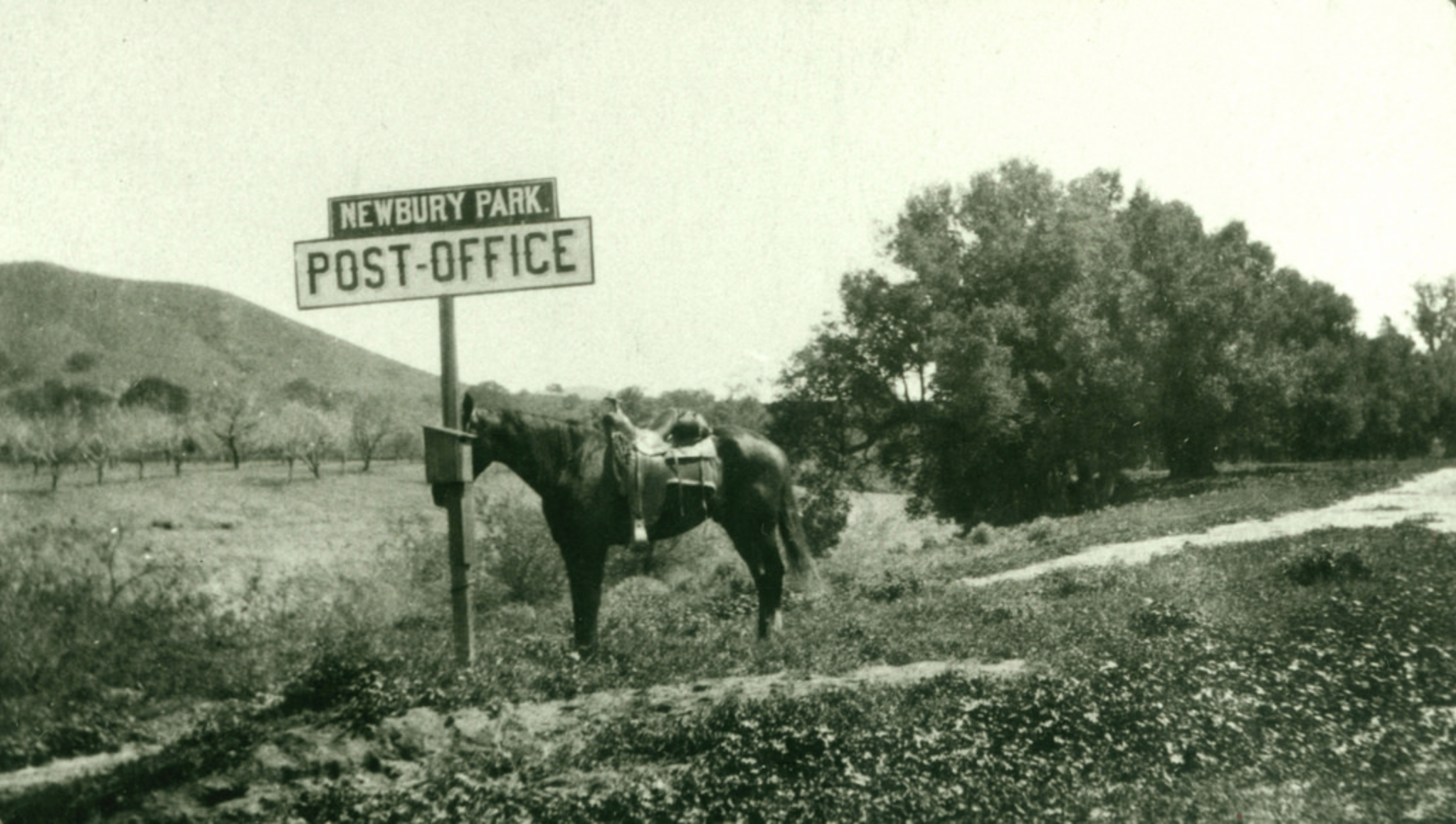
Sign near Newbury Park Post Office, 1909

As a result of the increasing interest in the developing Conejo Valley, Newbury functioned as a public relations representative for the Conejo Valley. On December 25, 1875, E.S. Newbury wrote in the largest newspaper in Ventura County at the time, the Ventura Signal, the following words about Newbury Park:

"Next to Ojai and Santa Ana ranchos, the Conejo mountain valley has the best reputation as a health resort. It is well fifteen miles from Port Hueneme. The soil is immensely fertile, producing large crops of wheat and other grain...".

Before Newbury Park existed, the Grand Union Hotel provided a stopover for travelers that dates back to 1876. The hotel was operated as a health- and pleasure resort, and provided a rest stop for stagecoach passengers and a gathering place for residents in Newbury Park.

The Conejo Valley pioneers were living in rugged individualism, where travelers had to make their journey over the Conejo Grade or Norwegian Grade to reach Camarillo where they could buy groceries. Newbury Park was an older settlement than Thousand Oaks, where people had settled wedged between Borchard lands on the south and Friedrich land on the north. The residents of the Conejo Valley had to travel to Oxnard for high school, burials or for marriages.

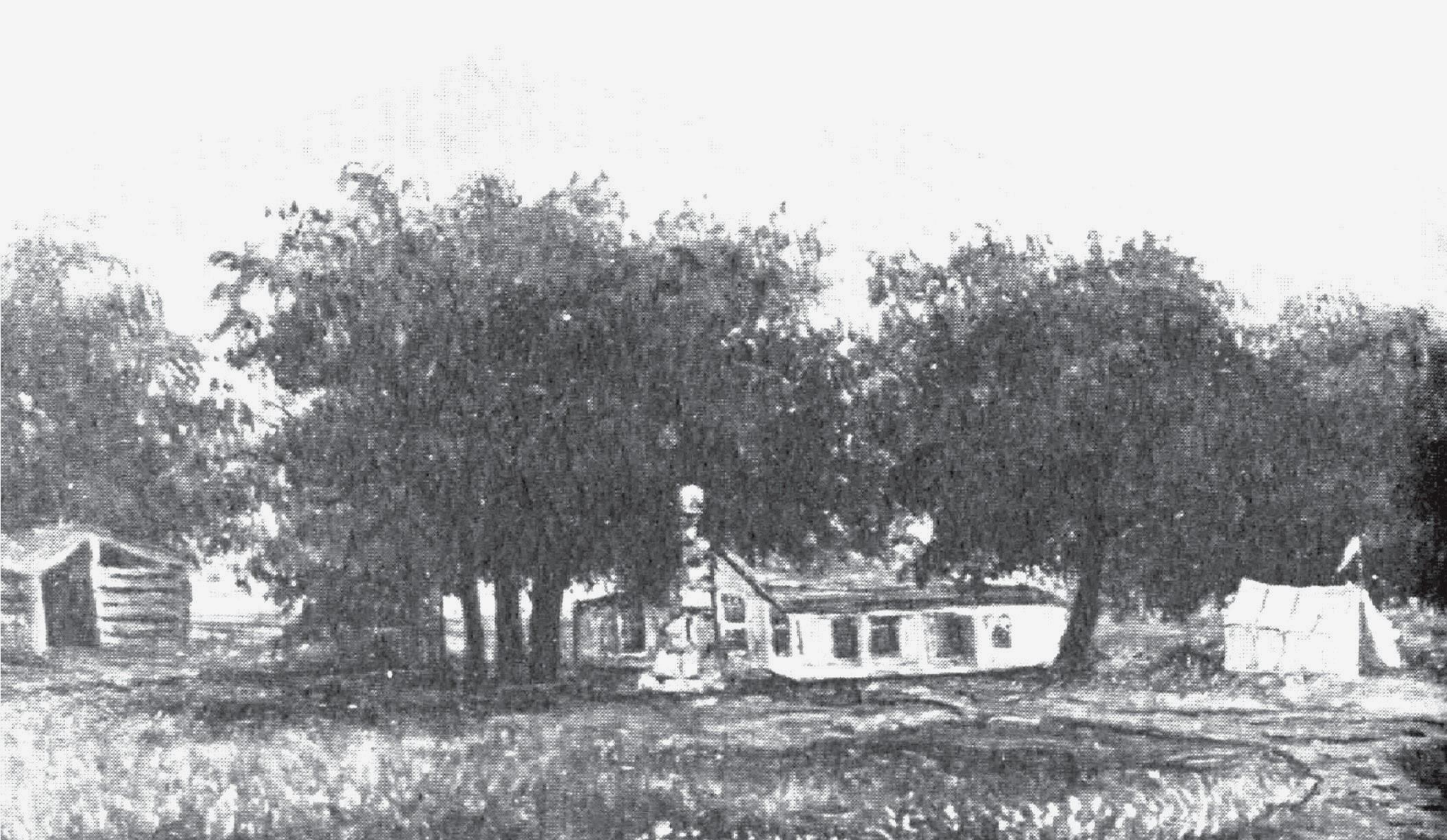
Painting of the Newbury home, 1870s. The tent held Conejo Valley's first Post Office.

As inhabitants of the valley had to travel to San Buenaventura (Ventura, CA) to get their mail, E.S. Newbury took the initiative to establish a local post office and applied to Washington, D.C. On July 16, 1875, the Newbury Park Post Office was established with E.S. Newbury as its first postmaster.

The Conejo School District was established in March 1877. At the time, the population was 126 in the Conejo Valley. E.S. Newbury and other residents of the Conejo Valley were unprepared for the 1876–78 drought. There were only six inches of rain in 30 months. The drought devastated Newbury Park and the valley. With no rain, the crops died and natural grasses as well, which were food for the ranchers' sheep. Egbert went bankrupt and decided to move with his family in 1877, and rode with his wagon and family back to Michigan where he ultimately settled in Detroit. On September 28, 1878, the land Egbert once called "Newbury Park" was sold at a sheriff's sale. The post office remained its original name, despite having moved from its original destination, which is why Newbury Park has its name today.

=== Modern history ===
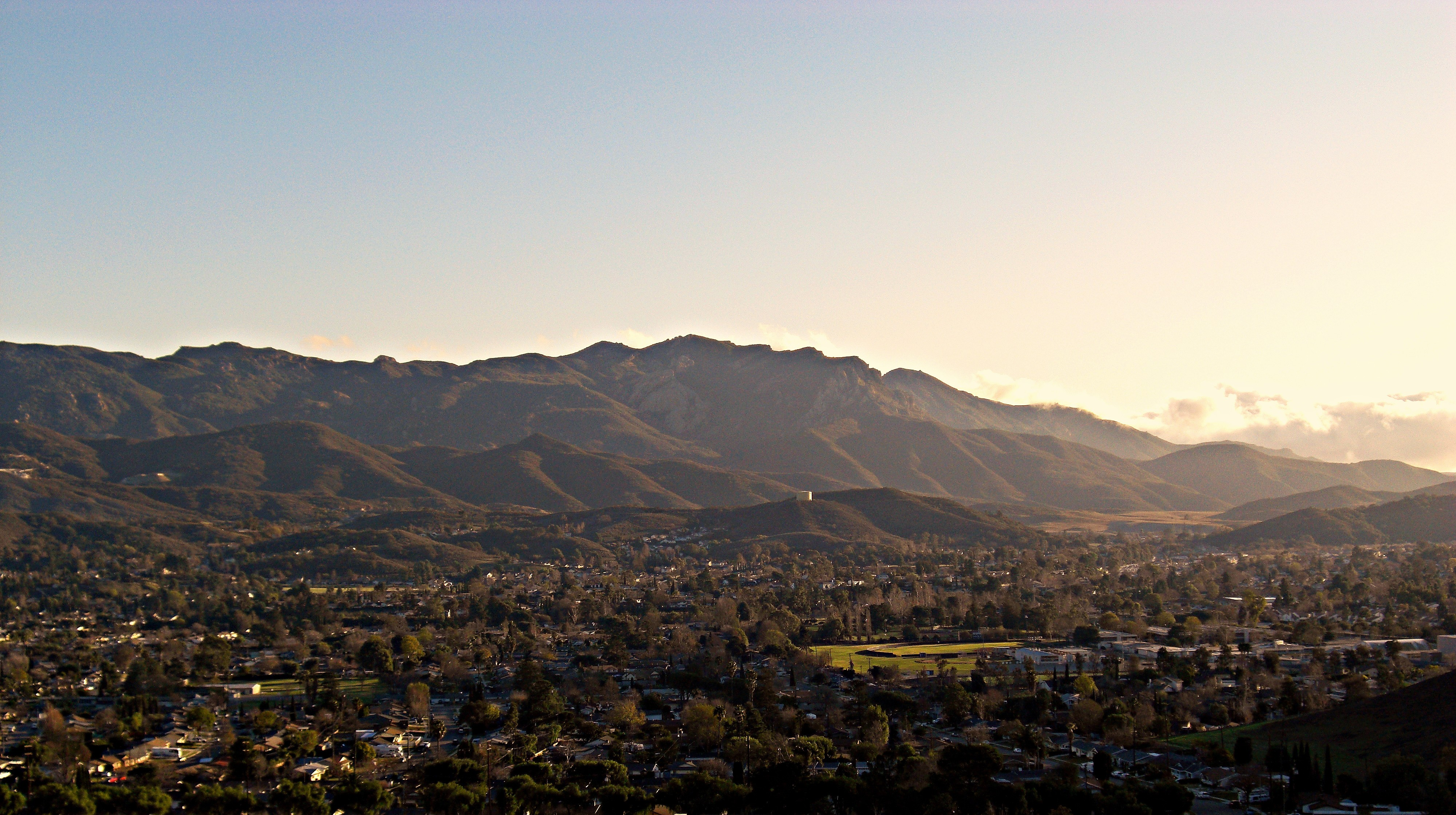
Casa Conejo is the oldest planned development in town. It is an unincorporated county island which is part of Newbury Park, but not Thousand Oaks.

Newbury Park was a more established and older community than Thousand Oaks at the beginning of the 20th century.

In the early 20th century, Newbury Park had a few ranches and stores, wedged between Borchard lands to the south and Friedrich land on the north. During the 1940s, Ventu Park behind Newbury Park's main street became a 500-acre real estate development. Lots sold to movie stars and others seeking a rustic retreat. One of the male members of the New York Rothschilds built a large home by Ventu Park and lived in relative seclusion here in the 1940s.

Prior to the 1960s, Newbury Park was never incorporated as its own city or municipality, it was unincorporated areas of Ventura County with little development. During the 1950s there were speculations persisting that Ventura County officials refused to allow Newbury Park to expand because of a feud with the would-be developers. Between 1950 and 1970, the Conejo Valley experienced a population boom, and increased its population from 3,000 to 30,000.

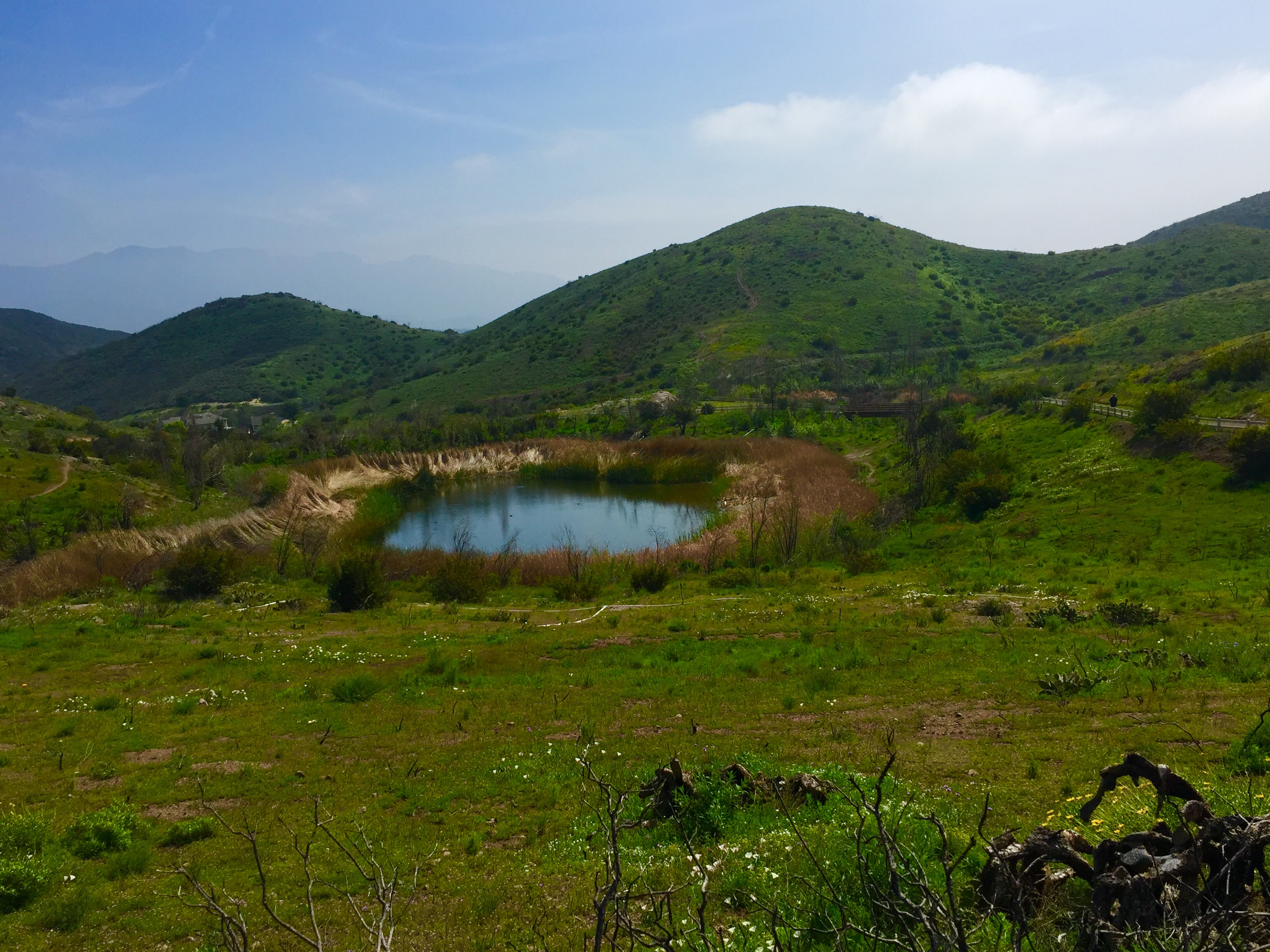
Twin Ponds in Dos Vientos

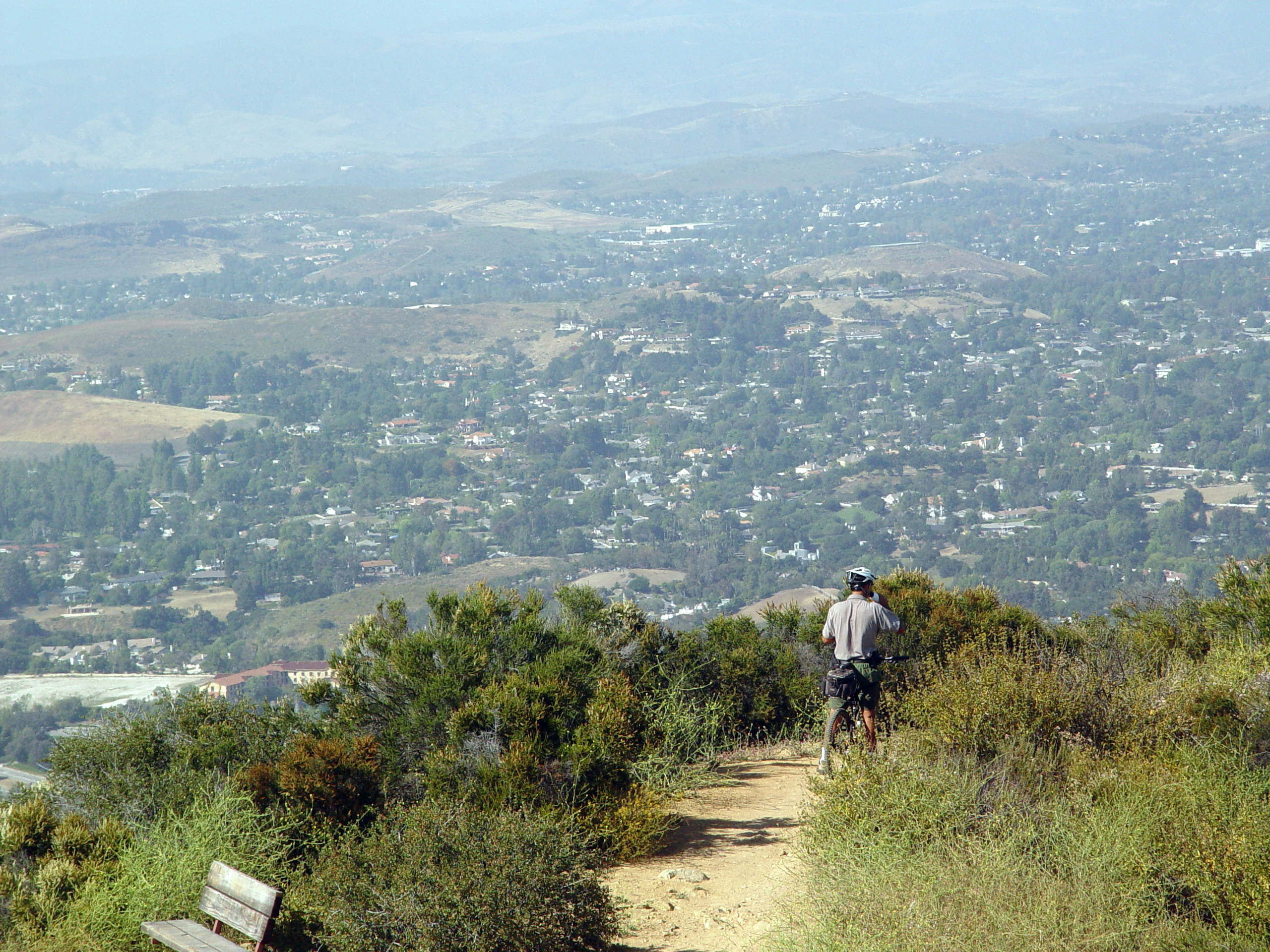
Newbury Park as seen from atop Angel Vista (1,603 ft), reached from the Rosewood Trail

Many Newbury Park residents did not want to be part of Thousand Oaks, and many residents fought to stop the incorporation in fear of losing the Newbury Park identity. Newbury Park had made failed attempts at creating its own municipality in the early 1960s, not only to create its own city, but to also remain independent of Thousand Oaks. A 1963 attempt at a cityhood election failed when the Janss's Rancho Conejo Industrial Park and the Talley Corporation refused to join the efforts. Activist Reba Hays Jeffries of the Stagecoach Inn had a different explanation for interviewers when addressing why efforts at an independent municipality failed. She claimed the cityhood supporters were required to collect signatures from owners who represented 29% of the land area in Newbury Park. As the efforts collected signatures from 29% of registered voters, and not Newbury Park landowners, the petition never appeared on the ballot. Reba M.H. Jeffries was one of several opponents to the idea of annexation when it was first proposed in 1967. Jeffries feared for the identity of Newbury Park and was quoted in an interview saying: "It's a shame that the Thousand Oaks personality is overpowering to the extent that Newbury Park is losing its large ranches and freedom." Jeffries was also opposed to the proposition to demolish the Stagecoach Inn in 1964, and fought to keep the Newbury Park Post Office in town.

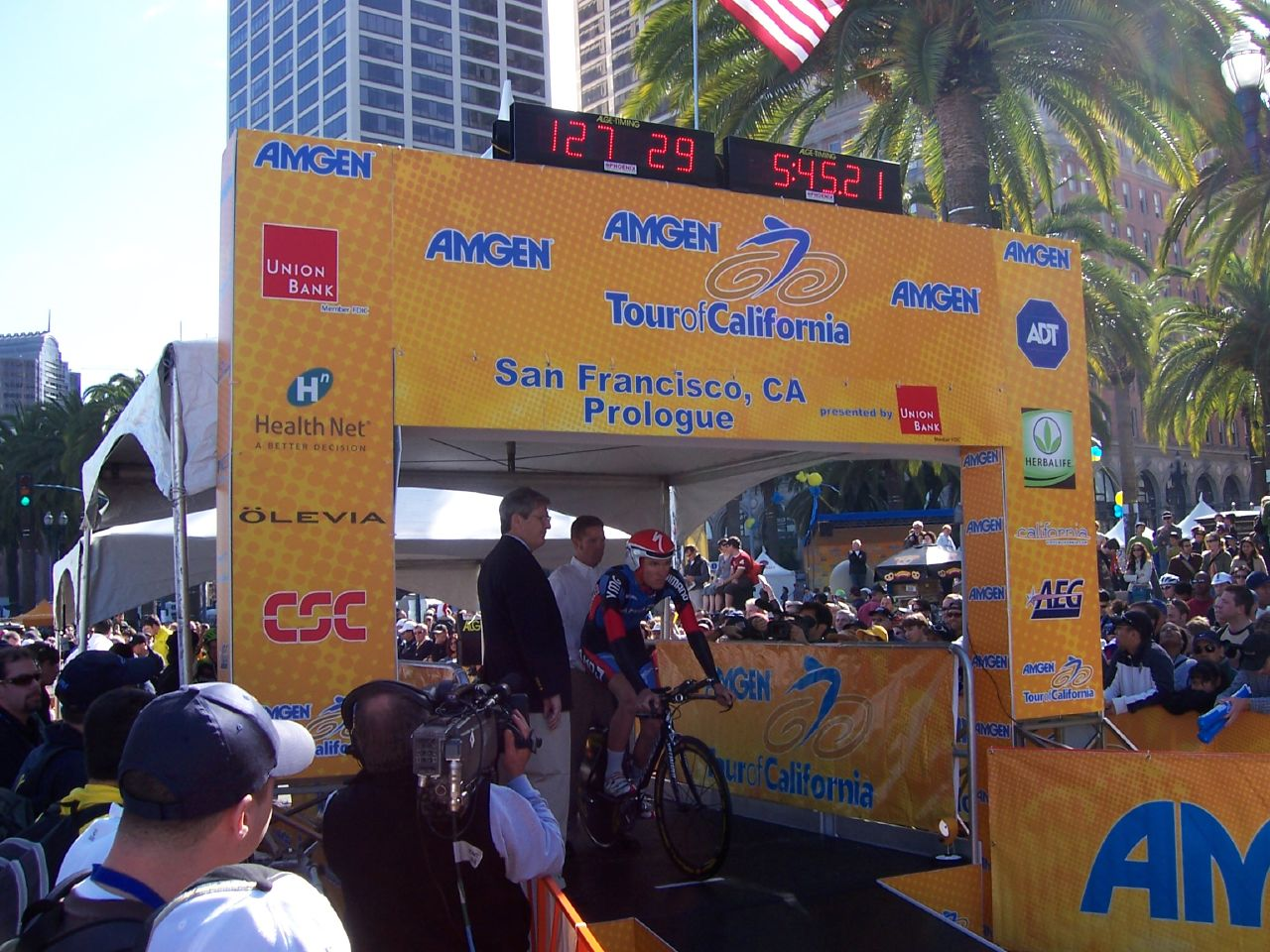
Amgen Tour of California has returned to Newbury Park five times.

The City of Thousand Oaks was formally established on September 29, 1964, and throughout the late 1960s and throughout the 1970s, most Newbury Park land was annexed by the City of Thousand Oaks. The annexed area was formerly controlled by Ventura County, but as of 2016, all but Casa Conejo and Ventu Park is within Thousand Oaks city limits. Together with Thousand Oaks, Newbury Park was part of a master planned community by the Janss Investment Company.

Newbury Park has had an increasing population due to the presence of biotechnology firms and technology corporations, such as Amgen (world headquarters) and Baxter, and other high-technology corporations.

President George W. Bush visited the Newbury Park High School and the Satwiwa Native American Indian Culture Center in 2003.

==== Housing ====
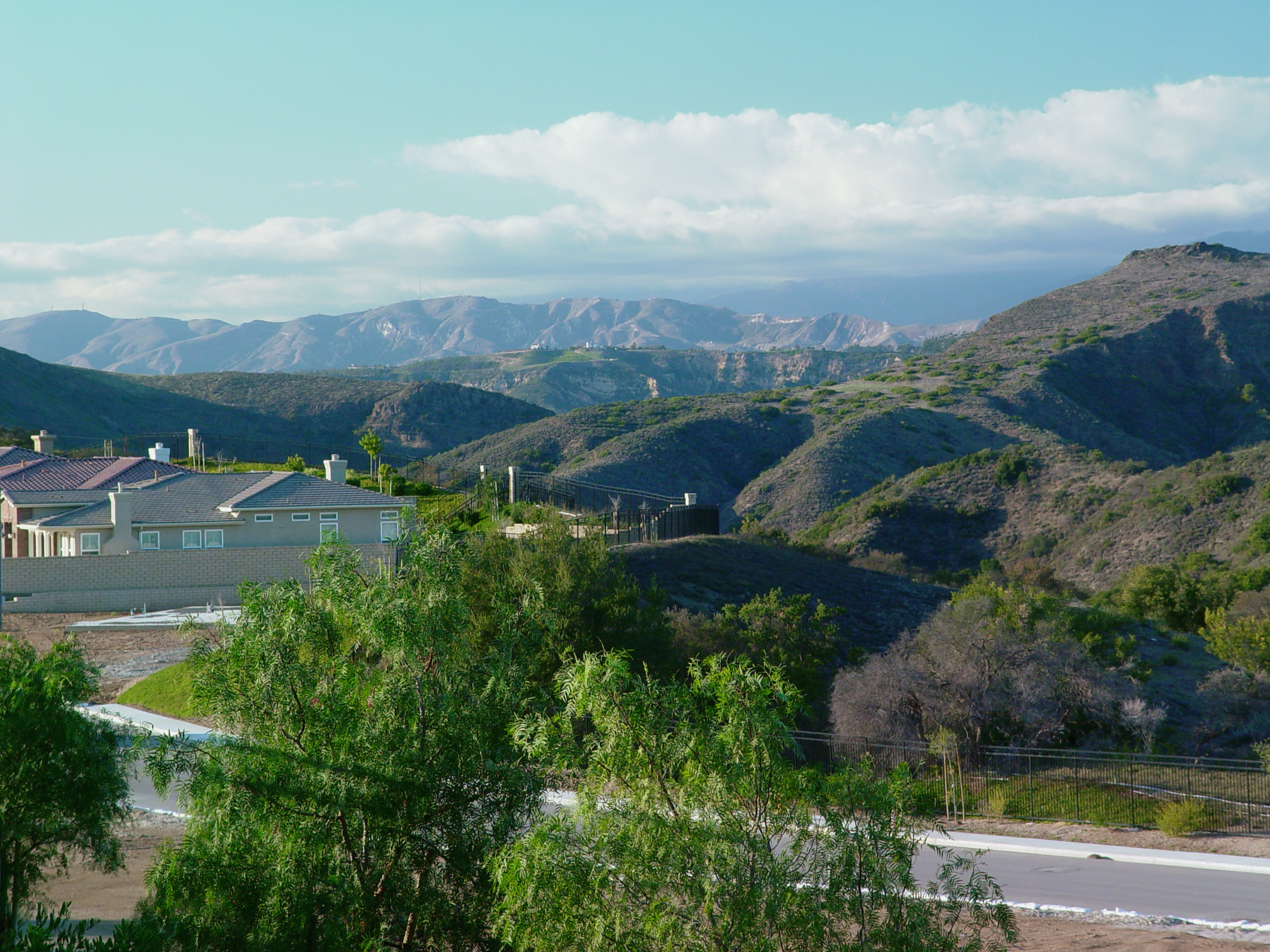
New home construction in the Rancho Conejo Village community, an S&S Shapell Inc community, along Wildwood Canyon

The community contains two major new residential areas, Rancho Conejo Village (built on the site of the former Rancho Conejo Airport, where portions of the film It's a Mad, Mad, Mad, Mad World were filmed) and Dos Vientos Ranch. The first planned community in Newbury Park was Casa Conejo, located in a roughly square-shaped unincorporated area.

== Geography ==
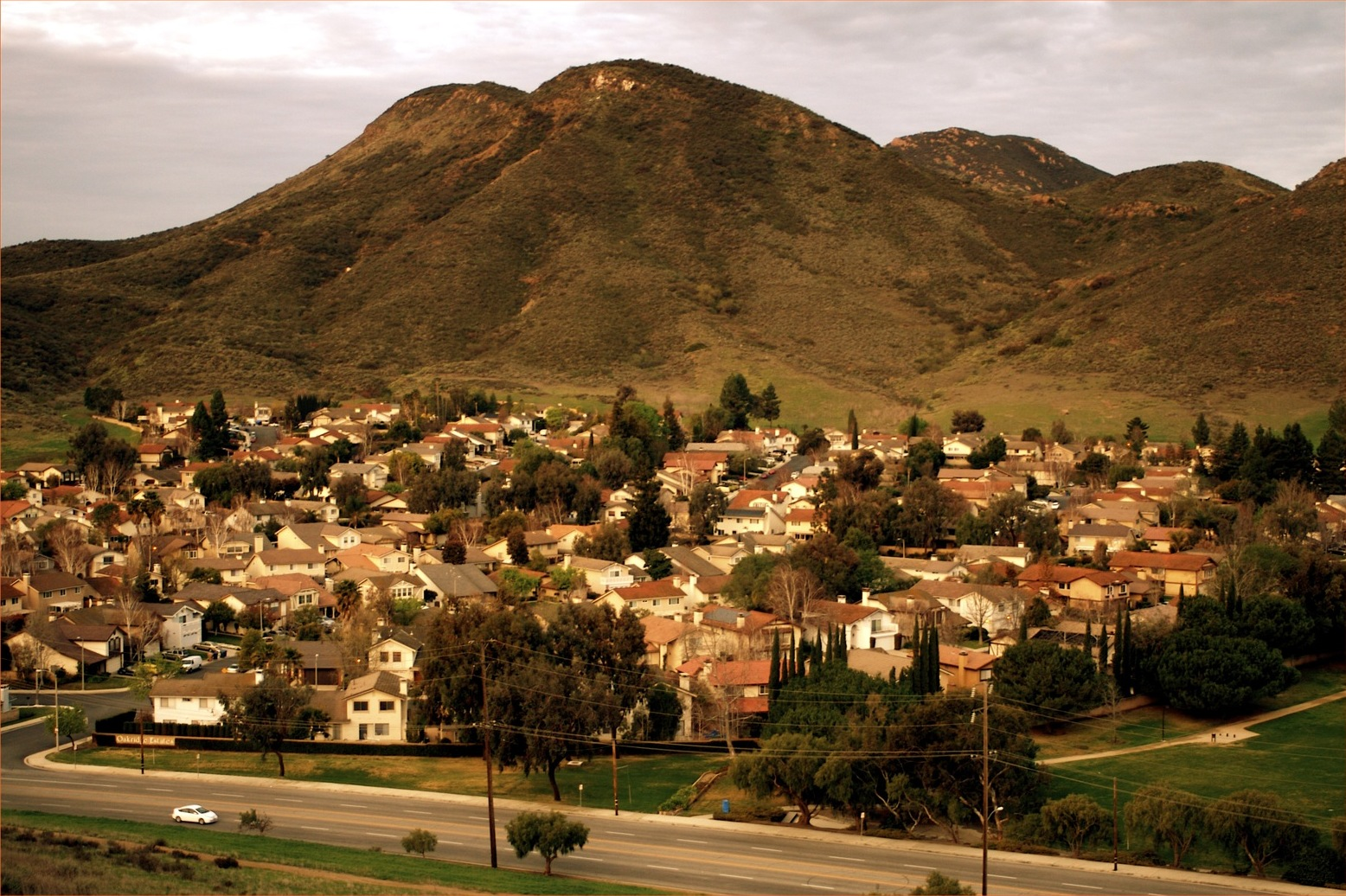
View of the Oakridge Estates neighborhood, an S&S Shapell Inc community, adjacent to Casa Conejo, as seen from Rabbit Hill in Knoll Park

Newbury Park can be described as a town, community, or section mostly within the Thousand Oaks city limits in addition to rural areas west of Thousand Oaks. Newbury Park is bordered by Lynn Road in the east and the Conejo Grade on the west. It borders the Santa Monica Mountains in the south, while Hill Canyon and the ridges of Conejo Canyons Open Space make up its northernmost area. It has an average elevation of 628 feet (191 m) above sea level, and is situated 12 miles (19 km) from the Pacific Ocean. Newbury Park is 42 miles (68 km) west of Los Angeles. It is situated in the southeastern corner of Ventura County, between the Santa Monica Mountains to the south, and protected nature areas such as Wildwood Regional Park to the north. Thousand Oaks proper is to the east and the city of Camarillo is down the Conejo Grade to the west. Newbury Park is made up of ZIP code 91320; however, certain post office boxes by Newbury Road use ZIP code 91319.

Compared to eastern part of Thousand Oaks, Newbury Park remains a significantly more rural community which includes for equestrian areas. The recreational areas accessible from U.S. Highway 101 include the Los Padres and Angeles National Forests. Being located less than six miles from the Los Angeles County line, Newbury Park is in the northwestern part of the Greater Los Angeles Area. Newbury Park is both a benefactor and a victim of the modern-day freeway development. It is a planned community, which originally solely functioned as a bedroom community. In recent times, however, Newbury Park has attracted numerous high-tech industries, keeping many of its former commuters home.

Newbury Park has three freeway exits on U.S. Route 101 (the Ventura Freeway). It can also be reached by crossing through the Santa Monica Mountains from the coast. The main road (Potrero Road) through Hidden Valley leads into Newbury Park. There are numerous trailheads including one into the Santa Monica Mountains that leads to the coast. There are also trailheads to Wildwood Regional Park with trails to other portions of Thousand Oaks and Moorpark.

The unincorporated county islands of Casa Conejo, Ventu Park and Kelley Estates are within Newbury Park. Street sign colors vary from unincorporated areas and areas incorporated into Thousand Oaks.

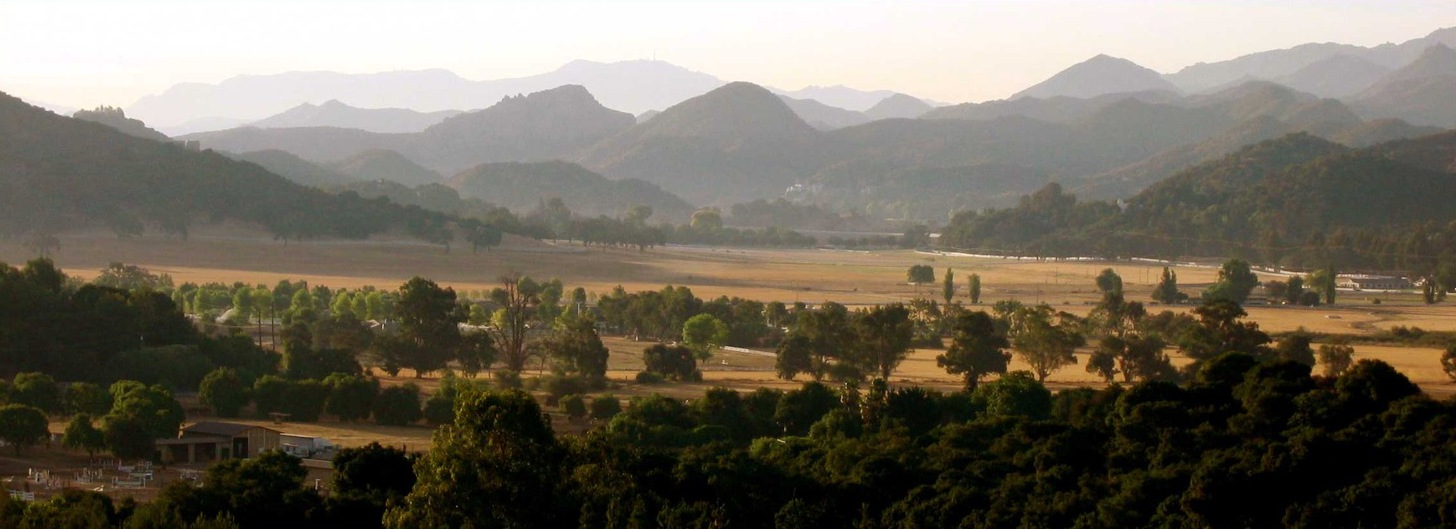
Panoramic view of Hidden Valley as seen from Newbury Park, located within the Santa Monica Mountains

=== Climate ===
While the Conejo Valley is generally cooler than the San Fernando and Simi Valleys, the temperature remains temperate year-long in Newbury Park. The region has a mild, year-round Mediterranean climate or Dry-Summer Subtropical zone climate, with warm, sunny, dry summers and cool, rainy winters. Vegetation is typical of Mediterranean environments, with chaparral and grasses on the hillsides and numerous western valley oaks. Its elevation ranges from about 500 to 1,100 feet (150 to 340 m) (excluding hills). The area has slightly cooler temperatures than the surrounding areas, as it receives cooler air from the ocean through various hill and mountain passes.

Annual rainfall averages about ten inches in Newbury Park, while the humidity averages 52 percent. The temperature ranges from 55 to 77 degrees, and tends to be cooler than in neighboring Thousand Oaks.

There are typically at least a few days per year with lows below freezing, occasionally falling into the upper 20s.

Climate data for Newbury Park, California
Month	Jan	Feb	Mar	Apr	May	Jun	Jul	Aug	Sep	Oct	Nov	Dec	Year
Record high °F (°C)	92 (33)	92 (33)	96 (36)	105 (41)	102 (39)	106 (41)	105 (41)	105 (41)	109 (43)	108 (42)	99 (37)	99 (37)	109 (43)
Mean daily maximum °F (°C)	68 (20)	69 (21)	70 (21)	74 (23)	74 (23)	78 (26)	81 (26)	82 (28)	81 (27)	78 (26)	73 (23)	69 (21)	74.75 (23.83)
Mean daily minimum °F (°C)	41 (5)	42 (6)	43 (6)	46 (8)	49 (9)	53 (12)	56 (13)	57 (14)	55 (13)	50 (10)	44 (7)	41 (5)	48.08 (9)
Record low °F (°C)	25 (−4)	26 (−3)	25 (−4)	30 (−1)	35 (2)	37 (3)	42 (6)	40 (4)	40 (4)	32 (0)	28 (−2)	25 (−4)	25 (−4)
Average precipitation inches (cm)	4.18 (10.62)	4.65 (11.81)	3.57 (9.07)	0.80 (2.03)	0.30 (0.76)	0.05 (0.13)	0.01 (0.03)	0.08 (0.2)	0.32 (0.81)	0.52 (1.32)	1.45 (3.68)	2.48 (6.3)	18.41 (46.76)
Source: weather.com

On February 21, 2019, snow fell on the peak of Boney Mountain. Snow falls on the mountain approximately once every 10 years, previously occurring on December 17, 2008.

=== Cityscape ===
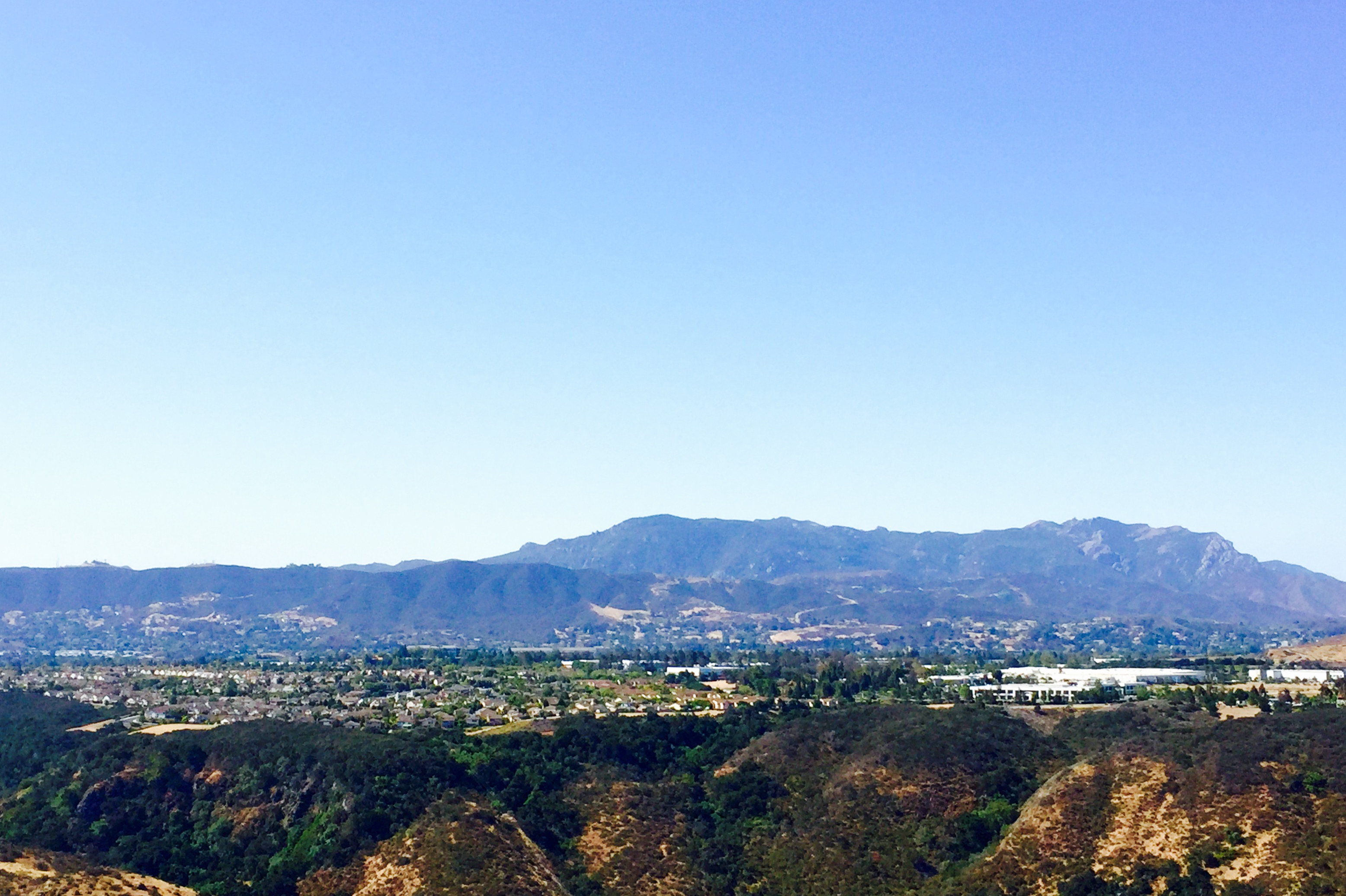
Newbury Park and Amgen seen from Wildwood Regional Park

The physiography consists of prominent knolls, open vistas, surrounding mountains, and native oak woodland. It is characterized by its many rolling green hills. Businesses are centered on both sides of Ventura Freeway, which bisects the community. A number of businesses can for instance be found on Newbury Road, which is named after Egbert Starr Newbury, the founder of Newbury Park. The industrial area is centered around Rancho Conejo in northern Newbury Park, where corporations such as Amgen, Anthem Blue Cross, DesignworksUSA and Shire (formerly Baxalta) are located. The prominent 2,880 ft. Boney Mountain dominates the Newbury Park horizon from almost any angle.

Newbury Park is bounded by Malibu Coast AVA in the south, home of wineries such as SIP Malibu Grapes, Cornell Winery, and Malibu Family Wines.

=== Natural hazards ===
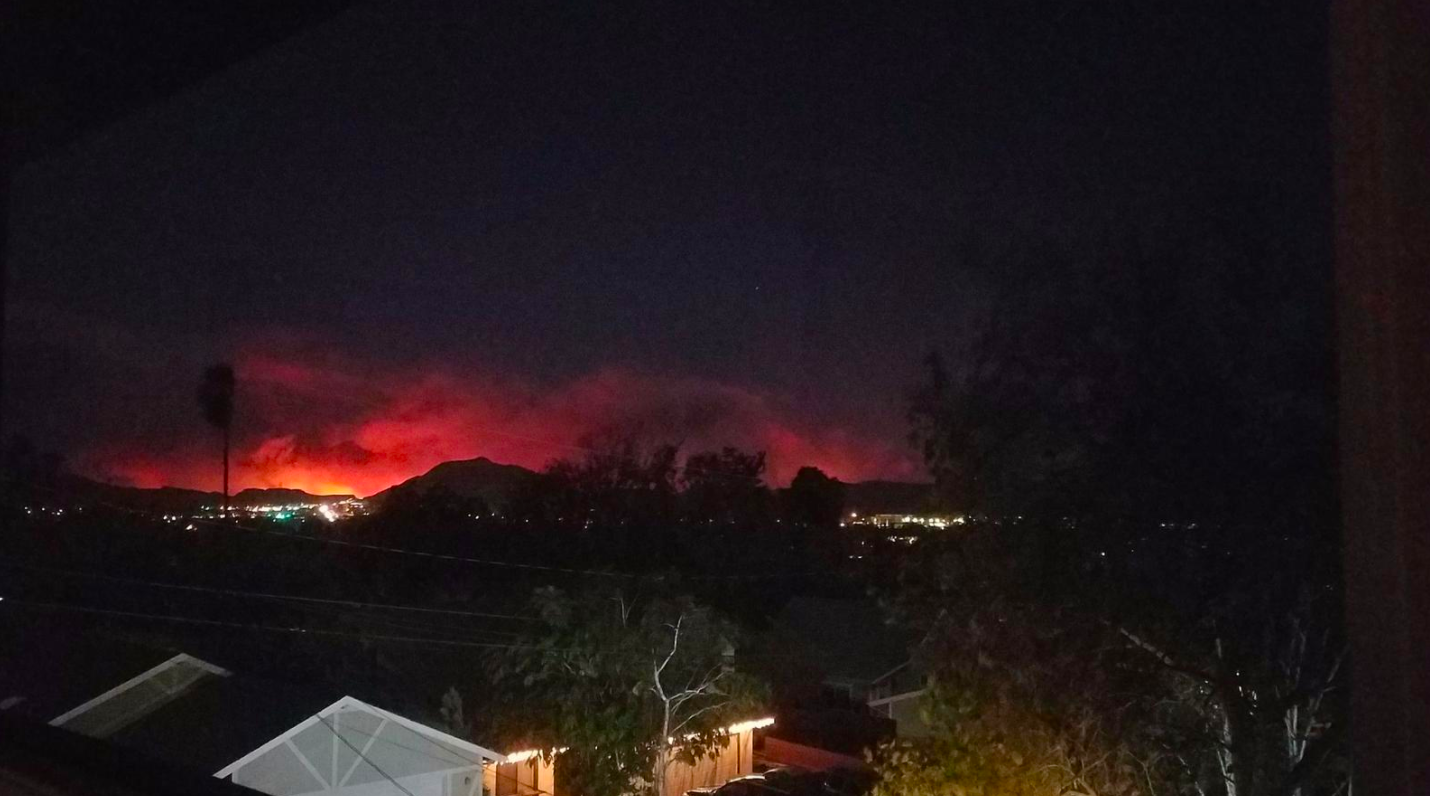
Thomas Fire behind Conejo Mountain, seen from Newbury Park on Dec. 6, 2017

Some of the natural hazards include wildfires, earthquakes, heat waves, droughts, landslides and erosion. The Conejo Valley is relatively often the victim of earthquakes, including the major 1994 Northridge earthquake. Along with most of Southern California, droughts are prevalent. The major drought of 1876–1878, with only six inches of rain in thirty months, devastated Newbury Park and forced its founder, Egbert Starr Newbury, to leave the area.

Two large fires have seriously threatened Newbury Park in recent years.

The Springs Fire started just west of Newbury Park, right off the U.S. 101 freeway, on May 2, 2013. It burned large portions of many of the hills and mountains surrounding the town, but no structures were lost in Newbury Park due to aggressive firefighting efforts. This fire was extinguished four days later, thanks to an unusual rainstorm falling in the area.

The Hill Fire and Woolsey Fire were separate fires which began within 23 minutes of one another on November 8, 2018. Both threatened many homes in Newbury Park, and while the Hill Fire was contained fairly quickly, the Woolsey fire rapidly got worse and destroyed large areas of southern California. Most of Newbury Park was evacuated for 2–3 days during these fires. Local schools were closed for 2 weeks, for the purpose of repair of smoke damage. No structures in Newbury Park were lost, partially due to aggressive firefighting, and also due to previous burn from the 2013 Springs Fire stopping the spread in that direction. These fires started just 15 hours after the mass shooting at the Borderline Bar and Grill, thus making it the most difficult day in the city's history.

Newbury Park was also affected by the massive Thomas Fire of December 2017, and a smoke advisory was issued by the Ventura County Air Pollution Control District. Subsequently, all public schools were closed on December 6, 2017. An additional 3-acre brush fire, nicknamed the Runner Fire, broke out behind the headquarters of Amgen and Shire (Baxalta) on December 5. Both Amgen and nearby SAGE Publishing decided to evacuate their employees due to thick smoke. The fire had a potential of reaching Hill Canyon due to the warm Santa Ana winds, but was contained before causing major damage or injuries.

=== Geology ===
Newbury Park is the westernmost community in the Conejo Valley, which is located in southern Ventura County. It is a broad, wide, and high-lying incline, with an average elevation of 900 feet above sea level. It is bordered by the steep ridge-lines of the Santa Monica Mountains to the south and southeast, Conejo Mountains to the west and north (including the Conejo Grade in westernmost Newbury Park), and the Simi Hills to the northeast.

While the Oxnard Plain and the community of Camarillo are immediately to the west, the Santa Rosa Valley is beyond the Conejo Mountains or through Hill Canyon to the north. Beyond the Santa Monica's to the south is the Pacific Ocean, while the San Fernando Valley is beyond the valley's eastern ridges. The physiography is characterized by open vistas, high peaks, creeks and creek-beds, prominent knolls, and native oak woodlands.

Along with the Santa Rosa-, Tierra Rejada- and Simi Valleys, the Conejo Valley is also drained by tributaries of the Calleguas Creek. Its principal tributary, Arroyo Conejo, flows through Newbury Park in a southwesterly direction before discharging into the Pacific Ocean by the Mugu Lagoon.

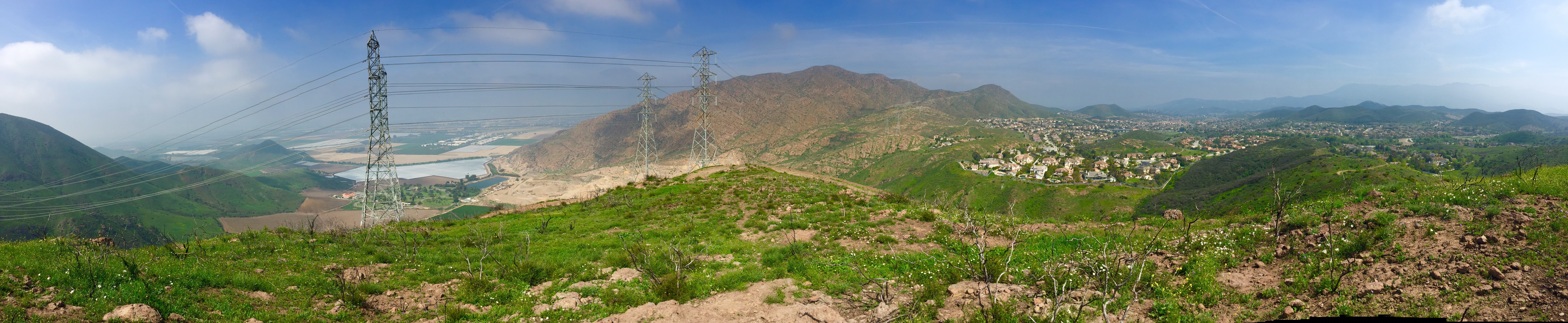
View of Conejo Mountain (center), Camarillo (left) and Newbury Park (right)

=== Wildlife ===
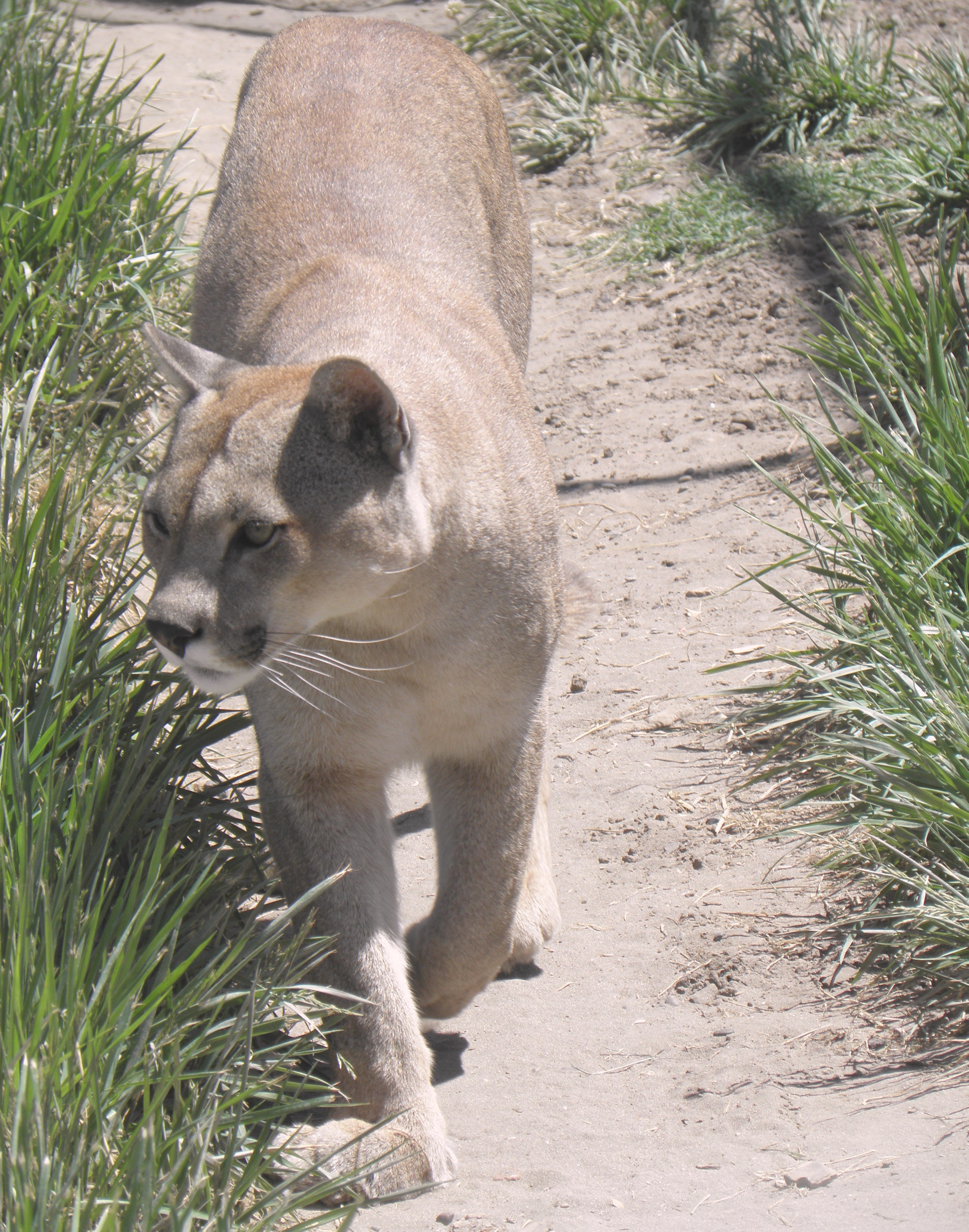
Adjacent to Mountain lion habitat in the Santa Monica Mountains to the south and Wildwood Regional Park to the north, lions are relatively frequently observed in Newbury Park.

Being surrounded by open-space wilderness areas and wildlife corridors to both the south and north, the town is home to an abundance of wildlife. Compared to neighboring City of Thousand Oaks, which consists of nearly 50% developed area, Newbury Park remains a significantly more rural community than its counterpart to the east. Approximately 928 of the 63,000 acres compromising the Santa Monica Mountains National Recreation Area is located within Newbury Park. It is recognized as the largest urban national park in the United States and is a California wildlife preserve. Rancho Sierra Vista in southern Newbury Park is one of the primary park units and functions as a crucial Southern California wildlife-corridor. Wildlife in the southern edge of town is therefore incredibly abundant, and includes animals such as black bears, eagles, porcupines, deer, prairie wolves, rabbits, falcons, bobcats, foxes, hawks, and more.

The National Park Service estimates a population of 10–15 Mountain lions inhabiting the Santa Monica Mountains as of 2015, in addition to mountain lions living permanently in Wildwood Regional Park which borders the town to the north. As a result of bordering numerous wilderness areas, there are few dangers presented for the mountain lion, which is consequentially not a threatened species in the area. Because of their large habitat and few dangers, lions are relatively often creating a hazard in suburban areas of Newbury Park. The mountain lion is not the only mammal threatening both inhabitants and their pets, but outdoor dogs and cats are often prey for an increasing number of coyotes, bobcats, and owls. An increasing number of snake species in suburban areas have also recently been recorded and poses a threat to people and pets as well. Other animals posing potential danger includes venomous spiders and scorpions, most notably the Stripe-tailed scorpion.

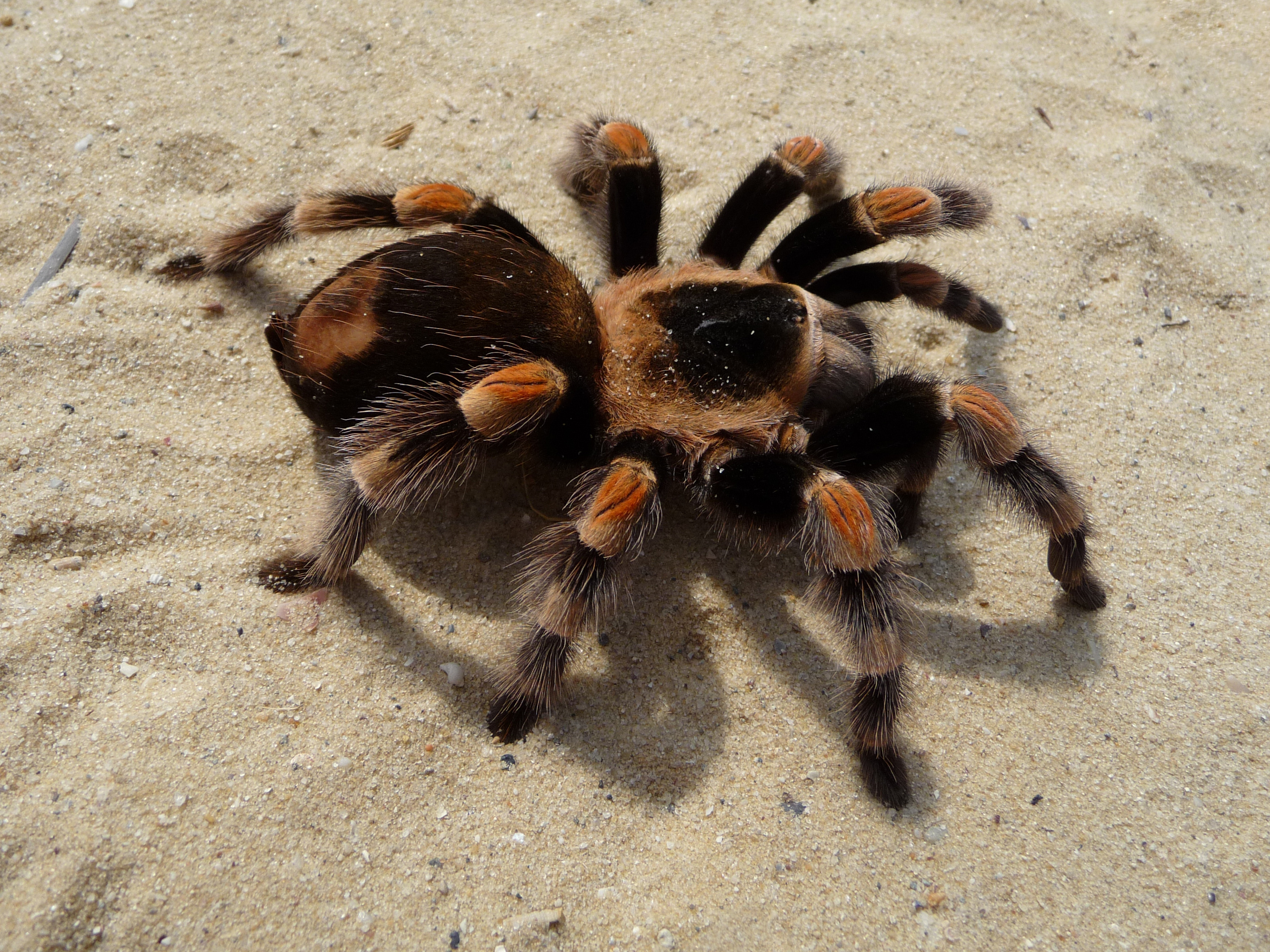
Tarantulas, scorpions and the potentially lethal Black Widow Spider all make their habitat in Wildwood Regional Park.

Mammals more frequently encountered than the Mountain lion include the Valley coyote, Bobcat, Mule deer, Gray fox, Desert cottontail, Virginia opossum, California raccoon, Long-tailed weasel, American badger and the Striped skunk. Other species of mammals include the Ring-tailed cat, Spotted skunk, Botta's pocket gopher, Brush rabbit, Broad-footed mole, California vole, Ornate shrew, and three species of squirrel: the California ground squirrel, Western gray squirrel, and Fox squirrel. Mice and rats include the California pocket mouse, House mouse, Western harvest mouse, Deer Mouse, Agile kangaroo rat, Pack rat, Dusky-footed woodrat, and the Brown- and Black rat. There are eleven recorded species of bats. Amphibians include the Blackbelly salamander, Ensatina, Western skink, and numerous toad- and frog species: California toad, American bullfrog, California treefrog and Pacific treefrog.

The Western pond turtle is an endemic species to the Arroyo Conejo and other creeks. Newbury Park is home to an abundance of reptiles, including lizards such as the Western fence lizard, Coast horned lizard, Common side-blotched lizard, Southern alligator lizard, Teiidae and the California legless lizard. There are eleven species of snake recorded in the Greater Thousand Oaks Area: Southern Pacific rattlesnake, Ring-necked snake, Western yellowbelly racer, California whipsnake, Coachwhip, Gopher snake, California kingsnake, Two-striped garter snake, Western Black-headed Snake, Lyre snake, and Night snake. Thousand Oaks proper is home to 171 recorded species of birds, including seventeen raptors such as the Barn owl, Cooper's hawk, American kestrel, Prairie falcon, Red-shouldered hawk, Golden eagle, Great horned owl, White-tailed kite, California vulture, Northern harrier, Sharp-shinned hawk, Ferruginous hawk, Merlin and Screech owl. Commonly encountered bird species include the House sparrow, House finch, Brewer's blackbird, Common raven, California towhee, Acorn woodpecker, California quail, and the Red-tailed hawk.

== Demographics ==
According to the U.S. Census 2010, 76.81% of the population identify as White, 10.72% Asian-American, 1.88% African-American, 0.09% Native-American, and 6.78% claim 'other'. 19.18% of the people in Newbury Park claim Hispanic ethnicity or heritage. As of 2005, only the community of Newbury Park, not including Thousand Oaks, had a median household income of $83,615. For Thousand Oaks as a whole according to the 2005 US Census Bureau, the median household income was $108,120, while median family income was $110,885. According to Money Magazine, median family income as of 2006 was up to $119,207, which is substantially higher than both the California median income and U.S. median household income of $64,585. The median house value is $678,400.

== Economy ==
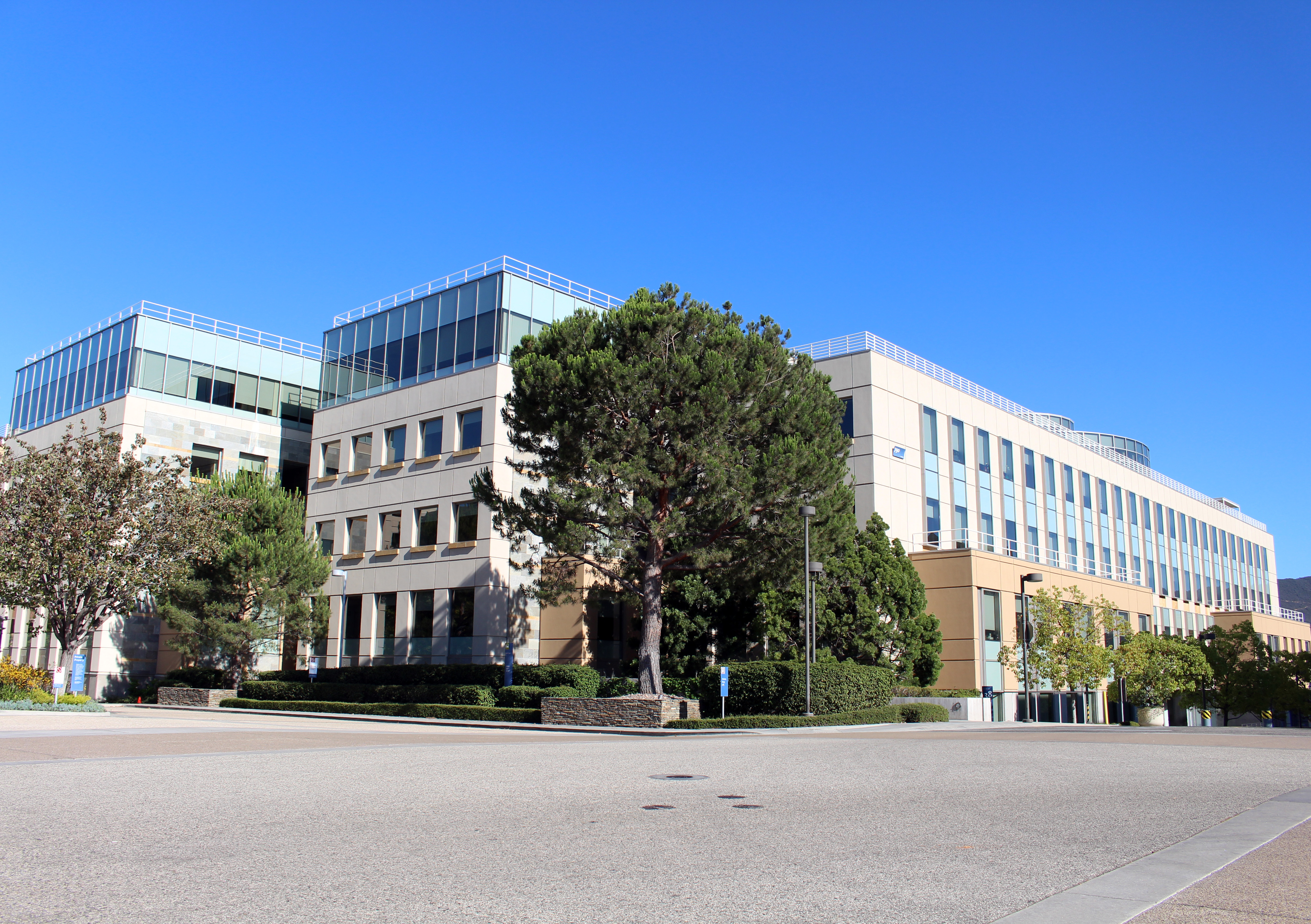
Amgen is headquartered in Newbury Park and is the world's largest biotechnology firm.

Agriculture was the only industry present in Newbury Park for many decades, and dominated the economy until the 1950s. Today, most of the community is part of the City of Thousand Oaks, whose economy is based on a small range of businesses, with biotechnology, electronics, automotive, aerospace, telecommunications, healthcare, and financing occupying most of Thousand Oaks' employment sector. After the incorporation of large parts of Newbury Park, the City of Thousand Oaks helped revitalize sections of Newbury Park through the former Redevelopment Agency. The global headquarters of biotechnology firm Amgen, DesignworksUSA, as well as the industrial design and styling department of BMW are located in the community, as are offices for Anthem Blue Cross, SAGE Publishing, and Skyworks Solutions.

Amgen has its headquarters in Newbury Park, and is the world's largest biotech company as well as the largest employer in the Conejo Valley. Founded in 1980, Amgen now employs nearly 7,000, and has attracted hundreds of scientists to the Newbury Park area. Focused on the cutting edge of molecular biology and biochemistry, its goal is to provide a healthcare business based on recombinant DNA technology. Besides Amgen, other major employers include Shire (formerly Baxalta), Baxter Bio Science, Wellpoint Blue Cross, Skyworks Solutions Inc., and many more. Hewlett-Packard was previously located here. Particularly during and after the 1960s, the area started to attract large corporations, biotechnology firms, and other high-technology industries. As a result of the steadily increasing number of high-technology industries in the area, Newbury Park has been dubbed "the next Silicon Valley".

=== Industry ===
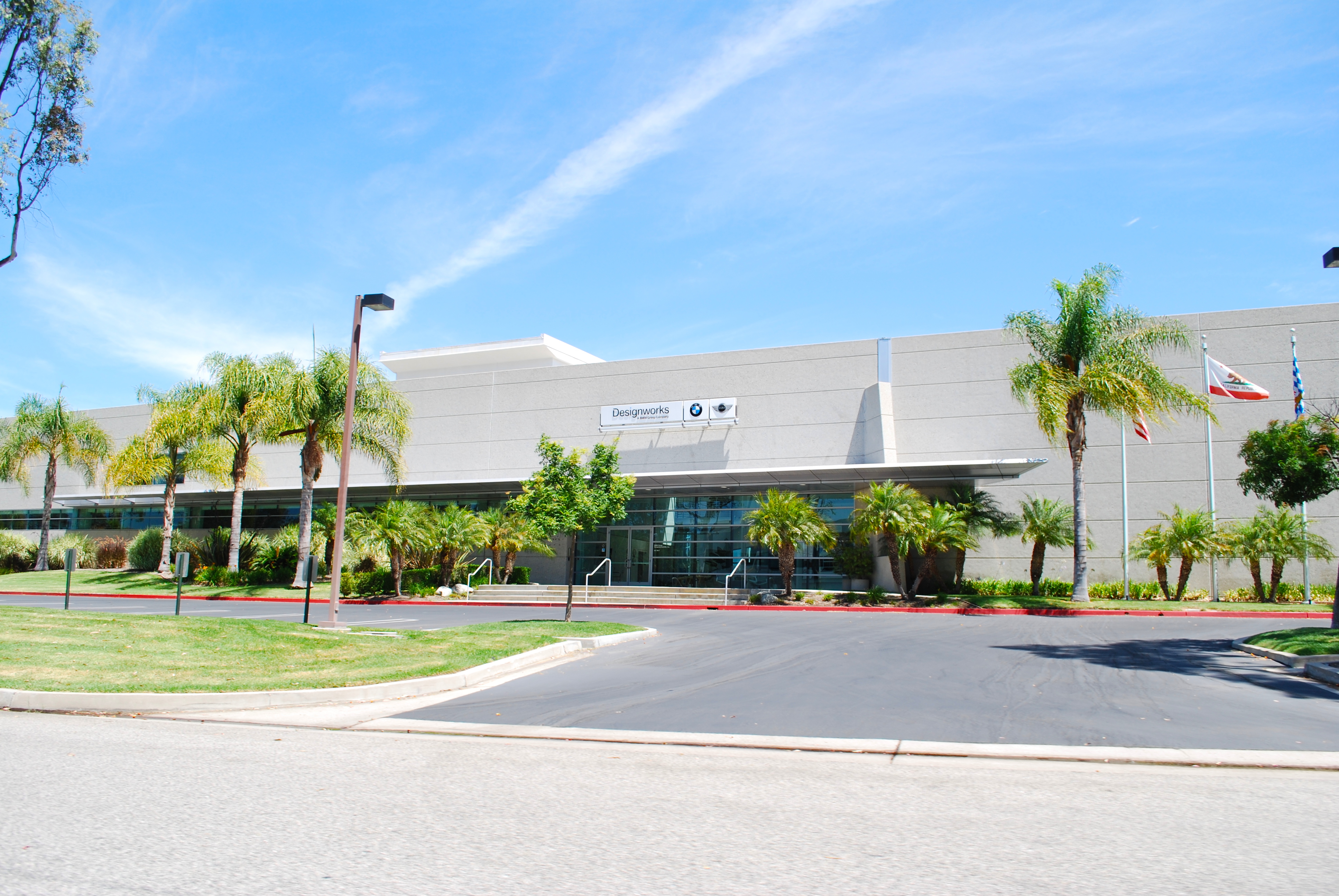
DesignworksUSA is headquartered in Rancho Conejo, and recognized as one of the ten best consultancies in the world.

Northern Newbury Park, which had been land owned by the Janss Corporation since 1916, was zoned industrial and an industrial park started to appear here in 1954. A number of industries soon followed Talley Corporation's 1954 move to Rancho Conejo, including Packard Bell, Westland Plastics and Technology Institute Corporation in 1960. Westinghouse Corporation moved to Rancho Conejo Industrial Park in 1961, while Northrop Ventura and North American Science Center moved here in 1963. Capitol Records opened its mail order center for all record club memberships in 1968, while Metro-Goldwyn-Mayer (MGM) was planning to build a $30 million movie studio here in the late 1960s. Amgen, Anthem Blue Cross, Skyworks Solutions, SAGE Publishing, DesignworksUSA, Alcoa Fastening Systems & Rings, Spectrum, Condor Pacific Industries, and Shire (formerly Baxalta) are some of the current corporations located in Rancho Conejo. Amazon opened a warehouse here in 2018.

As of 2017, Amgen employs 5,125 people, or 7.5% of Thousand Oaks' total employment. It is the largest employer in Ventura County.

Rancho Conejo Industrial Park contains the majority of Thousand Oaks' industrial businesses. It has over 120 properties as of 2017, ranging from 5,000 sq. ft. to 127,000 sq. ft.

== Arts and culture ==
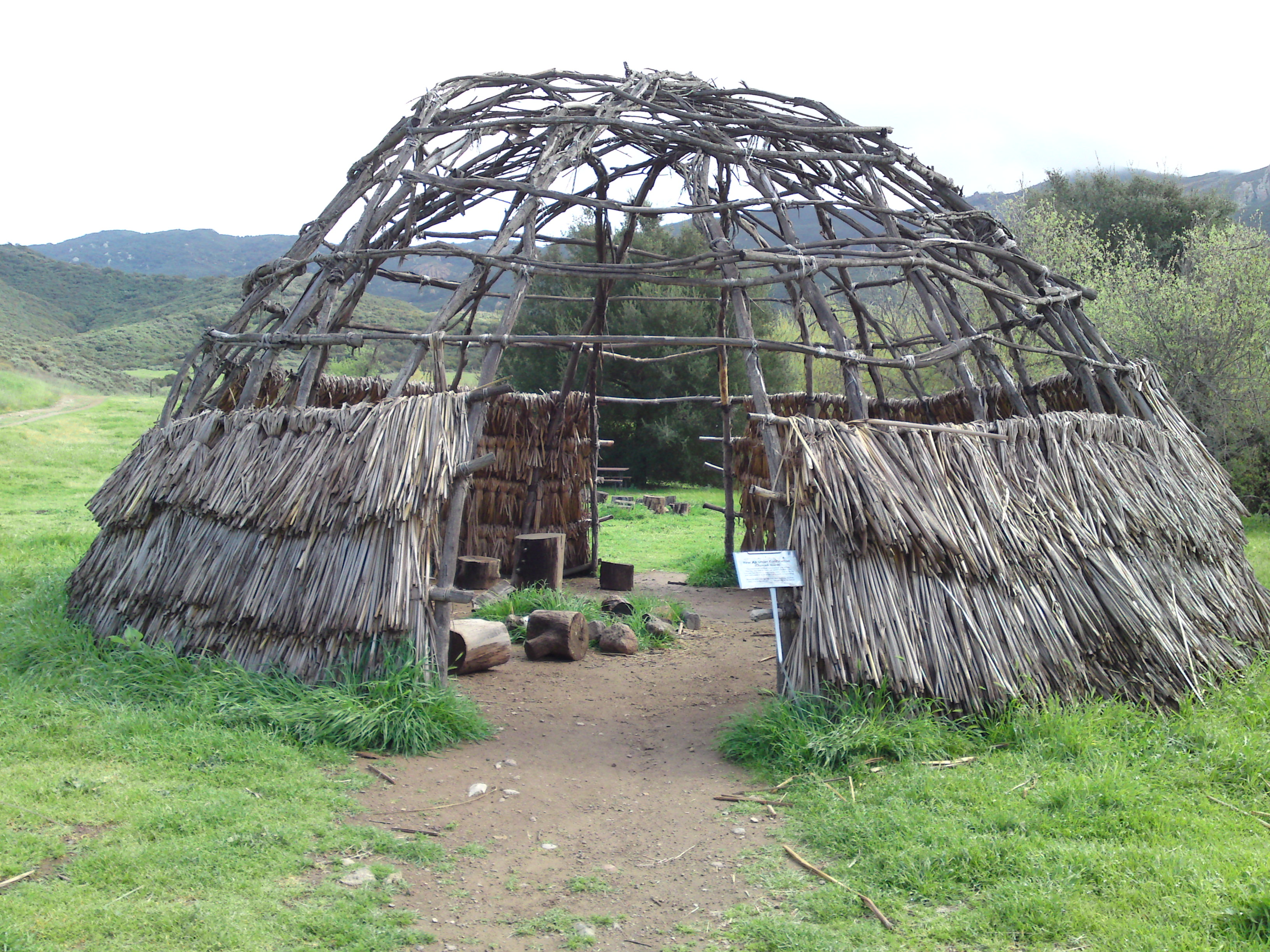
Reconstructed Chumash house ('ap) at Satwiwa

Newbury Park is home to museums such as the Stagecoach Inn Museum and the Satwiwa Native American Indian Culture Center. Furthermore, the community is home to the Thousand Oaks Community Gallery and its Thousand Oaks Arts Festival. Other festivals include the annual Spring Art & Crafts Festival, featuring more than one hundred craftspeople and artists, as well as the Newbury Park Jazz Festival which is held annually at the performing arts center at Newbury Park High School. Newbury Park Jazz Festival has presented numerous notable jazz musicians, including Grammy Award-winner Gordon Goodwin, Peter Erskine, John Beasley, Bob Sheppard and Steven Houghton.

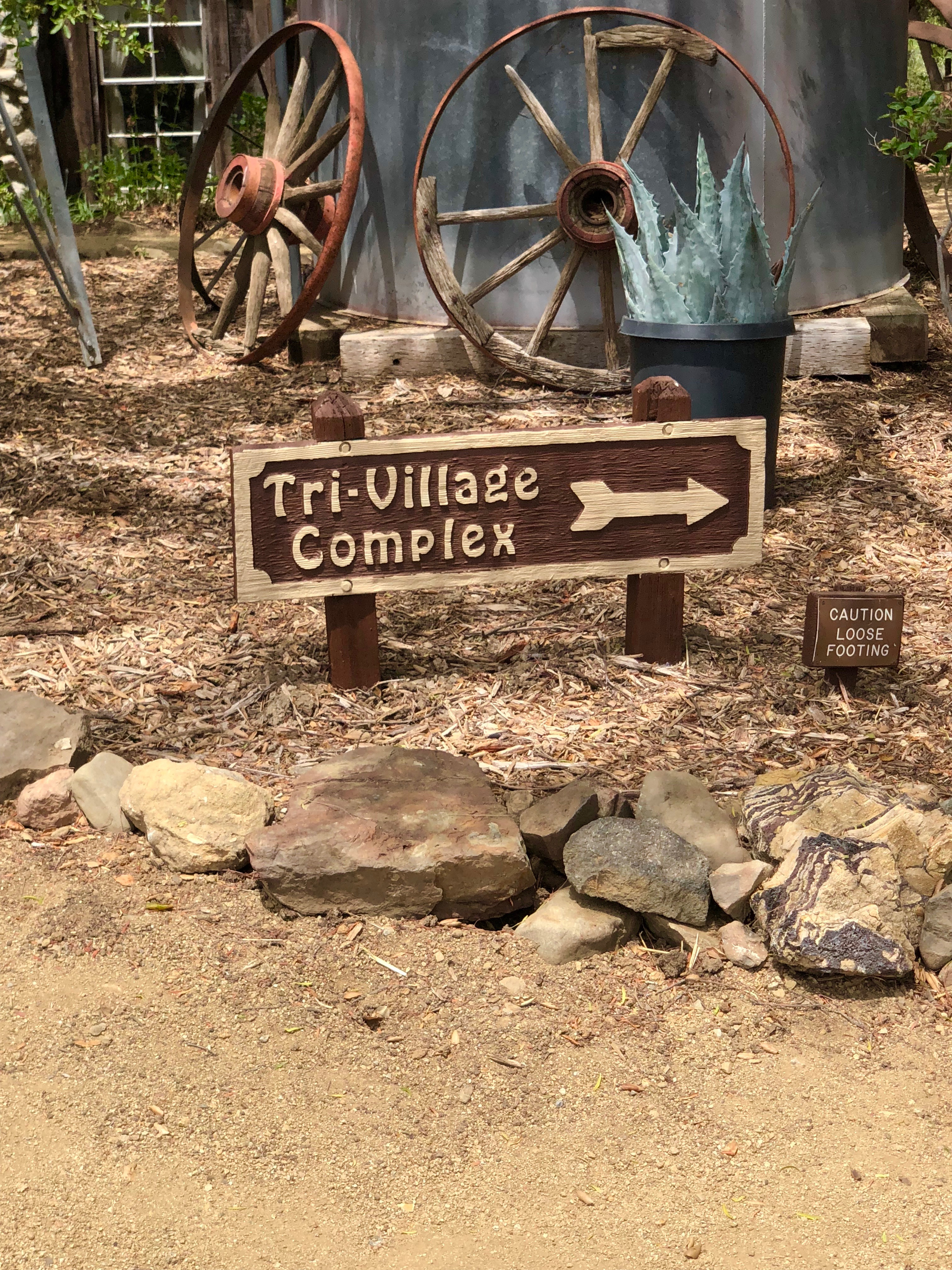
The Tri-Village represents three historic periods: the Chumash, Spanish and Newbury's house.

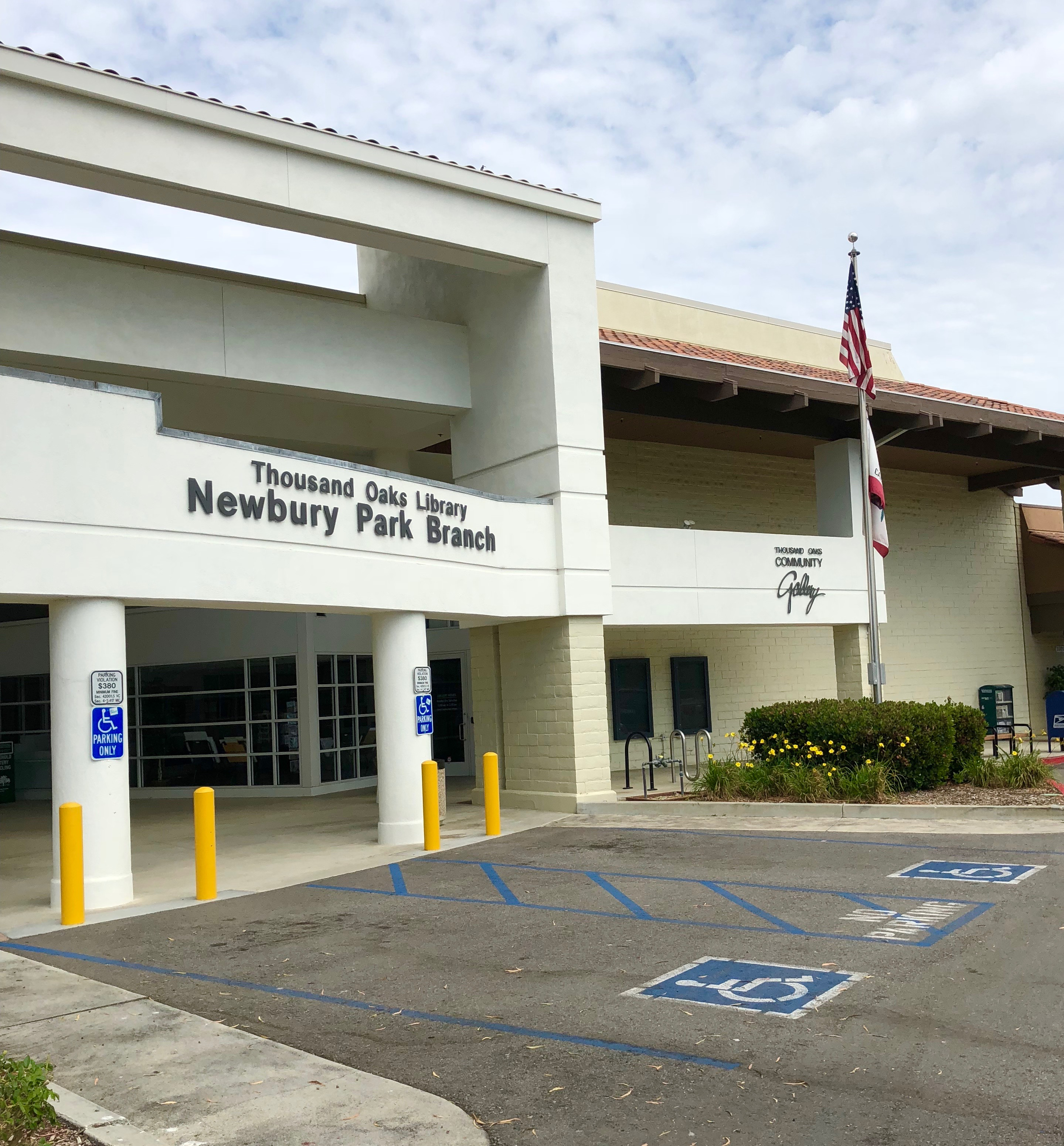
Thousand Oaks Community Gallery is adjacent to Newbury Park Library.

Stagecoach Inn, originally known as Grand Union Hotel, is a city landmark which appears on the National Register of Historic Places. The inn, which originally was erected in 1876, is now operated as a museum. It is home to a replica of the valley's first school, the Timber School from 1889, as well as a carriage house, blacksmith shop and the "Tri-Village." Anderson Exhibit Hall showcases Chumash artifacts and fossils found in the area.

Satwiwa Native American Indian Culture Center is located by the Santa Monica Mountains and is operated by the National Park Service. The center is home to a replica of a Chumash house ('ap), as well as Native-American workshops, programs and art. Satwiwa is located at the foothills of Boney Mountain, a sacred mountain to the Chumash. Satwiwa is used by the Chumash Barbareño-Ventureño Band of Mission Indians for events and ceremonies, including summer solstice and the Hutash ceremony.

Newbury Park Library is a 17,000 sq. ft. (1,600 m^{2}) library which is a regional branch of Grant R. Brimhall Library. The library also houses Thousand Oaks Community Gallery, which hosts visual arts exhibitions, workshops, artist presentations and other events. It is located immediately across the street from Newbury Gateway Park.

== Parks and recreation ==
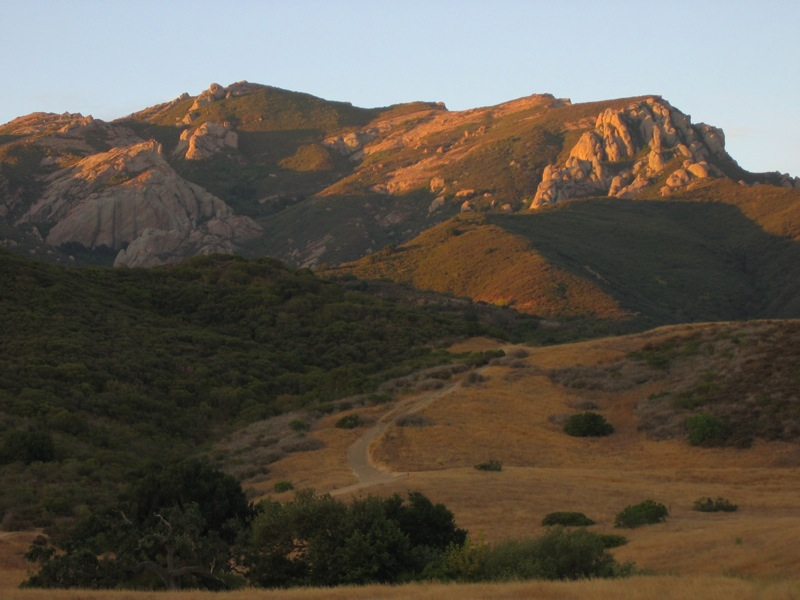
Mt. Boney in the Santa Monica Mountains National Recreation Area, from a Newbury Park trailhead.

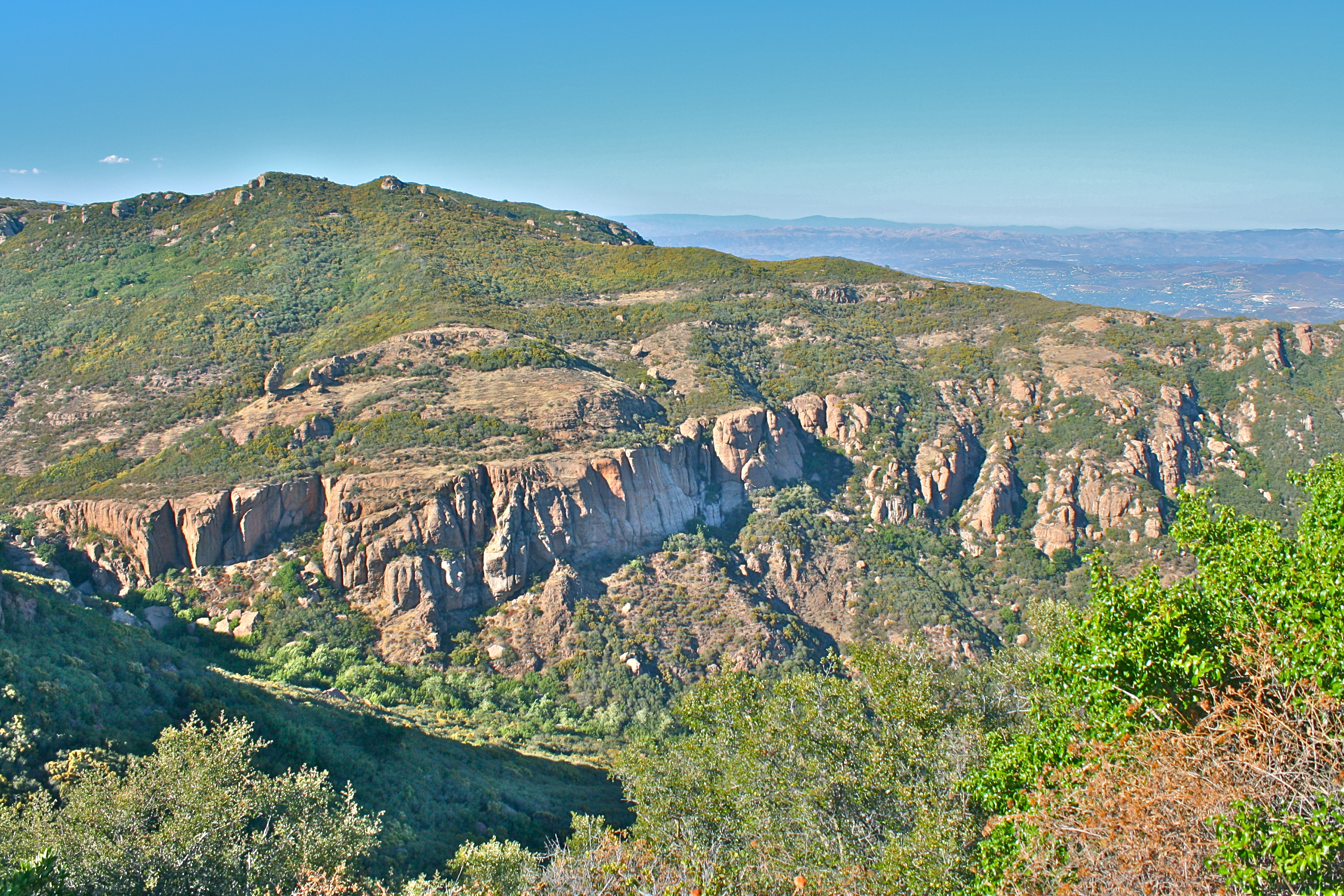
Rancho Sierra Vista/Satwiwa cuts through the Santa Monica Mountains by Big Sycamore Canyon and connects Newbury Park to Point Mugu, Pacific Palisades and Malibu.

Newbury Park offers miles of trails and a natural environment integrated among its neighborhoods. It borders the Boney Mountains State Wilderness Area and the Santa Monica Mountains to the south, the Los Robles Open Space Area to the east, and the Arroyo Conejo Open Space Area and Wildwood Regional Park to the north. In addition to the aforementioned nature areas, the Potrero Open Space is located entirely within the town, while the Hope Nature Reserve is partly in eastern Newbury Park. There are numerous hiking trails nearby, including the Rancho Potrero Open Space Area which connects to trails leading to the Pacific Ocean through the Rancho Sierra Vista Park, the Santa Monica Mountains National Recreation Area and Point Mugu State Park. Rancho Sierra Vista is a National Recreation Area in Newbury Park's southern edge and is administrated by the U.S. National Park Service. With more than a hundred miles of trails in the Santa Monica Mountains, the Rancho Sierra Vista in southern Newbury Park is a popular nature area for hiking, mountain biking, camping, horseback-riding, and other recreational activities. While the Backbone Trail leads to Will Rogers State Beach in the Los Angeles neighborhood of Pacific Palisades, Sandstone Peak is the highest mountain in the Santa Monica Mountains and another popular hiking destination. The peak provides views of the Pacific Ocean, Malibu, Santa Monica, Conejo Valley, and numerous Channel Islands. The Conejo Mountain Edison Road Trail, commonly known as the Powerline Trail, is located in the Dos Vientos Open Space Area and provides panoramic views of the cities of Camarillo and Oxnard.

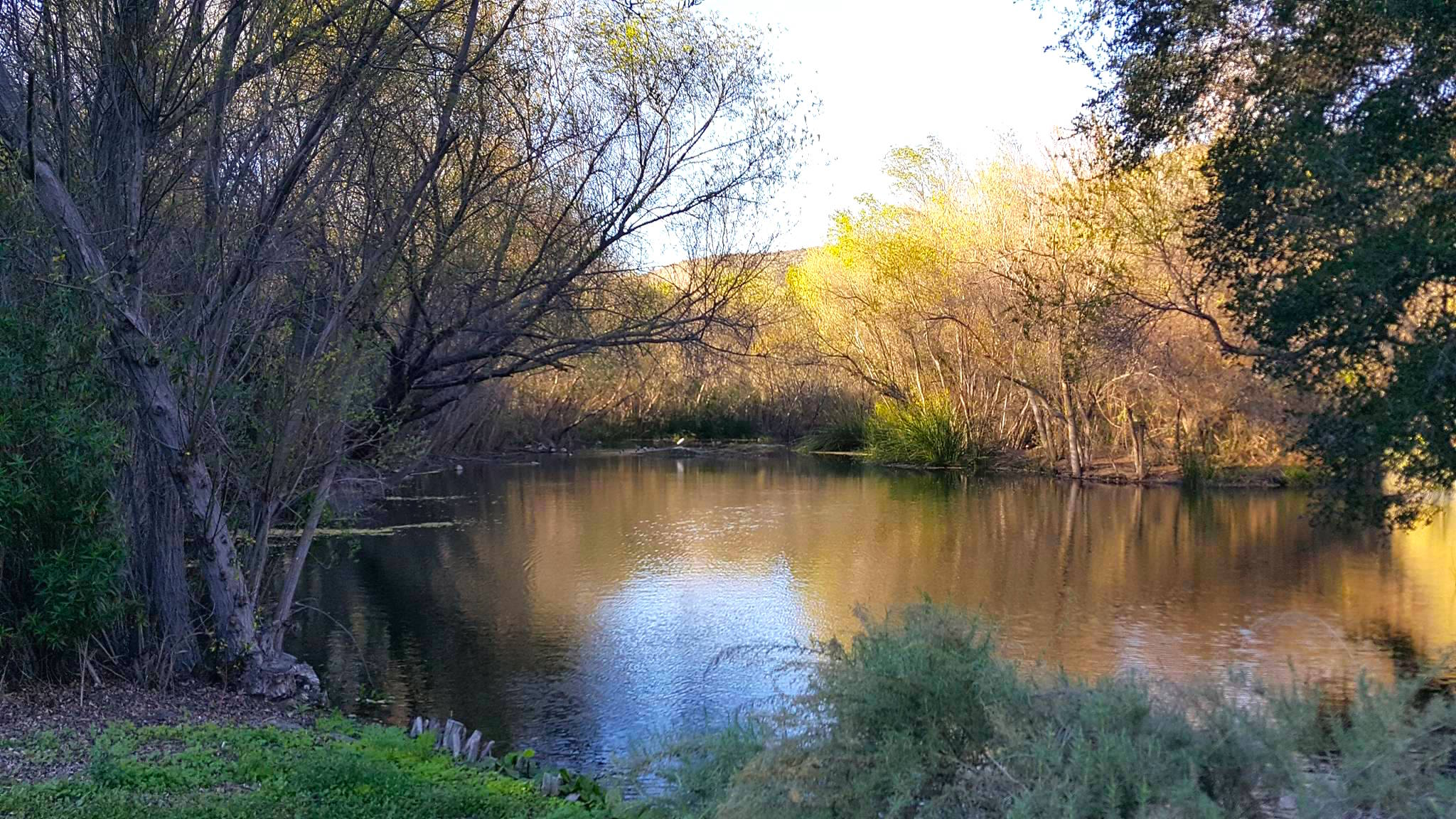
Hill Canyon Wetlands make up 15 acres of the La Branca preserve and is a habitat for the Western pond turtle and other reptile-, fish- and bird species.

On the northern end is Wildwood Regional Park, which offers fourteen trails covering more than 17 miles (27 km). Wildwood is recognized as a natural attraction and a contributing factor to Ventura County being ranked the most desirable U.S. county to live in by The Washington Post in 2015. The regional park comprises 1,732 acres (7.01 km^{2}) and borders 1,397 acres (5.65 km^{2}) of open space. It is accessible from northern Newbury Park and is located within the Thousand Oaks city limits. While Wildwood provides trails to the cities of Thousand Oaks and Moorpark, the Los Robles Trail is a 25-mile (40 km) contiguous route to Westlake Village. Point Mugu is accessible through the Rancho Sierra Vista/Satwiwa in the Santa Monica Mountains to the south. The Santa Monica Mountains National Recreation Area comprises more than 63,000 acres (250 km^{2}) of natural open-space area, where approximately 928 acres are located within the town's southern edge.

Two campgrounds, Danielson and Circle X, are reached from Potrero Road in Newbury Park.

=== List of parks and public open-space ===
List of public-owned open-space areas and parks in Newbury Park:

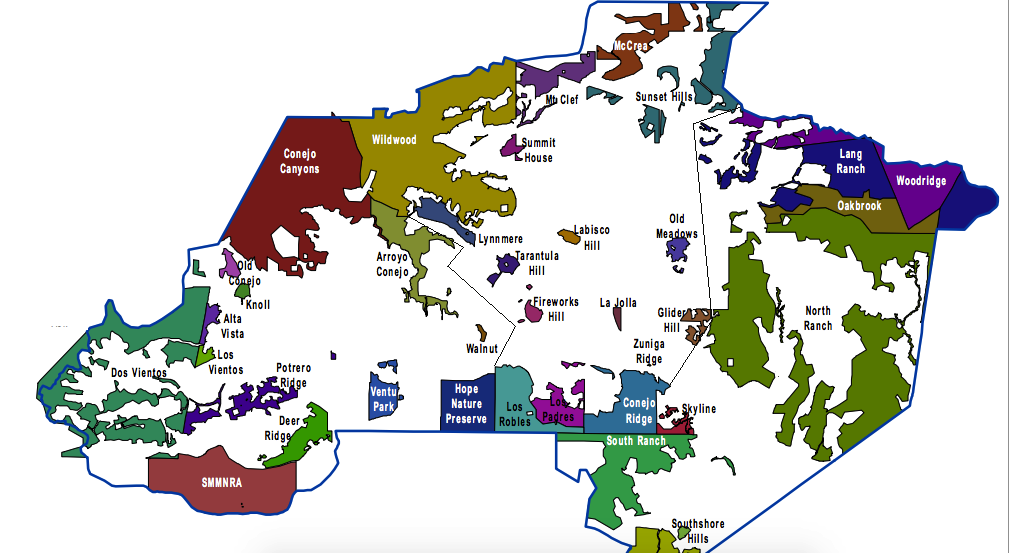
Map of public-owned open-space areas in the Conejo Valley, including Newbury Park to the left

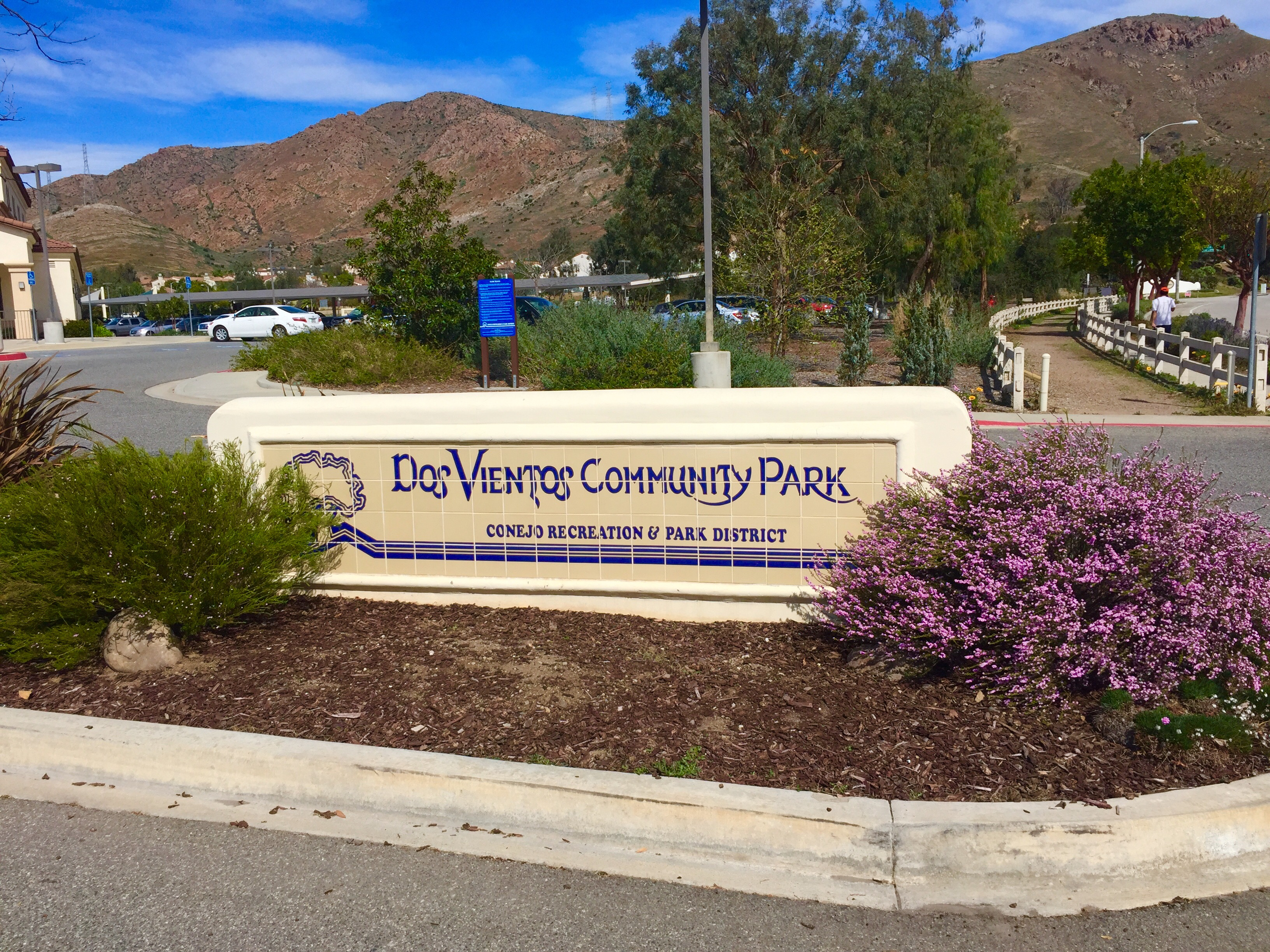
Dos Vientos Community Park, largest CRPD-operated community park in the Conejo Valley

- Alta Vista Open Space
- Arroyo Conejo Open Space
- Banyan Park
- Borchard Community Park
- Conejo Canyons Open Space
- Cypress Park
- Deer Ridge Open Space
- Del Prado Playfield
- Dos Vientos Community Park
- Dos Vientos Open Space
- Dos Vientos Neighborhood Park
- Hickory Park
- Kimber Park
- Knoll Open Space (Knoll Park)
- Los Vientos Open Space
- Lynn Oaks Park
- Newbury Gateway Park
- Old Conejo Open Space
- Peppertree Playfield
- Potrero Ridge Open Space
- Rancho Conejo Playfields
- Rancho Sierra Vista Park (Satwiwa)
- Santa Monica Mountains National Recreation Area (SMMNRA)
- Stagecoach Inn Park
- Ventu Park Open Space
- Walnut Grove Park
- Walnut Open Space
- Wendy Park

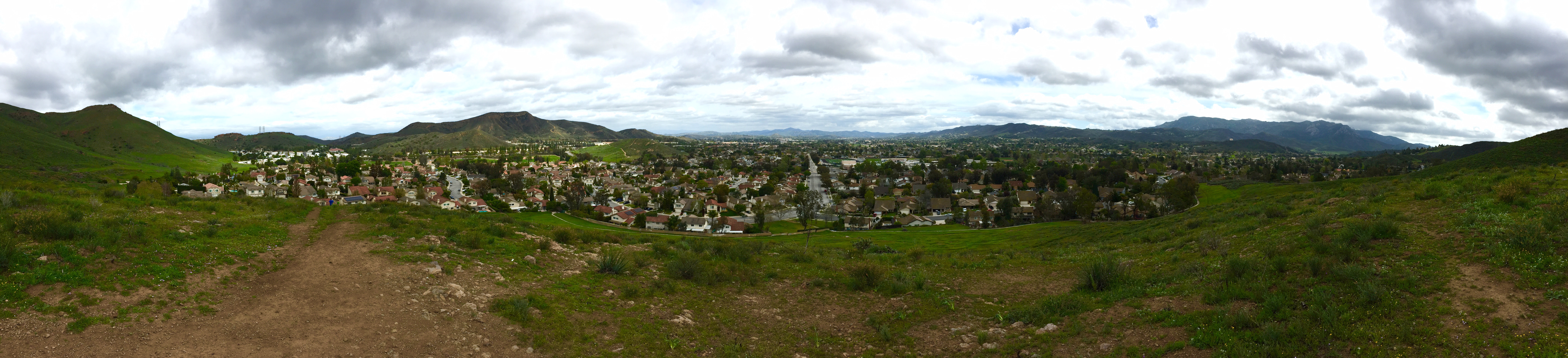
Newbury Park as seen from the Alta Vista Open Space by the Conejo Grade in westernmost Newbury Park, looking east.

== Politics ==
Newbury Park is considered a stronghold for the Republican Party, and had three registered Republican voters for every Democratic voter as of 2007.

Calvary Chapel Godspeak in Newbury Park is a church that is often visited by Republican politicians for speeches and events. Some notable speakers include Republican nominees for president, Rand Paul in 2013 and Newt Gingrich in 2011. The senior pastor is Rob McCoy, who was the 2014 Republican candidate for California's 44th State Assembly district and is a former mayor of Thousand Oaks.

Richard Sybert of Newbury Park was the Republican candidate for the House of Representatives in 1994 and the 1996, but was defeated both times.

== Public safety ==
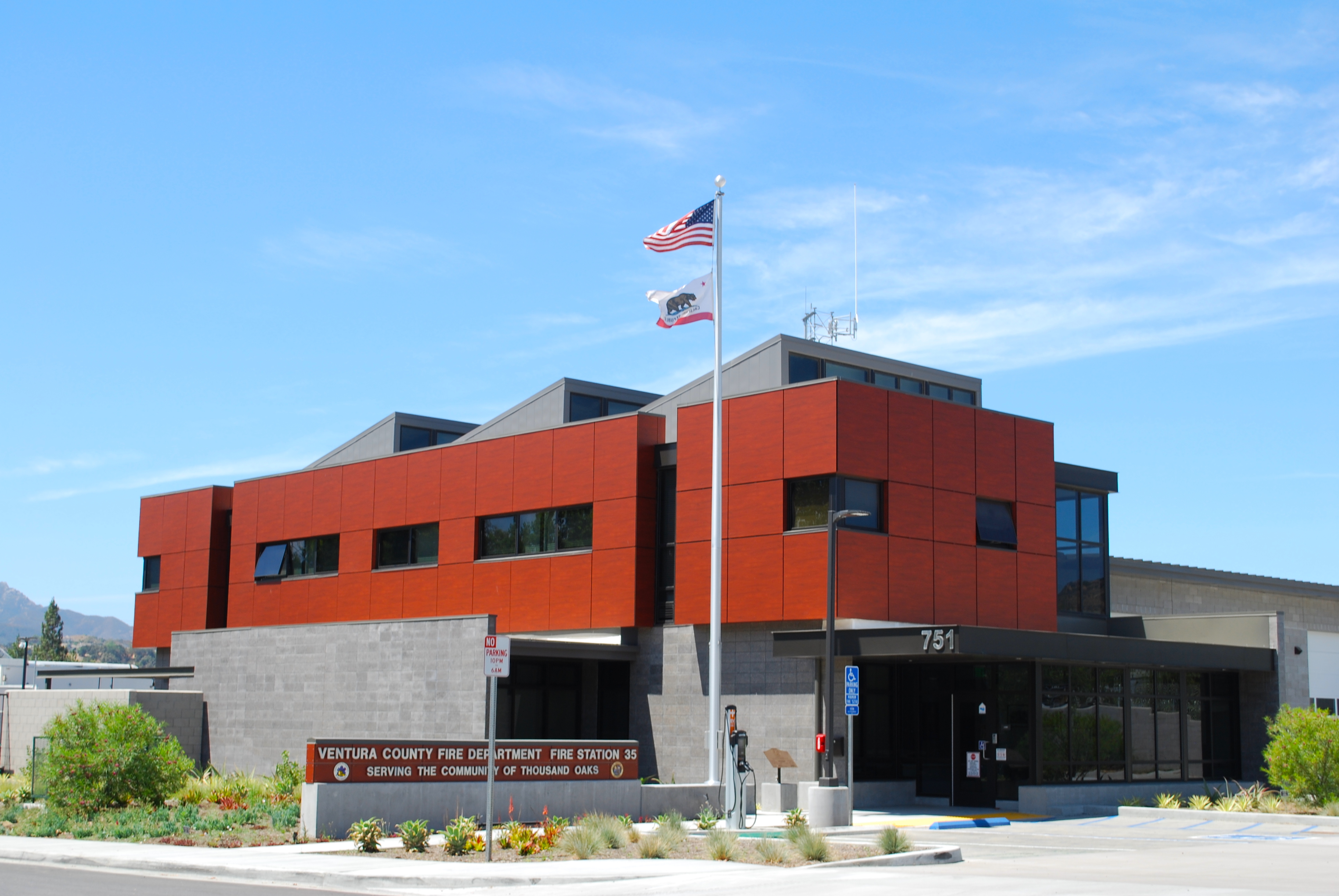
The 11,233 sq. ft. Newbury Park Fire Station on Mitchell Rd, which opened in 2017

=== Fire department ===
The Ventura County Fire Department (VCFD) provides fire protection and emergency medical services. Two fire stations are located in Newbury Park.

=== Law enforcement ===
Ventura County Sheriff's Office provides law enforcement services for Newbury Park. They operate a resource center in the city.

=== Crime ===
Newbury Park has one of the lowest crime rates in California. Thousand Oaks has ranked as the fourth-safest city in the United States by The FBI.

Newbury Park experienced its first homicide in over ten years on November 30, 2017.

== Education ==
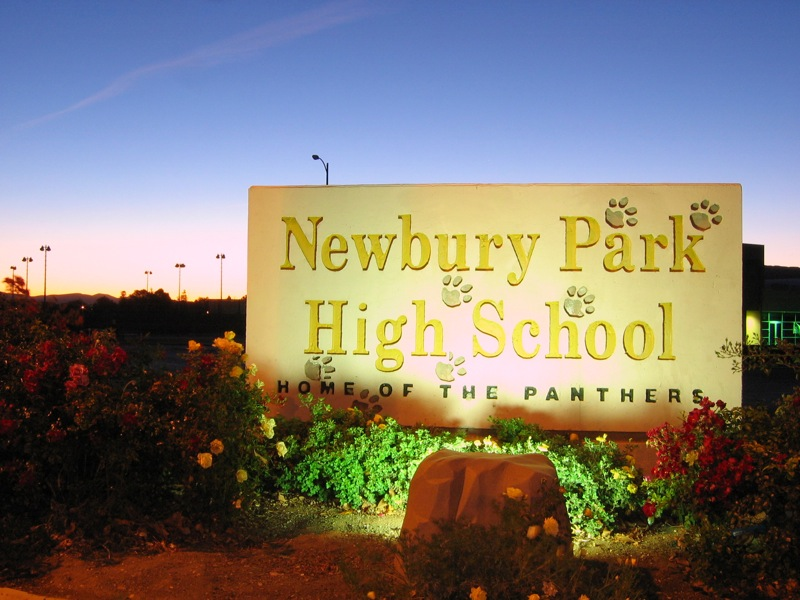
Newbury Park High School is an International Baccalaureate World School.

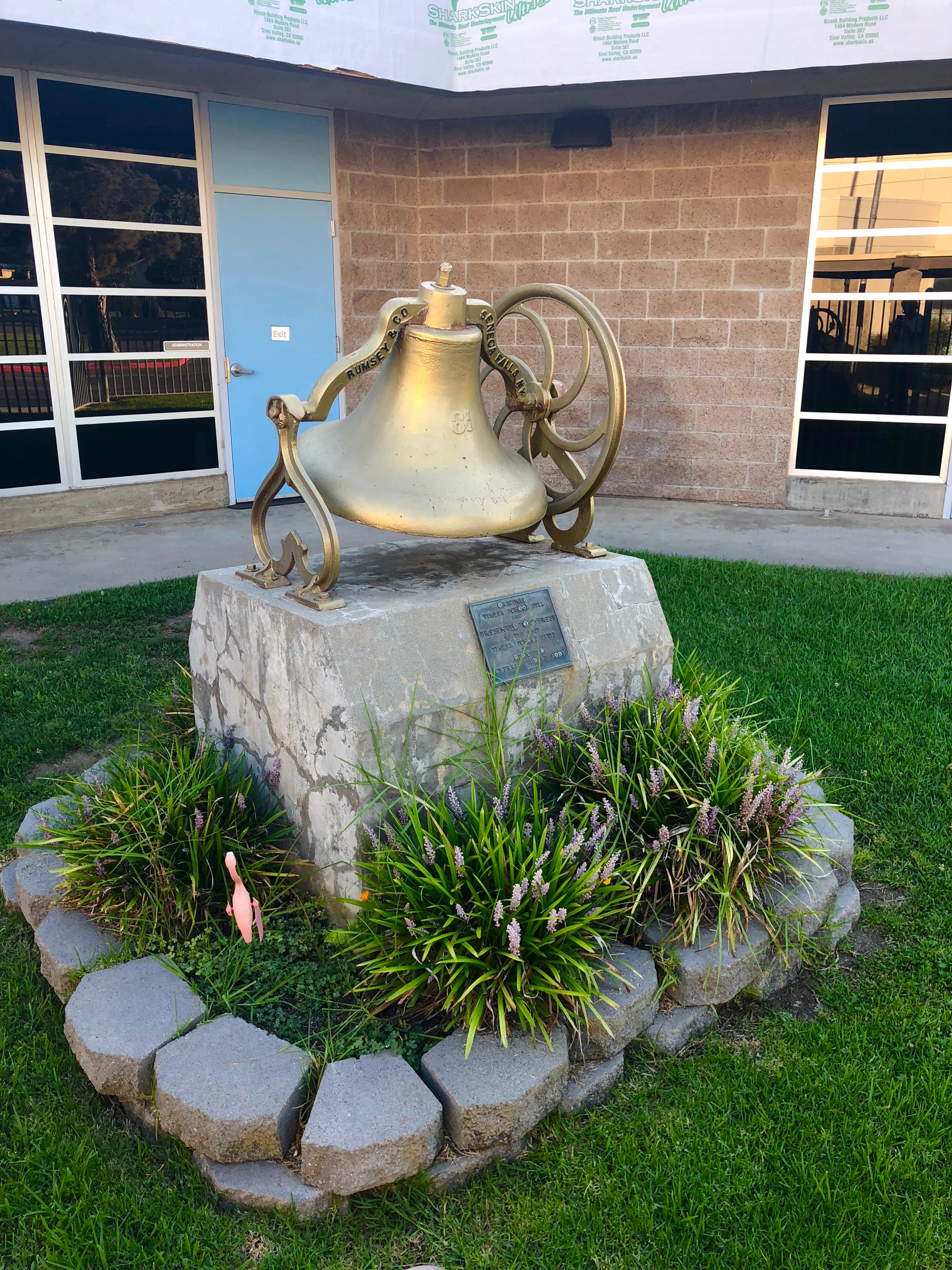
The 1888 Timber School bell is placed on a monument stand at Cypress Elementary School.

Newbury Park High School has over 2,600 students and a newly refurbished multi-sport stadium. Intermediate schools include Sequoia Middle School and the recently constructed Sycamore Canyon School in Dos Vientos Ranch. All are part of the Conejo Valley Unified School District.

Timber School, now known as Conejo Valley High School, is the first of the existing schools, having been built in 1924 to replace the first one-room schoolhouse that was built in 1889. Recent additions to the school were made in the late 1940s and 1950s. Newbury Park Adventist Academy is the second of the existing schools in Newbury Park, founded in 1947.

- Conejo Valley Unified School District
- Newbury Park High School
- Redwood Middle School
- Sequoia Middle School
- Sycamore Canyon Middle School
- Newbury Park Adventist Academy
- Conejo Adventist Elementary School
- Walnut Elementary School
- Banyan Elementary School
- Cypress Elementary School
- Maple Elementary School

== Media ==
Thousand Oaks Acorn is the main newspaper serving Newbury Park, while Ventura County Star is a larger regional paper covering the county. Former Newbury Park newspapers have included the Newbury Star by editor Shirley Haigh Sheets (Peggy Page) in the 1960s, as well as Our Town USA and The Newburian, which was published by Newbury Park Adventist Academy with editor Pat Horning. Joseph Canale became the editor of Newbury Park Reporter, after he was sent here in order to establish a Newbury Park edition of the Star Free Press.

== Transportation ==
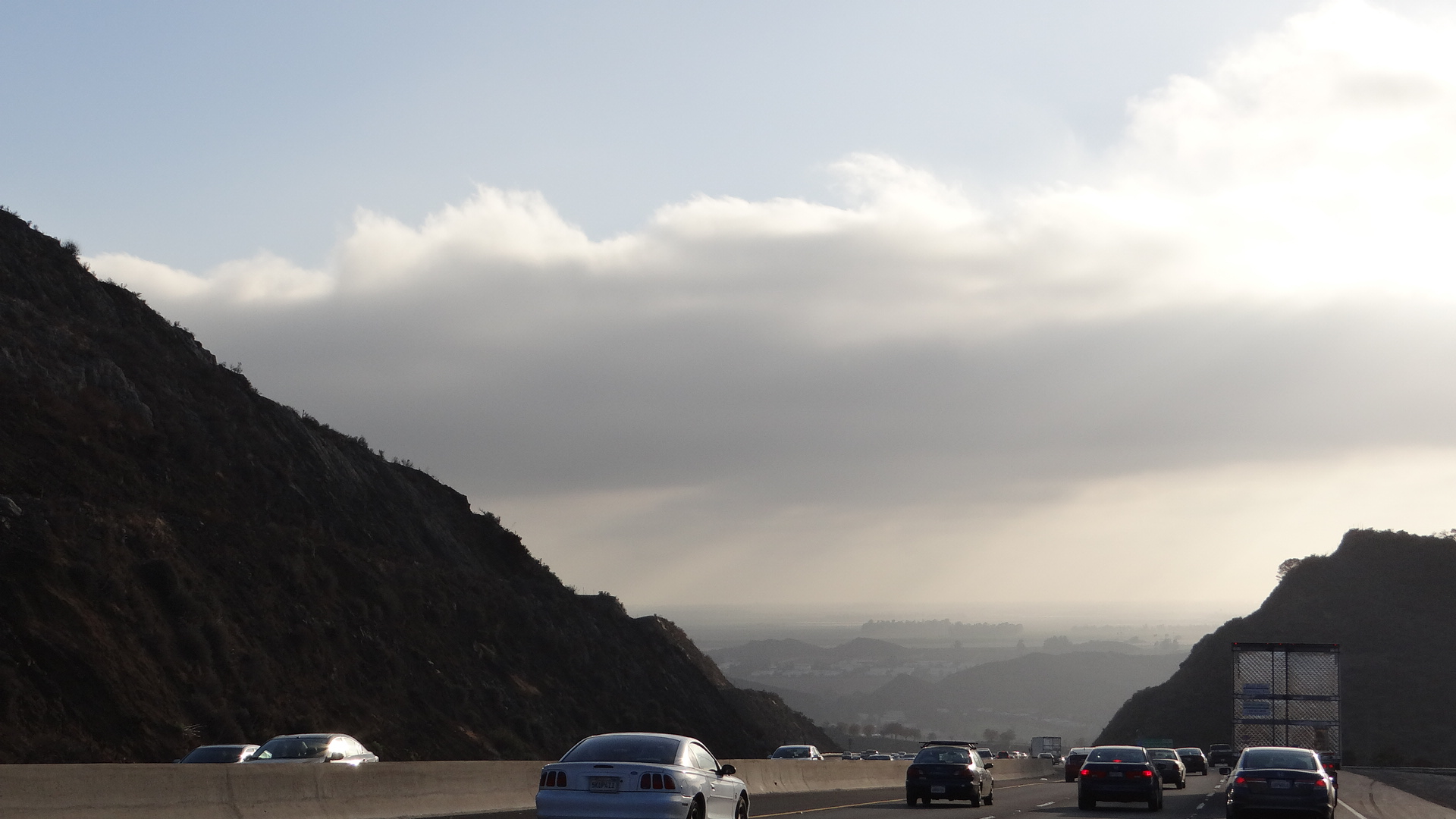
Driving Northbound on the US 101 Ventura Freeway through the Conejo Grade, in the westernmost portion of the Santa Monica Mountains in Newbury Park

Newbury Park may be reached from four freeway exits on the Ventura Freeway (U.S. Route 101): Exit 46 for Ventu Park Road, Exit 47A for Rancho Conejo Boulevard, 47B for Borchard Road, and Exit 47B/47C for Wendy Drive. Additionally, the community may be reached on route one (Gold Line) by the Thousand Oaks Transit (TOT), which also serves Thousand Oaks, CA and Westlake Village, CA. Other regional transportation services include Ventura Intercity Service Transit Authority (VISTA) and LADOT Commuter Express. While LADOT connects to communities in Los Angeles County, VCTC Intercity offers transits from Newbury Park to coastal cities such as Ventura and Oxnard. Although there are no railway stations in Greater Thousand Oaks, TOT offers daily transfers to Moorpark Metrolink Station.

Newbury Park was home to Rancho Conejo Airport which opened in May 1960 and closed around 1965. The airport was described in the Los Angeles Times as "the finest executive aircraft facility on the West Coast... and will serve the needs of the fast-moving executives of the space-age industries." It was located next to the Rancho Conejo industrial property, northwest of the intersection of North Ventu Park Road and Lawrence Drive. It was near the mouth of Hill Canyon, immediately west of Lynn Ranch.

== Notable people ==
The community is home to celebrities. Examples include swing bandleader and clarinet player Artie Shaw lived in Newbury Park from 1978 until his death in 2004. Comic book author Jack Kirby lived in Newbury Park for at least his last two decades. Carah Faye Charnow of the band Shiny Toy Guns resides in town. The band The Neighbourhood, M. Ward of She & Him, and Belinda Carlisle from The Go-Go's all grew up in Newbury Park. Jordan Cameron played football for Newbury Park High School and went on to be drafted to the NFL by the Cleveland Browns then as a tight end for the Miami Dolphins. Others include Amanda Bynes who went to La Reina High School, Colbie Caillat, Brandon Mull, and Heather Locklear. Football player Jamon Brown of the Los Angeles Rams resides in Dos Vientos in western Newbury Park. Football player Colby Cameron is from Newbury Park, while evangelist George Vandeman lived in the community at the time of his death in 2000. Newbury Park High School has also produced distance runners including Nico Young, Leo Young, Lex Young, and Colin Sahlman. Other notable residents include Olympic water polo silver medalist Merrill Moses, Joe Conley, Craig Saavedra, Andrew Lambo, Will Svitek, Wayne Hooper, Donny Atherton and Marian Mercer.

The soccer player and defender of United States women's national soccer team and Washington Spirit Tara McKeown was born and is originally of Newbury Park.

The soccer goalkeeper of Stanford University from 2018 to 2022 Katie Meyer champion of the NCAA championship in 2019 is also from Newbury Park And studied at Newbury Park Panthers like her teammate from high school Tara McKeown.

== In popular culture ==
Portions of It's a Mad, Mad, Mad, Mad World (1963) were filmed in Newbury Park.

Because of its relatively close proximity to the studios in Hollywood, numerous TV shows and movies were filmed here, including for example Flaming Frontier (1926), Wild Horse (1931), Clearing the Range (1931), Wuthering Heights (1939), Lassie Come Home (1943), Sands of Iwo Jima (1949), The Horse Soldiers (1959), and It's a Mad, Mad, Mad, Mad World (1963). More recent movies filmed here includes Bedtime Stories (2008), Gamers: The Movie (2006), Road to the Open (2014), The Diner (2014), and The Double Born (2008).

Various movies have also been shot in Hidden Valley, which borders the Santa Monica Mountains in southernmost Newbury Park. Some movies shot here include Alvin and the Chipmunks (2007), Commando (1985), The Lone Ranger (1956), Come On, Tarzan (1932), Jagged Edge (1985), The Hand (1981), Spinout (1965), Three Hours to Kill (1954), A Lawless Street (1955), and many more. TV-series with shots filmed here include American Horror Story (2011), Justified (2010), Beverly Hills, 90210 (1992), Columbo (1971), Charmed (1998), and We Bought a Zoo (2011) amongst others.

Many western-style movies were filmed in Wildwood Regional Park, which borders Newbury Park to the north. Some of the movies and TV-series filmed here include Bonanza, Dodge City, Gunsmoke, The Rifleman, Flaming Star, The Big Valley and Wagon Train, as well as films such as Spartacus, Gunsight Ridge, The Grapes of Wrath, and Duel in the Sun.

Belinda Carlisle was a student at Newbury Park High School, and has credited her song California to her life "growing up in Newbury Park and Southern California."

== Points of interest ==
National Park Service trail map of Rancho Sierra Vista

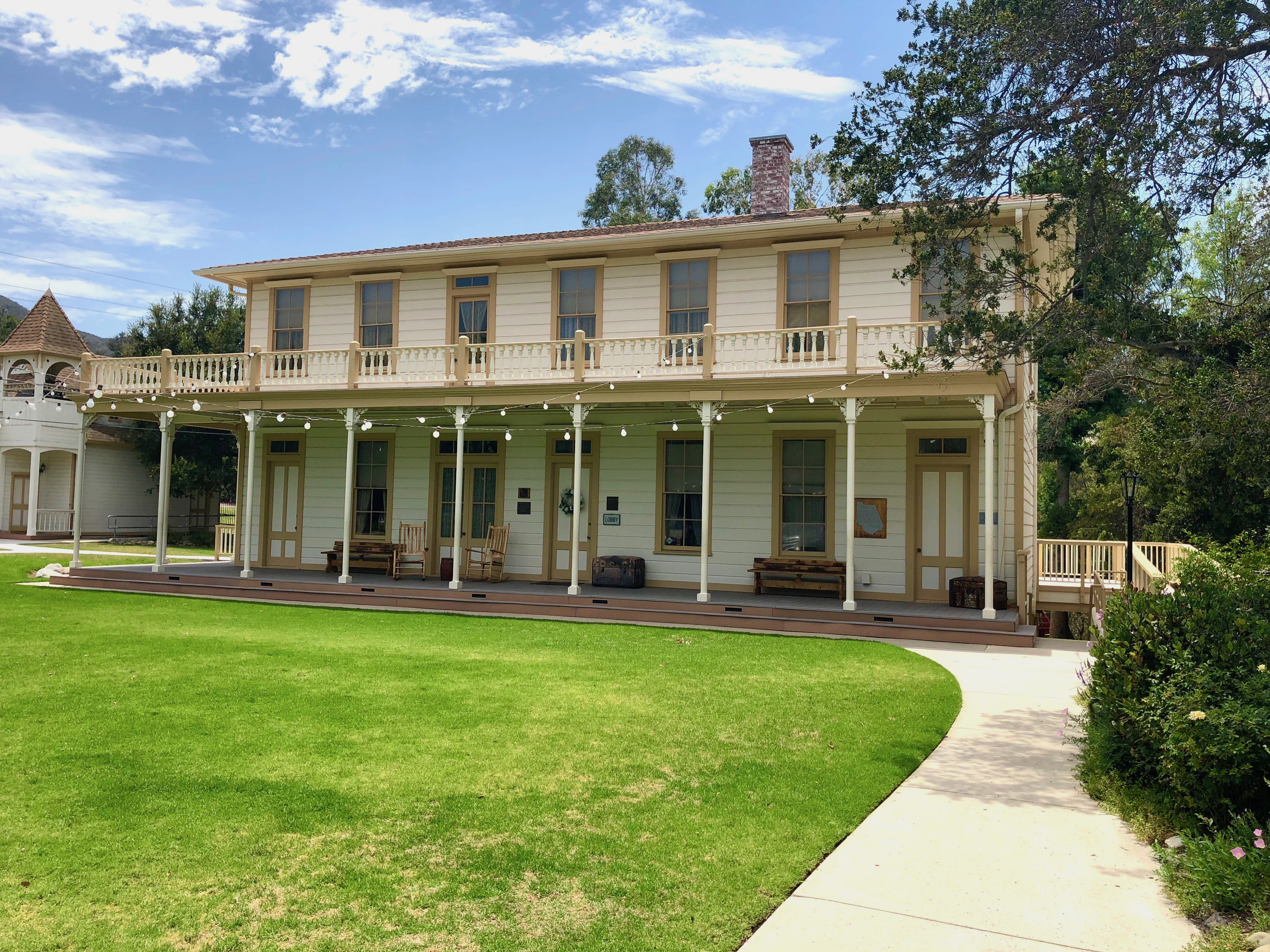
The 1876 Stagecoach Inn is listed on the U.S. National Register of Historic Places.

Places of interest include:

- Boney Mountains State Wilderness Area, areas of Santa Monica Mountains surrounding Mount Boney
- Hope Nature Preserve, nature preserve and gift from actor Bob Hope
- Newbury Park High School Theatre, host of the annual Newbury Park Jazz Festival and other festivals, plays and musicals.
- Newbury Park Library, branch of Grant R. Brimhall Library, home of Thousand Oaks Community Gallery.
- Point Mugu State Park, 14,000-acre (5,700 ha) California State Park offering 60 miles (97 km) of hiking trails.
  - Backbone Trail, long-distance trail connecting Newbury Park to the Pacific Ocean
  - Big Sycamore Canyon, canyon in Point Mugu State Park which cuts through the Santa Monica Mountains.
  - Sycamore Canyon Falls ("Rancho Sierra Vista Falls"), 70 ft (21 m) layered waterfall with series of cascades in Point Mugu State Park.
- Rosewood Trail, hiking trail to the 1,603 ft (489 m) Angel Vista in the Santa Monica Mountains
- Santa Monica Mountains National Recreation Area (SMMNRA), part of Santa Monica Mountains managed by the U.S. National Park Service. It is the world's largest urban national park.
  - Satwiwa Native American Indian Culture Center, Native-American museum at the foothills of Boney Mountain, a sacred mountain to the Chumash Indians.
  - Rancho Sierra Vista, historic ranch area owned by the National Park Service. "Big Sycamore to the Sea" is a relatively easy 8-mile hike from Rancho Sierra Vista to the ocean via Point Mugu State Park.
- Stagecoach Inn, 1876 stagecoach hotel now operating as a museum. On the U.S. National Register of Historic Places. Designated California Historical Landmark #659, Ventura County Landmark #30, and Thousand Oaks City Landmark No. 1.
  - Historic Sycamore Tree, 300-year-old tree at Stagecoach Inn's Tri-Village Complex. Ventura County Landmark #44 and Thousand Oaks Historical Landmark No. 2.
- Timber School, oldest school structure still standing in Conejo Valley. Thousand Oaks City Landmark #12 and Ventura County Landmark No. 166.
- Wildwood Regional Park, 1,765 acres (714 ha) regional park bordering Newbury Park in the north

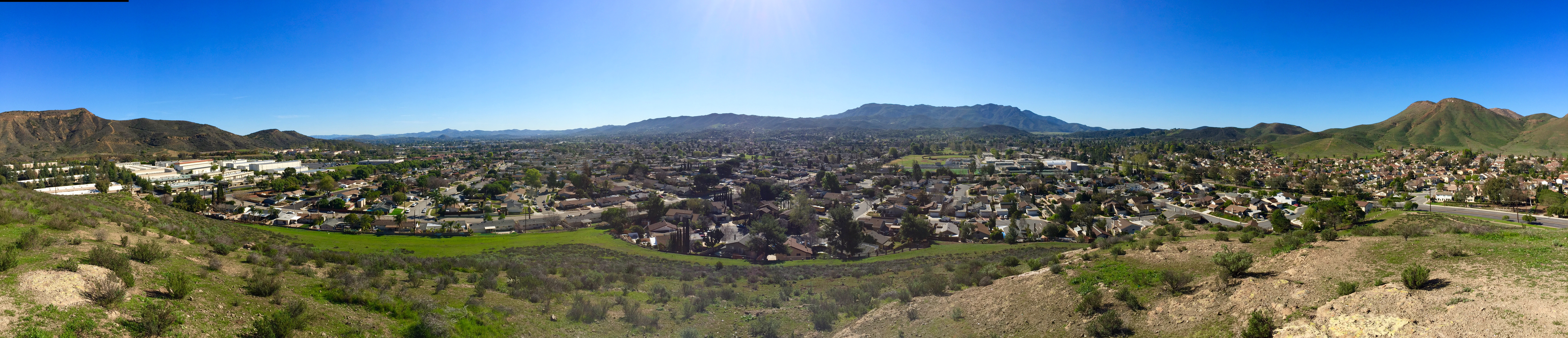
Panoramic view of Newbury Park and the Conejo Valley from Rabbit Hill in Knoll Open Space

== See also ==
- Newbury Park Post Office
- Timber School
