= Casa Conejo, California =

Unincorporated area in Ventura County, California, United States

- Census-designated place
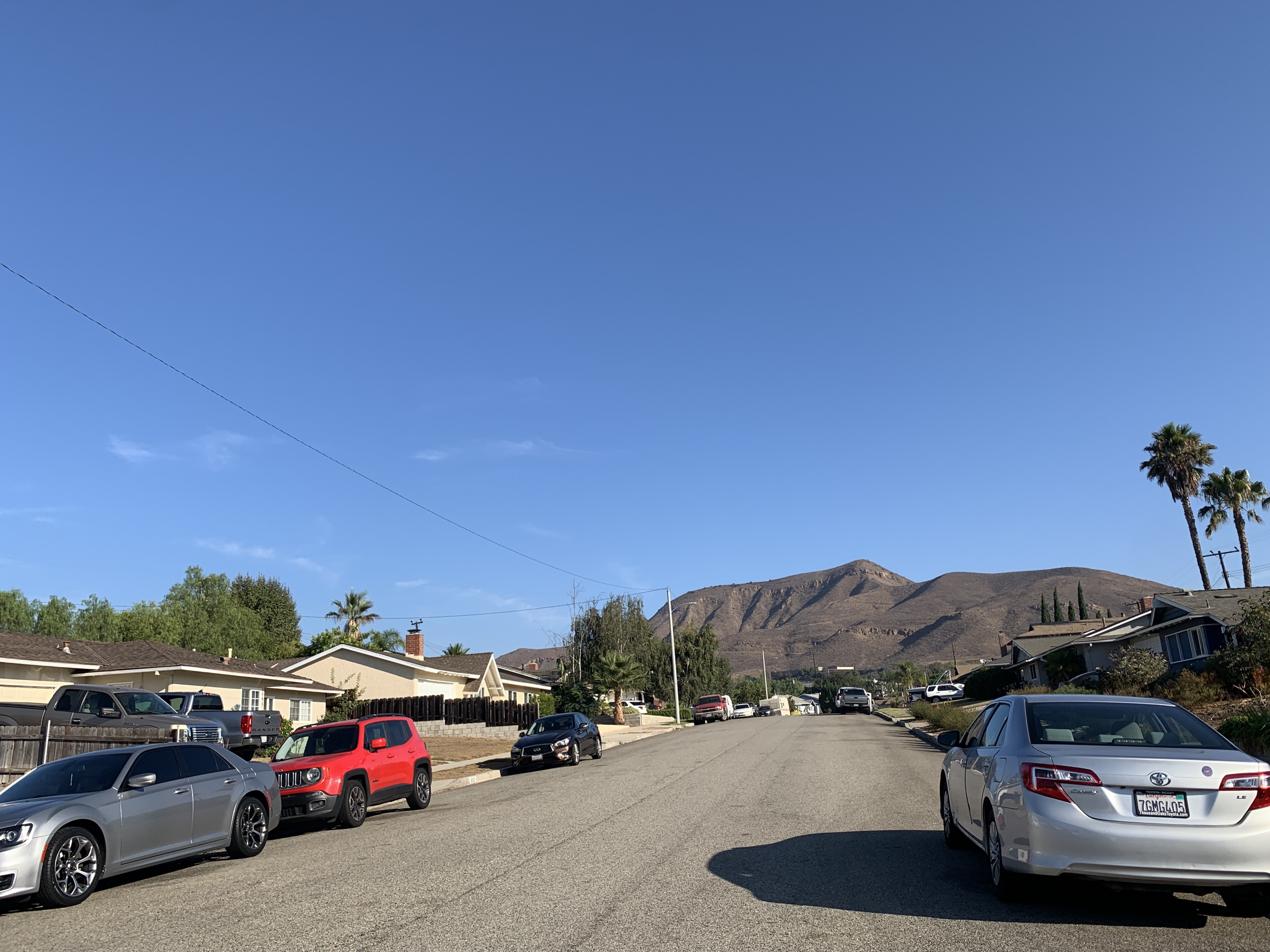
- Casa Conejo, 2021

- Location in Ventura County and the state of California
- Coordinates: 34°11′10″N 118°56′41″W
- Country: United States
- State: California
- County: Ventura
- Founded: 1960; 66 years ago

Government
  - Senate senator: Henry Stern (D)
  - Assemblymember: Jacqui Irwin (D)
  - U. S. rep.: Julia Brownley (D)

Area
  - Total: 0.47 sq mi (1.22 km^{2})
  - Land: 0.47 sq mi (1.22 km^{2})
  - Water: 0 sq mi (0.00 km^{2}) 0%
- Elevation: 653 ft (199 m)

Population (2020)
  - Total: 3,267
  - Density: 6,927.3/sq mi (2,674.64/km^{2})
- Time zone: UTC-8 (PST)
  - Summer (DST): UTC-7 (PDT)
- ZIP code: 91320
- Area code: 805
- FIPS code: 06-11656
- GNIS feature ID: 1867003, 2407978

Casa Conejo (/ˌkɑːsə kəˈneɪoʊ/; Spanish for "Rabbit House") is an unincorporated county island in Newbury Park, Ventura County, California, United States. It was the first planned community in Newbury Park, with construction beginning in 1960. When the city of Thousand Oaks incorporated 4 years later, the new developments in Newbury Park were included within the city boundaries before being subdivided. The community is bordered by Old Conejo Road and US 101 to the north, Borchard Road to the south, Jenny Drive to the west, and Sequoia Middle School to the east. For statistical purposes, the United States Census Bureau defines Casa Conejo as a census-designated place (CDP), though this definition may not exactly correspond to local understanding of the area. The population was 3,267 at the 2020 census, up from 3,249 at the 2010 census. Casa Conejo occupies a roughly rectangular unincorporated area surrounded by the city of Thousand Oaks.

The Casa Conejo Municipal Advisory Council (MAC) serves Casa Conejo residents, by making recommendations to the Board of Supervisors. Its purpose is to provide a forum for residents to discuss local issues and propose ideas to the Board. While numerous other unincorporated islands were annexed by the City of Thousand Oaks during the 1980s, voters in Casa Conejo rejected such efforts, and it remains an unincorporated pocket within Newbury Park. Although Newbury Park is part of Thousand Oaks, Casa Conejo is in Newbury Park but is not part of Thousand Oaks.

== Geography ==
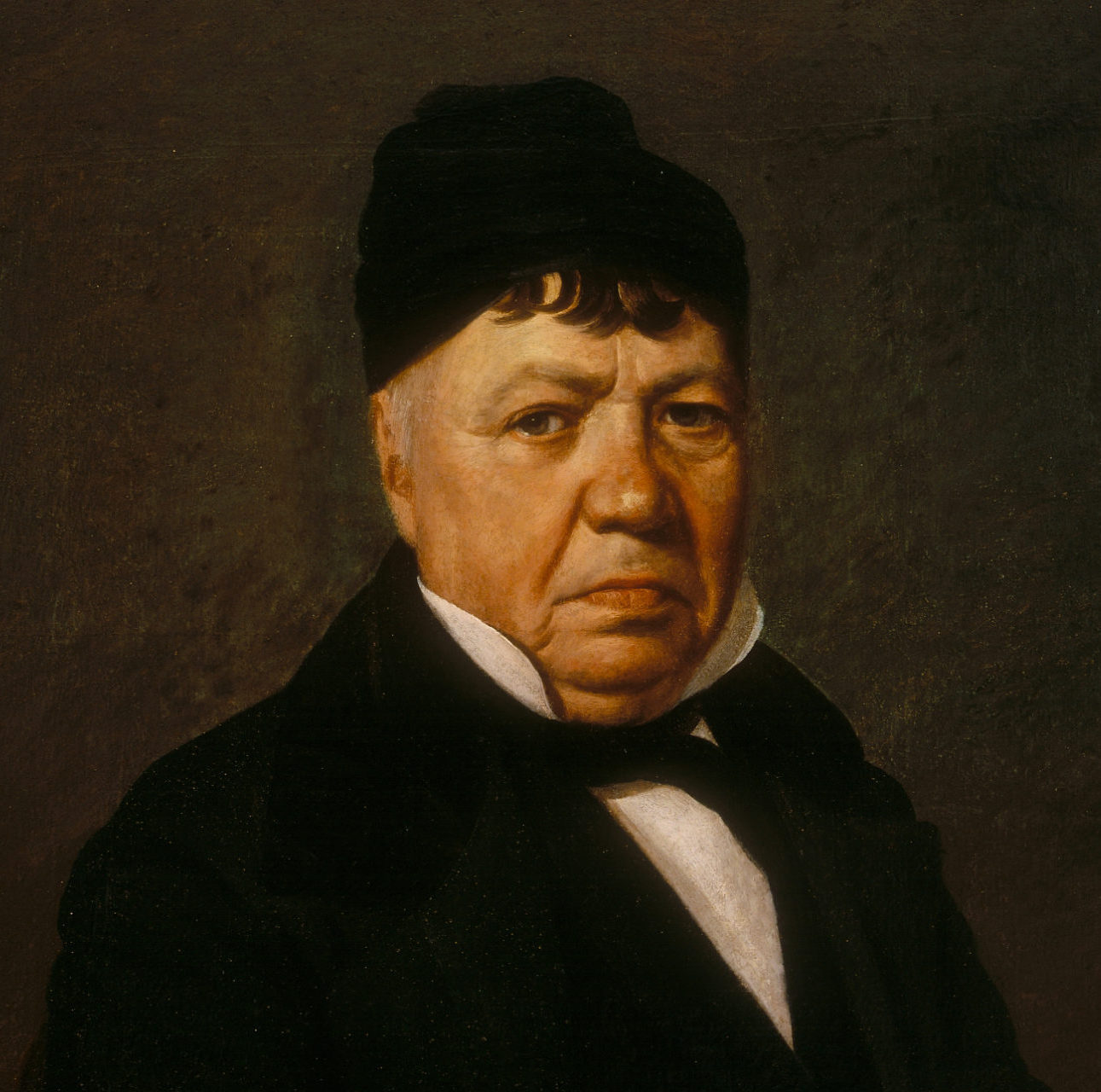
Casa Conejo was part of Rancho El Conejo, owned by Don José de la Guerra y Noriega, founder of the prominent Guerra family of California.

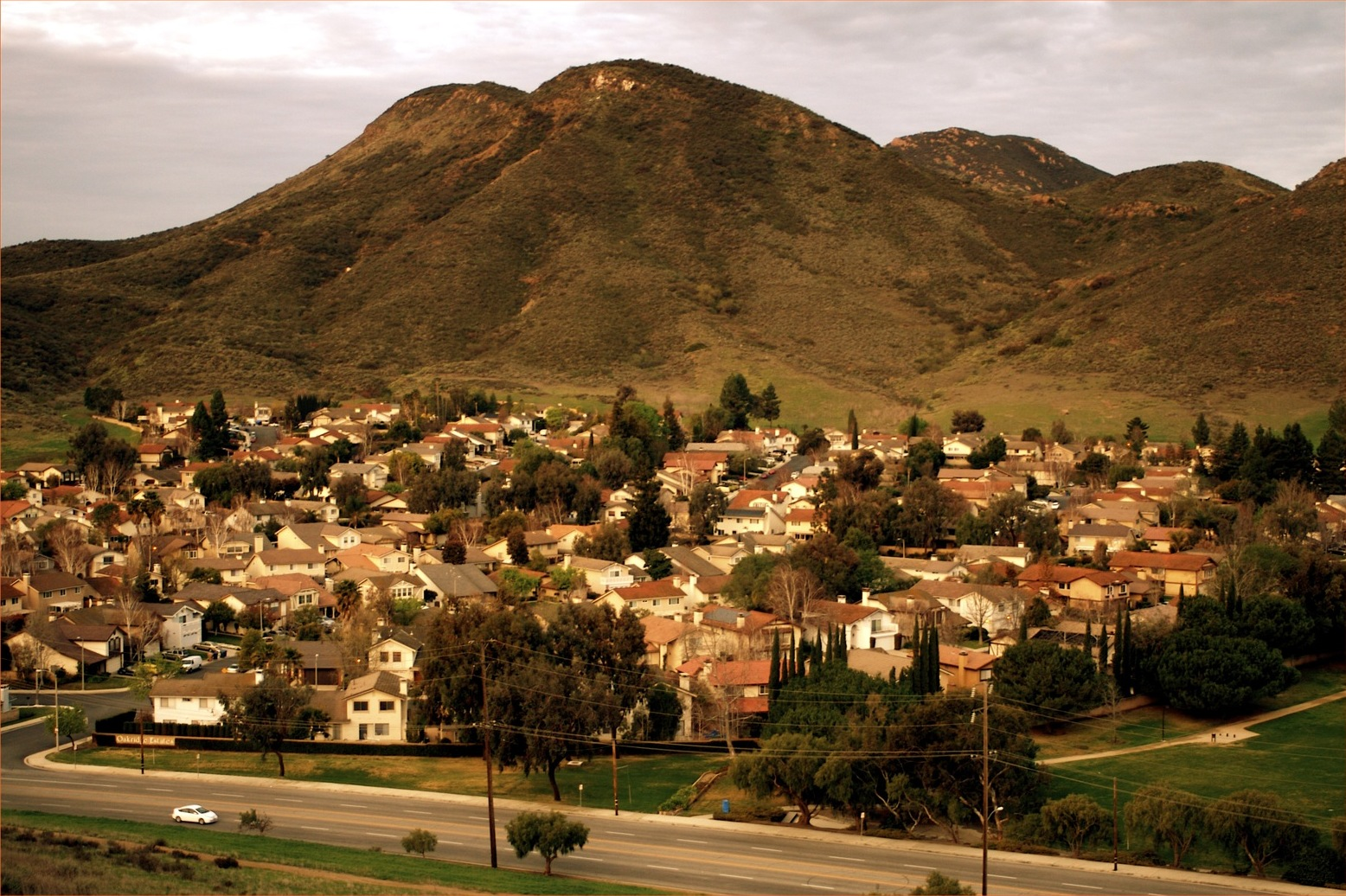
View of the Oakridge Estates neighborhood, an S&S Shapell Inc community, adjacent to Casa Conejo, as seen from Rabbit Hill in Knoll Park.

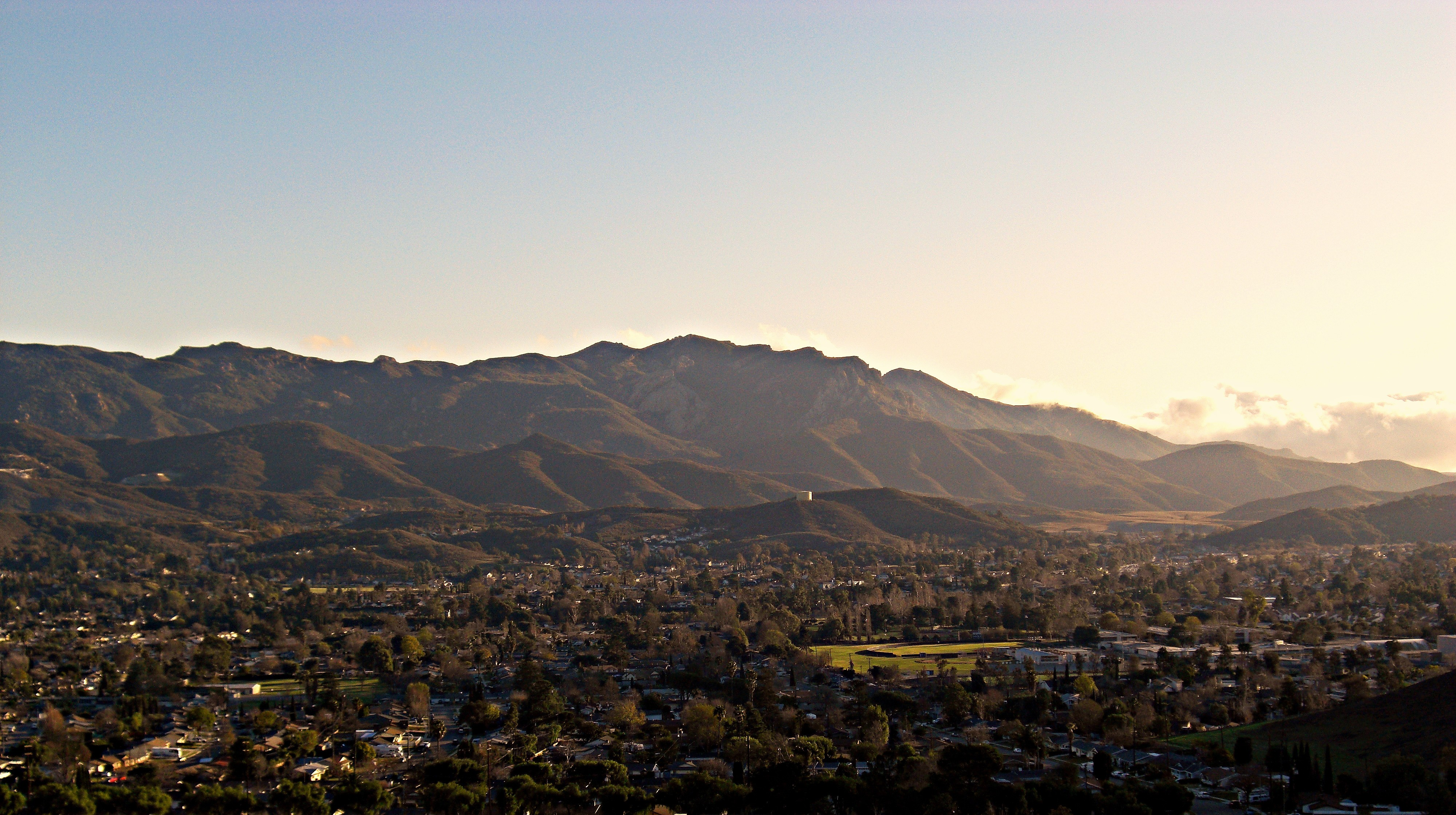
Overlook of Casa Conejo.

Casa Conejo is an unincorporated county island which is surrounded by Newbury Park. The borders of Casa Conejo make its shape more or less a quadrangle. Casa Conejo borders Borchard Road to the south and the Sequoia Middle School to the east. It is bounded by the Old Conejo Road and U.S. 101 Freeway to the north, while it is adjacent to Borchard Community Park, Newbury Park High School and Knoll Park to the east.

Casa Conejo is the oldest planned development in the town of Newbury Park, and is a smaller and more close-knit community than Newbury Park proper. It is often referred to as a neighborhood with a “small town-feel”. While Newbury Park is home to more than 37,700, Casa Conejo is a community of 1,000 homes as of 2016. As of the U.S. Census 2010, the total population of Casa Conejo was 3,249 (8.6% of Newbury Park's total population). The population has been relatively stagnant for decades in Casa Conejo: the U.S. Census of 1990 reported a total population of 3,180, down from 3,286 in 1980.

Conejo Valley's longest creek, Arroyo Conejo, flows westwards and crosses horizontally the southern part of Casa Conejo. A multi-use pathway along the creek has been proposed, which would cross the community and connect the Newbury Park Library and Borchard Community Park. The path would be open for pedestrians, bikers and equestrians, resembling Simi Valley's Arroyo Simi. The waterway is managed by the Ventura County Watershed Protection District, while the Conejo Recreation and Park District (CRPD) would overlook the proposed recreational multipurpose walkway.

== Demographics ==
Historical population
Census	Pop.	Note	%±
1990	3,286		—
2000	3,180		−3.2%
2010	3,249		2.2%
2020	3,267		0.6%
U.S. Decennial Census; 1850–1870 1880-1890; 1900 1910 1920; 1930 1940 1950; 1960 1970 1980; 1990 2000 2010

Casa Conejo first appeared as a census designated place in the 1990 U.S. census.

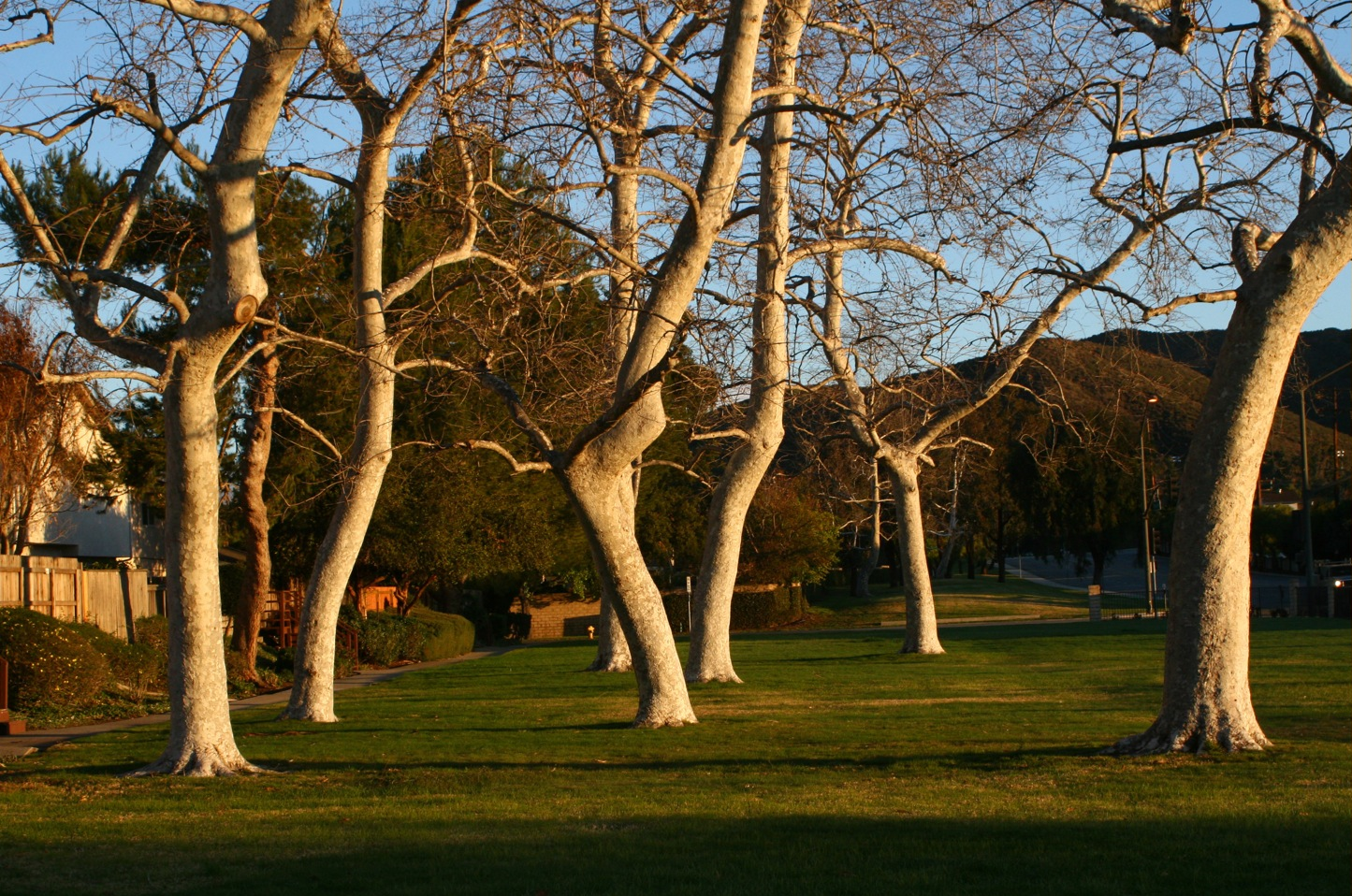
Trees in Borchard Community Park.

=== 2020 census ===
As of the 2020 census, Casa Conejo had a population of 3,267. The population density was 6,921.6 inhabitants per square mile (2,672.4/km^{2}).

The census reported that 99.7% of the population lived in households, 0.3% lived in non-institutionalized group quarters, and no one was institutionalized. 100.0% of residents lived in urban areas, while 0.0% lived in rural areas.

There were 1,035 households, out of which 39.9% included children under the age of 18, 58.1% were married-couple households, 6.2% were cohabiting couple households, 20.4% had a female householder with no spouse or partner present, and 15.4% had a male householder with no spouse or partner present. About 15.3% of households were one-person households, and 8.8% had one person aged 65 or older. The average household size was 3.15. There were 822 families (79.4% of all households).

The age distribution was 23.0% under the age of 18, 8.4% aged 18 to 24, 26.0% aged 25 to 44, 27.5% aged 45 to 64, and 15.1% who were 65 years of age or older. The median age was 39.2 years. For every 100 females, there were 101.4 males, and for every 100 females age 18 and over, there were 100.4 males.

There were 1,045 housing units at an average density of 2,214.0 units per square mile (854.8 units/km^{2}), of which 1,035 (99.0%) were occupied. Of occupied units, 78.3% were owner-occupied and 21.7% were occupied by renters. Of all housing units, 1.0% were vacant. The homeowner vacancy rate was 0.0% and the rental vacancy rate was 2.2%.

Racial composition as of the 2020 census
Race	Number	Percent
White	2,045	62.6%
Black or African American	16	0.5%
American Indian and Alaska Native	22	0.7%
Asian	199	6.1%
Native Hawaiian and Other Pacific Islander	3	0.1%
Some other race	352	10.8%
Two or more races	630	19.3%
Hispanic or Latino (of any race)	976	29.9%

=== Income and poverty ===
In 2023, the US Census Bureau estimated that the median household income was $142,708, and the per capita income was $43,840. About 1.4% of families and 2.7% of the population were below the poverty line.

=== 2010 census ===
The 2010 United States census reported that Casa Conejo had a population of 3,249. The population density was 6,836.5 inhabitants per square mile (2,639.6/km^{2}). The racial makeup of Casa Conejo was 2,560 (78.8%) White, 27 (0.8%) African American, 20 (0.6%) Native American, 160 (4.9%) Asian, 4 (0.1%) Pacific Islander, 327 (10.1%) from other races, and 151 (4.6%) from two or more races. Hispanic or Latino of any race were 851 persons (26.2%).

The Census reported that 3,243 people (99.8% of the population) lived in households, 6 (0.2%) lived in non-institutionalized group quarters, and 0 (0%) were institutionalized.

There were 990 households, out of which 431 (43.5%) had children under the age of 18 living in them, 627 (63.3%) were opposite-sex married couples living together, 110 (11.1%) had a female householder with no husband present, 63 (6.4%) had a male householder with no wife present There were 54 (5.5%) unmarried opposite-sex partnerships, and 6 (0.6%) same-sex married couples or partnerships. 122 households (12.3%) were made up of individuals, and 68 (6.9%) had someone living alone who was 65 years of age or older. The average household size was 3.28. There were 800 families (80.8% of all households); the average family size was 3.47.

The population was spread out, with 819 people (25.2%) under the age of 18, 285 people (8.8%) aged 18 to 24, 884 people (27.2%) aged 25 to 44, 887 people (27.3%) aged 45 to 64, and 374 people (11.5%) who were 65 years of age or older The median age was 38.4 years. For every 100 females there were 103.3 males. For every 100 females age 18 and over, there were 102.8 males.

There were 1,010 housing units at an average density of 2,125.2 per square mile (820.5/km^{2}), of which 818 (82.6%) were owner-occupied, and 172 (17.4%) were occupied by renters. The homeowner vacancy rate was 0.8%; the rental vacancy rate was 2.3 2,577 people (79.3% of the population) lived in owner-occupied housing units and 666 people (20.5%) lived in rental housing units.

== Education ==
Casa Conejo is served by the Conejo Valley Unified School District.

== See also ==
- Ventu Park
- Dos Vientos

== Notable people ==
- Linda Parks, politician
