= Rabbit Hill (Newbury Park) =

Coordinates: 34°11′24″N 118°57′8″W

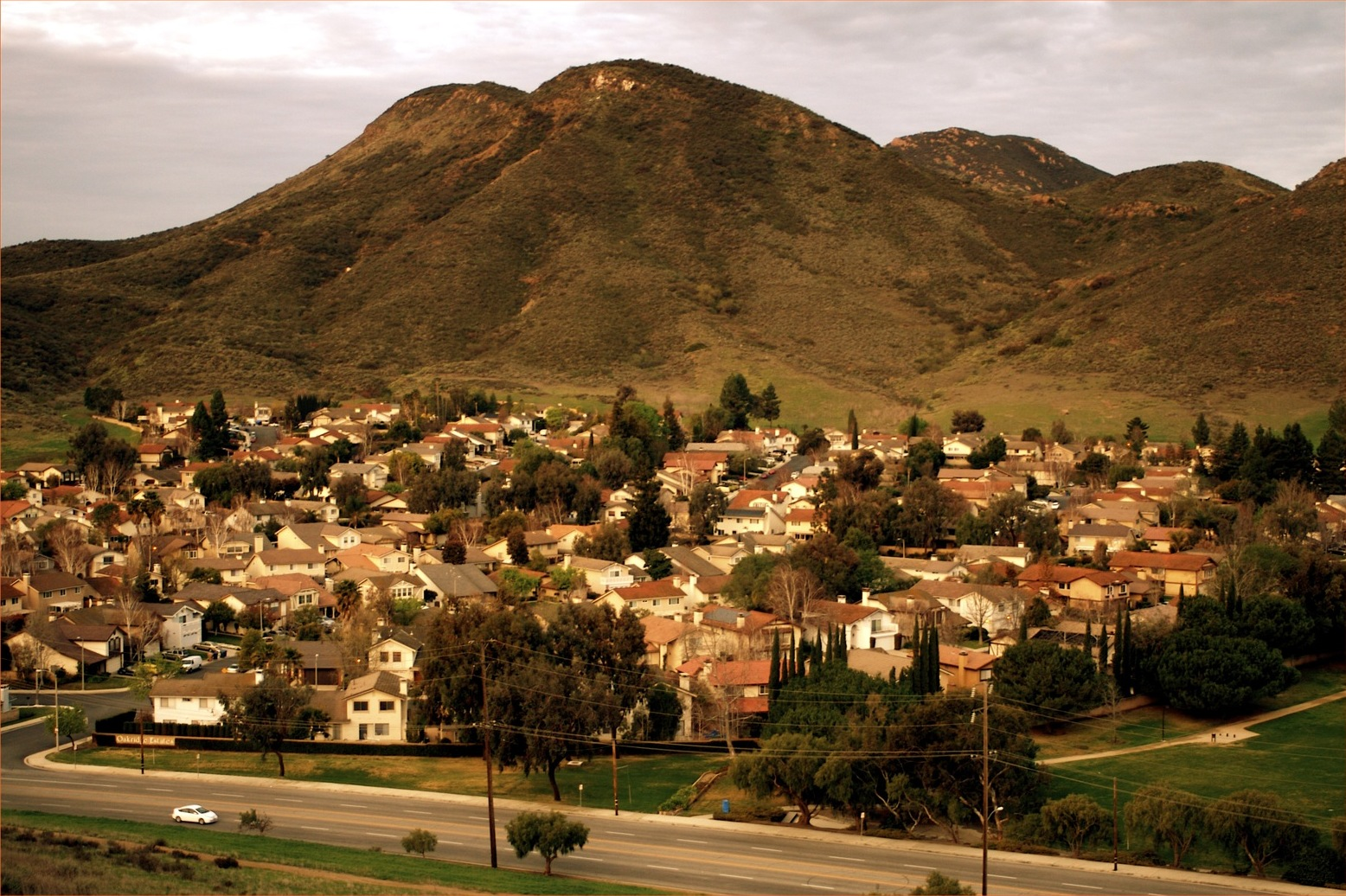
View of Casa Conejo, California with the Santa Monica Mountains in the back as seen from the top of Rabbit Hill

Rabbit Hill, also referred to as Knoll Hill, is a 797-foot-high (243 m) hill located in Knoll Park (also known as Knoll Open Space), which is among the highest peaks in Newbury Park, California that are not parts of the Santa Monica Mountains. It is reached from a trailhead on North Reino Road, just across the road from the Pepper Tree Playfields, which provides hikers to Rabbit Hill with parking spaces. The sloping Knoll Trail (Pepper Tree Vista Trail) goes from N. Reino Rd. to the top of the knoll, which offers panoramic views of Newbury Park, Casa Conejo, Boney Mountain, Thousand Oaks and Conejo Mountain. The total park area is 21 acres (8.5 ha) including the hill, which is covered with coastal sage scrub and grassland.
