= Thousand Oaks Community Gallery =

Public art gallery in United States

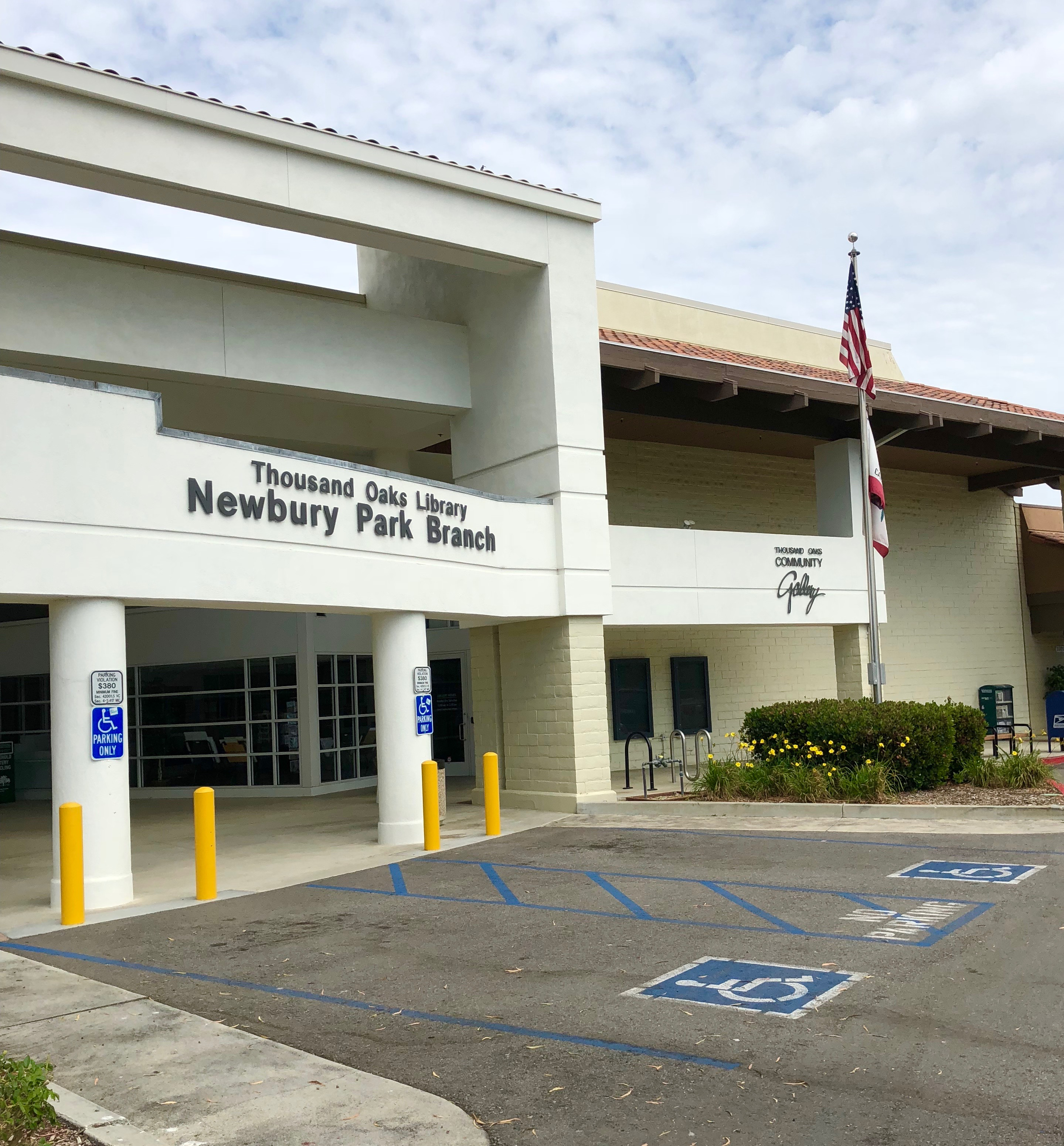
- Established: February 1991
- Location: 2331-A Borchard Road, Newbury Park, CA
- Coordinates: 34°10′55″N 118°55′44″W
- Director: Lorene Duffy
- Public transit access: Thousand Oaks Transit (TOT)
- Website: Official website

Thousand Oaks Community Gallery is a public art gallery located adjacent to Newbury Park Library in Newbury Park, California. The gallery was established in February 1991, and features a variety of workshops, visual arts exhibitions, photography, paintings, artist presentations and events. The 3,000 sq. ft. gallery is one of Conejo Valley’s primary visual arts facilities. It was established by City of Thousand Oaks in cooperation with local art organizations and dedicated residents. Besides showcasing the work of acclaimed and professional artists, the gallery also presents locally based artists and art contests.

The gallery is operated under the direction of city staff and a steering committee, which consists of regional visual arts representatives and arts leaders. Original art can be purchased at the gallery, and its facilities can also be rented for special events. It is situated south of the 101 Freeway at the Borchard Road freeway exit, adjacent to Newbury Park Branch Library.

== See also ==
- Conejo Valley Art Museum
