= Grant R. Brimhall Library =

Library in Thousand Oaks, California

Coordinates: 34.198528°N 118.84675°W

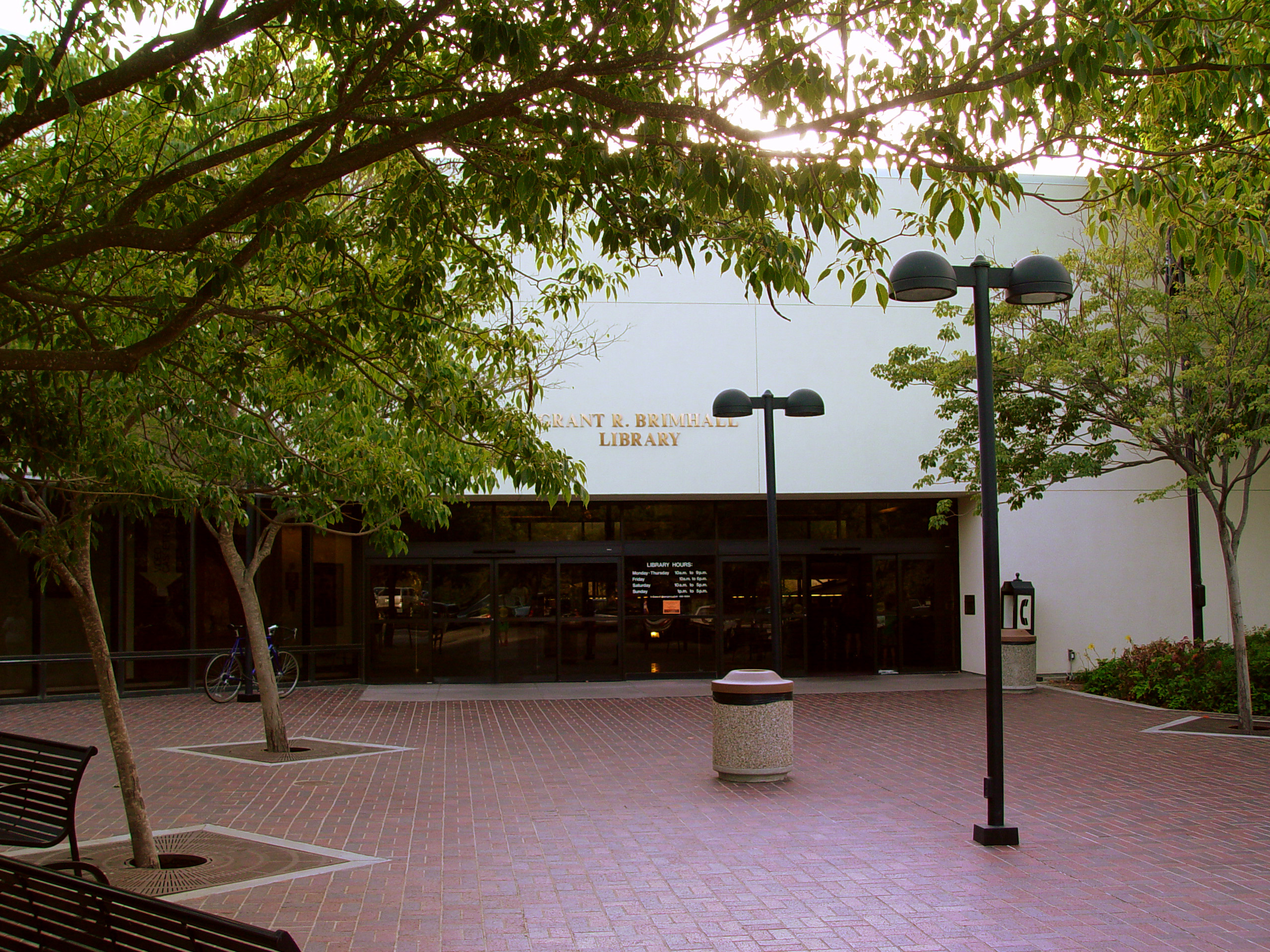
Main entrance, Grant R. Brimhall Library

The Grant R. Brimhall Library serves as the main library for the city of Thousand Oaks, California. It is controlled by the Thousand Oaks Library System, which also controls the Newbury Park Branch Library. The Grant R. Brimhall Building is located on Janss Rd. near State Route 23. There are 81,000 square feet (7,500 m^{2}) in the main building and 3,000 square feet (280 m^{2}) in the adjacent Special Collections Storage building. It serves Thousand Oaks, including Newbury Park and Westlake Village. It is the largest library in Ventura County, the largest library in the region, and one of the largest in Southern California.

American Radio Archive was part of the Special Collections Department at the library, and featured one of the largest collections of broadcasting documents in the United States, or perhaps in the world. It had a collection of 23,000 radio- and TV scripts, 10,000 photographs, and 10,000 books related to the history of radio. Furthermore, it contained archives of notable individuals such as Bob Crosby, Rudy Vallee, Norman Corwin, and Monty Masters.

== History ==
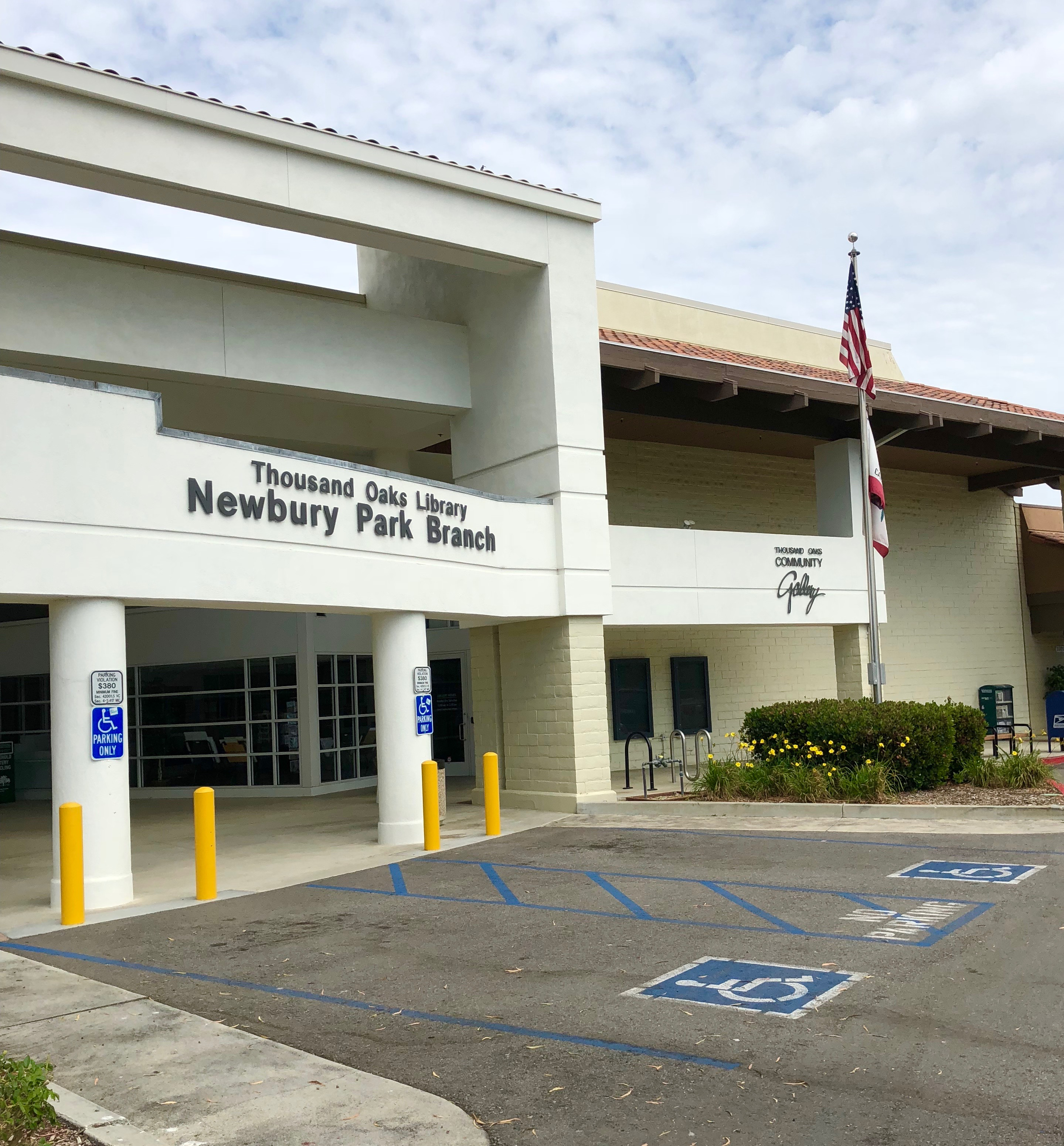
The Newbury Park Branch Library was established in 1991.

The Thousand Oaks City Council established the Thousand Oaks Library, which was dedicated on January 25, 1982. Previously, library services had been provided by the Ventura County Library Services Agency operating from a branch on Wilbur Road. The new city structure provided the community with a 59,000 sq. ft. building. It has an interior fountain and a sculpture of J.B. Blunk, which was the city's first major purchase of artwork. The land is owned by Conejo Recreation and Park District, which leases the property to the city for a 98-year lease. A.C. Martin and Associates was the library designers, and the original 54,000 sq. ft. building was built at a cost of $8 million, much of it which had been donated. The City of Thousand Oaks made a $4.5 million down payment. A reception was held on January 22, 1982, where 385 people attended and donated over $75,000. Hundreds more turned out the following day for the public dedication. On day one, around 4,300 books were loaned, $1,000 was donated to the book fund, and 500 new library cards were issued. The library opened with a collection of 200,000 books, however, was expected to reach 300,000 by 1990. From 1986 to 1987 the library circulated over 1.2 million items, a 97% increase since its opening in 1982–83. As of 1989, the library was visited by 2,500 people on a daily basis.

The library was originally located on Wilbur Road, across from where the Janss Marketplace parking structure stands today. Today, the original building has been remodeled and is used for art work. The Thousand Oaks Library occupies its new building, at 1401 E. Janss Rd. in January 1982, which was later named the Grant R. Brimhall Library in honor of the former City Manager. Before 1982, the library was part of the Ventura County Library Services Agency. In November 1982, the City of Thousand Oaks assumed responsibility for library operations.

The Newbury Park Branch of the library opened in January 1991 at 2331 Borchard Rd. The library encompasses 17,000 square feet (1,600 m^{2}). The building includes an additional 4,000 square feet (370 m^{2}) which house the Friends of the Thousand Oaks Library work area. Newbury Park Library is also home of Thousand Oaks Community Gallery.

== Architecture ==
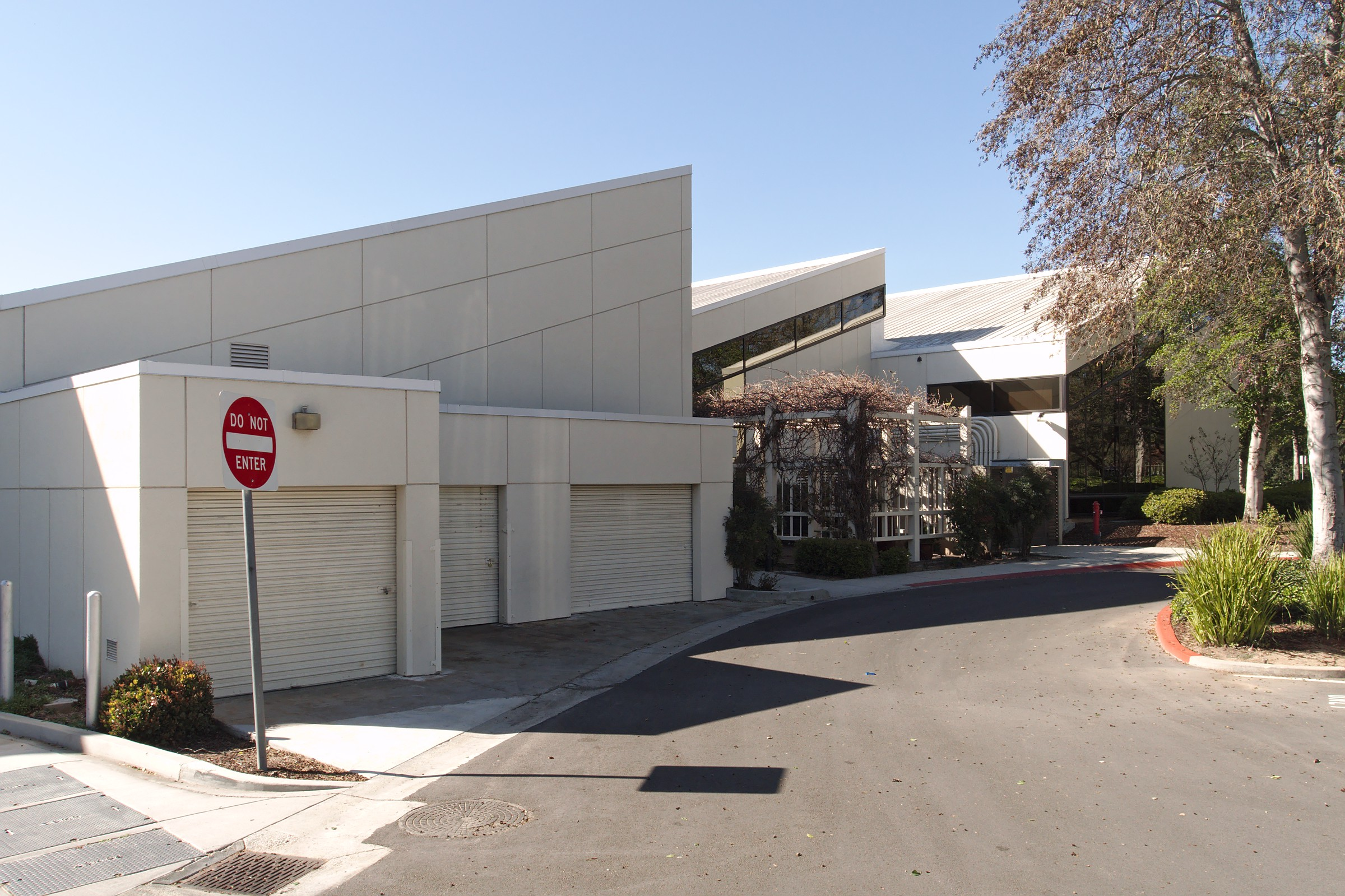
View from east lot, showing iconic sawtooth profile

A.C. Martin and Associates Architecture firm located in Los Angeles was the designer responsible for the new library. It shares similar architecture to the original Thousand Oaks City Hall, which is located off Lynn Rd. across from The Oaks Shopping Center, and with the Thousand Oaks Civic Arts Center and present city hall located on Thousand Oaks Boulevard. The style is very clean and futuristic, with straight lines throughout. It is noted by local residents as being one of the most appealing buildings in the area because of its unique architecture, which was ahead of its time.

== Relocation and return ==
For many years, the library was not located at the main Grant R. Brimhall Building. It moved to a large commercial building off Conejo School Road. In 1994, the Thousand Oaks Library was damaged by the Northridge earthquake and was temporarily relocated to 2400 Willow Lane to allow reconstruction to proceed rapidly. The Grant R. Brimhall Library re-opened at the Janss Road site in November 1996. The building began to have problems with the roof in the late 1980s and early 1990s. Damage occurred inside the library due to leaking, which sent the city and original developer into a lawsuit that took years to conclude. Until the lawsuit concluded and the building could be repaired correctly, the library was moved to the Conejo School Road location, across the US 101 freeway from the present day Thousand Oaks Civic Arts Plaza.

== Thousand Oaks Library System ==
There are approximately 380,000 items in the collection, including books, magazines, newspapers, recorded books on CD and digital formats, DVDs, CD-ROMs and music CDs. New materials are ordered daily by the library. The library system no longer uses the card catalog system, but rather a computer database system to store all library information. The library system also offers large meeting rooms and auditoriums at both library locations, and the Conejo Valley Art Exhibition at the Newbury Park Branch, which is constantly running and previewing local artists' work.

The American Radio Archive was one of the special collections of the Thousand Oaks Library Foundation. Other collections include local history and the art and history of the book. The American Radio Archives and Museum contained one of the largest collections of radio broadcasting in the United States. The library is home to a local history collection that has more than 1,800 books and pamphlets, from approximately 1875 to the present. The collection also includes extensive subject files, biographical files, maps, oral histories, photographs, and other materials.

=== Newbury Park Library ===
Newbury Park Library opened in January 1991 on Borchard Road in Newbury Park, California, directly across from Newbury Gateway Park. It is adjacent to Thousand Oaks Community Gallery and home of the 4,000 sq. ft. Friends of the Thousand Oaks Library work area. The 31,000 sq. ft. library is a branch of the Thousand Oaks Library and is located in a former Ralphs supermarket. It was finished in 1991 at a cost of $4 million, and opened with a collection of 18,000 volumes and a small collection of video and audiotapes. The library houses various genealogical items of the Conejo Valley Genealogical Society.

== Expansion ==
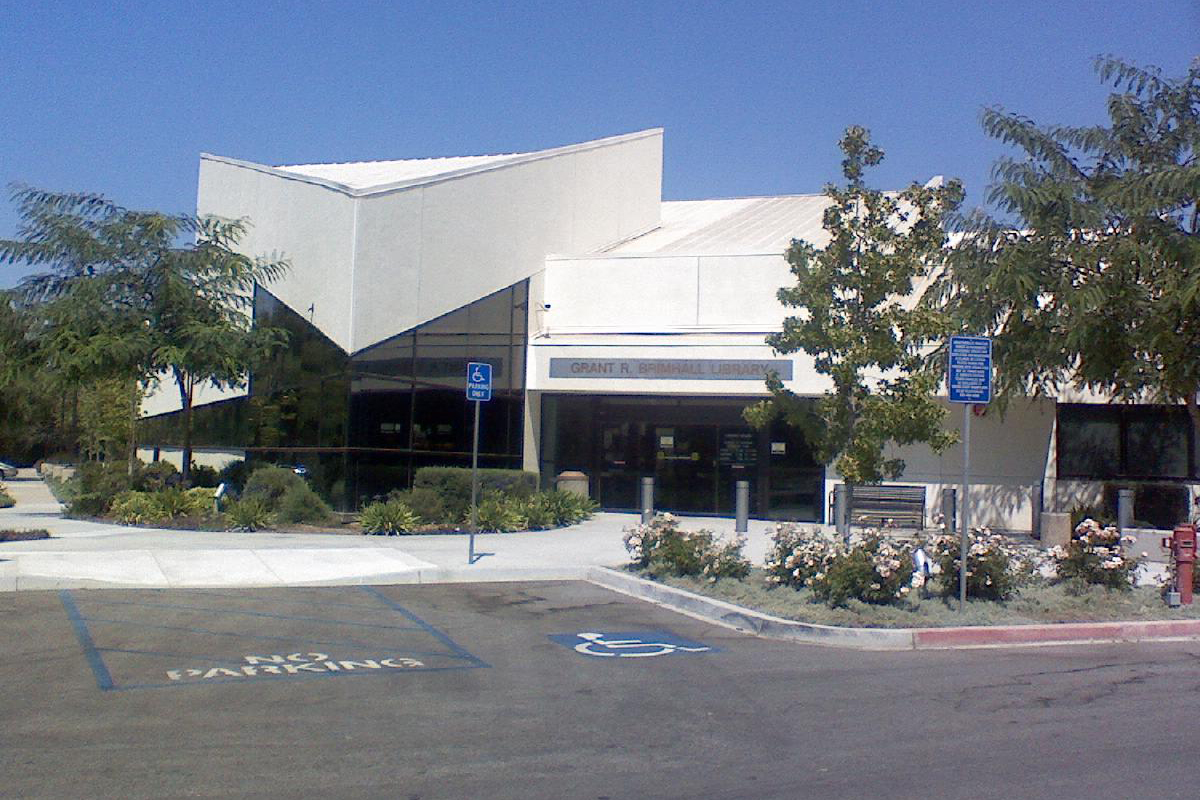
Entrance to the children's wing

The Grant R. Brimhall Library recently finished a children's wing expansion project. The library expansion project includes a 22,000-square-foot (2,000 m^{2}) expansion of the Grant R. Brimhall Library. The project adds onto the south side of the building and is devoted to children's services and collections. Additional staff work area is also included in this project. The new Children's Library entrance is facing Janss Road, with additional parking, a drive-up book drop, a courtyard, 3700 gallon saltwater aquarium and children's patio. It also offers a separate program room, additional shelving for the juvenile collection, and extra study and seating area for children. The existing facility was renovated and modified to include a new location for the library Foundation Store, the Special Collections Department, as well as new quiet and group study rooms, additional seating and shelving.

It was designed by Killefer, Flammang Architects located in Santa Monica, and constructed by AKG Construction, Inc., based in Van Nuys. It took approximately 18 months to complete from its start date, November 17, 2004. Total cost added up to $10.5 million.
