= Knoll Open Space =

21 acres (8.5 ha) open-space area in western Newbury Park, California

Knoll Open Space Knoll Park
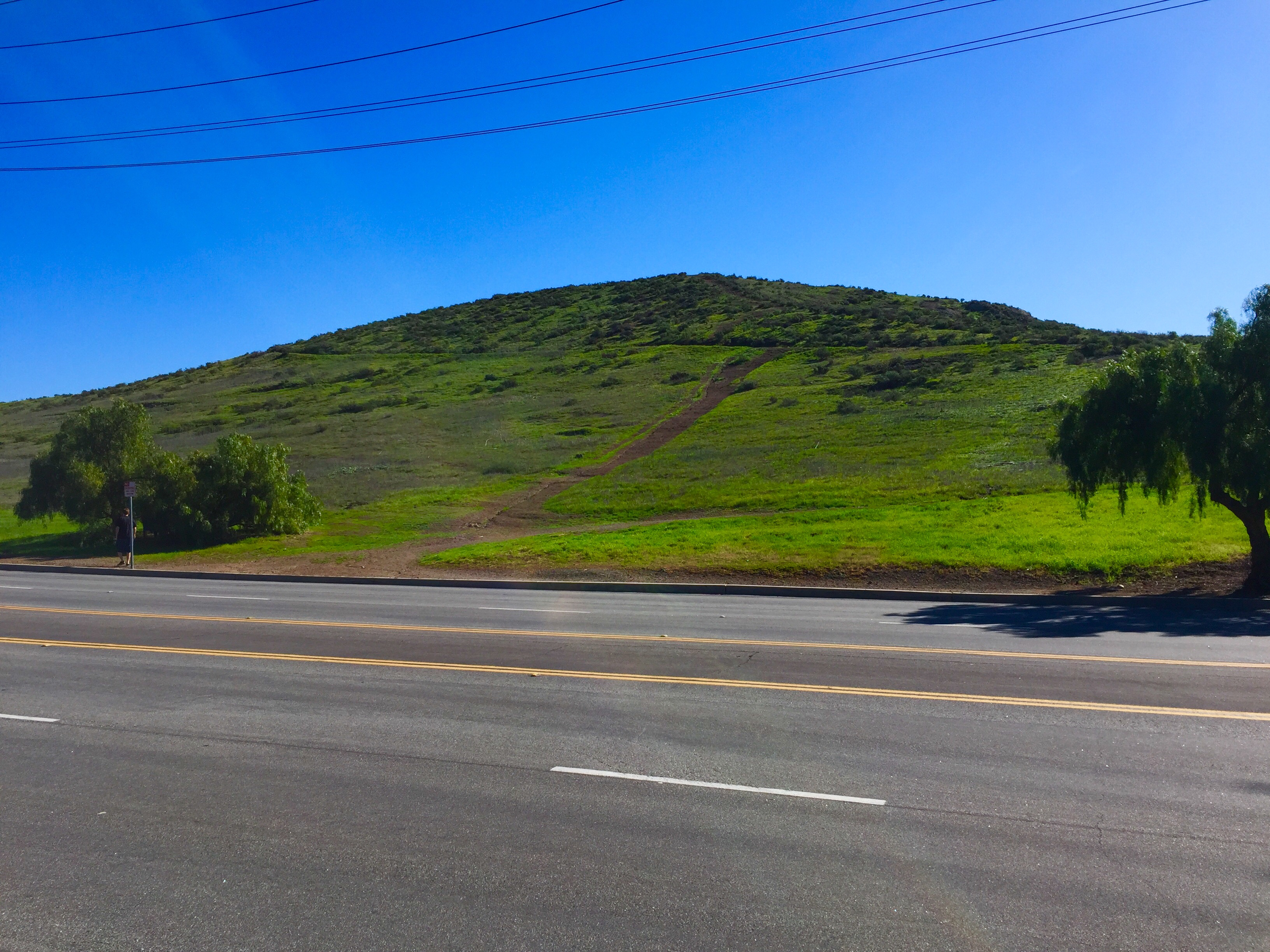
- Knoll Open Space as seen from Pepper Tree Playfield.
- Interactive map of Knoll Open Space; Knoll Park
- Type: Open-space park
- Location: Newbury Park, CA
- Coordinates: 34°11′26″N 118°57′8″W
- Area: 21 acres (8.5 ha)
- Operator: Conejo Open Space Conservation Agency (COSCA)
- Status: Open

Knoll Open Space, also known as Knoll Park, is a 21 acres (8.5 ha) open-space area in western Newbury Park, California, United States, adjacent to Pepper Tree Playfield. The Knoll Open Space is owned and operated by the Conejo Open Space Conservation Agency (COSCA), and the flora here includes coastal sage scrub and grass. The 1.9 miles (3.1 km) Knoll Trail (Pepper Tree Vista Trail) goes from its trailhead at North Reino Road and leads to the top of Rabbit Hill (Knoll Hill). The hill offers panoramic views of the Conejo Valley, Santa Monica Mountains, Conejo Mountain, and Boney Mountain.
