= Dos Vientos, Thousand Oaks, California =

Neighborhood of Thousand Oaks, California, United States

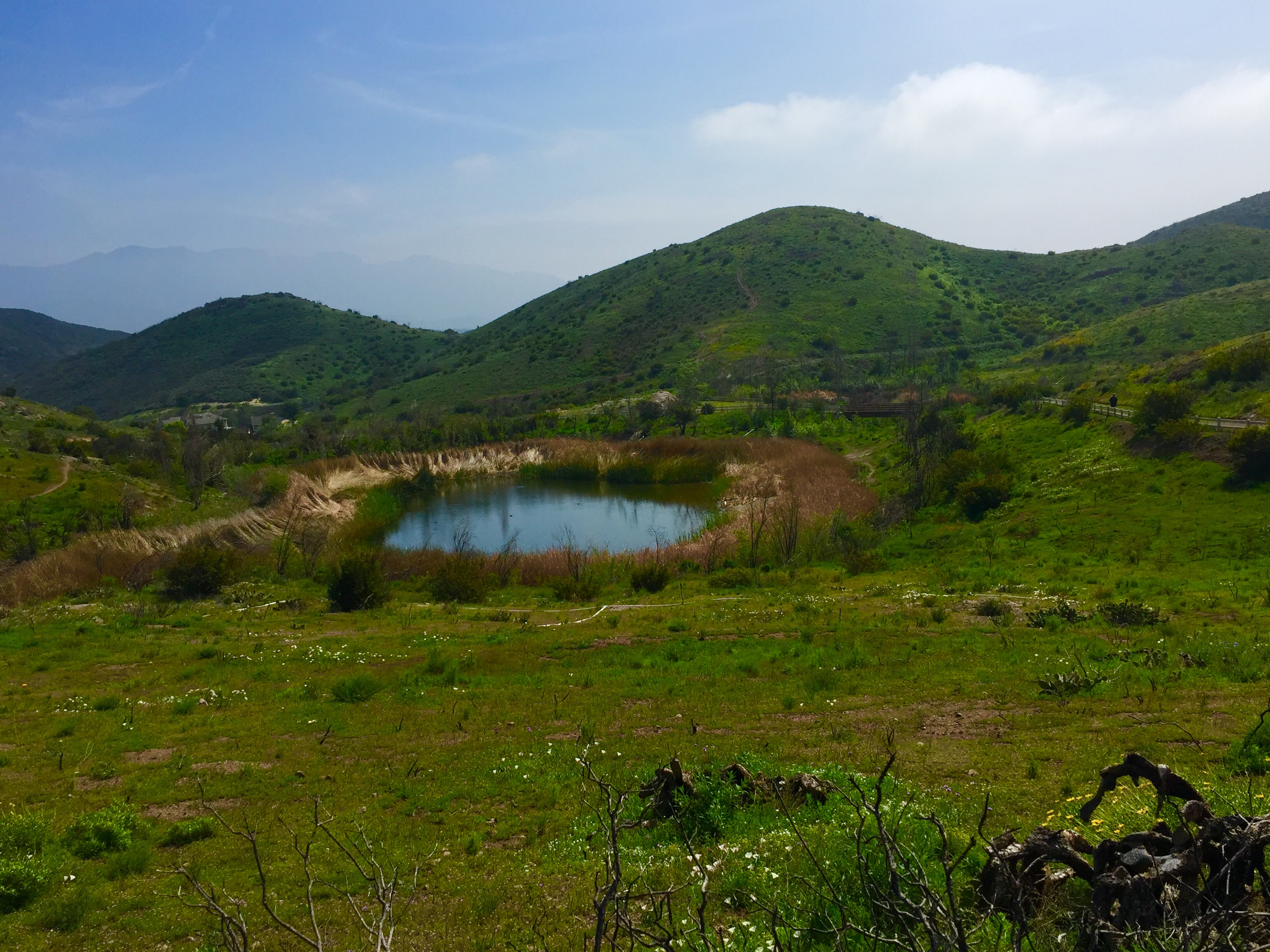
Twin Ponds by Dos Vientos Ranch.

Dos Vientos is a neighborhood of Thousand Oaks, California in westernmost portion of Newbury Park. Bordering Dos Vientos Open Space and the Santa Monica Mountains, it was a 2,350-unit housing development which was approved by the Thousand Oaks City Council in April 1988. It is an upscale and master-planned community. Major development found place after infrastructure was built to support the homes in 1998. It was the largest residential project ever within Newbury Park. It has a maximum elevation of 2,500 feet.

Wildfires led to temporary evacuation of homes in 2013 and 2018.

== Historic designation ==
Two large barns on the Dos Vientos Ranch became designated Ventura County Historical Landmark No. 99 in 1986. The barns are also City of Thousand Oaks Landmark No. 6. The land where the barns lie was once part of Rancho Guadalasca, which along with Rancho Conejo made up most of the Conejo Valley. It was part of an 8,000-acre farm bought by Joseph Lewis in 1906. Lewis is credited for introducing the lima bean to California and establishing the Ventura County lima bean industry. Lewis was one of the farmers responsible for Ventura County gaining its former distinction “Lima Bean Capital of the World.”

However, Lewis fell into financial difficulties during the Great Depression, and the Dos Vientos Ranch was purchased by Malcolm Clark, the designer of Snap-on Tools and Henry Ford’s former tool and die maker. The barns, both erected in the 1930s, were part of a former stable complex. The barns were dismantled in the 1990s during the construction of the Dos Vientos residential development. They were the only remains left of Malcolm Clark's ranch property. The lumber was cataloged and stored with the Conejo Recreation and Park District with plans to rebuild and restore the buildings at another site. In the years since, the condition (as well as partial theft) of the materials made those plans impossible. Part of the materials was repurposed to build a blacksmith's shop at the nearby Stagecoach Inn Museum

== See also ==
- Dos Vientos Community Park
