= Conejo Recreation and Park District =

Park management agency in Thousand Oaks, California

Coordinates: 34.18666°N 118.88459°W

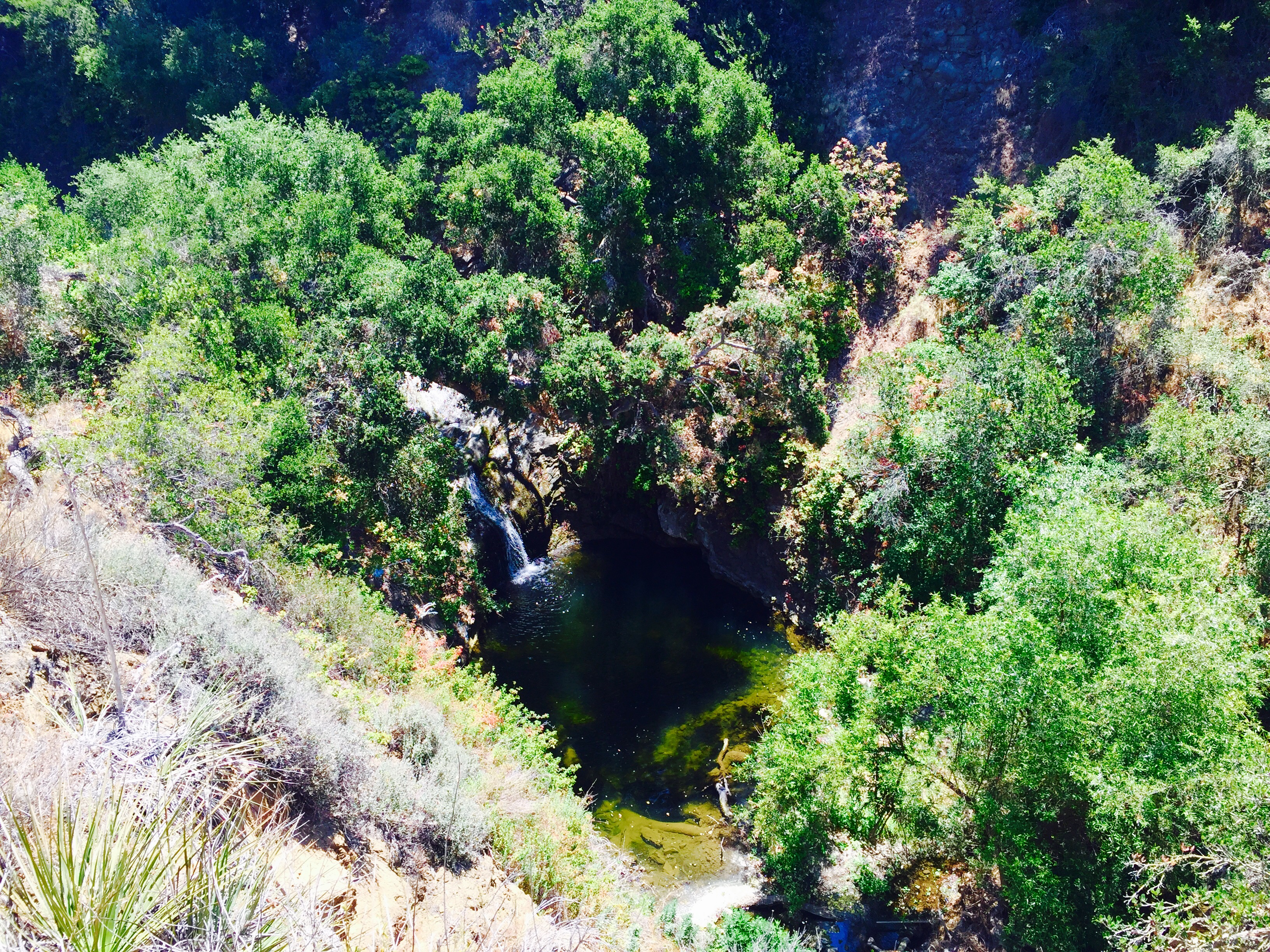
Waterfall in Wildwood Regional Park

Conejo Recreation and Park District (CRPD) is the park management agency for most of the parks in the Conejo Valley, California. Established in 1962, CRPD later established Conejo Open Space Conservation Agency (COSCA) in 1977 through a joint effort with the City of Thousand Oaks. COSCA administers over 15,000 acres of open space and 140 miles of trails, while CRPD administers over 50 community parks. In 2019, CRPD's annual operating budget was $20 million, of which about 70% comes from property taxes.

It was previously headquartered in the historic 1910 Crowley House, which is City of Thousand Oaks Historical Landmark No. 7. However, CRPD is now housed near Hillcrest Center for the Arts.

== History ==
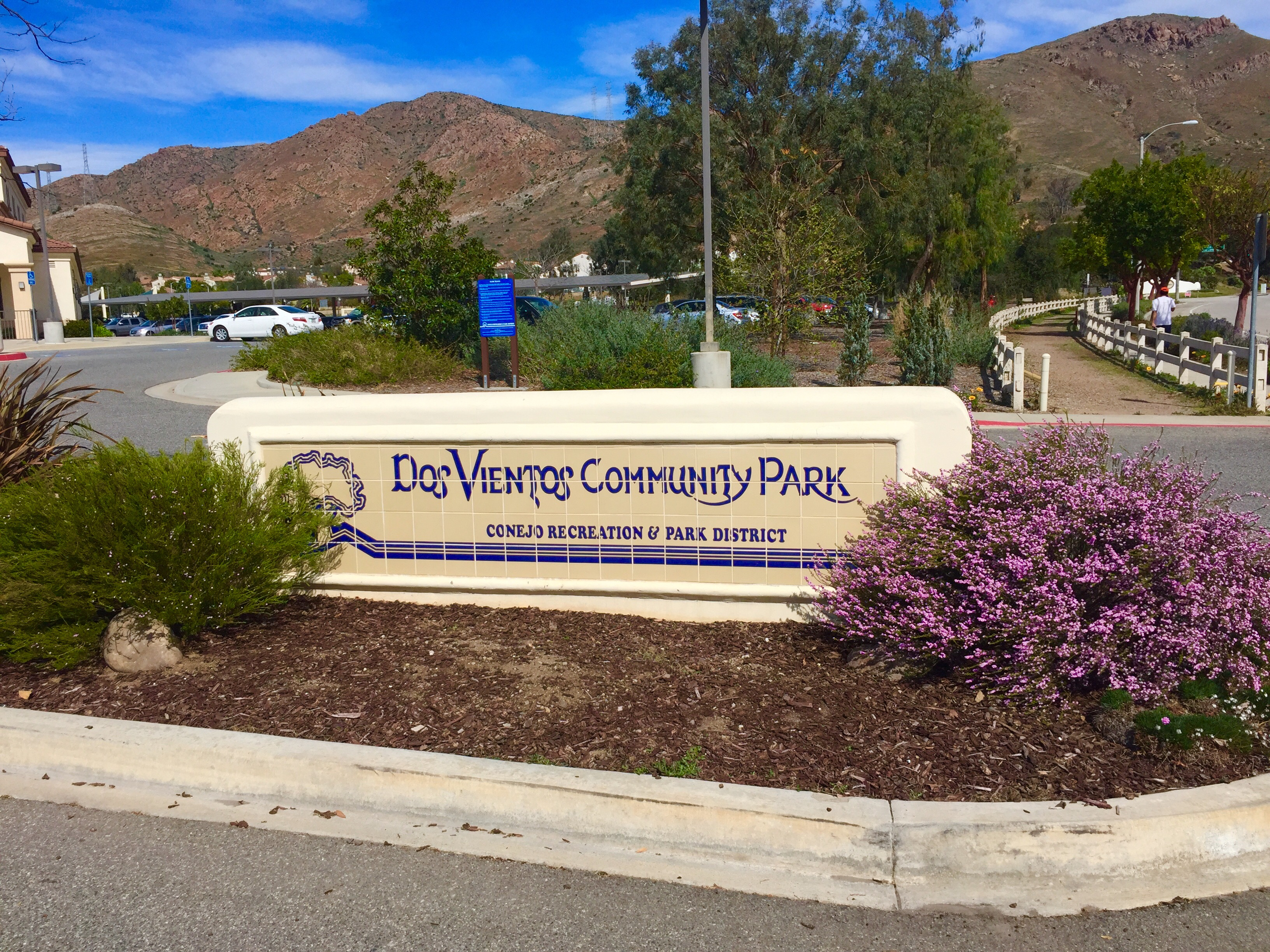
Dos Vientos Community Park

Conejo Recreation and Park District was established in January 1963 by a vote of Conejo Valley residents. Its first park board consisted of Luther C. Schwich, Roy Dehm, Marvin W, Burow, Donald M. Roberts, and Joan McGillis. One of the agency's first accomplishments was the construction of the valley’s first public swimming pool at Thousand Oaks High School in 1964. The agency received its largest land donation in December 1966, when Potrero Homes donated 1,250 acres of canyon- and mesa lands near California Lutheran University, now known as Wildwood Regional Park. The agency branches out throughout the late 1960s, sponsoring overnight camps, ball games, nature walks, and other activities. The agency made efforts since 1970 aimed at acquiring funds for a swimming pool at Newbury Park High School, which was constructed at the school in 1972. The district purchased the 30-acre Borchard Community Park in Newbury Park in February 1969. The Thousand Oaks Community Center was built in 1971, and the district acquired large parts of Lang Ranch in 1972. Among the last prime pieces of parkland was acquired in the mid 1980s, which included the 240-acre Wildwood Mesa.

The Conejo Open Space Conservation Agency (COSCA), a joint city-park district, was established in 1977 as a joint effort between City of Thousand Oaks and the agency.

== List of parks ==
50 parks are operated in Conejo Valley:

- Banyan Park (Newbury Park, CA)
- Beyer Park
- Borchard Community Park (Newbury Park)
- Canada Park
- Conejo Community Park
- Conejo Creek North Park
- Conejo Creek South Park
- Conejo Creek Southwest Park
- Conejo Creek Equestrian Park
- Conejo Valley Botanic Garden
- Cypress Park (Newbury Park)
- Del Prado Playfield (Newbury Park)
- Dos Vientos Community Park (Newbury Park)
- Dos Vientos Neighborhood Park (Newbury Park)
- El Parque de la Paz
- Estella Park (first public park in Thousand Oaks)
- Evenstar Park
- Fiore Playfield
- Glenwood Park
- Hickory Park (Newbury Park)
- Kimber Park (Newbury Park)
- Lang Ranch Neighborhood Park
- Las Flores Community Garden
- Lynn Oaks Park (Newbury Park)
- Newbury Gateway Park
- North Ranch Neighborhood Park
- North Ranch Playfield
- Northwood Park
- Oakbrook Neighborhood Park
- Oakbrook Regional Park (home of Chumash Indian Museum)
- Old Meadows Park
- Pepper Tree Playfield (Newbury Park)
- Rancho Conejo Playfields (Newbury Park)
- Russell Park
- Sapwi Trails Community Park
- Southshore Hills Park
- Spring Meadow Park
- Stagecoach Inn Park
- Suburbia Park
- Sunset Hills Park
- Sycamore Neighborhood Park (Newbury Park)
- Thousand Oaks Community Park
- Triunfo Park
- Walnut Grove Equestrian Center (Newbury Park)
- Walnut Grove Park (Newbury Park)
- Waverly Park
- Wendy Park (Newbury Park)
- Wildflower Playfield
- Wildwood Neighborhood Park
- Wildwood Regional Park

== See also ==
- Conejo Open Space Conservation Agency (COSCA)
- Conejo Open Space Foundation (COSF)
- Santa Monica Mountains National Recreation Area (SMMNRA)
