= Janss Marketplace =

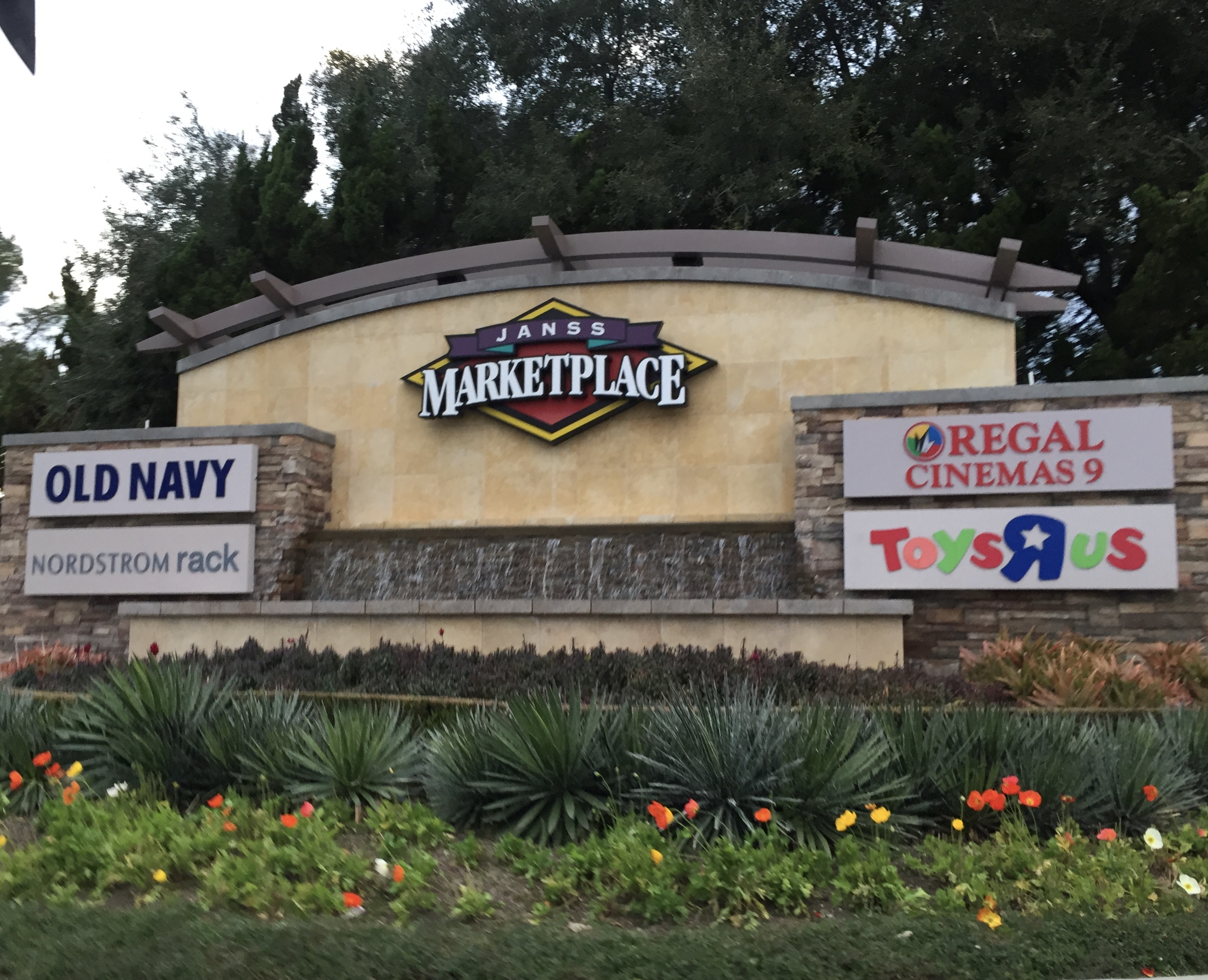
- Location: Thousand Oaks, California
- Coordinates: 34.183°N 118.878°W
- No. of stores and services: 39
- No. of anchor tenants: 4
- No. of floors: 1

Janss Marketplace is an outdoor shopping mall in Thousand Oaks, California. Previously known as Janss Mall, it opened in September 1961 as Village Lane. It was the first mall established in the city, and Thousand Oaks' only shopping center until The Oaks was built in 1978. 39 businesses are located here as of 2025. Conejo Valley Art Museum is also located here. It is home to well-known anchoring stores - Nordstrom Rack, and Old Navy. - along with specialty shops and fast food establishments. It has a nine-screen movie theater and is surrounded by neighborhood restaurants.

A big attraction here in the 1960s was its 854-seat Fox Conejo movie theater. The theater opened in May 1963 with a gala premiere of the movie A Gathering of Eagles (1963). Celebrities such as Lee J. Cobb, Barbara Eden, Gary Crosby and Annette Funicello attended the opening gala.

In 2015, Sears Holdings spun off 235 of its properties, including the Sears at Janss Marketplace, into Seritage Growth Properties. Sears downsized its store from 171,000 square feet (15,900 square meters) to 68,750 square feet (6,387 square meters) to make way for Nordstrom Rack, DSW, and Sports Authority, which closed in 2016.

The Reign of Terror Haunted House is located here, which is a 25,000 square feet (2,300 square meters) house open for tours on and around Halloween.

Toys "R" Us closed in June 2018.

On June 28, 2018, it was announced that Sears would be closing as part of a plan to close 78 stores nationwide. The store closed in September 2018. The former Sports Authority space became Dave & Busters that year.
