= Newbury Gateway Park =

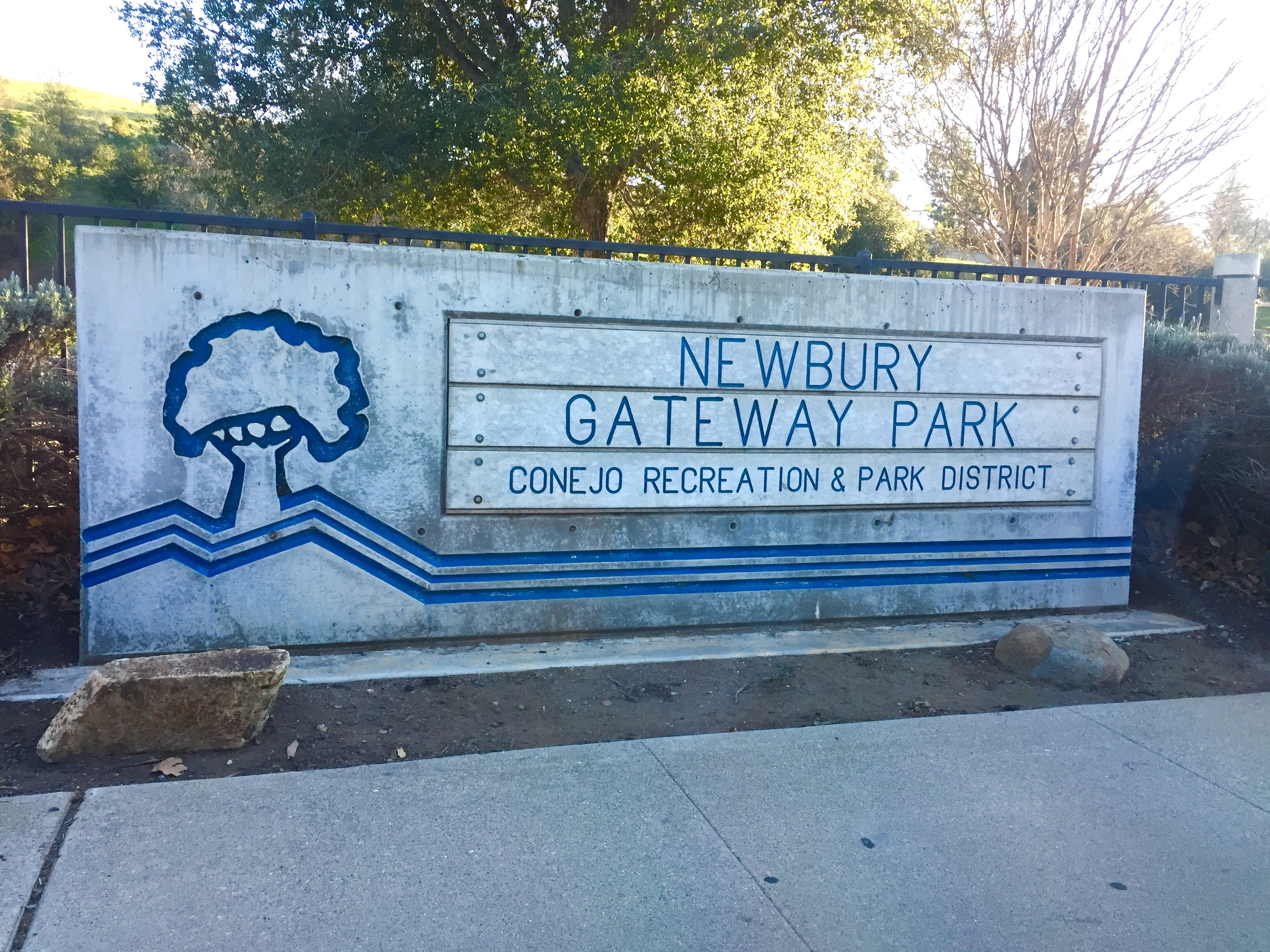
- Sign by entrance
- Interactive map of Newbury Gateway Park
- Type: Neighborhood park
- Location: 2250 Michael Drive; Newbury Park, California, United States
- Coordinates: 34°10′51.5″N 118°55′34.4″W
- Area: 7 acres (2.8 ha)
- Created: 1999
- Operator: Conejo Recreation & Park District (CRPD)
- Status: Open daily 7:00am to 10:00pm

Newbury Gateway Park is a seven-acre neighborhood park, located across the street from Newbury Park Library in western Newbury Park, California. The most notable attraction here includes the endemic plant and tree species, including an oak grove with over a hundred planted native oak trees. It contains picnic areas, a playground, turf area, and seating benches. First acquired in 1984, the open space area added four additional acres of land and was developed into a neighborhood park by the Conejo Recreation & Park District (CRPD) in cooperation with Thousand Oaks in 1999. Newbury Gateway Park was closed for nearly a year in the 2012-2013 period as a result of a major drainage problems.

It is a dog park, utilized for hiking, mountain biking, running, picnicking, and recreational activities. It is situated in an area of Newbury Park that was built in the 1960s under Ventura County jurisdiction, while Newbury Park still remained fully outside of Thousand Oaks city limits.
