= Pepper Tree Playfield =

Community park in Newbury Park, California

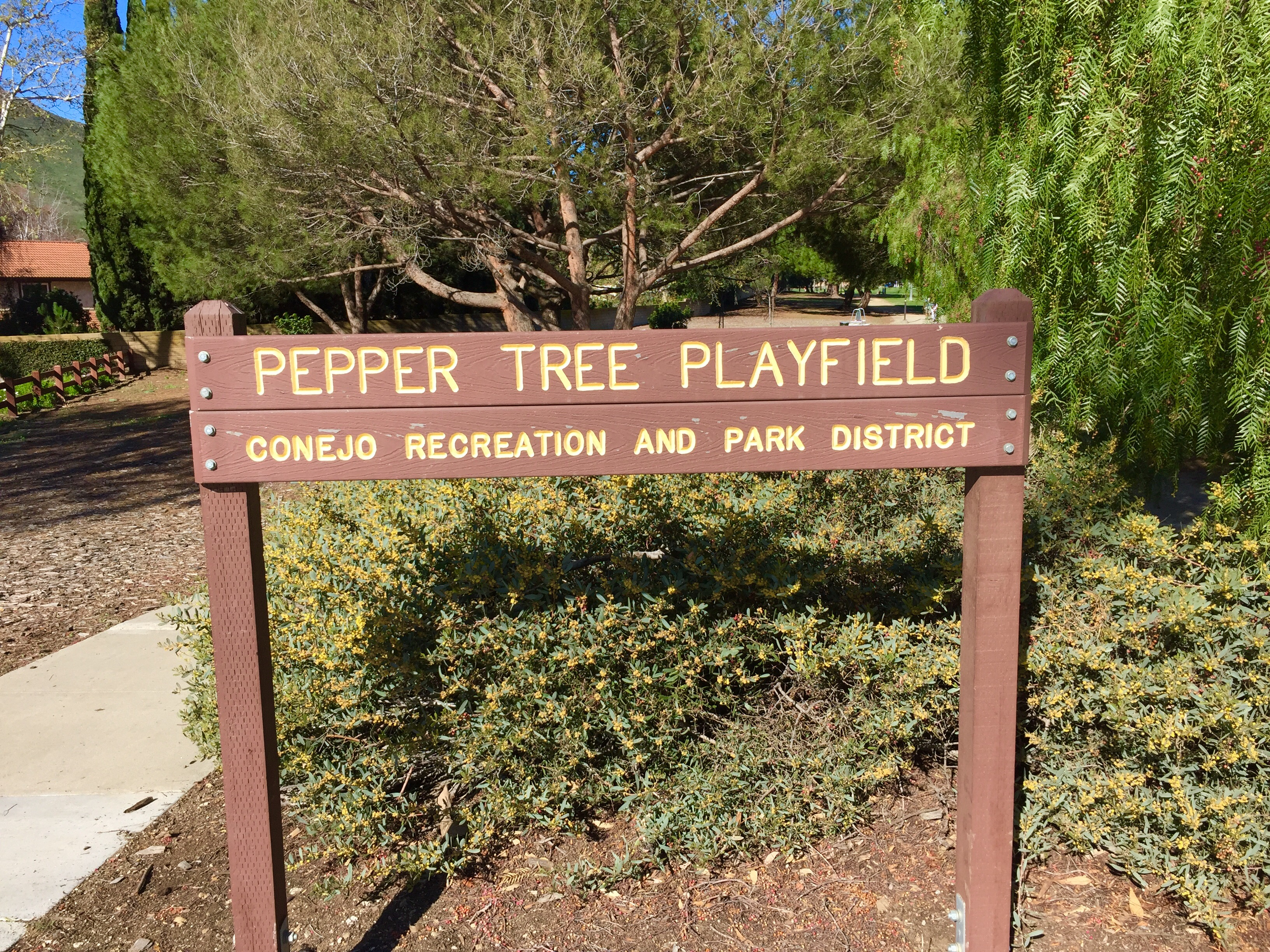
- Sign by park entrance.
- Interactive map of Pepper Tree Playfield
- Type: Community park
- Location: 3720 Old Conejo Rd. Newbury Park, CA
- Coordinates: 34°11′30″N 118°57′22″W
- Area: 21.7 acres (8.8 ha)
- Created: 1983
- Operator: Conejo Recreation & Park District (CRPD)
- Status: Open

Pepper Tree Playfield is a 21.7-acre community park located in western Newbury Park, California. It is located at the corner of Reino and Old Conejo Roads, and was acquired by the Conejo Recreation & Park District (CRPD) in 1977, but not developed nor opened until 1983. It contains a 0.83-mile fitness trail loop, and is nearby numerous trailheads. The park is within walking distance from the Conejo Vista Trailhead in Old Conejo Open Space, located immediately north of Pepper Tree Playfield, and the park is directly across the street from the Knoll Trailhead (Pepper Tree Vista Trail) in Knoll Open Space, which is to the park’s immediate east, crossing North Reino Road. It is also an access point for trails leading to the Conejo Mountain. Pepper Tree Playfield is named for its many pepper trees, which surrounds the park area.

The park is managed by the Conejo Recreation & Park District (CRPD), It contains three parking stalls, bleacher seating for 120, picnic tables and structures, a playground, four soccer fields, and two softball fields. The park is used for a variety of recreational activities, including but not limited to hiking, football, softball, cross country running, soccer, camping, running, and bird observation.

Pepper Tree Playfield, along with Dos Vientos Community Park, is home to American Youth Soccer Organization (AYSO) Region 42 (Newbury Park) and draws hundreds of players and spectators during the AYSO season, with fields here utilized for games on weekends during half of the year beginning in September.

To get here from the Ventura Freeway in Newbury Park, CA, take the Exit for Wendy Drive. If coming from Los Angeles, turn left from the off-ramp onto Wendy Dr. then turn right immediately over the bridge on Old Conejo Road at the Mobil Station. If coming from Ventura/Santa Barbara, proceed straight from the off-ramp; this will place you on Old Conejo Road. After one mile, park at Pepper Tree Playfield. It is situated at 3720 Old Conejo Road.
