= Borchard Community Park =

Park in Newbury Park, California, United States

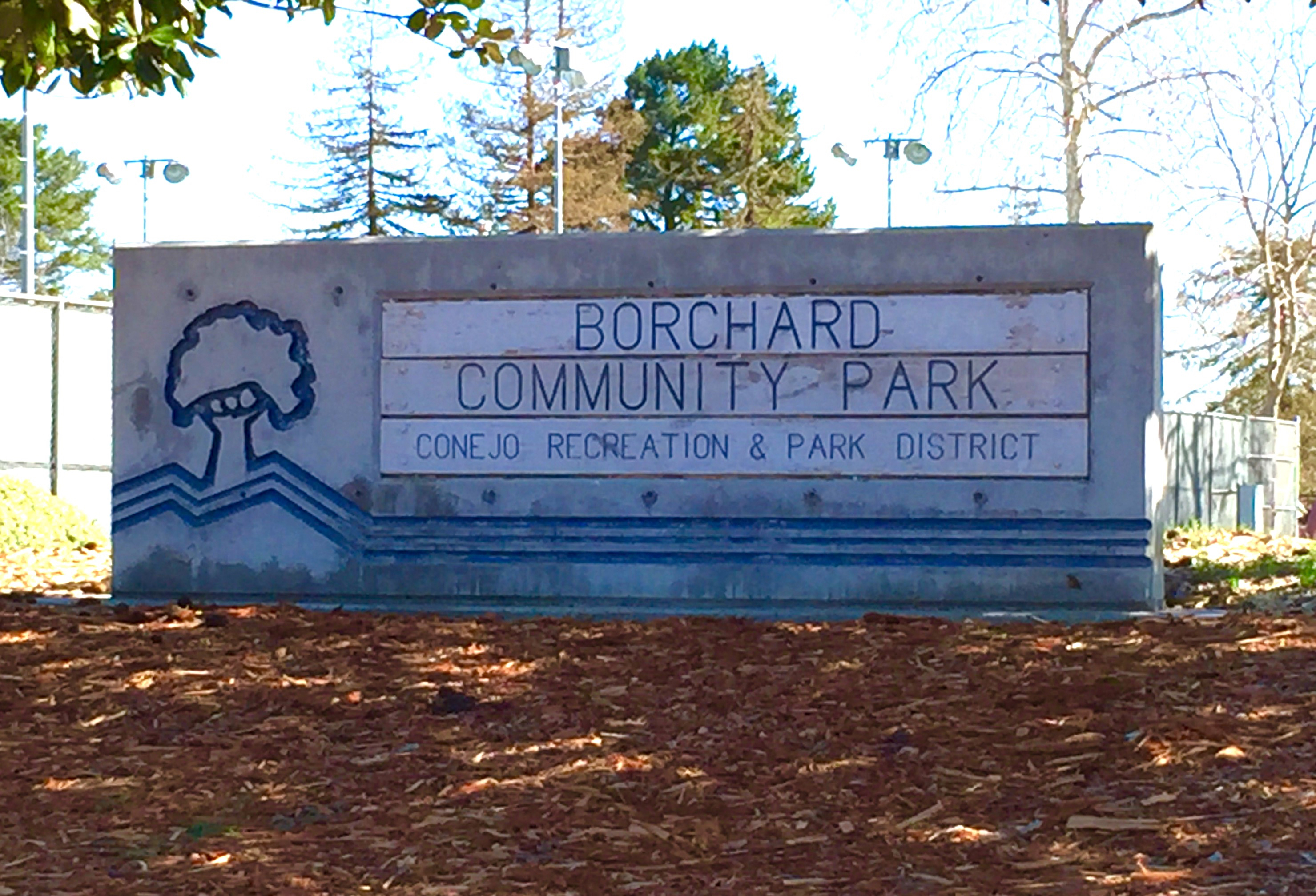
- Sign by entrance
- Interactive map of Borchard Community Park
- Type: Community park
- Location: 190 N. Reino Road, Newbury Park, CA
- Coordinates: 34°10′45.7″N 118°57′02.4″W
- Area: 29 acres (12 ha)
- Created: 1969
- Operator: Conejo Recreation & Park District (CRPD)
- Status: Open daily 7:00am to 10:00pm

Borchard Community Park is a public park located in western Newbury Park, CA. Situated adjacent to both the Newbury Park High School and the Borchard Maintenance Shop, the park is situated at the corner of Reino Road and Borchard Road at the foothills of the Santa Monica Mountains. The park encompasses 29 acres, which is home to various courts for recreational sports, fitness area, community rooms, a farm themed playground, picnic areas, several fields, and a skate park. The park was established by the Conejo Recreation & Park District (CRPD) in 1969. It has two volleyball courts, four tennis courts, two stages, three softball fields, a basketball court, barbecue grills, two bocci courts, a gymnasium, horseshoe pits, a kitchen, a soccer field, two playgrounds, and more.

To get here from Highway 101, take the Borchard Road/Rancho Conejo Road Exit and go southwest on Borchard Rd. for one mile to the park entrance. It is located at 190 Reino Road in western Newbury Park.

There is an undergoing project to create a multiuse pathway along the Arroyo Conejo from the southern parts of the park through Casa Conejo, CA and further to the Newbury Park Library.

Near the corner of Borchard- and Reino Roads, where Borchard Community Park is located today, was the home of the pioneer Caspar Borchard family, who owned a large ranch here in 1881–1961.
