= American Radio Archives =

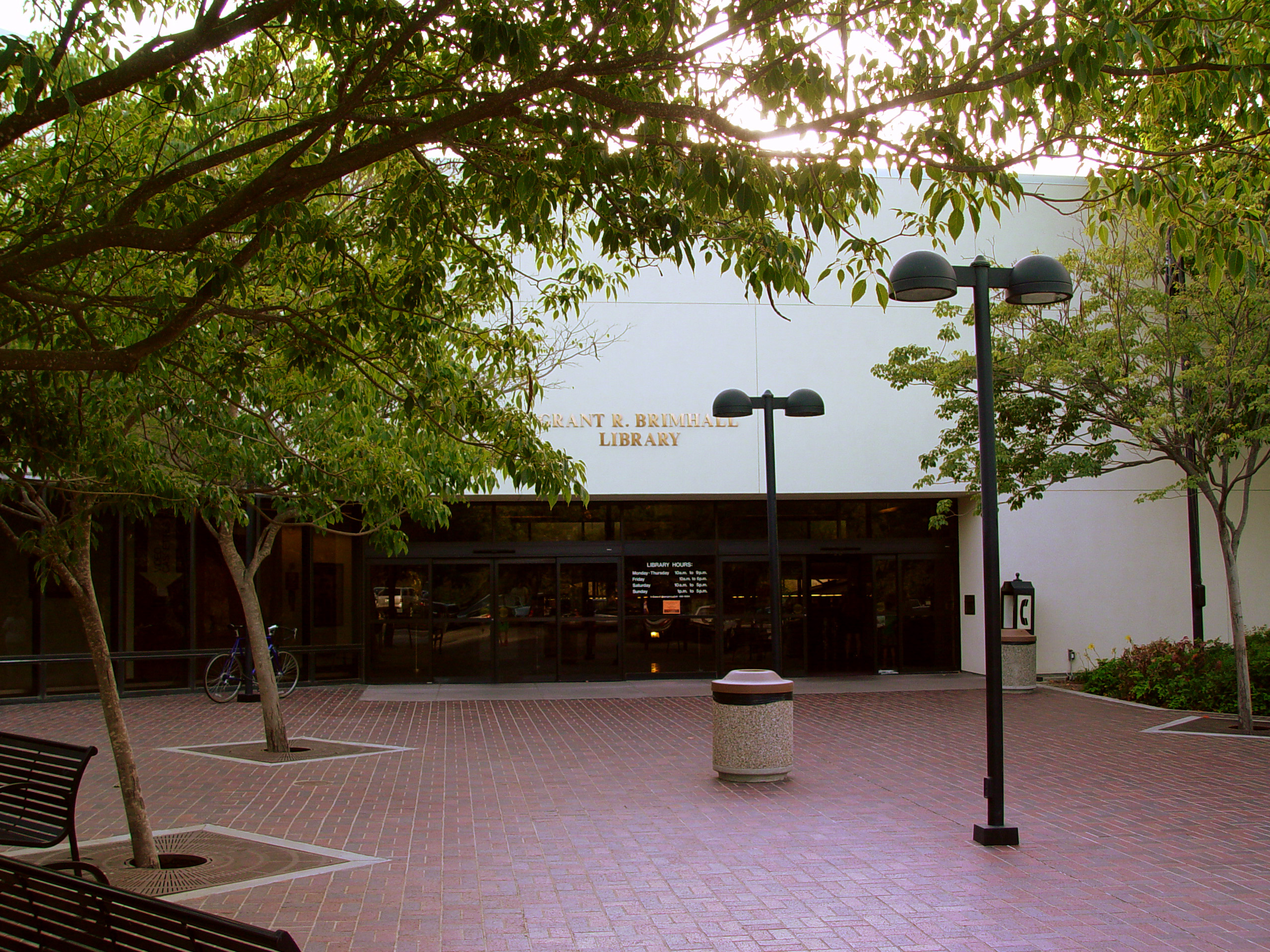
- American Radio Archives is located at the Grant R. Brimhall Library.
- Interactive map of American Radio Archives
- 34°11′58.53″N 118°51′11.78″W
- Location: 1401 E Janss Rd, Thousand Oaks, California, United States
- Established: 1984
- Affiliation: Thousand Oaks Library
- Website: www.americanradioarchives.com

American Radio Archives is located within the Thousand Oaks Library in Thousand Oaks, California and contains one of the largest collections of radio broadcasting in the United States and in the world. The archives was established in 1984 by the Thousand Oaks Library Foundation. The collections include 23,000 radio and TV scripts, 10,000 photographs, 10,000 books on radio history, and 5,000 audio recordings. The archives also house manuscripts, sound recordings, scripts, books, photographs and other materials related to the history of radio and radio broadcasting.

The American Radio Archives are part of the Special Collections Department at Grant R. Brimhall Library. The purpose of the archives is to collect, preserve, and share materials related to the history of the radio in perpetuity. The Archives has collected materials since the 1990s. They now also house materials from the Pacific Pioneer Broadcasters, an organization of people working in radio or related fields. The addition of the Pacific Pioneer Broadcasters materials greatly expanded the collection in both size and scope.

Radio collections include TV material, as actors and writers often crossed into the other medium. The development of television is therefore a large part of radio’s history, and well represented at the Broadcasting Collection. The TV scripts of ARA belong to two groups: the general Broadcasting Collection and a number of smaller collections. The Broadcasting Collection consists of scripts purchased over the years from various sources. Smaller collections contain material compiled by institutions and individuals. The scripts span more than 40 years of American TV history, including live broadcasting in the 1940s through the 1980s. The ARA covers the spectrum of TV entertainment programming, from soap opera to comedy, westerns, dramas, crime series, and more.

== Thousand Oaks Library ==
The Thousand Oaks Library system was created in 1982. The American Radio Archives are part of the Thousand Oaks Library's special collections, which also include information on the early history of Conejo Valley, including manuscripts, oral histories, photographs, and maps. Not all finding aids are currently online, but the library is making a slow push to publicize finding aids and indexes of materials. American Radio Archives is located in the main branch location of the Thousand Oaks Library system.

== Collections ==
American Radio Archives and Museum offers one of the largest collections of radio broadcasting in the United States and in the world. It has a collection of 23,000 radio and TV scripts, 10,000 photographs, 10,000 books on radio history, and 5,000 audio recordings. Notable collections include the Bob Crosby, Norman Corwin, Carlton E. Morse, Monty Masters, Rudy Vallée, and KNX AM collections. The Radio Series Scripts Collections contains scripts from 1930-1990, while the Radio Sound Records Collection contains recordings from 1932-1994.

The collections include scripts, books, personal papers, sound records, photographs, correspondence, and other material reflecting the history of radio- and TV broadcasting. Collections at the American Radio Archives tend to be named for the person who compiled the material. Oftentimes this is the script authors, but may also be a producer, actor, an institution, etc.

=== List of collections ===
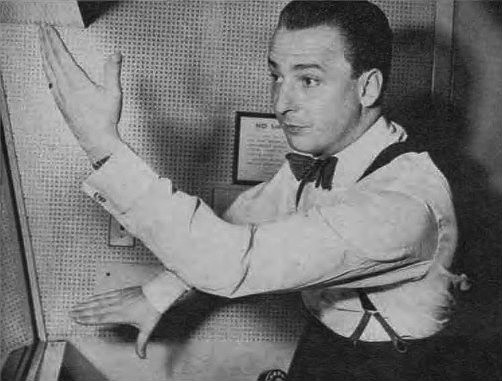
Fletcher Markle directing CBS Radio's Studio One (1948)

A full list of all collections held by the American Radio archives can be found on the website of the Thousand Oaks Library. There are forty-four collections listed on their website, though not all are searchable online. Just over half of the collections have online finding aids. Some of the most notable collections and resources include:

- Bob Crosby Collection: The collection consists of three bound volumes of scripts for the Jack Benny Show, where Bob Crosby appeared as the bandleader in 1952-55.
- Broadcasting Collection: the general collection of the American Radio Archives, consisting of donated and purchased scripts which are not part of any individual collection. It consists of small runs of many titles, approximately 18 linear feet.
- Carlton E. Morse Collection: Carlton E. Morse was one of radio’s most prolific writers. He adapted the long-running series One Man's Family for television. The collection has scripts, photos, correspondence, and miscellaneous materials related to Morse’s radio series and the TV adaption. The collection is 32 linear feet.
- LACC Collection: includes television scripts donated to American Radio Archives by the Los Angeles City College (LACC) Communications Department.
- Monty Masters Collection: story treatments, scripts and other material documenting the career of San Francisco-based comedian Monty Masters. The collection is seven linear feet.
- Norman Corwin Collection: motion picture screenplays, sound- and video recordings, scrapbooks, motion picture screenplays, correspondence, scripts, and various ephemera primarily related to Norman Corwin’s career in radio. Includes works for CBS such as V-E day (Victorian in Europe), On a Note of Triumph, in 1945. His television work includes Norman Corwin Presents and The Rivalry (1959). The collection is around 120 linear feet of material which were selected for inclusion during Corwin’s lifetime. The bulk of accessible materials document Corwin's career in radio and television broadcasting, motion pictures, the theater, and as an author and teacher, from 1935 to 1990.
- Rudy Vallée Collection: scrapbooks, correspondence, scripts, etc. relating to singer-songwriter Rudy Vallée, who also had a career as an author, actor, bandleader, and saxophone player. Primarily featured is shows where Vallée made guest appearances. This collection consists of over 500 linear feet of material and constitutes the great majority of personal documents in Vallée's possession at the time of his death, including correspondence, scrapbooks, radio and television scripts, sound recordings, musical scores, photographs, business records, press clippings, and various ephemera. The bulk of accessible materials documents Vallée's career in radio broadcasting and entertainment from 1925-1975.
