= Conejo Valley Art Museum =

Museum in Thousand Oaks, California

- Established: 1978
- Director: Rachel Adams
- Public transit access: Thousand Oaks Transit (TOT)
- Website: Official website

Conejo Valley Art Museum is a museum previously located at Janss Marketplace in Thousand Oaks, California. The Museum is currently searching for a new location in the Thousand Oaks area. Established in 1978, the museum showcases fine art, modern art, abstracts, textiles and sculptures. Displays are changing periodically and often include artwork featured on national tours. The museum has hosted art collections from artists such as Howard Brodie, David Rose and Elizabeth Williams. It was previously located in an old library on W. Wilbur Road, but was moved to the Janss Mall in 1990.

Exhibitions here have included oil paintings, prehistoric pottery, quilts, photographs, sketches and print making. Its store offers folk art, literature and jewelry.

Conejo Valley Art Museum has presented the annual Thousand Oaks ArtWalk, used to draw 12-14,000 spectators, and included outdoor art exhibitions and live music.
