= Cypress Park (Newbury Park) =

Park in California, United States of America

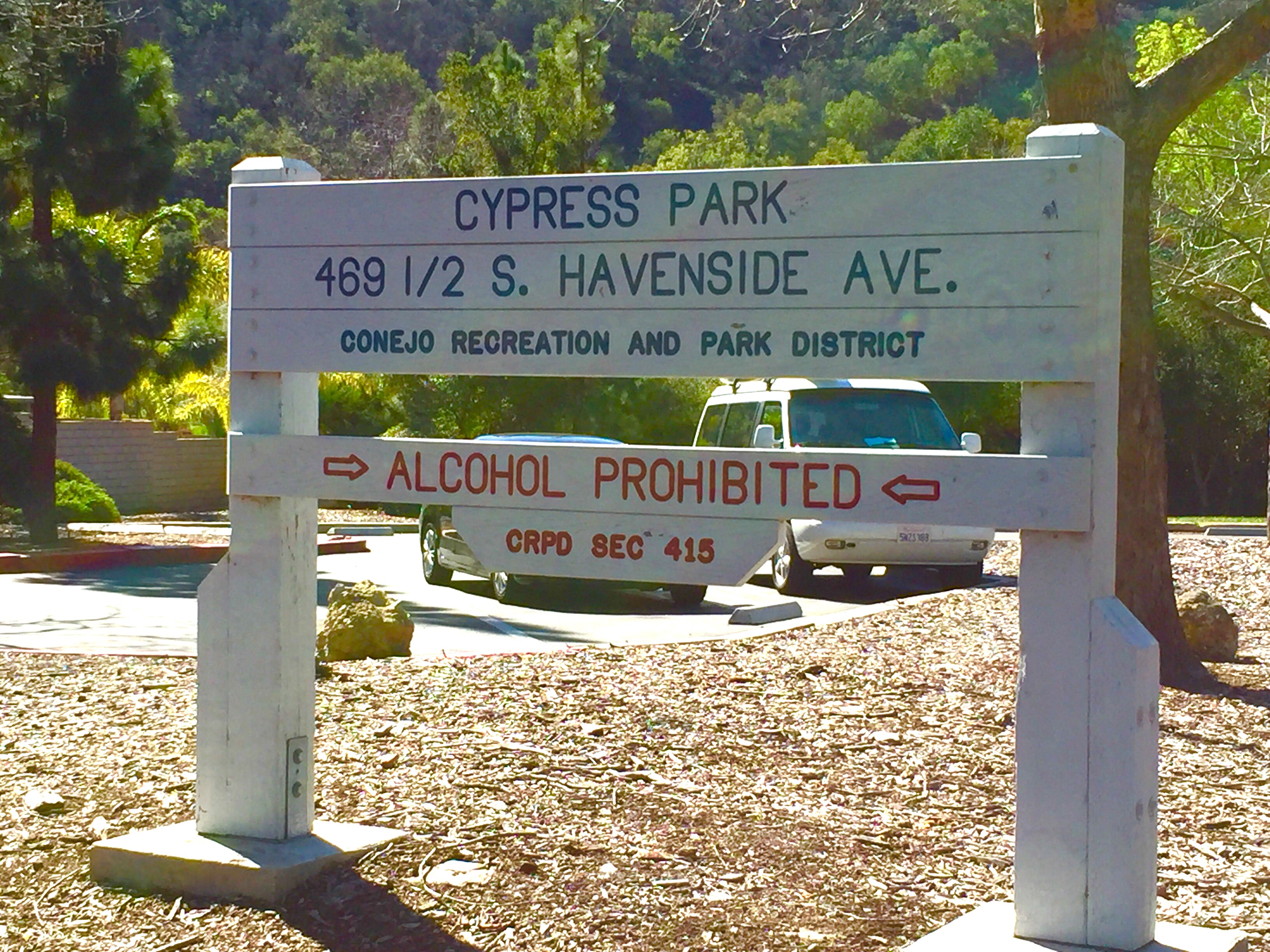
- Sign by entrance
- Interactive map of Cypress Park
- Type: Neighborhood park
- Location: 459 Havenside Avenue, Newbury Park, CA
- Coordinates: 34°10′04.9″N 118°57′44.9″W
- Area: 5 acres (2.0 ha)
- Created: 1973
- Operator: Conejo Recreation & Park District (CRPD)
- Status: Open daily 7:00am to 10:00pm

Cypress Park is a five-acre neighborhood park in southwestern Newbury Park, California. Acquired in 1969, the land was developed into a community park in 1973 with a baseball field, a playground, picnic tables, and bleachers. It is owned and operated by the Conejo Recreation & Park District (CRPD). Situated immediately south of Cypress Elementary School, the park is also home to several ponds and smaller creeks. It is used for bird-observations, recreational activities, picnicking, and camping.

Located in southern Newbury Park, the park is within walking distance of Del Prado Playfield, Dos Vientos Ranch Park, Potrero Ridge Open Space, and the Santa Monica Mountains National Recreation Area by Rancho Sierra Vista.

The nearby Cypress Elementary School is home to the original school bell which belonged to the 1889 Timber School.
