= Conejo Mountain =

Extinct volcano in California

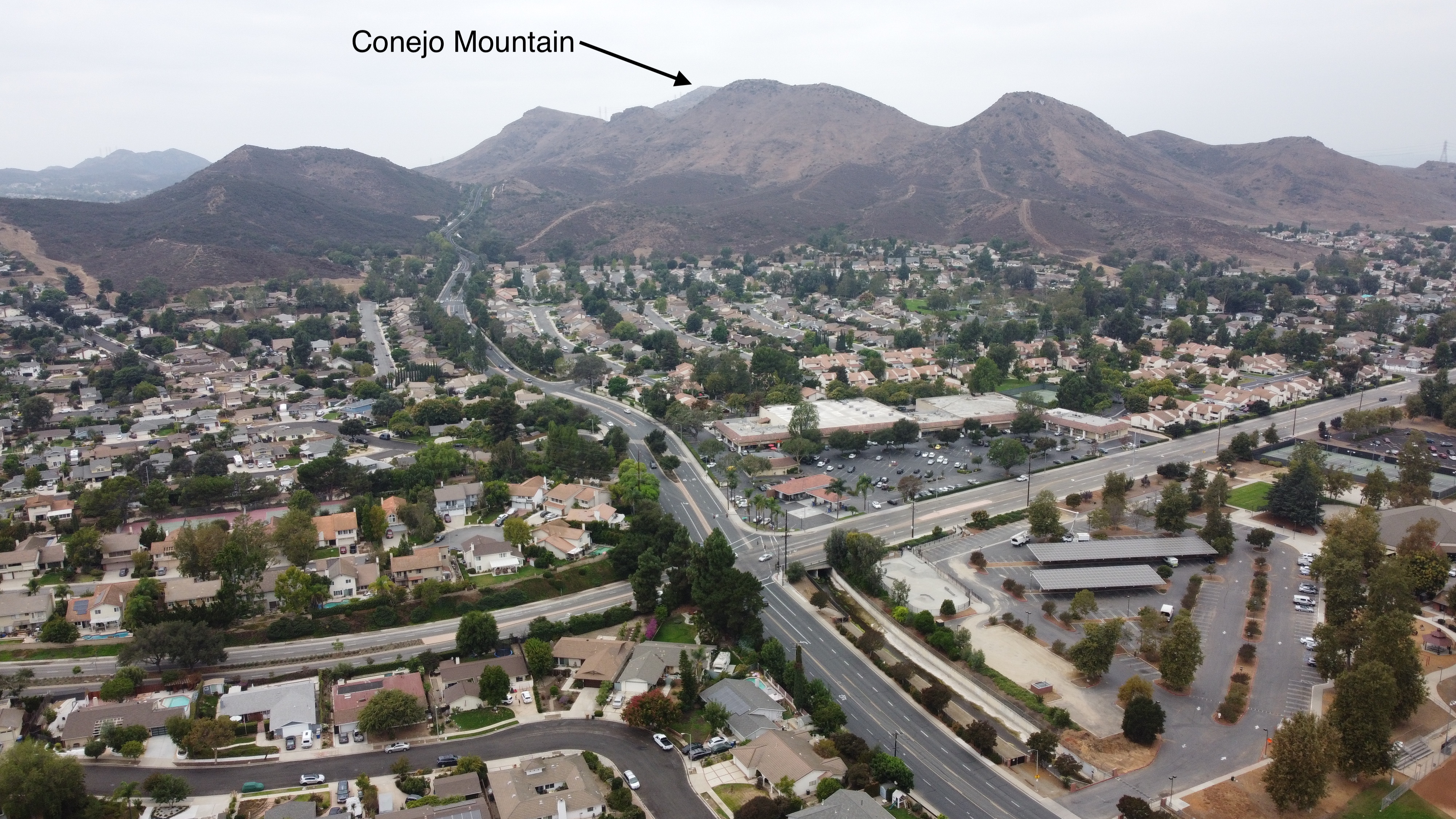
- Conejo Mountain sits on the western edge of the Conejo Valley in Thousand Oaks, California. The intersection of Borchard Rd. and Reino Rd. is shown in the foreground.

Highest point
- Elevation: 1,814 ft (553 m)
- Coordinates: 34°11′18″N 118°59′4″W

Geography
- Location: Camarillo, California
- Topo map: Camarillo East

Conejo Mountain is a 1,814-foot-high mountain (553 m) in Ventura County, California, near Camarillo on the eastern boundary of the Oxnard Plain. At the western edge of the Conejo Valley, it is adjacent to the Santa Monica Mountains. Crossing what was once a formidable barrier for travelers, U.S. Route 101 passes through the area on the steep Conejo Grade.

The mountain was once a large volcano about 14 million years ago, but it has been extinct for millions of years. The mountain was under sea level at one point. Mining operations have been ongoing here since 1959, and most of the mountain is owned by the Pacific Rock mining operation.

The Santa Monica Mountains Conservancy, Pleasant Valley Recreation and Park District, and Conejo Open Space Conservation Agency have interest in administrating the area as protected open space. Trails reach into the area from Pepper Tree Playfield and Dos Vientos Community Park via Dos Vientos Open Space in southwestern Newbury Park.
