= Banyan Park =

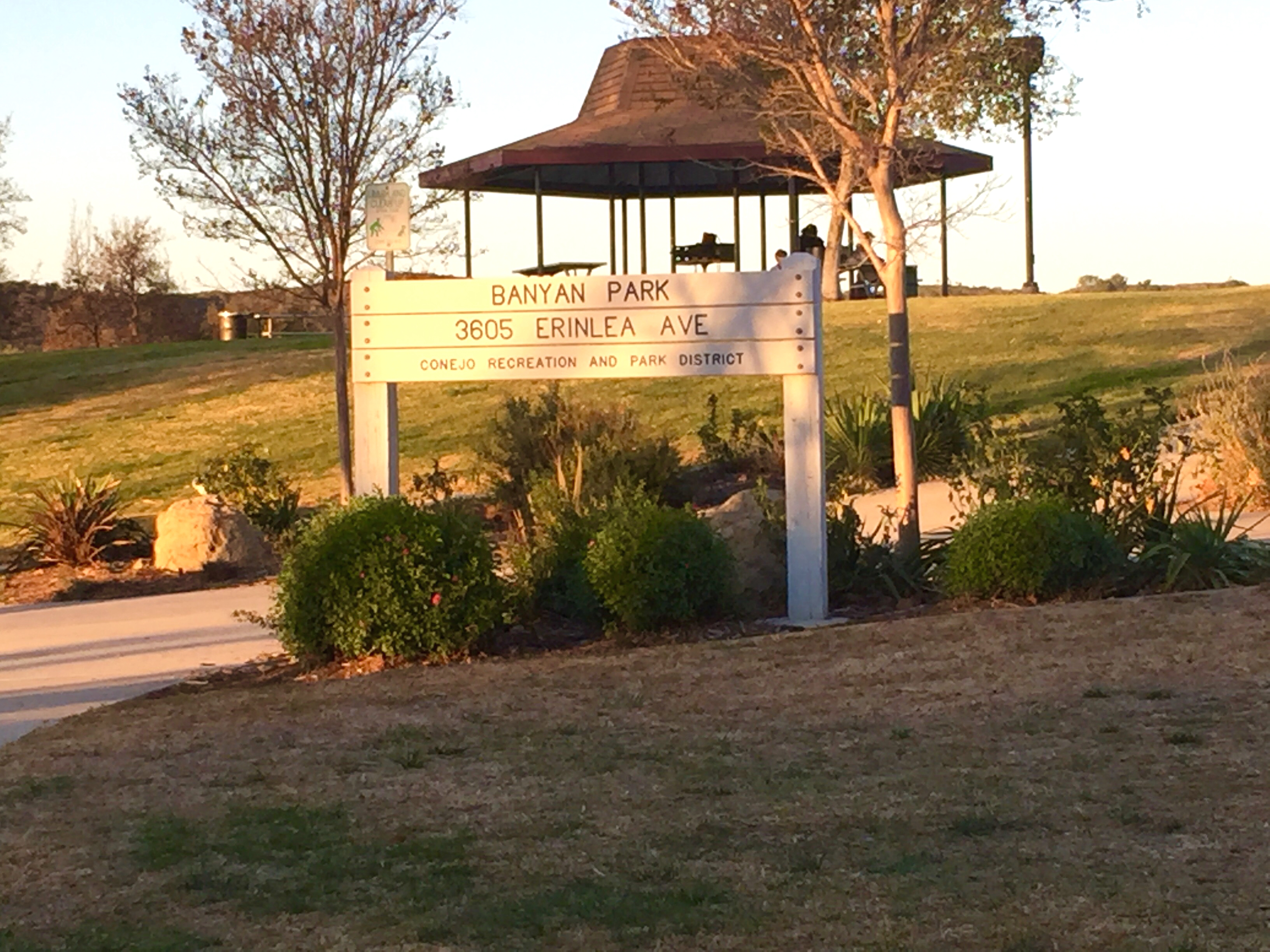
- Sign by entrance
- Interactive map of Banyan Park
- Type: Community park
- Location: 3605 Erinlea Avenue, Newbury Park, CA
- Coordinates: 34°09′27.2″N 118°57′07.0″W
- Area: 7.4 acres (3.0 ha)
- Created: 1964
- Operator: Conejo Recreation & Park District (CRPD)
- Status: Open daily 7:00am to 10:00pm

Banyan Park is a 7.4 acre community park at the foothills of the Santa Monica Mountains in southern Newbury Park, California. The park is approximately 800 feet from the Santa Monica Mountains National Recreation Area and is adjacent to the Banyan Elementary School. It was the first park to be acquired by the Conejo Recreation & Park District (CRPD) in 1964, and was later developed into a park in 1967. The park includes a hilltop gazebo, turf, picnic tables, barbecues, and playgrounds.

The park is home to acres of undeveloped areas, on some which there are plans of creating an amphitheater, sports courts, pathways, benches and landscape features, including butterfly- and hummingbird gardens. The park added four additional acres in 1992. It is located at 3605 Erinlea Avenue in southern Newbury Park.
