= Hickory Park =

Park in California, United States

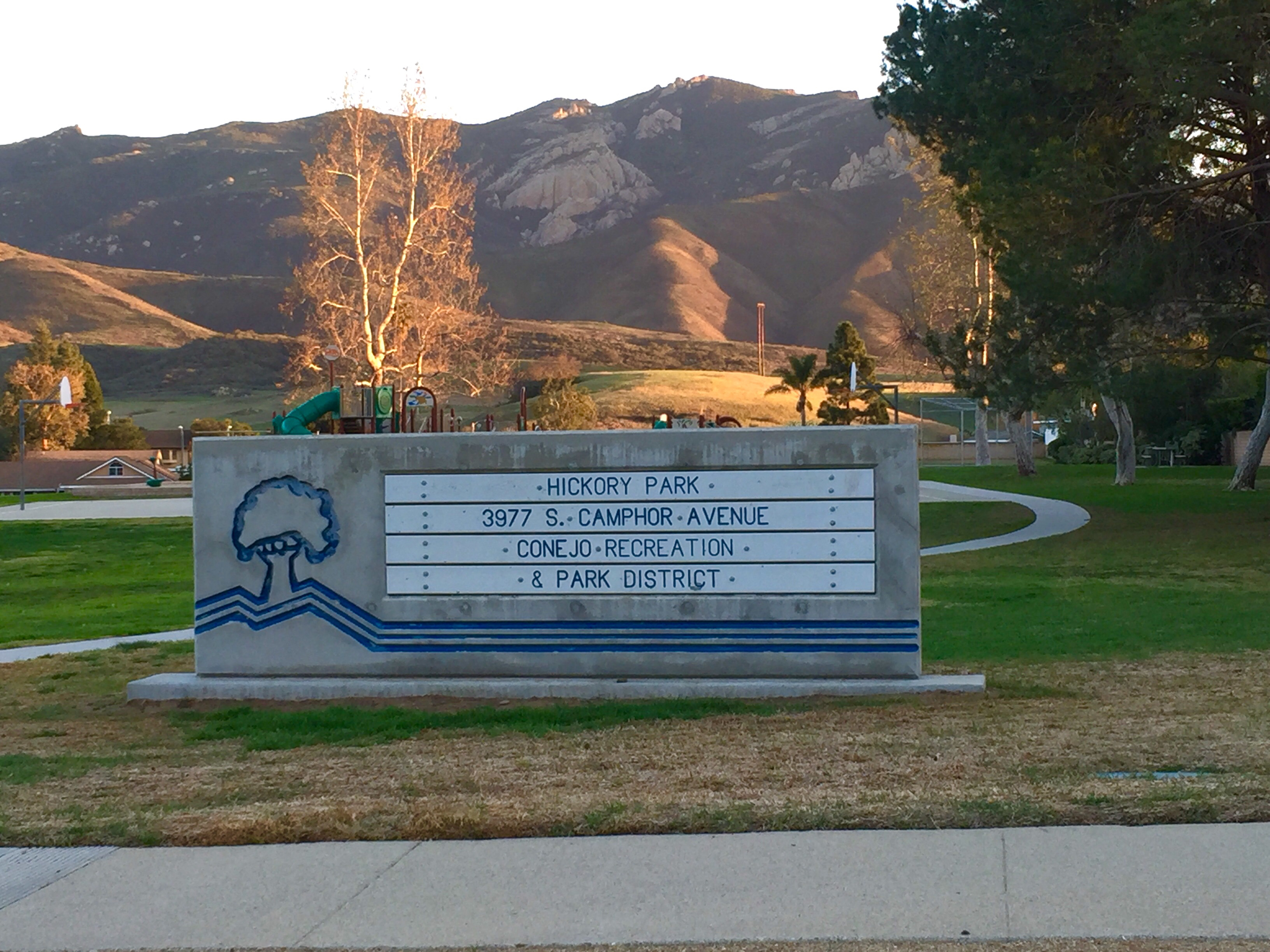
- Entrance sign looking west with the Santa Monica Mountains in the far-back
- Interactive map of Hickory Park
- Type: Neighborhood park
- Location: 3877 South Camphor Road; Newbury Park, CA
- Coordinates: 34°09′36.9″N 118°57′39.4″W
- Area: 5 acres (2.0 ha)
- Created: 1974
- Operator: Conejo Recreation and Park District (CRPD)
- Status: Open 7:00am to 10:00pm

Hickory Park is a neighborhood park at the foothills of the Santa Monica Mountains, less than 500 feet from the Santa Monica Mountains National Recreation Area, in southern Newbury Park, California. It is a five-acre park, which includes facilities such as a playground, basketball courts, backstop, barbecue grills, picnic tables, trails, etc.

It is one mile from the Satwiwa Native American Indian Culture Center and has numerous hiking trails nearby, including the Backbone Trail, which crosses the Santa Monica Mountains to Point Mugu. The parkland was acquired by the city in 1969 and developed into a park in 1974. Conejo Valley's longest creek, Arroyo Conejo, flows through the southern parts of Hickory Park.
