= Thousand Oaks Transit =

- Parent: City of Thousand Oaks
- Headquarters: 2100 Thousand Oaks Blvd.
- Locale: Thousand Oaks, California
- Service type: bus service, paratransit
- Routes: 5
- Fleet: 8
- Fuel type: CNG
- Operator: MV Transportation
- Website: totransit.org

Thousand Oaks Transit (TOT) is Thousand Oaks, California's transportation service, providing local routes that serve the need of those commuting within the city itself.

== Routes ==
=== Fixed-Route ===
Route	Terminals	Via	Notes
40	Thousand Oaks The Oaks	Borchard Rd, Hillcrest Dr	
41	Thousand Oaks The Oaks	Lynn Rd, Moorpark Rd	
42	Thousand Oaks The Oaks	Janss Rd, Avenida de los Arboles, Lynn Rd	
43	Thousand Oaks The Oaks	Thousand Oaks Bl	Express route
44	Thousand Oaks Thousand Oaks Transit Center	Hillcrest Dr	

== Transit Center ==
The Thousand Oaks Transit Center is located at 265 S. Rancho Road.

Connecting routes include:

Weekday LADOT 422 and 423 service to/from Downtown Los Angeles, including stops at Crypto.com Arena, USC, and points in between.

Metro route 161
