= Dos Vientos Community Park =

Park in California, United States

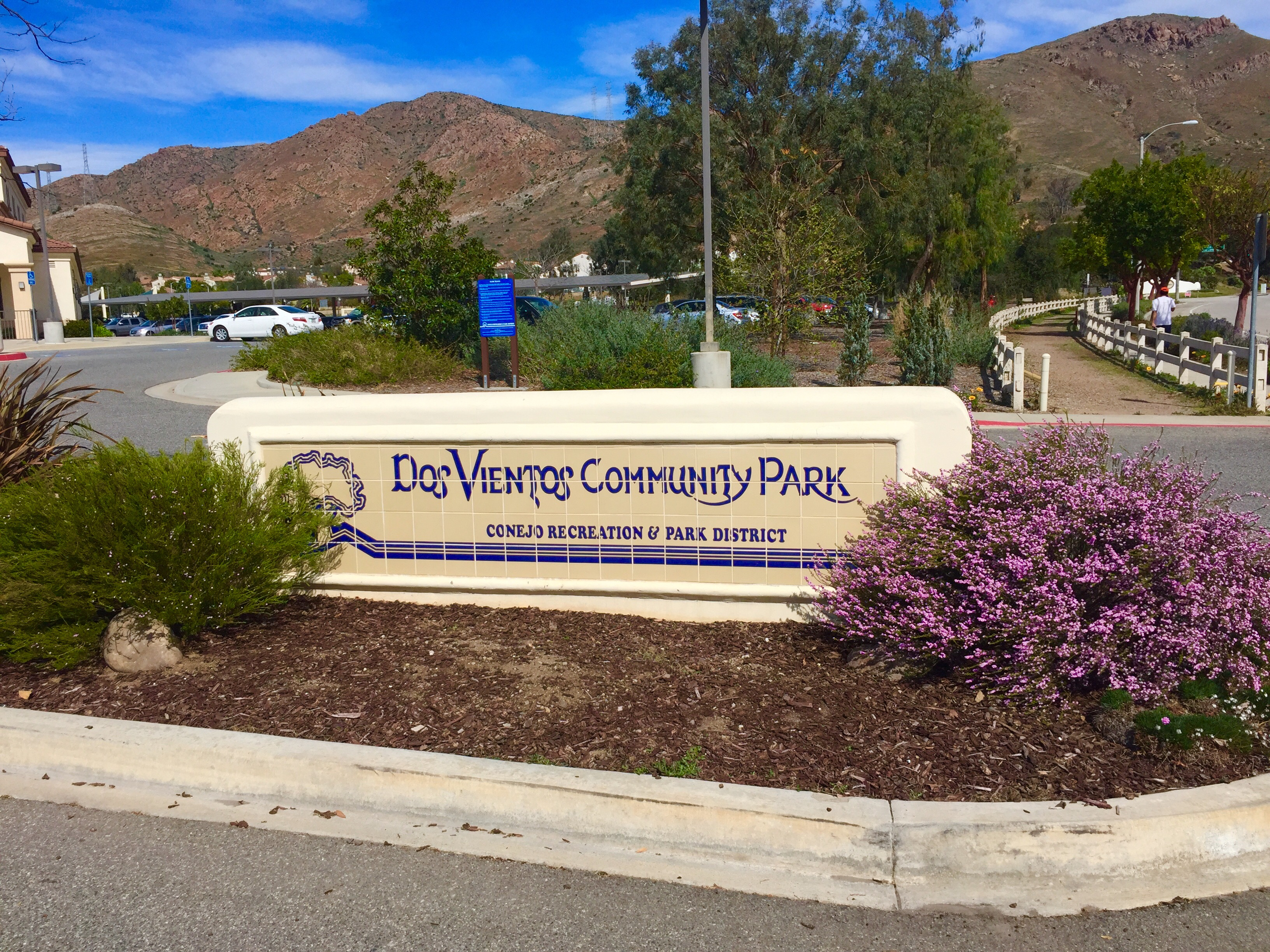
- Entrance sign, looking north with Conejo Mountain in the background to the left
- Interactive map of Dos Vientos Community Park
- Type: Open-space park
- Location: 4801 Borchard Road, Newbury Park, CA
- Coordinates: 34°10′32.1″N 118°59′00.4″W
- Area: 28 acres (11 ha)
- Created: 2001
- Operator: Conejo Recreation & Park District (CRPD)
- Status: Open daily 7am to 10pm

Dos Vientos Community Park in southwestern Newbury Park, CA is the largest of Conejo Recreation & Park District’s public parks in the Conejo Valley. It is adjacent to the Dos Vientos Community Center, which offers a preschool, sports, and other activities. The park contains sand volleyball courts, baseball-, basketball- and tennis courts, soccer fields, playground areas, and picnic tables and barbecue grills. It is adjacent to the Dos Vientos Open Space through the Park View Trail, which is a 1,216 acre natural open-space, bordering an additional 16,000 acres of open space stretching over the Santa Monica Mountains National Recreation Area to the Pacific Ocean. The Park View Trail ends at Via Ricardo, directly across the road from the Powerline Trail and Dos Vientos Open Space.

Another trail from the Dos Vientos Community Park, the Edison Trail (Powerline Trail), leads to the 2,200 feet high Conejo Mountain in Camarillo, CA. This trail offers panoramic views of the Oxnard Plain, the Pacific Ocean, numerous Channel Islands, Boney Mountain, Mugu Lagoon, and the Topa Topa Mountains. The trails here are utilized by equestrians, hikers, joggers, and mountain bikers. Recreational activities in Dos Vientos Community park includes basketball, handball, tennis, football, softball, lacrosse, skating, baseball, soccer, volleyball, badminton, and more.

To get here from the Ventura Freeway (U.S. 101), take Exit Borchard Road in Newbury Park, CA and drive south onto Borchard Road for 3.5 miles. The main trailhead follows the dirt path along the fence that follows Borchard Road southbound for 300 feet. At the split in the fence, make a right going through the split and up the hills located behind Dos Vientos Community Park. The address is 4801 Borchard Road.
