= The Oaks (Thousand Oaks, California) =

Shopping center in Ventura County

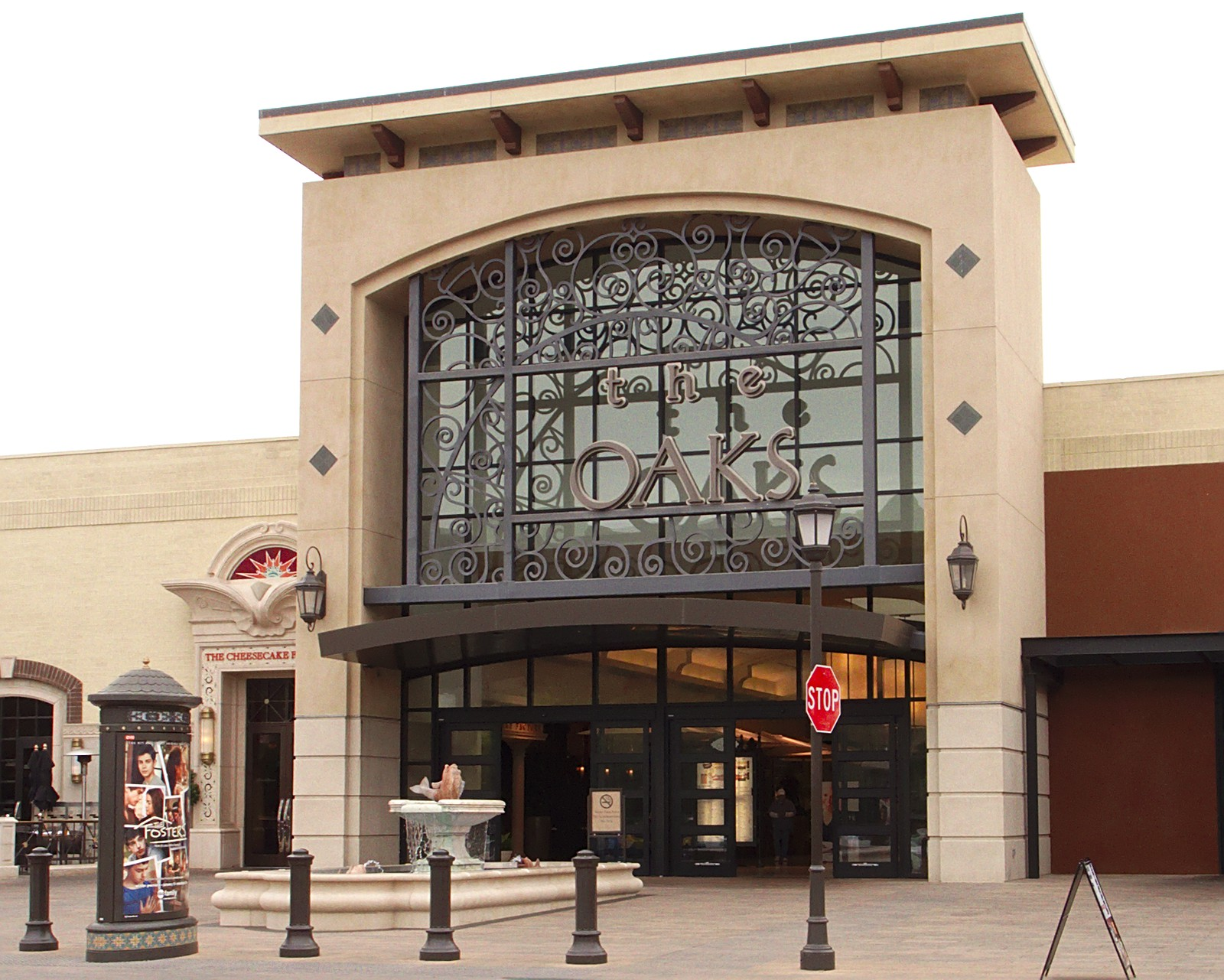
- Location: Thousand Oaks, Ventura County, California, United States
- Coordinates: 34.1843°N 118.8881°W
- Opened: April 1978
- Developer: The Hahn Company and the Janss Investment Company
- Owner: Stockdale Capital Partners
- Num. of stores: 170 (as of 2018)
- Num. of anchor tenants: 4
- Floor area: 1,300,000 sq ft (120,000 m^{2}).
- Floors: 2
- Website: Official Website

The Oaks is a two-level indoor/outdoor, regional shopping mall located in Thousand Oaks, California. Accessible from US Highway 101 (the Ventura Freeway) midway between downtown Los Angeles and Santa Barbara, it is the largest shopping center in Ventura County. Over five million people visit the mall each year. The mall features JCPenney, Macy's, Macy's Men's and Home Store, Nordstrom, in addition to a 14-screen dine-in AMC Theatre.

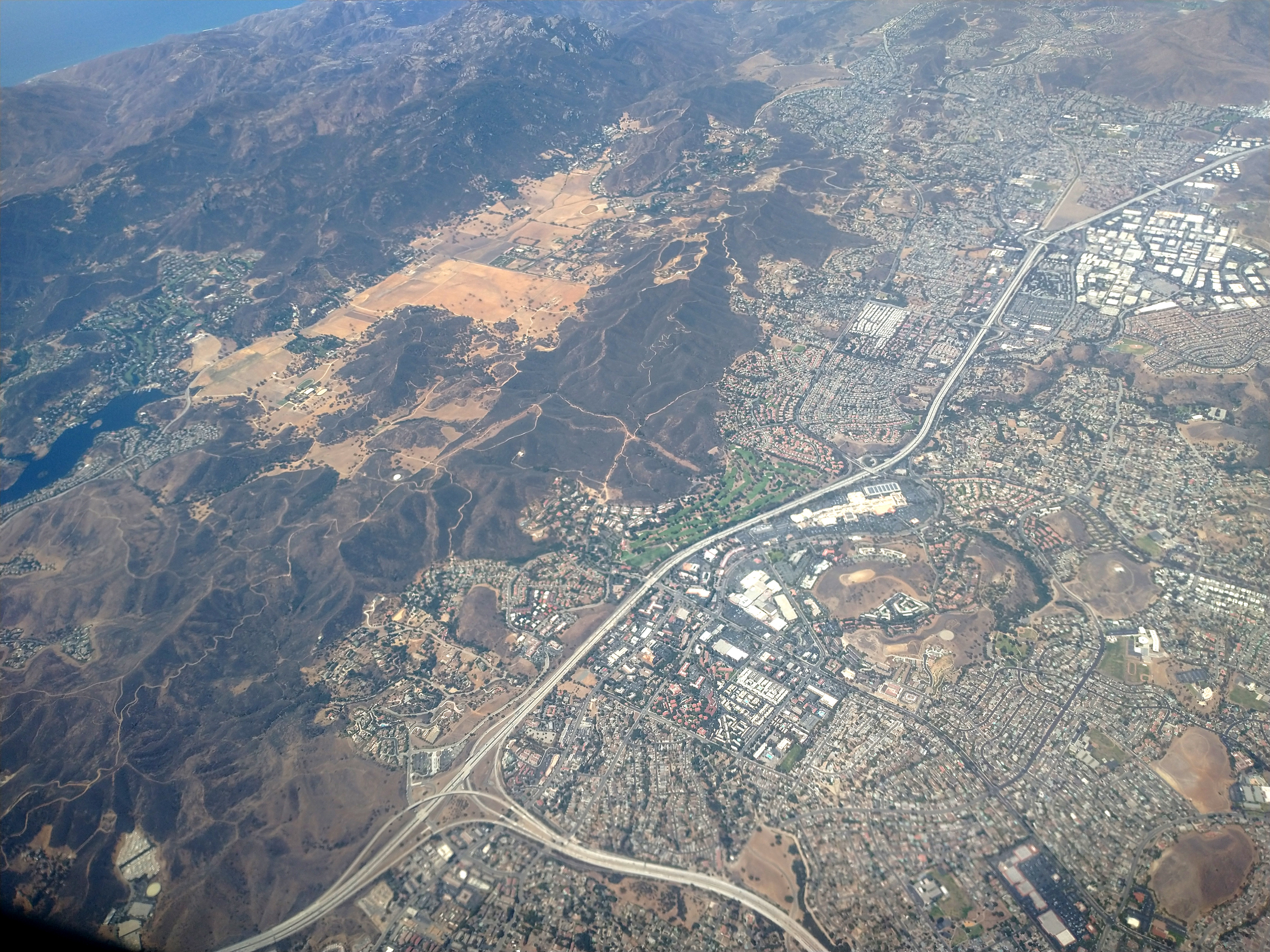
The Oaks (center of photo) and surrounding area in July 2021

== History ==
The mall opened in 1978 and was renovated in 1993. Macerich acquired the mall in 2002. Starting in February 2007, the center underwent an extensive upgrade including interior finishes, restrooms, entrance canopies and skylights to reflect a modern Spanish and Santa Barbara-influenced design. The expansion to 1,300,000-square-foot (120,000 m^{2}), demolished the then-vacated May Company building with a Muvico 14-screen stadium seat theater and Bogarts, a full-service restaurant, built in its place. Additional features include a 10-unit Spanish Dining Hall and amenities like family restrooms with granite, stacked flagstone and limestone tile. Centered on the theatre are four sit-down restaurants: Lazy Dog Cafe and Red Robin, which are both connected to a 112,330-square-foot (10,436 m^{2}) retail expansion in an outdoor environment, while Olive Garden is located across the parking lot. The Cheesecake Factory is located inside the Shopping Center. Stockdale Capital Partners, a real estate investment firm, purchased the mall in late 2024.

== Description ==
It has featured several fashion shows highlighting the latest fashion in the retail stores. The shows were produced by Marilyn Shore Studios.

The Oaks Shopping center also offers a variety of activities for all holidays such as photos with Santa for Christmas, photos with the Easter bunny in April, and handing out candy on Halloween.

The annual ArtWalk presented by Conejo Valley Art Museum takes place at The Oaks. It features arts, designer crafts, outdoor exhibitions and live music.

It is anchored by:

- AMC Theatres Dine-In Thousand Oaks 14 (106,000+ sq ft) (formerly May Co, Robinsons-May East, Carmike Cinemas, and Muvico Theaters)
- J. C. Penney (148,165 sq ft.)
- Macy's / Women / Children's (127,410 sq ft.) (formerly J.W. Robinson's and Robinsons-May West)
- Macy's / Men's / Home (144,000 sq ft.) (formerly Bullock's)
- Nordstrom (138,000 sq ft.) (formerly The Broadway, Macy's Women / Children's (original location))

== Salto Ranch landmarks ==
Several trees planted by Richard Orville Hunt at the 19th century Salto Ranch can be seen at the intersection of Lynn Road and Hillcrest Drive. Hunt Olive Tree, which is located at 600 W. Hillcrest Dr., is designated Ventura County Historical Landmark No. 64 and City of Thousand Oaks Landmark No. 4. It is the last olive tree once part of an orchard planted by Hunt. Large eucalyptus trees planted by the Hunt family in the 1880s can be seen across the street, on the northwest corner of Lynn Road and Hillcrest Drive. The Hunt family originally moved to a house at today's corner of Lynn Road and Hillcrest Drive in 1888.
