= Potrero Ridge Open Space =

- Interactive map of Potrero Ridge Open Space
- Type: Open-space park
- Location: Newbury Park, CA
- Coordinates: 34°09′55.8″N 118°57′28.6″W
- Area: 203 acres (82 ha)
- Operator: Conejo Open Space Conservation Agency (COSCA)
- Status: Open

The Potrero Ridge Open Space is a passive recreation area in the southwestern portion of Newbury Park, CA and the Conejo Valley that encompasses eastern parts of the Potrero Ridge. The open-space area contains a total of 203 acres (82 ha), and is owned and operated by the Conejo Open Space Conservation Agency (COSCA). It is adjacent to the Dos Vientos Open Space in the west, which provides further access to the Santa Monica Mountains National Recreation Area by Satwiwa, as well as the Alta Vista Open Space, Los Vientos Open Space, and Los Robles Trail which leads to Los Robles Open Space in Thousand Oaks, CA and further into Westlake Village.

Conejo Valley’s longest creek, the Conejo Creek (Arroyo Conejo) runs through the western parts of the Potrero Ridge Open Space. Some of the fauna here includes mountain lions, bobcats, coyotes, mule deer, golden eagles, American black bears, and reptiles such as the Western pond turtle and freshwater fish species in the Arroyo Conejo. There are more than ten trailheads to access the open-space area, and some of the flora includes oak woodlands, coastal sage scrub and chaparral. It is home to a wide variety of rare or endangered plant species as well, including Verity's liveforever, Conejo dudleya, and Conejo buckwheat.

“Potrero” means a farm for rearing horses or pasture ground in Spanish.

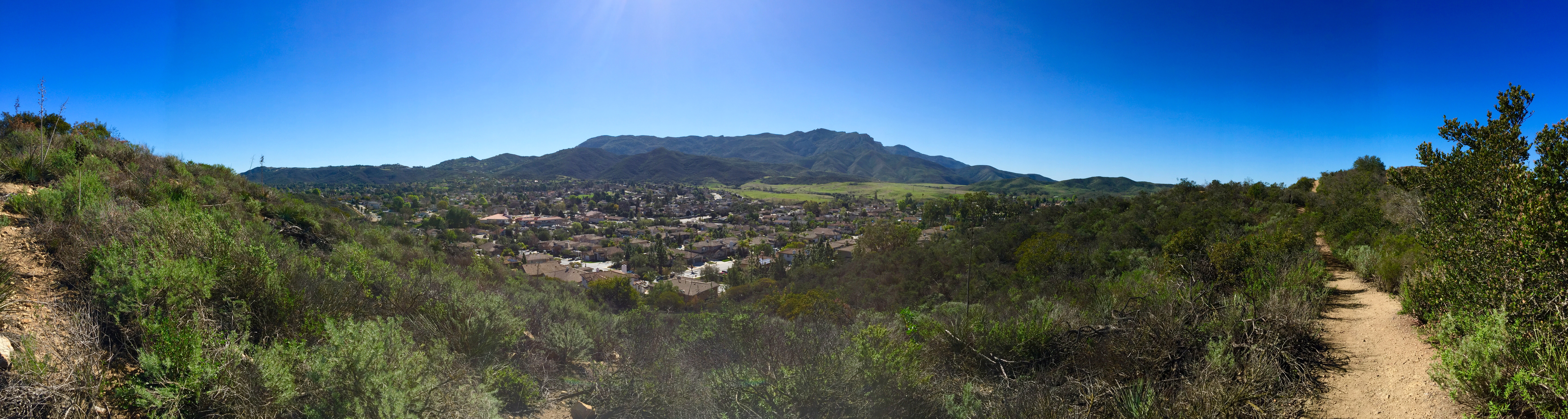
Panoramic view of the Santa Monica Mountains from the Potrero Ridge Trail.
