= Dos Vientos Open Space =

Parkland in Ventura County, California

Coordinates: 34.1689°N 118.9808°W

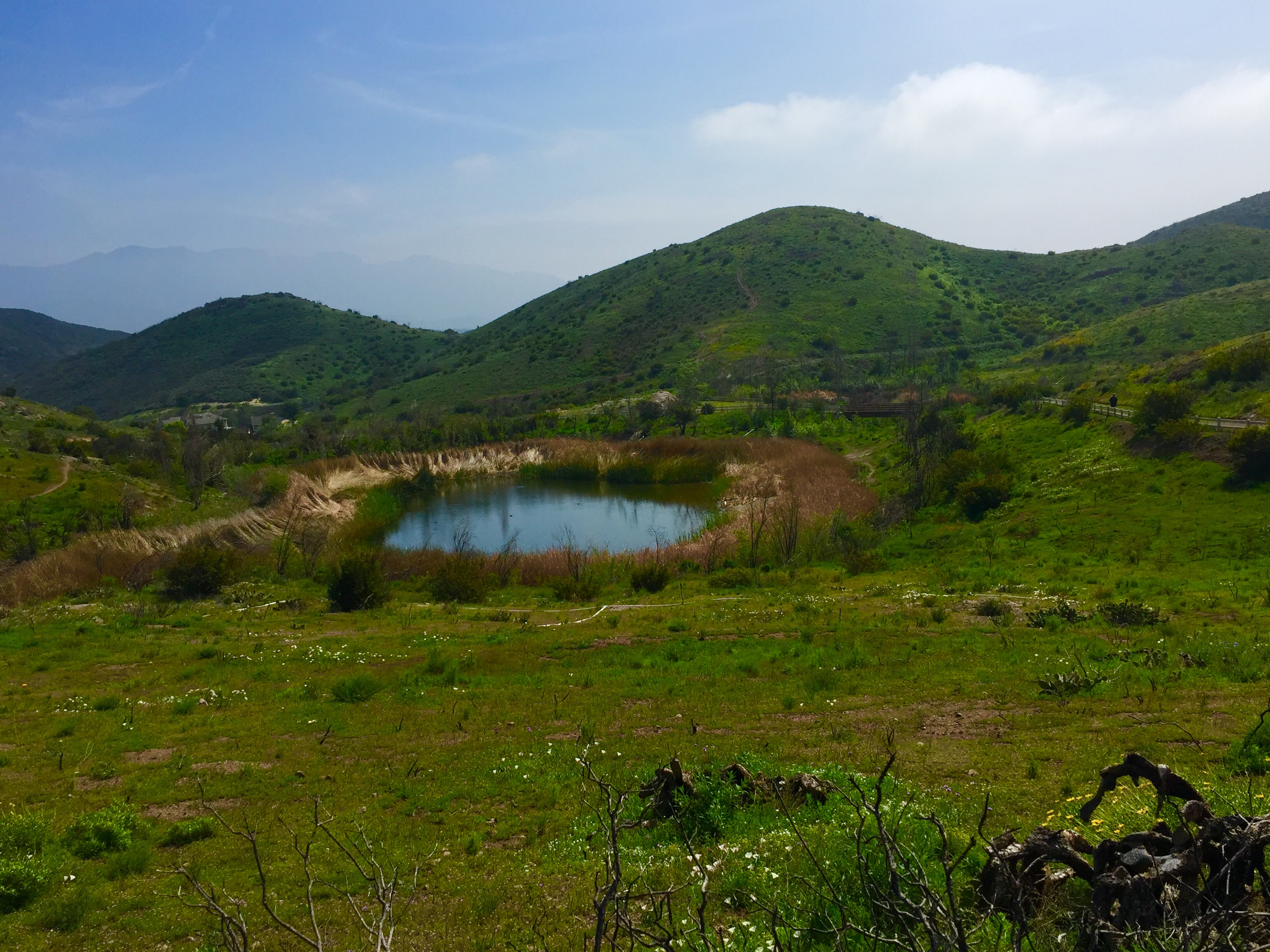
- Twin Ponds by the Dos Vientos Ranch neighborhood
- Interactive map of Dos Vientos Open Space
- Type: Open-space park
- Location: Newbury Park, CA
- Area: 1,216 acres (492 ha)
- Operator: Conejo Open Space Foundation (COSF)
- Status: Open

Dos Vientos Open Space is a 1,216 acres (492 ha) open space area in western Newbury Park, California. It contains more than 41 miles (66 km) of trails used for cycling, hiking and equestrians. Originally a part of the Rancho Guadalasca Spanish Land Grant of 1836, the area is now an important wildlife movement corridor into the Santa Monica Mountains through the Point Mugu State Park. It provides a habitat for a variety of wildlife, including bobcats, mule deer, coyotes, eagles, hawks, barn owls, mountain lions, and more. It provides regional and internal trail connections, many trails offering panoramic views of the Conejo Valley, Oxnard Plain, Topatopa Mountains, Channel Islands, and the Pacific Ocean. Some of the endangered plant species found here include Conejo buckwheat, Verity's liveforever, and Conejo dudleya. The landscape is undeveloped, and dominated by coastal sage scrub, grassy hillsides, oak woodlands, and chaparral habitats.

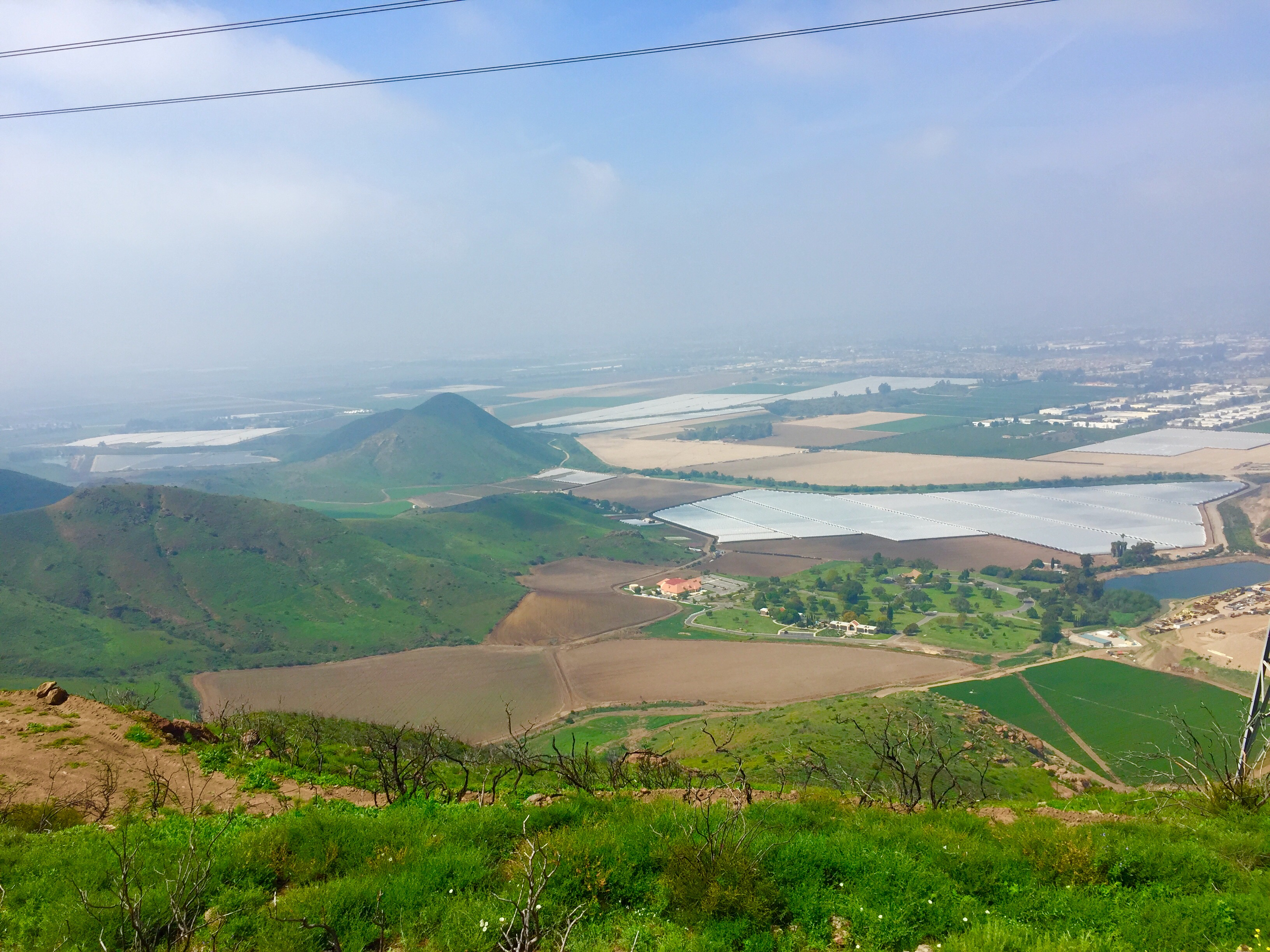
Camarillo as seen from the Vista Del Mar Trail.

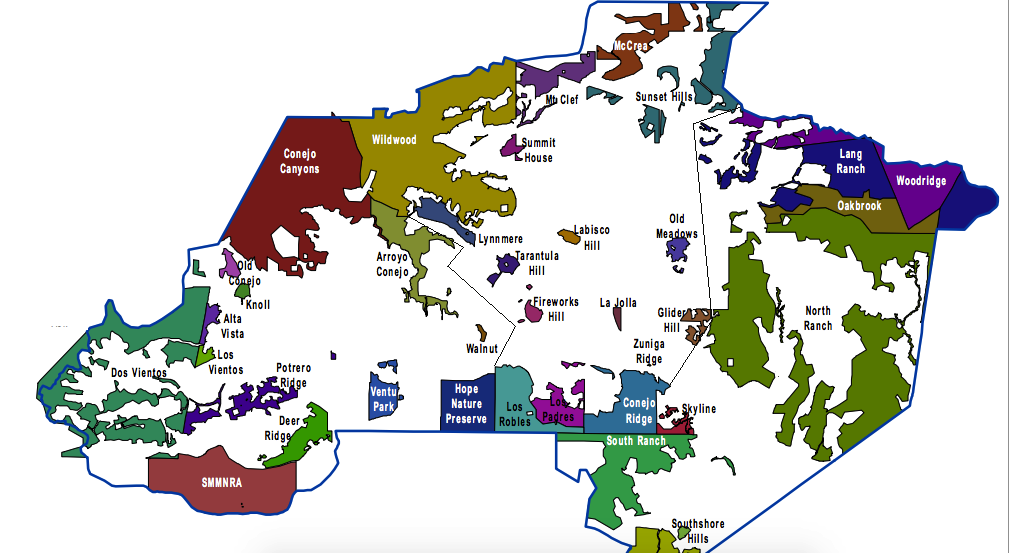
Map of open-space areas in the Conejo Valley, including Dos Vientos to the left.

The only developed area by Dos Vientos is the adjoining Dos Vientos Ranch neighborhood, which was a 2,350-unit housing development approved by the Thousand Oaks City Council in April 1988. It is a master-planned and upscale community. The master plan for the neighborhood was approved in the 1980s, but took off after major infrastructure was built to support the homes in 1998. Wildfires in the area led to evacuation of homes in 2013.

== Recreation ==
Besides numerous trail access points from the Dos Vientos Ranch neighborhood, the primary trailhead and parking lot are located at the Dos Vientos Community Park. Following the Park View Trail at the far end of the community park, one can either cross Via Ricardo to access the Powerline Trail (Edison Road Trail) across the road, which leads to the Conejo Mountain, or one can follow Via Ricardo to the left for 0.1 miles (160 m) before entering the Vista Del Mar Trailhead. The Vista Del Mar Trail climbs up the Conejo Hills with overlook points with panoramic views of the Santa Monica Mountains, Boney Peak, Camarillo, Topatopa Mountains, Pacific Ocean, and the Channel Islands. It leads to Twin Ponds, which is two secluded ponds functioning as a designated conservation area for various migrating waterfowl species, birds such as mallards and ducks, freshwater fish species, as well as the western pond turtle and the two-striped garter snake. The ponds were originally built in the 1920s as part of an irrigation system for ranching and agriculture.

Dos Vientos Open Space is adjacent to the south with Rancho Sierra Vista (Satwiwa), Rancho Potrero, Point Mugu State Park, and the Boney Wilderness. To the east are adjacent open-space areas such as the Alta Vista Open Space, Potrero Ridge Open Space, and the Los Vientos Open Space. The adjoining open-space areas encompasses more than 16,000 acres (6,500 ha) of open-space land. The weather here is cooler compared to most areas in the Conejo Valley, as a result of being closer to the coastal ocean breezes coming from coastal regions.

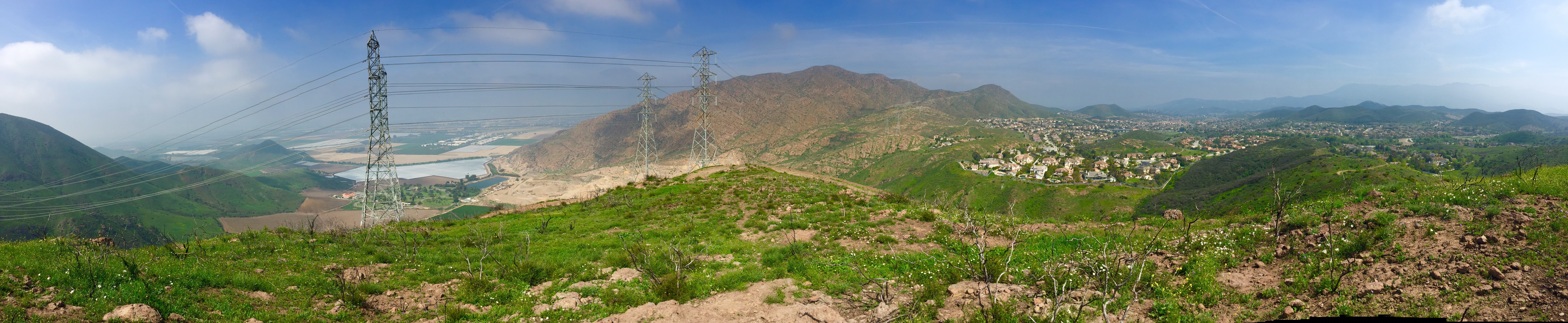
View of the Conejo Mountain in the center, Camarillo to the left and Newbury Park to the right, as seen from the Dos Vientos Open Space.
