= Alta Vista Open Space =

- Interactive map of Alta Vista Open Space
- Type: Open-space area
- Location: 3866 Calle Alta Vista; Newbury Park, CA
- Coordinates: 34°11′15.9″N 118°57′30.2″W
- Area: 43 acres (17 ha)
- Operator: Conejo Open Space Conservation Agency (COSCA)
- Status: Open

Alta Vista Open Space is a 43-acre open-space area in western Newbury Park, California, United States, adjacent to Dos Vientos Open Space and its 1,216 acres of natural open space area and numerous trails. Its primary trail is the Ring Finger Trail, which is reached from its trailhead at the southern side of Calle Alta Vis, directly across the street from Calle Las Collinas. Most of the open-space area is owned by the homeowners association, while eleven acres are owned by the Conejo Open Space Conservation Agency (COSCA). Its flora contain large areas covered with chaparral and coastal sage scrub, while some endangered endemic species include Conejo buckwheat, Verity's dudleya, and Conejo dudleya. It functions as a crucial wildlife corridor into the Santa Monica Mountains National Recreation Area through Point Mugu State Park. Some of the fauna here includes Mountain lions, coyotes, mule deer, bobcats, and more.

Adjacent to more than 16,000 acres of natural open-space areas, Alta Vista Open Space contains numerous internal and regional trail connections, connecting for instance to the Conejo Mountain, Potrero Ridge Open Space, Los Vientos Open Space, Boney Mountain, Satwiwa (Rancho Sierra Vista), Point Mugu State Park, the Conejo Hills, and the Santa Monica Mountains.

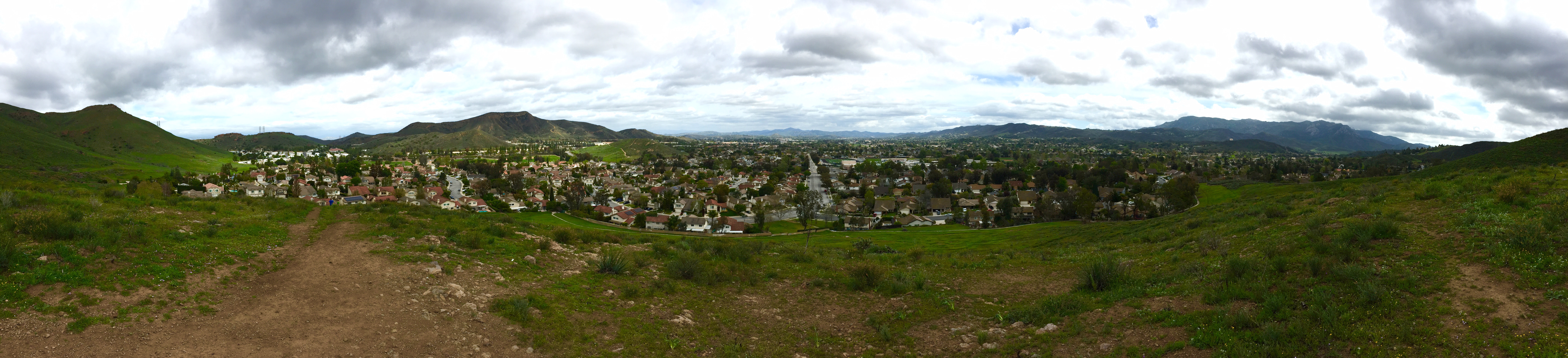
Panoramic view of Newbury Park from Alta Vista Open Space, with the Conejo Grade to the left and the Santa Monica Mountains to the right.
