= Lorence G. Collins =

American petrologist (1931–2025)

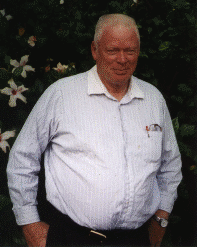

Lorence Gene "Larry" Collins (November 19, 1931 – October 20, 2025) was an American petrologist, known for his research on myrmekite, metasomatism and his opposition to creationist geological pseudo-science.

Collins was a professor emeritus of geological sciences at California State University, Northridge.

== Early life ==
Collins was born on November 19, 1931, in Vernon, Kansas to Floyd Iven Collins and Ethyl Faye Randall. He studied geology at the University of Illinois at Urbana–Champaign, where he earned a bachelor's degree in 1953, a master's degree in 1955, and a Ph.D. in 1959. His thesis dealt with the metasomatic origin of magnetite ore deposits in New York State.

Collins met Barbara Jane Schenck, during his time at the University of Illinois, marrying on February 26, 1955. They had five children. He joined the faculty of San Fernando Valley State College, which later became CSU Northridge (CSUN), in 1959.

== Scientific discoveries ==
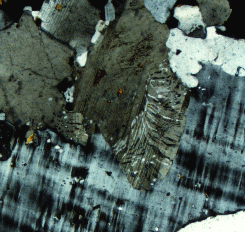
Wartlike myrmekite (center) with tiny quartz vermicules from Temecula, California. Plagioclase in the myrmekite is optically continuous with quartz-free, albite-twinned plagioclase (tan, top). The myrmekite projects into K-feldspar (microcline), black-gray-white, grid-twinning, bottom.

In 1972 Collins started to do research on rocks near Temecula, California. There he came upon the mineral intergrowth called myrmekite where its origin did not fit the usually accepted models as to either being formed by exsolution from primary K-feldspar or by Na- and Ca-metasomatism along the margins of primary K-feldspar. His extensive studies by thin sections, cathodoluminescence, electron microprobe and scanning-electron images supported an entirely different model in which K-metasomatism of primary plagioclase produced the myrmekite. These investigations and the field relationships convinced him of the entirely different origin of myrmekite from that generally believed by most geologists. Following his discovery he subsequently received fierce opposition from the established petrology community. Therefore, he decided to write books, and in 1997 he created his own website and published his findings digitally.

== Scope of scientific research ==
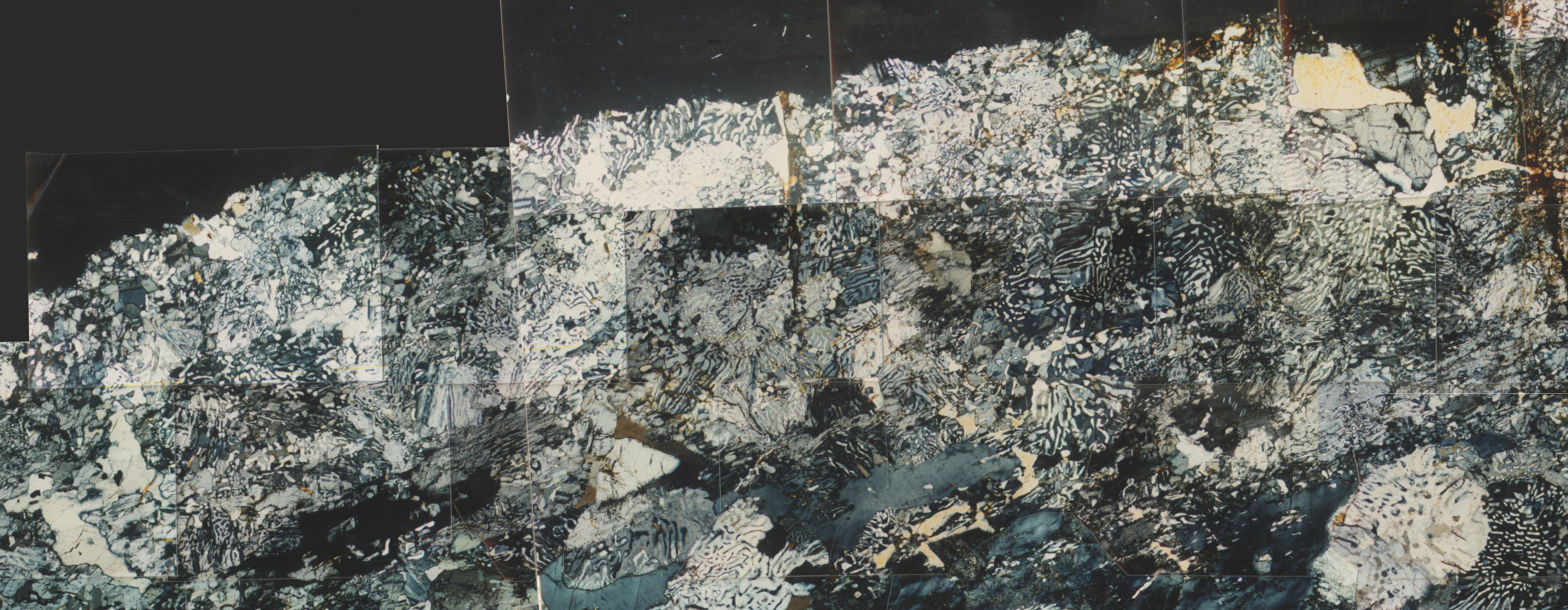
Exceptional myrmekite development from Alastaro, Finland. More than 60 % of the primary K-feldspar crystals have been replaced by Ca-metasomatism.

Since his thesis in New York state, Collins had done a petrological studies in very different geological settings. Having taken roots in California, he naturally centered a lot of his research around the American Southwest, but he also carried out more work on the Northeastern States. Outside the United States he worked in Canada (Alberta, British Columbia and Ontario), in Europe (Finland, Greece, Ireland, Norway and Scotland), in Azerbaijan, in Iran and in Australia.

The rock types Collins worked on were mainly granitoids, gneisses, augen gneisses, mylonites and metasedimentary rocks.

On his website Collins had authored and co-authored more than 50 scientific articles. On this website he summarized his research on the origin of myrmekite and metasomatic granite. In one of his later updates (2018) Collins added to the three known modes of myrmekite origin a newly discovered fourth mode:

- K-metasomatism of primary zoned plagioclase
- Na- and Ca-metasomatism of primary K-feldspar
- Ca-metasomatism of primary relatively-more-sodic plagioclase in anorthosite
- subtraction of Ca and some Na from deformed, primary, zoned plagioclase crystals - occurs in rocks that have been subjected to strong cataclasis.

== Major results ==
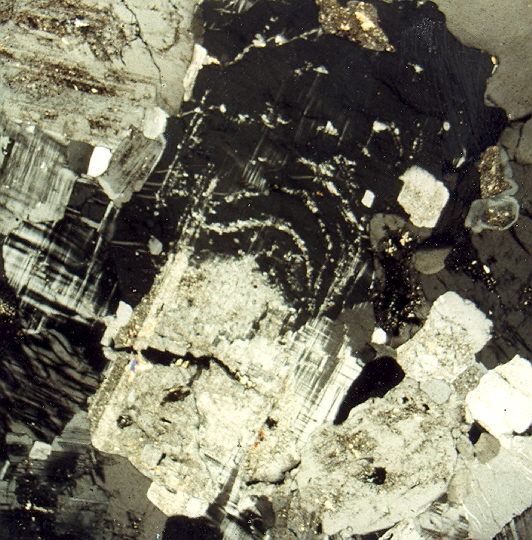
Microcline (top; black and grid-twinned) penetrates and replaces primary plagioclase (bottom; light-gray, speckled, faintly albite-twinned) along an irregular contact, which also includes veins into the plagioclase. Significantly, remnants of the zoning in the plagioclase are preserved in the microcline, which logically would not happen if the two feldspars crystallized simultaneously from a melt.

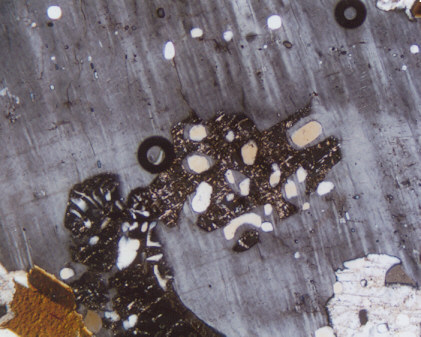
Myrmekite with coarse quartz vermicules (white and cream), enclosed in microcline (grid pattern, light gray). Plagioclase of myrmekite is speckled brown (sericite alteration). Microcline penetrates the plagioclase along fractures and encloses some of the coarse quartz vermicules. Similar-sized or smaller islands of quartz occur in the microcline (top) as ghost myrmekite. Wanup Pluton near Sudbury, Ontario, Canada.

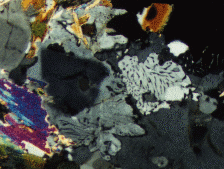
Myrmekite (white and gray with quartz vermicules) bordering orthoclase (gray; right side). Zoned plagioclase with relatively calcic core (dark gray; left side) and broad, more-sodic, myrmekitic rim (light gray). Many colored grains are biotite and muscovite. Cooma granodiorite, Australia.

The results of Collins' research on myrmekite bore directly on the origin of granite (or more generally of granitoids). They can be summarized as follows:

- Collins agreed that most granitoids once were of magmatic origin. Following the cooling path, the magma reached the eutectic and crystallized. But for him the story didn't end here. It is known that feldspars also can form below the eutectic in the temperature range 650 °C to 450 °C. Collins showed that different types of hot metasomatic fluids (especially the K- and Si-bearing solutions), will attack the magmatic structures and alter the primary minerals through replacements (See illustration on the right, a rather obvious example of K-feldspar replacement of zoned plagioclase occurring in the Vrådal pluton in southern Norway). The formation of myrmekite and sieve textures are an indicator, that this process has happened. This replacement process can take on regional dimensions and can lead to progressive changes in rock types from more mafic to more felsic composition. One example was his study on the Wanup Pluton near Sudbury in Ontario, Canada. In this case, the replacement evolved from a diorite–gabbro to quartz monzonite–granodiorite.
- Metasomatic changes likewise operated on heating the country rocks well before true anatexis set in. An example for this is the Cooma granodiorite in southeastern Australia. Here Collins showed how metapelites and metapsammites are metasomatically replaced to form a granodiorite and migmatites. The Cooma granodiorite never reached the melting stage and was formed entirely through replacement processes.
- Collins' work also clearly pointed out the very important role of tectonic deformation in furthering the replacement processes. It is the mechanical breaking-up of primary minerals by means of brittle (cataclasis, faulting) and finally ductile deformations (as in folding, shear zones and mylonites) that allows the metasomatic fluids to become fully effective.
- Note that the maximum size of the quartz vermicules in myrmekite correlates with the Ca content (An value) of the primary plagioclase in rocks outside (adjacent to) the granitic rock containing the myrmekite. This correlation is totally unexpected for models explaining the origin of myrmekite by either exsolution of Ca and Na from primary K-feldspar or by Ca- and Na-replacement of primary K-feldspar.

== Scientific criticism ==
An interesting observation concerns the fierce opposition Collins encountered amongst mainstream petrologists — although there is no doubt, that metasomatic processes can be very effective as is for instance clearly demonstrated in fenites (K-Na-metasomatism) or in skarns. And two final remarks:

- metsasomatism in the mantle (i.e., net-veined peridotite) is continuously being used to explain the origin of enriched basaltic magmas, so if metasomatic processes are assumed to operate in the mantle, why is there such a problem accepting them to happen also in the crust ?
- Na-metasomatism has been accepted, but why not its counterpart K-metasomatism, although both elements behave chemically in a very similar fashion ?

== Polonium halos ==
Polonium (Po) is a natural element which has several different radioactive isotopes, among which are Po-218, Po-214, and Po-210 (with atomic masses of 218, 214, and 210). These isotopes are the last three "daughters" in the eight-step radioactive uranium (U-238) decay scheme before the stable lead isotope (Pb-206) is formed. In each decay step in which a new isotope of different mass is formed, heavy alpha particles (helium nuclei) with an atomic mass of 4 are shot out from the nucleus like high-energy cannonballs. Where polonium is found in biotite mica, these cannonballs damage the biotite lattice to produce a glass that is visible as a black halo, provided that enough polonium (about 1,000,000,000 to 10,000,000,000 Po atoms) is originally present at a nucleation point.

The halo radius of damage is different for each of the different polonium isotopes. Therefore, if three, two, or one of the Po isotopes are present, then three different Po-halo ring-type halos might be present with three rings, two rings, or a single ring. Although Po halos are three of the eight possible halos of damage that are created by eight different daughter isotopes whenever uranium (U-238) is nucleated in zircon or uraninite crystals embedded in a biotite crystal, in some places the three Po halos occur in biotite crystals completely isolated from where uranium has nucleated.

When granite crystallizes from a large body of magma several miles deep in the Earth's crust, the cooling time before biotite first begins to crystallize is thought to be at least 5 million years. On that basis, if the half lives of Po-218, Po-214, and Po-210 are 3.05 minutes, less than 200 microseconds, and 140 days (respectively), no matter how much original polonium could have been present in the initial magma, all these Po isotopes would have decayed to stable lead (Pb-206) long before they could nucleate in late-forming biotite crystals in sufficient quantities to form visible Po halos. Most granite petrologists believe that large bodies of granite must crystallize from magma, therefore this model is the generally accepted theory for the formation of granite.

However, research by Collins suggested that not all granite bodies of large size were formed by crystallization from magma (see Major results section above). In some places granite can form at temperatures below melting conditions where former solidified igneous rocks have been deformed and microfractured to open up the system for movements of fluids. In these places, if uranium is relatively abundant in these rocks, it also releases radioactive radon (Rn-222), which is an inert gas that freely moves through the fractures. Because Rn-222 is the precursor to Po-218, its free movement readily facilitates the natural formation of Po halos. That is, in those places where the former igneous rocks have relatively abundant scattered uranium, during the conversion of these rocks into granite by chemical replacement processes, the open system allows radon gas to migrate in fluids to where biotite is being crystallized or recrystallized and where polonium isotopes derived from the nearby radioactive radon can precipitate in the biotite lattice. Therefore, the three different kinds of Po halos can form naturally in biotite during thousands (or millions) of years while deformation and chemical replacements are occurring without any requirement for instantaneous crystallization. In all these places where Po halos in biotite crystals occurred, Collins had found myrmekite to be associated with the granitic rocks.

Thus, the combination of myrmekite and Po-halos (neither of which can form from a granite magma) became a strong indicator that not all granite bodies of large size needed to be formed from magma. Conclusion: granitoids can be formed not just in one way, but in complementary ways — which was the profound result of Lorence Collins's scientific work.

== Debate on creationism ==
Collins was of the Methodist faith and due to his geological training strongly opposed to creationism — especially Young Earth creationism and flood geology. He had created a section on creationism within his web site in which he discussed various aspects of creationists' theories concerning literal readings of the Bible or supernatural explanations, and each of these was demonstrated to have originated by natural processes or to have a modern science interpretation.Among these articles were three that presented his own Christian philosophy.

Collins was an active member of the United Methodist Church in Thousand Oaks, California, where he frequently served as a Lay Leader.

Lorence Gene Collins, aged 93, of in Thousand Oaks, California, died on October 20, 2025.

== See also ==
- Bible
- Creationism
- Crystallization
- Flood geology
- Granite
- Granitoid
- Eutectic
- Metasomatism
- Magma
- Methodism
- Myrmekite
- Petrology
- Polonium
- Radon
- Solidus
- Symplectite
- Young Earth Creationism

== Scientific publications (selection) ==
- Collins, L. G., and Pohl, R. W., 2023, Appinite — A co-authored paper with Rudolf Pohl on appinites
- Collins, L. G., 2023, Origin of lamprophyres associated with myrmekite-bearing granitic rocks — A paper on the origin of lamprophyres
- Collins, L. G., 2021, Significance of myrmekite — In this article Collins summed up the major results of his research on myrmekite.
- Collins, L. G., 2018, A fourth type of myrmekite origin in early Proterozoic terrane in northeastern Wisconsin
- Lorence G. Collins and Barbara J. Collins, 2012, K-, Na-, and Ca-metasomatism – characteristics of replacement textures associated with feldspars and ferromagnesian silicates and the formation of coexisting rim, wartlike, or ghost myrmekite
- Lorence G. Collins and Barbara J. Collins, Origin of Polonium Halos, Reports of the National Center for Science Education, 2010, v. 30, Issue 5, pp. 11–16
- Collins, L. G., 1997, Muscovite-garnet granites in the Mojave Desert: Relation to crustal structure of the Cretaceous arc: Comment: Geology, v. 25, p. 187.
- Collins, L. G., 1993, The metasomatic origin of the Cooma complex in southeastern Australia: Theophrastus Contributions, v. 1, p. 105-112.
- Collins, L. G., and Davis, T. E., 1992, Origin of high-grade biotite-sillimanite-garnet-cordierite gneisses by hydrothermal differentiation, Colorado; in Augustithis, S. S., ed., High Grade Metamorphics: Athens, Theophrastus Publications, p. 297-338.
- Collins, L. G., 1989a, Origin of the Isabella pluton and its enclaves, Kern County, California: California Geology, v. 42, p. 53-59.
- Collins, L. G., 1988b, Myrmekite, a mystery solved near Temecula, Riverside County, California: Geology, v. 41, p. 276-281.
- Weigand, P. W., Parker, J., and Collins, L. G., 1981, Metamorphic origin of garnets in the Lowe granodiorite, San Gabriel Mtns., California: Transactions of the American Geophysical Union, v. 62, no. 45, p. 1060.
- Collins, L. G., 1971, Manganese and zinc in amphibolite near the Sterling Hill and Franklin Mines, New Jersey: Economic Geology, v. 66, p. 348-350.
- Collins, L. G., 1969b, Host rock origin of magnetite in pyroxene skarn and gneiss and its relation to alaskite and hornblende granite: Economic Geology, v. 64, p. 191-201.
- Collins, L. G., 1966, Finding Rare Beauty In Common Rocks, National Geographic, v. 129, no. 1, January, p. 121-129.
- Collins, L. G., 1959c, Geology of the magnetite deposits and associated gneisses near Ausable Forks, New York: unpublished Ph.D. thesis, University of Illinois, 147 p.

== Opposition to creationism ==
On his opposition to creationism website Collins had released the impressive amount of 142 articles. Cited here is just a small selection:

- Collins, L. G., 2025, Noah’s flood and Ark story
- Collins, L. G., 2024, Critique of video: “Defending the truth of biblical creation” presented by Dr. Grady S. McMurtry

Out of these 142 articles Collins recommended 24 articles that have been written expressively to refute the pseudoscience of Young Earth creationists. Examples are:

- Collins, L. G., 2024, Resources
- Collins, L. G., 2023, Position Statement: Science, Bible, Noah’s Flood, and Evolution

And specifically on flood geology:

- Collins, L. G., Yes, Noah’s Flood May Have Happened, But Not Over the Whole Earth
- Collins, L. G., 2020, Fountains of the Great Deep and Noah's Flood
