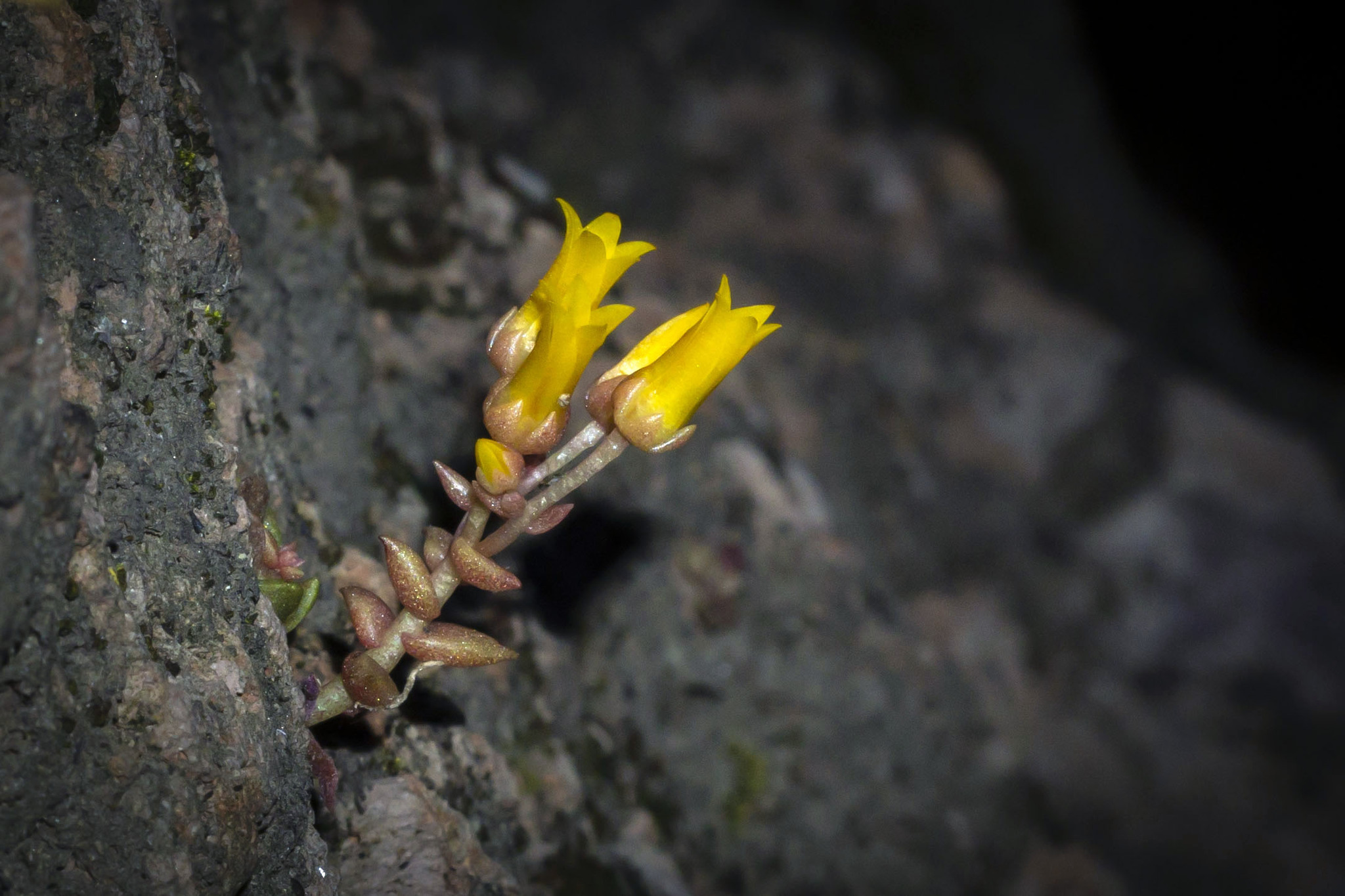
- The typical form of marcescens in flower.

Conservation status
- Imperiled (NatureServe)

Scientific classification
- Kingdom: Plantae
- Clade: Embryophytes
- Clade: Tracheophytes
- Clade: Spermatophytes
- Clade: Angiosperms
- Clade: Eudicots
- Order: Saxifragales
- Family: Crassulaceae
- Genus: Dudleya
- Species: D. cymosa
- Subspecies: D. c. subsp. marcescens

Trinomial name
- Dudleya cymosa subsp. marcescens Moran (1957)

= Dudleya cymosa subsp. marcescens =

Subspecies of deciduous succulent plant

Dudleya cymosa subsp. marcescens is a species of summer-deciduous succulent plant known commonly as the marcescent dudleya or marcescent liveforever. Throughout the months of spring, it is characterized by a bloom of small, bright-yellow flowers with 5 petals, tinged with orange or red. It is a leaf succulent with a basal rosette, with the foliage withering in summer, going completely leafless, a neotenous trait in the genus. This species is endemic to the exposed volcanic rock of the Santa Monica Mountains in California, being found on shady slopes and outcroppings. It differs from its local congeners with its deciduous habit, slender caudex, and narrower leaf shape, although it is superseded in some of these characteristics by Dudleya parva, growing 13 km to the north, which has even narrower leaves and is quicker to lose them. Because of its restricted distribution and small size, it is vulnerable to habitat degradation and disturbance from acts of graffiti and rock climbers. It is listed as threatened by the United States Fish and Wildlife Service.

== Description ==
=== Vegetative morphology ===
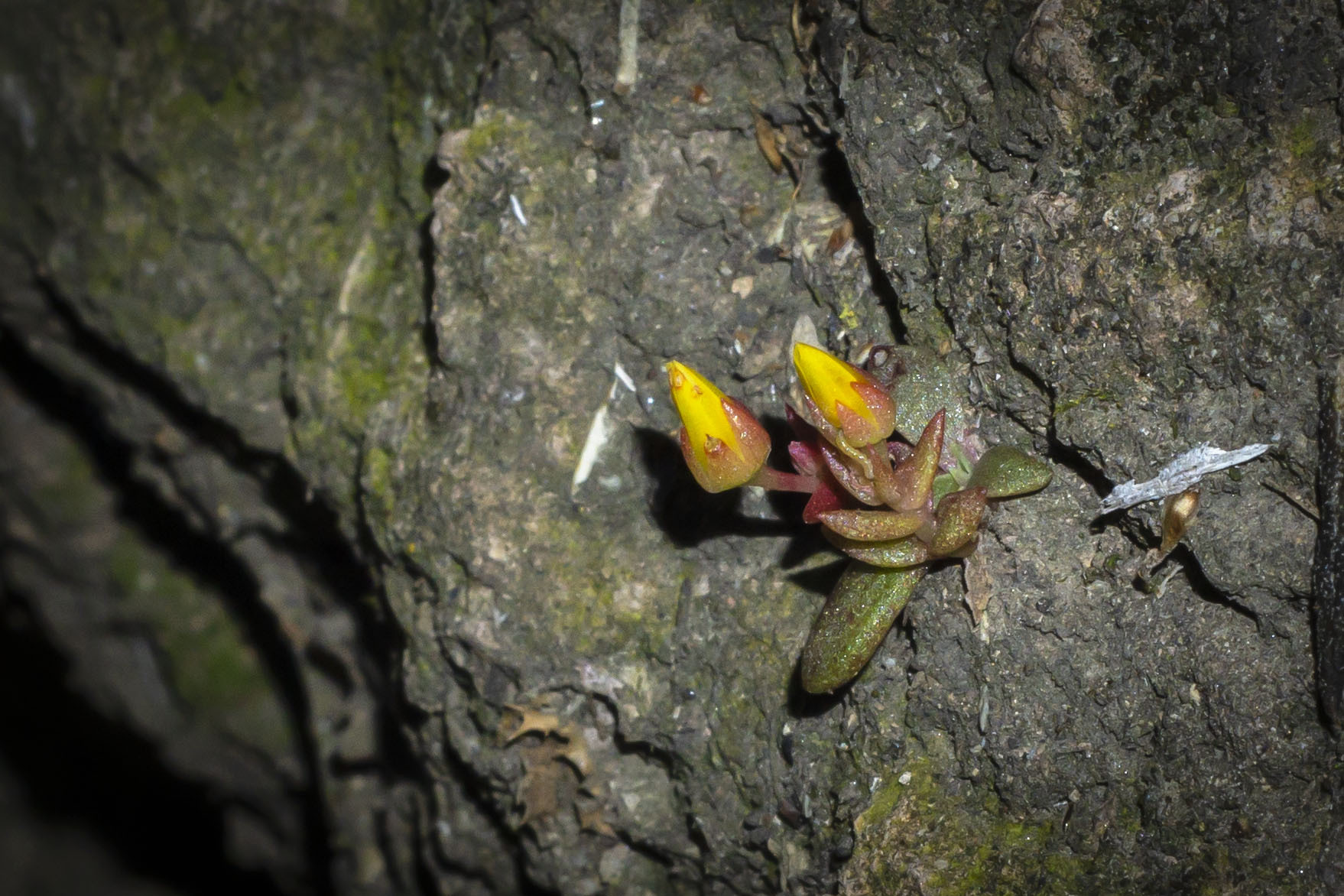
With budding flowers. The plant pictured is around the size of a US penny.

Like most other species of Dudleya, this plant grows from a caudex, used in this context interchangeably with the stem, with rosettes forming on the meristem on the apex of each stem. The stem is 2 to 10 mm (0.079 to 0.394 in) in width, and may sometimes branch to form multiple rosettes, but generally plants have a solitary one. The rosettes are typically 0.5 to 4 cm (0.20 to 1.57 in) wide, covered in succulent leaves. The leaves are deciduous, and wither in the early summer, not being replaced until after the first rains. Each leaf is 1.5 to 4 cm (0.59 to 1.57 in) long by 5 to 12 mm (0.20 to 0.47 in) wide, with an elliptic to elliptic-ovate shape and an acute tip. The leaves may sometimes be covered with a glaucous epicuticular wax, and have a papery texture during the summer months when dry. If a leaf is removed from the plant, it may leave a wound that turns purple-red at the base.

=== Reproductive morphology ===
The inflorescence structure in the genus Dudleya is a cyme, in which the central flowers open prior to the peripheral ones. This species has an inflorescence that is more or less asymmetrical radially. The peduncle is 3 to 10 cm (1.2 to 3.9 in) in height, and 1 to 3 mm (0.039 to 0.118 in) in width. There are 5 to 15 bracts, which are the modified leaves found on the inflorescence, and the lower bracts are plump. The inflorescence branches up to 2 times, with each terminal branch 1 to 3 cm (0.39 to 1.18 in) long, holding 3 to 5 flowers. The petals are 2.5 to 3.5 mm (0.098 to 0.138 in) wide, and colored a bright yellow that is marked with orange or red. Flowering is typically in spring, often occurring from May to June.

== Taxonomy ==
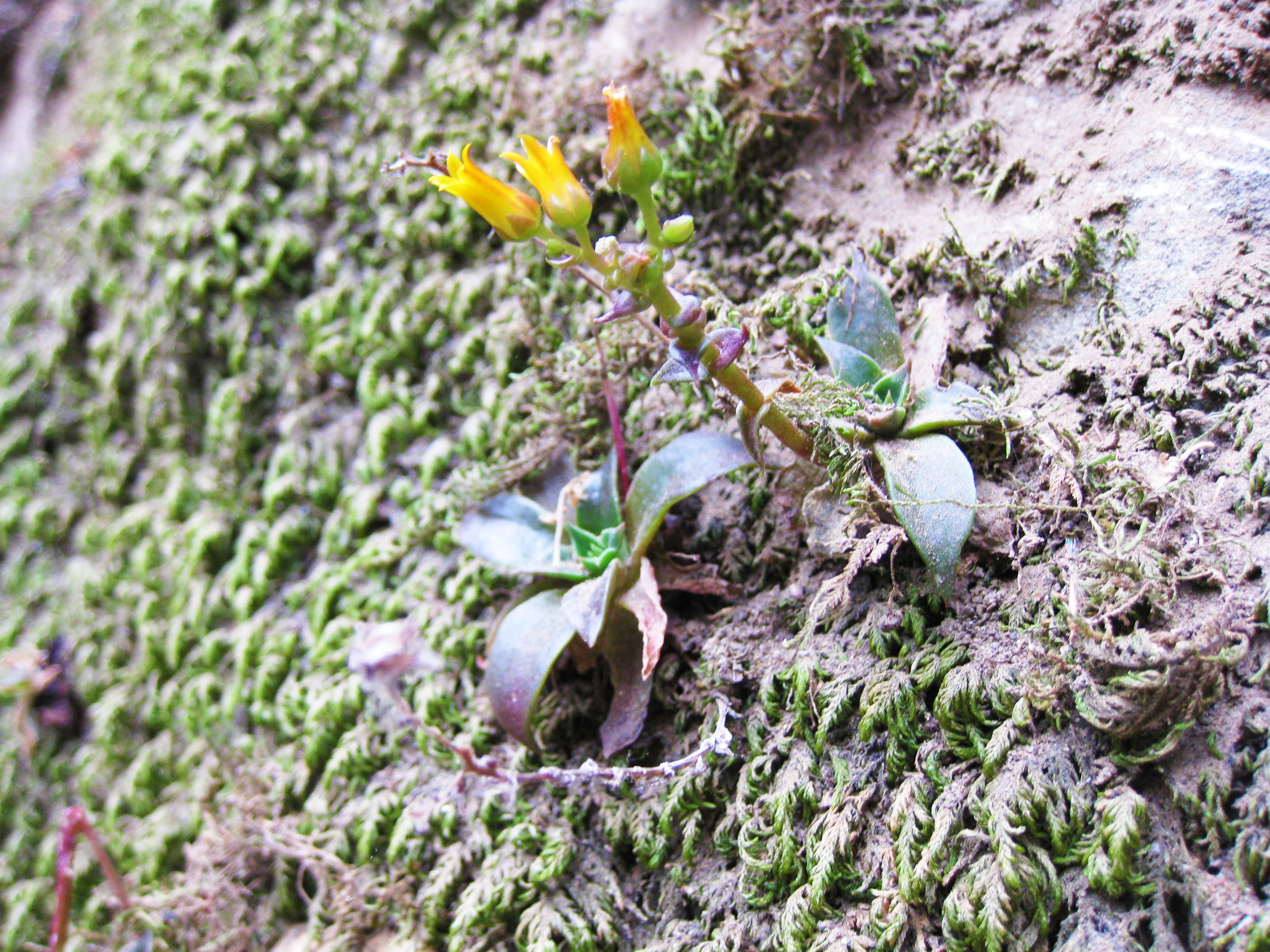
A slightly larger form in flower.

This species was first described by botanist Reid Moran in his 1957 paper "Innovations in Dudleya." Chromosome counts conducted by him and Charles Uhl placed this plant as a diploid with n = 17 chromosomes, which justified his placement of the taxa as a subspecies of Dudleya cymosa. Moran notes that it is a very distinct subspecies, but it is in some respects similar to the local congener Dudleya cymosa subsp. ovatifolia.

This species is unique among the Dudleya because of its deciduous habit, which is not commonly seen with the wide-leaved members of the genus. The only other member with a similar habit is the local Dudleya parva, which occurs 13 km to the north. Compared to this species, D. parva has paler yellow petals, narrower leaves, much shorter pedicels, and loses its leaves much quicker. Both are diploids.

It is believed that the unusual deciduous habit of Dudleya parva and this species is a neotenous trait, which is common in the genus with other taxa like Dudleya blochmaniae and Dudleya variegata. This neoteny is carried to the most extreme limit by Dudleya brevifolia, whose adult rosette leaves are the same as the juvenile leaves encountered across the genus.

== Distribution and habitat ==
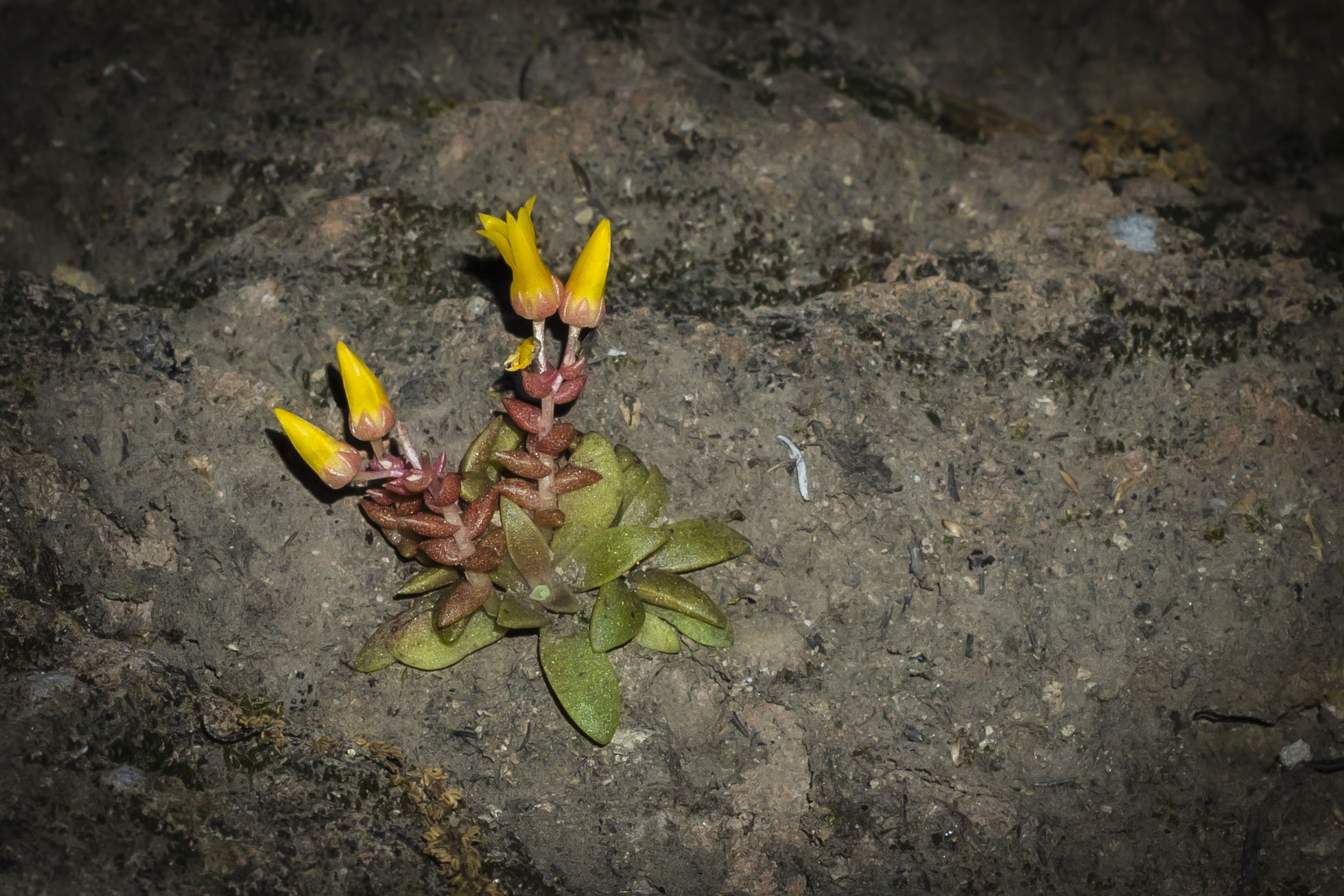
Starting to flower.

This species is endemic to California in the United States, where it is found in the Santa Monica Mountains and Malibu Creek area. It is restricted to thin soils on exposed volcanic substrates, from 150 to 500 m (490 to 1,640 ft). Plants of this species are typically found on north-facing shaded slopes and outcroppings, growing with moss and lichens. The habitat of this species is threatened by growing degradation, and by disturbances caused from recreational activities, particularly in Malibu Creek State Park. These disturbances are often from people making graffiti and rock climbers, who tear out the moss and lichens vital to the habitat. Because of this, it is listed as a threatened species by the United States Fish and Wildlife Service.
