= Barbara Collins =

Barbara Collins may refer to:

- Barbara J. Collins (1929–2013), author, ecologist, geologist and botanist, and professor
- Barbara-Rose Collins (1939–2021), politician from Michigan
