= Barbara J. Collins =

American writer, ecologist, geologist, botanist

Barbara Jane Collins (born Schenck; April 29, 1929 - April 30, 2013) was an American writer, ecologist, geologist, botanist, and professor. She was the founder of the Barbara Collins Arboretum at the campus of California Lutheran University where she was a professor for 50 years. She was instrumental in the preservation of Wildwood Mesa and received a commendation from the Mayor of Thousand Oaks, California for her preservation efforts. At Cal Lutheran, she created a website which cataloged over 3,000 plant species and was the sole member of the Interdisciplinary Major Committee for thirty years. She was among the first faculty at both California Lutheran University (CLU) and California State University, Northridge (CSUN). Collins was also the first woman to earn a doctoral degree in geology from the University of Illinois.

== Awards ==
Collins received the national Sears Roebuck Foundation Teaching Excellence and Campus Leadership Award in 1991. She was named Professor of the Year in 1996 and received the President's Award for Teaching Excellence in 2007. She later received an Honorary Alumna Award from Cal Lutheran's Alumni Association in 2008. Collins was inducted into the Ventura County Educators' Hall of Fame in 2013.

== Early life and education ==
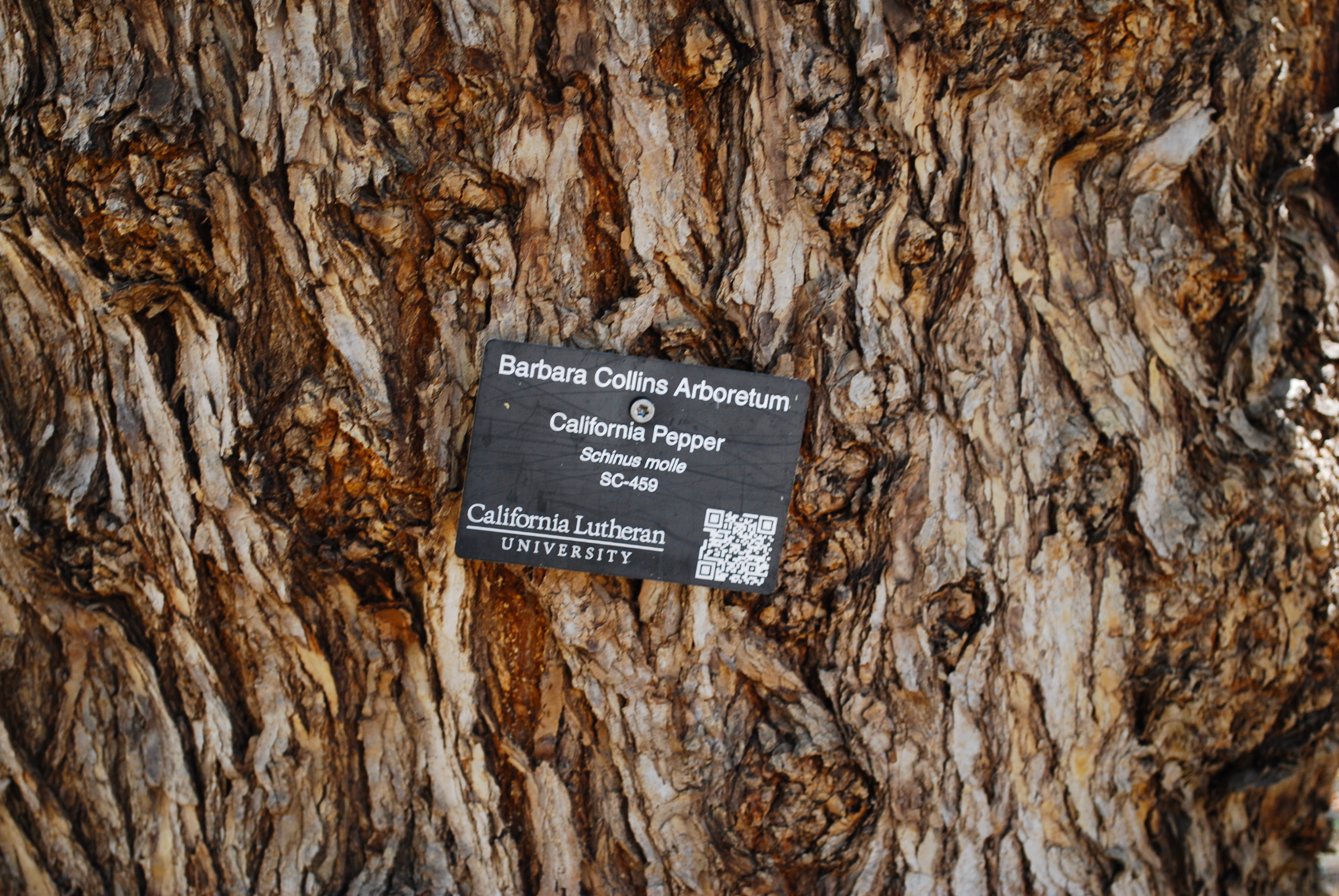
Barbara Collins Arboretum at California Lutheran University

Born in Passaic, New Jersey on April 29, 1929, she grew up in Nutley, New Jersey. Collins earned a bachelor's degree from Bates College and a Master of Arts from Smith College. She was the first female to earn a doctorate in geology from University of Illinois at Urbana–Champaign, where she also completed her Master of Science and doctorate in botany after two years in Germany.

== Career ==
She joined the faculty at San Fernando Valley State College, which later became California State University, Northridge, soon after it was founded in 1958. After three years of teaching botany at SFVSC, she became one of the first faculty members at California Lutheran College in 1963. During her tenure at Cal Lutheran she brought her students along on scientific trips to Hawai'i, Fiji, New Zealand, Australia, and deserts and mountains of California. She also created an online directory for the university which included over 3,000 species. Collins also identified over a hundred plants for the university's arboretum, which is named in honor of Collins.

In the mid-1980s, she helped with the preservation of Wildwood Mesa by discovering three endangered species in an area which was about to be developed: Conejo dudleya, Conejo buckwheat and Lyon's pentachaeta. The city and the Conejo Recreation and Park District eventually gained control of 228 acres of the Wildwood Mesa, which was consolidated with the existing Wildwood Regional Park. Collins received a commendation from the city mayor for her preservation efforts.

== Personal life ==
Collins was married to the noted geologist Larry Collins until her death in 2013. Together they had five children.

== Literary works ==
- California Plant and Animal Communities (1967)
- Story of Our Earth (1967)
- Exploring and Understanding Beyond the Solar System (1970)
- Exploring and Understanding Insects (1970)
- Exploring and Understanding the Human Body (1971)
- Wildflowers, Trees, and Shrubs of Holden Village (1972)
- Key to Coast and Chaparral Flowering Plants of Southern California (1972)
- Key to Trees and Wildflowers of the Mountains of Southern California (1974)
- Key to Trees and Shrubs of the Deserts of Southern California (1976)
- Key to Wildflowers of the Deserts of California (1979)
- Central Coast Wildflowers: Monterey, San Luis Obispo, & Santa Barbara Counties of California (1993)
- You Lead A Mean Trail: Life Adventures and Fifty Years of Teaching (2012)
- The Twilight Years and Looking Back (2014)
