= Myrmekite =

Tiny intergrowths of quartz and feldspar in rocks

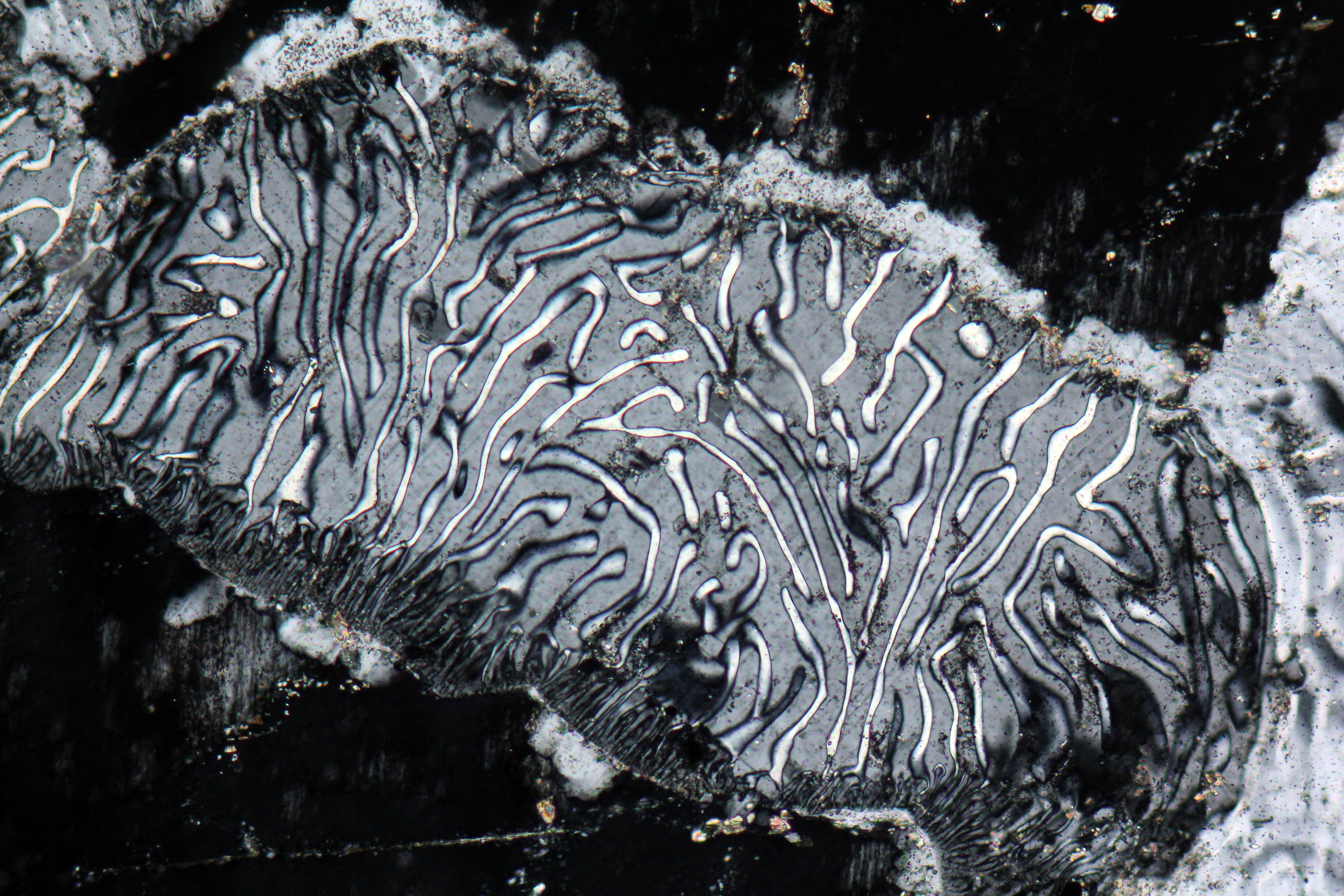
Myrmekite, about 2 millimetres across

Myrmekite is a vermicular, or wormy, intergrowth of quartz in plagioclase. The intergrowths are microscopic in scale, typically with maximum dimensions less than 1 millimeter. The plagioclase is sodium-rich, usually albite or oligoclase. These quartz-plagioclase intergrowths are associated with and commonly in contact with potassium feldspar. Myrmekite is formed under metasomatic conditions, usually in conjunction with tectonic deformations. It has to be clearly separated from micrographic and granophyric intergrowths, which are magmatic.

== Etymology ==
The word myrmekite is derived from the Ancient Greek μὑρμηχἰα (wart) or μὑρμηξ (ant) and was used by Jakob Sederholm in 1899 for the first time to describe these structures.

== Myrmekite formed during K-metasomatism ==
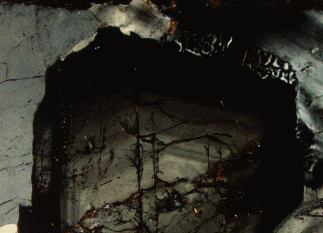
Rim myrmekite on zoned plagioclase against interstitial microcline (gray and black)

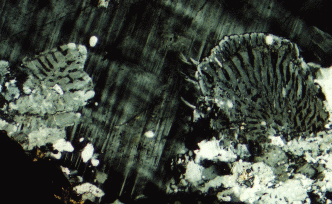
Wartlike myrmekite in megacrystal quartz monzonite from Twentynine Palms, California

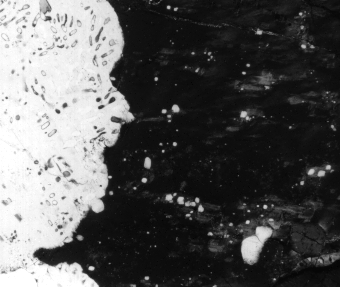
Ghost myrmekite in Mount Rubidoux leucogranite

During K-metasomatism of plagioclase several different types of myrmekite can appear:

- rim myrmekite
- wartlike myrmekite
- ghost myrmekite

=== Rim myrmekite ===
This is the initial stage of K-metasomatism in cataclastically-deformed magmatic plutonic rocks. The breakage happens primarily along grain boundary seals and the K-metasomatism may locally replace rims of zoned plagioclase crystals to form interstitial alkali feldspar and rim myrmekite (see illustration).

=== Wartlike myrmekite ===
When tectonic strains increase and the cataclasis becomes more intense interior breakage in the crystals ensues and albite-twinned plagioclase crystals are bent. The K-metasomatism therefore can reach deeper into the crystals and increase its effects. Nearly complete to complete replacement of plagioclase takes place and leads to the formation of wartlike myrmekite in places where the replacement was incomplete. The illustration shows tartan-twinned microcline having completely replaced plagioclase. The places with incomplete replacement are taken up by wartlike myrmekite.

Gradations occur from rocks containing exclusively rim myrmekite to those containing both rim myrmekite and wartlike myrmekite and finally to those containing exclusively wartlike myrmekite.

A very important observation is that the maximum coarseness (tubular diameter) of the quartz vermicules shows a strong correlation with the Ca content of the plagioclase in the original, unreplaced, non-myrmekite-bearing magmatic rock. The coarsest vermicules occur in the metasomatized rock where the original plagioclase was the most calcic.

An example for the formation of wartlike myrmekite can be found at the Twentynine Palms, California quartz monzonite which issued from an older, yet undated diorite.

=== Ghost myrmekite ===
This is the third type of quartz-feldspar intergrowth in metasomatic granitoids. Again this process depends on tectonically deformed crystals. In this particular case an irregular subtraction of Ca, Na and Al from deformed plagioclase happens which causes an imbalance in the relative amounts of residual Al and Si. More Si remains than can fit into the lattice structure of the alkali feldspar that replaces the plagioclase. The result is ghost myrmekite – either as tiny quartz ovoids in remnant albite islands in the alkali feldspar or as tiny quartz ovoids as clusters without albite hosts in the alkali feldspar (see illustration).

Examples for this structure are found in California in the Mount Rubidoux leucogranite and in granodiorites in the Sierra Nevada.

== Myrmekite formed during Ca-metasomatism ==
During Ca- metasomatism myrmekite can be formed under different circumstances:

- Ca-metasomatism of deformed K-feldspar in magmatic rocks
- Ca-metasomatism of deformed K-feldspar in charnockites
- Ca-metasomatism of deformed plagioclase in anorthosites

=== Ca-metasomatism of deformed K-feldspar in magmatic rocks ===
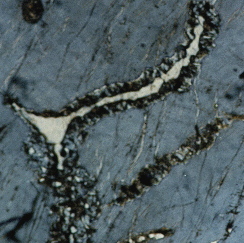
Fractured alkali feldspar filled with central quartz and myrmekite during Ca-metasomatism

Here Ca-bearing fluids enter primary alkali feldspar through cracks and react with the alkali feldspar. Through this reaction cracks are filled with quartz and myrmekite. The replacement reactions can affect large portions (> 60%) of the primary alkali feldspar. An important distinctive feature of this type of myrmekite formation is the constant thickness of the vermicules, whereas in the K-metasomatism their thickness changes as a function of the Ca-content of the plagioclase and they also taper towards the alkali feldspar.

An example for this type of Ca-metasomatism is found in a megacrystal granite near Alastaro in Finland.

=== Ca-metasomatism of deformed K-feldspar in charnockites ===
The process stays the same, the only difference being the country rocks the Ca-bearing fluids act upon. Charnockites distinguish themselves from ordinary granitoids by the appearance of orthopyroxene (hypersthene) and can also be of metamorphic origin.

An example for this type of Ca-metasomatism is found in Sri Lanka.

=== Ca-metasomatism of deformed plagioclase in anorthosites ===
In this type of Ca-metasomatism instead of the alkali feldspar it is the ubiquitous plagioclase that gets attacked by the Ca-bearing fluids. The resulting myrmekite also shows vermicules with constant thickness but unlike in the first case the vermicules formed in anorthosites can taper locally to the primary, non-quartz-bearing plagioclase. This behaviour can be explained by the incorporation of Na demanding more silica in the feldspar lattice.

Examples are found in layered igneous complexes.

== Myrmekite formed during Na-Ca-metasomatism ==
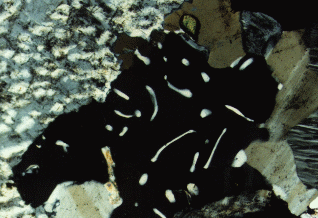
Myrmekite replacing K-feldspar in perthite during Na-Ca-metasomatism, showing isolated quartz vermicules of irregular shape. Lyon Mountain granite gneiss, Ausable Forks, New York

A first variety of this type of metasomatism affects only enclaves within a granitoid. Here the influx of Na-rich fluids in the temperature range 450 °C to 650 °C from the host leads to the replacement of alkali feldspar by myrmekite within the enclaves. During this process a reequilibration with the Na-poorer feldspars (plagioclase) in the enclaves takes place. As a consequence Ca gets released in plagioclase which in turn can now react upon K-feldspar to form myrmekite. Basically this process is very similar to the Ca-metasomatism on K-feldspar described above except for the Na-fluids acting as a trigger.

An example is the Velay granite in the northeastern Massif Central in France.

In the second variety Na- and Ca-bearing fluids truly act together. This leads via the replacement of primary K-feldspar (perthitic and non-perthitic microcline) to the formation of plagioclase (albite or oligoclase) and in certain places also to the formation of myrmekite. The myrmekite does not show wartlike tapering vermicules, but vermicules that are nearly constant in size because the host plagioclase containing the quartz vermicules has nearly a constant Na/Ca composition. These vermicules are confined and scattered entirely within the interior of the plagioclase forming irregular spindles, arcuate patterns and ovals.

For this process to operate it is important that Ca is sufficiently present so that a fairly calcic plagioclase can be formed which in turn releases enough silica for the myrmekite vermicules. If only Na is present then no myrmekite will form.

An example can be found in the Lyon Mountain granite gneiss north of Ausable Forks in New York.

== Myrmekite formed during progressive deformation ==
During progressive deformation in mylonitic, ductile shear zones myrmekite is commonly concentrated in shortening quarters in the rim of sigmoidal K-feldspar crystals. Simpson and Wintsch (1989) explain the asymmetric distribution of myrmekite by a preferential proceeding of the K-feldspar breakdown reaction at sites of high differential stress (stress-concentration sites) during retrograde metamorphism. Internally the arrangement of the quartz vermicules in the myrmekites also shows a monoclinic symmetry, which independently can serve as an internal shear sense indicator. Asymmetric myrmekite is therefore a quarter structure.

Yet Lorence G. Collins does not agree with the assumption of the K-feldspar being primary magmatic and the myrmekite being formed due to deformation-induced Na-Ca-metasomatism. His sampling beyond the shear zone revealed an undeformed, felsic biotite diorite whose primary plagioclase was being replaced from the inside out by K-feldspar due to K-metasomatism. The deformations were therefore more or less continuous and had not only affected the shear zone but also the older plutonic country rocks, thence bringing about a metasomatic change in mineralogy.

== Occurrence ==
Myrmekite can appear in many different rock types and different geologic settings. Typically it occurs in granites and similar igneous rocks (granitoids, diorites, gabbros) and in metamorphic gneisses similar to granite in composition. It can also occur in mylonites, in anorthosites and the orthopyroxene-bearing charnockites.

== Formation ==
These characteristic intergrowths have been explained in a variety of ways:

- One explanation is Castle & Lindsley's exsolution silica-pump model. Accordingly, the texture was created as plagioclase formed by exsolution from alkali feldspar during cooling, under conditions in which silicon was mobile in the rock. The process does not require that magma be present during myrmekite formation.
- L.G. Collins explains the formation of myrmekite by:
  - the K-metasomatic replacement of deformed primary plagioclase by secondary K-feldspar
  - different varieties of Ca- and Na-Ca-metasomatism acting mainly upon deformed primary alkali feldspar, an exception being the replacement of deformed plagioclase in anorthosite.

== See also ==
- Granophyre
- Rock microstructure
- Granite
- Eutectic
- Solidus
- Symplectite
