= Micrographic texture =

In petrology, micrographic texture is a fine-grained intergrowth of quartz and alkali feldspar, interpreted as the last product of crystallization in some igneous rocks which contain high or moderately high percentages of silica. Micropegmatite is an outmoded terminology for micrographic texture.

This fine-grained texture is similar to the coarser intergrowths in certain pegmatites and coarse granitic veins; the quartz forms angular patches scattered through a matrix of feldspar. In polarized light the separate areas of each mineral extinguish at the same time, and this proves that, even though apparently discontinuous, they have the same crystalline orientation.

The feldspar may be considered an irregular crystal of spongy structure, the interstices being filled up by another spongy crystal of quartz. Some of the coarser-grained examples are said to be "graphic", because the intergrowths vaguely resemble ancient cuneiform lettering. Some micrographic intergrowths are similar to those characteristic of granophyre.

Micrographic differs from graphic granite in being so much finer-grained that the texture can only be seen in a petrographic thin section with a microscope. The feldspar is usually orthoclase, but can also be albite, oligoclase or microcline. In at least some instances, quartz is so disposed that the two minerals have a definite relation between their crystallographic axes.

In rocks where micrographic texture is most common, it is usually interpreted as the last product of crystallization, and may represent residual melt. Commonly it has no definite form of its own, but fills up the irregular interspaces between the earlier crystallized minerals. The compositions of these residual crystallization products may represent eutectic compositions, the mixtures (quartz plus feldspar plus minor amounts of other minerals) which have the lowest fusion point. The texture may commonly form in the presence of a vapor phase as well as a silicate melt, however, and vapor-rock reactions below the solidus may result in feldspar replacement and consequent compositional changes.

The texture should not be confused with myrmekite or granophyre, in which quartz forms club-shaped, curved or vermiform threads intergrown with plagioclase feldspar and alkali feldspar, respectively.

In some rocks the whole groundmass consists of spherulitic growths of fibrous quartz and feldspar; in their centres there is often a quartz or feldspar crystal; the outer boundaries of the spherulites are not usually circular but irregular, owing to the interlocking of adjacent spherulites at their margins. Such textures may document solid-state devitrification of glass.

== See also ==
- Granophyre – Type of subvolcanic rock
- Rock microstructure – Relationship between materials which compose a rock
- Eutectic – Mixture with a lower melting point than its constituents
- Solidus – Melting points of chemical mixtures
- Symplectite
