= Symplectite =

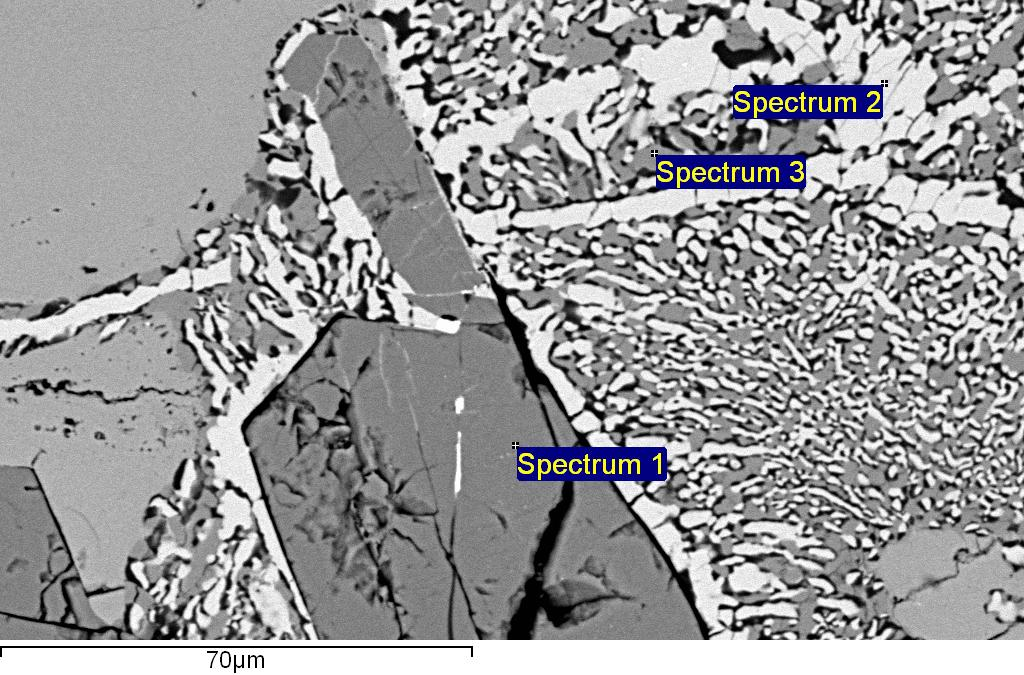
Scanning Electron Microscope interface image of a fayalite-pyroxene symplectite (at right) in a Martian meteorite

A symplectite (or symplektite) is a material texture: a micrometre-scale or submicrometre-scale intergrowth of two or more crystals. Symplectites form from the breakdown of unstable phases, and may be composed of minerals, ceramics, or metals. Fundamentally, their formation is the result of slow grain-boundary diffusion relative to interface propagation rate.

If a material undergoes a change in temperature, pressure or other physical conditions (e.g., fluid composition or activity), one or more phases may be rendered unstable and recrystallize to more stable constituents. If the recrystallized minerals are fine grained and intergrown, this may be termed a symplectite. A cellular precipitation reaction, in which a reactant phase decomposes to a product phase with the same structure as the parent phase and a second phase with a different structure, can form a symplectite. Eutectoid reactions, involving the breakdown of a single phase to two or more phases, neither of which is structurally or compositionally identical to the parent phase, can also form symplectites.

Symplectites may be formed by reaction between adjacent phases or to decomposition of a single phase. The intergrown phases may be planar or rodlike, depending on the volume proportions of the phases, their interfacial free energies, the rate of reaction, the Gibbs free energy change, and the degree of recrystallization. Lamellar symplectites are common in retrogressed eclogite. Kelyphite is a symplectite formed from the decomposition of garnet. Myrmekite is a globular or bulbous symplectite of quartz in plagioclase.

Examples of symplectites formed in Earth materials include dolomite + calcite, aragonite + calcite, and magnetite + clinopyroxene. Symplectite formation is important in metallurgy: bainite or pearlite formation from the decomposition of austenite, for example.

Symplectites have also been recognized in lunar basalts and Martian basaltic meteorites forming from the breakdown of pyroxferroite. In these cases, a three-phase and two-phase assemblage has been observed. The three-phase assemblage is composed of hedenbergitic pyroxene, fayalitic olivine, and an SiO2 polymorph. The two-phase assemblage is composed of only fayalitic olivine and an SiO2 polymorph.

== See also ==
- Granophyre
- Micrographic texture
