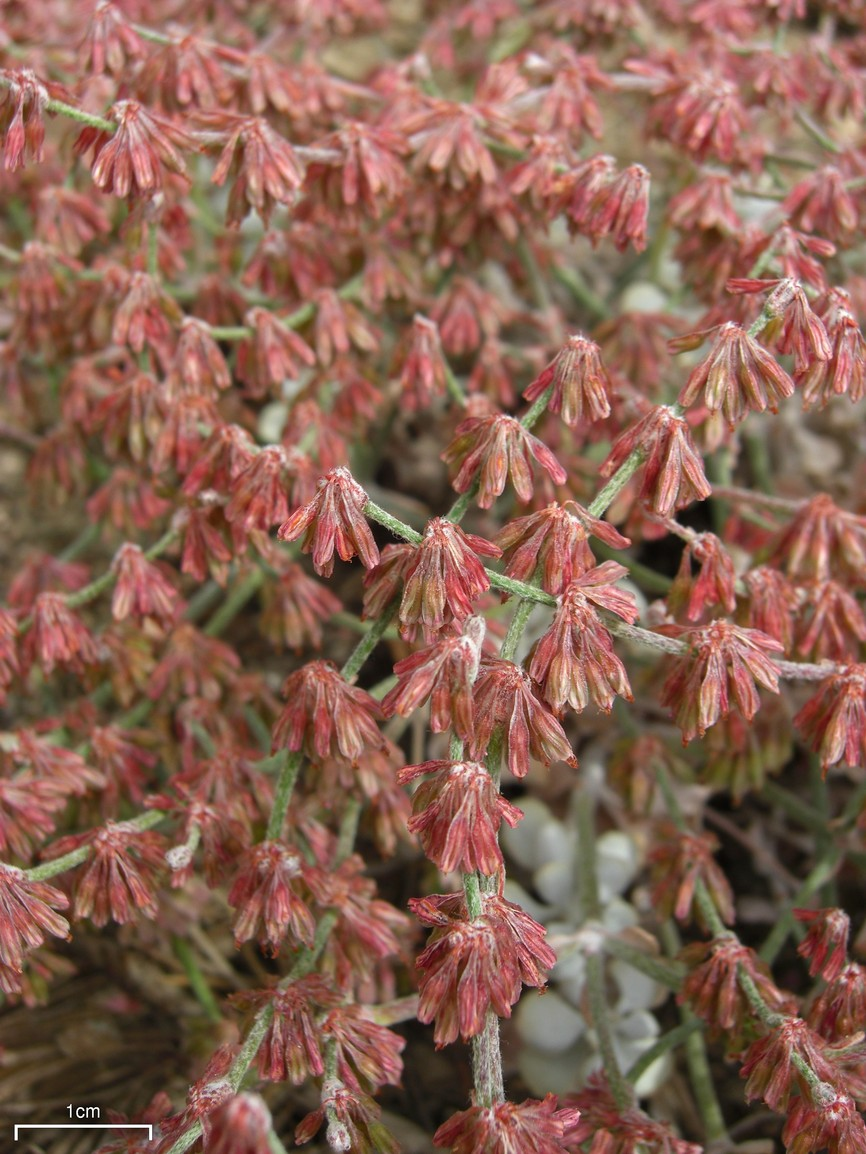

Scientific classification
- Kingdom: Plantae
- Clade: Tracheophytes
- Clade: Angiosperms
- Clade: Eudicots
- Order: Caryophyllales
- Family: Polygonaceae
- Genus: Eriogonum
- Species: E. saxatile

Binomial name
- Eriogonum saxatile S.Wats.

= Eriogonum saxatile =

Species of wild buckwheat

Eriogonum saxatile is a species of wild buckwheat known by the common name hoary buckwheat. It is native to the dry, rocky mountain slopes of California and Nevada, where it is a common plant.

== Description ==
This is a variable perennial which may be a spindly 10 centimeters in height or a bushy 40 centimeters. The rounded or scoop-shaped leaves appear in a mat on the ground, each up to 2 or 3 centimeters wide at maximum, and densely woolly. The stout, woolly inflorescence branches and produces flower clusters at nodes. The flowers are generally red or pale yellow.

== Cultivation ==
Eriogonum saxatile is cultivated as a low-maintenance rock garden plant.
