= Solidus (disambiguation) =

Solidus is a Roman coin of nearly solid gold.

Solidus (Latin for "solid") may also refer to:

- Solidus (punctuation), or slash, a punctuation mark
- Solidus (chemistry), the line on a phase diagram below which a substance is completely solid
- Solidus Snake, a character in Metal Gear Solid 2: Sons of Liberty
