= Granophyre =

Type of subvolcanic rock

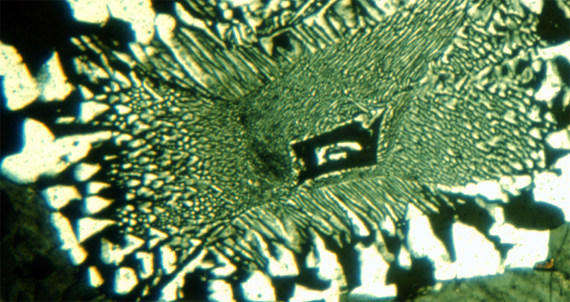
Cross-polarized light microscope image of an intergrowth of quartz and alkali feldspar in a granophyre (Muskox intrusion), as seen in thin section (Long dimension is 1.5 mm)

Granophyre (/ˈɡrænəfaɪər/ GRAN-ə-fire; from granite and porphyry) is a subvolcanic rock that contains quartz and alkali feldspar in characteristic angular intergrowths such as those in the accompanying image.

The texture is called granophyric. The texture can be similar to micrographic texture and to the coarser graphic intergrowths of quartz and alkali feldspar common in pegmatite. These textures document simultaneous crystallization of quartz and feldspar from a silicate melt at the eutectic point, perhaps in the presence of a water-rich phase. They may also be formed by crystallization when the magma is significantly undercooled, not necessarily under eutectic conditions.

Granophyres typically are intrusive rocks that crystallized at shallow depths, and many have compositions similar to those of granites. A common occurrence of granophyre is within layered igneous intrusions dominated by rocks with compositions like that of gabbro. In such occurrences, the granophyre may form as an end product of fractional crystallization of a parent mafic magma, or by melting of rocks into which the mafic magma was emplaced, or by a combination of the two processes.

Granophyre may also form as the uppermost stratigraphic layer resulting from melting of upper-middle crustal rocks by a meteorite impact. For example, the upper layer of the Main Mass of the 1850 Ma Sudbury Structure is composed of fine-medium grained granitic rocks with abundant granophyric textures.

== See also ==
- Micrographic texture
- Rock microstructure – Relationship between materials which compose a rock
- Granite – Type of igneous rock
- Eutectic – Mixture with a lower melting point than its constituents
- Solidus – Melting points of chemical mixtures
