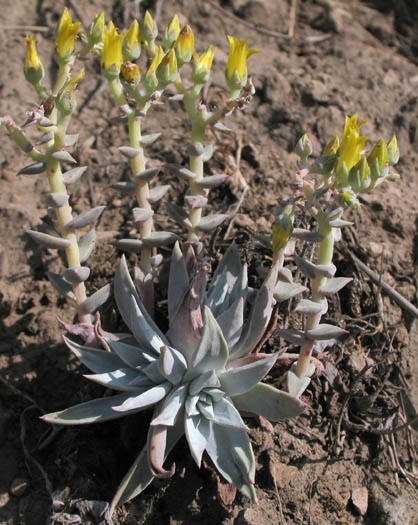
- Dudleya verityi at the Santa Monica Mountains National Recreation Area

Conservation status
- Threatened (ESA)

Scientific classification
- Kingdom: Plantae
- Clade: Tracheophytes
- Clade: Angiosperms
- Clade: Eudicots
- Order: Saxifragales
- Family: Crassulaceae
- Genus: Dudleya
- Species: D. verityi

Binomial name
- Dudleya verityi K.M.Nakai

= Dudleya verityi =

Species of succulent plant from the U.S.

Dudleya verityi is a rare species of succulent plant known by the common name Verity's liveforever. It is endemic to Ventura County, California, where it is known from only three occurrences in the vicinity of Conejo Mountain between Camarillo and Thousand Oaks. It probably occurs in a few additional locations nearby which have not yet been officially vouchered.

== Description ==
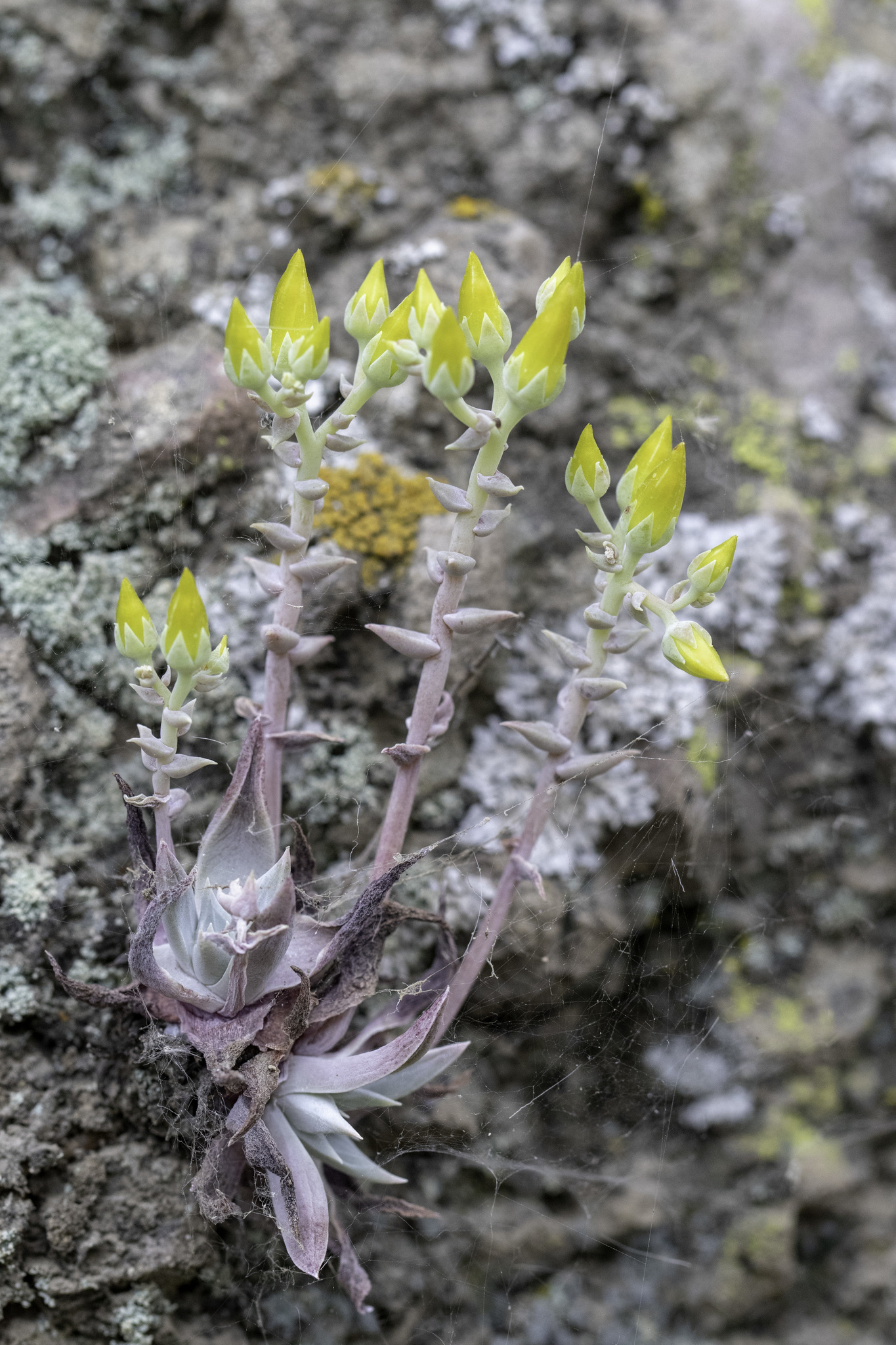
Flowering.

This is a fleshy perennial plant growing from a branching caudex several centimeters long. The leaves appear in a basal rosette about the caudex. The leaves are waxy in texture, pale grayish or pinkish green in color. The erect inflorescence is composed of a bract-lined peduncle up to 15 centimeters tall which splits into terminal branches each bearing several flowers. The flower has a base of fleshy, triangular sepals and longer, bright yellow petals just over a centimeter long.

=== Morphology ===
The caudex is 2 to 10 mm thick, and 2 to 10 cm long, and caespitosely branches to form a relaxed cluster, which may be more tightly compact in cultivation. The cluster is roughly 10 to 40 cm wide, with 25 to 100 or more rosettes. Each rosette is around 2 to 8 cm in diameter, with 6 to 10 leaves. The rosette leaves are glaucous, shaped oblong to lanceolate, and have a leaf apex shaped acute to acuminate. The leaves are roughly 2 to 5 cm long, 4 to 8 mm wide, and 2 to 3 mm thick, with the base of the leaf 5 to 8 mm wide. The upper sides of the leaves are flat to slightly concave, while the lower side is rounded, while the margins of the leaves are acute.

The peduncle is glaucous, and tinged with a purple coloration on the lower third. It is erect, and reaches from 5 to 15 cm tall, 3 to 6 mm thick, with 5 to 15 bracts. The lower 3 cm of the peduncle is usually bare of these bracts. The bracts are ascending, shaped lanceolate with an acute tip, with the lowermost ones 8 to 10 mm long, and 5 to 7 mm wide. The inflorescence first branches 2 to 3 times, often in an obpyramidal shape. These branches in turn may be simple (not re-branching) or they may form bifurcate ascending branches. The terminal branches are circinate (coiled on themselves, like the frond of a fern), and in age are ascending. The terminal branches are 2 to 5 cm long, and have 2 to 10 flowers on them. The pedicels are ascending to erect in flower, and become definitively erect in fruit, with the lowermost 3 to 5 mm long, and 1 to 2 mm thick.

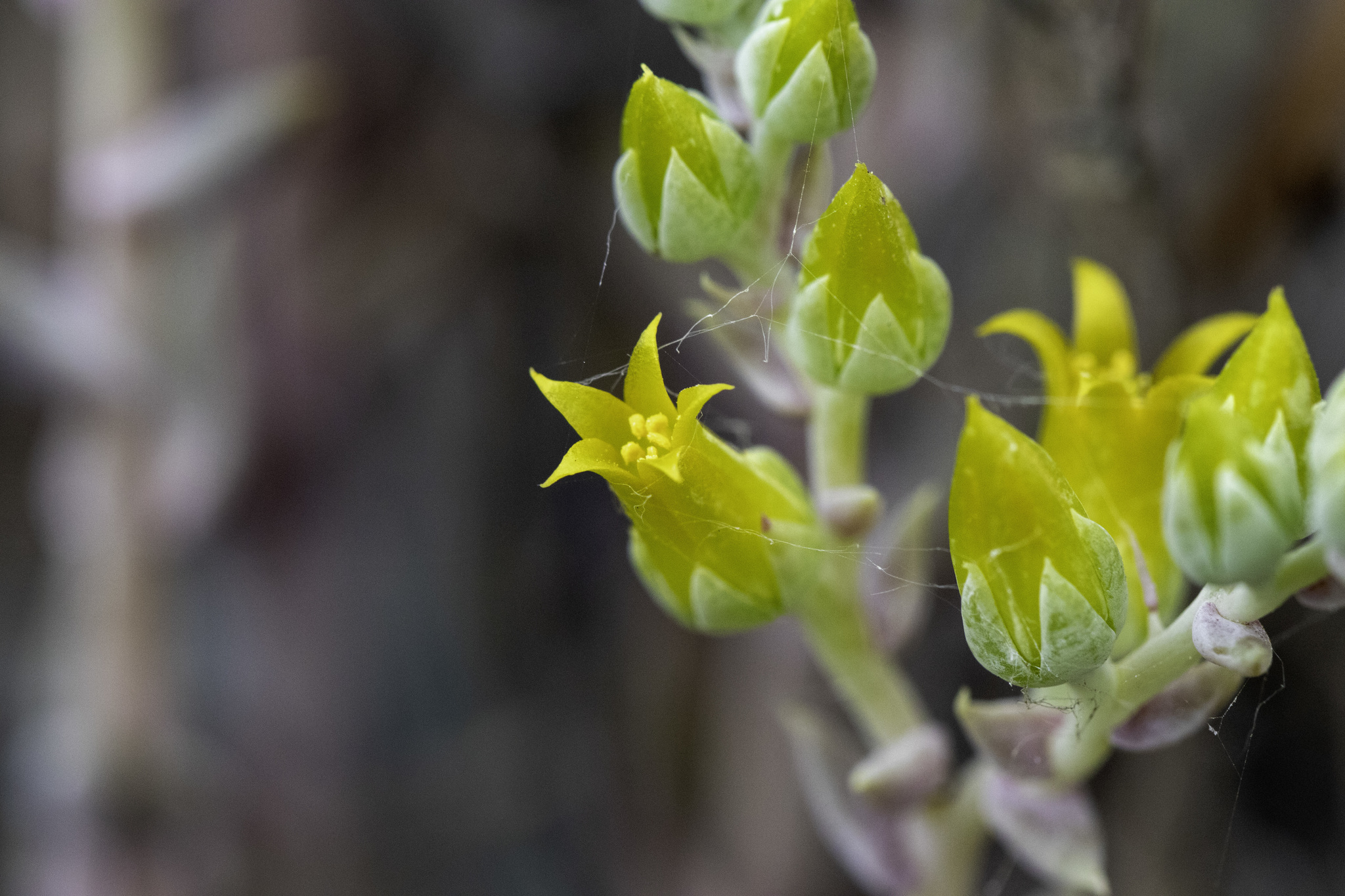
Detail of the flowers.

The calyx is 5 to 7 mm wide, and 4 to 5 mm high. The segments are shaped triangular, 3 to 5 mm long, 2 to 2.5 mm wide, with an acute tip. The corolla is shaped nearly conical in bud, colored yellow with a tinge of green on the midrib, and in anthesis is tubular, being slightly constricted at the mouth. The tube is 8 to 10 mm long, and 4 to 5 mm wide at the base, with the tips of the petals recurving to 90 degrees or more from vertical. The color of the petals is described as a lemon yellow, shaped oblong to lanceolate, with an acute tip, 10 to 14 mm long, and 2.5 to 4 mm wide in the middle, connate (fused to form a tube) 1 to 2 mm.

Flowering is from May to June. Chromosome number is n = 17, making this plant a diploid.

== Taxonomy ==
=== Taxonomic history ===
This plant was first collected by botanist and Dudleya researcher Reid Moran in 1944. Moran and cytologist Charles H. Uhl later placed this plant as a population of Dudleya caespitosa in 1953. This was likely due to the fact that it had similar morphological characteristics, such as yellow petals, a glaucous rosette, and relatively thick, oblong-lanceolate leaves, which appear close to the population of D. caespitosa at Point Mugu. However, D. caespitosa is a polyploid species, and it is rarely diploid like Dudleya verityi.

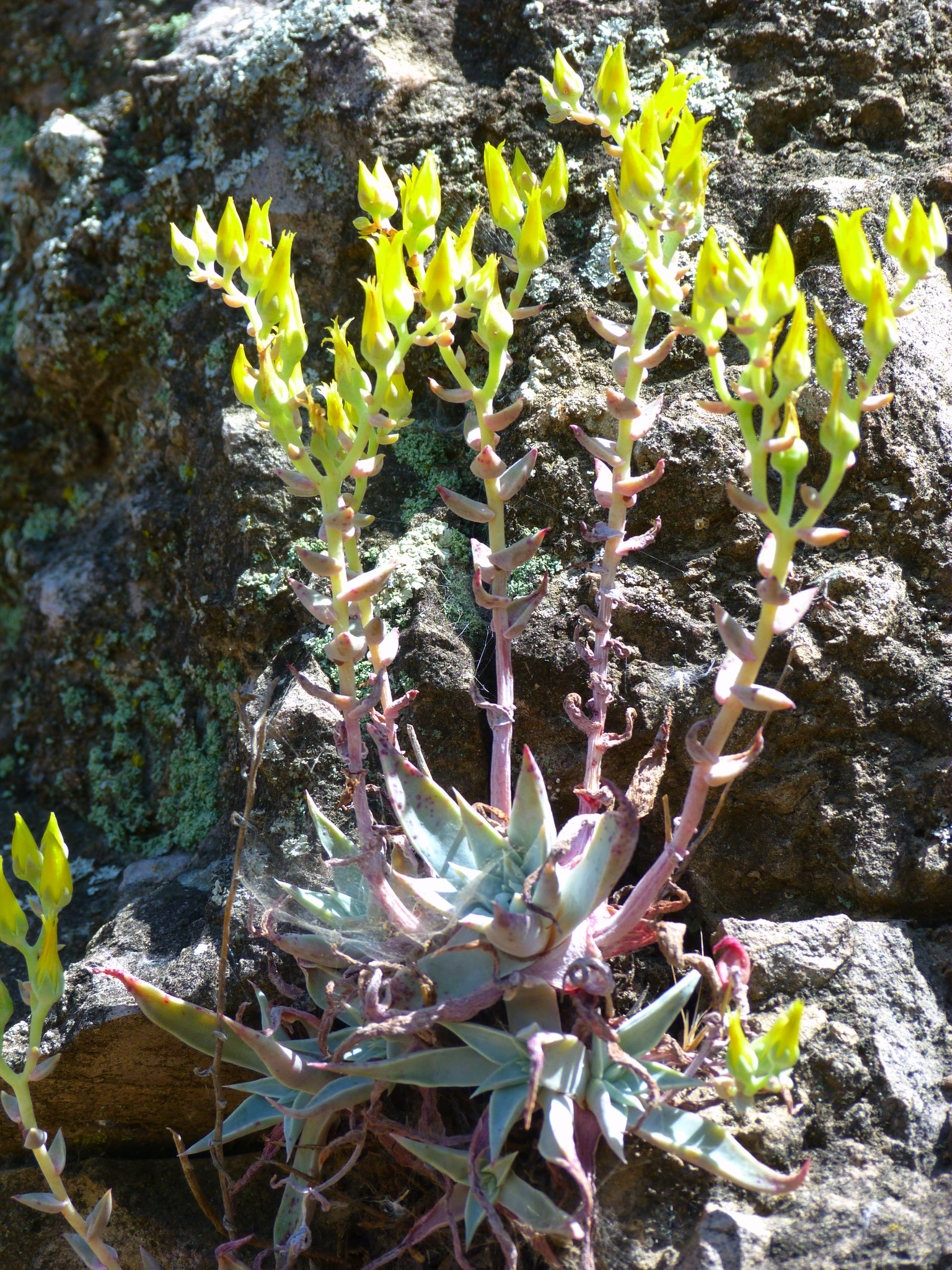
A caespitose clump.

Peter H. Raven and Henry J. Thompson in their 1966 "Flora of the Santa Monica Mountains" placed this population as Dudleya farinosa, which is closely related to D. caespitosa. Their primary motive to place it as D. farinosa was probably because of the paler yellow flowers, caespitose habit and diploid chromosome number, which they believed fit better into the circumscription of D. farinosa instead of D. caespitosa.

Despite these placements, this species has numerous unique characteristics that separate it from both D. caespitosa and D. farinosa. The petal shape, along with the recurving petal tips and diploid chromosome count, are within the range of diagnostic distinctions used to separate species in this genus.

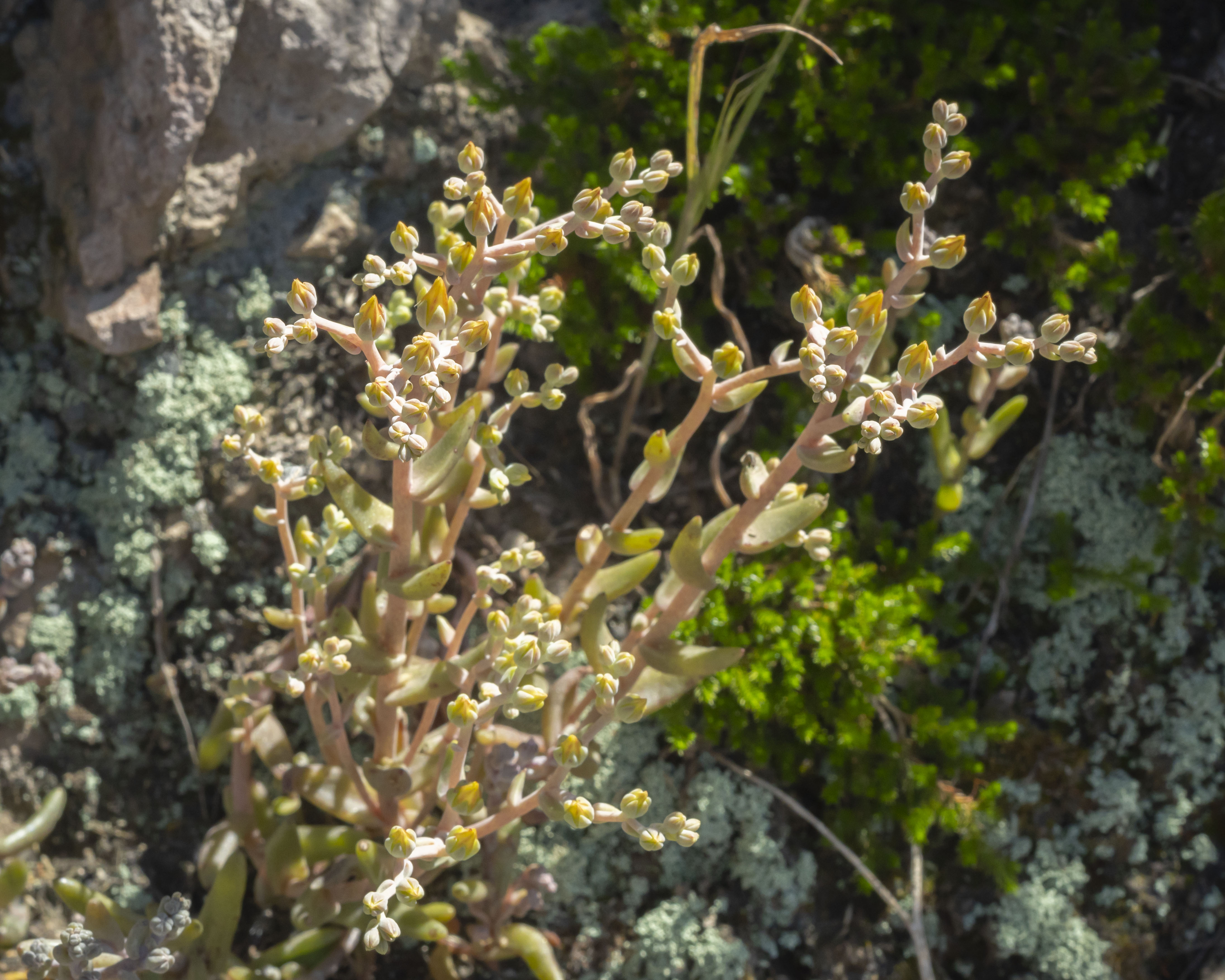
A natural hybrid of Dudleya blochmaniae and Dudleya verityi.

Botanist Kei M. Nakai later segregated the population by describing it as a species in its own right. He also noted the similarity of the flower morphology to nearby Dudleya cymosa, particularly of the subspecies ovatifolia. He hypothesized that D. verityi could have potentially emerged from a past hybridization event between ancestral D. cymosa and D. caespitosa populations, as this species has the floral characteristics of D. cymosa but the vegetative morphology of D. caespitosa. Nakai also noted the existence of hybrids between Dudleya blochmaniae and this species.

=== Etymology ===
This species is named after David S. Verity, a horticulturist and entomologist who did work on Dudleya hybrids. David Verity hybridized many inter-subgeneric hybrids, even ones with varying levels of ploidy.

== Ecology ==
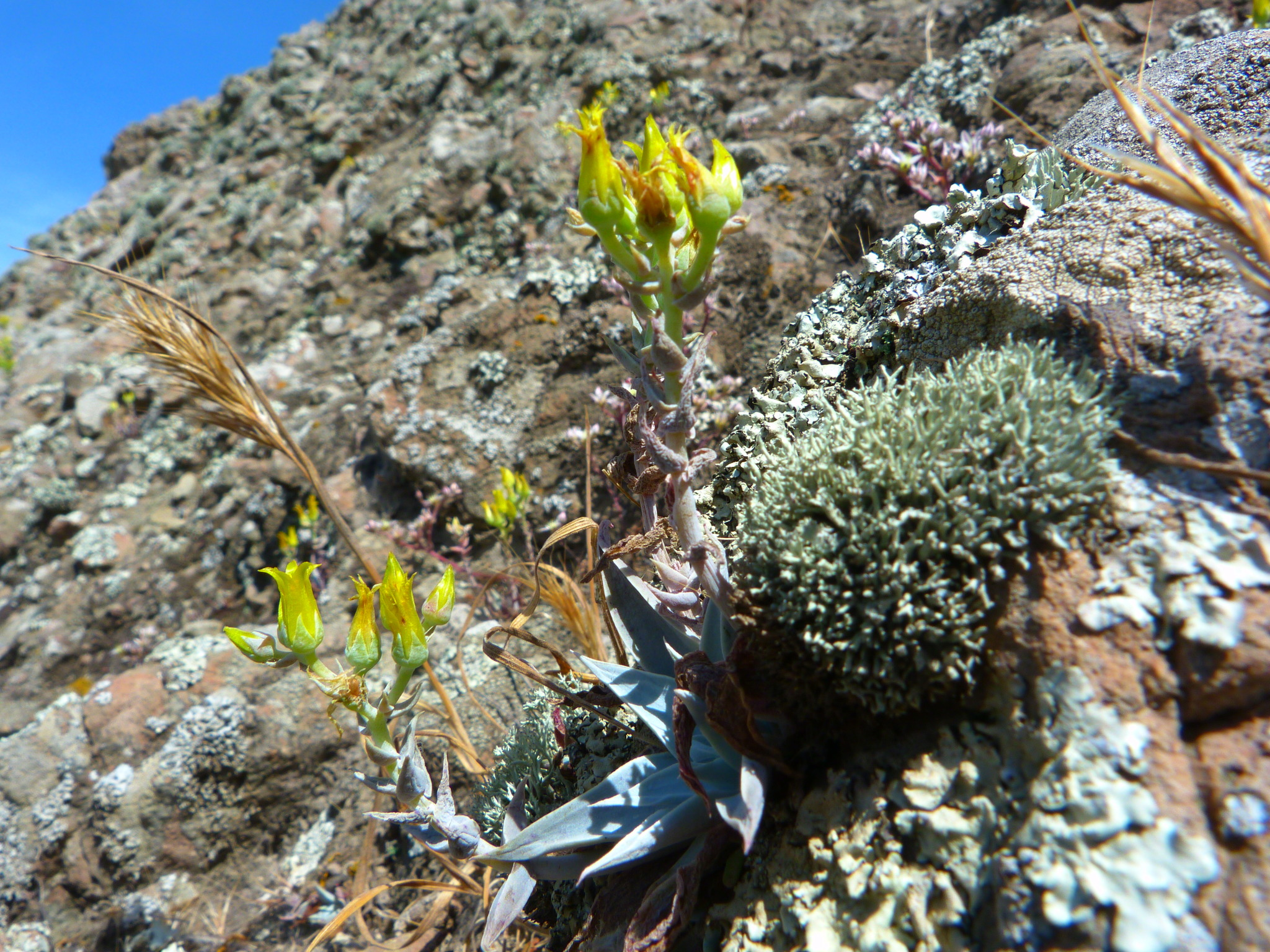
Growing with lichen.

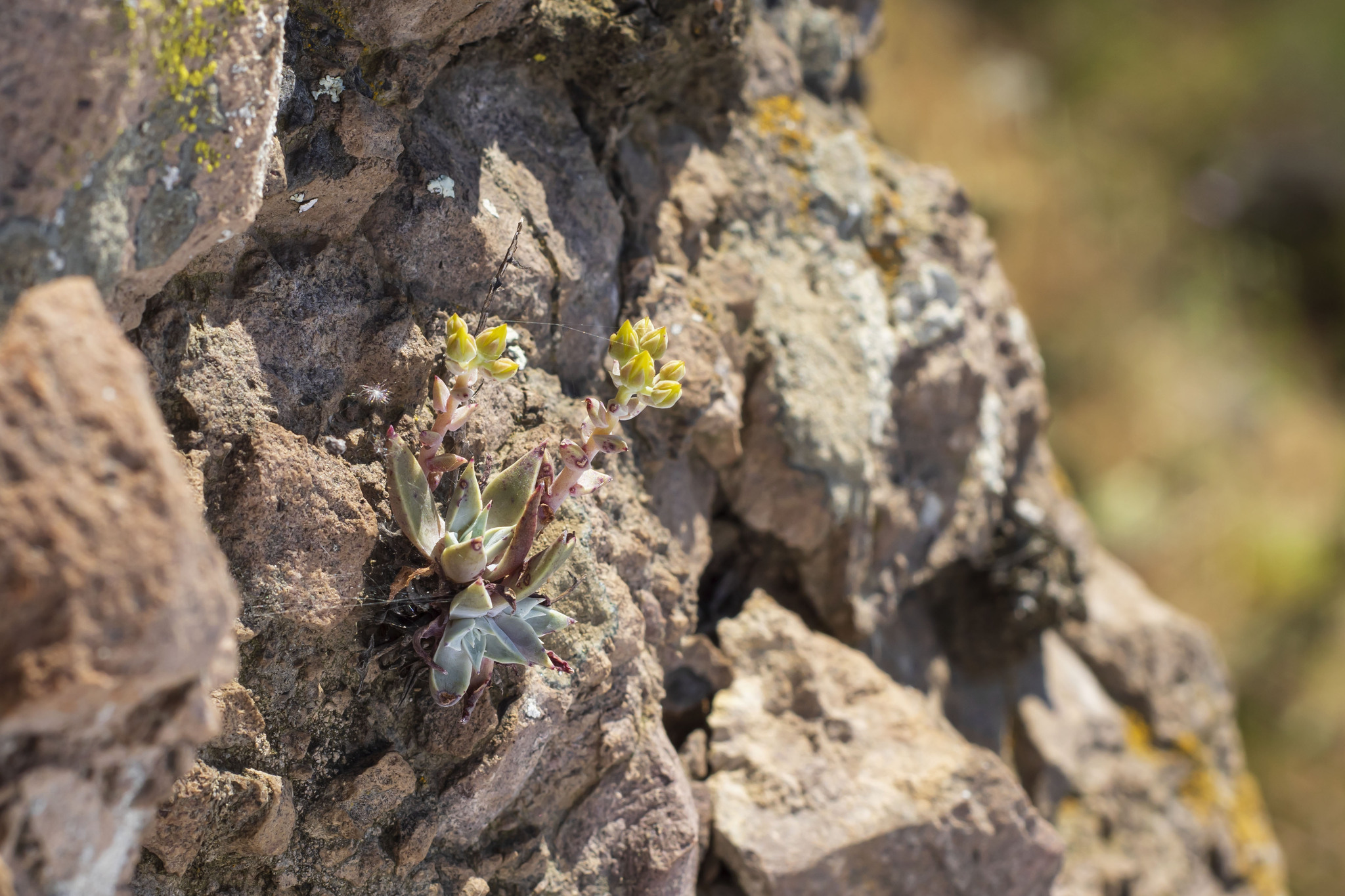
With budding flowers on Conejo Mountain.

This dudleya associates with mosses and lichens. It often grows in layers of the lichen Niebla ceruchoides, which may provide a moisture-capturing bed for seeds that fall from it. This dudleya hybridizes with other species, such as Dudleya blochmaniae.

This species is only found on one edge of the Santa Monica Mountains, where it occurs in coastal sage scrub habitat. The dominant plants are California sagebrush (Artemisia californica), California buckwheat (Eriogonum fasciculatum) and purple sage (Salvia leucophylla). At least two occurrences are within the campus bounds of California State University, Channel Islands.

== Conservation ==
It is a federally listed threatened species, with the main threat to its existence being destruction of its habitat for development, mining, and flood control. The Springs Fire in 2013 nearly wiped it out and the years-long drought that continued afterwards has made for a very tough recovery. Evidence of poaching was discovered in 2019.
