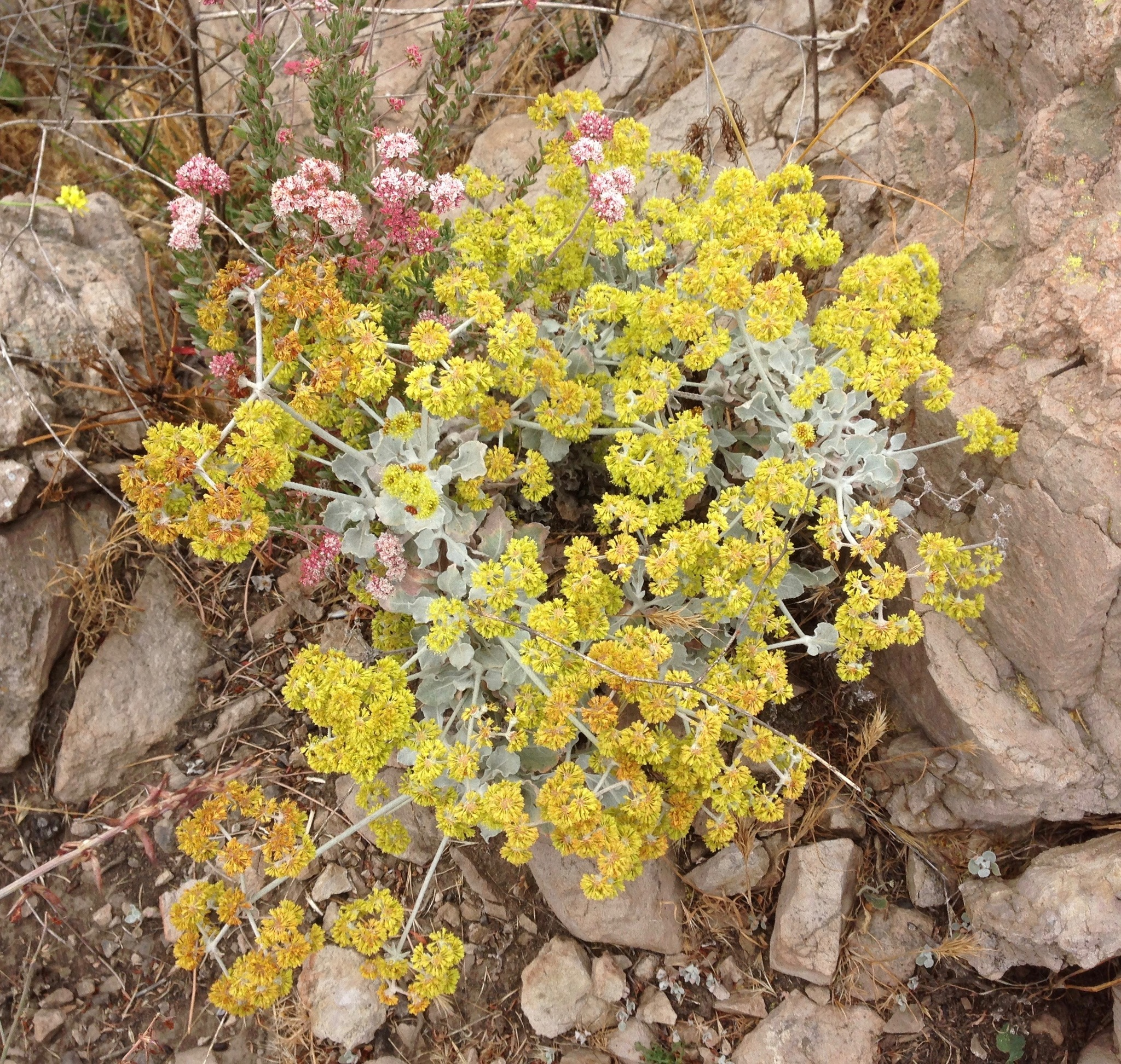

Conservation status
- Critically Imperiled (NatureServe)

Scientific classification
- Kingdom: Plantae
- Clade: Tracheophytes
- Clade: Angiosperms
- Clade: Eudicots
- Order: Caryophyllales
- Family: Polygonaceae
- Genus: Eriogonum
- Species: E. crocatum

Binomial name
- Eriogonum crocatum Davidson

Synonyms
- Eriogonum saxatile var. crocatum

= Eriogonum crocatum =

Species of wild buckwheat

Eriogonum crocatum, the Conejo buckwheat or saffron buckwheat, is a species of Eriogonum, or wild buckwheat. It is endemic to the Conejo Valley and surrounding regions in Ventura County, California. It grows on open, dry hillsides, often in crags in rock faces.

== Description ==
Eriogonum crocatum is a perennial shrub less than 0.5 metres (1.6 ft) high by 0.5–1 metre (1.6–3.3 ft) wide. Its foliage is a striking silvery green, with woolly leaves.

The Conejo buckwheat flowers from April–August, bearing clusters of tiny bright, sulfur yellow flowers. It has no dormancy period.

== Taxonomy ==
Eriogonum crocatum was scientifically described and named by Anstruther Davidson in 1924. It is part of the Eriogonum genus in the Polygonaceae family and has no accepted varieties, but was once described as a variety of Eriogonum saxatile in 1935 by Philip Alexander Munz.

== Cultivation ==
Eriogonum crocatum has entered limited cultivation in native plant gardens and xeriscaping. It likes sun and is drought tolerant. It rarely exceeds 0.5 m in height and 1 m in width, so it makes an excellent accent plant. It thrives in clay soils and survives some other soils. It is reportedly difficult to cultivate outside of the southern California area. It can tolerate light freezes.
