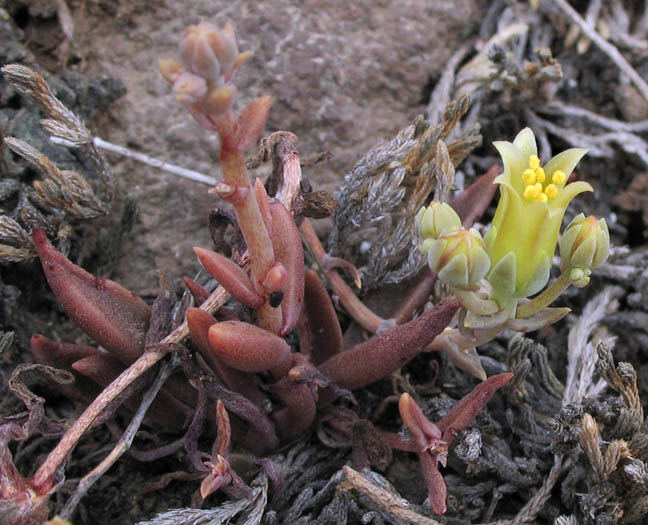

Conservation status
- Critically Imperiled (NatureServe)

Scientific classification
- Kingdom: Plantae
- Clade: Embryophytes
- Clade: Tracheophytes
- Clade: Spermatophytes
- Clade: Angiosperms
- Clade: Eudicots
- Order: Saxifragales
- Family: Crassulaceae
- Genus: Dudleya
- Species: D. parva

Binomial name
- Dudleya parva Rose & Davidson

Synonyms
- Dudleya abramsii subsp. parva (Rose & Davidson) Bartel

= Dudleya parva =

Subspecies of succulent

Dudleya parva, known by the common name Conejo dudleya, is a species of deciduous succulent plant native to the Conejo Valley and surrounding regions. It blooms from May to June, and has vernal leaves. It is only found from the western end of Simi Hills along the Montclef Ridge to the Conejo Grade in Newbury Park.

== Description ==
=== Characteristics ===
This species of Dudleya is an especially unique taxa, as it possesses several characteristics intermediate within the genus. It was previously thought Dudleya were organized into three subgenera; Dudleya, Stylophyllum, and Hasseanthus. It was thought that Dudleya and Hasseanthus were the most distant from each other, and that Stylophyllum occupied an intermediate space. Dudleya were thought to have evergreen leaves and habit, while Hasseanthus were classified with a deciduous, geophytic habit. Dudleya parva, however, was originally classified in the subgenera Dudleya, but it presents several traits of Hasseanthus. It has summer deciduous leaves, and a rhizomatous habit. It is also unusual among Dudleya in that it may be rooted from the leaves, which has only been recorded among other Hasseanthus-type Dudleya.

=== Morphology ===
Arising from stems may be multiple rosettes, at most several, each 1 to 6 cm wide. The roots are narrowed and swollen at irregular intervals, with rhizome-like branches extending from the roots of the plant. The rhizomes often resemble shriveled roots for most of the year, and are very fragile. The rhizomes are not a good character for field identification. Because the plant is rhizomatous, the above-ground parts of the plant may die back for several years, surviving underground as a rootstock. It is a long-lived species, with some examples surviving over 24 years in cultivation.

The stems are 2 to 7 mm wide. The leaves are deciduous in summer, and are 1.5 to 4 cm long, 3 to 6 mm wide, and shaped oblanceolate, glaucous in youth, but papery when dry. The base of the leaves is a wounding purple to red. The peduncle of the inflorescence is 4 to 23 cm tall, and 1 to 5 mm wide. The lower bracts are 5 to 15 mm, and the inflorescence branches once or twice. The petals are yellow, and the keel is often flecked with red.

The 2n chromosome number is 34.

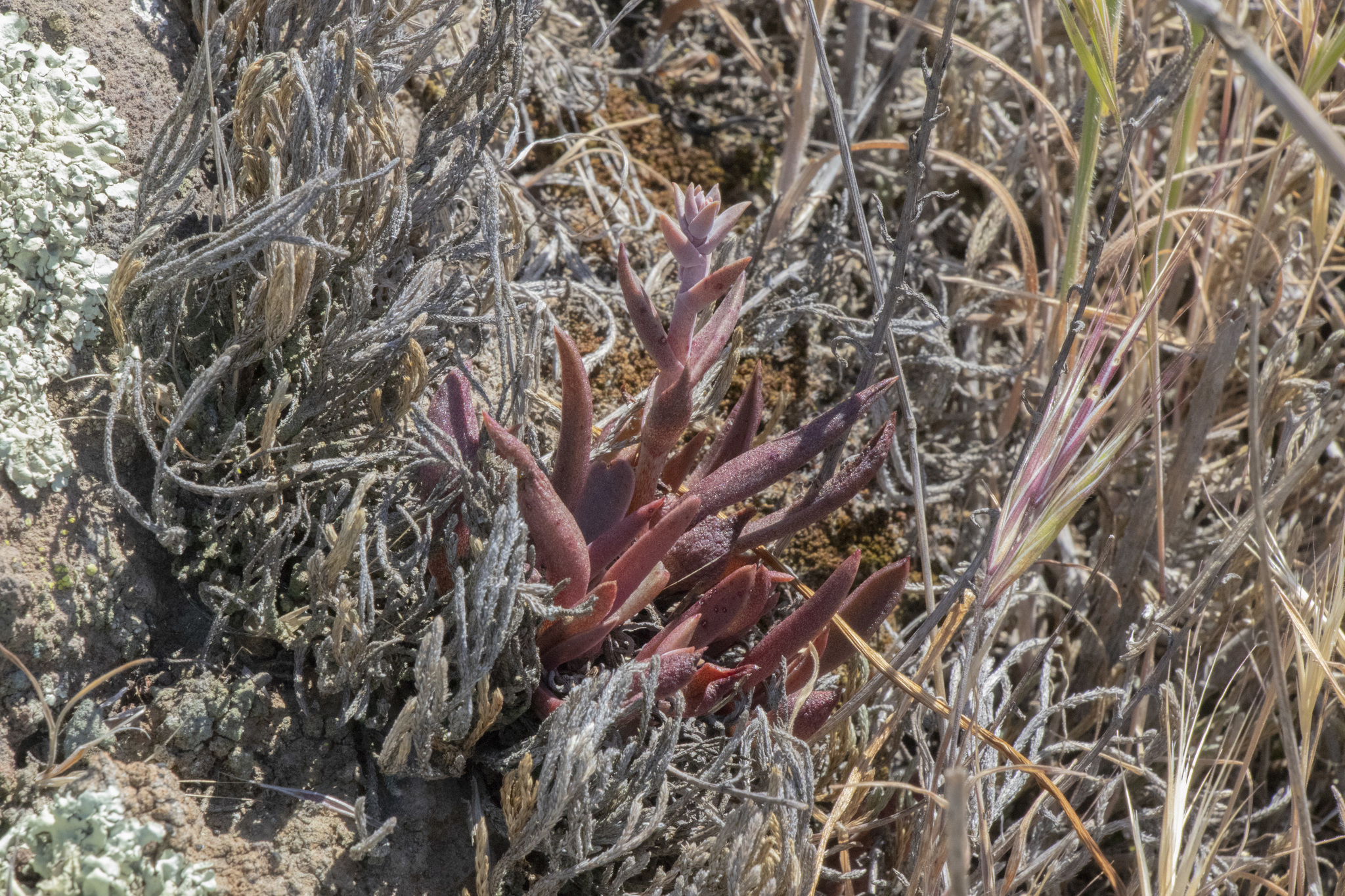
A budding specimen

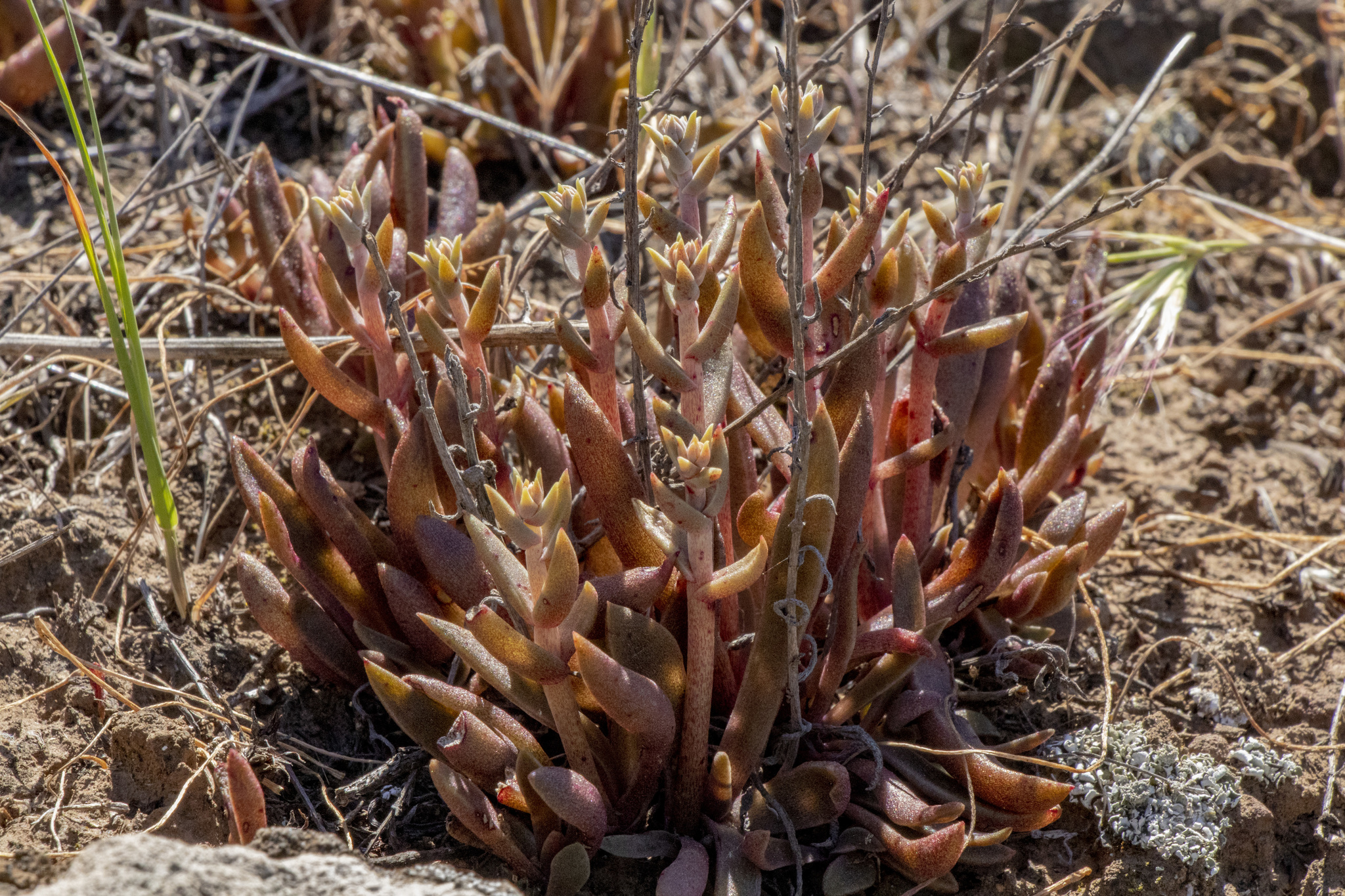
Budding flower stalks arising from the base

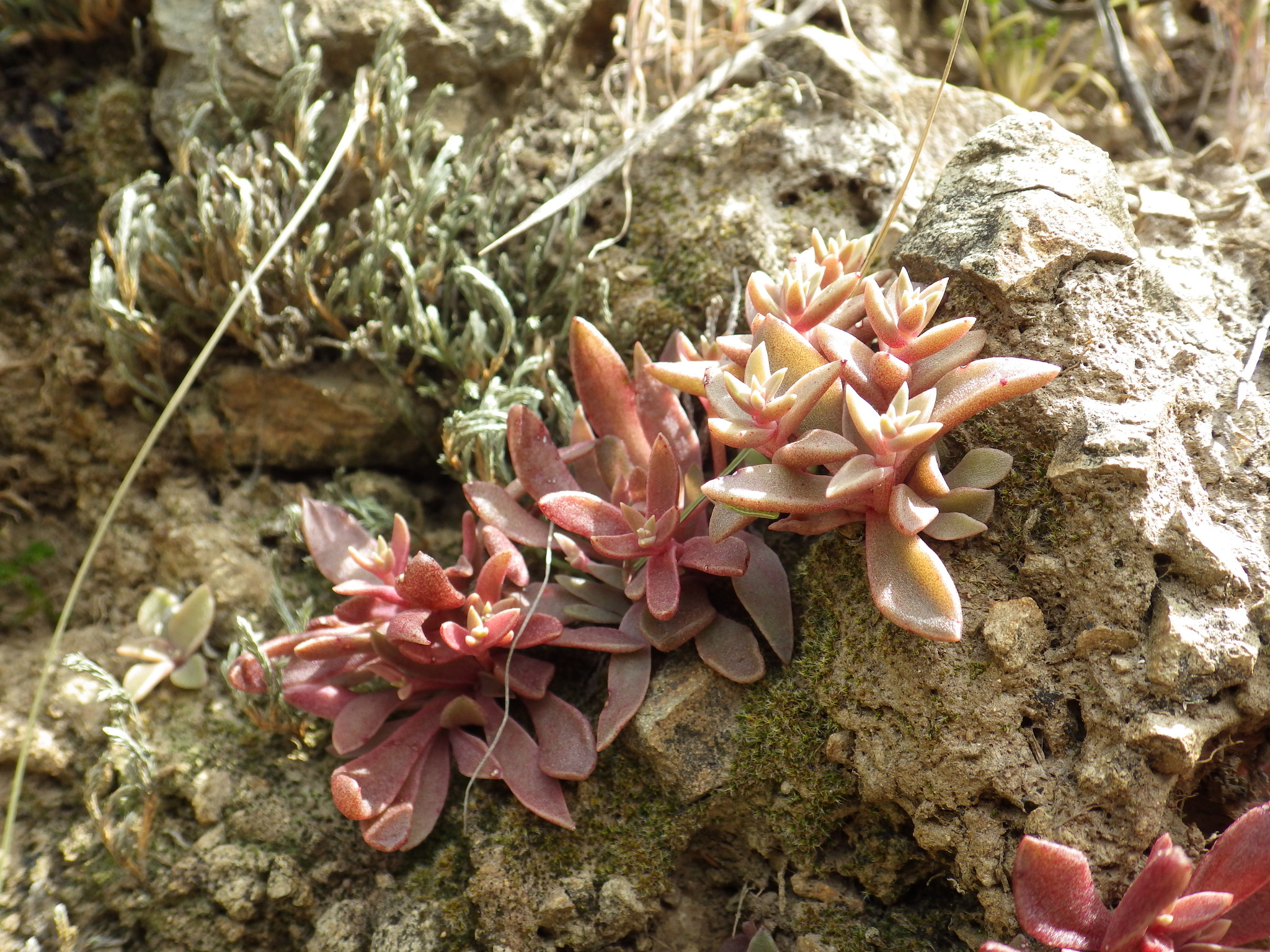
The basal rosettes

== Distribution and habitat ==
The entire species is located over a 16 km stretch of land on an east–west ridgeline of Conejo volcanics, on the western end of the Simi Hills, along Mountclef Ridge, and terminating near Conejo Grade. This distribution only covers an area of around several hundred acres. The population boundaries exhibits some annual fluctuations, but otherwise it has remained in the same suitable habitat area for some time. The rugged terrain makes tracking populations difficult, along with the summer deciduous habit.

It is typically found on north-facing cliffs of the Conejo volcanics, and on the adjacent grassland.

== Conservation ==
This species is threatened by land development and recreational activity. A significant portion of the land that this species occurs on is designated as "open space" by the Conejo Open Space Conservation Agency, or on parklands managed by Ventura County. The remaining habitat is either owned by local governments, or is privately owned land. An increase in the number of hikers, tramplers and invasive species has damaged the population. Many of the sites occurring on private land cannot be adequately surveyed.

== See also ==
- Dudleya abramsii
