= Newbury Park Post Office =

Post office in the Conejo Valley, California

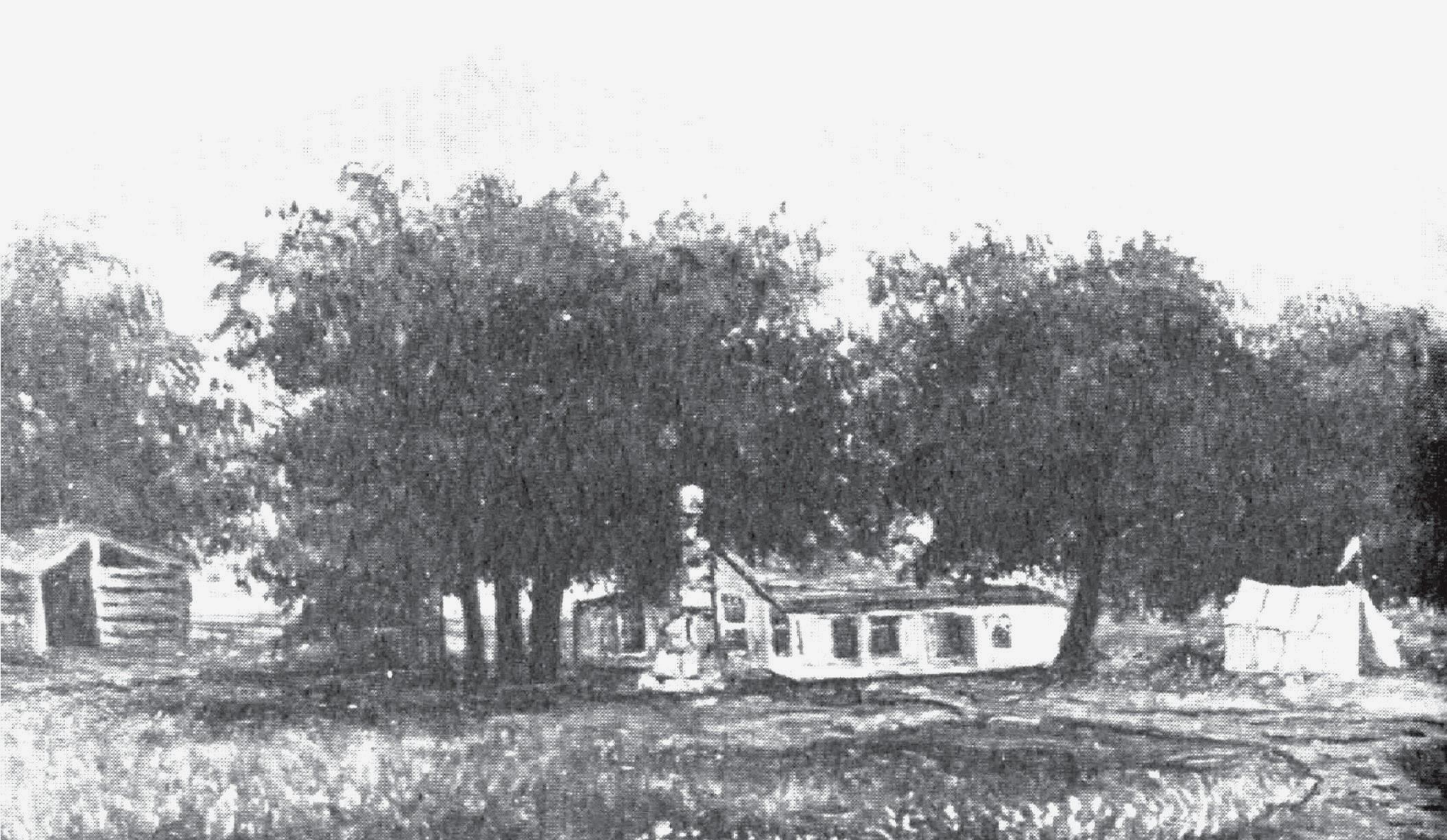
E.S. Newbury's home, 1870s. Conejo Valley's first post office was located in the tent.

The Newbury Park Post Office was the first post office in the Conejo Valley, established on July 16, 1875, by the valley's first postmaster, Egbert Starr Newbury.

The post office was originally located in a tent on Newbury's property, today's site of Thousand Oaks Civic Arts Plaza. Egbert Starr Newbury and his wife Frances put the tent few feet from their home, providing local ranchers and their families with a site to pick up and drop off mail. Prior to the establishment of the post office, Conejo Valley residents had to ride a horse to Ventura to reach the nearest post office.

The post office has had a variety of locations in the valley. It was first located at the current site of the Thousand Oaks Civic Arts Plaza, and was relocated numerous times before ending up at the present site of The Oaks mall in 1891. William Knowlton moved it to the original site of the Stagecoach Inn on Ventu Park Road in 1908, but it was moved to a 10-by-12-foot building at 1200 Newbury Road in 1942. It was moved to 1602 Newbury Road in 1968, and relocated to 3401 Grande Vista Drive in 2013. Although the post office changed locations multiple times, its name remained the same, which is why the Newbury Park city address is still used today.

== History ==
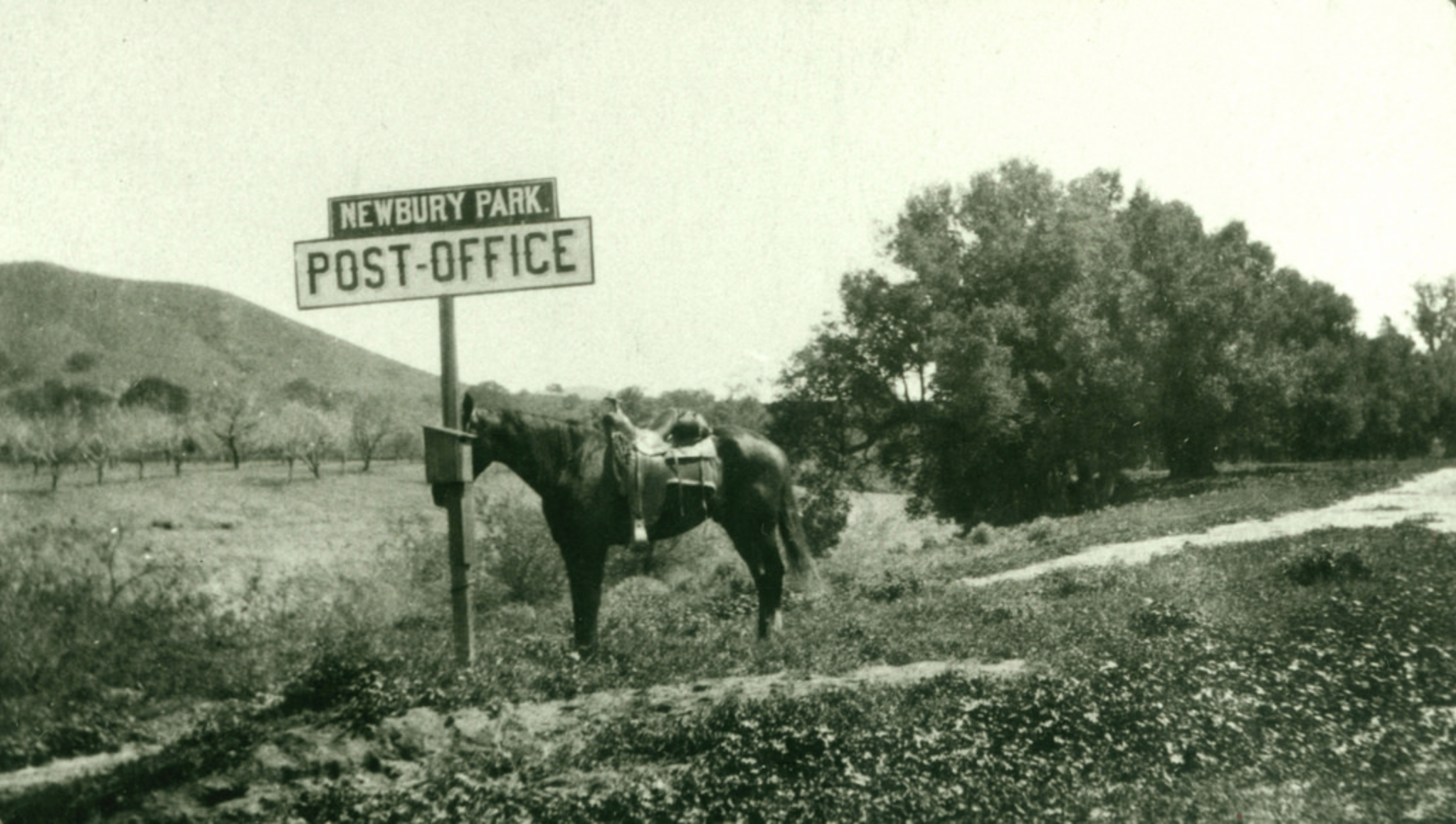
A mailbox in 1909.

Egbert Starr Newbury moved with his wife and child from Santa Barbara to the Conejo Valley in 1874, where he built his home at the present day site of the Thousand Oaks Civic Arts Plaza. As there was no official place to send or receive mail, Newbury decided to apply to the federal government for a post office. On July 16, 1875, the post office opened in a tent outside Newbury's home, and Newbury became the first postmaster in the Conejo Valley. When the stage company, Coast Line Stage Company, abandoned their route through Conejo Valley in 1876, mail was only a few times per week by various people on government contract. Following the devastating drought of 1876-77, the Newbury family left the Conejo Valley, and the location of the post office changed many times. For ten years it was located in the eastern end of the Conejo Valley, in the homes of various ranchers, however still called the Newbury Park Post Office. The Timberville Post Office was established in today's Newbury Park in 1888, in order to serve the small community of Timberville, centered around the Grand Union Hotel and the Timber School.

As there were two post offices in the Conejo Valley in 1891, postmasters James Skelton of the east end and G. W. Hepner of the west end, petitioned to have both offices consolidated with a proposed location halfway between the two. An agreement was reached on June 21, 1893, and the chosen location for the combined post offices was on Richard Orville Hunt's Salto Ranch, near the present-day Lynn Road and Hillcrest Drive. The name "Newbury Park Post Office" was retained, and Mr. Hunt was the postmaster with his wife Mary Jane as his assistant. After 17 years on the Hunt Ranch near present-day The Oaks mall, it was moved in 1908 to a shop owned by William Knowlton located near Conejo Hotel on Newbury Road. It was operated by William and his sister Sarah until 1924, when it moved into a tiny 10-by-12 foot structure at 1200 Newbury Road, with one electric light and no running water.

For 29 years the post office remained at the same Newbury Road location, until 1953 when it was moved farther north up Newbury Road into larger quarters. A new post office building was erected at 1602 Newbury Road, where the office was dedicated on May 26, 1968. The post office moved from Stagecoach Plaza on Newbury Road to a U.S. Postal Service-owned annex in a business park at 3401 Grande Vista Drive on June 22, 2013.

== Postmasters ==
List of Newbury Park postmasters:

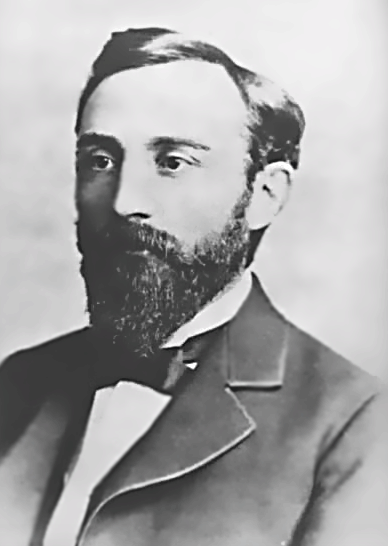
E.S. Newbury, founder of Newbury Park and first postmaster in the Conejo Valley.

- July 16, 1875: Egbert Starr Newbury
- August 21, 1877: James Bellah
- December 19, 1878: Howard Mills
- January 26, 1882: Jonathan Cutler
- October 8, 1883: Ignatius Philbrook
- 1885: James Skelton
- November 25, 1891: Richard O. Hunt (land owner of Salto/Lynn Ranch)
- February 1, 1908: Wil Knowlton (uncle of Reba Hays Jeffries)
- September 15, 1909: Sarah Knowlton
- February 17, 1916: Sarah E. Patton
- 1920: Wil Knowlton
- February 16, 1921: Louise R. Browning
- February 25, 1924: Lloyd V. Lewis
- April 22, 1931: Christine E. Lewis
- October 4, 1939: Willetta Brossard
- May 27, 1940: Abram Hampton
- October 24, 1942: Florence Hampton
- December 31, 1958: Bertha Jones
- September 4, 1962: Russell E. Jacobsen

On January 8, 1972, the Newbury Park Post Office and the Thousand Oaks Post Office merged, and Russell E. Jacobsen was appointed postmaster for the two offices. Since then to the present, there have been nine postmasters in charge of the combined offices.
