= Walnut Grove Park =

Community park in Newbury Park, California

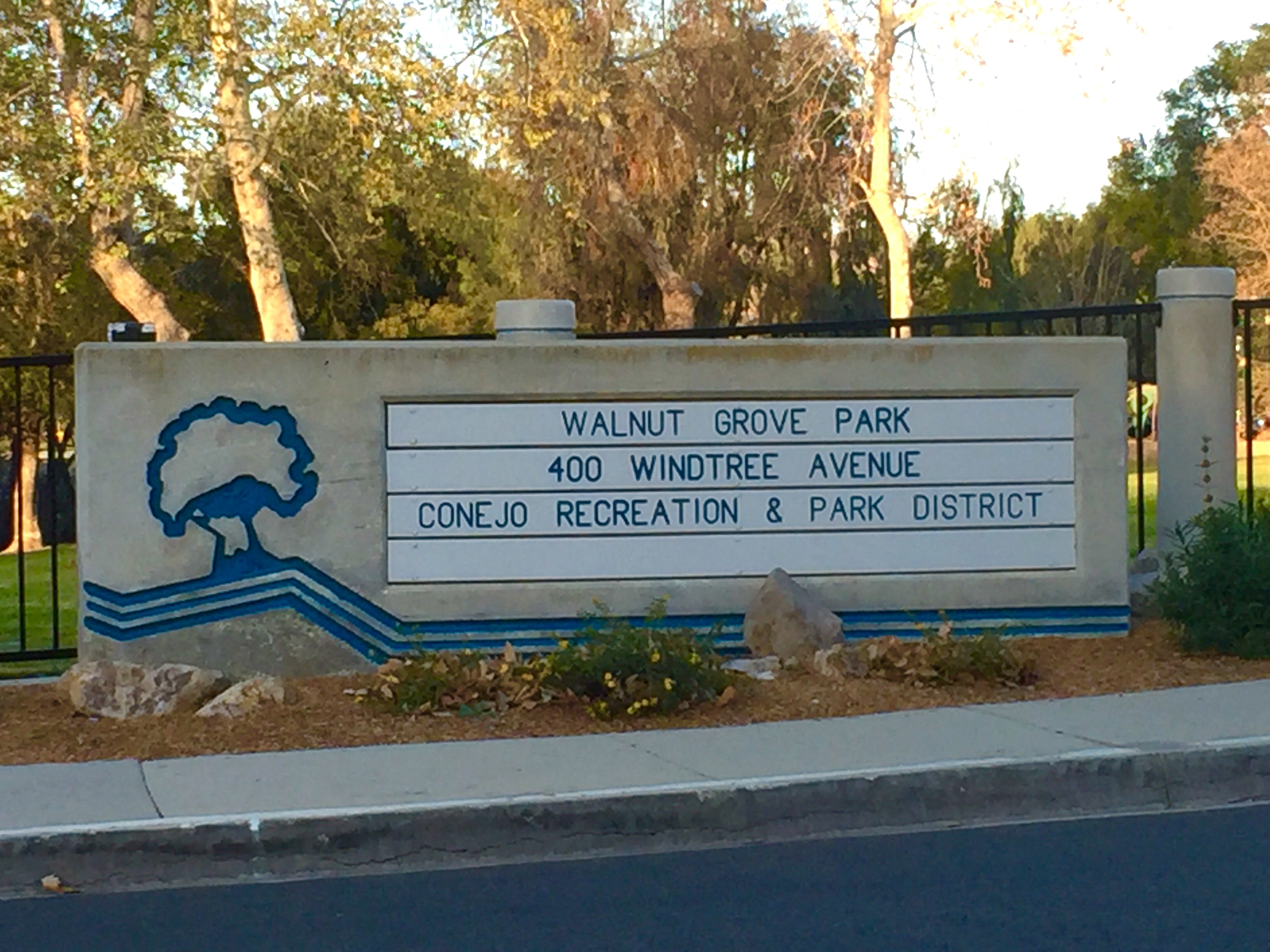
- Sign by entrance
- Interactive map of Walnut Grove Park
- Type: Community park
- Location: 400 Windtree Avenue; Newbury Park, CA 91360
- Coordinates: 34°11′02.3″N 118°53′53.1″W
- Area: 6.5 acres (2.6 ha)
- Created: 1994
- Operator: Conejo Recreation & Park District (CRPD)
- Status: Open daily 7:00am to 10:00pm

Walnut Grove Park is a 6.5 acre community park in Newbury Park, California, United States, situated immediately south of the U.S. 101 Ventura Freeway on Newbury Road. Named for its many walnut trees, the park land was acquired in 1981 and ultimately developed into a community park in 1994. It contains a playground, an outdoor handball court, three BBQ grills, basketball courts, numerous picnic tables, trails, and open-space. It is operated by the Conejo Recreation & Park District (CRPD), and it is adjacent to the Walnut Grove Equestrian Center and its 14 acres of trails, horse arenas, stalls, picnic tables, and various trails for hikers and equestrians. The park is relatively close to the Arroyo Conejo Open Space and its many trails leading for instance to Wildwood Regional Park, which is accessible from its closest trailhead between 507 Kalinda Pl. and 504 Paseo Grande on West Hillcrest Drive. Walnut Grove Park is located along a smaller offspring from the Arroyo Conejo, and is one of only three off-leash dog parks in the Conejo Valley.

Walnut Open Space is a 9-acre adjacent open-space area, which is located near the intersection of Lynn Road and the 101 Ventura Freeway. It is owned by Conejo Open Space Conservation Agency (COSCA). Greenmeadow Trail is a path leading from Walnut Grove Park and through the open-space on its way to Lynn Road.
