= Timber School =

Timber School House
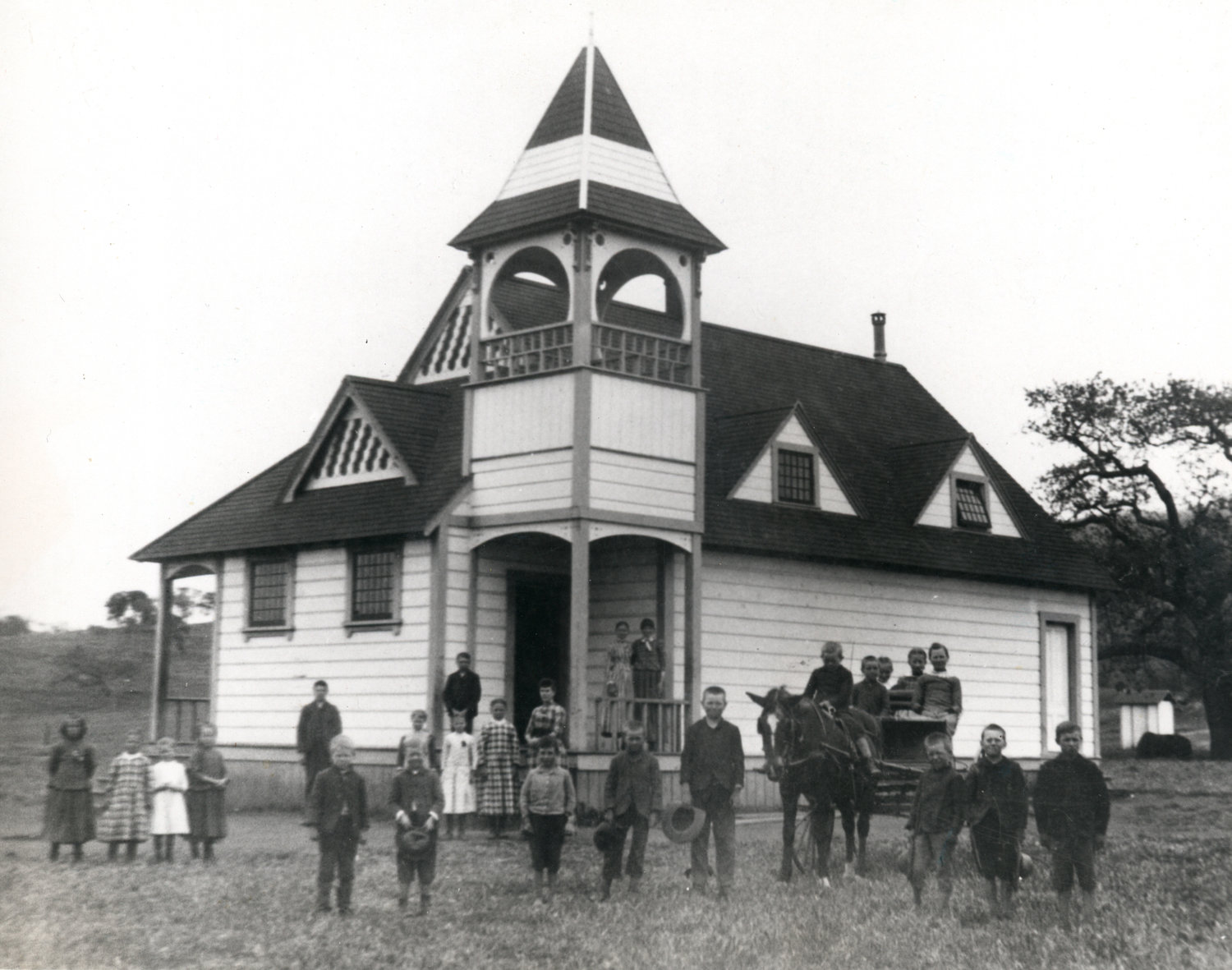
- The original Timber School in the 1890s
- Interactive map of the Timber School House area

General information
- Architectural style: Mission Revival (current schoolhouse)
- Location: 1872 Newbury Road, Newbury Park, CA
- Coordinates: 34°11′1.5″N 118°55′14″W
- Completed: 1889 and 1924
- Owner: Daylight Thousand Oaks LLC

Design and construction
- Architect: Roy C. Wilson

Timber School was the first school in Newbury Park, California when established in 1889. and the current 1924 reconstructed Timber School is the oldest remaining school in the City of Thousand Oaks. It is also the oldest remaining public building in the Conejo Valley.

The original Timber School was demolished in 1925, but the current building had already been erected a year before, immediately in front of the old schoolhouse. The current Timber School House was designed in Mission Revival architectural style by Roy C. Wilson, Ventura County's first licensed architect. It is the former site of Conejo Valley High School which moved following the site's 2015 sale to Daylight Thousand Oaks, LLC, a developer, for $8.9 million. It is located at the southeast corner of Kelley- and Newbury Roads. It is City of Thousand Oaks Landmark No. 12, along with the nearby 1948 Auditorium, and Ventura County Historical Landmark No. 166.

The original 19th-century bell tower can still be seen at its original site, while the bell itself is placed on a monument stand at Cypress Elementary School. An authentic replica of the 1888 schoolhouse is located next to the Stagecoach Inn, along with a replica of the 13-inch high bell.

Notable former students include Reba Hays Jeffries, H. Allen Hays, Adolph Friedrich Jr., Ed Borchard Jr., Donald Haigh, Casper Borchard Jr., Simon Hays, Fred Kelley, Oscar Olsen, and Florence Hampton.

== History ==
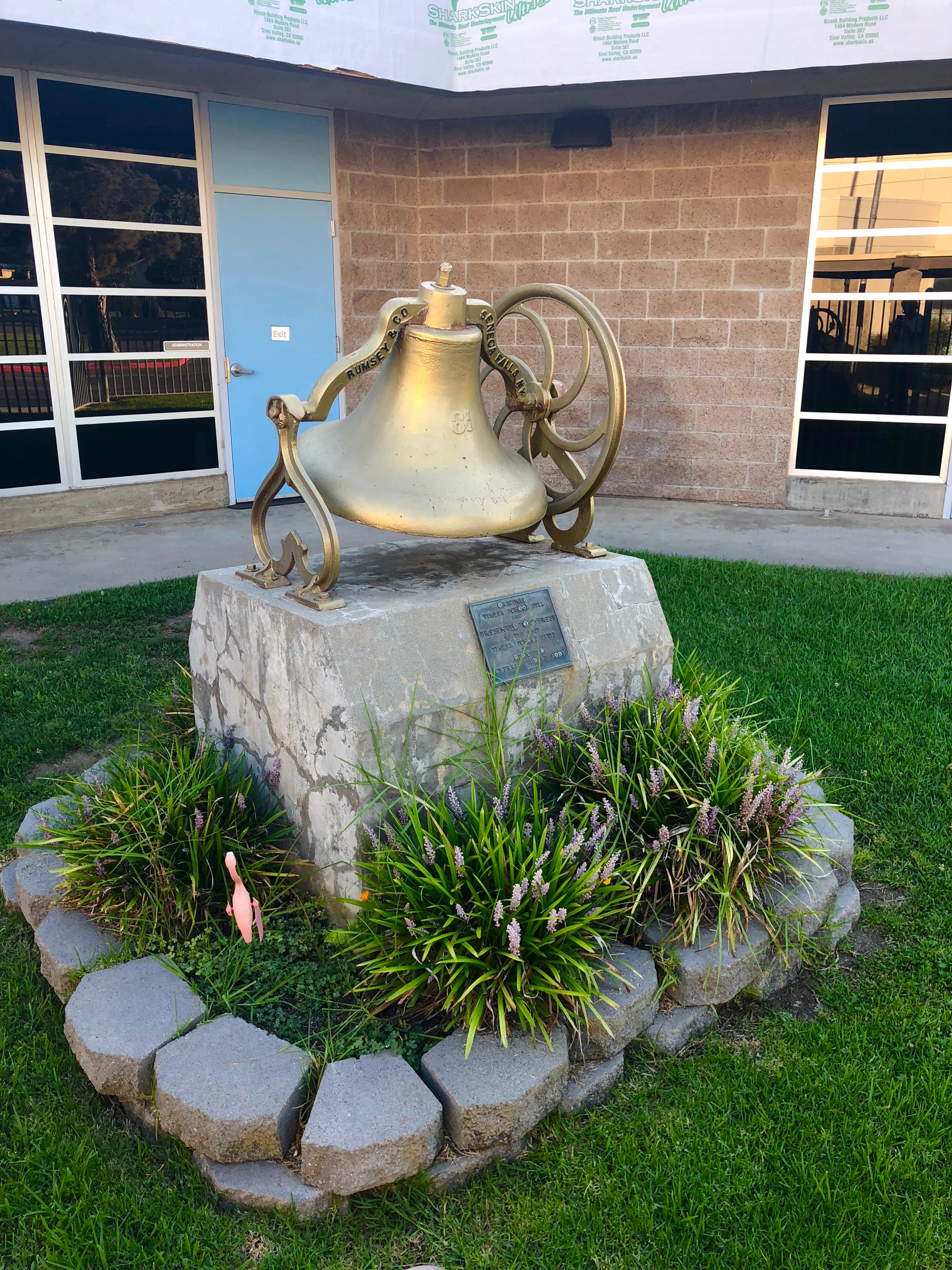
The 1888 bell is housed at Cypress Elementary School.

Until its establishment in 1889, students of Timberville (now Newbury Park, California) attended classes at the Grand Union Hotel, located a few hundred yards east from the schoolhouse. The school drew its student body mainly from Newbury Park farms, and children reached the school on foot, horseback, or by wagon. It was originally constructed on land that belonged to Cecil Arthur Entwisle Haigh, the owner of the Grand Union Hotel. In December 1888, Haigh sold two acres of his land for a new school, at the present day corner of Kelley and Newbury Roads. The school had one large classroom and two smaller rooms used as cloakrooms. The school was equipped with slate blackboards and coal oil lamps. The schoolhouse was also used for church services. A wood stove provided heat. Miss Moster, the school's first teacher, taught approximately 35 students and was paid $40 per month.

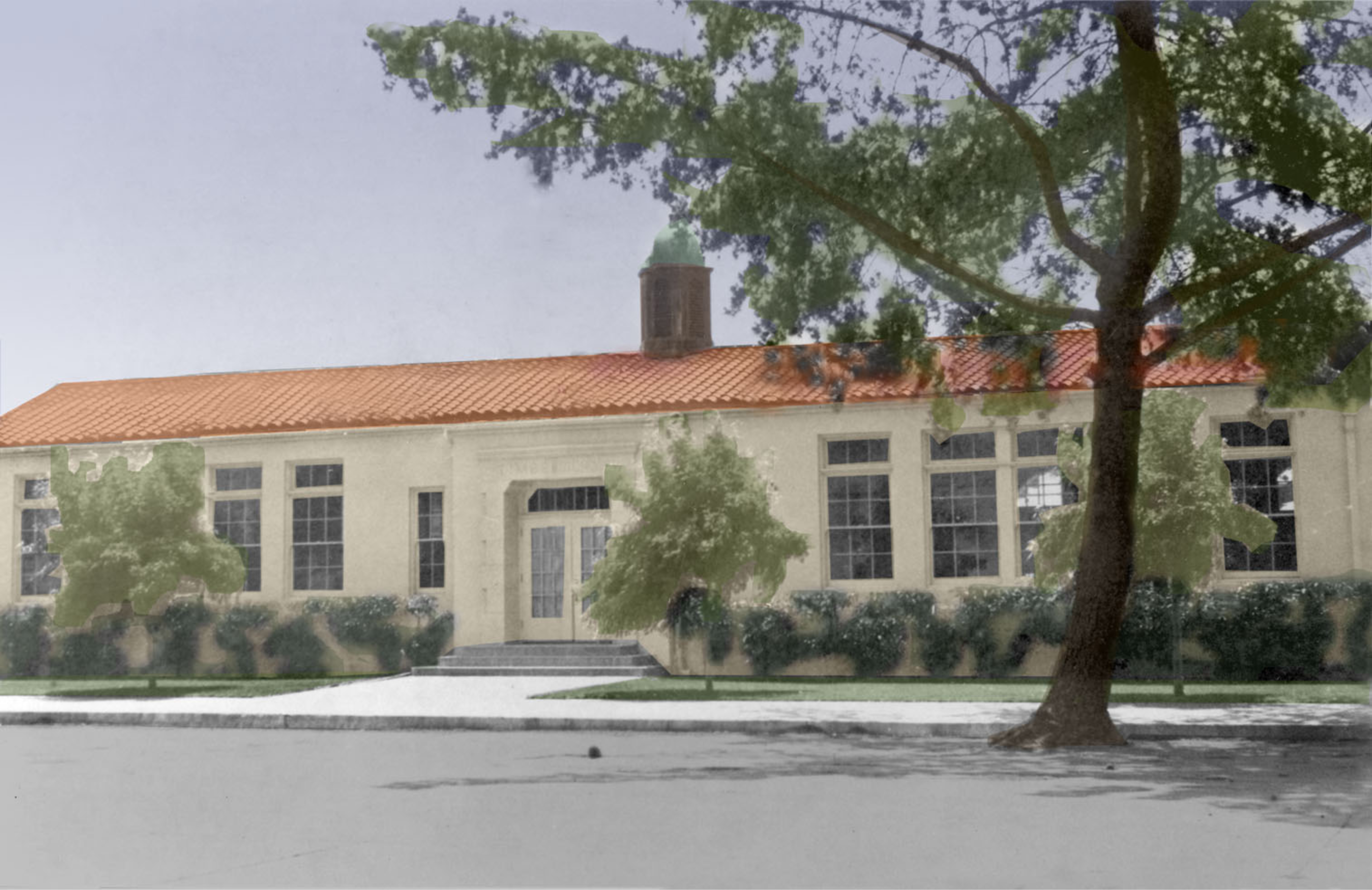
Colorized 1924 Timber Schoolhouse Landmark

Besides being used for educational purposes and church services, the school was used for May Day celebrations, wedding ceremonies, and picnics. The original school was condemned in 1921, and the Timber School Board of Trustees searched for funds to construct a bigger schoolhouse. Distinguished architect Roy C. Wilson of Santa Paula was selected to design the new structure. The new school, constructed in concrete, was completed in the fall of 1924. The original Timber School, located right behind the new one, was demolished and sold as lumber in 1925. As the population of the valley continued to grow, additional classrooms were needed and an auditorium was constructed in 1949. In 1970, new schools like Maple Elementary opened under the Timber School District. In July 1974, Timber School District joined with nearby school districts to form the Conejo Valley Unified School District. The Timber School has been used for district offices and later the Conejo Valley continuation high school, Conejo Valley High School. Currently, it is vacant, awaiting planned development. In the meantime, it has attracted vandalism and needed to be boarded up following a Fire Protection District inspection that yielded four fire code violations.

On July 13, 2004, the Thousand Oaks City Council voted unanimously to make the Timber School City Landmark No. 12. A replica of the original 1889 school was completed in 1994 and is located at the grounds of the Stagecoach Inn Museum.

== Redevelopment plans ==
In June 2023, MBK Rental Living announced it has purchased the 7.1-acre site for the development of a 218-unit luxury multifamily community. The project is a joint venture between MBK and Prime Life Technologies Corp., a Japan-based homebuilding company. The co-developers plan to break ground in Summer 2024, with the opening expected in late 2026. Upon completion, 12 percent of the units will be designated as affordable.

In 2015, the developer, Daylight Thousand Oaks LLC, purchased the 10-acre (4.0 ha) site from Conejo Valley Unified School District for $8.9 million. After submitting and withdrawing a plan containing "two hotels and restaurants", the developer submitted a plan containing 210 apartments (26 designated affordable) and a 120-room hotel in mid-2019 and won pre-approval and residential unit allocation under 1996's Measure E (which restricts the area's growth by establishing a maximum number of buildable units) from the Thousand Oaks City Council. The plan incorporates both the schoolhouse and auditorium as administrative offices and community rooms. Council members remarked that the development would provide "needed housing" and hoped it might be able to lower rents.

However, nearby residents have expressed disapproval of the current plan, citing parking issues, view-obstruction, and the project's density. Currently, the developer is in the process of writing and submitting a formal application for the development.

== See also ==
- Stagecoach Inn
- Ventura County Historic Landmarks & Points of Interest
