= Newbury Road =

Street in Newbury Park, California

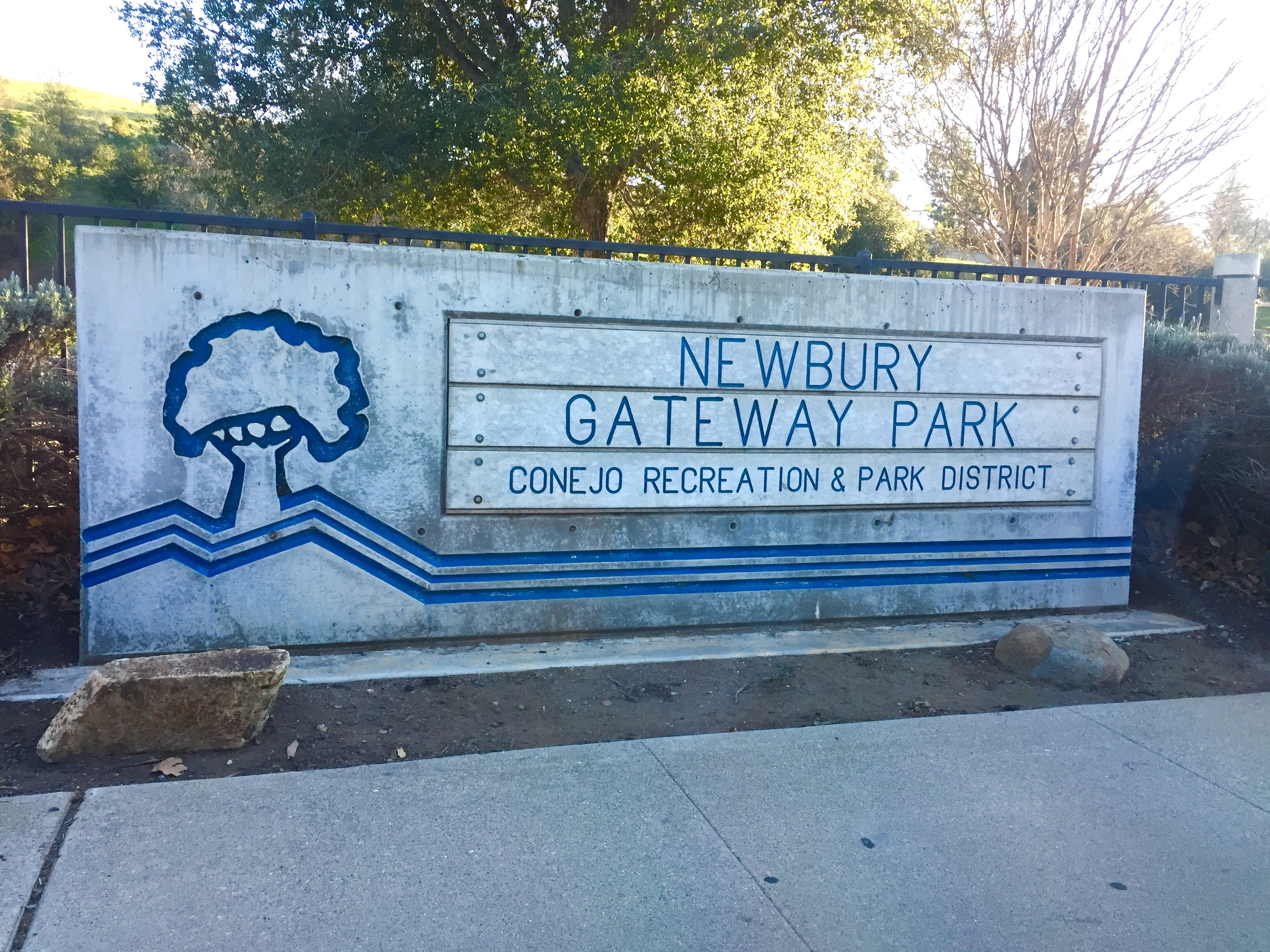
Newbury Road stretches from Walnut Grove Park to Newbury Gateway Park.

Newbury Road is the main street in Newbury Park, California, and runs parallel to the U.S. Route 101 (Ventura Freeway). The road is named for the town’s founder, Egbert Starr Newbury. The historic Newbury Park Post Office has had several locations on Newbury Road, including at the Stagecoach Plaza, a shopping complex with a name that implies the stagecoach heritage of the area. Stagecoach Plaza houses 14 restaurants and shops, and it is adjacent to additional shops on both sides.

The road stretches from Newbury Gateway Park in the west to Walnut Grove Park in the east. Newbury Gateway Park is a seven-acre (2.8 ha) park at the base of a hill which is most notable for is native flora, including an oak grove with over a hundred oak trees. Two large oak trees stand near its entry. Newbury Park Library and the adjacent Thousand Oaks Community Gallery are located just across Borchard Road from the park, immediately west of Newbury Road.

On its opposite end, Walnut Grove Park is located at the intersection of Newbury- and Windtree Avenue. Named for its many walnut trees, the six-acre (2.4 ha) park was developed in 1994. The park sits 0.3 miles (0.48 km) from Lynn Road, which makes up Newbury Park’s eastern border with Thousand Oaks proper. The park also houses Walnut Grove Equestrian Center with its 14 acres (5.7 ha) of equestrian and hiking trails, horse arenas, stalls, and picnic facilities. Handball and basketball courts are found in the park, along with barbecue grills, a playground, a hiking trail, and picnic tables. Greenmeadow Trail from the park leads to Lynn Road.

== Timber School ==
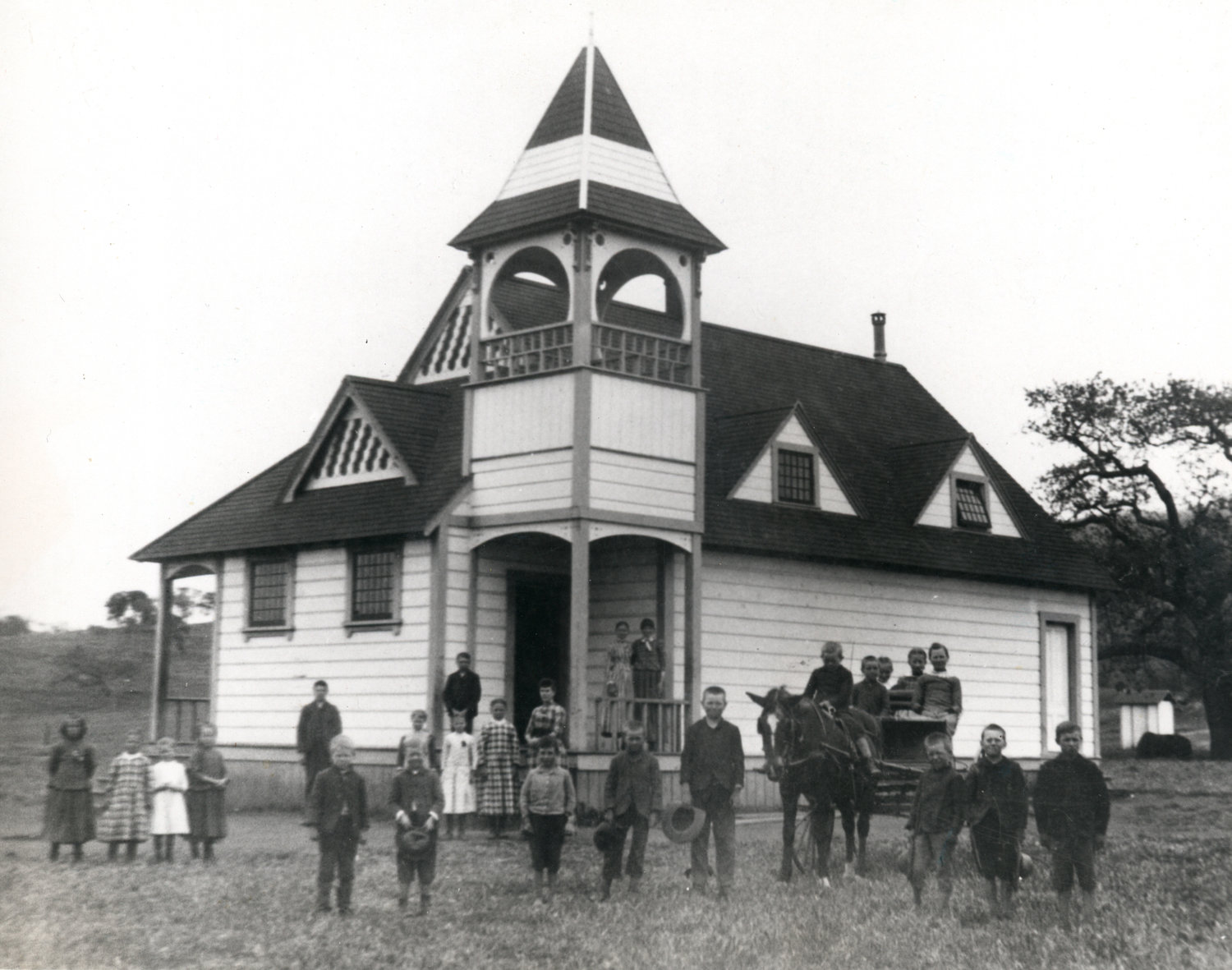
Timber School in the 1890s, by today's intersection of Newbury and Kelley roads

Newbury Road is home to the historic Timber School, a designated Ventura County Historical Landmark as well as City of Thousand Oaks Landmark No. 12. The current 1924 Timber School is located few feet from where the original 1889 Timber School was located, which was Newbury Park’s first school. The current structure at 1872 Newbury Road, on the campus of Conejo Valley High School, is the oldest remaining school in Thousand Oaks, and the oldest remaining public building in the Conejo Valley.

== Newbury Park Post Office ==
The Newbury Park Post Office has been relocated numerous times. It was relocated to a 10-by-12-foot (3.0 by 3.7 m) building at 1200 Newbury Road in 1942, and it moved into a larger building at 1602 Newbury Road in 1968. The post office moved from the Stagecoach Plaza on Newbury Road to 3401 Grande Vista Drive on June 22, 2013. The move was initiated to cut costs, and the post office was moved from a leased facility near shops and restaurants at Newbury Road and relocated to a Postal Service-owned annex in a business park for letter carrier operations.

When the historic post office was to be relocated from Newbury Road in the mid 1960s, Reba Hays Jeffries gave the successful low bid for a new post office in 1966. It was located at 1602 Newbury Road from 1968 to 2013.
