= Gardens of the World =

Botanical garden in Thousand Oaks, California

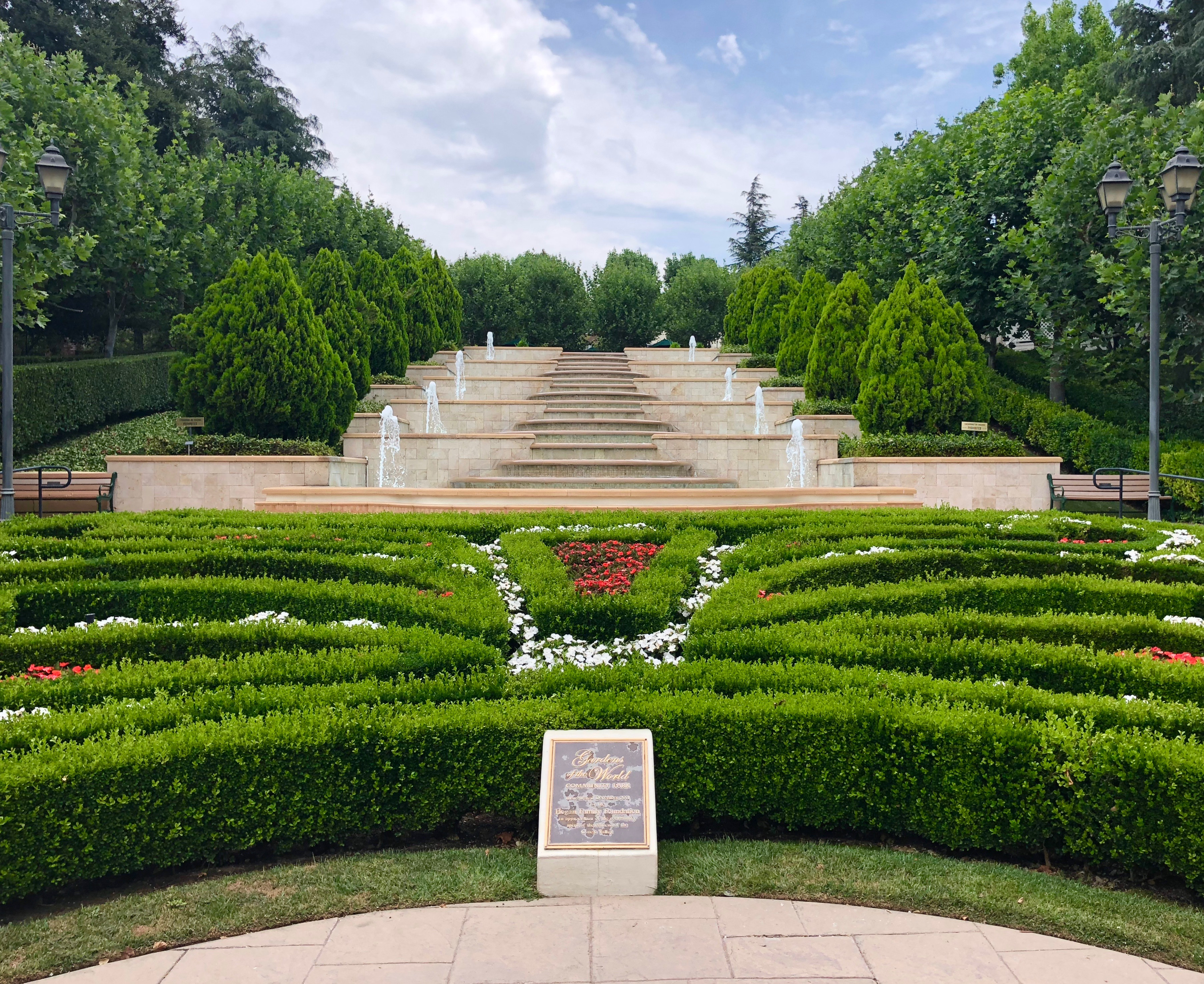
- French Waterfall by entrance

- Location within California Location within the United States
- Type: Botanical garden
- Location: Thousand Oaks, California, United States
- Coordinates: 34°10′35″N 118°50′54″W
- Area: 4.5 acres (18,000 m^{2})
- Opened: December 2001
- Operator: Hogan Family Foundation
- Status: Open
- Website: www.gardensoftheworld.info

Gardens of the World is a botanical garden in Thousand Oaks, California, situated directly across Thousand Oaks Boulevard from Thousand Oaks Civic Arts Plaza, within the downtown core of the city. Established in 2001, the park was given to the city by the owners of a local travel agency. It is home to a French garden and waterfall, an English rose garden, an Italian grapevine garden and a Japanese garden with koi ponds and a pagoda. The park is used for walking and picnicking, and guided tours of the gardens are available. The Californian Mission Courtyard includes native California flora and murals of the remaining 21 California Missions. There is also a statue of Father Junipero Serra in this part of the park. The botanical garden is 4.5 acres (1.8 ha).

== Overview ==
The gardens in the park are connected by a concrete trail which loops the gardens. The iron entry gate from across the Civic Arts Plaza leads onto a parterre in the French Garden in front of a massive waterfall. To the right through the arches lies the English Perennial and Rose Gardens and its pergola. This garden features 400 rose bushes. The Italian Garden near the Bandstand lawn contains a grape arbor and an Italian chain fountain. Tucked in the corner is the Japanese Garden featuring a koi pond, decorative rock waterfall, a pagoda and stream with a wooden bridge. The California Mission Courtyard memorates the California Missions with murals of the 21 remaining missions, along with a Spanish fountain. The gardens were designed by landscape artist, Wendy Harper from Moorpark.

=== Exhibits ===
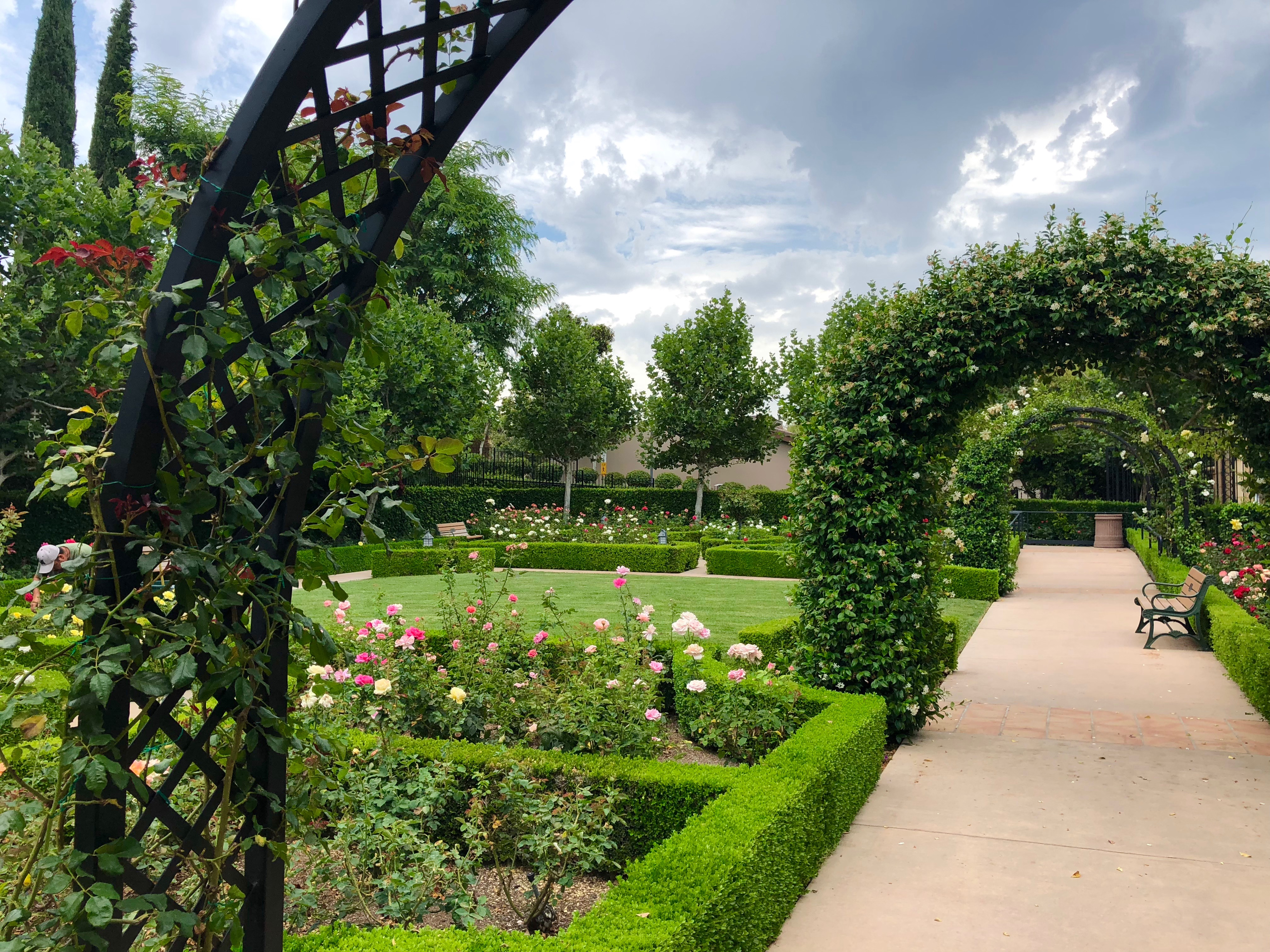
The English Rose Garden.

It contains five gardens:

- French Garden with its large cascading waterfall lies by the park's iron entry gates, immediately across Thousand Oaks Boulevard from the Civic Arts Plaza. There are two types of parterres found in this garden: one shaped in the form of a butterfly ("papillon") and another in shape of the Sun. The French Fountain is an authentic replica of one found at Versailles, France. Flowers and low boxwood hedges arranged in intricate design surround the foot of the waterfall.
- English Perennial and Rose Garden contains 400 rose bushes with a variety of colors and species. The garden is home to two types of roses: Bush- and Climber roses. It has a pergola with numerous arches and places for seating.
- Italian Garden features a lush grape arbor and an Italian chain fountain designed with historic Italian architecture. This garden also exhibits a number of distinctive Cypress trees often found at Italy's famed gardens. A Venus de Milo statue is located on top of the fountain. Cabernet- and chardonnay grapes are represented.
- Japanese Garden is home to an authentic Japanese Pagoda surrounded by a Koi pond, Japanese-design bridges and bamboo shoots. A decorative waterfall, Dragon's Gate Waterfall, and a stream are also found here. The waterfall is named for the fable that if a Koi can swim to the top of the falls, it will turn into a dragon. Rock formations in the pond represent a crane and a turtle, symbols of longevity.
- Mission Courtyard exhibits California's mission trail. A statue of Junípero Serra, the priest who founded many of the California Missions, is near the entrance to courtyard. Colorful, hand-painted murals of 21 missions painted by local artists Bridget Duffy and Mark Fenton line the courtyard. Animal prints can be seen in the hand-made tiles and are traditional symbols of good luck. The Spanish Fountain in the center of the courtyard is traditionally designed in three levels, so that chickens, horses, and people all could drink from the same fountain. The courtyard is surrounded by olive and citrus trees.

In the center of the gardens is a replica of the American/Victorian Bandstand. The bandstand functions as an amphitheater and is where musical performances take place.

== Gallery ==
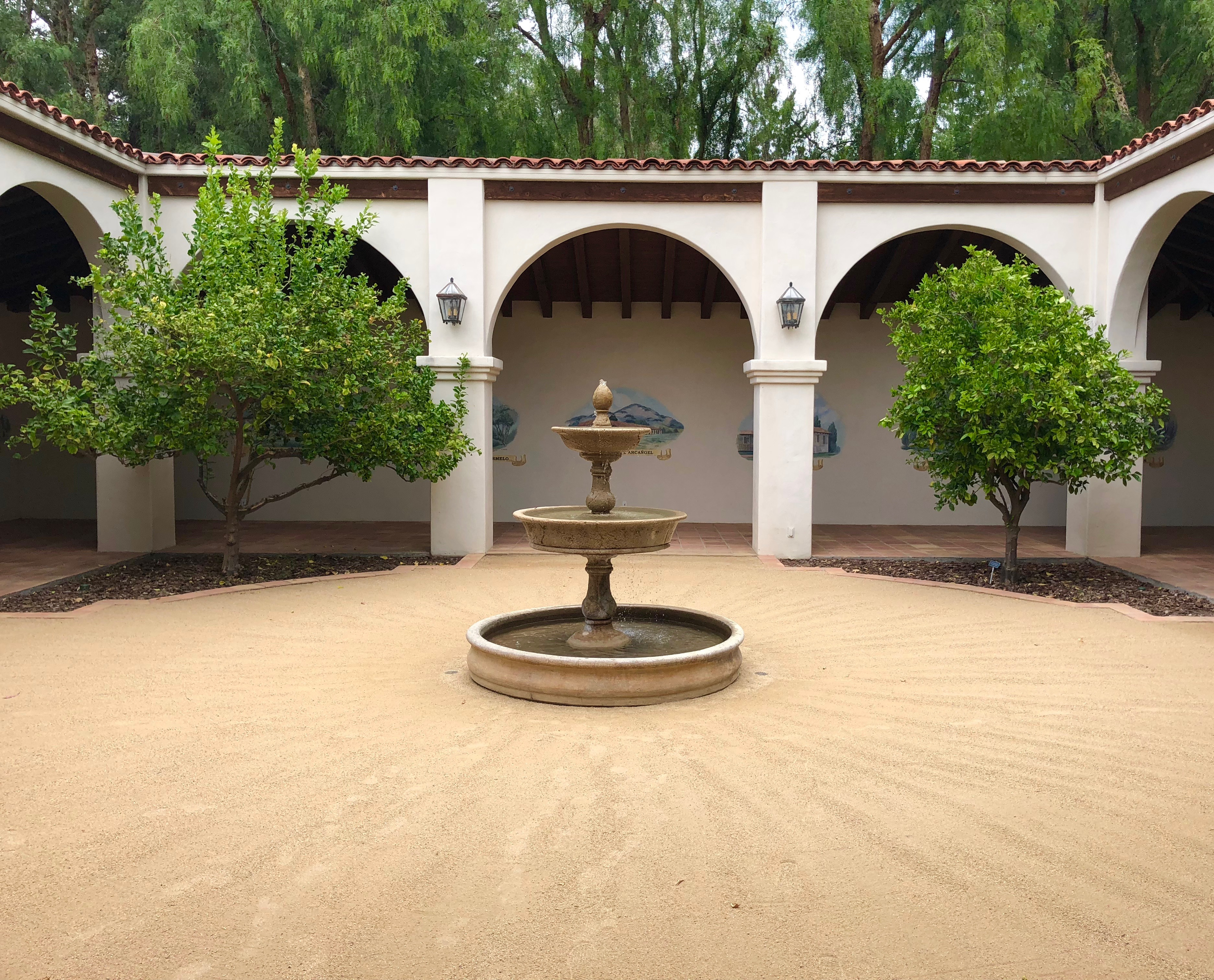
Spanish Fountain in the Mission Courtyard.

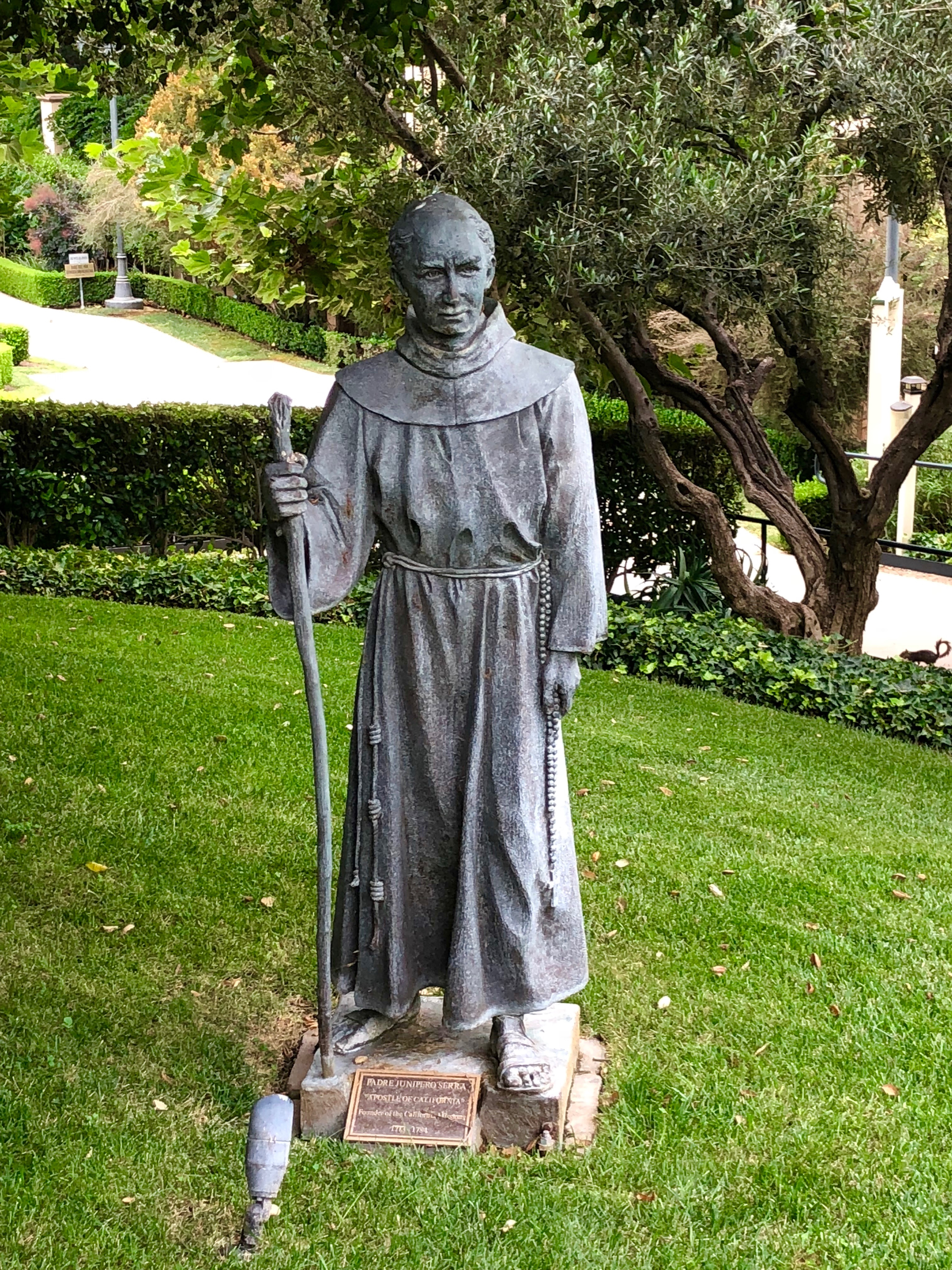
Statue of Junípero Serra.

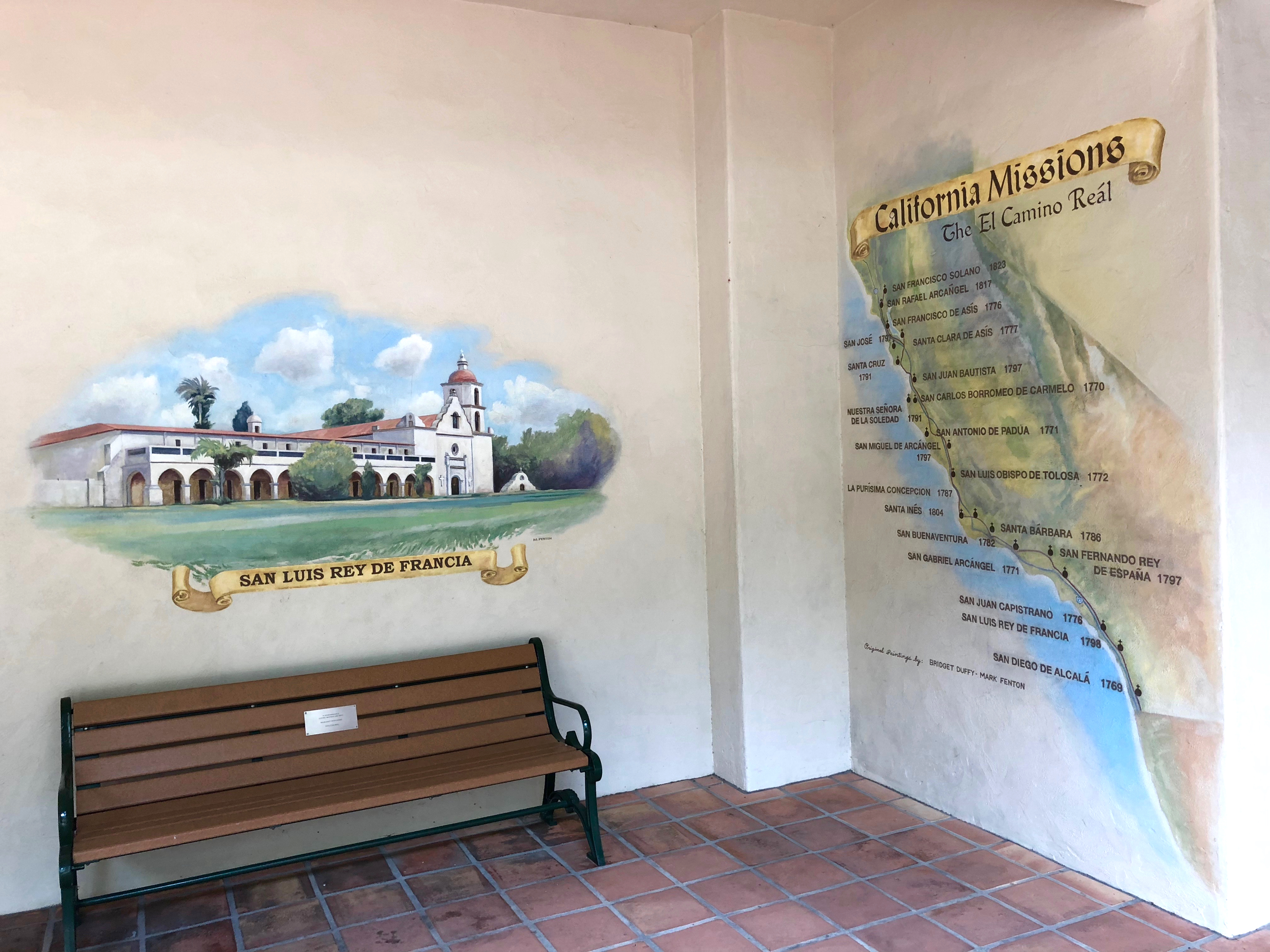
Mission mural.

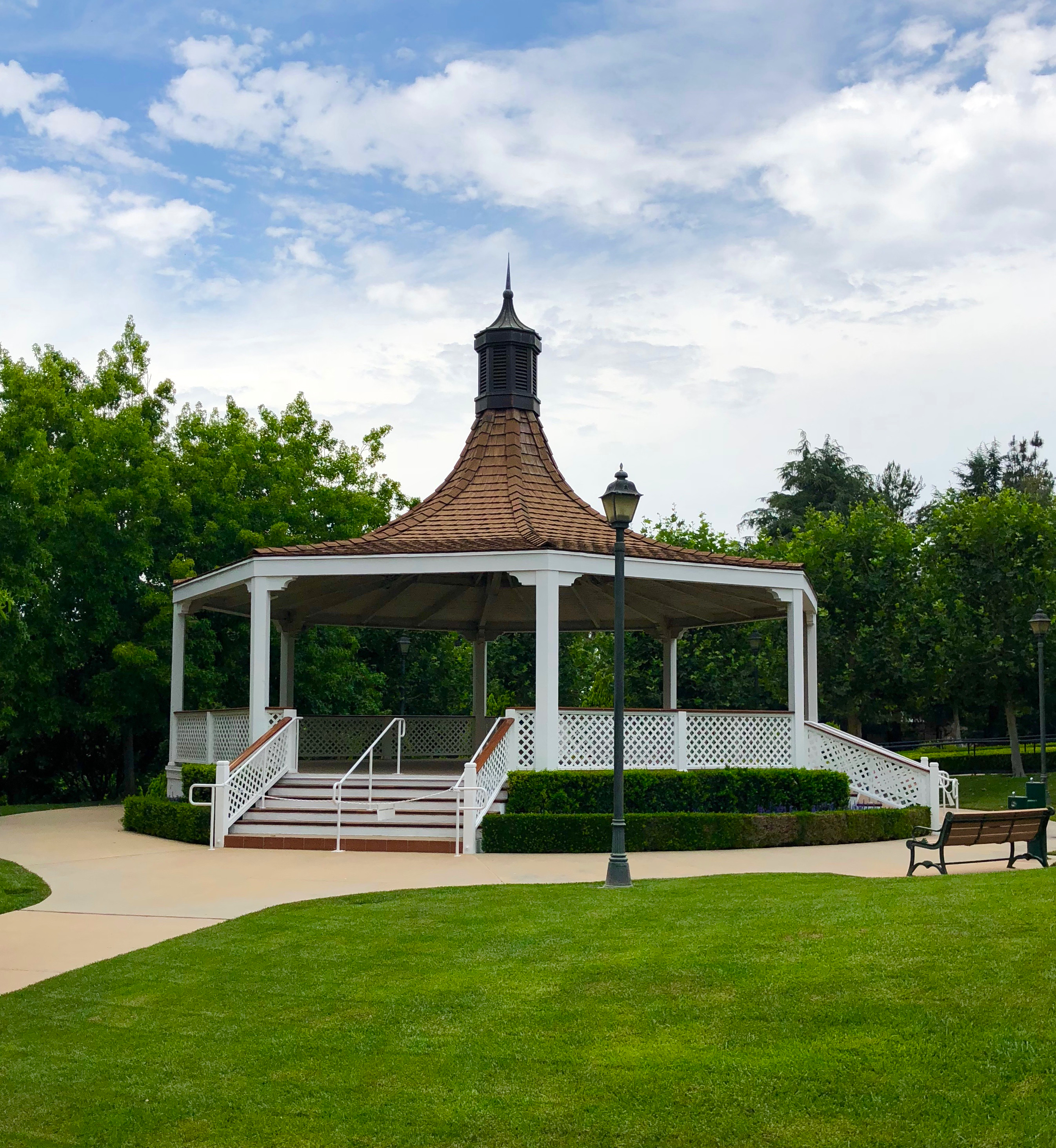
Replica of the American Bandstand.
