= Elmer Ramsey =

American conductor and professor (1930–2018)

Elmer Hollis Ramsey (June 3, 1930 – February 9, 2018) was the founder and conductor of Conejo Symphony Orchestra, which was a precursor to the New West Symphony. He also established the Conejo Pops Orchestra. Ramsey was a professor at California Lutheran University from 1965 to 1992. He was the co-founder of the local Oakleaf Music Festival and instrumental in the development of the Thousand Oaks Civic Arts Plaza.

== Early life ==
Ramsey was born in North Dakota, but grew up in Kelso, Washington. He graduated from the University of Portland and had his own 1940's-style big band on a Washington radio station. Ramsey later did West Coast tours with singers such as Mel Tormé. He also did studio work for NBC and 20th Century Fox and conducted concerts at venues in the UK, Israel, Germany, and Austria. He has performed on The Ford Show and The Jimmy Durante Show.

Ramsey and his wife Elaine and their children moved to Los Angeles in 1956. His California debut took place in 1958 with Ferde Grofe at the Hollywood Bowl. He moved to Thousand Oaks in 1965 in order to become a music professor at California Lutheran University. At CLU he became the director and conductor of the Conejo Symphony Orchestra, and also wrote the university's fight song. Under the direction of Ramsey, the Cal Lutheran orchestra and choir performed at the Dorothy Chandler Pavilion with musicians such as Marni Nixon, Roger Williams, Gordon MacRae and Florence Henderson. He conducted concerts for 18 years at the Dorothy Chandler Pavilion in Los Angeles.

In 1992 Ramsey received the Don Triunfo Award from the Conejo Historical Society. He received an honorary Doctor of Humane Letters from California Lutheran University in 2009.
