= Thousand Oaks Civic Arts Plaza =

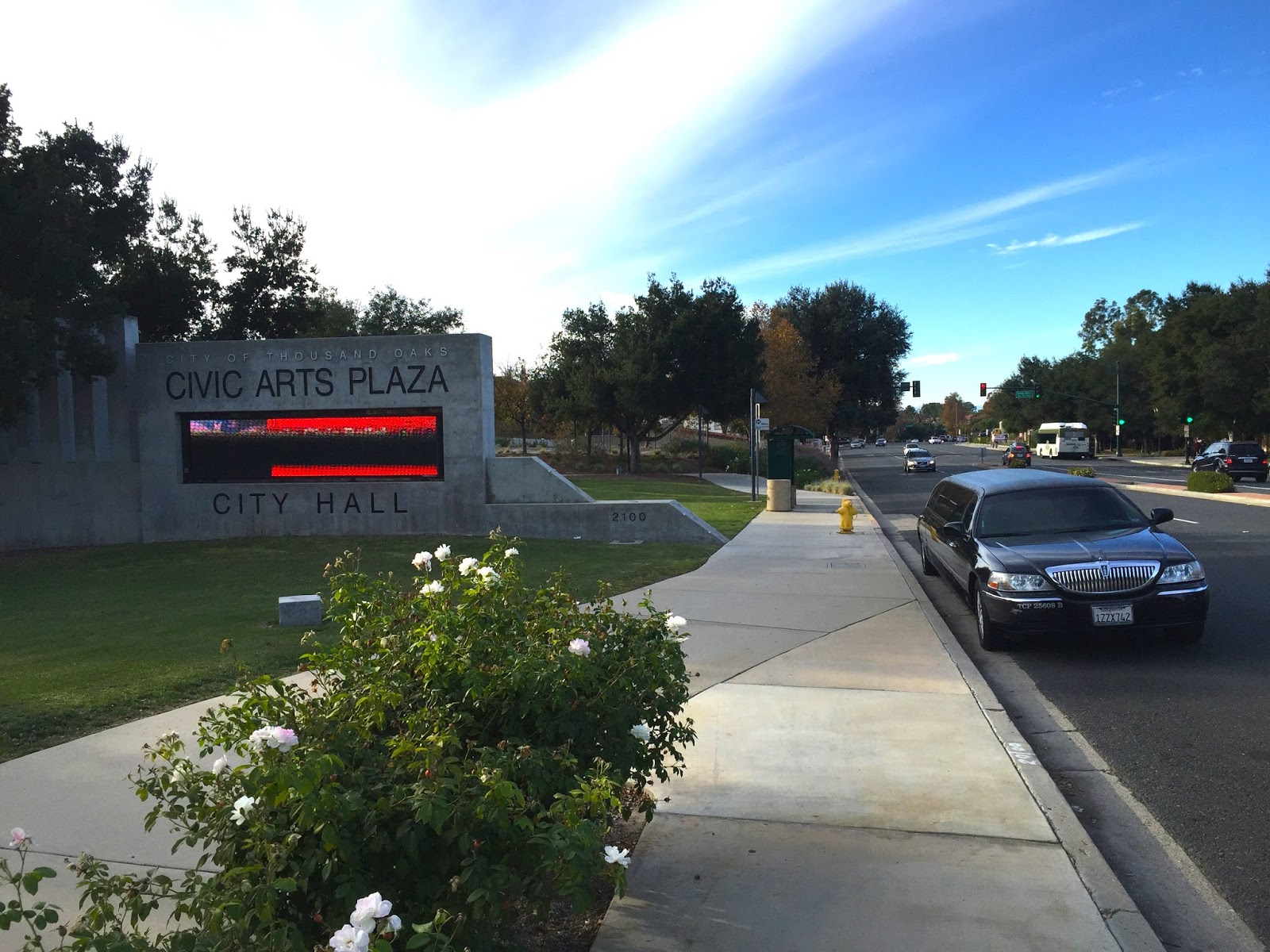
- Limousine at Civic Arts Plaza
- Interactive map of Thousand Oaks Civic Arts Plaza
- Address: 2100 Thousand Oaks Boulevard; Thousand Oaks, California; United States
- Coordinates: 34.1745°N 118.8486°W
- Owner: City of Thousand Oaks
- Operator: City of Thousand Oaks
- Capacity: Fred Kavli Theatre: 1,800; Janet and Ray Scherr Forum Theatre: 400
- Type: Performing arts center

Construction
- Opened: 1994; 32 years ago
- Architect: Antoine Predock

Website
- www.civicartsplaza.com

The Thousand Oaks Civic Arts Plaza is a performing arts center and city hall for the city of Thousand Oaks, California. Across Thousand Oaks Boulevard from Gardens of the World, the site is considered the downtown core of the city. City hall includes Planning and Building Department, Public Works and other city departments. A park within the site is named for Richard Carpenter and his wife Mary.

The immediate areas surrounding Thousand Oaks Civic Arts Plaza was among the first populated parts of the Conejo Valley. The site, which was previously home to the Jungleland USA theme park, was home to some of the valley's first settlements in the 19th century. Prior to the settlers, the area was inhabited by the Chumash Native-Americans.

== Structure ==
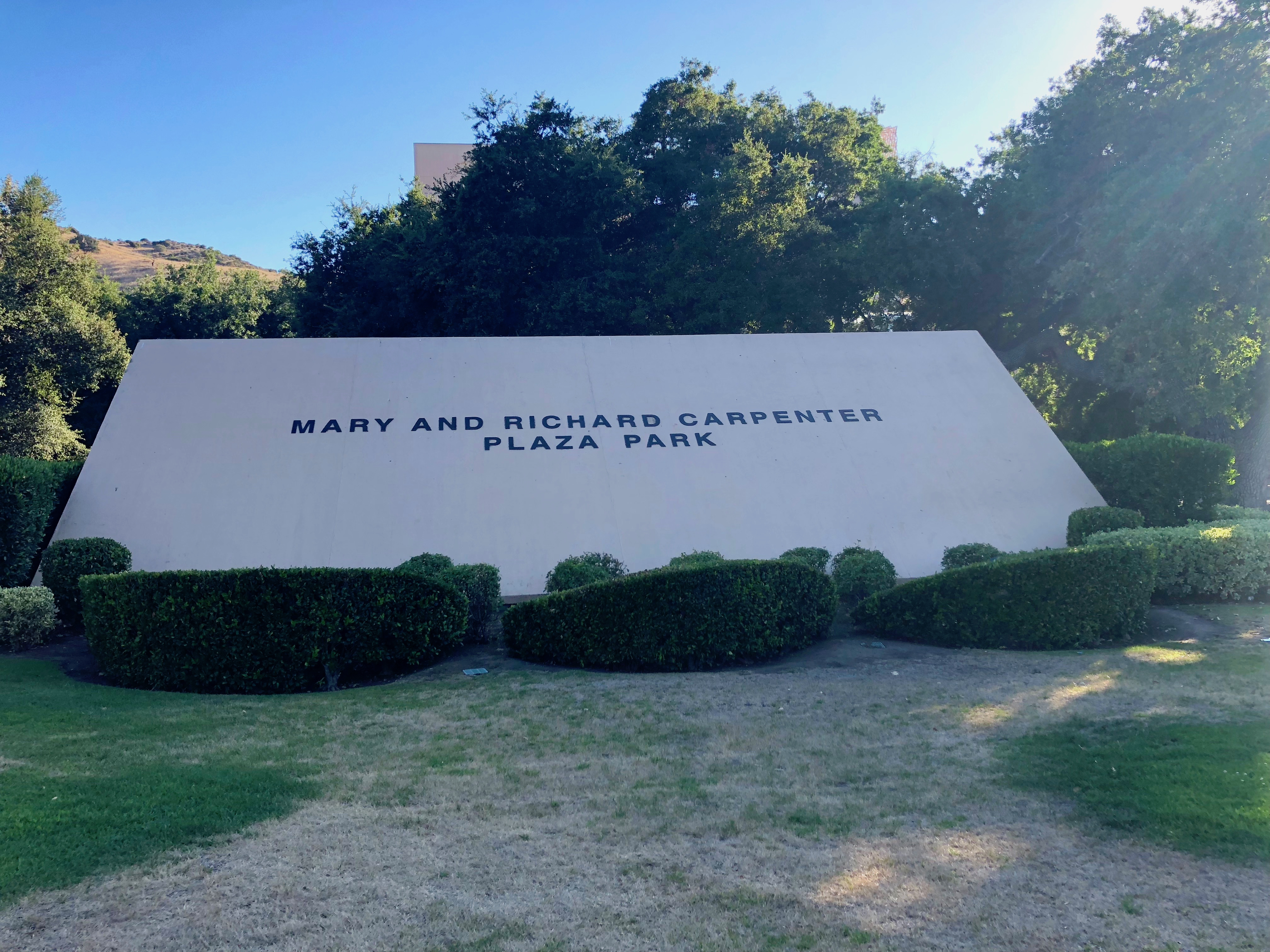
An adjacent park is named for Richard Carpenter and his wife Mary.

Constructed in 1994 at cost of $63.8 million, the site was formerly Jungleland. The project was designed by AIA Gold Medal architect Antoine Predock in combined Postmodern and Modern architecture styles including large sculptures mounted to the sides of the building.

The 210,000 sq. ft. building is ornamented with Indian sandstone. At its highest, the building towers ten stories; at its lowest, 22 feet under ground where it is anchored in volcanic rock. The site was home to a Chumash summer camp in pre-colonial times, known as Ipuc (Ven-654). In the 19th century, the site was land which belonged to Egbert Starr Newbury where he established the Conejo Valley's first post office.

== Performing arts center ==
Bank of America Performing Arts Center includes the Fred Kavli Theatre, an 1,800-seat theater Kavli Theatre and the 394-seat Janet & Ray Scherr Forum. Music director Elmer Ramsey was instrumental in the development of the Thousand Oaks Civic Arts Plaza. The New West Symphony is the resident orchestra. They are also resident orchestra of the Oxnard Performing Arts Center and Santa Monica's Barnum Hall.

Notable performers here have included Switchfoot, Jason Mraz, Paul Anka, Colbie Caillat, Vince Gill, Art Garfunkel, Kenny Rogers, The Beach Boys, Mary Chapin Carpenter, Sara Evans, Willie Nelson, Kris Kristofferson, and Peter, Paul and Mary. Entertainers such as Liza Minnelli, Bill Cosby, David Copperfield, B. B. King, Sheryl Crow, Mikhail Baryshnikov, David Foster, and Jonathan Antoine have also performed.

== See also ==
- List of concert halls
