= Thousand Oaks Boulevard =

Street in the Ventura County, California

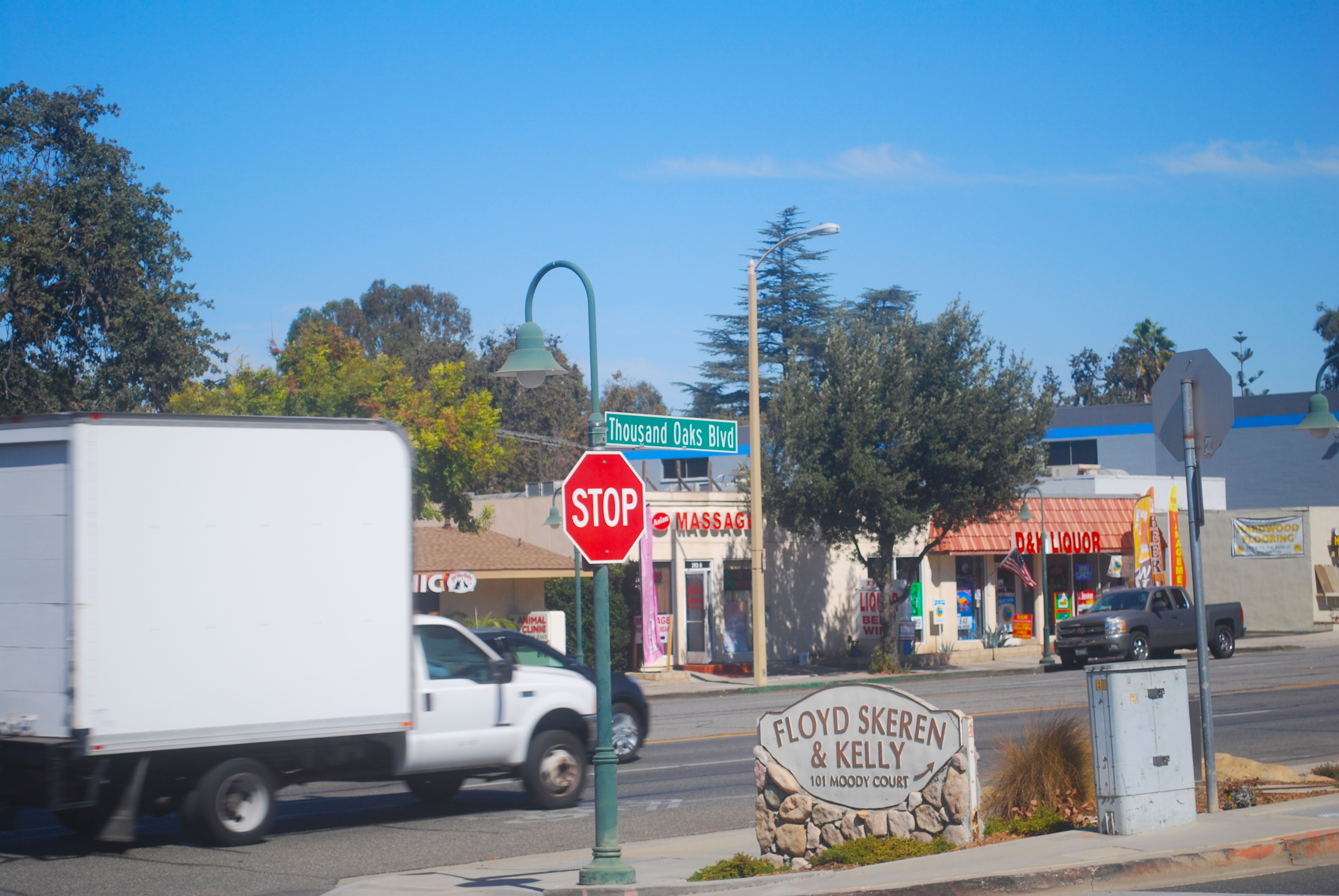
- Location: Conejo Valley, United States

Thousand Oaks Boulevard, previously known as Ventura Boulevard, is a street in the Conejo Valley, primarily in Ventura County but also in Los Angeles County, California. It stretches from Thousand Oaks through Westlake Village to Agoura Hills. In Thousand Oaks, it is located in the downtown area and was also known as Main Street until the Moorpark Freeway (SR 23) was completed in the 1960s. Today it remains one of the busiest commercial areas in Thousand Oaks, although many businesses are also located at The Oaks and Janss Marketplace. It is Thousand Oaks’ major east-west thoroughfare, connecting The Oaks mall on the west to Thousand Oaks Civic Arts Plaza in the east. It runs parallel to the Ventura Freeway (US 101). As of 2017, over 230 businesses are housed on Thousand Oaks Boulevard.

It was one of the first streets in the city. Thousand Oaks Civic Arts Plaza and Gardens of the World are located on Thousand Oaks Boulevard. It is also home of the Thousand Oaks Auto Mall.

Thousand Oaks Boulevard has been featured in movies such as It Happened One Night (1934), Walk on the Wild Side (1962) and Thelma & Louise (1991).
