= Stagecoach Inn (California) =

- Grand Union Hotel
- U.S. National Register of Historic Places
- California Historical Landmark
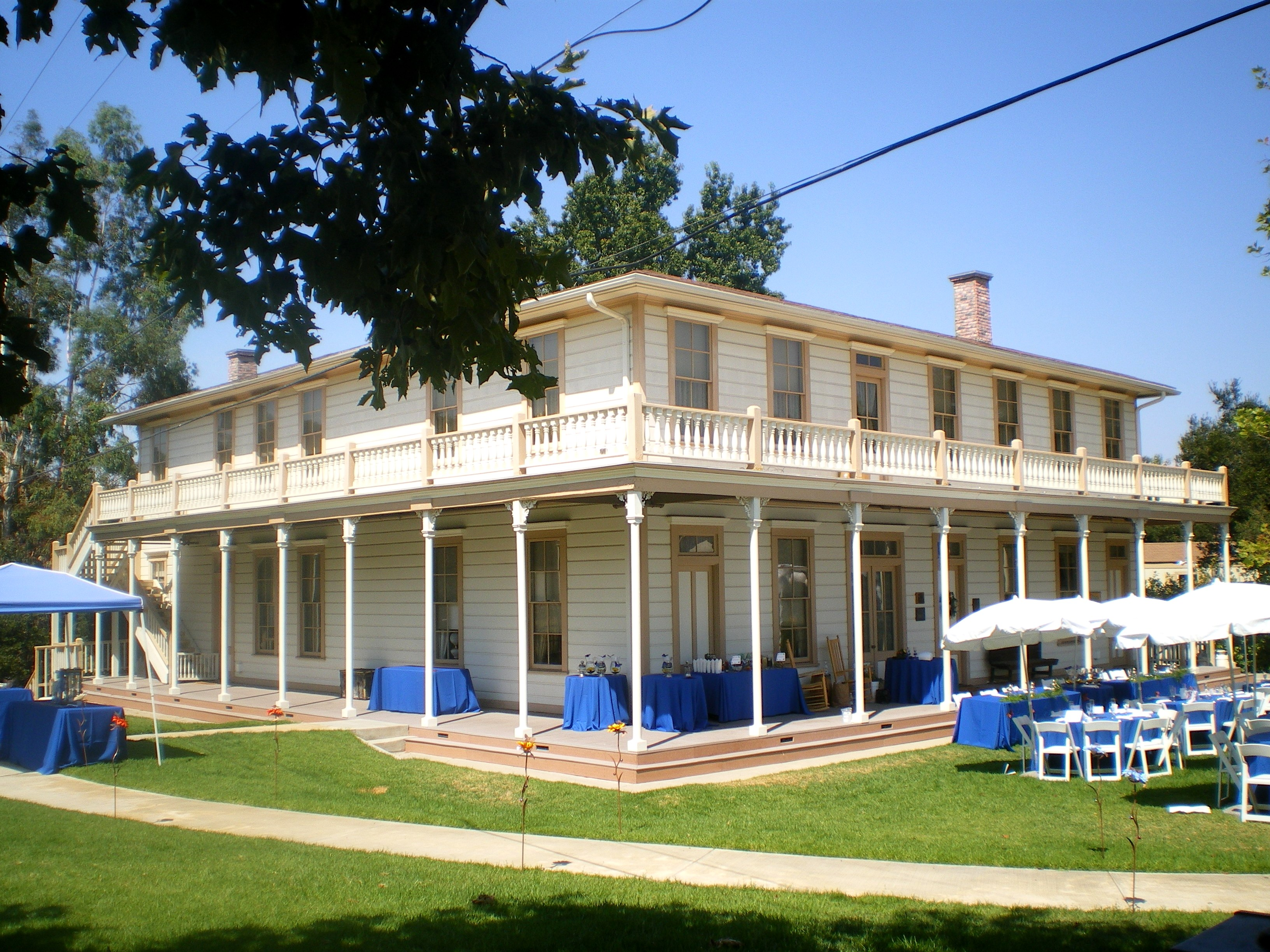
- Stagecoach Inn Museum, September 2008
- Location: 51 Ventu Park Rd., Newbury Park, California
- Coordinates: 34°10′41″N 118°54′41″W
- Built: 1876
- NRHP reference No.: 75000495
- CHISL No.: 659

Significant dates
- Added to NRHP: December 30, 1975
- Designated CHISL: 1958

The Stagecoach Inn Museum in Newbury Park, California, originally known as the Grand Union Hotel, was used as a resting area for people who traveled from Los Angeles to Santa Barbara. Besides a hotel and stagecoach stop, it has also been used as a post office, church, restaurant and military school. It is California Historical Landmark No. 659 and is listed in the National Register of Historic Places. It played a major role in the development of the stage line transportation network in California. The hotel was also the first business venture in the Conejo Valley.

Today, the inn is owned by the Conejo Recreation and Park Department and operated as a historic museum. The museum includes a rebuilt Timber School (originally built in 1889), a carriage house and blacksmith shop, nature trails, and the "Tri-Village", a small group of three houses: the pioneer house, the adobe, and the Chumash "ap". There is also a gift shop located inside the museum. A director and volunteers operate the museum, being members of the Conejo Valley Historical Society (CVHS). There is also a Jr. Docent program for children and teenagers aged 8–18. It is a dominant cultural and educational gathering place for thousands of residents and visitors to Newbury Park.

The Stagecoach Inn Museum is allegedly haunted, and is considered one of California's most famous haunted places.

== Names and owners ==
The Stagecoach Inn Museum has had a variety of names and owners:

- 1876-1878: James Hammell (Grand Union Hotel and El Grande Hotel)
- 1878-1885 : J.B. Redfield (Hammell House)
- 1885-1926 Cecil and Cicelie Haigh (Conejo Hotel at Timberville, later Big Hotel)
- 1926-1957 Simon and Ethel Hays (several, including The Old Hotel and Roadhouse)
- 1957-1964: H. Allen Hays (Conejo Recreation and Park District took over operations in 1964)

== History ==
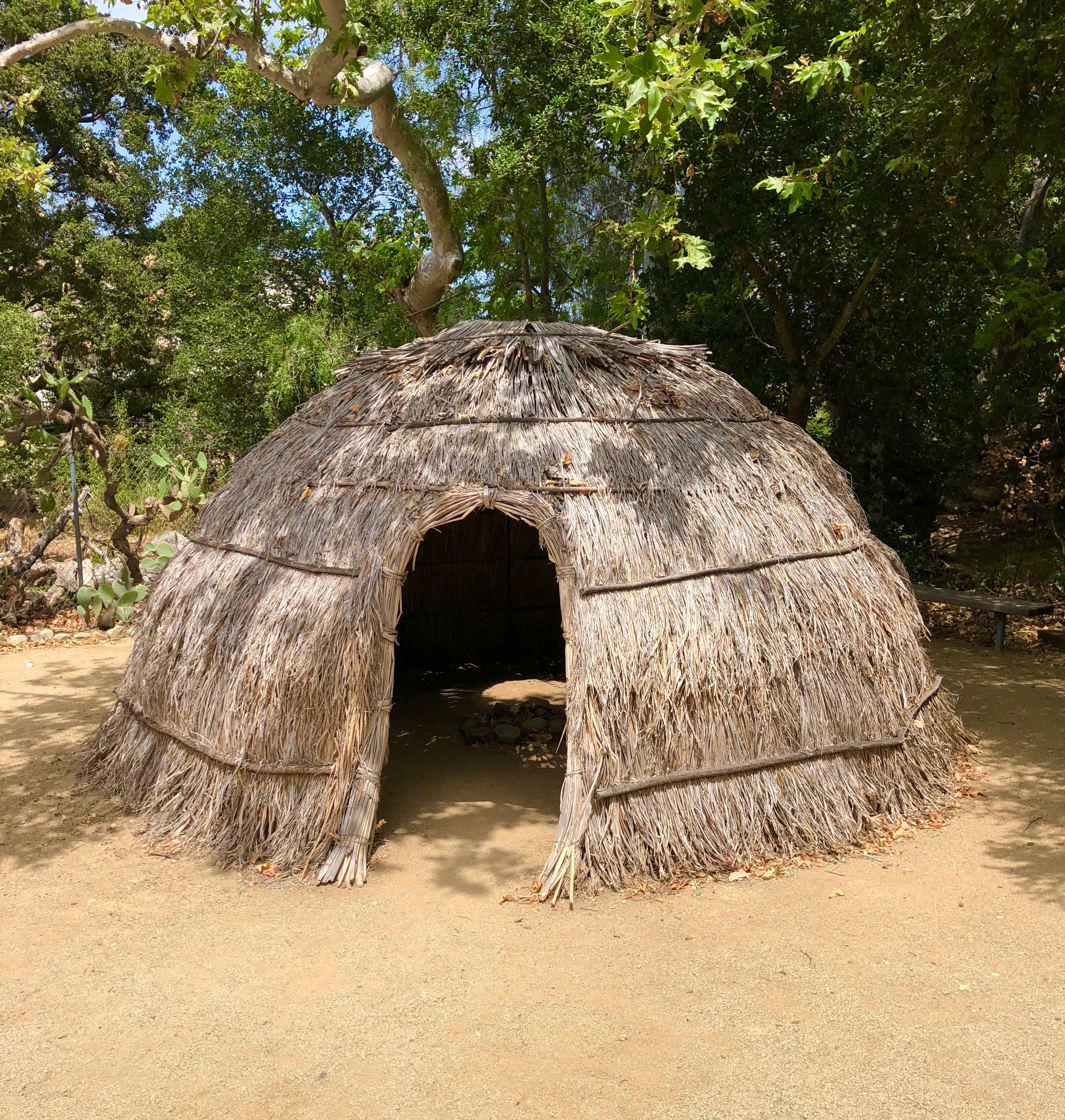
Rebuilt Chumash "ap" at the Tri-Village Complex.

James Hammell was a carpenter in Santa Barbara who planned to construct a hotel along the stagecoach route from Los Angeles to Santa Barbara. After talking to John Edwards about his plans in the late 19th century, Hammell purchased 4,200 acres of land from Edwards. Near what is now Highway 101 and Ventu Park Road is where Hammell first began constructing the hotel. The Grand Union Hotel was constructed in 1876 and was originally planned as a stopover for travelers between Los Angeles and Santa Barbara. It was constructed using redwood brought by sea from Northern California. When it arrived in Port Hueneme, it was moved by multiteam wagons up the Conejo Grade .

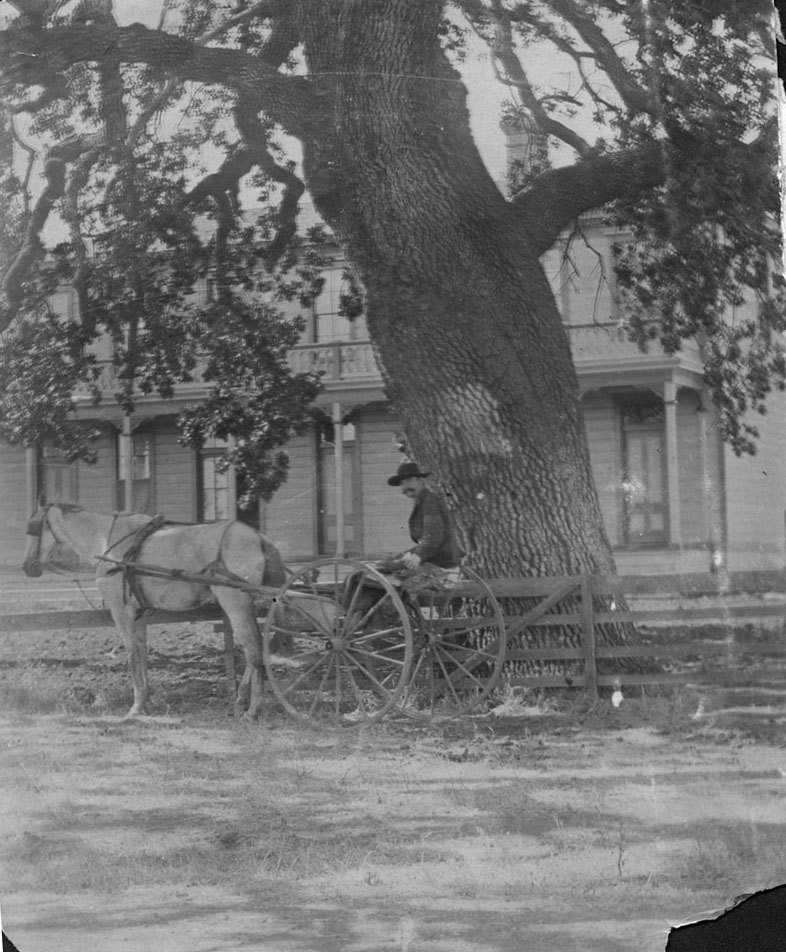
Conejo Hotel at Timberville, 1880s.

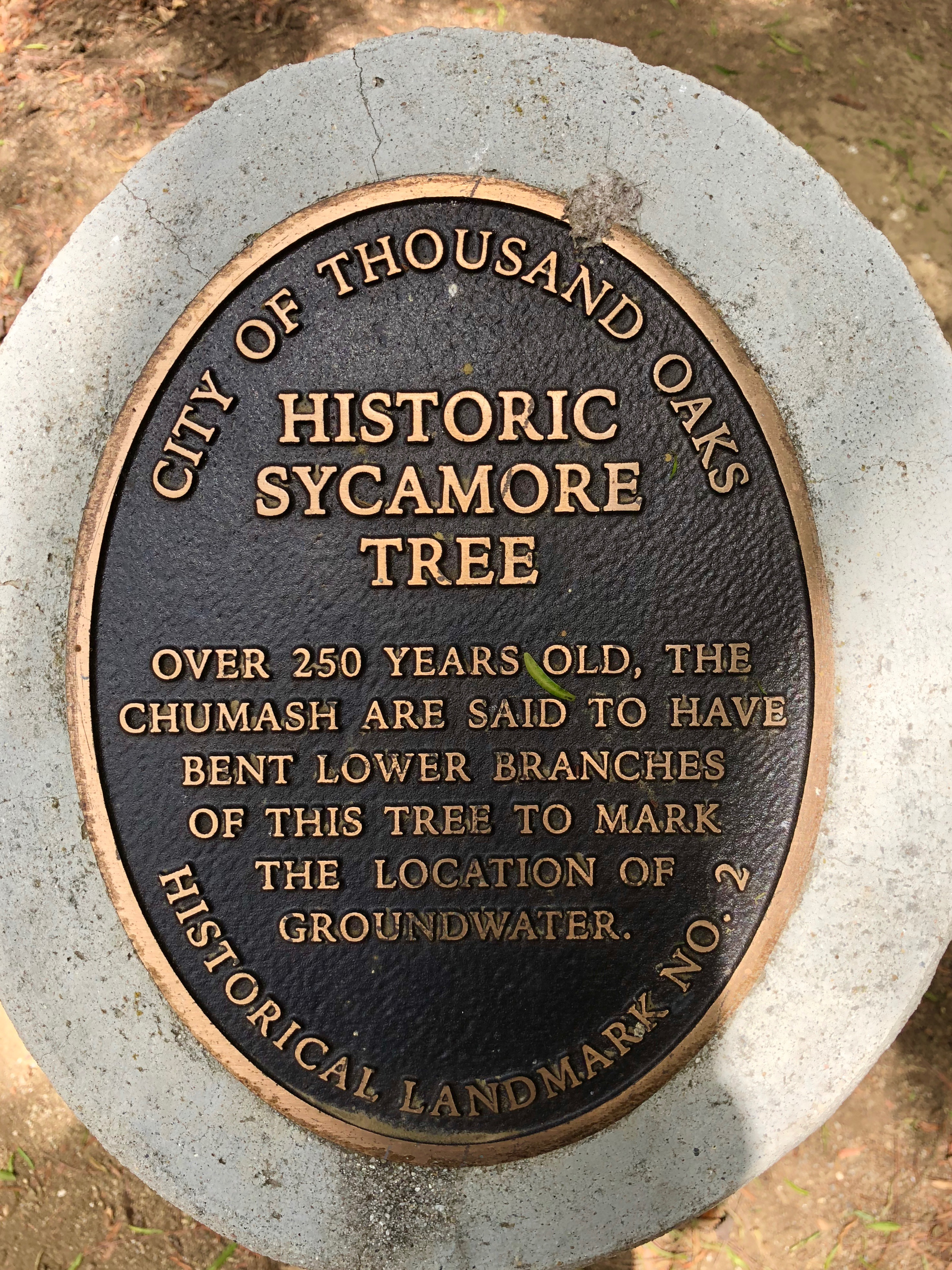
The "Historic Sycamore Tree" is a 300-year-old tree which is a designated county- and city landmark.

One month before the hotel's grand opening, the Coast Line Stage Company changed its route, eliminating Conejo Valley, which meant an end to Hammell's prospects of a mainline stage stop. Hammell did not cancel his plans, but instead opened the hotel in August 1876 although planned for July 4th. It was publicized as a "health and pleasure resort". A countywide newspaper reported: "Shooting, fishing, bathing, and a first-rate table are among the good things on hand for visitors."

Following the drought of 1877-78 James Hammell no longer owned the hotel. After passing through several owners, it was purchased in 1885 by Cecil Haigh, an Englishman. His grandson, H. Allen Hays gave the building and about four acres of land at the present location to the CVHS, who later deeded the property to the Conejo Recreation and Park District in return for a 50-year renewable lease to operate the facilities for cultural and educational purposes. In the 1960s, the hotel was threatened with demolition by the expansion of the Ventura Freeway, but it was granted Historical Landmark status and moved to its present location in 1966. On April 25, 1970, a fire destroyed the museum and its contents. The reconstructed museum was dedicated and opened on July 4, 1976; the second floor was not completed until 1980. The structure was rebuilt using the original Monterey-style architecture.

== Historic designation ==
The Stagecoach Inn Museum was designated Ventura County Historic Landmark No. 30 in 1976 and designated California Historical Landmark No. 659 and also placed on the U.S. National Register of Historic Places in 1975. It is City of Thousand Oaks Historical Landmark No. 1.

Also on the museum grounds is Timber School, a reproduction of the 1889 school.

On July 13, 2004, the Thousand Oaks City Council voted unanimously to declare the 1924 Timber School on Newbury Road City Landmark No. 12.

=== Historic sycamore tree ===
On the museum grounds, near the Tri-Village Complex, is a historic 250+ year old sycamore tree. The tree was designated Ventura County Landmark No. 44 in June 1978, due to its "great age, size, and formation." The tree is also designated Thousand Oaks City Landmark No. 2. Furthermore, General John C. Frémont passed by this tree in 1846 on his way to sign a treaty with General Andrés Pico to secure California's annexation to the U.S. The Chumash Indians are said to have bent the lower branches to mark the location of underground water.

== Exhibits ==
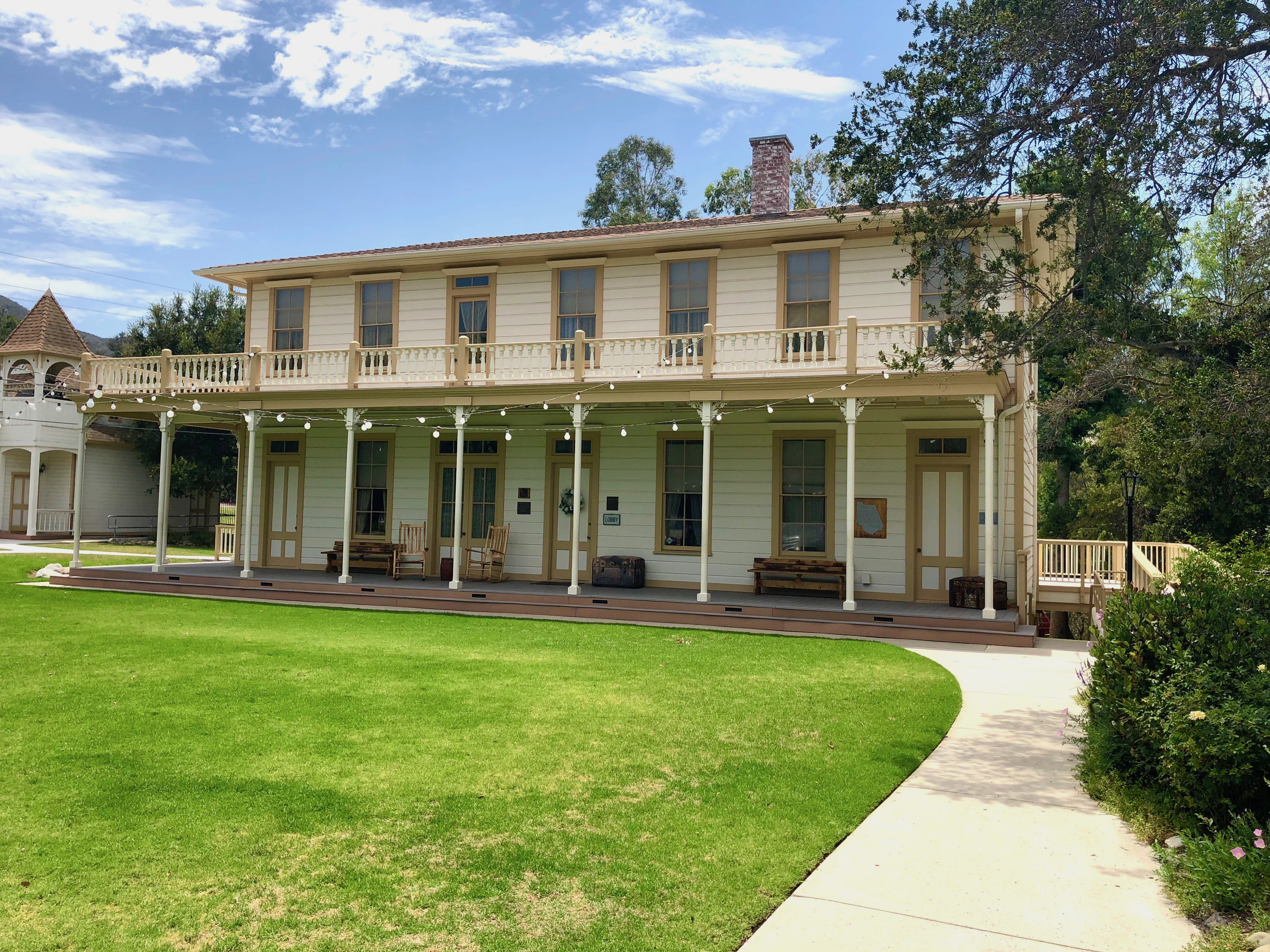
Grand Union Hotel originally operated as a health resort.

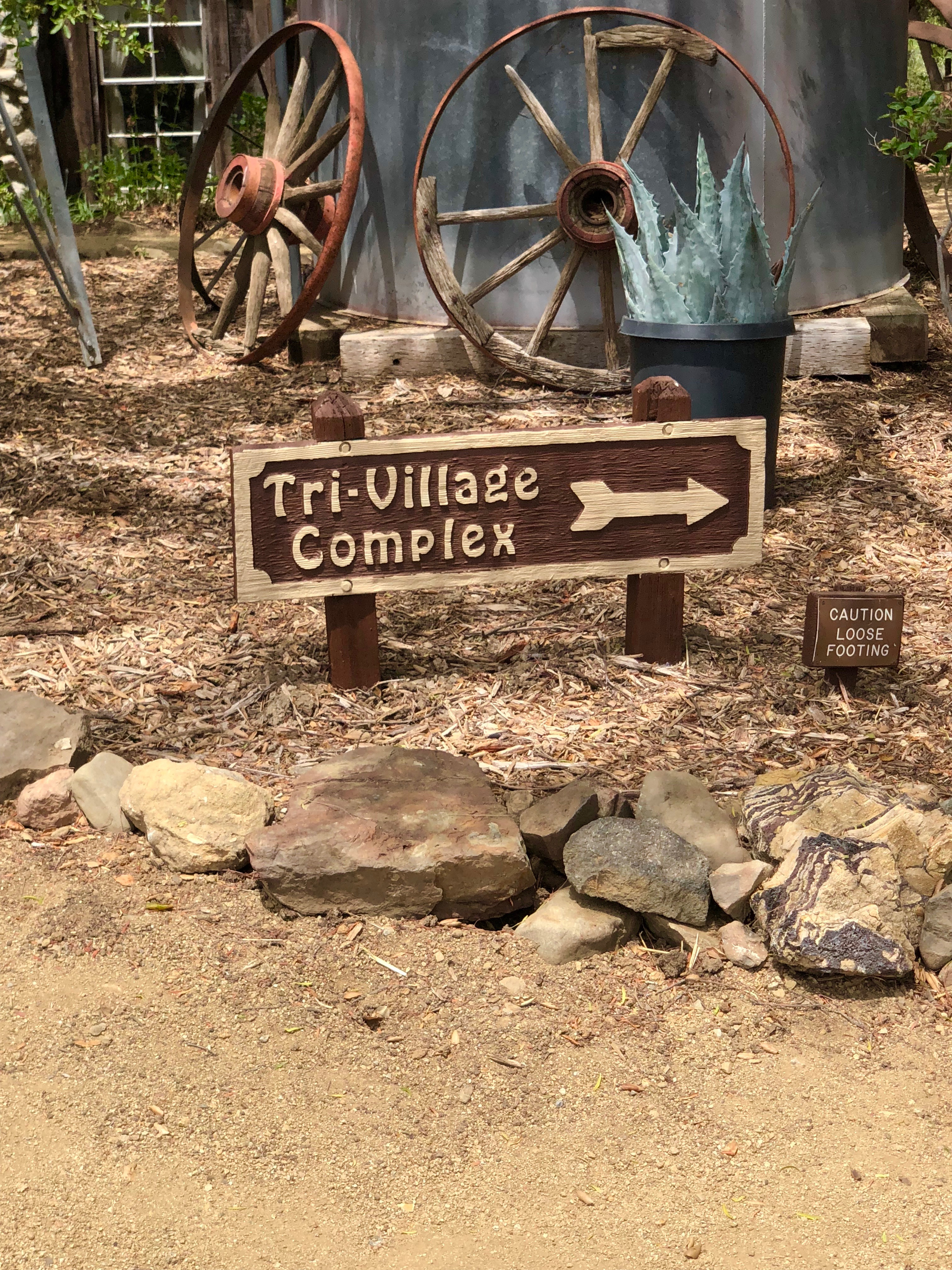
Sign by Nature Trail to the Tri-Village Complex.

The museum is home to permanent exhibits such as the Carriage House, Blacksmith Shop, Anderson Exhibit Hall, Tri-Village and Timber School. The Tri-Village represents three historic eras in the Conejo Valley: the Newbury Pioneer House, a Spanish Adobe and a reconstructed Chumash village. The exhibits are changing routinely. Temporary exhibits as of July 2018 includes Jungleland USA, vintage dresses, and fossils of the Conejo Valley.

Minerals, shells, gramophones, irons, laundry tools and fossils have been on display here. Chumash pictographs have also been on display here.

- Stagecoach Inn Museum: The main part of the museum is the reconstructed 1876 hotel. Items on display relate to local history, American history and the Victorian era. Upstairs are the private family and travelers' wings. Certain rooms function as changing exhibit areas, while other rooms are displayed as they might have looked at the time of the hotel's operation. The Emporium, a gift shop, is also located on the main floor.
- Anderson Exhibit Hall: The lower level of the hotel is accessed from a separate door, and is home to permanent displays of Chumash artifacts as well as items pertaining to the local natural history and archaeology. This exhibit also houses fossils.
- Nature Trails: Two 0.5-mile (0.8 km) paths begin at the bridge behind the Inn and end in the Tri-Village. One path follows a stream in an oak tree forest where various native plants can be seen along the trail. The trails lead to the Tri-Village Complex.
- Tri-Village Complex: The complex features three structures to show various historic periods in which groups inhabited the Conejo Valley. Native Americans are represented by a reconstructed Chumash house, known as an "ap". Mexican vaqueros are represented by an adobe house with a beehive oven. The early American pioneers built wooden houses such as the rebuilt Egbert Starr Newbury house of 1874. Furthermore, the Tri-Village is also home of 250-plus year old Sycamore tree.
- Timber School: Reconstructed 1889 schoolhouse, which originally was located near the corner of Newbury and Kelley Roads.
- Carriage House and Blacksmith Shop: A carriage house, windmill and blacksmith shop are also found on the premises. The Carriage House contains an authentic 19th century stagecoach, tools and farm and broom-making implements. The blacksmith shop operates with antique tools from local ranches.
- Heritage Rose Garden contains over 35 species of heirloom roses dating from 1752. A memorial brick path winds through the garden.

== Stagecoach Inn Museum Park ==
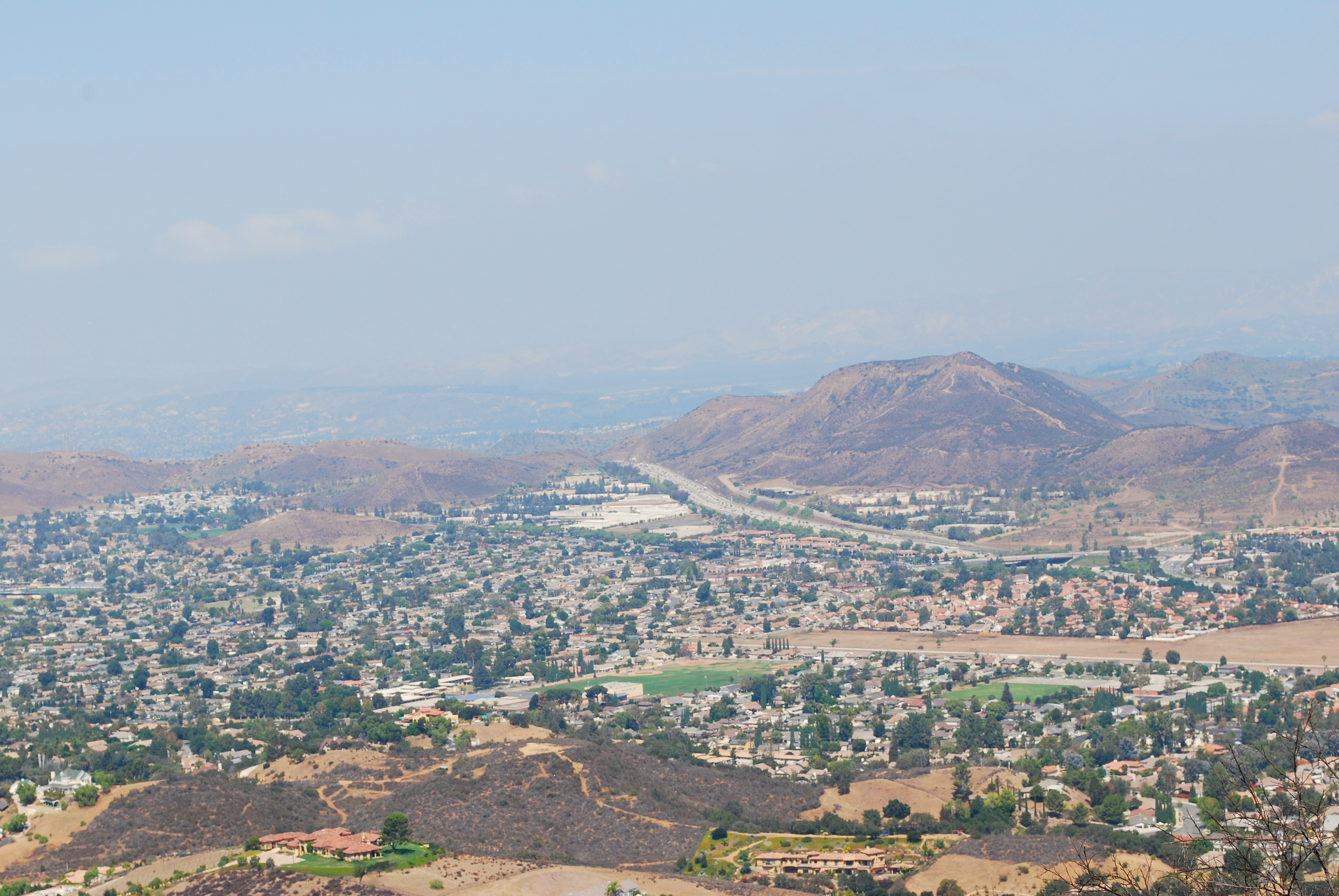
View from Angel Vista, a peak reached from the Rosewood Trail.

Stagecoach Inn Museum Park sits adjacent to the Stagecoach Inn Museum, located at the corner of Lynn and Ventu Park Roads. The park was acquired by the Conejo Recreation & Park District in 1968, and later developed into a neighborhood park in 1985. A creek runs through the park on one edge. The park has a playground, picnic tables, barbecue grills and an outdoor basketball court.

The Rosewood Trail to the 1,603 ft. peak Angel Vista in the Santa Monica Mountains can be reached from the park. Hikers may park at the park and access the Rosewood Trail from its trailhead immediately across Lynn Road from the Stagecoach Inn Museum Park.

== Conejo Valley Historical Society ==
The Conejo Valley Historical Society was established on October 9, 1964, as an effort to save the Stagecoach Inn from potential demolition due to expansion of the Ventura Freeway. Its members were able to save the structure and was also successful in having it declared California State Landmark No. 659. H. Allen Hays, the grandson of Cecil and Cicelie Haigh, donated the building and approximately four acres of land to the Conejo Valley Historical Society. The society deeded the site to the Conejo Recreation and Park District (CRPD) in return for a renewable lease to operate and manage the complex for cultural and educational purposes. The society helped prepare it as a museum after the 1966 move, and the society made immediate plans for rebuilding the structure after the April 1970 fire.

The Conejo Valley Historical Society frequently holds meetings and events at the Stagecoach Inn Museum.

== See also ==
- Reba Hays Jeffries
- List of Registered Historic Places in Ventura County, California
- Ventura County Historic Landmarks & Points of Interest
- History of the National Register of Historic Places
