= Egbert Starr Newbury =

Founder of Newbury Park, California (1843–1880)

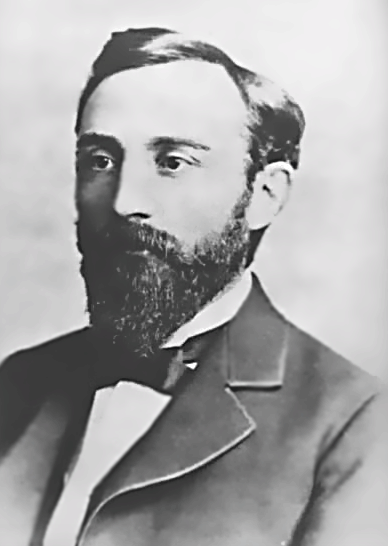
- Born: September 8, 1843; Allegan, Michigan, US
- Died: February 10, 1880 (aged 36); Detroit, Michigan, US
- Spouse: Frances “Fannie” Maria Kellogg Newbury (m. 1873)
- Children: 4

Egbert Starr Newbury (September 8, 1843 – February 10, 1880) was the American founder of Newbury Park, California, and the first newspaper reporter in the Conejo Valley, located in Ventura County. Born and raised in Michigan, he moved to California in 1871 and settled in the Conejo Valley after buying land there in 1874, one of the first three European Americans to do so. He was appointed as the first postmaster in the Conejo Valley, and established the Newbury Park Post Office in 1875 at his house.

He left Newbury Park after an extended drought (1876-1877) caused him to lose his crops and sheep, and go into bankruptcy. He returned with his family to Michigan, settling in Detroit where he found work in a retail store.

The town of Newbury Park and its post office, and Newbury Road were all named for E.S. Newbury. A replica of Newbury's home is located at the Tri-Village at the Stagecoach Inn museum in Newbury Park.

== Early life ==
Egbert Starr Newbury was born on September 8, 1843, in Allegan, Michigan. His father, Samuel Newbury Jr was a reverend in the Presbyterian Church, and his mother, Mary Ann Newbury (née Seegeant) was a descendent of doctors and missionaries. He was the sixth of seven children. and joined the Republican Party as an adult.

On May 11, 1864, Newbury joined the Union Army during the American Civil War and enlisted with a group of volunteers from Dubuque, Iowa. He quickly became a private in the 44th Iowa Infantry Regiment. Newbury's regiment was ordered return to Memphis, Tennessee on September 1, 1864, and then home to Davenport, Iowa on September 15, 1864 where he was discharged from service. After returning home to Dubuque, Newbury began to suffer a persistent cough and his throat became extremely hoarse which allowed him to barely speak above a whisper.

In 1871 Newbury moved to Southern California and its better climate for dealing with his health problems. He first lived in San Jose for two months before heading south to Santa Barbara. Since he was unable to talk, he communicated through notes, hand, signals and facial expressions. In 1872, he traveled to San Francisco to welcome his friend Fannie Kellogg to California. They were old friends from Michigan, and Fannie had recently decided to relocate to the West as well to teach mathematics at Mills College (then just referred to as the Women's College in Oakland). When Fannie arrived, she found that the original teaching position was not available. She went with Newbury to Santa Barbara, where she accepted a teaching position at a local boarding school, filling the place of a teacher who had resigned. She then returned back to San Francisco for her original teaching position where she kept in contact with Newbury.

After Fannie returned back to Santa Barbara, she and Newbury got engaged. They so enjoyed horseback-riding on the beach that Newbury gave Fannie a horse as an engagement present. She named the mare Flora. The couple married on July 9, 1873, in San Francisco. Their honeymoon was a one-week trip by boat, stagecoach and train to Santa Cruz, Pescadero and San Mateo. They sailed by the steamship Orazabo back to Santa Barbara.

== Newbury Park ==
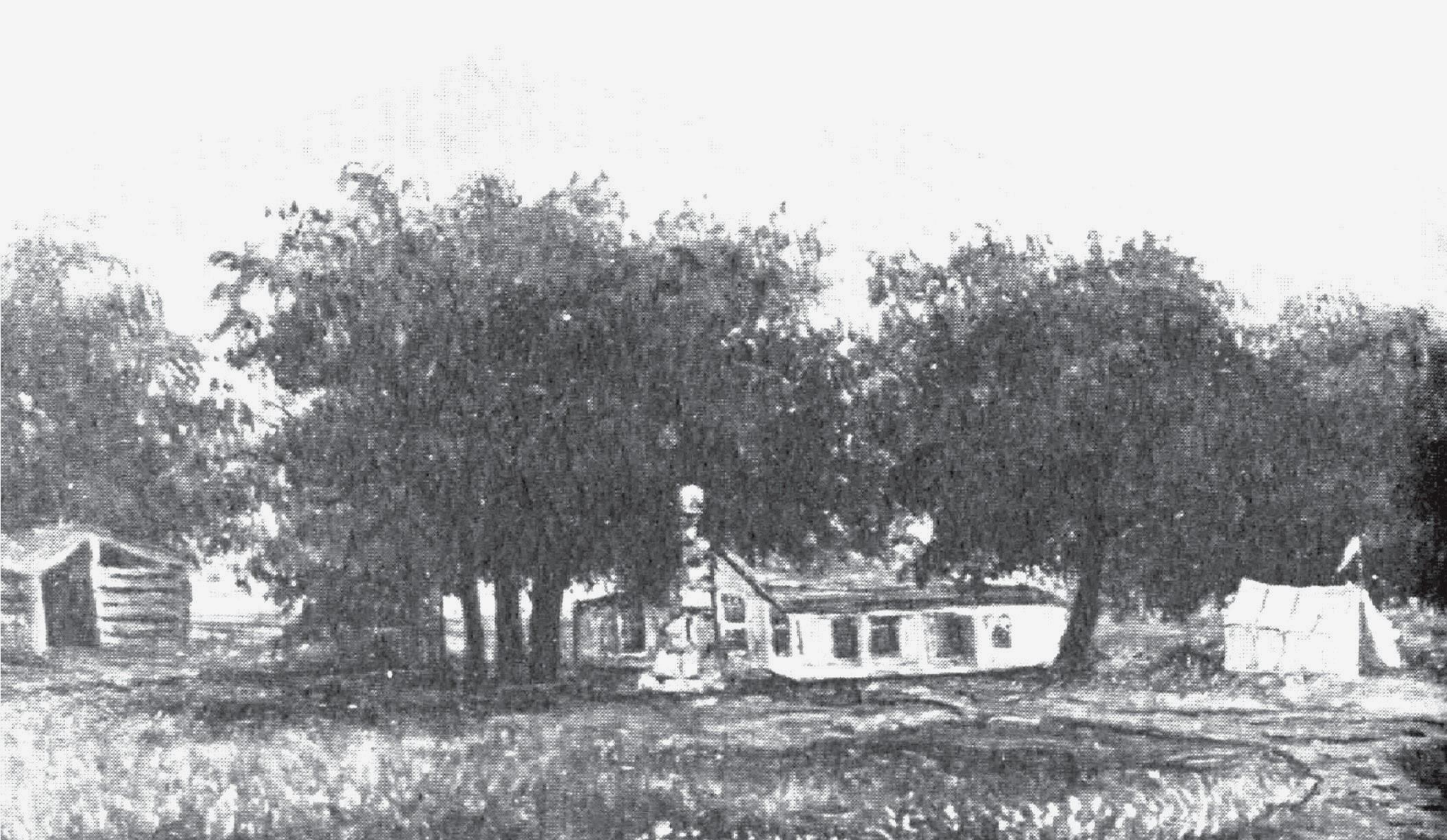
Painting of the Newbury home, 1870s. The tent held Conejo Valley's first post office.

When he bought 2,200 acres in the Conejo Valley in 1874, Newbury was among the first three European Americans to purchase former Rancho El Conejo land established in the Spanish and Mexican eras. He began to develop his property, often traveling for days between the Conejo Valley and Santa Barbara in order to build a wooden cottage in addition to corrals for his planned sheep.

After his wife Frances gave birth to the first of their four children in May 1874, Newbury decided it was time to move to the property in Conejo Valley. He planted acres of wheat, built a barn, and bought 1600 sheep from Winchester Ranch in Santa Barbara. The Conejo Valley was remote and at this time only five European-American families lived here, on large ranch lands miles apart. The valley had no grocery stores, schools, churches, or doctors.

Newbury wrote to his sister in Michigan on November 23, 1874:

...take wings and come to Conejo and enjoy our warm bright days all winter… be outdoors instead of confined indoors… I am out all the time and our drives now are just lovely with the country all turning green. The birds stay around our house in flocks all the time… Our roads to the ranch are splendid and they lie through beautiful canyons and large groves of live and white oak and sycamore, then into an open valley with slopes and surrounding hills covered with evergreen oaks...

As interest increased in the Conejo Valley, Newbury served as its promoter. He also was the correspondent for two Ventura County newspapers, including Ventura Signal. The few valley residents had to travel to San Buenaventura to pick up their mail, so Newbury applied to Washington, D.C., for a new local post office. He named it Newbury Park, as he thought the area looked like a lovely park. The Newbury Park Post Office was the first in Conejo Valley when it opened on July 16, 1875, and Newbury was appointed as US postmaster.

In November 1876, Conejo Valley residents voted in the presidential election between Rutherford B. Hayes and Samuel J. Tilden. Newbury's ranch served as the local post office and polling place; voters filed their ballots at his house.

A severe drought took place between 1876 and 1878, with only six inches of rain in 30 months. Crops failed, and the ranchers lost most of their sheep to starvation. Newbury went bankrupt and had to sell his land at a sheriff's sale. He left in 1877 with his family; they traveled overland to Michigan, where they settled in Detroit. There Newbury worked as a shoe salesmen and tried to pay down his accumulated debt in California.

Newbury contracted pneumonia and died at the age of 36 on February 10, 1880. He is buried in Jackson, Michigan.

== Legacy ==
- Newbury Park and its post office, and Newbury Road were all named after E.S. Newbury.
- A replica of Newbury's home is located at the Tri-Village at the Stagecoach Inn Museum in Newbury Park.
