= Reba Hays Jeffries =

Activist and businesswoman (1920–1989)

Reba Marie Hays Jeffries (June 21, 1920 – August 13, 1989) was one of the founders of Newbury Park Chamber of Commerce and later its first female president. She was a prominent supporter of Newbury Park cityhood and opposed the annexation by neighboring Thousand Oaks. She was also an outspoken supporter of preserving Stagecoach Inn and the Newbury Park Post Office when it was proposed that they be demolished.

Jeffries and her brother H. Allen Hays belonged to a prominent Newbury Park family which helped the town's commercial growth. She gave the successful low bid for a new post office in August 1966, thereby ensuring that the Newbury Park Post Office remained on Newbury Road. Jeffries became a Notary Public and in 1963 the first woman president of the Newbury Park Chamber of Commerce. She owned a variety of local businesses, including Newbury Park Auto Salvage, Newbury Park Lumber Company, Richfield Gas Station, Jeffries Garage, a storage warehouse, trailer park and a used car lot. Her daughter Susan donated fifty boxes of Jeffries' letters, documents and newspaper articles to the Conejo Valley Historical Society.

Haigh Road in Newbury Park is named for her grandparents, Cecil and Cicelie Haigh, the former owners of Conejo Hotel at Timberville.

== Stagecoach Inn ==
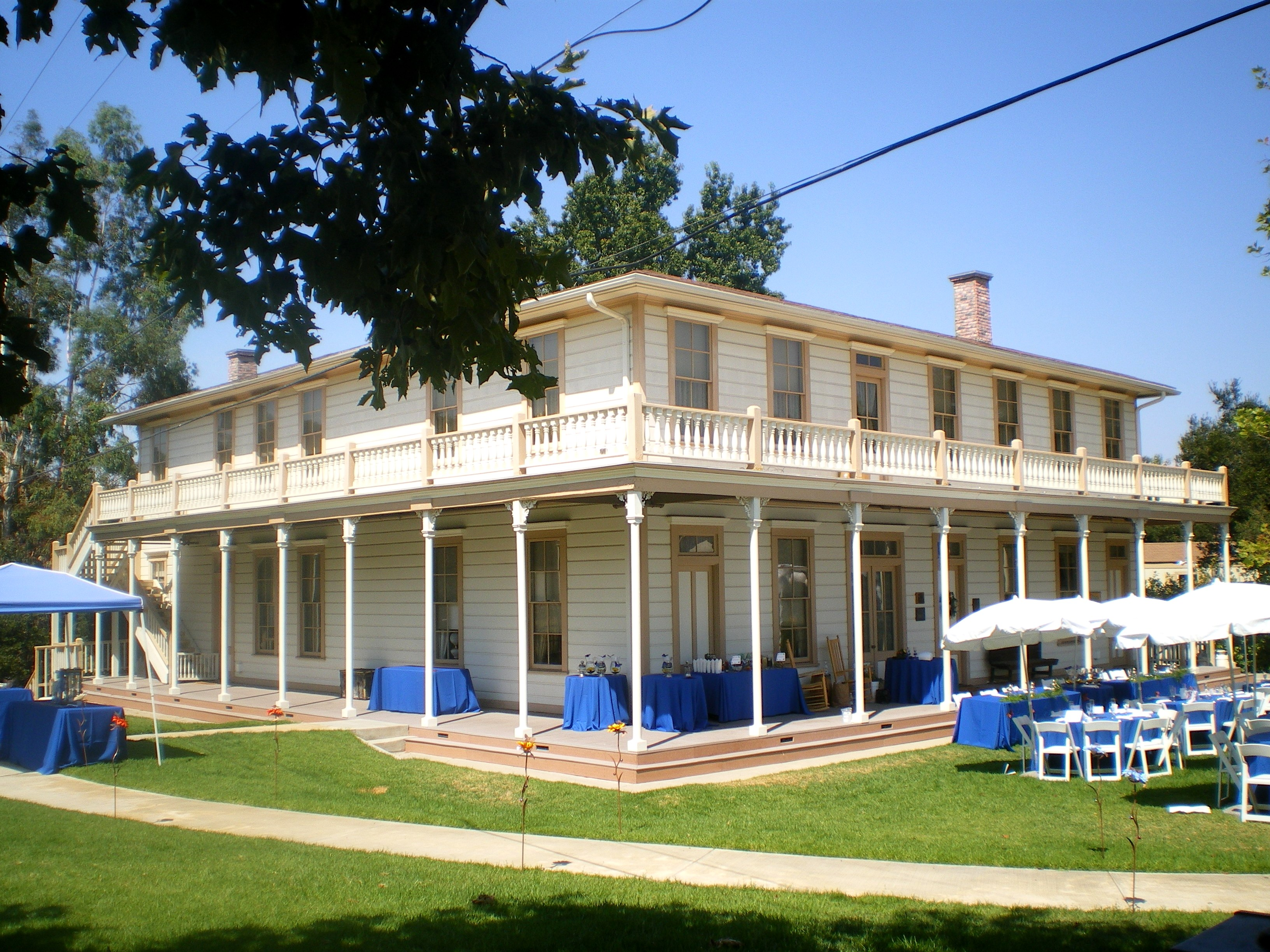
Jeffries helped preserve the 1876 Stagecoach Inn, which is on the National Register of Historic Places.

Jeffries was the granddaughter of Cecil Haigh, who owned Stagecoach Inn (then known as Conejo Hotel at Timberville). Her mother was born at the Stagecoach Inn. The former hotel was a popular stopover for stagecoach travelers riding between Santa Barbara and Los Angeles in the late 19th century.

When Ventura Freeway was to be expanded in 1964, it was proposed that the Stagecoach Inn would be demolished to make room for the new freeway. The Stagecoach Inn had become a Ventura County Historical Landmark in 1957, and was originally constructed in 1876. Jeffries opposed the proposed demolition, and the Jeffries family donated land for the Stagecoach Inn's relocation. Reba Jeffries and her brother, Allen Hays had been given hundreds of acres of land in Newbury Park after their father died and the land was divided between his two children.

== Newbury Park cityhood ==
Newbury Park had numerous attempts at establishing an independent municipality in the 1960s. The 1963 attempt at a cityhood election failed when Janss’ Rancho Conejo Industrial Park and the Talley Corporation refused to join the efforts. Jeffries told interviewers another reason why the cityhood election failed: Cityhood supporters had to collect signatures from owners who represented 29% of the land area in Newbury Park. As the efforts only collected signatures from 29% of registered voters in Newbury Park, the petition never reached the ballot box.

Jeffries was later a prominent opponent of annexation by Thousand Oaks when first proposed in 1967. Jeffries feared for the identity of Newbury Park and was quoted in an interview saying: "It's a shame that the Thousand Oaks personality is overpowering to the extent that Newbury Park is losing its large ranches and freedom."
