= Skylar Peak =

Former Mayor of Malibu

Former City Councilmember & former Mayor of Malibu, California
- In office April 10, 2012 – December 14, 2020

Personal details
- Born: Skylar Peak Los Angeles, California U.S.
- Education: Pepperdine University (BA)

Skylar Peak is an American businessman, politician, environmentalist, professional surf instructor, former Mayor, and former city councilmember of the city of Malibu, California.

== Early life and education ==
Peak is a third-generation resident of Malibu, California where he was born and raised. He attended Pepperdine University. Peak made national headlines in 2008 when he was tried in Los Angeles Superior Court on misdemeanor battery charges after confronting a paparazzo who harassed and photographed actor Matthew McConaughey near Peak's home in Point Dume. Peak was acquitted of all charges when the case ended in a hung jury. Peak stated, "I’ll always fight for the right to privacy." However, later in 2013 he was additionally sent for involuntary psychiatric evaluation for allegedly threatening to harm security officers with a sharp object but was checked out without any further notes five days later.

== Career ==
Upon graduating from Pepperdine University, Peak was trained as an emergency medical technician and worked as a Lifeguard for the Los Angeles County Fire Department at Zuma Beach. Peak owns and operates a family-run electrical construction business, Peak Power Electric, that his father Dusty Peak founded in Malibu in 1978. Mel Gibson’s son Milo Gibson is a buddy and co-worker at Peak Power Electric. Peak is also a professional surf instructor and owns a surf instruction company where he works with celebrities including Gerard Butler for his surfer role in the film “Of Men and Mavericks."

=== Malibu City Council ===
Peak was elected to the Malibu City Council on April 10, 2012, and was re-elected to Malibu City Council on November 8, 2016. Peak was the highest vote-getter in Malibu City Council history and was endorsed by Cindy Crawford, Rande Gerber, Ben Stein, Rob Reiner, and Mike D of the Beastie Boys, who Peak describes as “like family.”

=== Government Service ===
Peak was lauded for his service in leading the community during the 2018 Malibu Woolsey Fire along with then-mayor of Malibu Rick Mullen. He has also been instrumental in creating solutions to solve Malibu's homeless problem.
