= Susan Nelson =

Susan Nelson may refer to:

- Susan Richard Nelson, American lawyer and judge
- Susan B. Nelson, American environmental activist
- Sue Nelson, science writer and broadcaster
- Susan Frances Nelson Ferree, née Nelson, American journalist and social activist
