= Solstice Canyon =

Park in Malibu, California, United States

Coordinates: 34.0391°N 118.7548°W

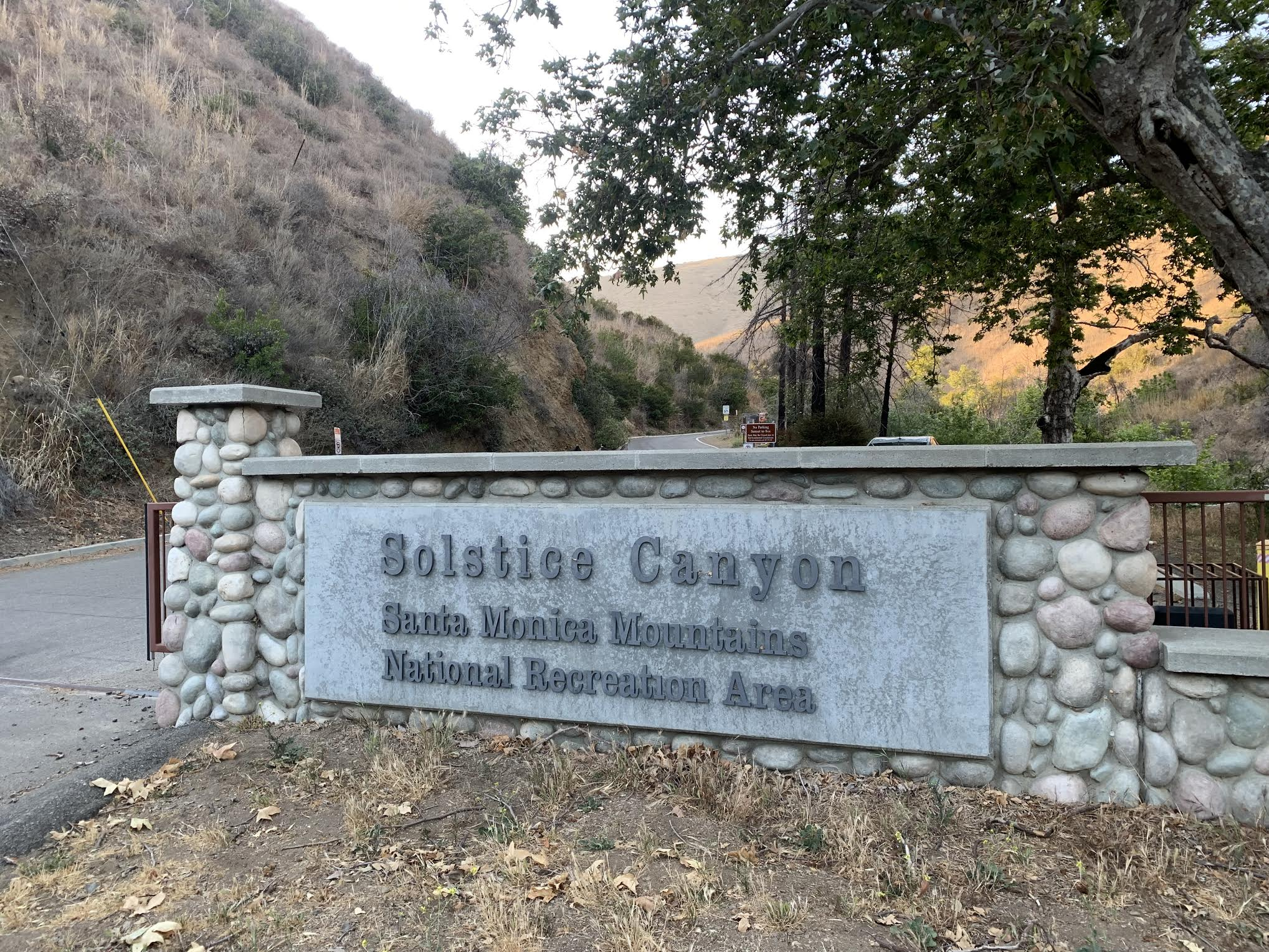
- The entrance to Solstice Canyon as of May 2021.

- Location within California
- Location: Los Angeles County, California, United States
- Nearest city: Malibu, California
- Created: June 20, 1988
- Operator: National Park Service
- Open: 8 AM to Sunset

Solstice Canyon is a park within the Santa Monica Mountains National Recreation Area in Malibu, California. Located off Corral Canyon Road from Pacific Coast Highway, the canyon runs north-to-south about a mile east of Point Dume. Solstice Canyon opened on June 20, 1988 and was created out of land owned by Fred and Florence Roberts. Before becoming a park the land was known as Roberts Ranch from 1932 to 1988.

Roberts Ranch hosted 25 acres to space technology laboratories to conduct research for the Pioneer Series for NASA.

In 2003, during excavation for the parking lot, a Chumash grave site was discovered.

== Notable structures ==
=== Keller ===
Around 1865, Matthew Keller built a stone cottage in the canyon as part of his Rancho Malibu. The structure is believed to be the oldest existing stone building in Malibu. After surviving countless wildfires, the structure was finally left in ruins by the 2007 Corral Canyon Fire.

=== Swinney ===
Cordelia and Henry Swinney built a wooden cabin in the 1880s inside the Malibu land grant. Swinney was told that he was on the wrong side of the boundary line, so he disassembled the cabin and moved it a few hundred feet north, across the Rancho Boundary. That is where Keller's stone house was built to replace the old wooden cabin. The stone house is still there today, and it marks the spot where Swinney moved his cabin to (just outside the property line).

=== Roberts ===
Florence B. (née Sullivan, 1904–1992) and Frederick L. Roberts (1899–1976) founders of Roberts Public Markets chain based in Santa Monica and owners of Roberts Ranch which was over 1,000 acres. They decided to replace their rustic home in Solstice Canyon featured in The Los Angeles Times Home Magazine in 1947. The Roberts hired renowned architect Paul Williams in 1950 to design a sprawling California ranch house later featured in Architectural Digest. The family moved in 1952, interiors being designed by prominent firm Cannell and Chaffin of Westwood.

Their home was ravaged by wildfire in 1982, after Fred Roberts had died. This event precipitated the sale of Roberts Ranch to the State of California and the Trust for Public Land. In 1996, the land was transferred to the National Park Service to be a part of the Santa Monica Mountains National Recreation Area. The Roberts home ruins along with the waterfall have become a popular hiking destination since the park opened.
