= Formula Five =

BBC Radio 5 science magazine programme

Formula Five was a British science magazine programme on BBC Radio 5 aimed at listeners in their late teens. It ran from 1990 to 1994, when the network closed.

Sue Nelson presented the programme for most of its time on air, with Jez Nelson co-presenting the final series. Quentin Cooper was a regular contributor.

As well as science, the series featured a running serial of Captain Scarlet, using soundtracks from the television series of the same name.
