= Arroyo Sequit =

Watercourse near Malibu, California

- Interactive map of Arroyo Sequit
- Coordinates: 34°05′4″N 118°53′12″W
- Governing body: National Park Service

Arroyo Sequit is a waterway that runs for about three miles in Ventura County and Los Angeles County in California, United States. Ventura and Los Angeles counties and drains into the Pacific Ocean. The Arroyo Sequit East Fork rises in Los Angeles County, 2 miles (3.2 km) southeast of Triunfo Pass and flows in general southwestward. The West Fork rises in Triunfo Pass two miles above the confluence and flows east of south. Below the forks the course of the creek is west of south to the point at which it enters the Pacific.

Arroyo Sequit Park is a unit within the Santa Monica Mountains National Recreation Area, located at 34138 Mulholland Highway, inland from Malibu in southeastern Ventura County, California. The park is in the Santa Monica Mountains, and is managed by the National Park Service. The preserve includes a looping nature trail. As of July 2023 Arroyo Sequit is closed to the public with no specified re-opening date.

== See also ==
- Flora of the Santa Monica Mountains
- God's Seat
- Mulholland Highway
- Rancho Topanga Malibu Sequit
