= God's Seat =

Geological landmark in Malibu, California

Coordinates: 34.110138°N 118.906635°W

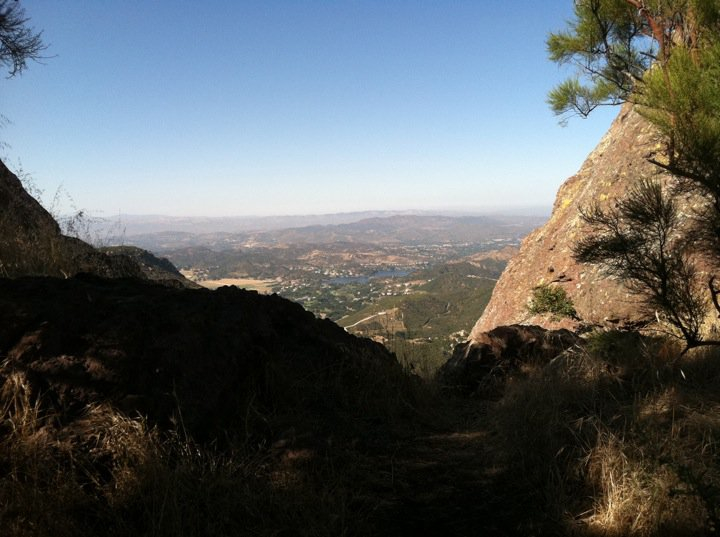
The view from within God's Seat, looking northward over Lake Sherwood.

God's Seat is a popular vista and rock formation in Malibu, California, United States, about two miles east of Circle X Ranch in the Santa Monica Mountains National Recreation Area. God's Seat's name derives from its natural throne-like shape at the top of a thousand-foot cliff. It is well known locally for its scenic views of Lake Sherwood, Sandstone Peak, the Conejo Valley and the Pacific Ocean.

The formation is visible from Yerba Buena Road, about two miles north of Mulholland Highway along the Backbone Trail. The California Hells Angels were supposedly once common fixtures at the site, which they nicknamed Smoker's Perch. The "seat of the throne" today is a floor of broken glass, though the site is now patrolled daily so as to prevent further vandalism.

== See also ==
- Santa Monica Mountains
- Santa Monica Mountains National Recreation Area
- Mulholland Highway
- Sandstone Peak
