= Santa Monica Mountains National Recreation Area =

Protected area in Southern California, US

- IUCN category V (protected landscape/seascape)
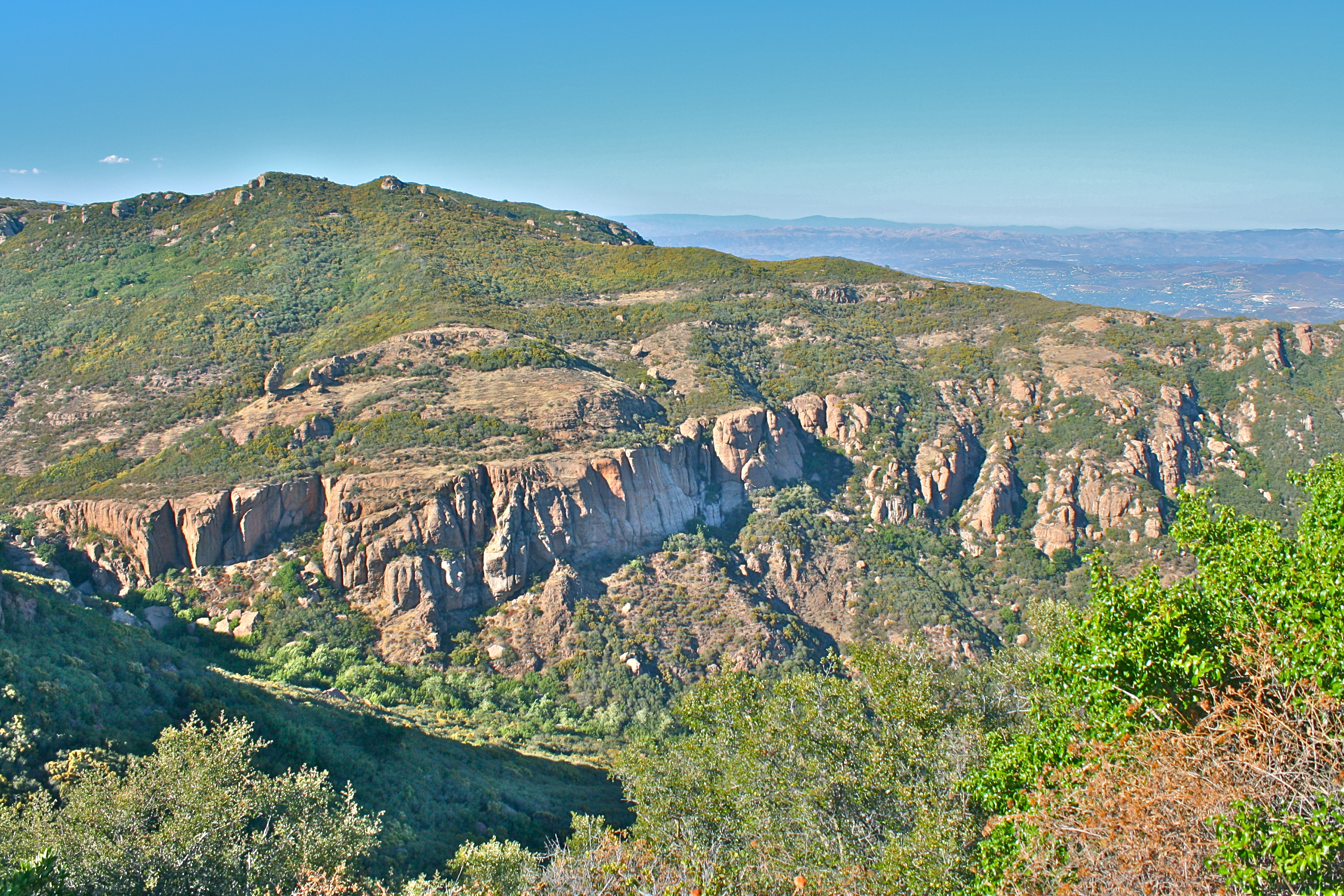
- Backbone Trail near Mishe Mokwa Trail in the SMMNRA

- Location within California Location within the United States
- Interactive map of Santa Monica Mountains National Recreation Area
- Location: Santa Monica Mountains; Los Angeles and Ventura Counties, California, U.S.
- Nearest city: Malibu, California; Newbury Park, California
- Coordinates: 34°06′14″N 118°36′09″W
- Area: 157,700 acres (638 km^{2})
- Established: November 10, 1978
- Visitors: 795,217 (in 2022)
- Governing body: National Park Service; with State and local agencies.
- Website: Santa Monica Mountains National Recreation Area

The Santa Monica Mountains National Recreation Area (SMMNRA) is a national recreation area containing many individual parks and open space preserves, located primarily in Southern California's Santa Monica Mountains. Located in greater Los Angeles, two thirds of SMMNRA's parklands are in northwest Los Angeles County and the remaining third, including a Simi Hills extension, is in southeastern Ventura County. It is administered by the National Park Service in coordination with state, county, municipal, and university agencies.

In size, the Santa Monica Mountains National Recreation Area is the largest urban national park in the world. It is also one of the best examples of a Mediterranean climate ecosystem and it protects one of the highest densities of archaeological resources in any mountain range in the world.

== Geography ==
The Santa Monica Mountains NRA contains 153,075 acres (61,947 ha) in the Transverse Ranges' Santa Monica Mountains, with its southeastern slopes part of the Los Angeles River headwaters. The California State Park system and other public agencies own 49,756 acres (20,136 ha), the National Park Service own 25,117 acres (10,164 ha), and the rest of the SMMNRA lands are owned by local agencies, university reserves, and private property conservation easements.

== Park history ==
=== National Forest proposal ===
During the first decade of the twentieth century, Frederick H. Rindge attempted to create a forest reserve (precursors to national forests) in the Santa Monica Mountains several times. In 1902, California's State Mining Bureau also attempted to establish a forest reserve, but their proposal was denied.

In 1907, a proposal requesting at least 70,000 acres (28,000 ha) in the Santa Monica Mountains be designated a forest reserve was submitted to the Secretary of the Interior, but state mineralogist Lewis E. Aubury opposed the venture. The U. S. Forest Service then advised Aubury that it was highly improbable a forest reserve would be created owing to local opposition and the small amount of public land still remaining in the mountains.

=== National Park proposals ===
In 1925, limestone deposits were discovered in the mountains behind Pacific Palisades, which led to a lengthy battle between home owners and land developers. Alphonzo Bell Sr. led the push for development, while local opposition was led by Sylvia Morrison. After much criticism of Bell's original plan, Bell submitted an updated plan that saw the limestone pulverized, mixed with water, and pumped via a buried pipeline to the mouth of Santa Ynez Canyon, where it would continue along the ocean floor to an offshore buoy. Will Rogers parodied the plan on the front page of the Los Angeles Times, after which William Mulholland came to Bell's defense. Around the same time, Morrison urged to establish the Santa Monica Mountains as Whitestone National Park, named after the limestone cliffs.

In 1930, lifelong national park advocate Frederick Law Olmsted Jr. proposed a network of parks, beaches, playgrounds, and forests to promote social, economic, and environmental vitality in Los Angeles, and he also advocated for public ownership of at least 10,000 acres (4,000 ha) of beach and mountain between Topanga and Point Dume. His report, however, was not successful.

In 1938, May Rindge (widow of Frederick H. Rindge) lost control of her Santa Monica Mountain lands and was forced into bankruptcy. She proposed to establish a park in exchange for the cancellation of $1.1 million ($25.2 million in 2025) in unpaid taxes, but the county refused her offer.

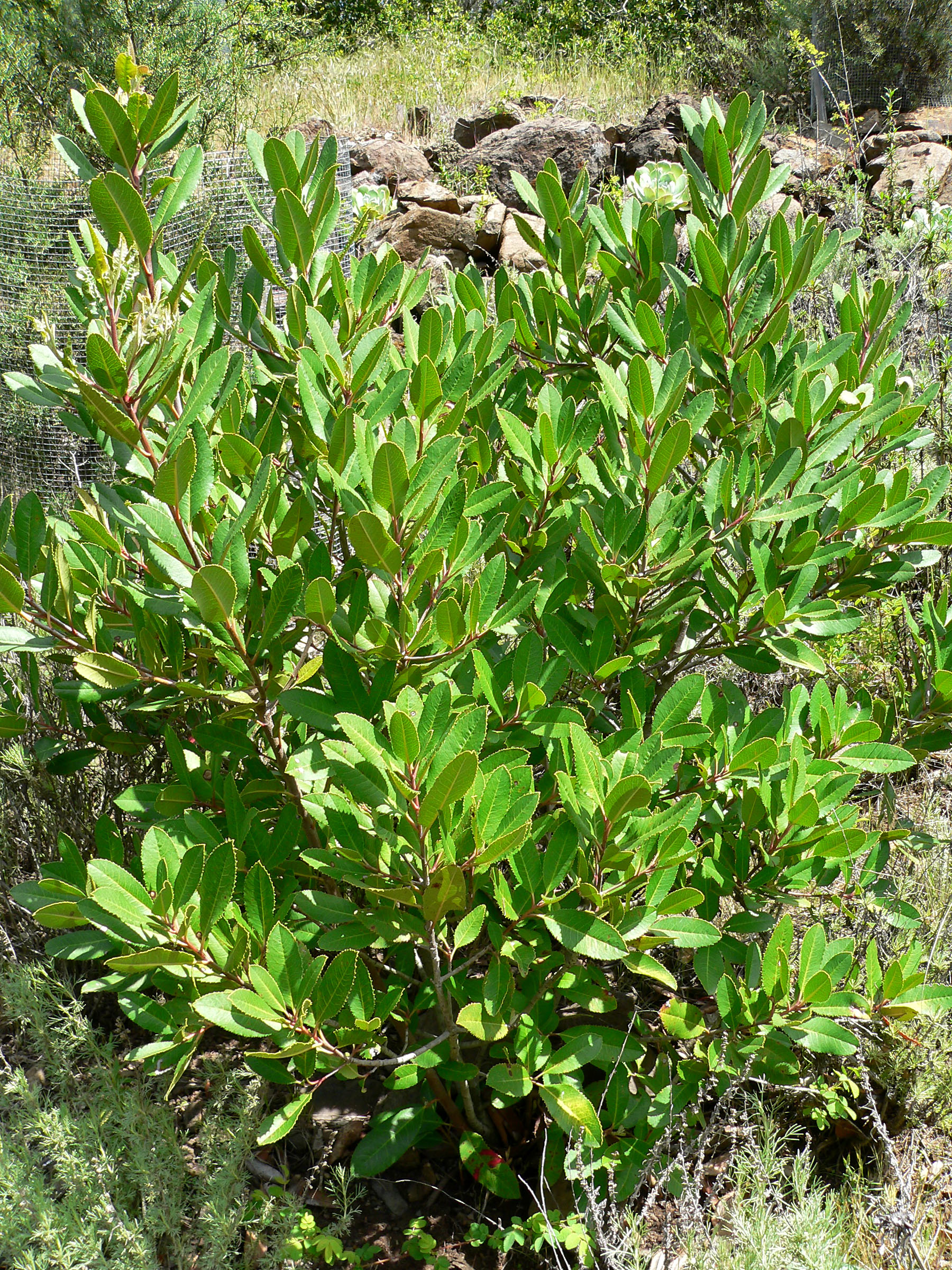
The toyon species that Toyon National Park would have been named after

In the 1960s and 70s, possibly even as early of the 1950s, several proposals designating the Santa Monica Mountains as Toyon National Park went before U.S. Congress, and in 1971, Representative Alphonzo Bell Jr. introduced the first a bill to create Toyon National Park.

=== State parks ===
In 1944, Will Rogers State Historic Park was created, marking the first state park in the Santa Monica Mountains and the first public land in the mountains since Griffith Park in 1896.

In 1967, the State Division of Beaches and Parks acquired 6,700 acres (2,700 ha) of the Broome Ranch (originally part of Rancho Guadalasca) for $15.1 million ($146 million in 2025), which they used to establish Point Mugu State Park. In 1972, the park system purchased 5,800 neighboring acres (2,300 ha) for $2.1 million ($16.2 million in 2025), nearly doubling the park's size. In 1980, a remaining 850-acre parcel (340 ha) that adjoined the property was purchased, becoming Rancho Sierra Vista open space park.

In 1974, the 11,525 acres (4,664 ha) Topanga State Park (originally Topanga Canyon State Park) was opened to the public. The park encompass large areas outside Topanga Canyon, from Pacific Coast Highway to Mulholland Drive. Also in 1974, the State of California purchased the 2,700-acre (1,100 ha) Century Ranch including a 120-acre property formerly owned by Ronald Reagan for $4.8 million ($31.3 million in 2025). In 1975, Bob Hope's Century Ranch-abutting Hope Ranch was purchased for $4.1 million ($24.5 million in 2025), and in 1976, the State Parks and Recreation Commission officially named the Century, Reagan, and Hope Ranch lands Malibu Creek State Park.

=== Establishment of the National Recreation Area ===
In 1964, Susan B. Nelson, later known as the mother of the Santa Monica Mountain National Recreation Area, helped organize Friends of the Santa Monica Mountains, Parks and Seashore. The SMMNRA was established on November 10, 1978, with a strategy of growing the park through "mosaic pieces" that would link critical habitats, save unique areas, and expand the existing park.

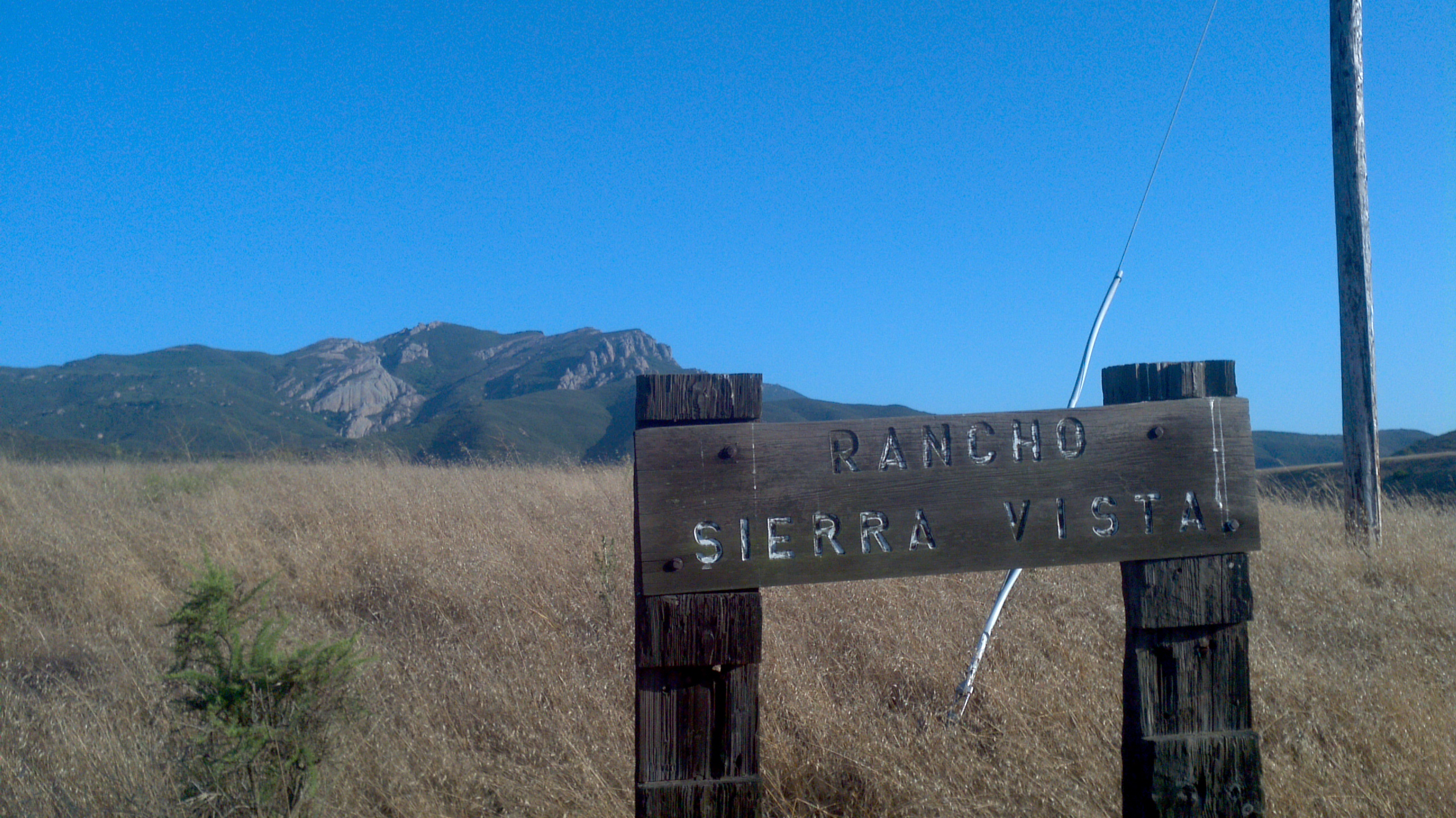
Rancho Sierra Vista in the SMMNRA

In the 1980s, the Santa Monica Mountains Conservancy was created to acquire and preserve land for open spaces, habitat preserves, and public recreation. One of their first acquisitions was Rancho Sierra Vista in 1980, and Paramount Ranch was also acquired that year.

In the early 1990s, Bob Hope created controversy when he proposed selling 5,900 acres (2,400 ha) of land in the Corral Canyon area to the government in exchange for 59 acres (24 ha) in the nearby Cheeseboro Canyon section of the SMMNRA, land he planned to use for access road to a new golf course and housing development. The land swap was never completed, with the Jordan Ranch becoming the Palo Commado section of the Cheeseboro Canyon/Palo Comado Canyon Open Space parks and most of the land for the 1,000 acres (400 ha) Corral Canyon Park later donated by Hope.

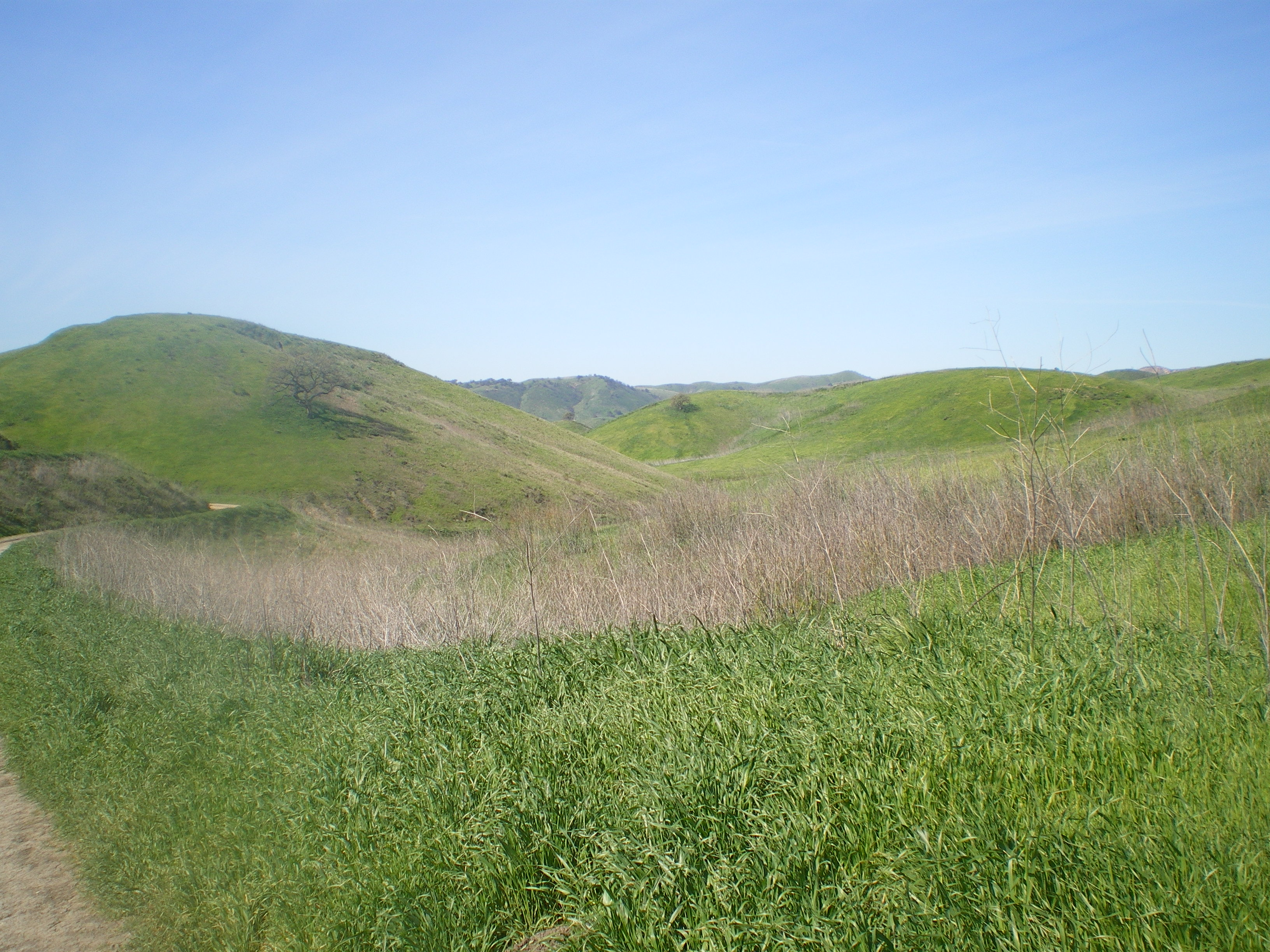
Rolling hills at Upper Las Virgenes Canyon Open Space Preserve

In 2003, Ahmanson Ranch was acquired by the Santa Monica Mountains Conservancy to create the 2,983 acres (1,207 ha) Upper Las Virgenes Canyon Open Space Preserve. In 2010, 200 acres (81 ha) of land northwest of the U.S. 101/Las Virgenes Road junction, as well as additional land to the southeast of Las Virgenes Road, were acquired by the Santa Monica Mountain Conservancy. Additionally, several hills with undeveloped ranch land in the area also had their viewsheds protected from development, and these areas now serve as an unofficial gateway to the SMMNRA and its visitor center on Las Virgenes Road at King Gillette Ranch.

In 2018, the Woolsey Fire burned 88% of the federal parkland and more than 40% of the natural area in the Santa Monica Mountains.

==== Park superintendents ====
- Robert Chandler, 1979–1982
- Daniel Kuehn, 1983–1988
- William Webb (Acting Superintendent), 1988–1989
- David Gackenbach, 1989–1995
- Arthur Eck, 1995–2002
- Woody Smeck, 2002–2012
- David Szymanski, 2012–2024
- Jody Lyle, 2024–present

== Studies ==
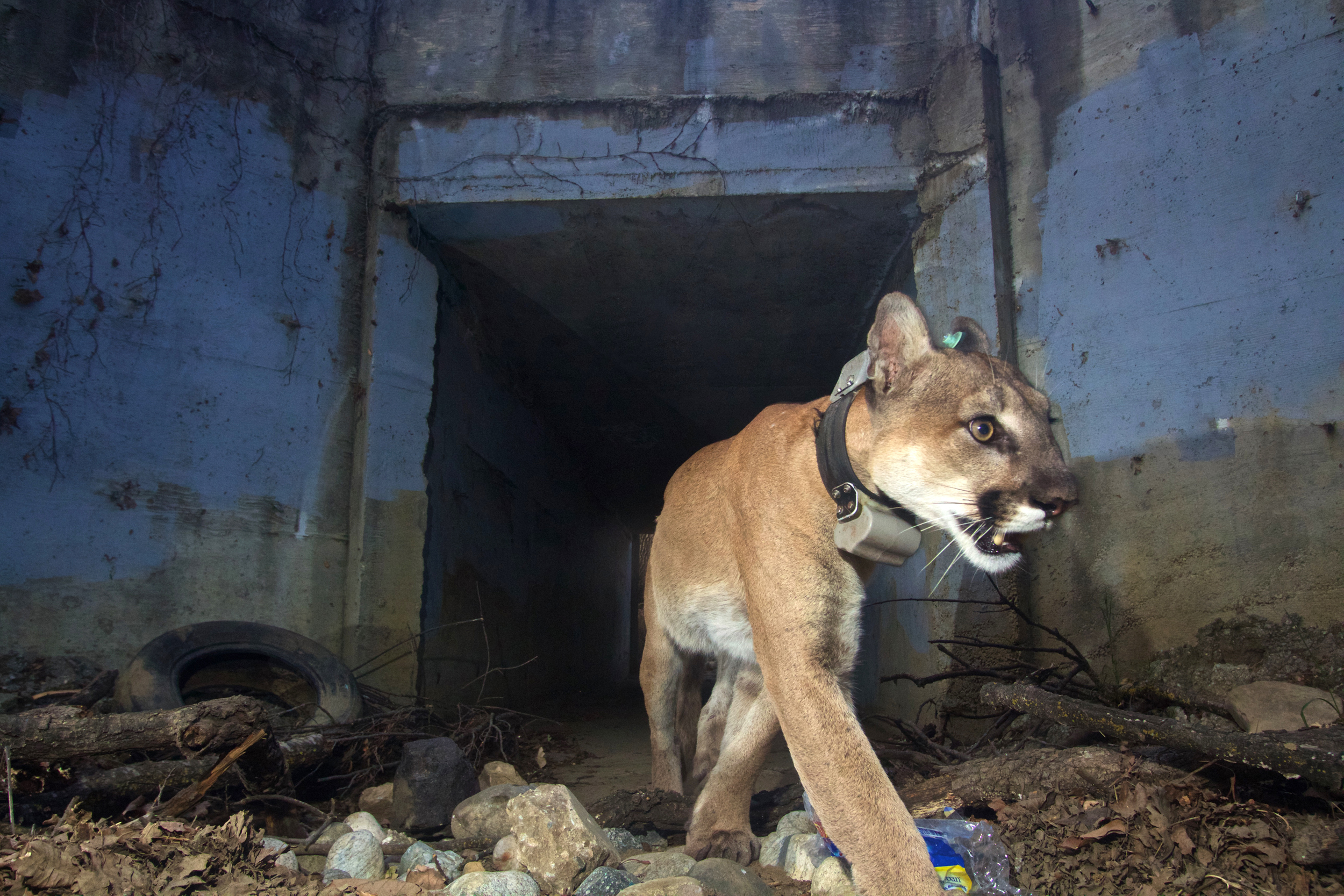
P-64, a mountain lion who frequently visited the SMMNRA

In order to understand the effects of U.S. 101 on Santa Monica Mountains wildlife survival, movement, and genetic diversity, the National Park Service began tracking bobcats in the area in 1996, mountain lions in 2002, and black bears in 2019. The Wallis Annenberg Wildlife Crossing, a vegetated overpass spanning U.S. 101 at Liberty Canyon, is meant to alleviate some of the negative effects discovered by the study.

The National Park Service's Rim of the Valley Corridor Special Resource Study, which entails connecting the Santa Monica Mountains and parklands surrounding the San Fernando, Crescenta, Santa Clarita, Simi, and Conejo valleys is also currently under study. This study could involve adding up to 313,000 acres (127,000 ha) to the SMMNRA.

== Cultural resources ==
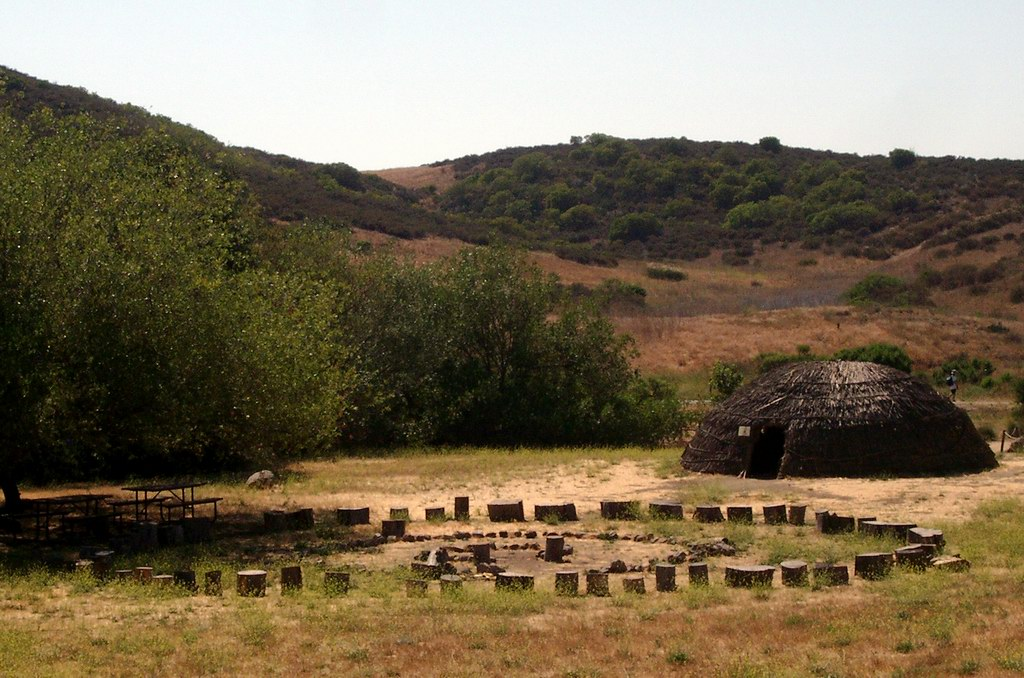
Satwiwa, one of SMMNRA's many historic sites

The Santa Monica Mountains have been occupied by humans for more than 10,000 years and contain many prehistoric and historic sites. More than 1,000 archaeological sites are in the Santa Monica Mountains National Recreation Area, making it one of the highest densities of archaeological resources in any mountain range in the world.

At least 73 archeological sites, structures, cultural landscapes, and cultural properties in the SMMNRA are eligible for listing on the National Register of Historic Places. The SMMNRA also contains 26 known Chumash pictograph sites and a number of California Historical Landmarks lie within the area, including the site of the Port of Los Angeles Long Wharf (#881), Point Dume (#965), and Adamson House (#966). Also within the SMMNRA is Paramount Ranch, however, the Woolsey Fire severely damaged the ranch in 2018.

Santa Monica Mountains Fund (SAMO Fund) works to encourage appreciation and understanding of the Santa Monica Mountains National Recreation Area (SMMNRA) by supporting its National Park Service and California State Parks programs. The SMMNRA encompasses homelands of indigenous people including the Chumash people in the western portion and the Tongva people in the eastern end.

== Facilities ==
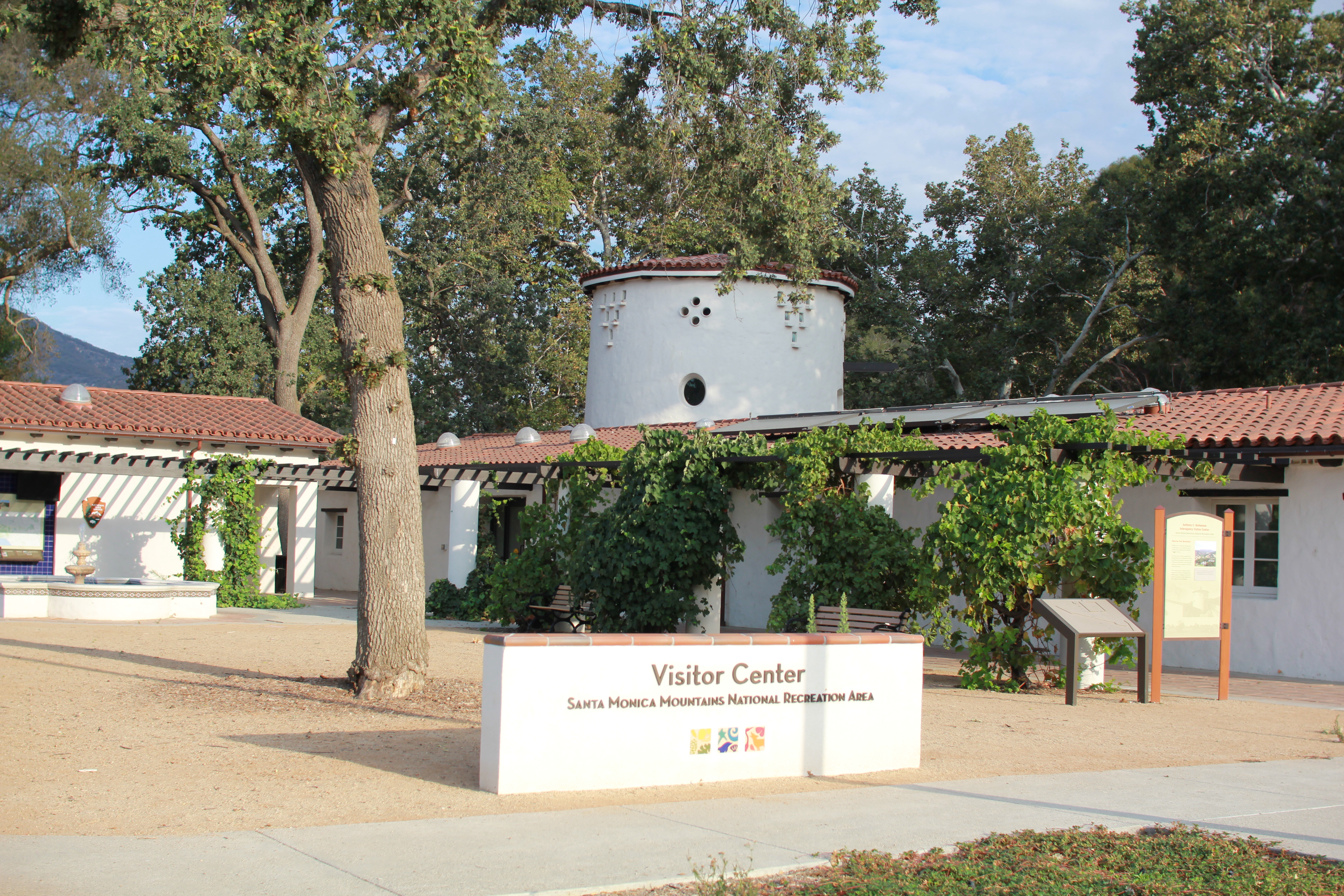
Santa Monica Mountains Interagency Visitor Center

The Anthony C. Beilenson Interagency Visitor Center opened in June 2012 and is operated by four partner agencies: National Park Service, California State Parks, Santa Monica Conservancy, and Mountains Recreation and Conservation Authority. The Satwiwa Native American Indian Culture Center is the only site in the SMMNRA dedicated to Indian cultures. Park headquarters are located offsite in Thousand Oaks.

Main entrances to the SMMNRA are located in Malibu, Newbury Park, Agoura Hills, Calabasas, Woodland Hills, and Topanga.

=== Parks within ===
==== State parks ====
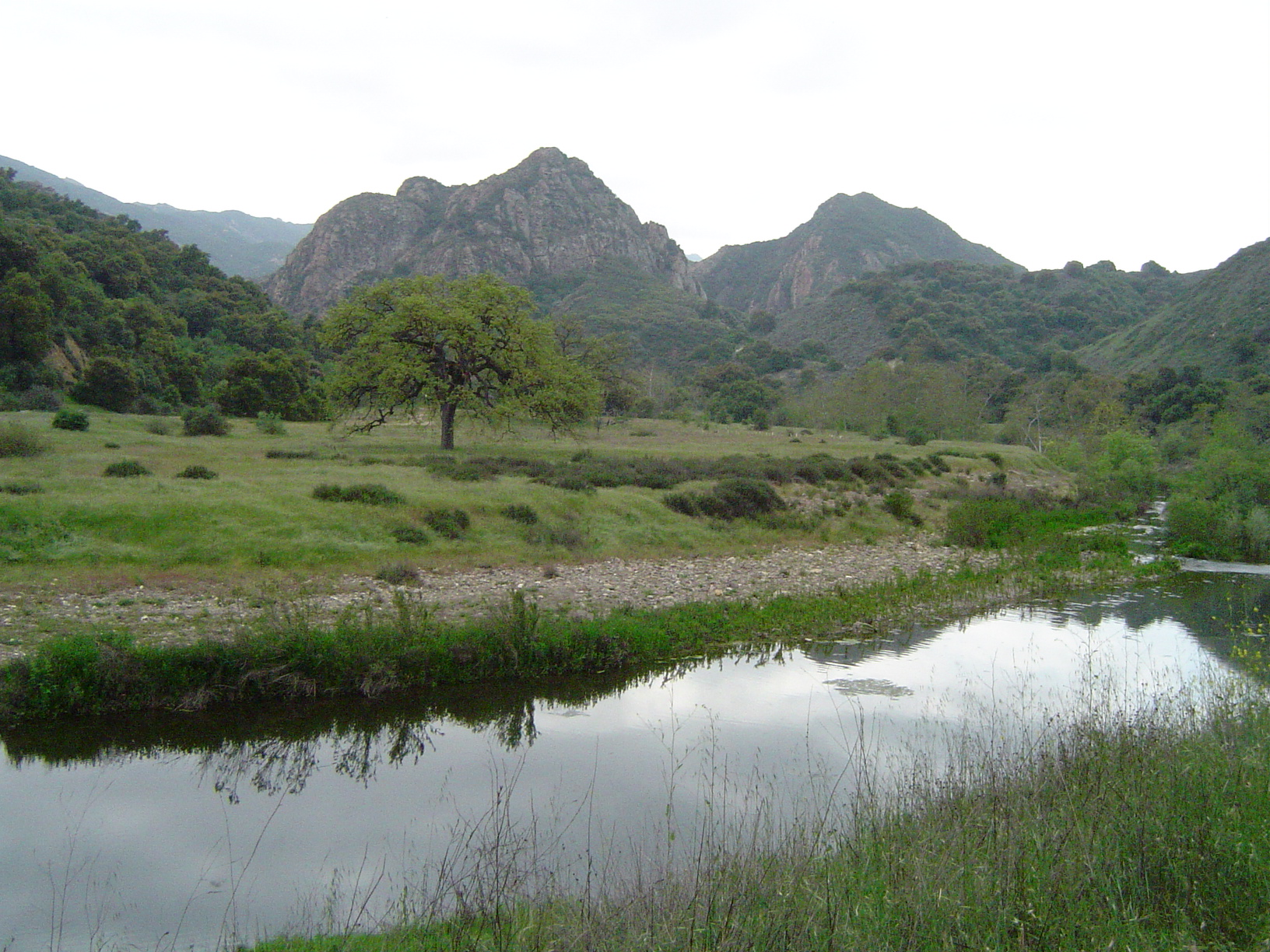
Malibu Creek State Park

- Topanga
- Leo Carrillo
- Malibu Creek
- Point Mugu
- Will Rogers

==== Beaches ====
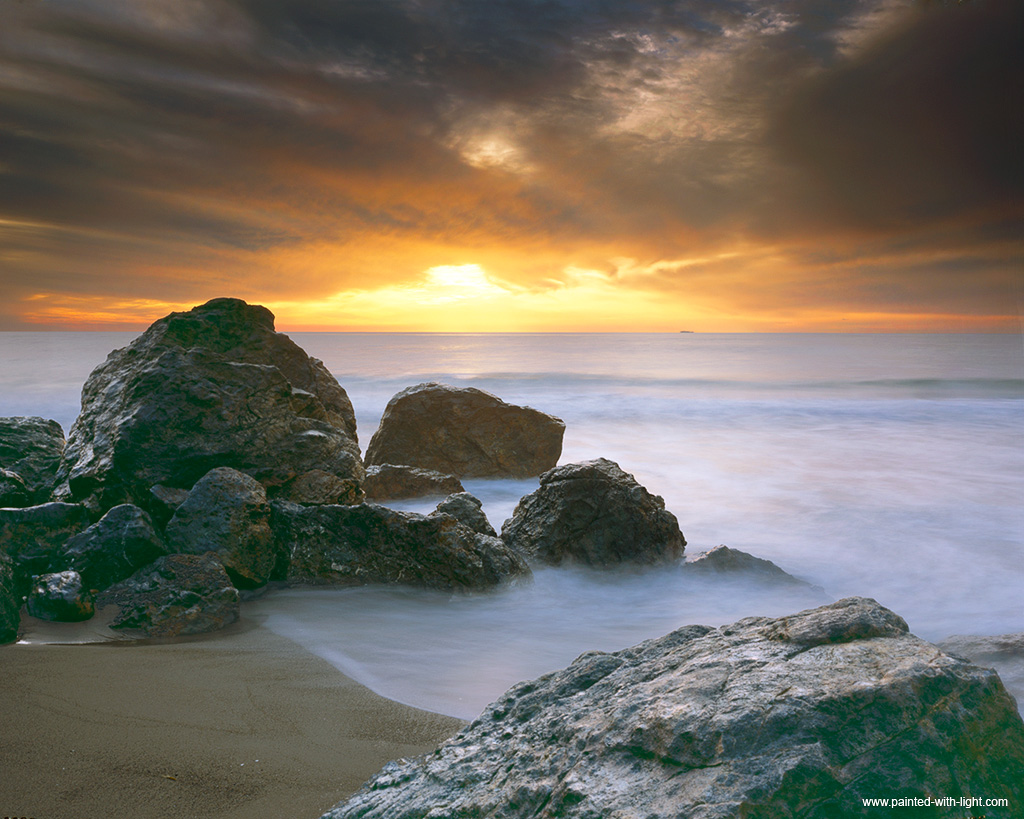
Westward Beach at Point Dume

- Carbon
- County Line
- Robert H. Meyer (El Matador, El Pescador, and La Piedra)
- Las Tunas
- Malibu Lagoon
- Point Dume
- Santa Monica
- Topanga
- Thornhill Broome
- Will Rogers
- Zuma

==== Other ====
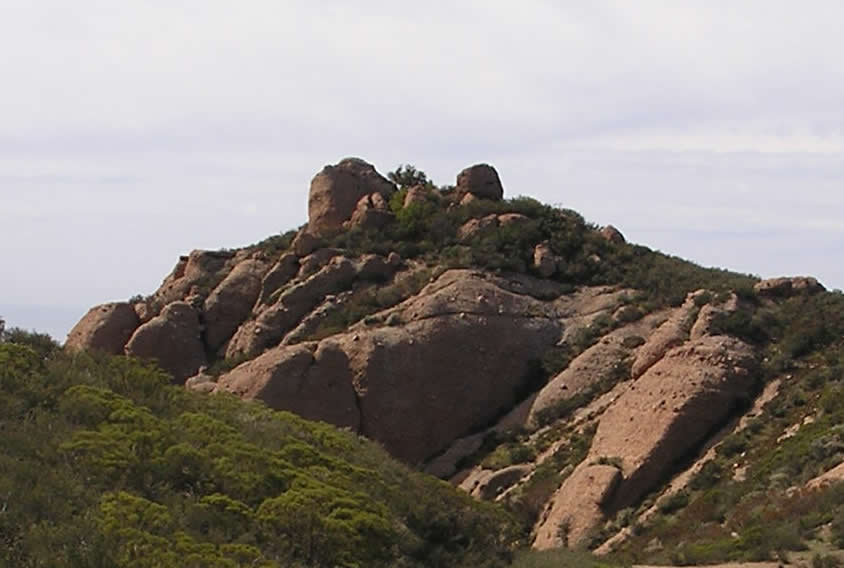
Boney Peak in Circle X Ranch

- Arroyo Sequit
- Backbone Trail System
- Circle X Ranch
- Corral Canyon
- Franklin Canyon

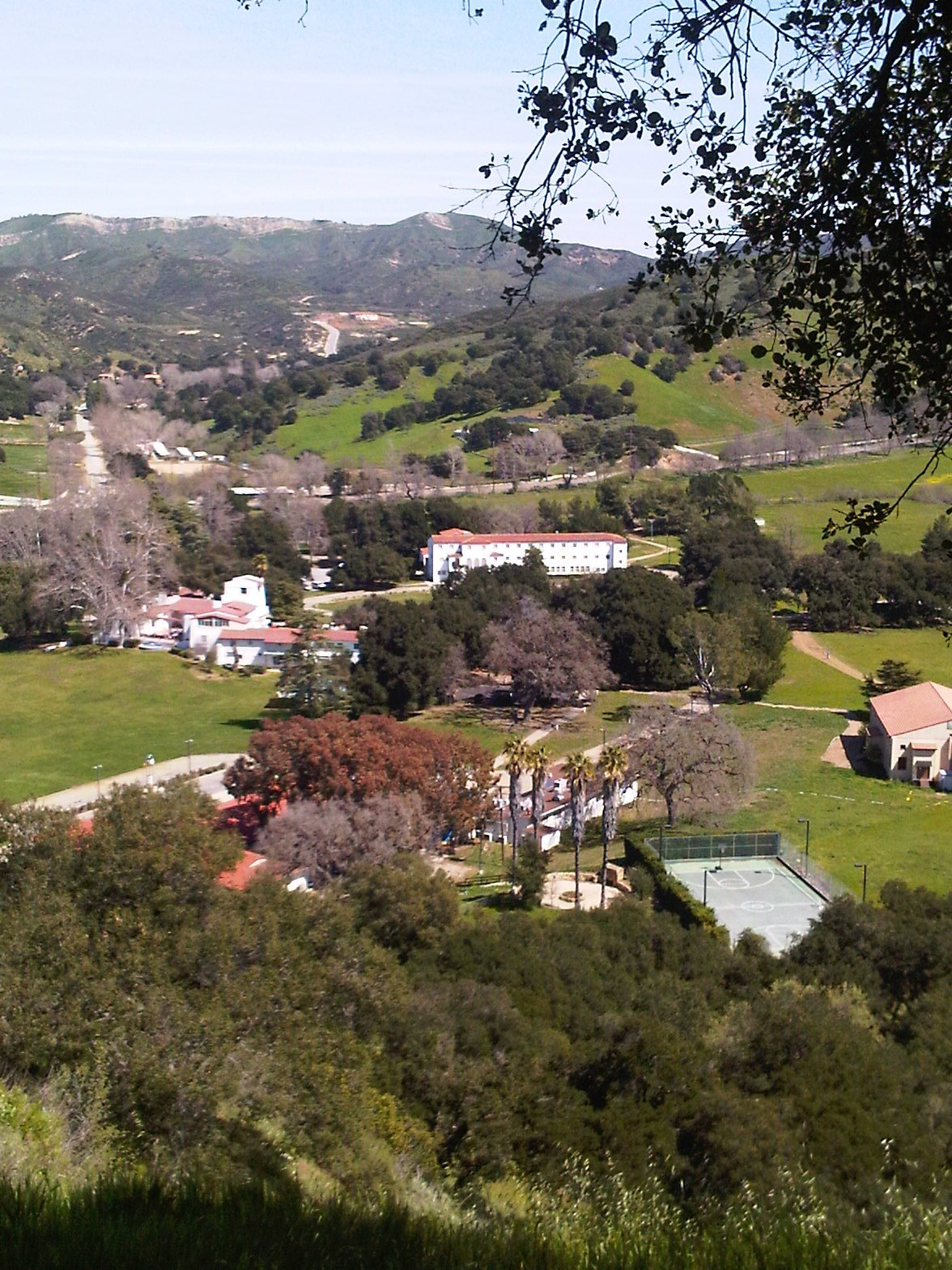
King Gillette Ranch

- King Gillette Ranch
- Marvin Braude
- Morrison Ranch
- Paramount Ranch
- Peter Strauss Ranch
- Rancho Sierra Vista
- Rocky Oaks
- Runyon Canyon
- Solstice Canyon
- Upper Las Virgenes Canyon Open Space Preserve
- Zuma and Trancas Canyons

== See also ==
- Mountain lions in the Santa Monica Mountains
- Flora of the Santa Monica Mountains
