= Rocky Oaks =

Park in California, United States

- Location: Mulholland Highway, Santa Monica Mountains, Los Angeles County, California
- Coordinates: 34°05′52″N 118°48′54″W
- Governing body: Santa Monica Mountains National Recreation Area, National Park Service

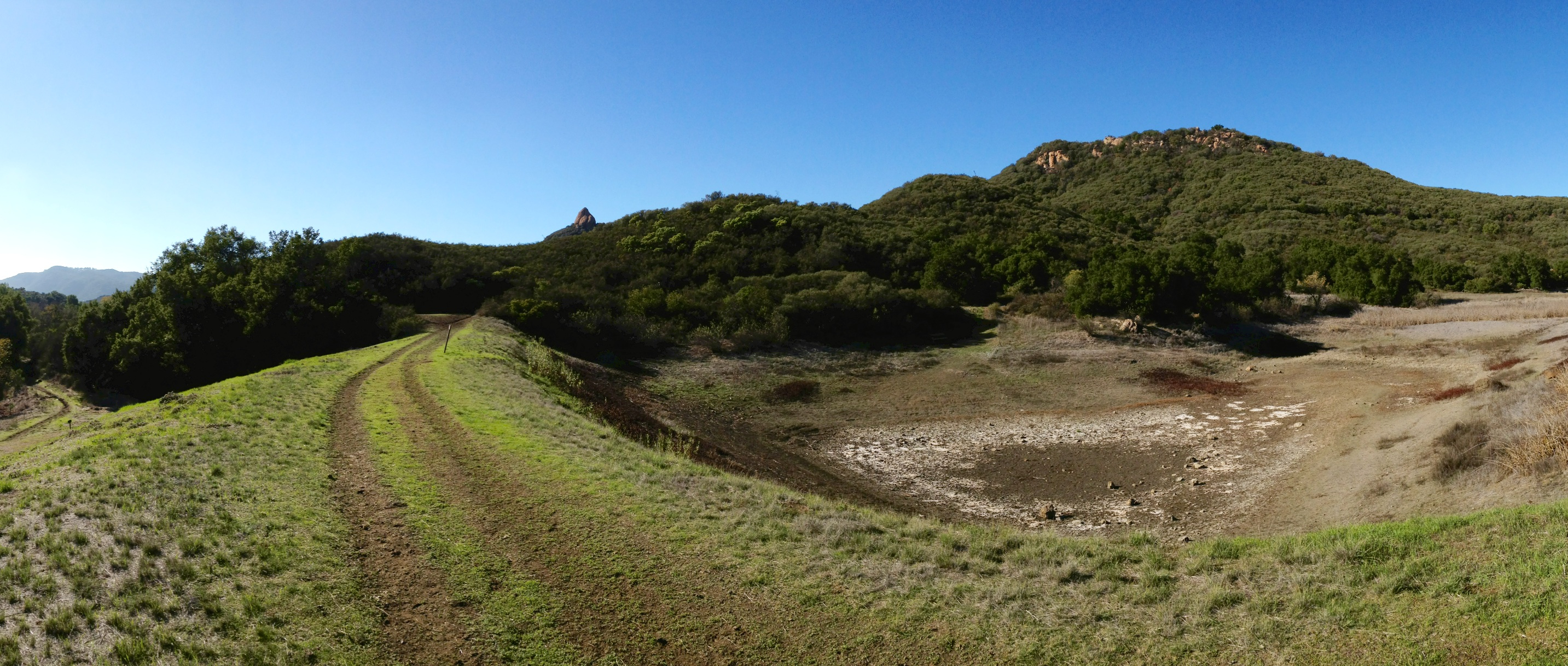
Wildlife pond and oak woodland at Rocky Oaks Park.

Rocky Oaks is a small nature reserve and wildlife refuge regional park on Mulholland Highway in the Santa Monica Mountains, within western Los Angeles County, southern California.

== Park geography ==
The park is located within the Santa Monica Mountains National Recreation Area and managed by the National Park Service. The park entrance is south/coastward of the town of Agoura Hills, and west of the Kanan-Dume Road intersection on Mulholland Highway.

=== Park features ===
Rocky Oaks park showcases various species of native oak trees and California sycamore trees, some centuries-old. It ranges in elevation from around 1,700–1,850 feet (520–560 m) in elevation.

Nature trails explore around the 200 acres (81 ha) of oak groves, coastal sage scrub and chaparral habitats, grasslands, and rock formations. Named trails include the Glade Trail, Pond Trail, and Rocky Oaks Loop Trail.

An earthen dam near the center of the park creates a seasonal pond for wildlife.

The UCLA La Kretz Center Field Station is adjacent on the west side of the park, part of the La Kretz Center for California Conservation Science in the UCLA Institute of the Environment and Sustainability of the College of Life Sciences.

== See also ==
- Flora of the Santa Monica Mountains
- Natural history of the Santa Monica Mountains
- Santa Monica Mountains National Recreation Area topics
