= Material World (radio programme) =

Science programme on BBC Radio 4, 1998–2013

- Genre: Current science
- Running time: 30 mins (Thursdays)
- Country of origin: UK
- Language: English
- Home station: BBC Radio 4
- Hosted by: Quentin Cooper, Sue Nelson
- Original release: 9 April 1998 – 27 June 2013
- Website: Official Webpage
- Podcast: Podcasts

Material World was a weekly science magazine programme broadcast on Thursday afternoons on BBC Radio 4. Its regular presenter was Quentin Cooper, with contributions from scientists who were researching areas discussed in each programme.

== History ==
The programme began in April 1998 as The Material World, presented by Trevor Phillips. Phillips was a chemistry graduate of Imperial College, and also one of the few regular black broadcasters on Radio 4.

In September 2000, Phillips was told that his close links with the Labour Party conflicted with BBC impartiality rules and meant he could no longer present BBC programmes. He was replaced with Quentin Cooper, who presented the programme until its end in 2013.

From 5 April 2010 the programme was repeated on Monday evenings at 21.00, the former slot of Costing the Earth. For a short time, when programmes on 5 Live began webstreaming with video, Material World was also webcast.

On 14 June 2013 it was announced that the show was to be cancelled and replaced by a new show, Inside Science. The last programme presented by Quentin Cooper was broadcast on 20 June 2013 with the final episode airing a week later on 27 June 2013, presented by Gareth Mitchell.

Material World was one of the BBC's main conduits for up-to-date scientific news, along with Frontiers, Science in Action, and Bang Goes the Theory.

== Structure ==
A typical episode covered three or four topics, giving each 7–10 minutes. For many years the programme was divided into two sections of fifteen minutes on separate topics. It took the form of interviewing a guest scientist or engineer. Cooper often ended the programme with a terrible scientific pun.

Many past programmes are available for online listening via the programme's website. Some sequential sets of programmes were made in collaboration with the Open University.

== See also ==
- Association of British Science Writers
