= Robert H. Meyer Memorial State Beach =

State beach in Los Angeles County, California, United States

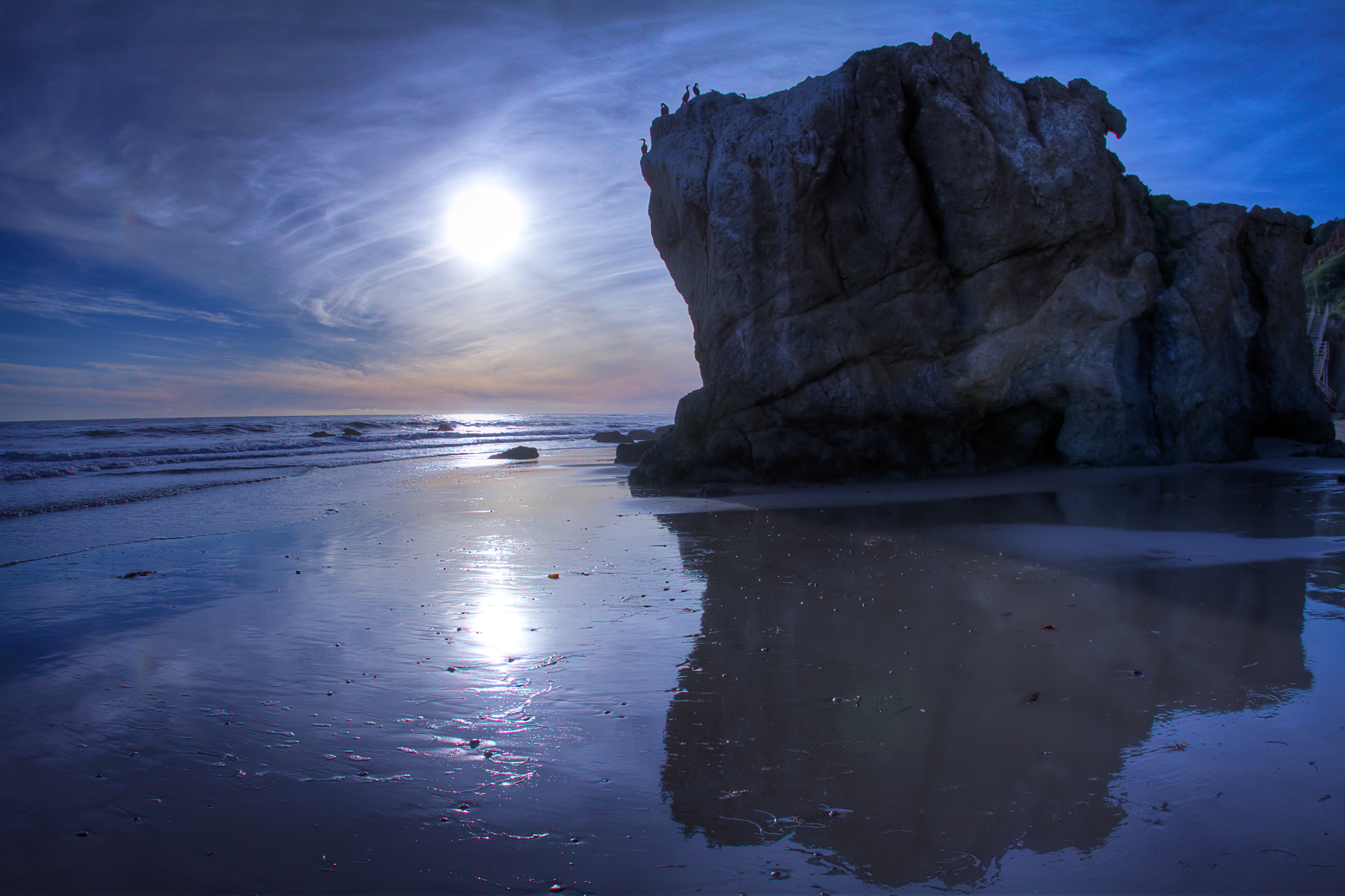
- Sunset at El Matador Beach, in Robert H. Meyer Memorial State Beach Park, Malibu.

- Location within California Location within the United States
- Location: Malibu
- Coordinates: 34°02′19″N 118°52′30″W
- Governing body: California Department of Parks and Recreation

Robert H. Meyer Memorial State Beach is a state beach of California, located in northern Malibu, Southern California.
The park is part of the Santa Monica Mountains National Recreation Area.

== Features ==
The park is made up of three small separate and distinct beach areas:

- El Pescador Beach
- La Piedra Beach
- El Matador Beach

Parking is atop the bluffs for each, with public access down to the coves and their beaches.

== See also ==
- California coastal sage and chaparral ecoregion
- Natural history of the Santa Monica Mountains
- List of beaches in California
- List of California state parks
