= Zuma Beach =

Public seashore, Los Angeles County, California

Coordinates: 34.021°N 118.831°W

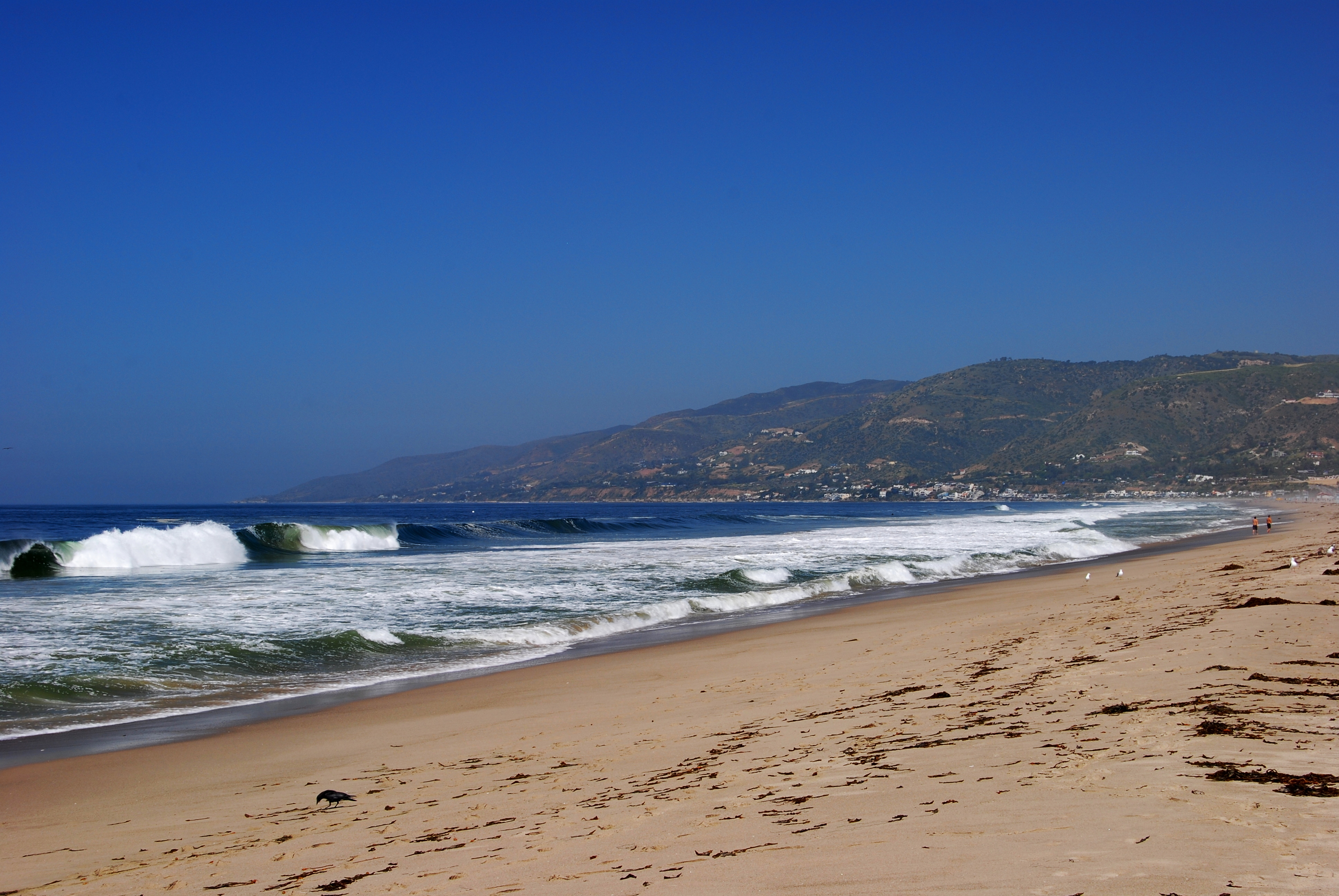
Zuma Beach, looking northwest, near the county park

Zuma Beach is a county beach at 30000 Pacific Coast Highway (PCH) in Malibu, California. One of the largest and most popular beaches in Los Angeles County, California, it is known for its long, wide sands and excellent surf. It consistently ranks among the healthiest beaches for clean water conditions in Los Angeles County.

== History ==
The beach's name may be related to the origin of the name of the nearby promontory, Point Dume, named by George Vancouver in 1793 in honor of Padre Francisco Dumetz of Mission San Buenaventura. The name was misspelled on Vancouver's map as "Dume" and was never corrected. On a plat map of the Rancho Topanga Malibu Sequit finally confirmed to new owner Matthew Keller in August 1870, the point is marked on the map as "Point Zuma or Duma".

== Features ==
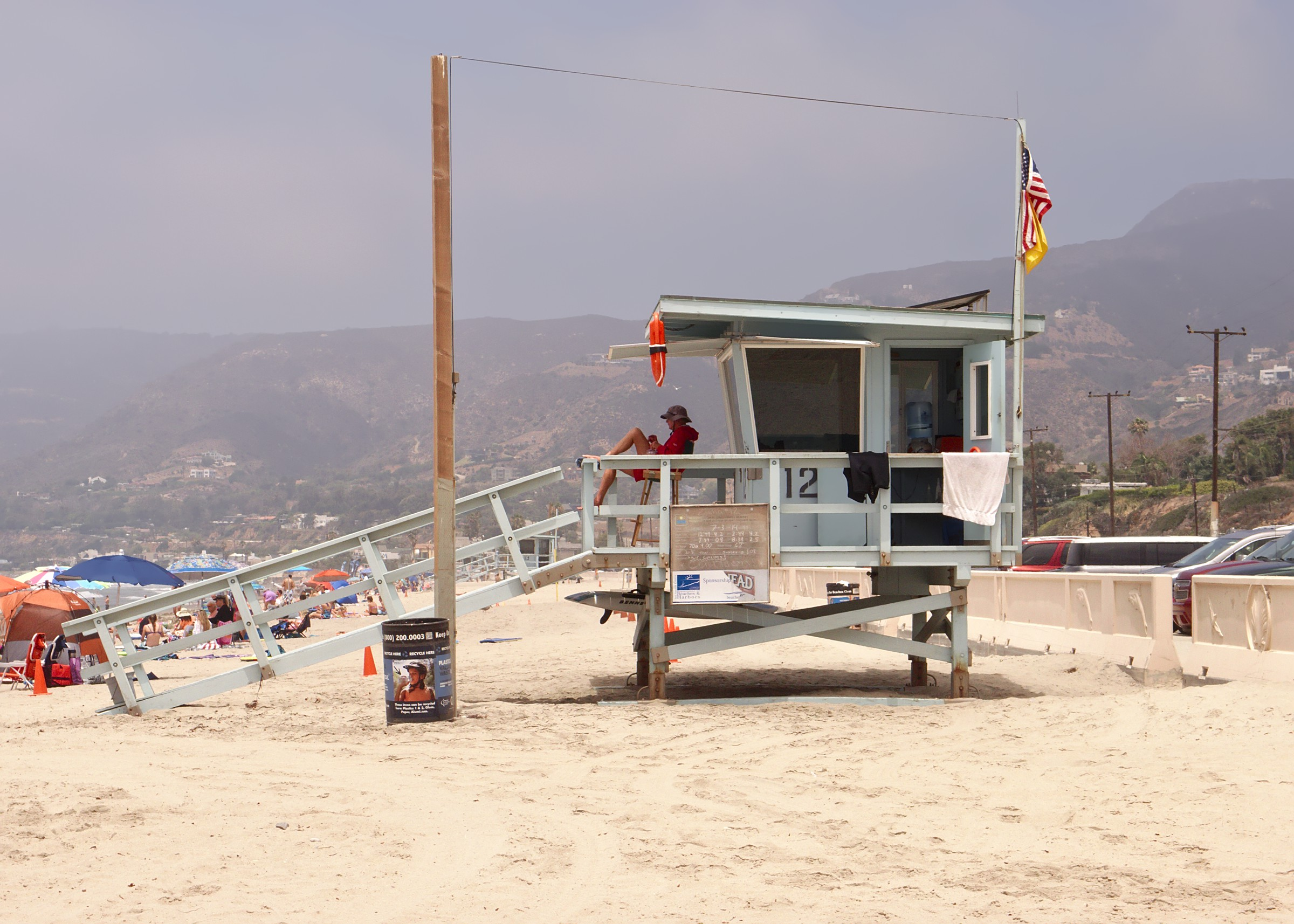
Lifeguard tower 12

Zuma is protected by the Lifeguard unit of the Los Angeles County Fire Department, with 14 lifeguard towers on the sands proper and one of four L.A. County Section Headquarters located at the center of the beach.

Like all beaches with good surf, Zuma has its share of rip currents. Visitors are encouraged not to swim or surf in front of the Lifeguard Headquarters between Towers 8 and 9, an area particularly prone to rip currents. In fact, rip currents are so prevalent that as of 2007 the Los Angeles County Fire Department Lifeguard Unit uses Zuma Beach to illustrate a rip current.

Zuma Beach hosts several premier surfing events each year. With optimum wind conditions nearly daily in the late afternoon, Zuma draws many to kitesurfing on the northern end of Zuma Beach.

Zuma Beach can be accessed directly from PCH, and lies between the major access corridors Las Virgenes Road/Malibu Canyon Road and Kanan-Dume Road to the southeast, and Las Posas Road to the northwest. Parking is available in a large fee parking lot. Additional parking is available on the adjacent PCH.

On its southeast side, Zuma is bordered by Westward Beach. Westward is geographically situated on Malibu's westernmost promontory known as Point Dume. Westward includes a stretch of 2-way road right at the sand's edge. Parking is available on the road as well as a fee parking lot. Westward Beach is marked by a shorter sand shelf than Zuma, a veritable pipeline, making the waves of less duration and higher impact. Westward Beach is recommended only for strong swimmers, as the wave action compared to Zuma Beach is stronger, can push down on swimmers, and delivers more of a "crunch." Westward Beach is where former lifeguard Jesse Billauer suffered the accident that left him paralyzed.

== Facilities ==
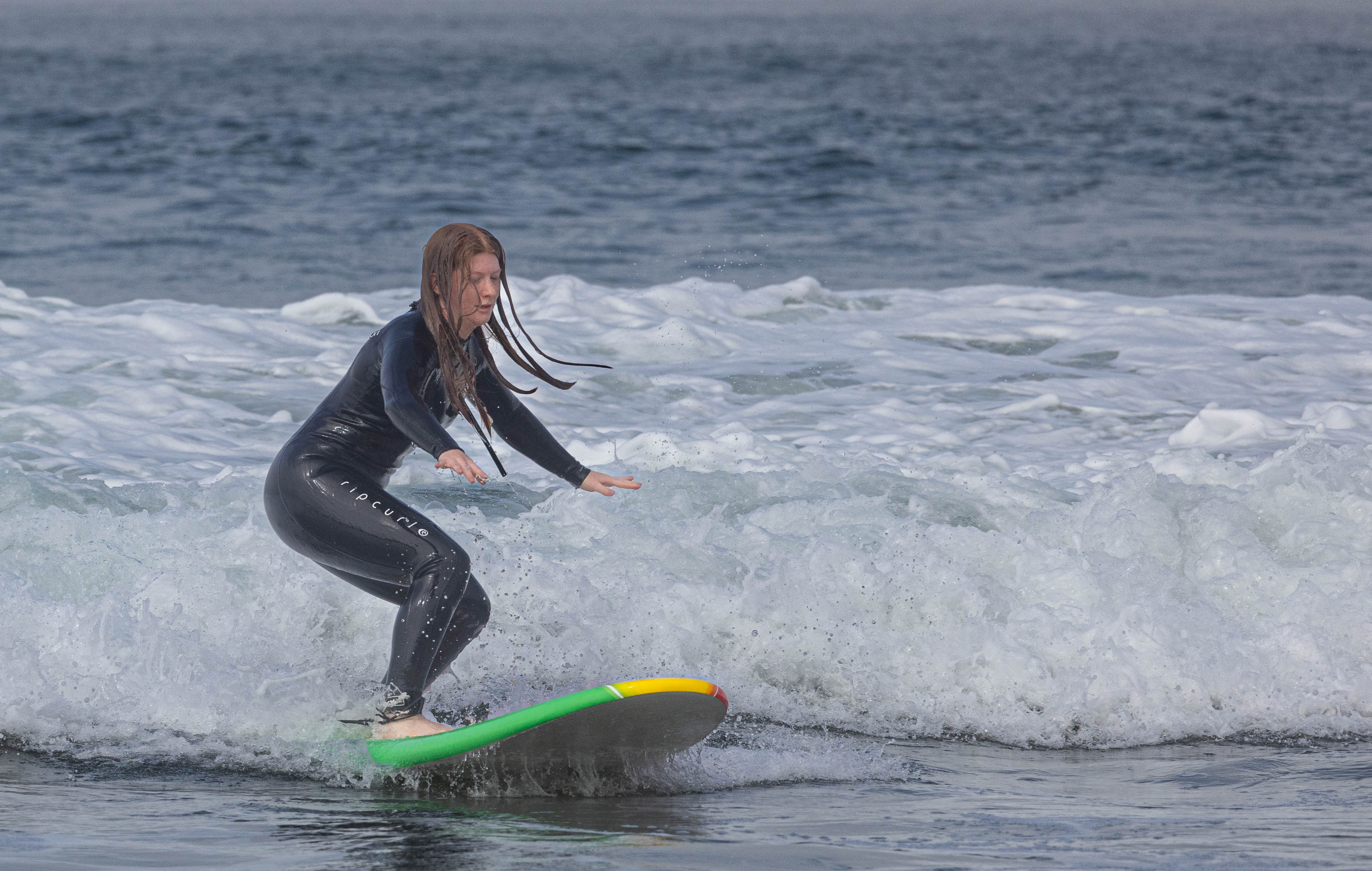
Surfing at Zuma beach

- Beach Volleyball courts (Pepperdine Waves beach volleyball)
- Bodyboarding
- Bodysurfing
- Diving (shallow)
- Fishing
- Food stands, seasonal
- Kiteboarding
- Outdoor showers (cold)
- Parking lot
- Restrooms
- Surfing
- Swimming; lifeguard on duty during daylight hours
- Walkway (wheelchair accessible)
- Windsurfing

Parking: 2025 spaces (43 disabled) Electric Vehicle - 3 inductive, 1 conductive

== Emergency use ==
During emergency conditions such as fires, mudslides or earthquakes, Zuma Beach is a designated emergency evacuation center. With its flat terrain, open parking, miles of pristine sand, and xeriscape landscaping, it is an optimal first-response open-air shelter. It has a dedicated helicopter landing area for medical emergency airlifts to trauma centers.

== Film location ==
With its proximity to the film and television industry in Los Angeles, Zuma Beach has been a popular filming location.

Films

- Planet of the Apes (1968) — the penultimate scenes were filmed on Zuma Beach near Point Dume and the final scene was filmed at Pirate's Cove Beach to the southwest.
- Zuma Beach (1978) — a television film directed by Lee H. Katzin
- Barton Fink (1991) — the final beach scene and the transitional image of a wave crashing against a rock.
- Indecent Proposal (1993) — directed by Adrian Lyne
- The "Ditch Day" scenes in The Fabelmans (2022) — directed by Steven Spielberg

Television

- I Dream of Jeannie (1965–1970) — as "a deserted island in the South Pacific" when Capt. Tony Nelson discovers Jeannie in the first episode
- Baywatch (1989–2001) — a frequently used site for the television series
- America's Next Top Model (2003–2015) — the location for a challenge commercial (cycle 22, 2015)
- Paw Patrol Zuma the water-loving Chocolate Labrador puppy was named after the beach
- Scorpion (2014–2018) — a location in Season 1, episode 12
- Succession (2018-2023) — the set location in the final scene of the episode Living+

== Events ==
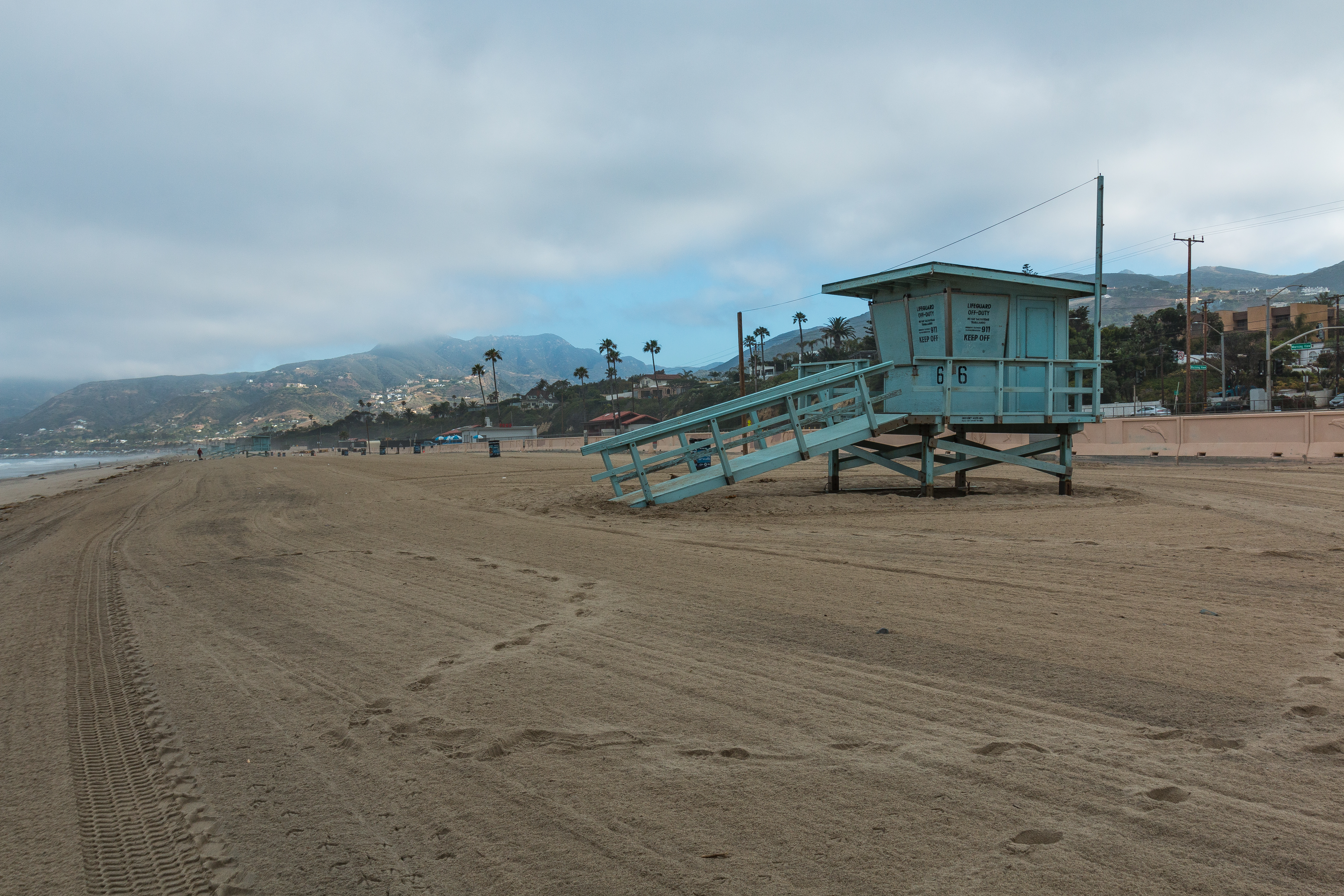
Zuma Beach in 2017

The Malibu Nautica Triathlon is an annual benefit for Children's Hospital of Los Angeles. The swim portion begins at Zuma Beach, followed by a bicycle segment along the length of the beach north to Deer Creek Canyon, capped by a run along the sidewalk fronting Zuma Beach. In its 34th year as of 2008, the event draws competitors from around the world but is best known in popular culture for the Hollywood celebrities and retired Olympic medalists who compete. Stars in recent Nauticas have been David Duchovny, Felicity Huffman, Carl Lewis, Jennifer Lopez, William H. Macy, and Matthew McConaughey. Many television stars also have competed. In 2008, the event raised nearly $980,000.

In September 2023, the permit for the Malibu Triathlon was transferred to the Zuma Foundation, an organization owned by Michael Epstein, the original organizer of the event. Under its new management, the event was rebranded as The Zuma Beach Triathlon.

Initially scheduled to debut in 2024, the event was subsequently canceled for that year. The Zuma Foundation has announced plans to host the triathlon in late 2025, marking a continuation of the tradition under its updated format and branding.
