= Quentin Cooper =

British science journalist (born 1961)

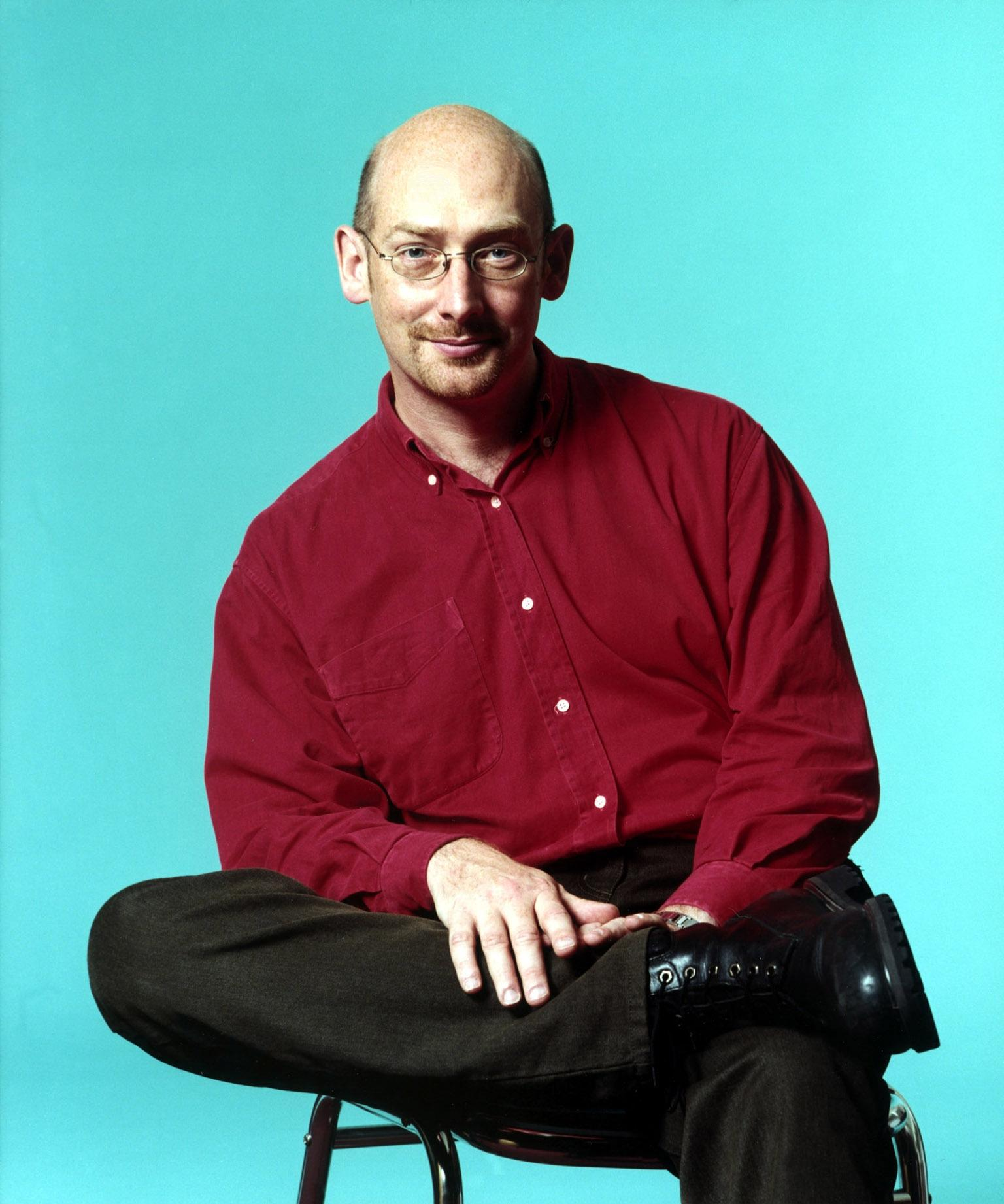
- Cooper in 2013
- Born: 1961 (age 64–65); Grimsby, Lincolnshire, England
- Spouse: Suba Subramaniam
- Children: 1
- Presenting career
- Show: Material World
- Station: BBC Radio 4
- Country: United Kingdom
- Previous shows: Connect, Kaleidoscope
- Quentin Cooper's voice recorded February 2013
- Website: www.bbc.co.uk/radio4/people/presenters/quentin-cooper

Quentin Cooper (born 1961, Grimsby) is a science journalist and facilitator, who presented BBC Radio 4's Material World from 2000 to 2013. He speaks at science festivals and lectures, and works regularly with science and educational organisations such as the Royal Society and the British Council.

== Early life ==
He lived on Dene Road Grimsby, the son of Harry and Pamela Cooper. His father had worked with the BBC.

Cooper attended Canon Ainslie Primary School, which closed in 1973, and Wintringham Grammar School in Grimsby, studied for a BSc in psychology and artificial intelligence at the University of Edinburgh and obtained a Postgraduate Diploma in Journalism Studies at University College Cardiff.

== Career ==
=== Broadcasting ===
At BBC Radio Scotland, in Glasgow, Cooper worked as a producer in News and Current Affairs, and youth programmes such as Bite the Wax, presented by Armando Iannucci, then Hit The North which first united Mark and Lard aka Mark Radcliffe and Marc Riley for Radio 5 in Manchester. On 3 July 1991, Hit The North featured the 'Fun Seekers Guide to Scunthorpe'.

Moving to London he produced arts programmes, and presented Kaleidoscope on Radio 4 in February 1992. In 1995 he presented 'Cling Film' on Radio 1. On Radio 5 Live he presented 'The Big Byte' on Sundays from 1996-98.

He was film critic for 5 Live, then for Radio 2's Parkinson's Sunday Supplement. Cooper presented the series Science Fix for BBC Four and New Scientist Reports for Discovery Channel.

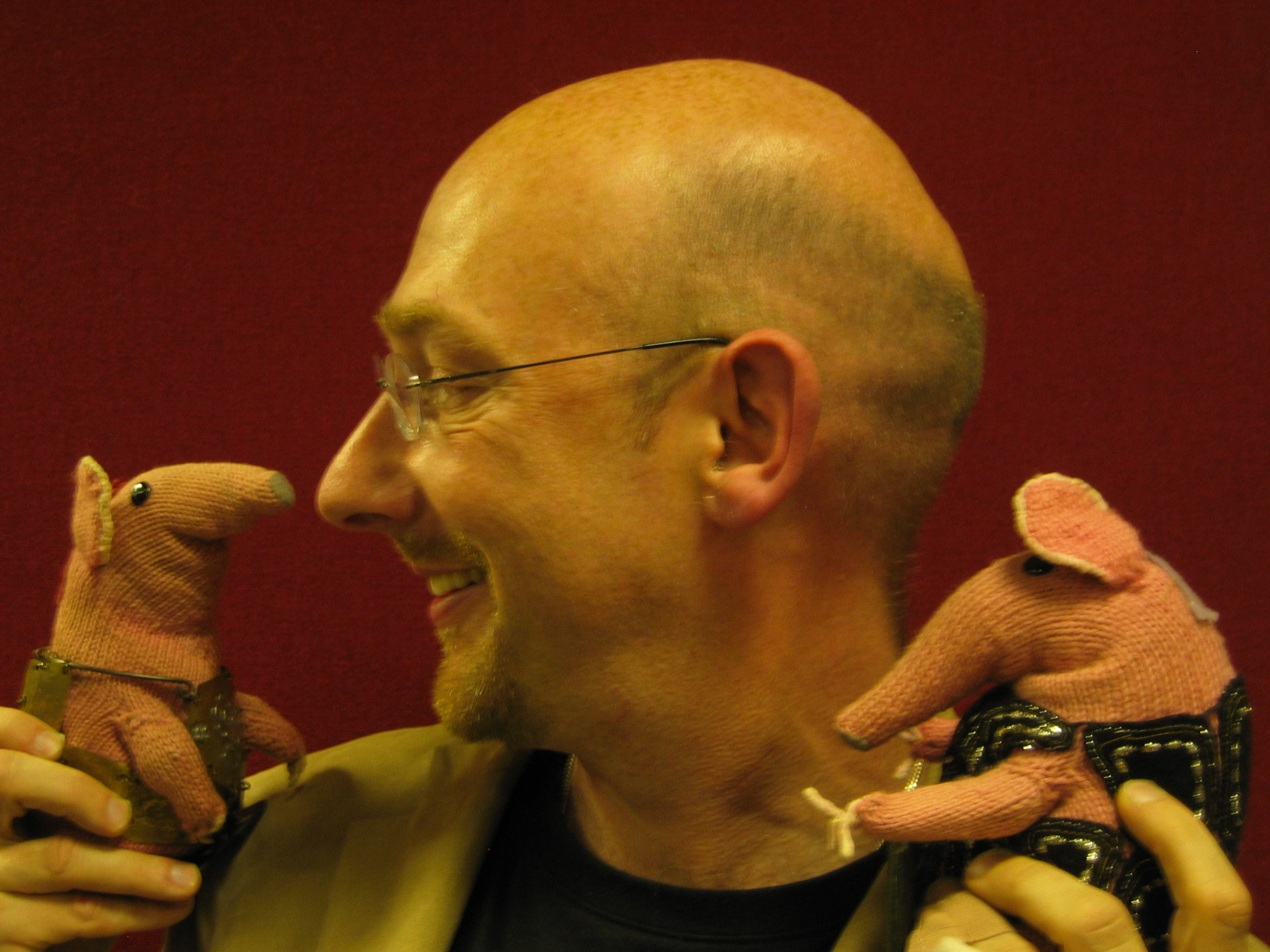
Cooper with two of the original Clangers, brought in to one of his BBC radio programmes

From 1999 to 2013 he presented Material World on Radio 4. Described by the Radio Times as "the most accessible, funny and conversational science programme on radio" and by Bill Bryson as "quite the best thing on radio", in the 2011 BBC Trust review of impartiality and accuracy of the BBC's coverage of science it was singled out for "particular praise".

Cooper is an occasional presenter of the BBC World Service discussion programme The Forum, and interviewer on the Transplant Links Community podcast.

=== Science communication ===
An advisor to many national and international science organisations and festivals and host of numerous recurring and one-off events and conferences, in 2011 he was given an Honorary Degree of Doctor of Science by Heriot-Watt University, in 2012 he was the first radio presenter to be made an Honorary Fellow of the Royal Society of Chemistry, and in 2013 the University of Edinburgh awarded him an Honorary Degree of Doctor of Science in recognition of his "major contribution to the public understanding of science and engineering".

=== Publications ===
In October 1994, he co-wrote Maypoles, Martyrs, and Mayhem: 366 days of British customs, myths and eccentricities (ISBN 978-0747518075) with Paul Sullivan, an almanac of British customs, myths and beliefs across the year, described by The Times as a "'A perfectly conceived compendium of culture' It was serialised by the Sunday Express

Cooper occasionally writes for national newspapers, and has been a columnist for publications including the Fortean Times, the Radio Times and the now defunct international BBC site BBC Future

== Personal life ==
On 26 September 2009, he married Suba Subramaniam at St Dunstan's church in Monks Risborough, Buckinghamshire. She is a choreographer and artistic director of Sadhana Dance, as well as an education director for Cape Farewell, UK, an organisation which brings together artists, scientists and schoolchildren to help explore and tackle problems relating to climate change.
