= Susan B. Nelson =

American conservationist (1927-2003)

- Born: Susan Louise Barr; April 13, 1927; Syracuse, New York
- Died: May 4, 2003 (aged 76); Los Angeles, California
- Education: UCLA
- Known for: Environmentalism
- Spouse: Earl Calvin Nelson Jr.
- Children: 4

Susan B. Nelson (April 13, 1927 – May 4, 2003) was an American environmental activist who is best known as the mother of the Santa Monica Mountains National Recreation Area.

== Early life ==
Sue Nelson was born Susan Louise Barr in Syracuse, New York, on April 13, 1927, the child of an accountant and a teacher. Her family moved to Los Angeles where she attended Alexander Hamilton High School and UCLA, graduating in 1948 with a degree in political science. She later earned a master's degree from UCLA in urban planning in 1969.

== Environmental activism ==
Nelson started her conservationist career as a housewife in Mandeville Canyon. She later became an active member in the Sierra Club, the Peace and Freedom Party, and the Green Party. In 1964 she helped to found the Friends of the Santa Monica Mountains, Parks and Seashore, and also became this group's president. She is credited by congressman Anthony Beilenson as being the single greatest driver behind the establishment by Congress in 1978 of the Santa Monica Mountains National Recreation Area, the first truly urban national park. Along with Nelson, two other women (Jill Swift and Margot Feuer) were instrumental in bringing about federal, legal recognition of the SMMNRA. In the years following this federal legislation, Nelson lobbied Congress to provide more funding to expand and improve the parkland. Nelson also worked on a variety of other conservation projects throughout the Los Angeles region in the 1980s and 1990s, including areas such as Malibu Creek State Park, Point Mugu, Hollywood, Temescal Canyon, and Topanga Canyon. She also voiced her vocal opposition, through newspaper opinion pieces and town hall meetings, to development projects such as the Malibu Canyon Freeway, the Pacific Coast Freeway, and the Mulholland Highway. In addition, Nelson sounded a warning bell against the privatization of public parklands. Her persistence led some to call her ruthless, but also warmhearted and feisty.

== Personal life ==
Nelson married Earl Nelson in 1948. Together they had four children, but the marriage ended in divorce. Nelson's son-in-law was the composer James Horner. She died on May 4, 2003, after she was hit by a car near her home in Echo Park, Los Angeles.

== Legacy ==
Nelson's archives are held in Special Collections and Archives at the University Library of California State University, Northridge.
