= Sue Nelson =

British science writer and broadcaster

Susan Nelson (born 5 June 1961) is a British science writer and broadcaster. She is a former BBC science correspondent.

== Early life and education ==
Nelson attended Wirral Grammar School for Girls, and studied physics at University College Cardiff. She won a Knight-Wallace Fellowship at the University of Michigan in 2004.

== Career ==
Nelson was presenter of Formula Five on BBC Radio 5 from 1990 to 1994. In 1997 she presented Right Stuff, Wrong Sex : Female Astronauts. From 1997 to 2005 she was a science and technology correspondent for BBC News 24 and the science correspondent for the BBC Television News. She was a presenter of The Material World on BBC Radio 4. Nelson has also presented a number of science series on Radio 4, including Britain's Modern Brunels and Citizen Scientist in 2006. She produced Women with the Right Stuff on the BBC World Service. She began to present the Planet Earth podcasts in 2008. In 2010 she was made editor of The Biologist.

Nelson makes films for the European Space Agency. She hosts the podcast Space Boffins through her media company Boffin Media, which has welcomed guests such as Buzz Aldrin, Eileen Collins, Helen Sharman and Tim Peake. She presented the 2017 BBC World Service documentary Before I Go. In 2018 she was taken to SAI International School with the British Council.

=== Books ===
In 2004, she wrote How to Clone the Perfect Blonde. In 2011 she published How to Live Forever: Lives Less Ordinary. The rights to Nelson's third book,Wally Funk's Race for Space: On the Road with a Forgotten Pioneer of Aviation, were acquired by The Westbourne Press in November 2017. Wally Funk was one of the Mercury 13. It will be released in October 2018.

=== Personal life ===
At age 60 Nelson was diagnosed with autism.

=== Awards ===
- Association of British Science Writer’s Award
- BT Technology Journalist Award for Robo Sapiens
- Glaxo Wellcome Science Writers' Award
- New York Festival International Radio Program Award 2018
