= Matthew Keller =

American politician

Matthew Keller or Mathew Keller (1810–1881) was an early agriculturalist, vintner and distiller in Los Angeles, California, shortly after it became part of the United States following the Mexican War. He was also on the county Board of Supervisors and on the Common Council, the city's governing body.

== Personal ==
Keller was born in Queenstown, County Cork, Ireland, in 1810 according to his grandson he graduated from Trinity College, Dublin but in fact Trinity College did not let in Catholics until 1970 and they had no record of his attending. He was well educated and his business ventures show how intelligent he was. He married Eliza Christie and when he died in 1881 he was survived by three children, Caroline E. Shafer, Alice Shafer and Henry Workman Keller. Eight children predeceased their parents.

As a mark of respect, Keller was known as Don Mateo (Spanish for "Matthew").

== Business and agriculture ==
He moved to Texas in the mid-1830s, then spent "the next twelve to fifteen years" in Mexico. While in Guadalajara, he met Andrew A. Boyle, and the two returned to the United States — with Keller going at first to New Orleans, then to San Francisco in 1849 and finally to Los Angeles in 1851.

Keller opened a general store at the corner of Los Angeles and Commercial streets and also purchased ten acres from Manuel Requena at Alameda and Aliso streets, where Union Station is now situated.

There he built his home, planted fruit trees and vineyards. In 1852 he established his winery and brandy still, to be known as the Rising Sun and Los Angeles Vineyards winery. He had warehouses in San Francisco, New York, and Philadelphia. In addition, he experimented with various agricultural crops — fruit trees, castor oil plants, hops and cotton.

It was said that "At full capacity, the winery could turn out 200 gallons of brandy and 1,000 gallons of wine daily. Keller's sherry was particularly good and won many awards at county fairs."

Keller was called the "father of horticulture in Los Angeles" because, as writer Stanley Gordon put it, "In 1853 he planted orange trees from seeds obtained in Central America and Hawaii. He experimented with exotic trees, cotton, rice and tobacco." When he sent a bunch of his grapes to the U.S. Patent Office in 1856, "it was almost doubted . . . if such products are common in California."

Keller was an original director of the Farmers & Merchants Bank and of the Pioneer Oil Company. In 1857 he purchased the 13,000-acre Rancho Malibu, "whose title was finally confirmed to him in 1864 after much litigation regarding its clouded title." He sold it to Frederick H. Rindge.

== Public affairs ==
Keller was public administrator for Los Angeles County from 1854 to 1858 and on the Board of Supervisors from 1864 to 1867. He was a member of the Los Angeles Rangers, a Vigilance Committee and the fire department.

He was also a member of the Los Angeles Common Council, the governing body of the city, in 1852–53 and 1868–69.

== Legacy ==
The Keller name is memorialized in two Downtown Los Angeles city streets where the family once owned property — Keller Street and Mateo Street.

A hiking trail in Solstice Canyon in the Santa Monica Mountains is named in honor of his winery — the Rising Sun Trail. The remains of a stone cottage that Keller built in 1865, believed to be the oldest stone building in Malibu, can be seen from the trail. It "survived many wildfires but was finally destroyed in the 2007 Corral Fire."
