= Point Dume =

Coastal landform in California, United States

Point Dume State Beach
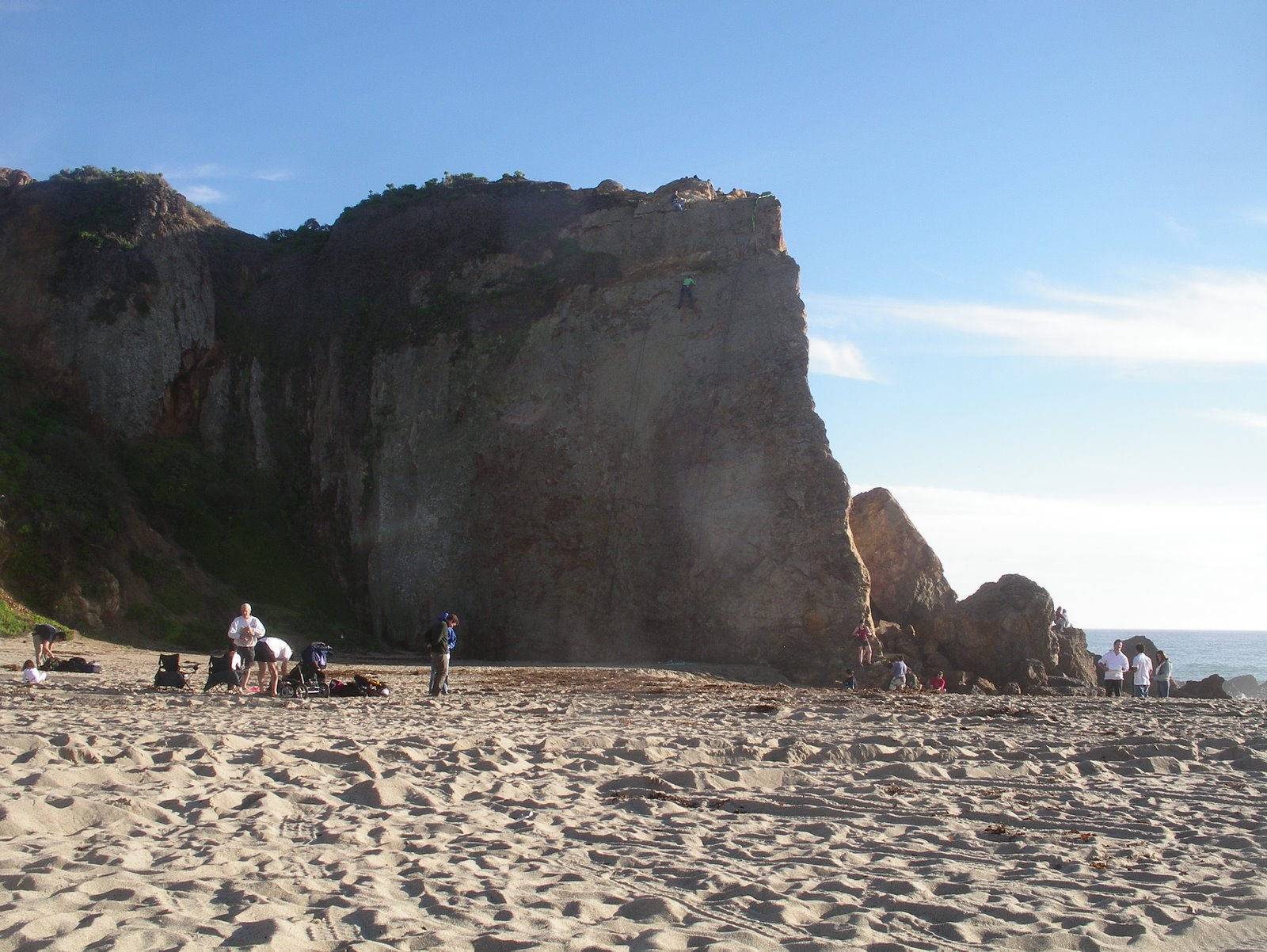

- Location within California Location within the United States
- Location: Malibu, California
- Nearest city: Malibu, California
- Coordinates: 34°0′3.14″N 118°48′24.62″W
- Governing body: California Department of Parks and Recreation

California Historical Landmark
- Reference no.: 965

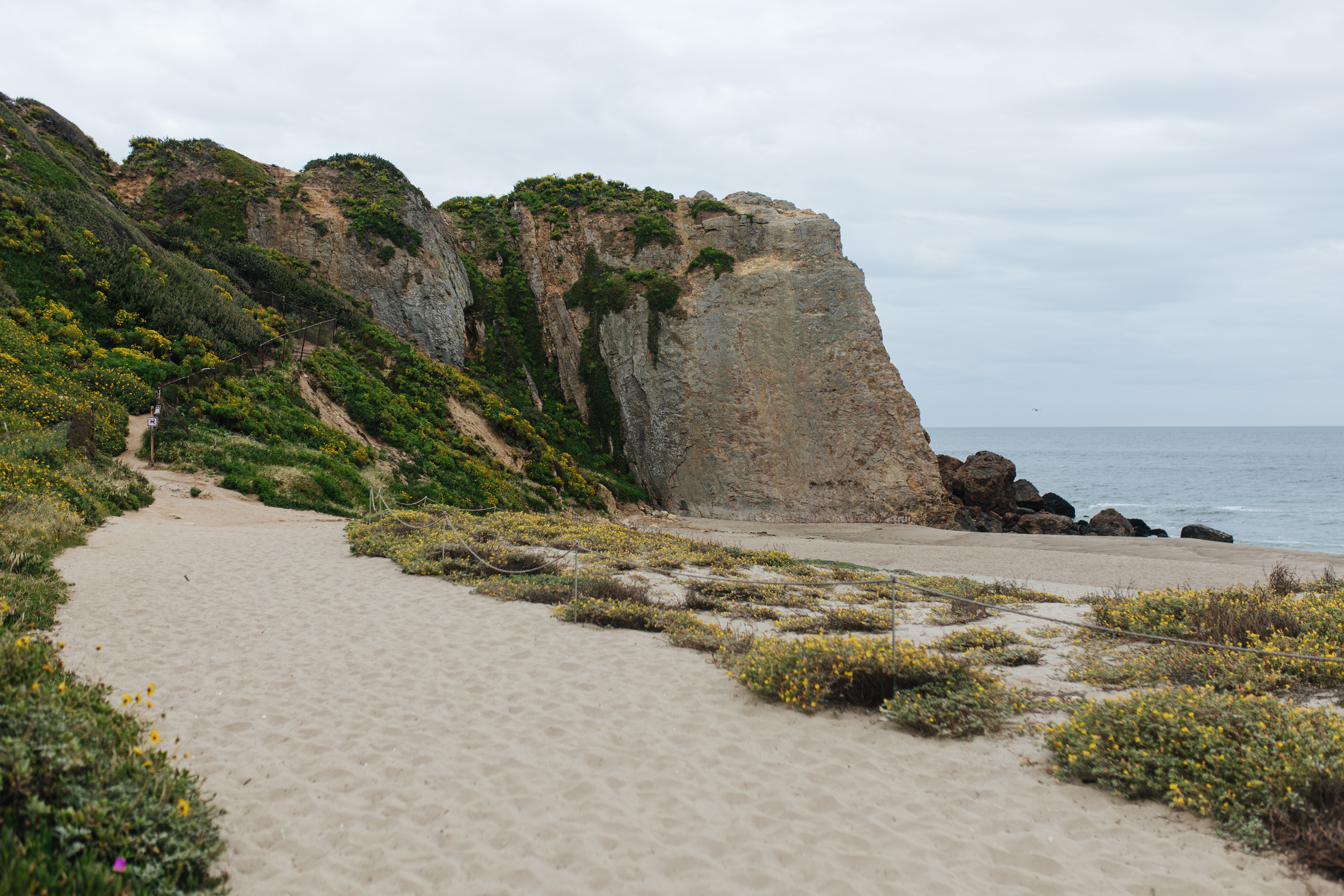
Cliff at Point Dume State Beach in 2023

Point Dume is a promontory on the coast of Malibu, California, that juts out into the Pacific Ocean. The point, a long bluff, forms the northern end of Santa Monica Bay. Point Dume Natural Area affords a vista of the Palos Verdes Peninsula and Santa Catalina Island. Zuma Beach lies to its immediate northwest.

== History ==
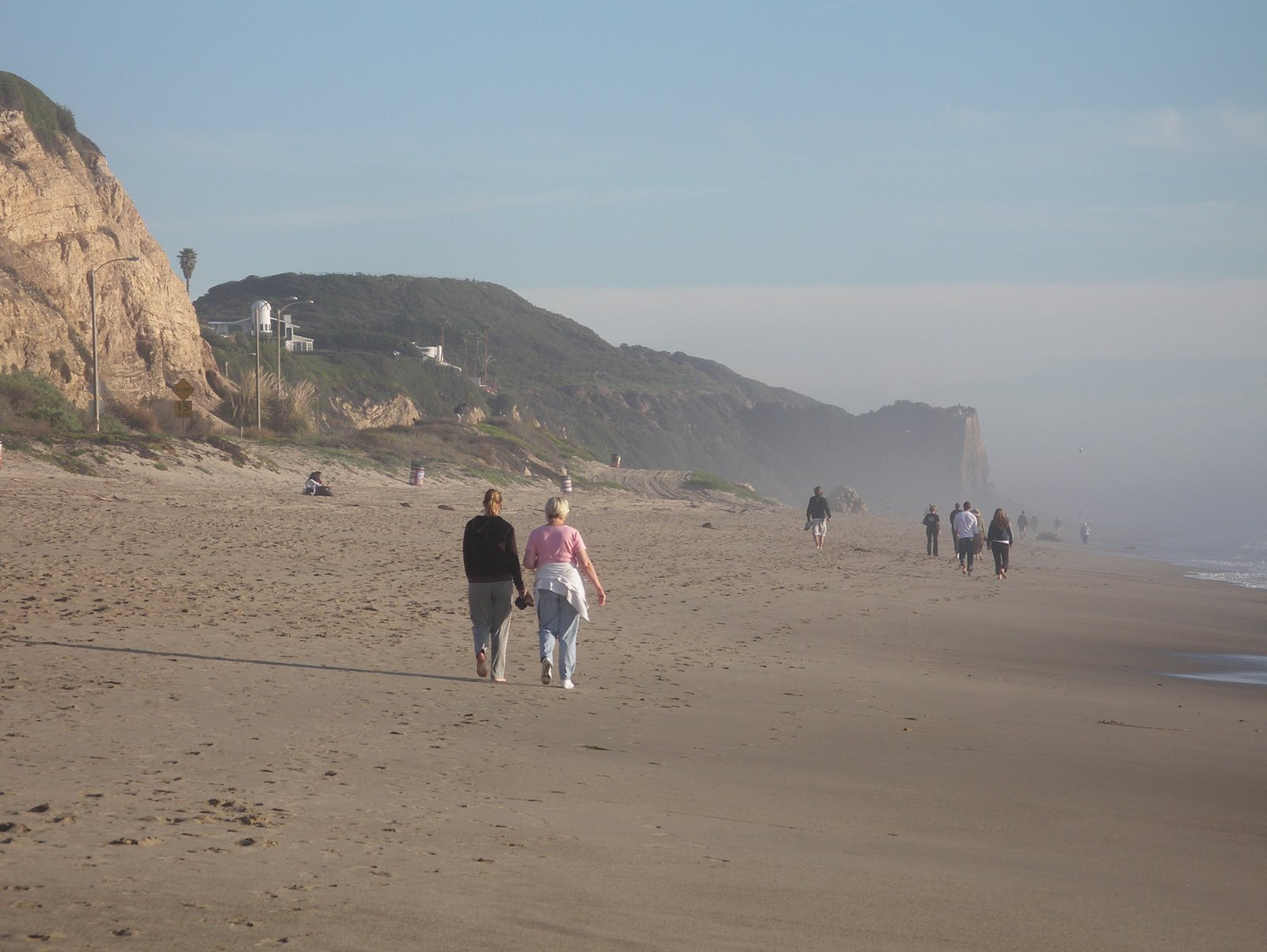
Point Dume viewed from the northwest on Zuma Beach.

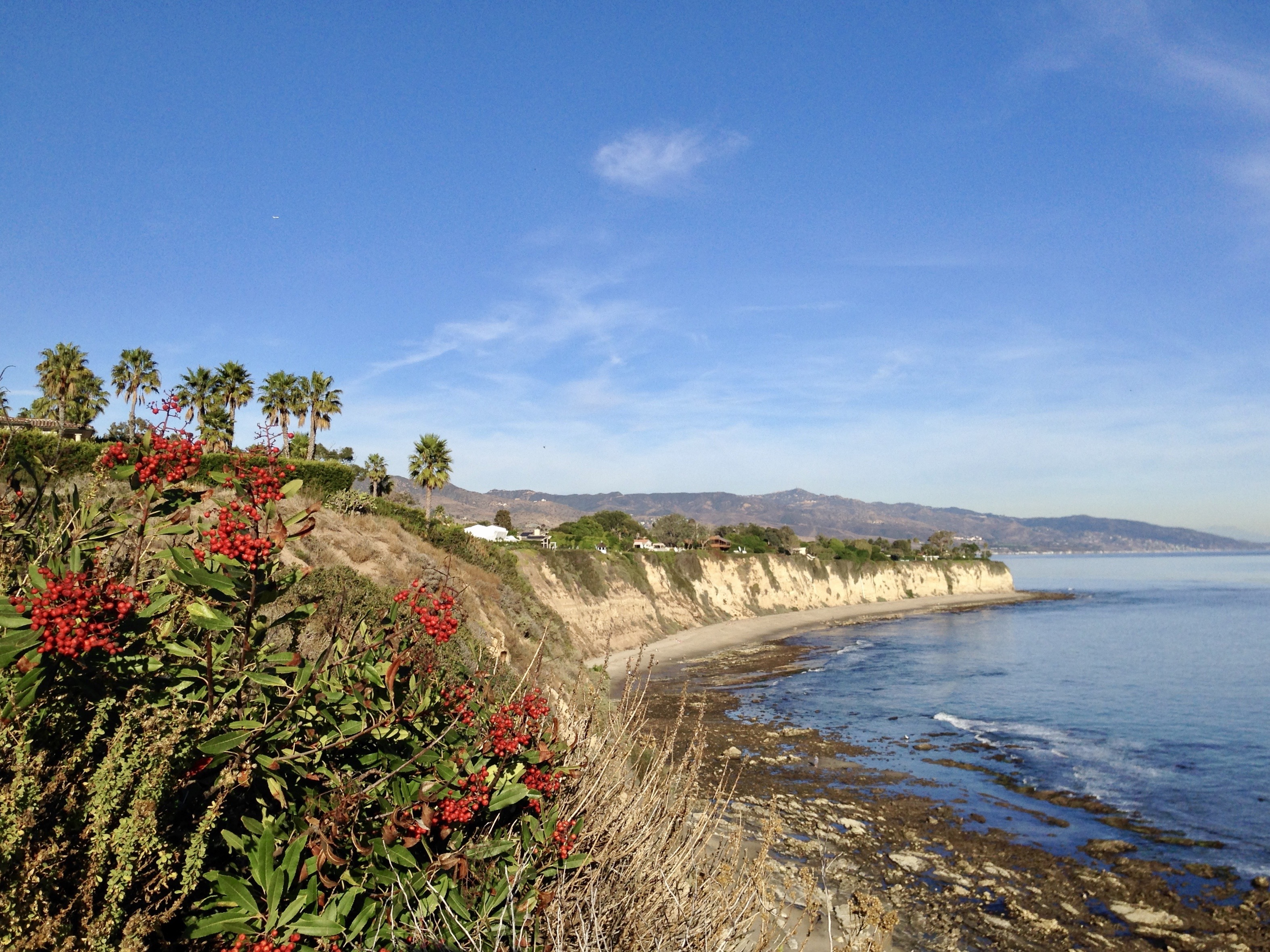
View south from the bluffs at Point Dume State Beach, California

Point Dume was named by George Vancouver in 1793 in honor of Padre Francisco Dumetz of Mission San Buenaventura. The name was misspelled on Vancouver's map as "Dume" and was never corrected. On a plat map of the Rancho Topanga Malibu Sequit finally confirmed to new owner Matthew Keller in August 1870, the point is marked on the map as "Point Zuma or Duma".

In the mid-1930s, the 900-ton steam-schooner California, of the California Whaling Company, would anchor in Paradise Cove about a mile offshore, near Point Dume, and process whales caught by her two "killer boats", the Hawk and Port Saunders. She spent about four months there each winter (December–April), mostly flensing gray whales on their annual migration from Alaska to Baja California and back. Emerson Gaze, a reporter who spent a day with the fleet, said they had caught over fifty whales up to late January 1936, nearly all gray (with the exception of a few humpback and sperm whales). Nial O’Malley Keyes, in his book Blubber Ship, reported large numbers of whales were caught within a mile of Malibu (in or before 1934), a reference to the Point Dume operation.

Up until the 1940s, Point Dume was a windblown, treeless bluff covered by native chaparral. Post–World War II the bluff became slowly settled. Those settlers planted trees and other non-native flora among their single-family homesteads. In 1968, Point Dume Elementary School opened, but closed in 1980. In the early 1980s, real estate development interests began pronouncing the name "du-MAY" and spelling it "Dumé"; this did not catch on. It reopened in 1996 and remains open today, now known as the Malibu Elementary School. By 2007, many of the simple homesteads were torn down to make way for mansions and mega-mansions behind walls, many with expansive ocean views, while other large homes were surrounded by mature trees.

== State preserve ==
The northwesternmost tip of Point Dume has been designated Point Dume Nature Preserve. Located along Cliffside Drive, very limited parking is available. Its beach is protected by the Lifeguard unit of the Los Angeles County Fire Department. Two scenic overlooks can be visited via 1 mile (1.6 km) of hiking trails on the headland. When the 10 parking spaces on Cliffside Drive are unavailable, Point Dume Nature Preserve can be reached by hiking up from Westward Beach.

== Rock climbing ==
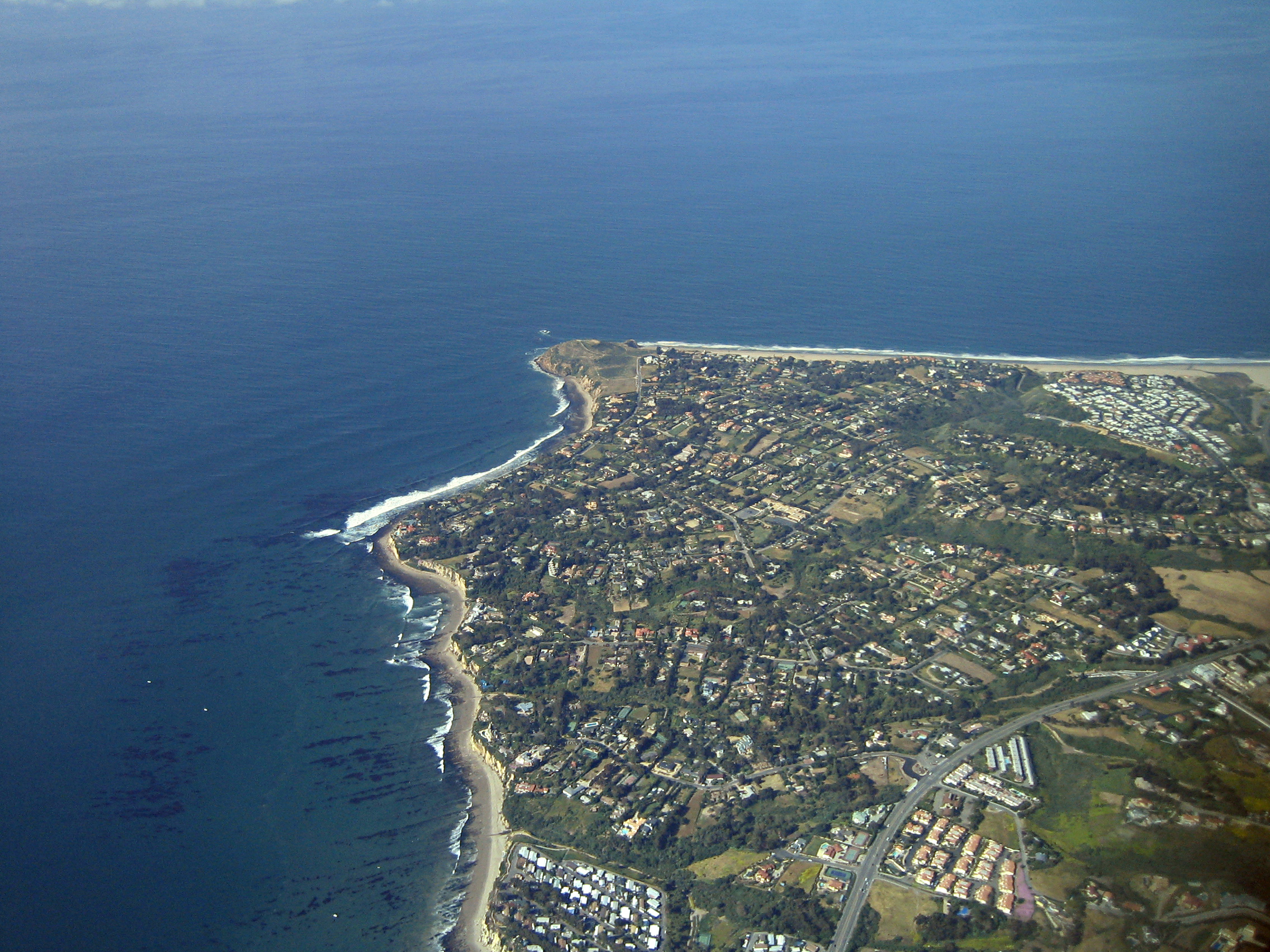
Point Dume viewed from the air, facing northwest

Point Dume is home to a handful of very moderate single pitch rock climbing routes that are usually climbed on top rope from established fixed anchors. It is a common place to take novice climbers due to the ease of access and ease of routes.

== Wildlife ==
There is a wide variety of wildlife located at Point Dume.

Along the shore, the weathering of the volcanic rock creates an intricate and extensive system of shallow tidepools. These tidepools serve as concealed shelters for a variety of marine creatures such as crabs, urchins, mussels, octopuses, and small fish such as sculpin and juvenile garibaldi when the tide ebbs away.

During the daylight, a diverse array of wildlife emerges. This includes the presence of coyotes, skunks, raccoons, ground squirrels, and rabbits. Additionally, the region hosts a rich biodiversity of smaller creatures, with five species of butterflies, six varieties of snakes, and various lizard species, among them the distinctive silvery legless lizard. There are over one hundred species of birds, including brown pelicans, plovers, wrens, roadrunners, burrowing owls, falcons, and hawks.

Offshore, the nutrient-rich and frigid waters of the Pacific enhance the entire marine food web, from primary producers such as algae and zooplankton to apex predators such as sand sharks, bottlenose dolphins, and gray whales. Within the Marine Protected Areas (MPAs), the diverse seafloor topography encompasses hills, valleys, grooves, and channels, creating optimal habitats for species such as white seabass, giant sea bass, kelp bass, and lobster. Commonly, harbor seals, sea lions, and dolphins frequent these areas. From February on into the spring, humpback and gray whales, particularly newborn whale calves, are frequently observed as they undertake their coastal migrations.

== Geology ==
The offshore faults west of Point Dume in southern California are part of a regional fault system extending about 200 kilometers from Los Angeles to the Channel Islands. This system poses a significant earthquake hazard to Los Angeles due to multiple active fault strands.

Some of the primary offshore faults have experienced 3–5 kilometers of cumulative displacement, with evidence of current activity through seafloor deformation. The primary offshore fault is the Dume fault, showing Holocene displacement.

Onshore, the Malibu Coast fault is active and has a steep northward dip with left-oblique slip. Its likely offshore extension disrupts shallow sediment layers, indicating Holocene activity. A structure near Sycamore Knoll, transverse to the main faults, may be significant for regional earthquake hazard analysis, potentially acting as a rupture segment boundary.

== Filming location ==
With its close proximity to the United States' film and television industry's center, Point Dume's Westward Beach continues to be a popular filming location for films, television, advertisements, and videos, appearing frequently whenever a beach scene is needed.

Jackie Treehorn's beach party in The Big Lebowski was filmed near the cliff face.

Important scenes in the Planet of the Apes series were filmed at Point Dume's Westward Beach.

The 1974 cult horror film Messiah of Evil was set in and shot on location in Point Dume.

In the Iron Man films set in the Marvel Cinematic Universe, the protagonist Tony Stark's huge seaside mansion was set on Point Dume at the edge of a cliff overlooking the Pacific Ocean, and was given the fictional address of 10880 Malibu Point, 90265. The interior shots were filmed on real sets, but the mansion itself is fictional, instead being created as a 3D model and digitally placed on the cliffs in post-production; Point Dume is a protected area, so construction on its cliffs is strictly prohibited.

The ashes of American horror movie actor Vincent Price were scattered here in 1993.

The music video "Sandcastles in the Sand" for the TV show How I Met Your Mother was filmed on Point Dume State Beach.

The season 3 finale of Angel was set on cliffs above Point Dume State Beach, but was filmed to the west at Leo Carrillo State Park.

The TV series Son of the Beach was frequently filmed on Point Dume State Beach.

An episode of the television series Modern Family was filmed on Point Dume State Beach.

The pilot episode of I Dream of Jeannie was filmed at Point Dume, which served as the deserted South Pacific island where astronaut Tony Nelson's (Larry Hagman) capsule washed ashore and he released Jeannie (Barbara Eden) from 2,000 years of imprisonment.

The wedding in the season 2 finale of Chuck was filmed on Point Dume State Beach.

The season 1 episode "Dominoes" of the television series Scorpion was mostly set at Point Dume.

In 1984 and 1988, Point Dume stood in for Stefano DiMera's underground cliff base on the daytime drama Days of Our Lives.

In season 2 of The Last Man on Earth, the home in Malibu where the characters live is (fictitiously) set on Point Dume.

Point Dume was featured in season 5 episode 8 of Baywatch when two contestants have to be rescued by Matt Brody.

For the film 2017 Dunkirk, Fionn Whitehead and Harry Styles underwent training sessions at Point Dume to enable them to become acclimatized to the cold water scenes.

It was used in the Power Rangers franchise for multiple seasons, most notably where the Time Ship lands in Power Rangers Time Force.

== California Historical Landmark ==
California Historical Marker on the site reads:

NO. 965 POINT DUME—On November 24, 1793, English explorer George Vancouver, commander of an expedition to determine the extent of settlement of the northwest coast of America, named this rocky promontory, Point Dume, after his Franciscan friend, Father Francisco Dumetz, at Mission San Buenaventura. Point Dume is the western terminus of Santa Monica Bay and has been an important landmark for navigators since Vancouver's voyage in 1793.

== See also ==
- California Historical Landmarks in Los Angeles County
- List of beaches in California
- List of California state parks
