= Exchange Peak =

Mountain in the United States of America

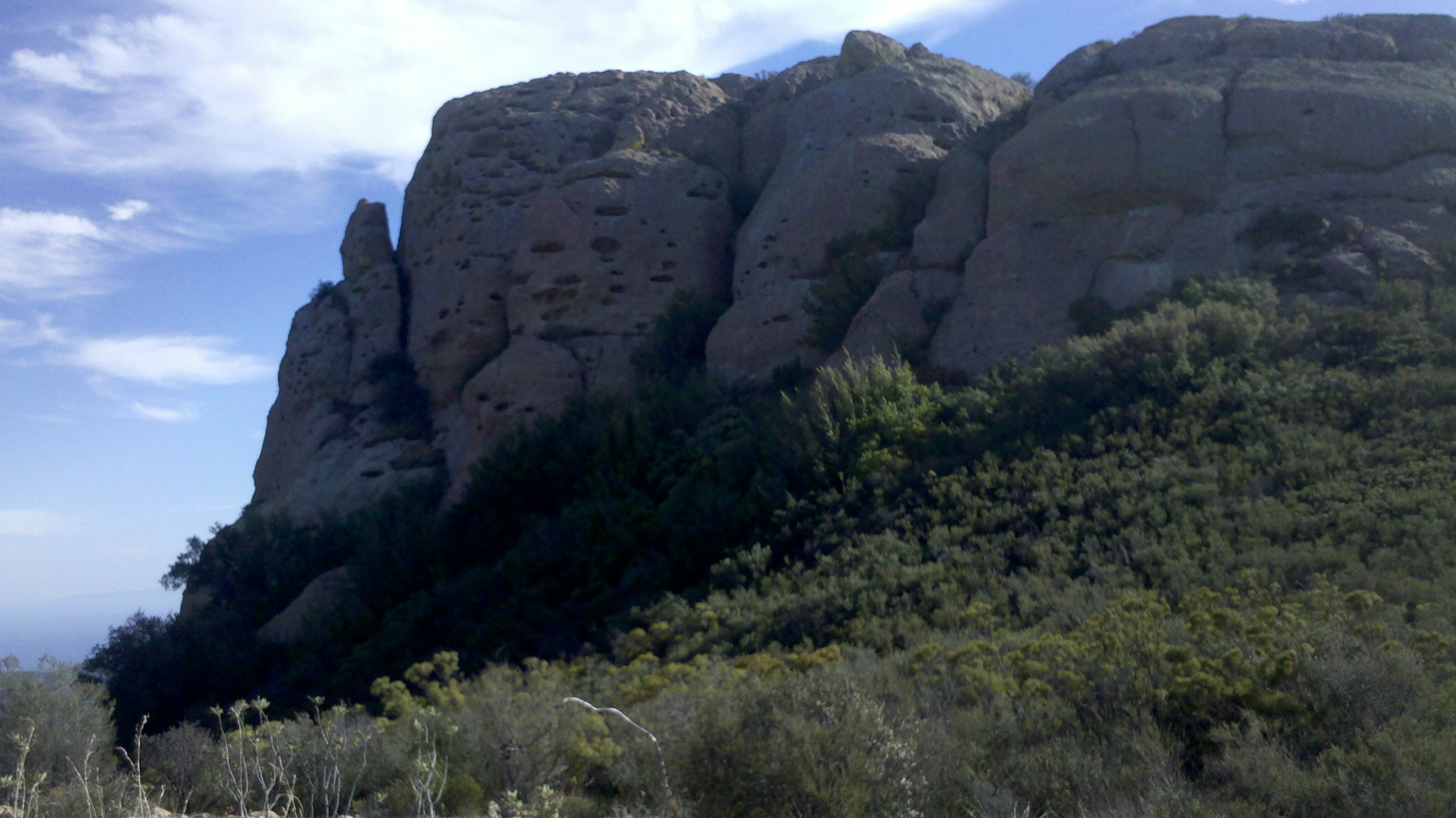

Highest point
- Elevation: 2,953 ft (900 m)
- Prominence: 213 ft (65 m)
- Isolation: 0.56 mi (0.90 km)
- Coordinates: 34°06′53″N 118°56′46″W

Geography
- Location within California Location within the United States
- Location: Ventura County, California, U.S.
- Parent range: Santa Monica Mountains

Climbing
- Easiest route: close to Backbone Trail, but access obstructed by dense chaparral

Exchange Peak is the third highest point in the Santa Monica Mountains (after Sandstone Peak and the highest of the Tri-Peaks), with an elevation of 2,953 feet (900 m).

== See also ==
- Santa Monica Mountains
- Santa Monica Mountains National Recreation Area
- Backbone Trail
