= Saddle Peak (California) =

Mountain in California, United States

- The west face of Saddle Peak in 2026

Highest point
- Elevation: 2,789 ft (850 m)
- Coordinates: 34°04′33.14″N 118°39′30.80″WGNIS 256074

Geography
- Location: Malibu, California, U.S.
- Parent range: Santa Monica Mountains

Saddle Peak is a mountain located in the Santa Monica Mountains between Malibu and Calabasas. The summit is accessible via the Backbone Trail. There is also a feeder trail to the top from near the top of Stunt Road (one block below the ridge intersection with Scheuren Road at the viewpoint) maintained by the Santa Monica Mountains Conservancy and an informal trail up the bottom east nose of the massif across from the Scheuren Viewpoint. This latter trail passes a water tower and joins the main trails near the top.

Saddle Peak's true summit, the South Eastern hummock, is much degraded. Views from the peak are of the Pacific Ocean to the west, and other Santa Monica Mountains ridges and peaks to the east and west. Saddle Peak has a second summit to the northwest; it is reached by a private road and blocked by a wire-fenced compound, inside of which are numerous radio relay towers. A house foundation in disrepair is located beyond the compound, on a slope that burned in 1989. Beyond and below the slope is a private road that connects to Stunt Road, with private residences below.

Vegetation is sparse on the peak; dwarf forest and chaparral are located on the approaches, with scrub and grass at the top. There are also oaks at lower elevations and occasionally are rattlesnakes on the peak's trails.

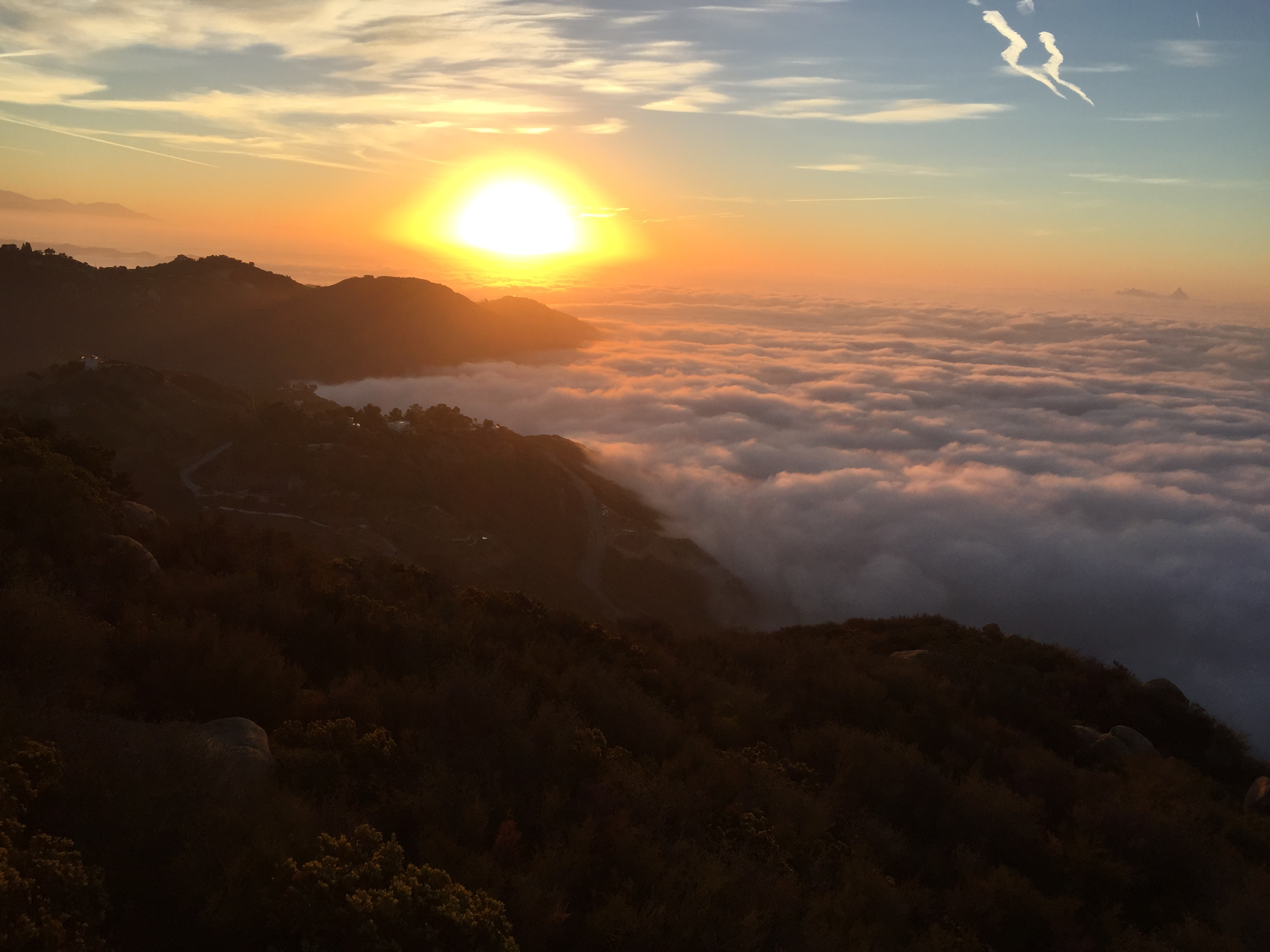
View from Saddle Peak
