= Tri Peaks (Santa Monica Mountains) =

Mountain in California, United States

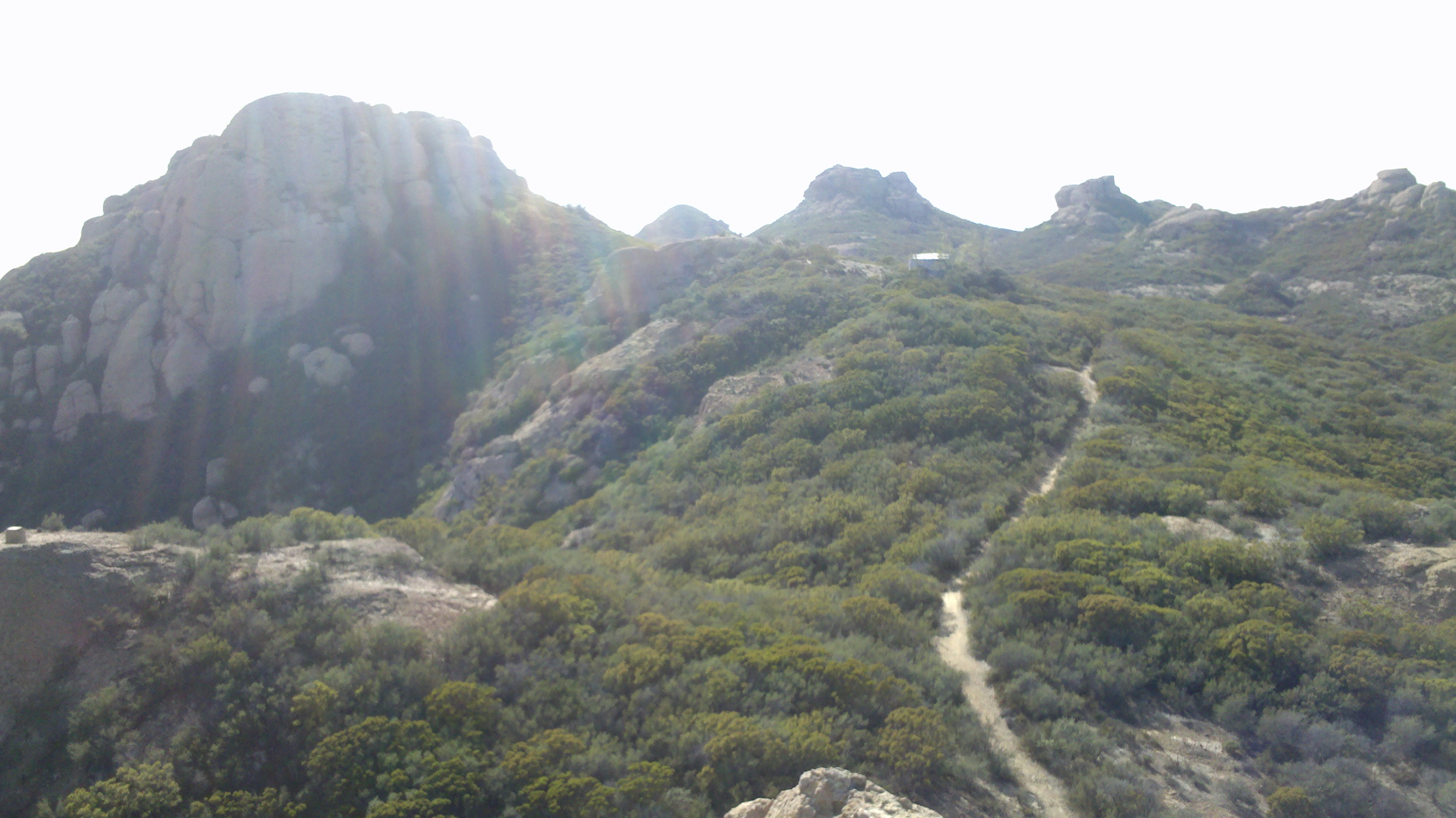
- Tri Peaks to the right, besides Exchange Peak to the left, Backbone Trail in the middle

Highest point
- Elevation: 917 m (3,009 ft)
- Prominence: 270 ft (82 m)
- Isolation: 1.05 mi (1.69 km)
- Coordinates: 34°07′20″N 118°56′59″W

Geography
- Location within California Location within the United States
- Location: Ventura County, California, U.S.
- Parent range: Santa Monica Mountains

Climbing
- Easiest route: Tri Peaks Trail

Tri Peaks is the second highest peak in the Santa Monica Mountains (after Sandstone Peak), with an elevation of 3,009 feet (917 m).

== See also ==
- Santa Monica Mountains
- Santa Monica Mountains National Recreation Area
- Backbone Trail
