= Santa Monica Mountains =

Mountain range in California, United States

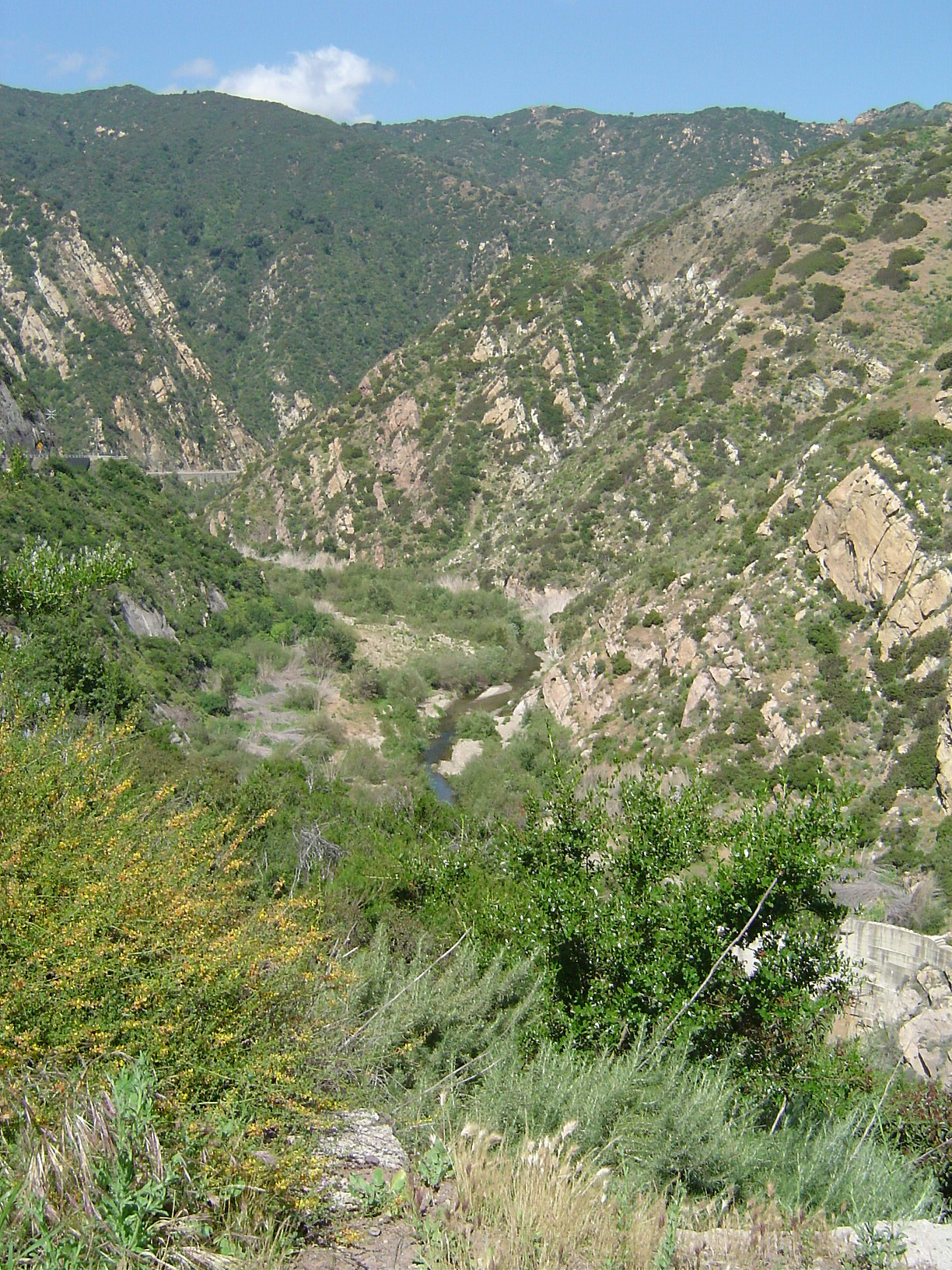
- Malibu Canyon (with the Rindge Dam at lower right) in the Santa Monica Mountains

Highest point
- Peak: Sandstone Peak
- Elevation: 3,111 ft (948 m)
- Coordinates: 34°7′13″N 118°55′55″W

Geography
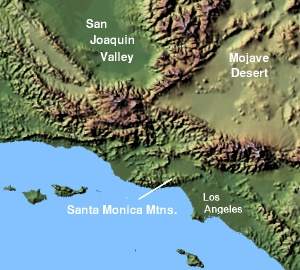
- Country: United States
- State: California
- Counties: Los Angeles; Ventura
- Range coordinates: 34°6′N 118°45′W
- Parent range: Transverse Ranges
- Borders on: Santa Susana Mountains; Simi Hills; Verdugo Mountains

The Santa Monica Mountains are a coastal mountain range in Southern California, next to the Pacific Ocean. They are part of the Transverse Ranges. The Santa Monica Mountains National Recreation Area protects nearly all of this mountain range, and extends beyond it in places. Because of its proximity to densely populated regions, it is one of the most visited natural areas in California.

== Geography ==
The range extends approximately 40 miles (64 km) east–west from the Hollywood Hills in Los Angeles to Point Mugu in Ventura County. The western mountains, separating the Conejo Valley from Malibu, suddenly end at Mugu Peak as the rugged, nearly impassible shoreline gives way to tidal lagoons and coastal sand dunes of the alluvial Oxnard Plain. The mountain range contributed to the isolation of this vast coastal plain before regular transportation routes reached western Ventura County. The eastern mountains form a barrier between the San Fernando Valley and the Los Angeles Basin, separating "the Valley" on the north and west-central Los Angeles on the south. The Santa Monica Mountains are parallel to the Santa Susana Mountains, which are located directly north of the mountains across the San Fernando Valley.

The range is of moderate height, with no particularly craggy or prominent peaks outside the Sandstone Peak and Boney Mountains area. While often rugged and wild, the range hosts a substantial amount of human activity and development. Houses, roads, businesses, and recreational centers are dotted throughout the Santa Monica Mountains.

A number of creeks in the Santa Monica Mountains are part of the Los Angeles River watershed. Beginning at the western end of the San Fernando Valley, the river runs to the north of the mountains. After passing between the range and the Verdugo Mountains it flows south around Elysian Park, defining the easternmost extent of the mountains.

=== Archeology ===
The Santa Monica Mountains have more than 1,000 archeology sites of significance, primarily from the Californian Native American cultures of the Tongva and Chumash people. The mountains were part of their regional homelands for over eight thousand years before the arrival of the Spanish. The Spanish mission system had a dramatic impact on their culture, and by 1831 their population had dropped from over 22,000 to under 3,000.

=== Geology ===
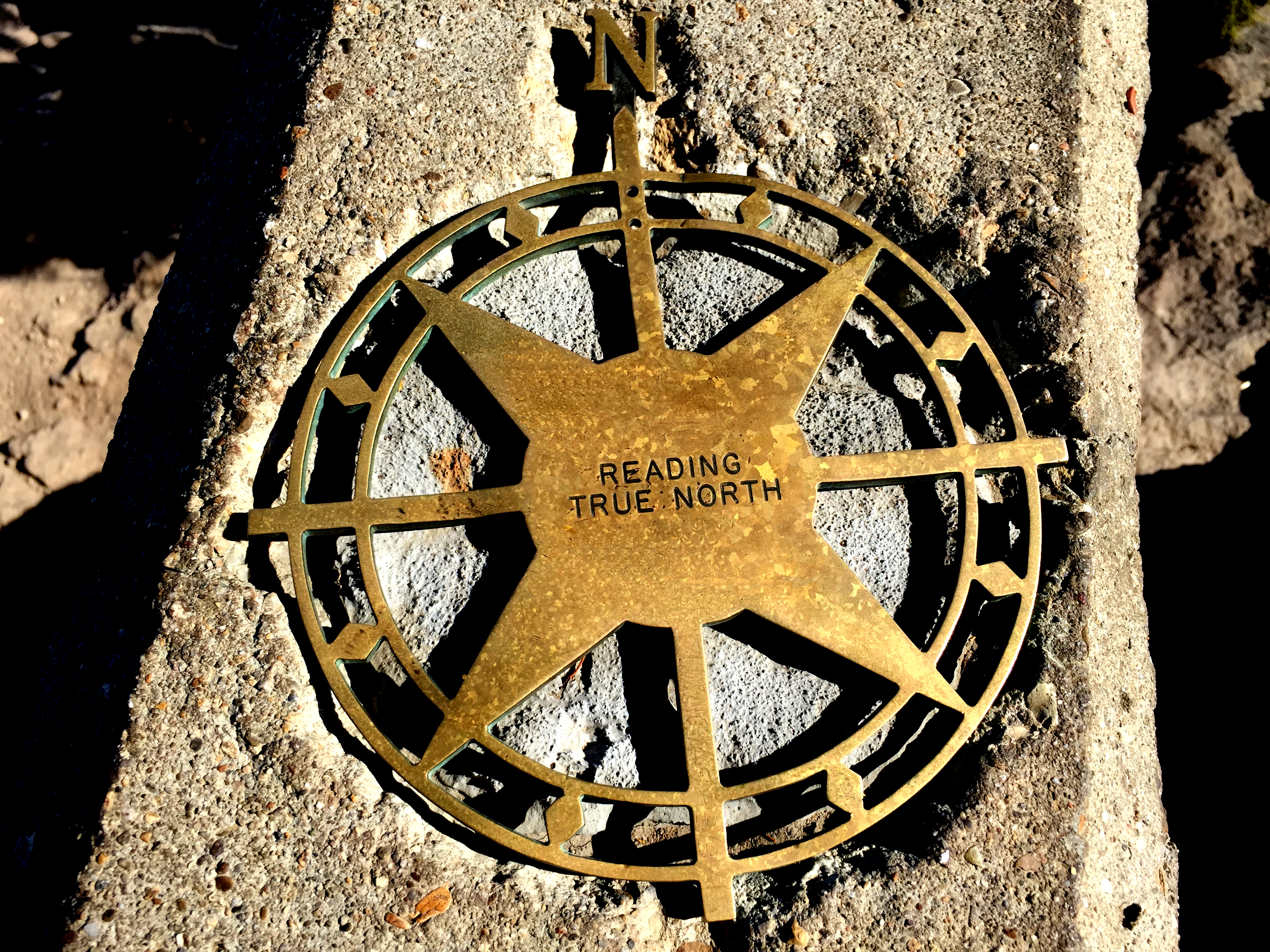
Azimuth Marker, Mount Allen (Sandstone Peak), Southern California, US

Geologists consider the northern Channel Islands to be a westward extension of the Santa Monicas into the Pacific Ocean. The range was created by repeated episodes of uplifting and submergence by the Raymond Fault, which created complex layers of sedimentary rock, some containing fossils of invertebrates and fish. Volcanic intrusions have been exposed, including the poorly named andesitic "Sandstone Peak", which is the highest point in the range at 3,111 feet (948 m). Malibu Creek, which eroded its own channel while the mountains were slowly uplifted, bisects the mountain range.

=== Climate ===
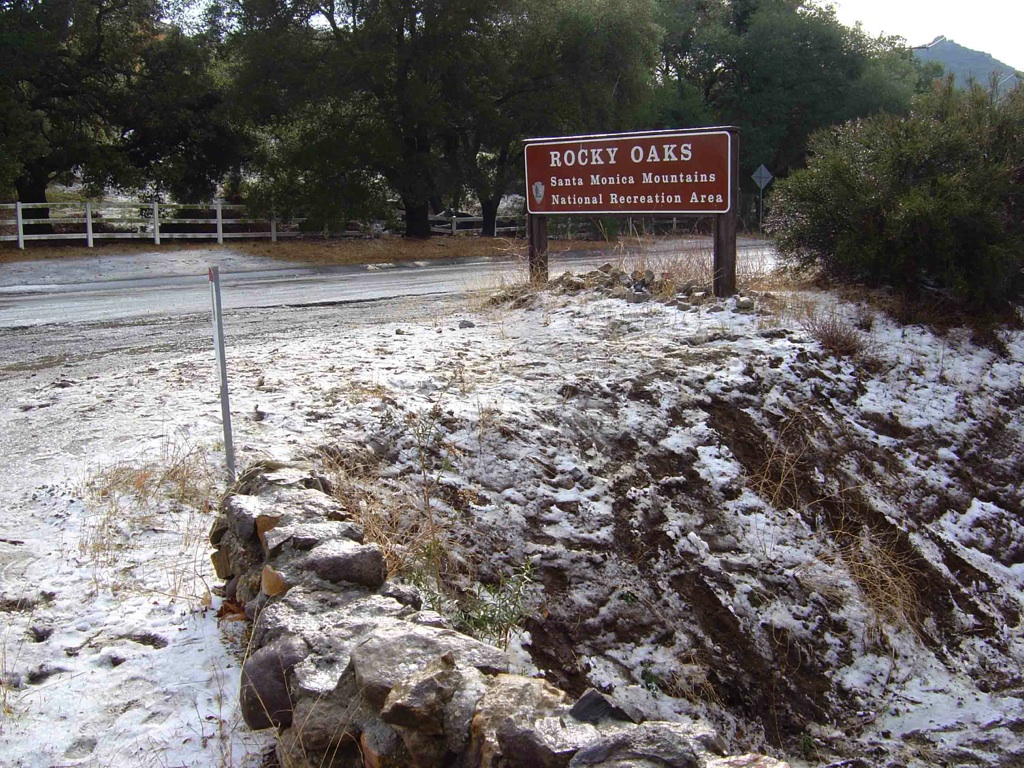
Snow in the Santa Monica Mountains in 2007

The Santa Monica Mountains have dry summers with frequent coastal fog on the ocean (south) side of the range and rainy, cooler winters. In the summer, the climate is quite dry (except for the coastal fog), which makes the range prone to wildfires, especially during dry "Santa Ana" wind events.

Snow is unusual in the Santa Monica Mountains, which are not as high as the nearby San Gabriel Mountains. The lower slopes of the range average between 15 and 20 inches (380 and 510 mm) of rain per year, while the higher slopes of the central and western Santa Monica Mountains average 22 to 27 inches (560 to 690 mm) of rain per year. The bulk of the rain falls between November and March. The higher rainfall in the central and western parts of the range results in more widespread woodlands (with oak, sycamore, walnut, bay laurel, alder and other trees) than the eastern part of the range, where trees are usually restricted to the stream courses.

On January 17, 2007, an unusually cold storm brought snow in the Santa Monica Mountains. The hills above Malibu picked up three inches (eight centimeters) of snow - the first measurable snow in fifty years. Snow was reported on Boney Peak in the winter of 2005; and in March 2006, snow also fell on the summit of the mountain. Snow also fell on the peak of Boney Peak in late December 2008. The latest recorded snowfall in the area was in February 2019, when an unusual amount of snowfall accumulated in low passes in the mountains. That storm system also brought rare snowfall to the Los Angeles area. Heavy graupel was recorded in Malibu Canyon on January 23, 2021. It accumulated as low as 400 feet in elevation.

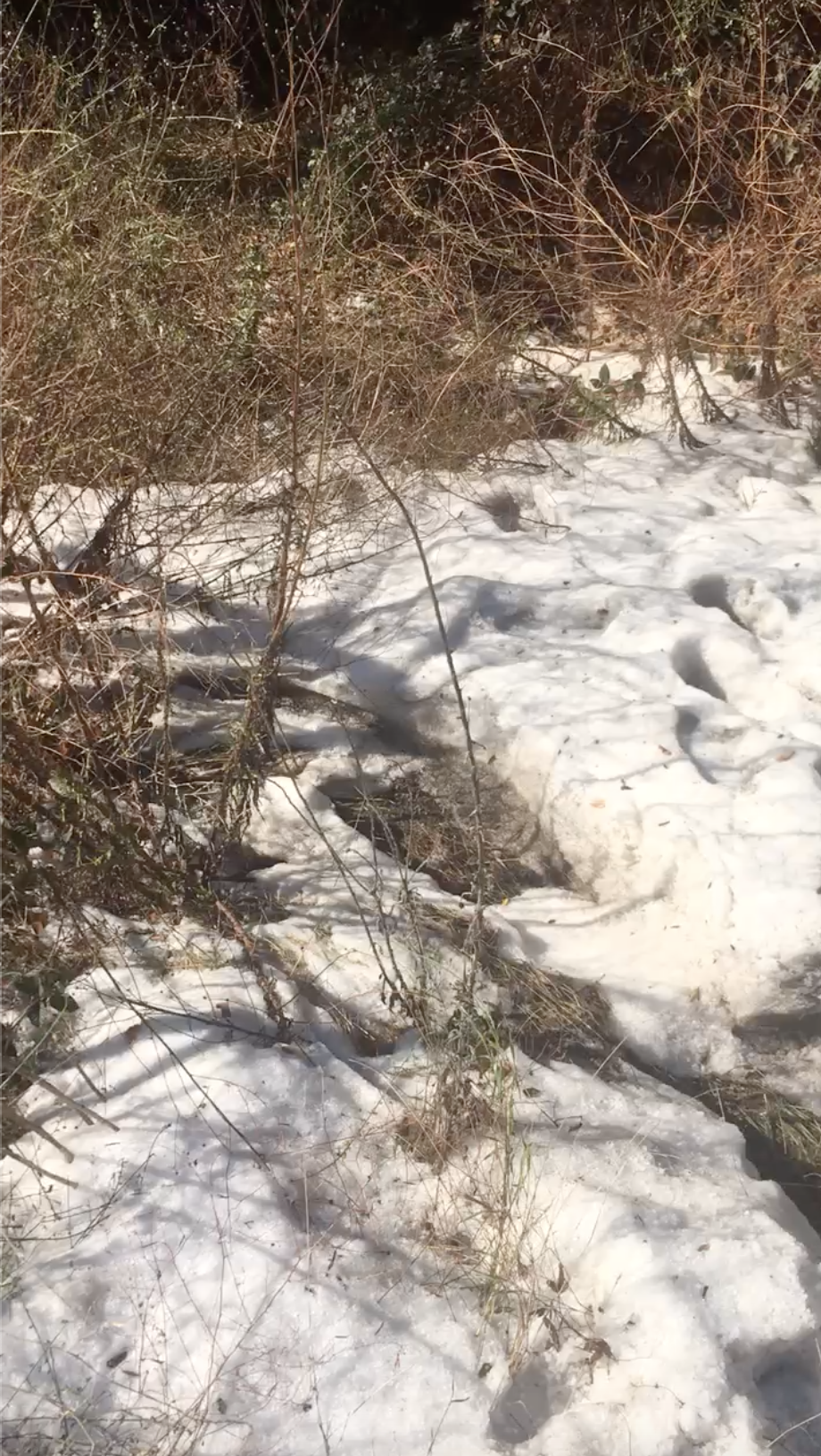
Deep graupel in Malibu Canyon in 2021

=== Wildfire ===
In the Santa Monica Mountains, when the fuels, seasonal drought, wind, and terrain combine with an ignition, a major wildfire occurs. These fires are large, wind-driven canopy fires that consume the above ground vegetation and often cause major property damage and home losses.

In 2018, the Woolsey Fire burned through 88% of the federal parkland resulting in trails being closed for months. The fire, which was three times larger than the biggest fire ever before in the mountains, burned over 40% of the natural area in the Santa Monicas. A restoration plan was developed to plant 100,000 trees, shrubs and grasses of 25 different species.

== Protected areas ==
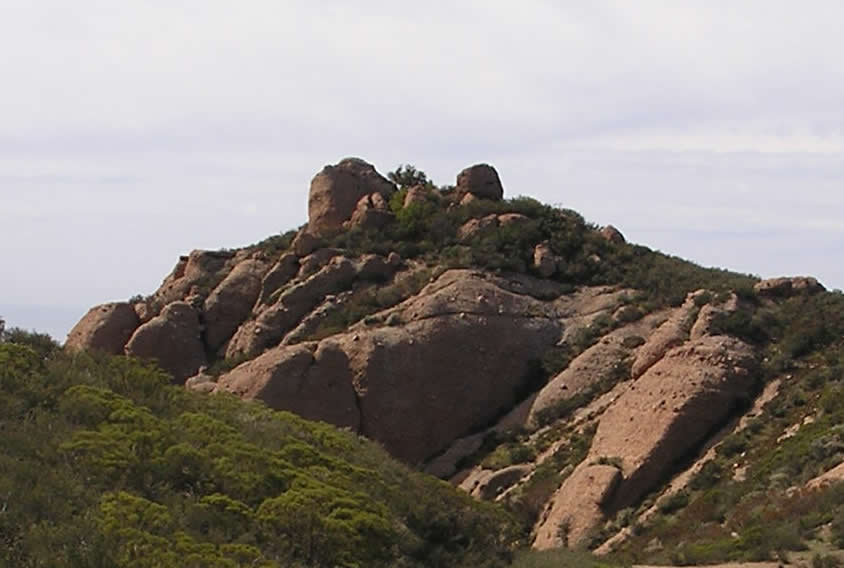
Boney Mountain is sacred to the Chumash people.

Much of the mountains are located within the Santa Monica Mountains National Recreation Area. Preservation of lands within the region are managed by the Santa Monica Mountains Conservancy, the National Park Service, the California State Parks, and County and Municipal agencies. The Santa Monica Mountains face pressure from local populations as a desirable residential area, and in the parks as a recreational retreat and wild place that's increasingly rare in urban Los Angeles. In 2014 the California Coastal Commission and the Los Angeles County Board of Supervisors approved the Santa Monica Mountains Local Coastal Program, a land-use plan that will distinguish between the private lands that need strict protection and property that could be developed in strict conformance with this detailed plan.

=== Regional parks ===
Over twenty individual state and municipal parks are in the Santa Monica Mountains, including: Topanga State Park, Leo Carrillo State Park, Malibu Creek State Park, Point Mugu State Park, Will Rogers State Historic Park, Point Dume State Beach, Griffith Park, Marvin Braude Mulholland Gateway Park, Charmlee Wilderness Park, Franklin Canyon Park, Runyon Canyon Park, King Gillette Ranch Park, and Paramount Ranch Park.

=== Satwiwa ===
The Satwiwa Native American Indian Culture Center in Newbury Park, California is located within the Santa Monica Mountains National Recreation Area. The area was purchased by the U.S. National Park Service in 1980. The Rosewood Trail near Stagecoach Inn, which leads to Angel Vista is an access point in Newbury Park.

=== Griffith and Elysian Parks ===
At the eastern end of the Santa Monica Mountains are Griffith Park and Elysian Park. Griffith Park is separated from the rest of the Santa Monica Mountains to the west by the Cahuenga Pass, over which the 101 Freeway (also called the Hollywood Freeway) passes from the San Fernando Valley into Hollywood. Elysian Park is in the easternmost part of the mountains and is bordered by the Los Angeles River to the east and Downtown Los Angeles nearby to the south.

=== Rim of the Valley Trail ===
The Rim of the Valley Trail is a plan in progress for accessing and connecting the parkland and recreational areas of the mountains surrounding the Conejo, San Fernando, Simi, and Crescenta Valleys. With trailheads in the mountains and valleys, it would link them through existing and new: walking, hiking, equestrian, and mountain biking trails; parklands; and conservation easements. The Rim of the Valley project also has the goal to protect flora and fauna habitats and wildlife corridors between the Santa Monica Mountains and the inland ranges.

== Flora and fauna ==
=== Fauna ===
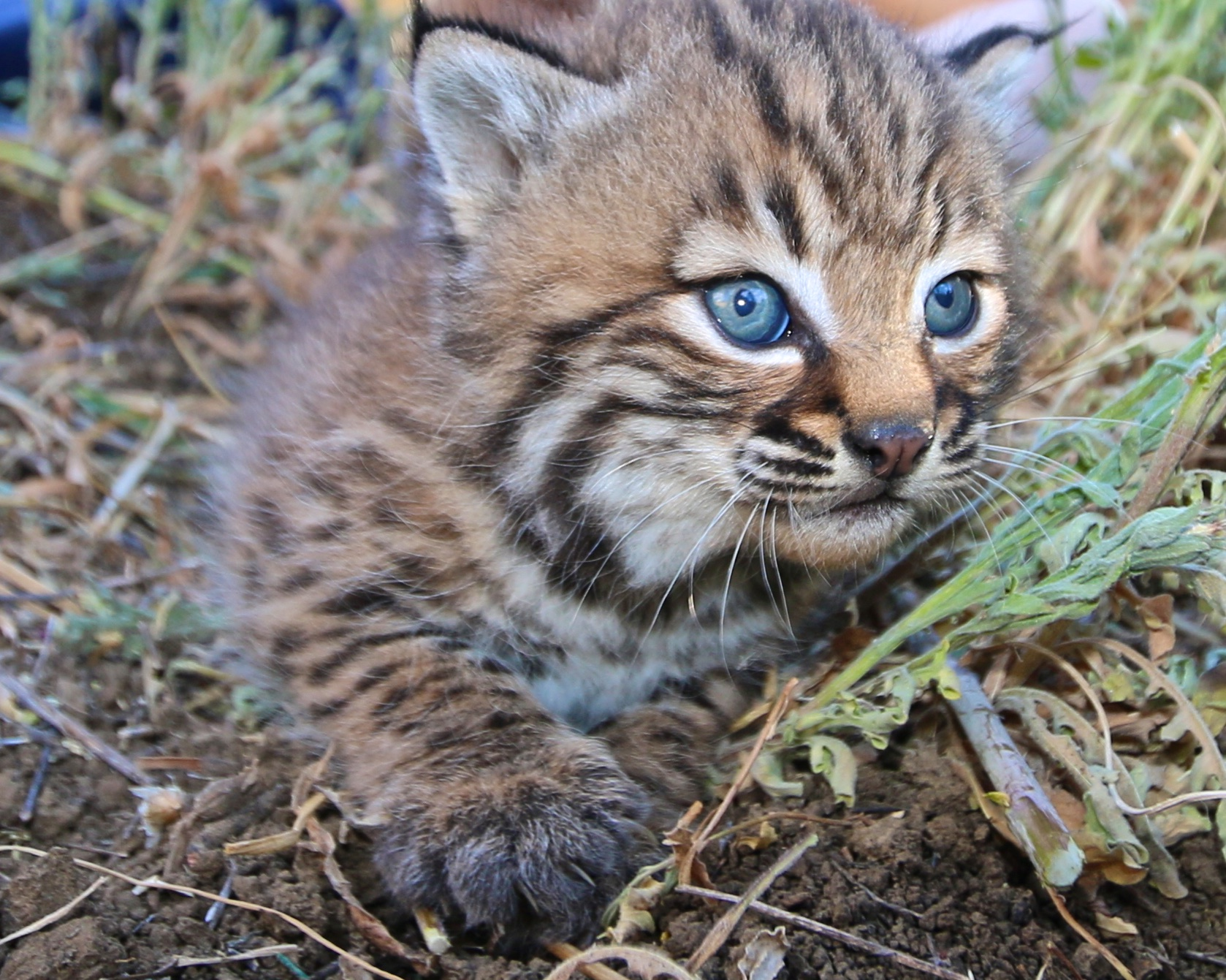
Bobcat kitten 327, SMMNRA

The range is host to a variety of wildlife. Common mammals in the range include mule deer, coyotes, bobcats, striped skunks, raccoons, several native bat species, brush rabbits, and many rodents including California voles, western gray squirrels, dusky-footed and desert woodrats, western harvest and California pocket mice, Botta's pocket gophers, and pacific kangaroo rats.

The mountain lion population is challenged because the Santa Monica Mountains are isolated and not large enough for weaned cubs to find their own territory. The primary cause of the decline is due to a combination of traffic-related mortality, anti-coagulants ingested from human poisoned prey, and attacks by other, more dominant mountain lions. The Wallis Annenberg Wildlife Crossing will bridge the Ventura Freeway which acts as a barrier in the wildlife corridor between the Simi Hills to the north and the Santa Monica Mountains to the south. The National Park Service has recorded a dozen mountain lions struck and killed by motorists on this section of freeway since they began tracking them in 2002, with most mountain lions turning back without attempting to cross, and only one who was repeatedly able to safely cross. In 2020, wildlife biologists found the first evidence of physical abnormalities in the isolated population, most likely due to a lack of genetic diversity.

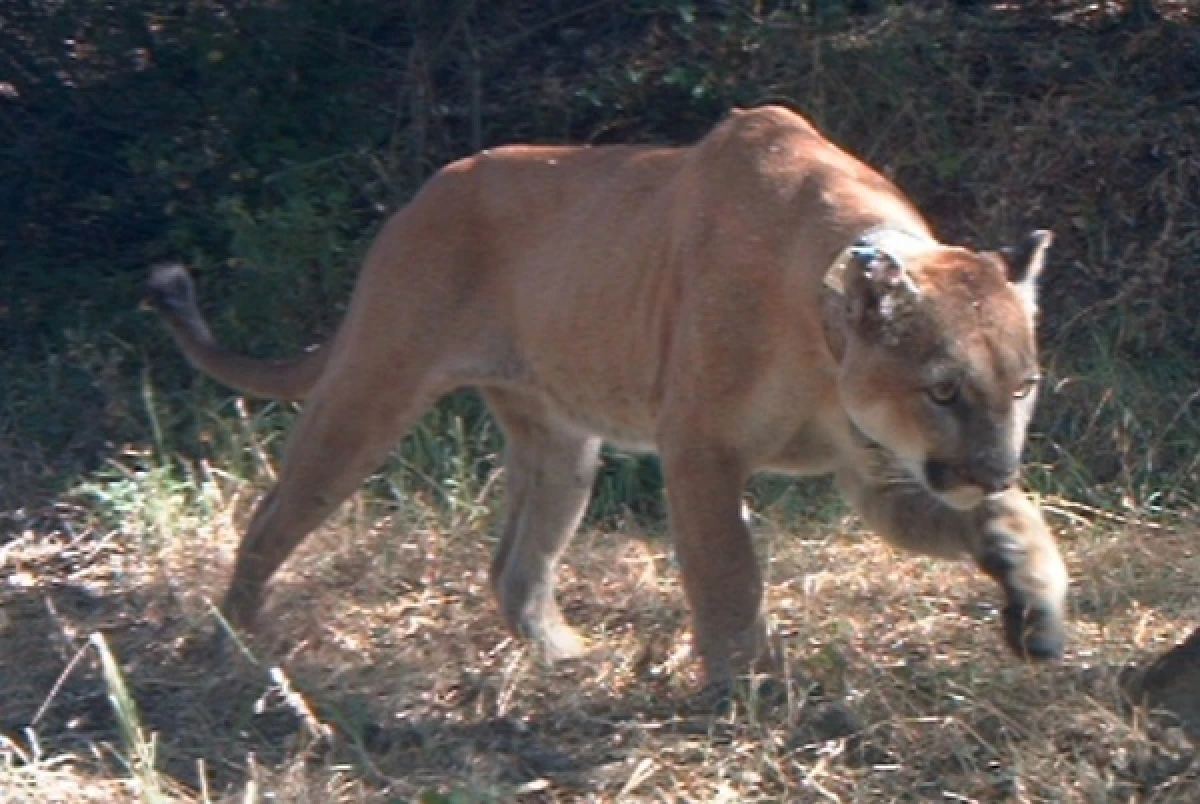
P-12

Since 2002, the National Park Service has tracked more than 100 mountain lions in the Santa Monica Mountains and other nearby ranges. P-22 resided in Griffith Park in the eastern end of the Santa Monica Mountains until his death in 2022. His father, P-1, was the dominant male for almost all of the rest of the range, until he was replaced by P-12 and P-27, P-12 later being replaced by P-45. Other mountain lions, including P-2, P-64, and many others, have lived in the range as well.

The National Park Service also tracks bobcats and black bears in the Santa Monica Mountains. More than 350 bobcats have been tracked since 1996, as have two bears: BB-12 and Yellow 2291. These bears along with Yellow 2291's three offspring are the only bears documented in the Santa Monica Mountains in more than twenty years.

Over 380 native bird species call the Santa Monica Mountains home. Abundant native song birds species include the Bushtit, California Scrub Jay, House Finch, Lesser Goldfinch, Cliff Swallow, Red-winged Blackbird, Oak Titmouse, Song Sparrow, California Towhee, Spotted Towhee, House Wren, and Black Phoebe. Red-Tailed Hawks, Sharp-shinned Hawks, Red-shouldered Hawks, Northern Harriers, American Kestrels, Great Horned Owls, and Western Screech-Owls are among common raptors in the area. White-tailed kites, Bald Eagles, Golden Eagles, and Burrowing Owls have also been sighted. In addition to these residential species, many bird species pass through the Santa Monica Mountains as they travel along the Pacific Flyway including Brown Pelicans, Rufous Hummingbirds, Canada Geese, Bonaparte's Gulls, and Elegant Terns.

Native fish found in the Santa Monica Mountains include tidewater gobies, arroyo chub, and pacific lamprey. Additionally, Malibu creek is home to the southern steelhead trout, which is an endangered species.

Snakes are common but only occasionally seen: the Southern Pacific rattlesnake (the only venomous species), mountain kingsnake, California kingsnake, gopher snake, and garter snake. The mountains are also home to the western fence lizard and the coastal whiptail. The population of red-legged frogs is small and isolated, and was impacted by the Woolsey Fire that swept through the area in November 2018.

=== Flora ===
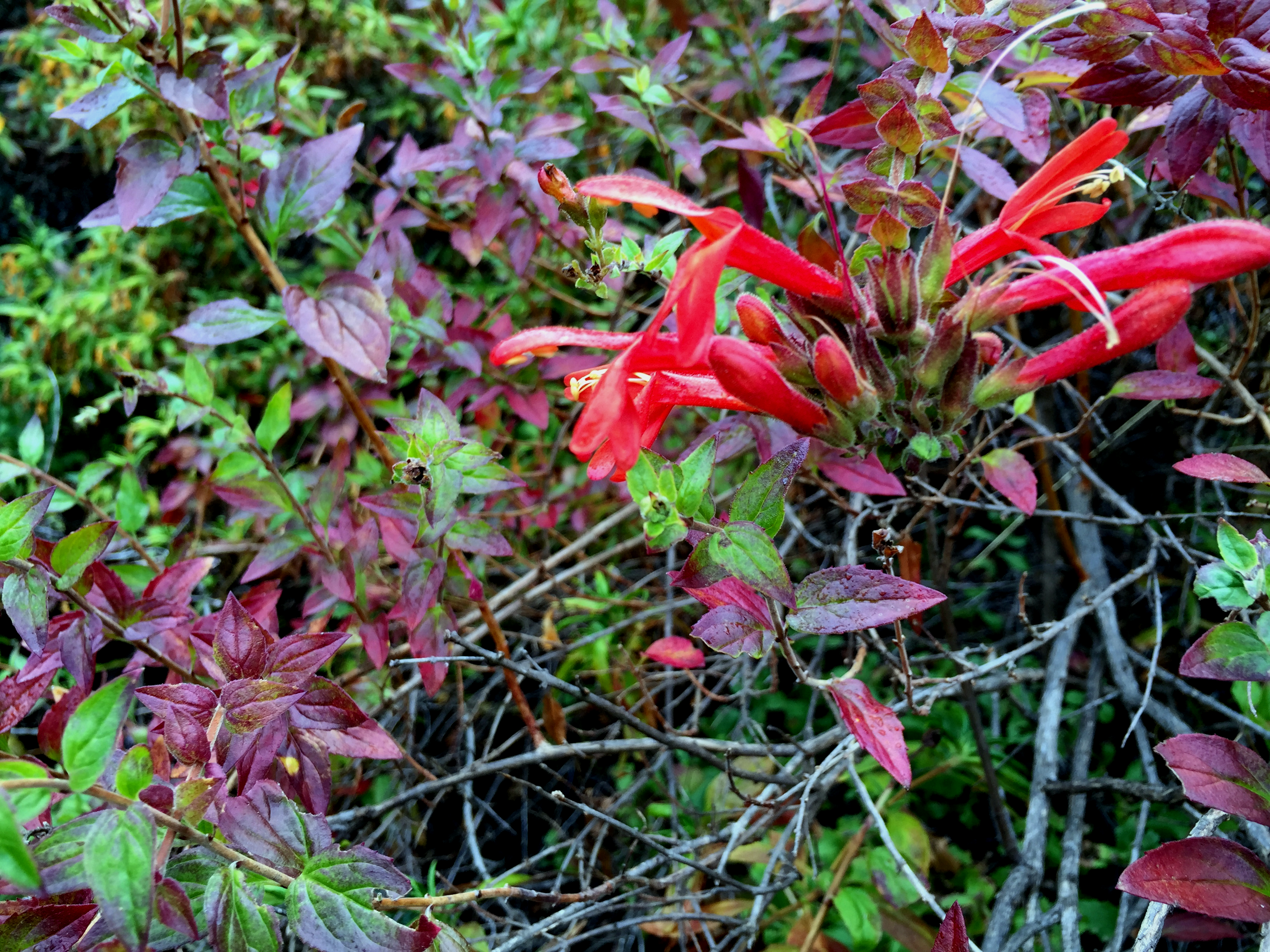
Heart leaf penstemon, Keckiella cordifolia, along the Backbone Trail in the Santa Monica Mountains

The Santa Monica Mountains are in the California chaparral and woodlands ecoregion, and includes the California oak woodland and southern coastal sage scrub plant community, and are covered by hundreds of local plant species, some of which are very rare or endemic, and others which are widespread and have become popular horticultural ornamentals. Dudleya verityi is a rare species of succulent plant known by the common name "Verity's liveforever". This species is endemic to Ventura County and is found only on one edge of the Santa Monica Mountains, where it occurs in coastal sage scrub habitat. The most common trees in the mountains are oak and sycamore. The California black walnut, endemic to California, grows on the northern side of the mountains in the Valley and Griffith Park. Other species include willow and alder (along stream courses) and bay laurel. Several species of ferns (including large sword ferns) are found in wetter, shady areas throughout the range, especially near streams.

=== Invasive species ===
Many invasive weeds have colonized the mountain habitats which can bring about significant changes in the ecosystems by altering the native plant communities and the processes that support them. These non-native plants include annual Mediterranean grasses, Spanish broom (Genista juncea), and yellow starthistle (Centaurea solstitialis). In creekside riparian habitats are found plants such as giant cane (Arundo donax), German ivy (Delairea odorata), blue periwinkle (Vinca major), and ivy (Hedera spp.).

More frequent fires have created conditions favorable to invasive plants. The 2018 Woolsey Fire burned through 88% of the federal parkland. The fire, which was three times larger than the biggest fire ever before in the mountains, burned over 40% of the natural area in the Santa Monicas. The fire created a challenge to native plants as black mustard with bright yellow flowers quickly established itself as a wet winter followed the fire. The mustard plants will also provide fuel for the next fires.

The New Zealand mud snail is an invasive species found in the Santa Monica Mountains, that pose a serious threat to native species, complicating efforts to improve stream-water quality for the endangered steelhead. Within a period of four years, the snails expanded from their first known population in Medea Creek in Agoura Hills to nearly 30 other stream sites. Researchers at the Santa Monica Bay Restoration Commission believe the snails' expansion may have been expedited after the mollusks traveled from stream to stream on the gear of contractors and volunteers.

== Roads and access ==
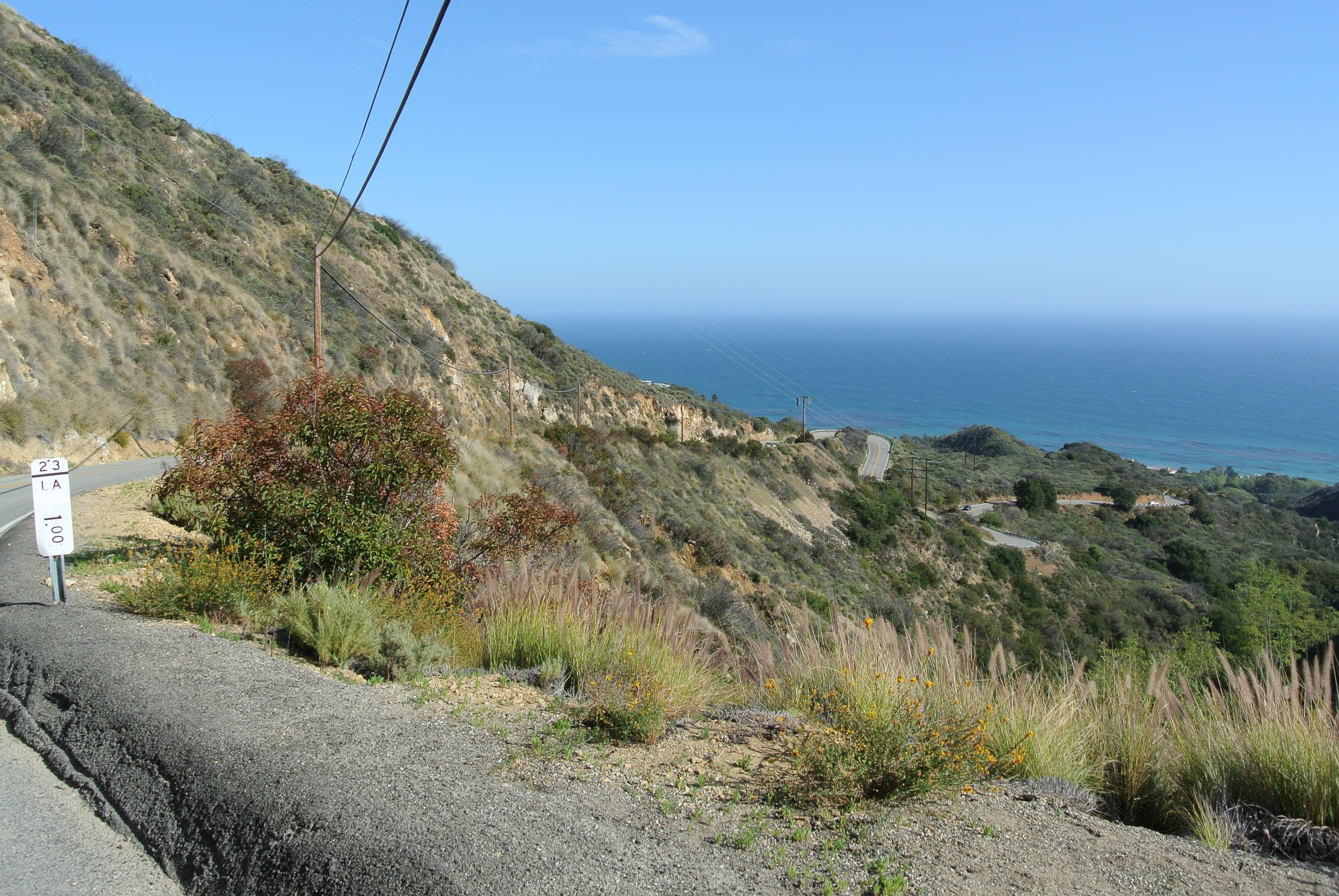
First mile of CA 23 and southern coastal scrub

Cahuenga Pass, present-day site of U.S. Route 101, is the easiest pass through the range connecting the Los Angeles Basin to the San Fernando Valley. In the 1800s, two battles were fought there, and the Treaty of Cahuenga was signed nearby. In Hollywood's heyday, movie studios were found clustered on both sides of the highway.

Sepulveda Pass is the main north–south pass to the west, connecting the Westside to Sherman Oaks via the San Diego Freeway (I-405) and Sepulveda Boulevard.

Other passes between the Sepulveda and Cahuenga passes include: Laurel Canyon Boulevard, Coldwater Canyon Avenue, and Beverly Glen Boulevard. West of the Sepulveda Pass are Topanga Canyon Boulevard (SR 27), Malibu Canyon Road, Kanan Road/Kanan Dume Road, and Decker Canyon Road.

Mulholland Drive runs much of the length of the Santa Monica Mountains, from Cahuenga Pass to Woodland Hills, although it is not open to motor vehicles west of Encino. The Mulholland Highway runs from Woodland Hills to Sequit Point at the Pacific Ocean.

=== Area communities ===
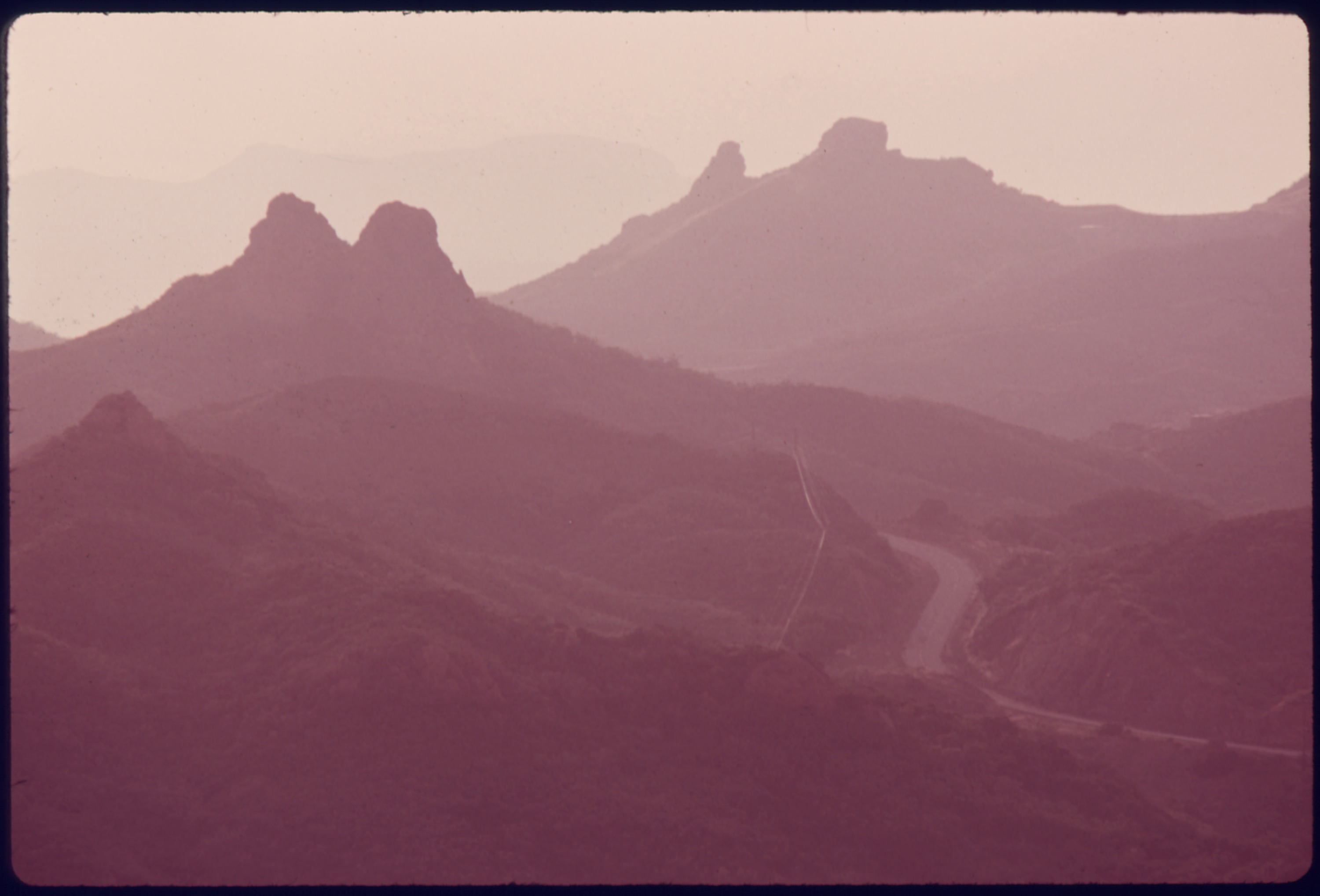
Haze in the Santa Monica Mountains near the west edge of Los Angeles County, 1975. Photo by Charles O'Rear

The eastern end of the range, located in the City of Los Angeles, is more intensively developed than the western end. The city of Malibu runs between the coast and the leading mountain ridge, from Topanga Canyon in the east to Leo Carrillo State Park in the west.

Communities along the north slope of the mountains include (from east to west):

- the Los Angeles communities of:
  - the unincorporated area of Universal City
  - Studio City
  - Sherman Oaks
  - Encino
  - Tarzana
  - Woodland Hills
  - West Hills
- Calabasas
- Bell Canyon
- Agoura Hills
- Westlake Village
- Thousand Oaks
- Newbury Park

Communities along the south slope of the mountains include (from east to west):

- the Los Angeles communities of:
  - Los Feliz
  - Hollywood Hills
  - Bel-Air
  - Benedict Canyon
  - Brentwood
  - Pacific Palisades
- Beverly Hills
- Santa Monica
- the unincorporated community of Topanga
- Malibu
- Solromar

== Named peaks ==
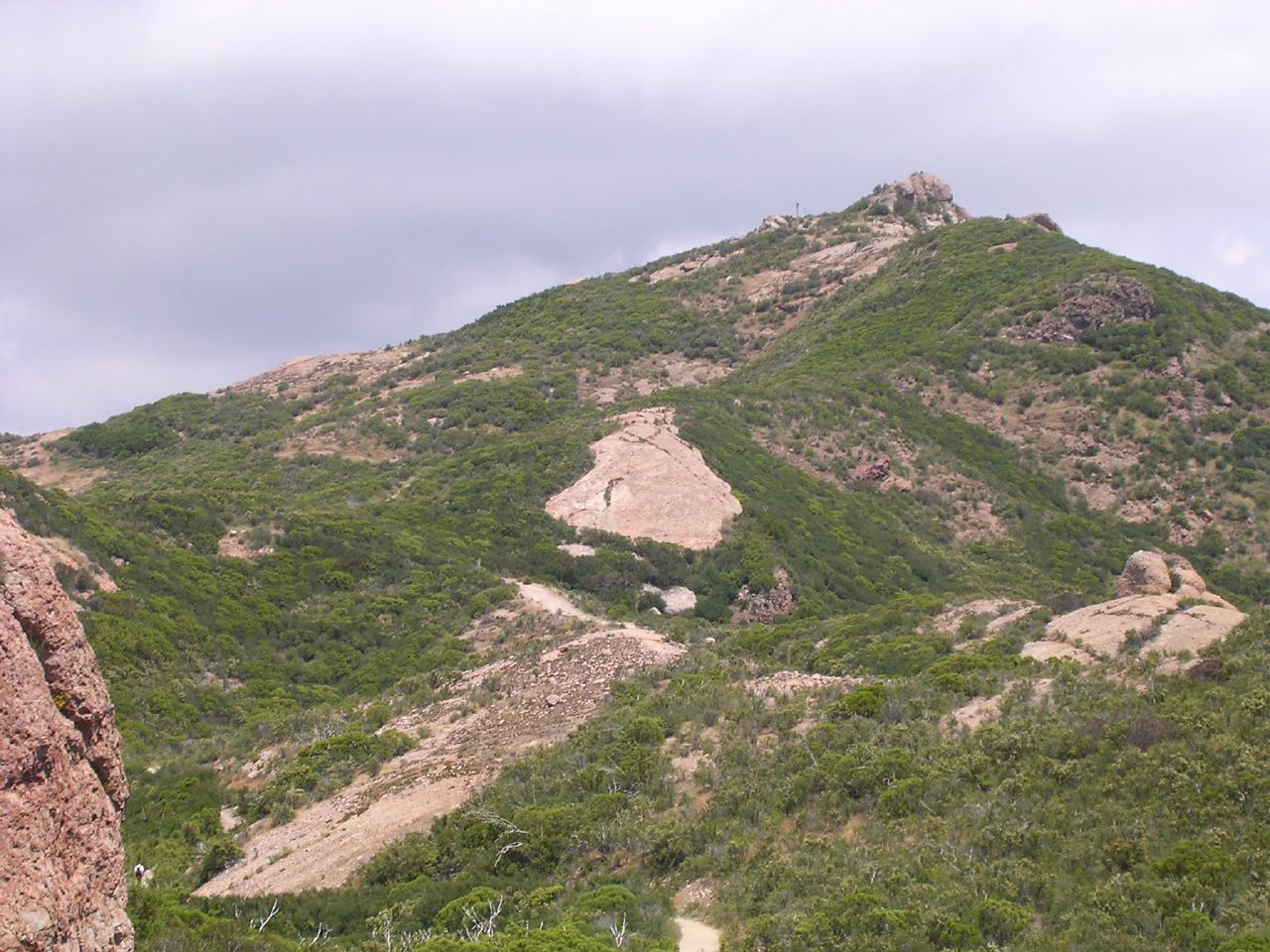
Sandstone Peak

Named peaks in the Santa Monica Mountains
Peak	Height		Notes
	US	SI	
Sandstone Peak	3111 ft	948 m	also known as Mount Allen, rising nearly a kilometer high
Tri-Peaks	3010 ft	917 m	
Exchange Peak	2950 ft	899 m	
Conejo Peak	2854 ft	870 m	
Boney Peak	2825 ft	861 m	
Castro Peak	2824 ft	861 m	highest peak in the eastern end of the range
Saddle Peak	2805 ft	855 m	
Calabasas Peak	2165 ft	660 m	
Temescal Peak	2126 ft	648 m	
Ballard Mountain	2,039 ft	631 m	recognizes John Ballard, an early black pioneer
San Vicente Mountain	1965 ft	599 m	former site of a Nike missile base, now a Cold War park
Clarks Peak	1965 ft	599 m	
Mesa Peak	1844 ft	562 m	
Cahuenga Peak	1820 ft	555 m	
Brents Mountain	1713 ft	522 m	
Mount Lee	1640 ft	500 m	the Hollywood Sign is on the south slope, at exactly half a kilometer high
Mount Hollywood	1625 ft	495 m	in Griffith Park; Griffith Observatory is on the south slope
Mount Chapel	1622 ft	494 m	
Mount Bell	1587 ft	484 m	
La Jolla Peak	1567 ft	478 m	
Laguna Peak	1457 ft	444 m	the instrumentation capping this peak serves Naval Base Ventura County below
Mugu Peak	1266 ft	386 m	the westernmost peak in the range, rising directly from the beach

== Adjacent ranges ==
- Chalk Hills (in Woodland Hills)
- San Gabriel Mountains
- Santa Susana Mountains
- Simi Hills
- Verdugo Mountains

== See also ==
- 1978 Agoura-Malibu firestorm
- Canyon Fire, in October 2007
- Chumash people
- Mulholland Highway
- Santa Monica Mountains National Recreation Area
- Palisades Fire (2025)
- Parks in the Santa Monica Mountains
- Index: Natural history of the Santa Monica Mountains
