= Calabasas Peak =

Mountain in Calabasas, California

- Location within California

Highest point
- Elevation: 2,155 ft (657 m)
- Coordinates: 34°06′43″N 118°39′09″W

Geography
- Location: Calabasas, California
- Parent range: Santa Monica Mountains

Calabasas Peak is a mountain located in the Santa Monica Mountains in the city of Calabasas, California. The summit is accessible via the Calabasas Peak Motorway, a wide trail maintained by the Santa Monica Mountains Conservancy. The Calabasas Peak Motorway is accessible from Old Topanga Canyon Road and Stunt Road trailheads, as well as an informal path on a trailhead on Mulholland Highway.

The peak is the highest point in a wide ascent that runs parallel to Mulholland Highway, which is a part of the larger Santa Monica Mountains. The mountain is vegetated by dwarf forest shrubbery and chaparral plants around the mountainside and ascending trail, but is composed of large rock formations and sand at the peak. Certain wildlife and animals are a common sight around the mountain range, including deer, rattlesnakes, and coyotes.

There is a bench at the peak.

The mountain and trail was partially burned during the 2016 Old Fires in Calabasas, and again during the 2018 Woolsey Fire. After these fires, the mountainside vegetation and wildlife quickly returned, due to the region's natural acclimation to wildfires.

== Climate ==
Calabasas Peak's climate is colder than Calabasas because of its elevation, being about 5 degrees cooler in the winter, and about 5-10 degrees cooler in the summer. However, though Calabasas Peak is colder than Calabasas, both areas do not experience any kind of snow, except on very rare occasions.

Climate data for Calabasas Peak, California
Month	Jan	Feb	Mar	Apr	May	Jun	Jul	Aug	Sep	Oct	Nov	Dec	Year
Mean daily maximum °F (°C)	58 (14)	58 (14)	62 (17)	65 (18)	68 (20)	72 (22)	77 (25)	79 (26)	77 (25)	71 (22)	64 (18)	57 (14)	67 (20)
Mean daily minimum °F (°C)	39 (4)	40 (4)	43 (6)	45 (7)	48 (9)	52 (11)	57 (14)	59 (15)	57 (14)	51 (11)	44 (7)	39 (4)	48 (9)
Source: Meteoblue.com "Averages for Calabasas Peak" .

== See also ==
- List of mountain peaks of California
- Named peaks in the Santa Monica Mountains
