= Will Rogers State Historic Park =

State park in Los Angeles County, California

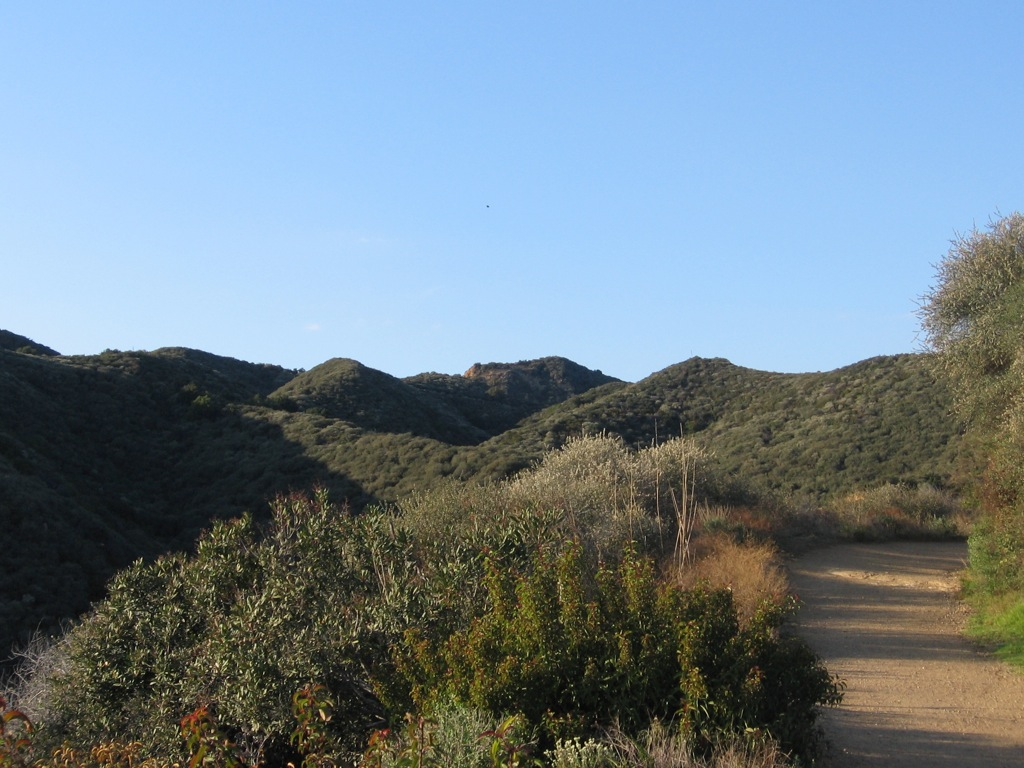
- Hiking trail surrounding the park

- Location within the Los Angeles metropolitan area Location within California Location within the United States
- Type: State Park
- Location: Santa Monica Mountains
- Nearest city: Los Angeles, California
- Coordinates: 34°03′22″N 118°30′44″W
- Area: 186 acres (75 ha)
- Created: 1944
- Operator: California State Parks
- Status: Open with limited access.
- Website: California State Parks: Will Rogers Historic Park
- Will Rogers House
- U.S. National Register of Historic Places
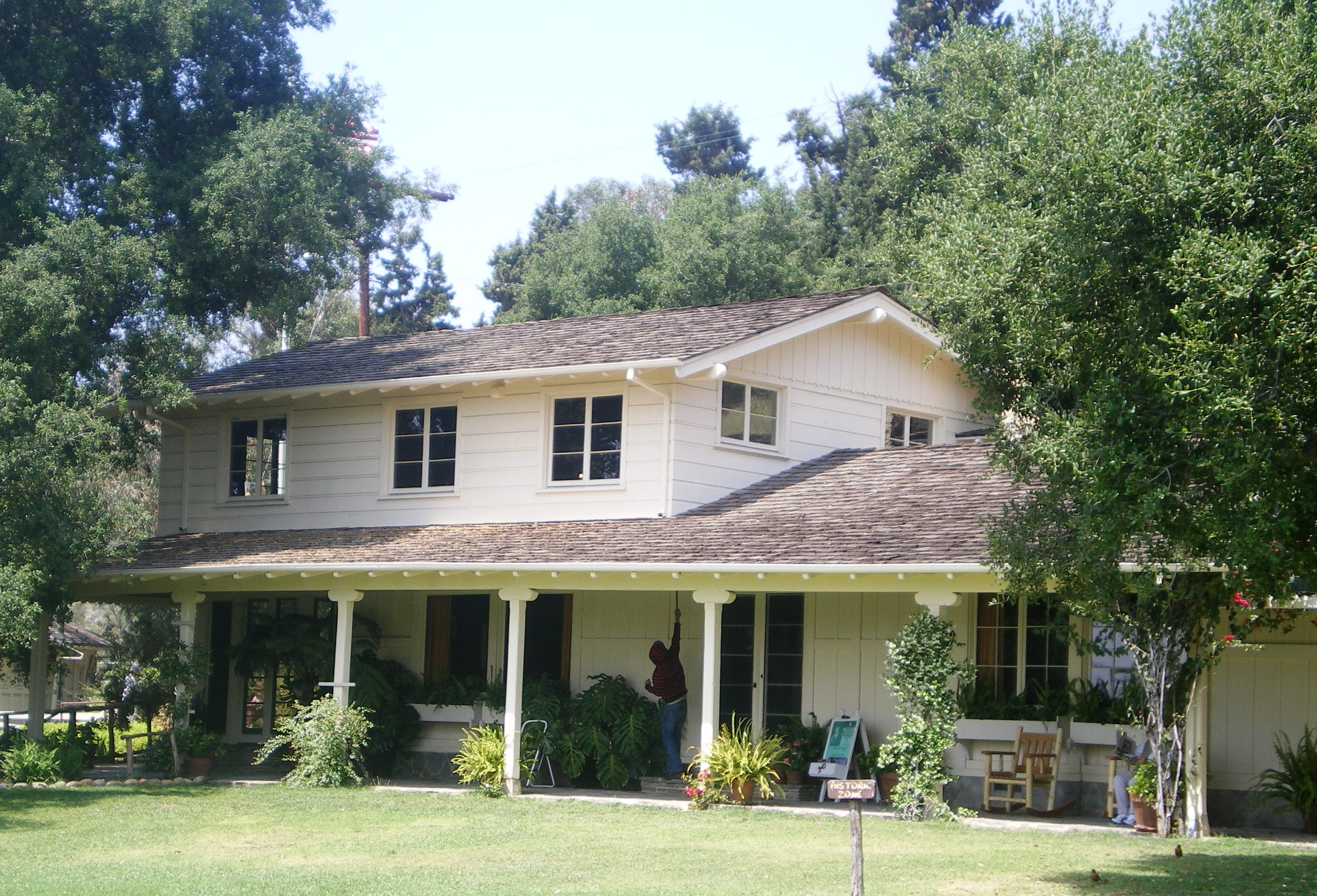
- Location: 1501 Will Rogers State Park Road; Los Angeles, California
- NRHP reference No.: 71000149
- Added to NRHP: February 24, 1971

Will Rogers State Historic Park is a California State Historic Park in the Santa Monica Mountains, in the Pacific Palisades area of Los Angeles. The 186-acre (75 ha) park was established in 1944 to preserve the estate of American humorist Will Rogers, including his ranch and the surrounding countryside. The ranch house was listed on the National Register of Historic Places in 1971. The ranch house, main stables, and other side structures were destroyed in the 2025 Palisades Wildfire, although the original garage/visitor center, smaller outbuildings, and several dozen smaller art and personal artifacts were saved from the inferno.

== Geography ==
Rogers built his ranch, where he lived with his wife Betty and their three children, Will Jr., Mary and James, in what is now the Los Angeles neighborhood of Pacific Palisades, The 31-room ranch house, which included 11 baths and seven fireplaces, was surrounded by a stable, corrals, riding ring, roping arena, golf course, polo field—and riding and hiking trails that gave visitors views of the ranch and the surrounding countryside 186 acres (75 ha). The ranch became a State Park in 1944 after the death of Mrs. Rogers, and the house was listed on the National Register of Historic Places in 1971.

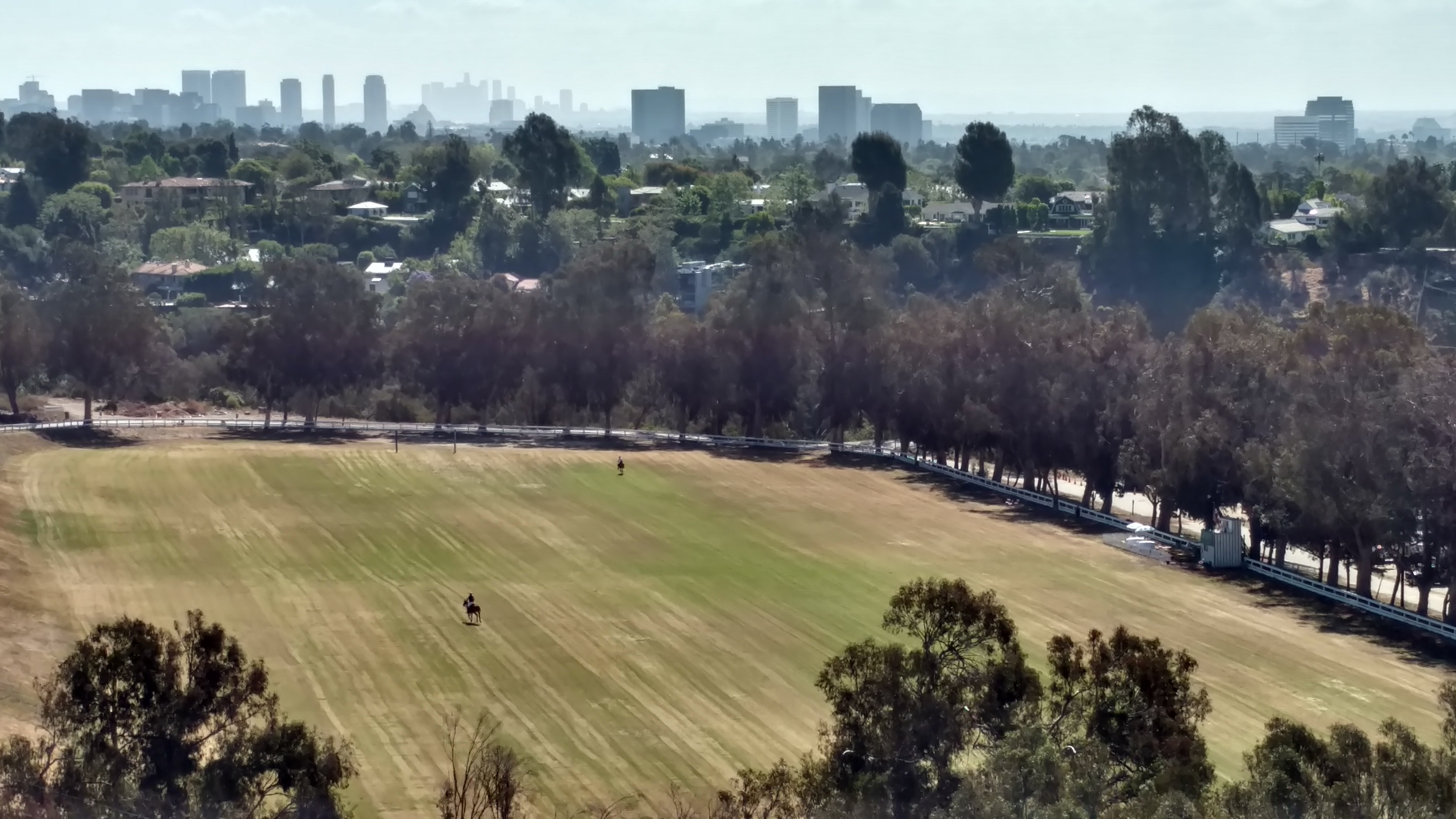
Polo field and downtown Los Angeles from the park

Beyond the ranch and the stables are the trails that lead to views of the countryside around the park. Since Will Rogers State Historic Park is on the tip of the Santa Monica Mountains, the trails have vistas of both the sea and the mountains. Visitors can hike to Inspiration Point, take the Rogers trail around the perimeter of the park or continue on into Topanga State Park via the Backbone Trail System.

== History ==
Beyond the Rogers' home, the ranch reflects Will Rogers' roots in horsemanship, starting with the polo field, which is the first thing the visitor sees when looking south from the parking area. The field is the only outdoor polo field in Los Angeles County, and the only field that is regulation size. The ranch has been in many movies and television shows, including Star Trek IV, in which it stood in for Golden Gate Park. The polo field features a gentle slope that forms an area for viewing the polo action. Up from the parking area are the ranch buildings, including the visitor center, which once was the Rogers' garage and ranch guest house. The visitor center features a film on the life of Will Rogers, photo mural displays, and literature regarding the Rogers family and their legacy reflected in the park.

The ranch buildings and grounds were maintained as they were when the Rogers family lived there in the late 1920s and 1930s. The living room of the main ranch house included a collection of Native American rugs and baskets, and several original Western art works by Charles M. Russell and Ed Borein. It also featured a porch swing in the center of the room and a mounted calf, which was given to Will Rogers to encourage him to rope the calf instead of his friends. The north wing of the house, also furnished in period, original family furnishings, contained the family bedrooms, Rogers' study, and the family parlor/sunroom.

Since 2006, the nature and historic interpretive goals of WRSHP under California State Parks operation have been amplified by stewardship and fundraising from the non-profit Will Rogers Ranch Foundation (WRRF). The WRRF board includes direct legacy lineage with the Rogers family — currently Will's great-granddaughter, Jennifer Rogers Etcheverry.

=== Renovations 2002-2006 ===
California State Parks completed a major renovation of the ranch house in 2002–2006. The project included reconstruction of flagstone areas that surrounded the house, seismic safety work, replacement of electrical systems and installation of a new heating and air conditioning system. The house reopened to the public in March 2006.

=== Proposed closure in 2008 ===
Will Rogers State Historic Park was one of the 48 California state parks proposed for closure in January 2008 by California's Governor Arnold Schwarzenegger as part of a deficit reduction program.

=== 2025 Palisades fire ===
On January 8, 2025, the ranch house and other structures were destroyed in the Palisades Wildfire, with the surrounding ranch also being severely damaged. State Parks was able to evacuate horses owned by a vendor, and some of the artwork and artifacts that were in the ranch house were saved. Only 0.5% of the park grounds were left unscathed during the fire. The park partially reopened in November 2025, with its recreational facilities and half of the trails open. The original ranch house was expected to take several years to rebuild, in part because of stringent guidelines set when the California government took over the park in 1944.

== Gallery ==
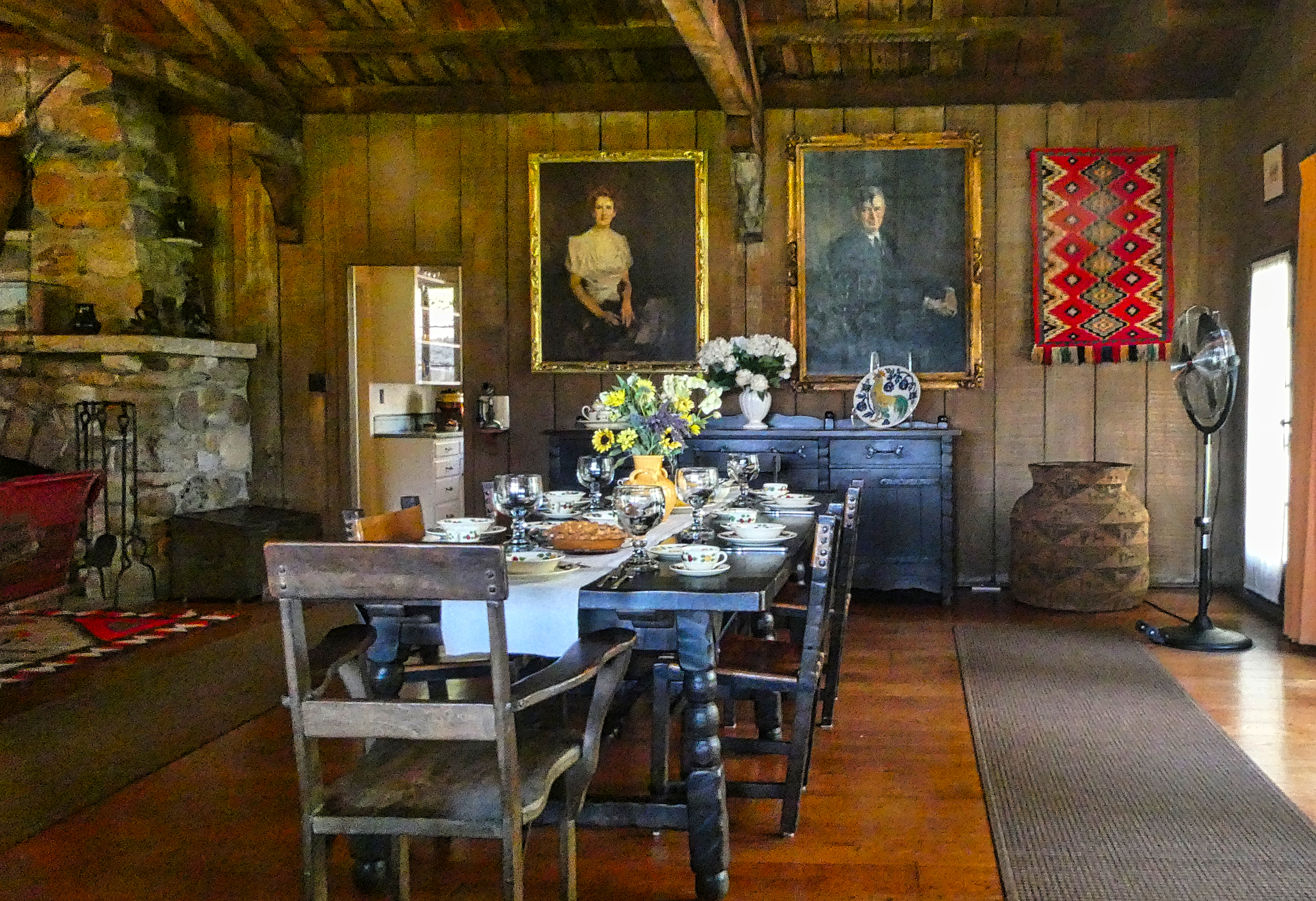
Interior of ranch home

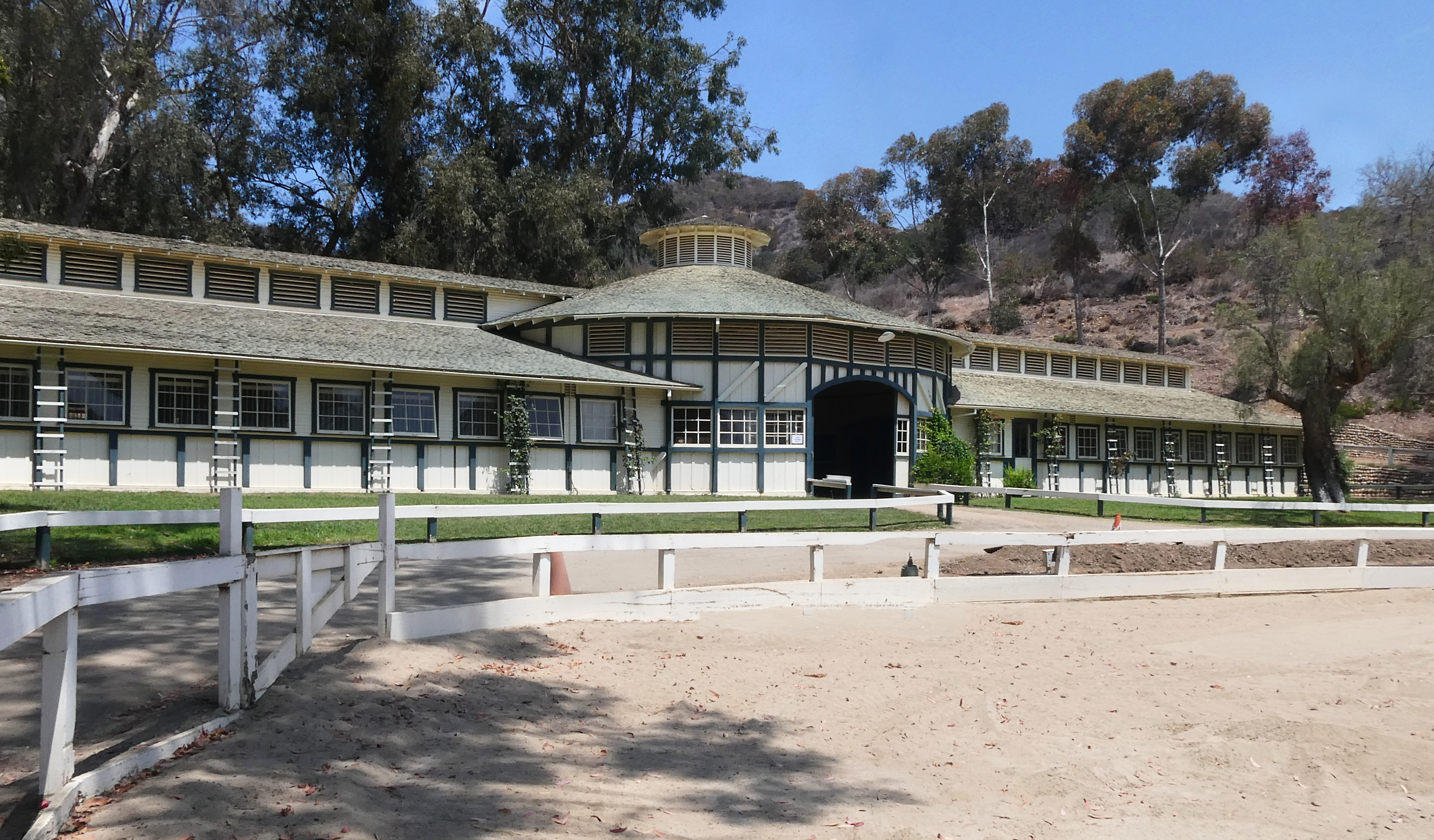
Horse stable

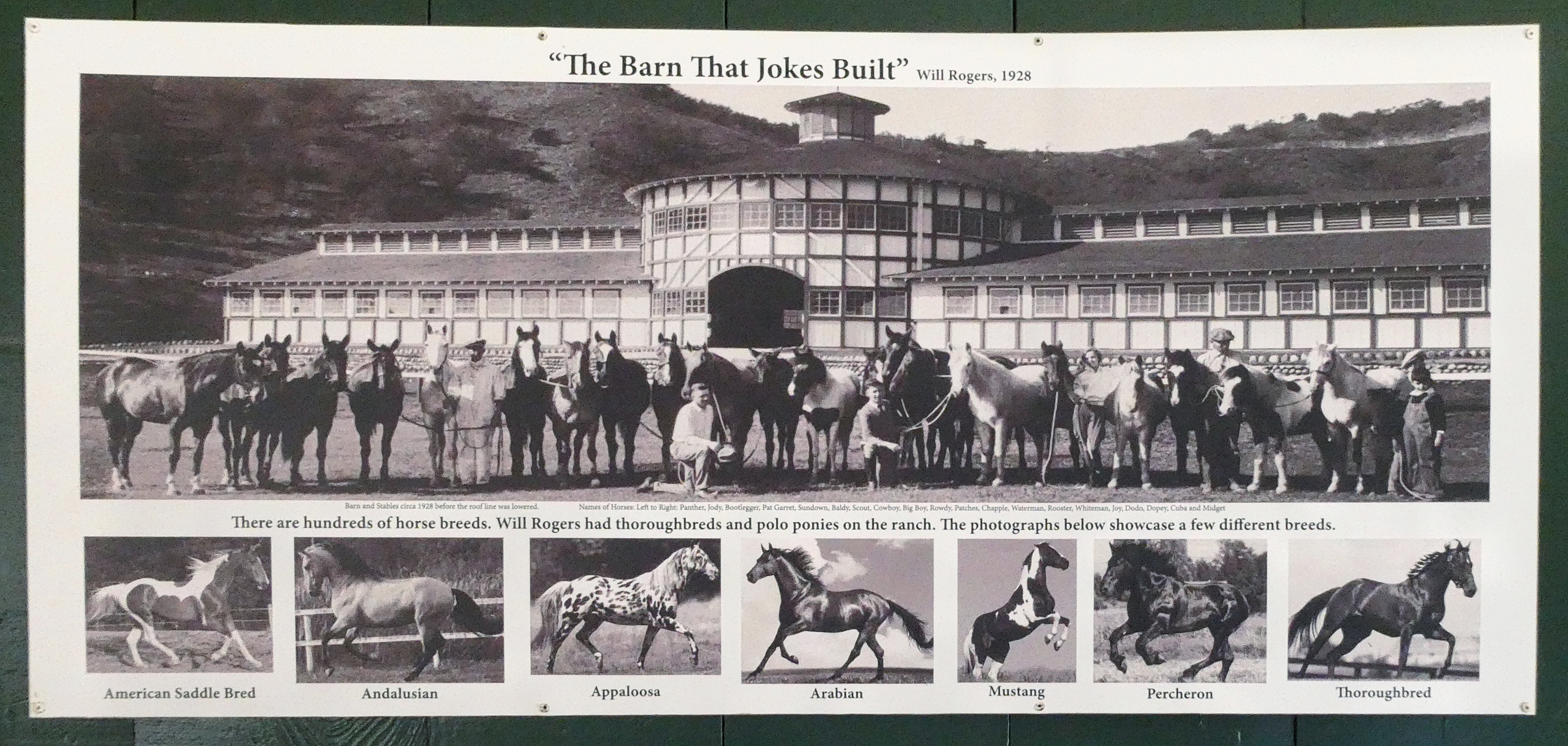
Historical photo of stable

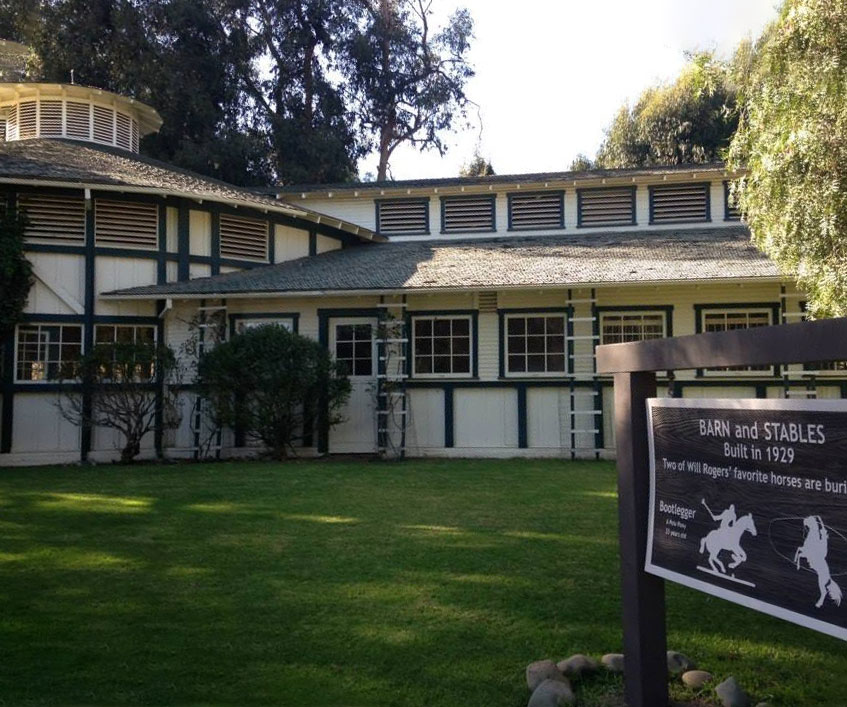
The barn and stables at the ranch.

== See also ==
- Backbone Trail System
- Santa Monica Mountains topics index
- Will Rogers State Beach
