= Sandstone Peak =

Mountain in the Santa Monica Mountains

- Mount Allen
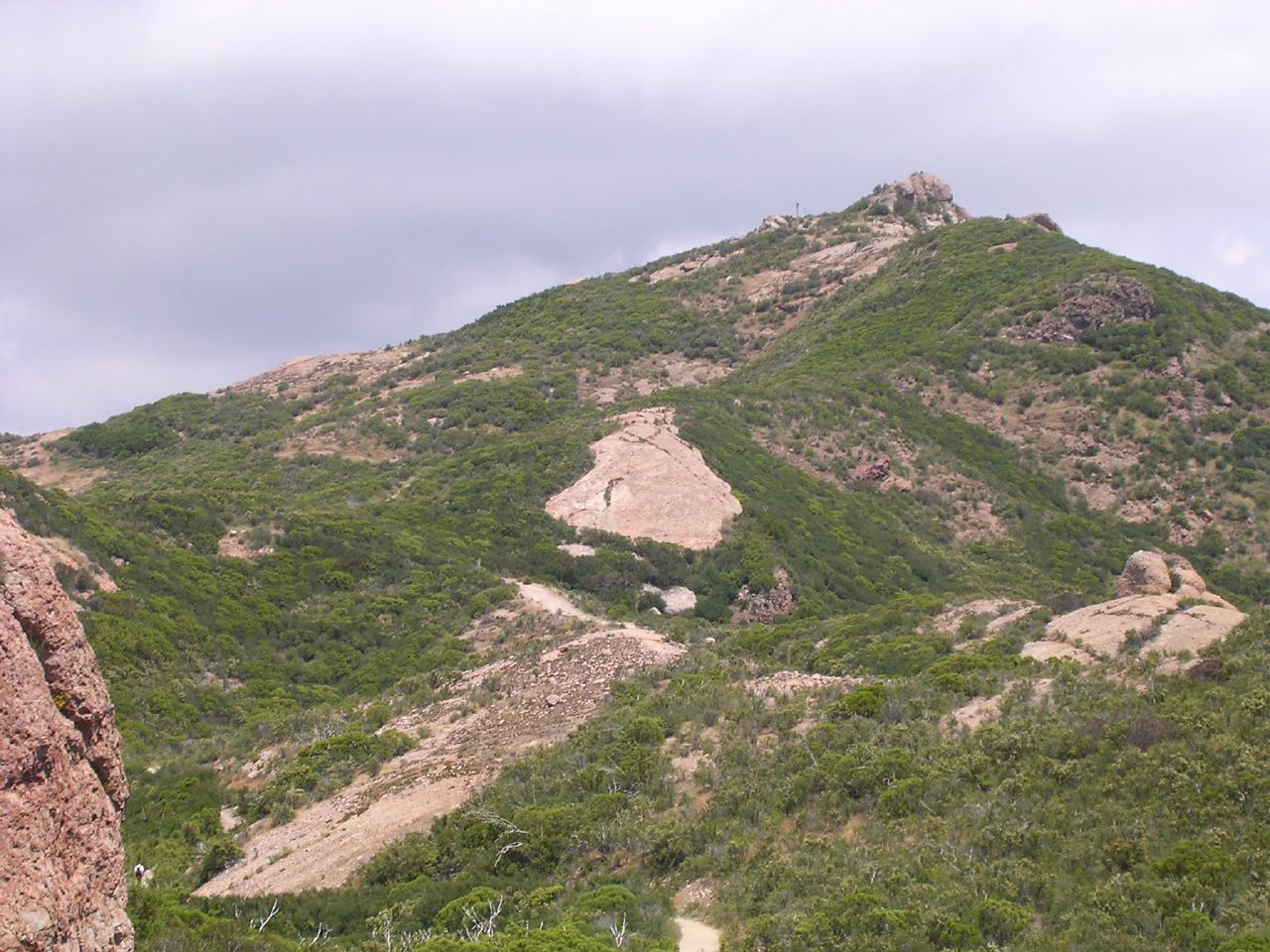

Highest point
- Elevation: 3,114 ft (949 m) NAVD 88
- Prominence: 2,201 ft (671 m)
- Isolation: 21.37 mi (34.39 km)
- Coordinates: 34°07′13″N 118°55′55″W

Geography
- Location within California Location within the United States
- Location: Ventura County, California, U.S.
- Parent range: Santa Monica Mountains
- Topo map: USGS Triunfo Pass

Climbing
- Easiest route: via Backbone Trail and spur, class 2

Sandstone Peak, also known as Mount Allen, is a mountain in Ventura County, California. It is the highest summit in the Santa Monica Mountains, with an elevation of 3,114 feet (949 m). Located near the western edge of the Santa Monica Mountains National Recreation Area, the summit provides panoramic views of Malibu, the Pacific Ocean, the Conejo Valley, and four of the Channel Islands.

== Background ==
The peak separates the drier inland valley from the coast facing side with higher humidity. The Sandstone Peak Trail, which leads to the top, connects to a vast trail system in the area, including the Backbone Trail. The mountain is highly popular with climbers, hikers, campers, and photographers.

The Boy Scouts of America petitioned the U.S. Board on Geographic Names to name the mountain for W. Herbert Allen, who had donated land for nearby Camp Circle X and other Boy Scout camps. He served as president of the Los Angeles Area Council. The board denied the request because of a long-standing policy not to approve a geographic name in commemoration of a living person. The land is now known as the Circle X Ranch, a park unit located in the Santa Monica Mountains National Recreation Area.

== Gallery ==
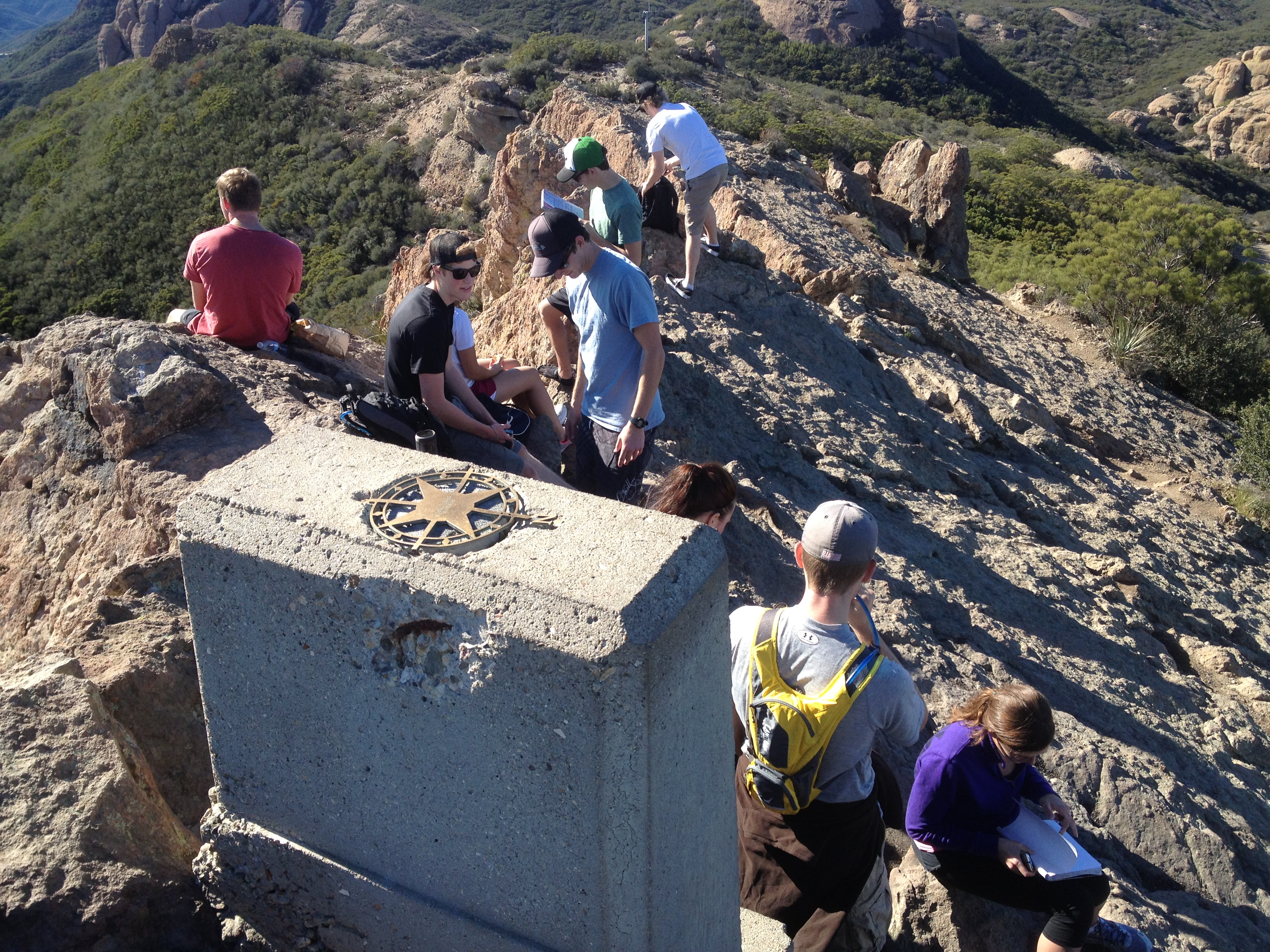
Hikers atop Sandstone Peak's summit

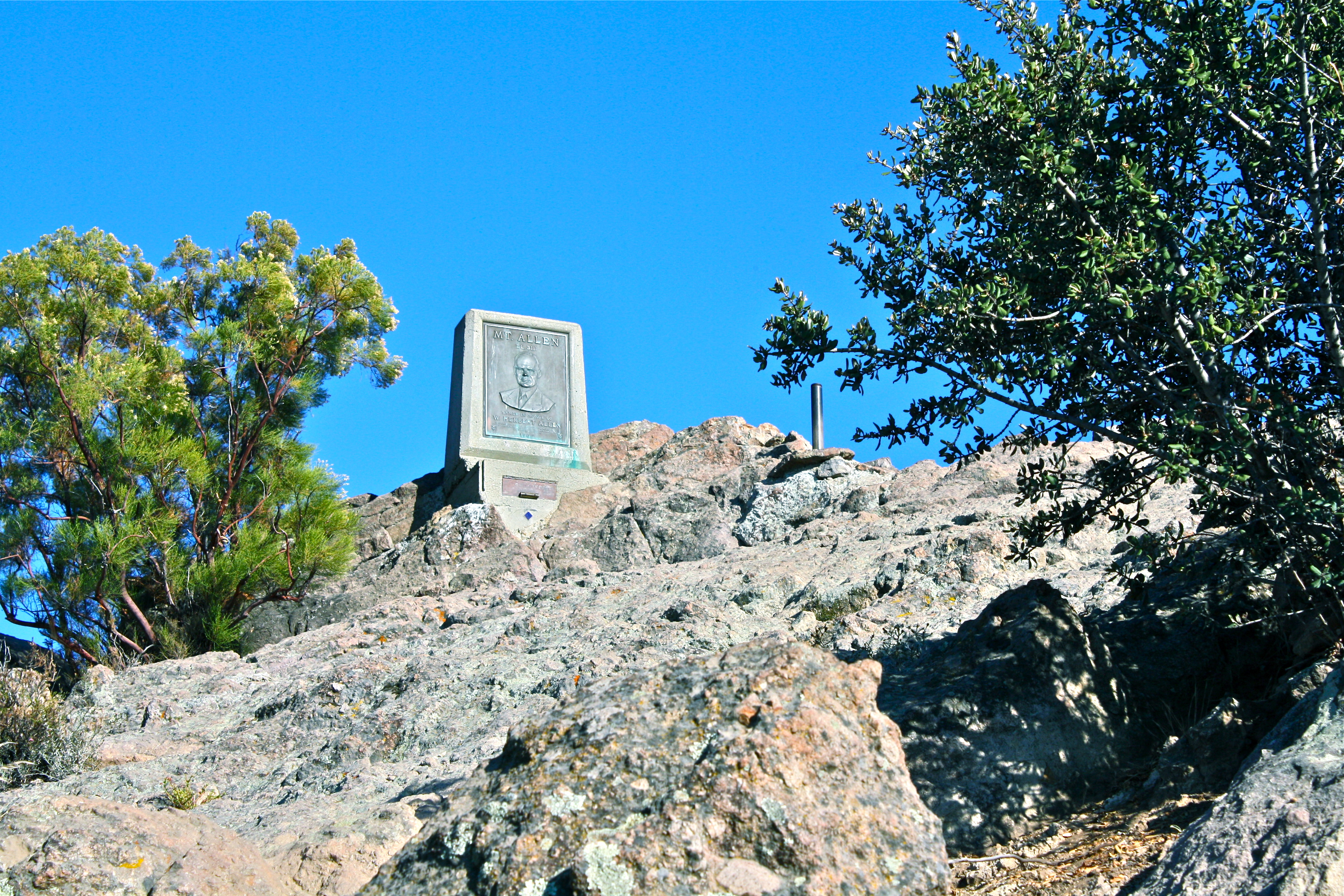
A plaque at the summit

== See also ==
- Santa Monica Mountains
- Santa Monica Mountains National Recreation Area
- List of highest points in California by county
- Backbone Trail
- Chumash people
