= Backbone Trail =

Long-distance hiking trail in the United States

Coordinates: 34°07′10″N 118°56′15″W

- The Backbone Trail between Will Rogers State Historic Park and Trippet Ranch in Topanga State Park
- Length: 67.79 mi (109.10 km)
- Location: Los Angeles County / Ventura County, California, USA
- Designation: National Recreation Trail
- Trailheads: Point Mugu State Park / Will Rogers State Historic Park
- Use: Hiking, Cycling, Horseback Riding
- Highest point: Sandstone Peak
- Lowest point: Pacific Ocean
- Difficulty: Moderate to Strenuous
- Season: Year-round
- Sights: Santa Monica Mountains
- Hazards: Heat Stroke; Poison oak Lyme disease Mountain Lions

The Backbone Trail is a long-distance trail extending 67.79 miles (109.10 km) across the Santa Monica Mountains in the U.S. state of California. Its western terminus is Point Mugu State Park, and its eastern terminus is Will Rogers State Historic Park in Pacific Palisades. The trail is open to hikers throughout its length. Dogs, mountain bicyclists and horseback riders are only allowed on portions of the trail as posted.

== History ==
Construction on the backbone trail began in the early 1980s. It involved the cooperation of the National Park Service, the California Department of Parks and Recreation, and private parties interested in connecting existing trails within the Santa Monica Mountains NRA into a single trail spanning the length of the park. The range of conditions found on the trail - ranging from flat, wide fire roads to narrow single-track trails - reflects the trail's origin as a series of unconnected paths and backcountry roads, connected to form the Backbone Trail System.

In 2016, the National Park Service completed land acquisitions from former California Governor Arnold Schwarzenegger and fitness pioneer Betty Weider to enable right-of-way for the trail. In May 2016, a new section of the trail was completed on the east side of Yerba Buena Road in support of these acquisitions.

Upon its 2016 opening, the Backbone Trail was designated a National Recreation Trail.

The official opening ceremony for the Backbone Trail was held on Saturday, June 4, 2016, at Will Rogers State Park, with a ribbon-cutting ceremony held at 10:00 am. Portions of the trail were closed after the Woolsey Fire in 2018. Other trails and several parks were closed as 88% of the federal parkland within the Santa Monica Mountains burned in the fast-moving fire. The Backbone Trail fully reopened in July 2019.

== Topography and geography ==
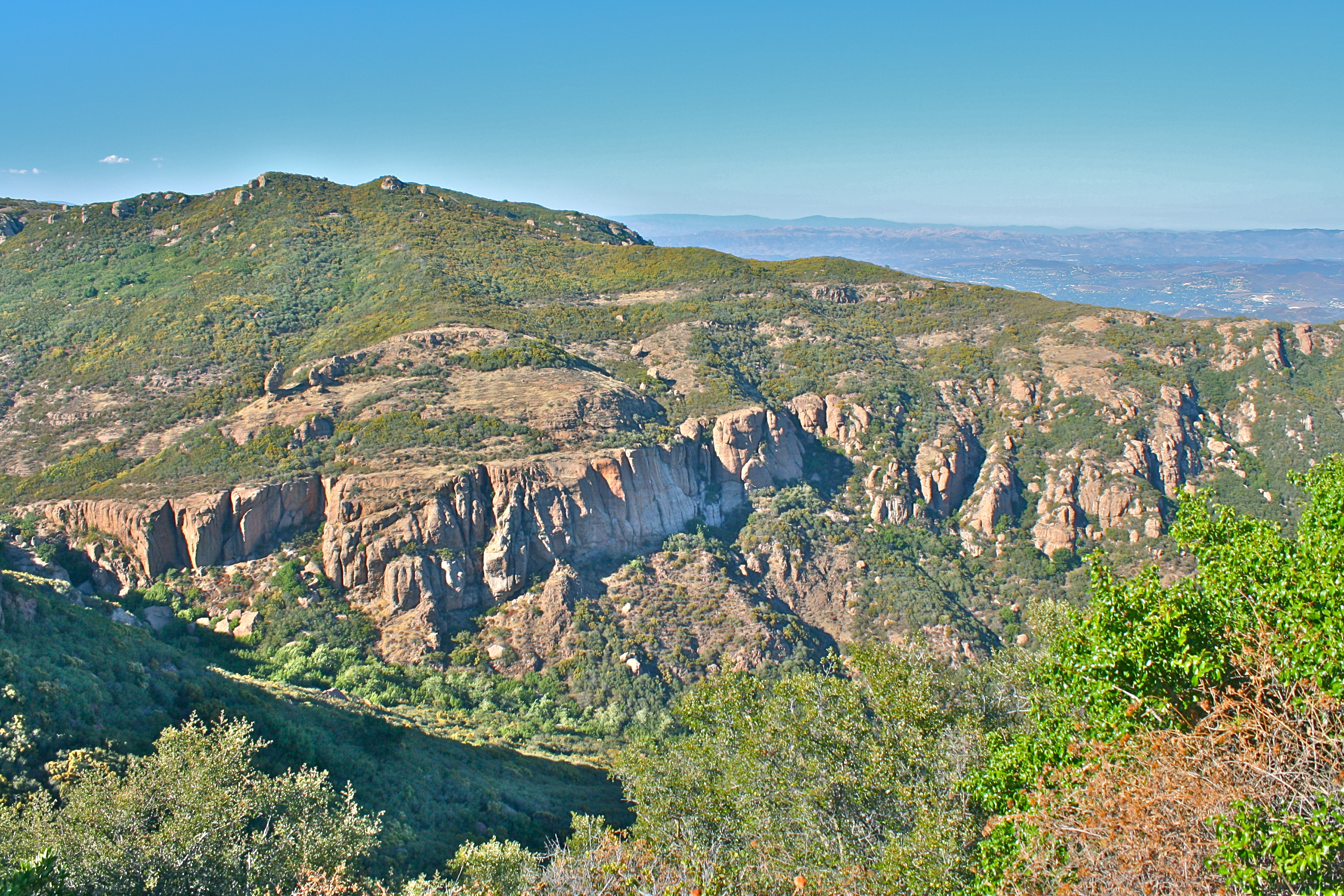
The Backbone Trail as it passes through Mishe Mokwa.

As the Backbone Trail passes over the peaks and through the canyons of the Santa Monica Mountains, it climbs and falls in elevation nearly constantly. From its lowest point, the sea-level Ray Miller Trailhead at Point Mugu State Park, to its highest point, near Sandstone Peak which, (at 3,111 ft (948 m), is the highest peak in the Santa Monica Mountains), the trail is more frequently graded than level.

Scenic views of Ventura County are seen from the 6 mi (10 km) loop trail, starting at the trailhead off Yerba Buena road. The Mishe Mokwa Trail in Circle X Ranch follows Carlisle Canyon along Boney Mountain past weathered red volcanic formations. There are views of the sculpted caves and crevices of Echo Cliffs and a forested streamside picnic area by a huge split boulder known as Split Rock. The return route on the Backbone Trail leads to Inspiration Point and culminates at Sandstone Peak, the highest point in the Santa Monica Mountains. Both points overlook the Pacific Ocean, the Channel Islands, and the surrounding mountains.

Parts of the trail lie within the city limits of Los Angeles and Malibu, California; the rest sits in unincorporated areas of Los Angeles County and Ventura County. The following national, state, and privately administered wilderness areas are traversed by the Backbone Trail:

- Will Rogers State Historic Park
- Santa Monica Mountains National Recreation Area
- Topanga State Park
- Cold Creek Canyon Preserve - owned by the Mountains Restoration Trust.
- Malibu Creek State Park
- Zuma and Trancas Canyons
- Point Mugu State Park

== Environment ==
Chumash villages once stood throughout the Santa Monica Mountains. The California chaparral and woodlands and California coastal sage and chaparral ecoregions supported Indigenous people for tens of thousands of years. A wide range of flora and fauna can be observed from the trail.

=== Flora ===
For the majority of its length, the Backbone Trail passes through terrain occupied by the ground-hugging bushes and shrubs that characterize the coastal sage scrub and chaparral ecosystems. Relatively few trees line the trail, an essential consideration for travelers looking for shade.

=== Fauna ===
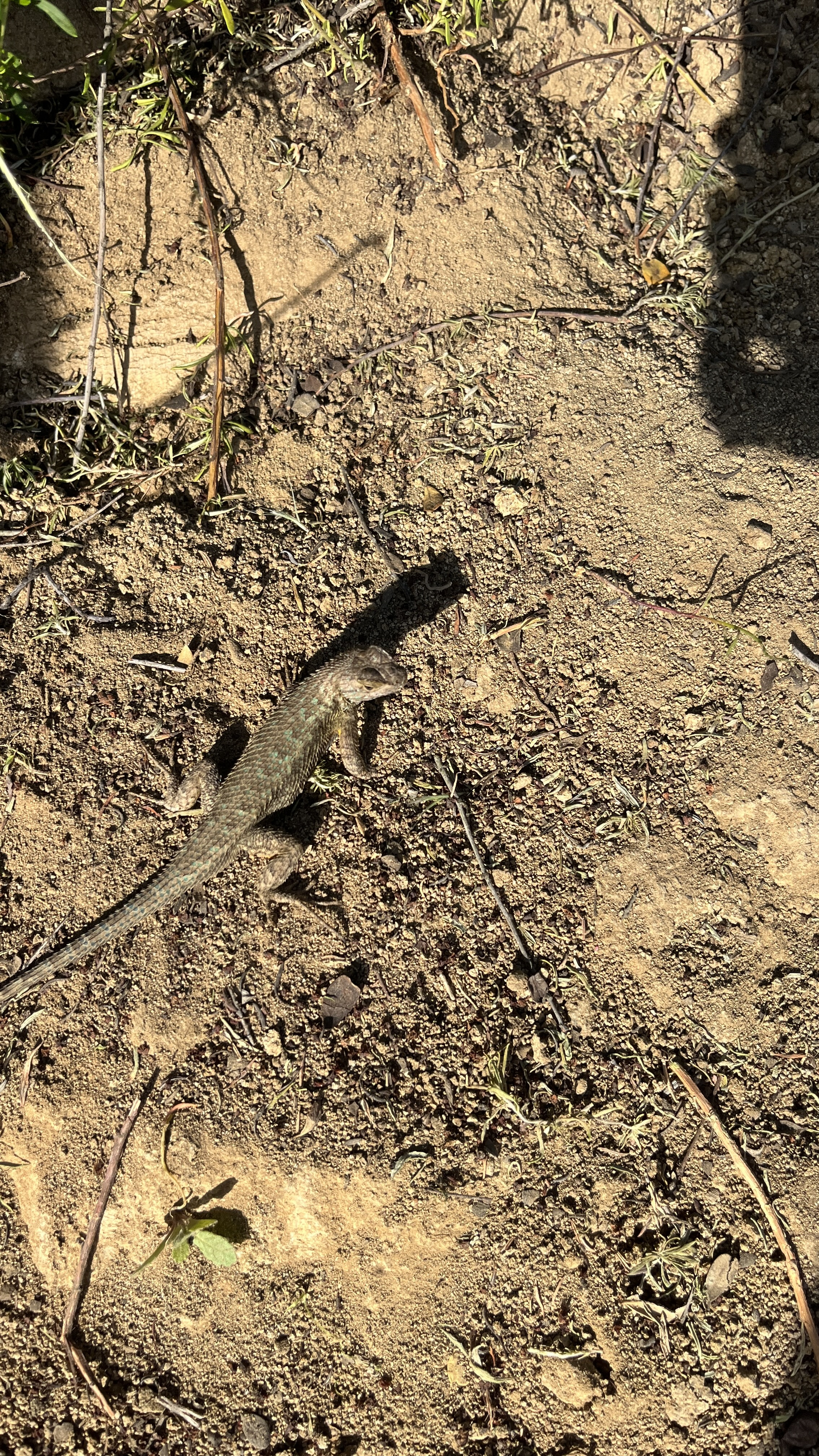
A lizard seen on the Backbone Trail.

More than 450 vertebrate species have been observed within the Santa Monica Mountains NRA, including more than 380 species of birds. Lizards, seven species of which inhabit areas surrounding the trail, are particularly numerous, and can be easily found on or alongside the trail. Southern Pacific rattlesnakes can be numerous in early spring, particularly along Temescal Ridge in the eastern section of the trail. Mountain lions have been observed in the western section near Sandstone Peak trailhead in June 2008. At least eight mountain lions are believed to remain from Pt. Mugu to Topanga State Park. Notable species that can found along the Backbone trail include:

- Bobcat
- California Kingsnake
- Coyote
- Mountain lion
- Pacific treefrog
- Peregrine falcon
- Red-tailed hawk
- Southern Pacific rattlesnake

== Hiking ==
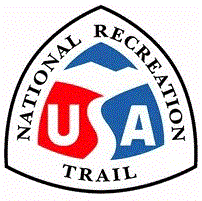
National Recreation Trail

The Backbone Trail follows a well-maintained, single-track path with some dirt fire roads along the route. The trail is very well designed with climbs and descents occurring on well-graded trails full of switchbacks. The trail can be hiked in either the westbound or eastbound direction. There are no major differences between the two directions. Hiking westbound, you will progress towards more remote territory and can end your hike at the Pacific Ocean, but transportation may be more difficult from the Ray Miller Trailhead. There is no permit required for hiking the BBT.

Camping along the Backbone Trail is restricted to established campgrounds. These include group campsites that can be reserved in advance and walk-in campsites that are available on a first-come, first-served basis. There are still relatively few established campgrounds right on the BBT, and they are not evenly spaced out, posing a logistical challenge for an end-to-end hike. Backpacking the full length of the BBT with reasonable daily mileages may require the use of off-trail camping and lodging options, which are available within a reasonable distance from the trail.

== See also ==
- Mulholland Highway
- Park to Playa Trail
