= Deer Ridge Open Space =

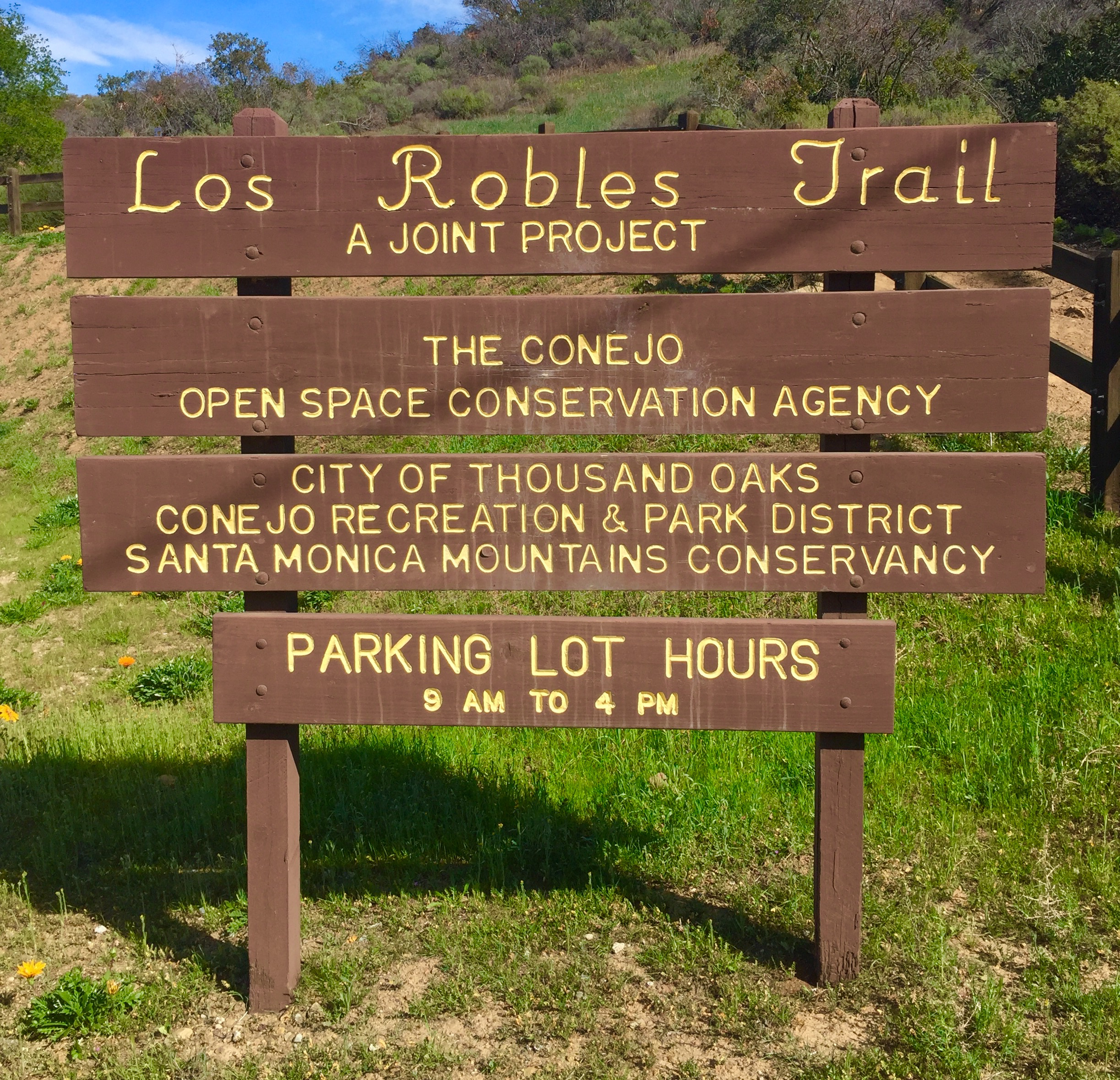
- Sign by the Los Robles Trailhead on Potrero Road
- Interactive map of Deer Ridge Open Space
- Type: Open-space park
- Location: Newbury Park, CA
- Coordinates: 34°09′19.8″N 118°56′31.4″W
- Area: 188 acres (76 ha)
- Operator: Conejo Open Space Conservation Agency (COSCA)
- Status: Open

Deer Ridge Open Space is a 188-acre public-owned open-space area in the southwest portion of the town of Newbury Park, California. It contains a series of north-facing mountainous ridges and canyons, dominated by chaparral and oak trees. It shares borders with the Santa Monica Mountains National Recreation Area to the south, and the Los Robles Trail traverses the length of Deer Ridge Open Space. Its main trailhead is located on Potrero Road, while a smaller access point is located at the southern end of Felton Street. The Los Robles Trail is the Conejo Open Space Conservation Agency’s longest trail, and connects to open-space areas and parks such as the Los Padres Open Space, Conejo Ridge Open Space, Hope Nature Preserve, Old Conejo Open Space, and the Los Vientos Open Space. The trail in Newbury Park provides panoramic views of the Conejo Valley and Santa Monica Mountains, before entering the Hope Nature Preserve. The Los Robles Trail provides more than 25 miles of contiguous trails connecting Newbury Park to Westlake Village in Los Angeles County. Immediately south of the Deer Ridge Open Space in Newbury Park are the Hidden Valley and Rancho Sierra Vista Satwiwa.

The trails are utilized by hikers, mountain bikers, equestrians, and for jogging or running. It is part of a Southern California wildlife corridor that also links through trails to the Point Mugu State Park and the oceanfront Santa Monica Mountains. Some of the fauna includes the American black bear, Mountain lion, Coyote, Grey fox, Mule deer, Bobcat, Southern Pacific Rattlesnake, Stripe-tailed scorpion, and much more. The flora consists of various Chaparral, Coastal sage scrub, and pockets of oak woodlands. The Los Robles Trail is the main trail in the Deer Ridge Open Space and follows the east-west ridge to the Hope Nature Preserve, and beyond to Thousand Oaks, CA. The trail provides panoramic views of the Santa Monica Mountains to the right, while the high elevation makes for great overlooks of Newbury Park on the left side of the trail. It leads to the 1,600-foot high Angel Vista in the Ventu Park Open Space after transversing the Deer Ridge in southern Newbury Park.

To get here from the Ventura Freeway (U.S. 101), exit at Wendy Drive and head south towards the Santa Monica Mountains. When the road ends in front of the trailheads to the Santa Monica Mountains National Recreation Area on the opposite side of the intersection, make a left on Potrero Road and follow the road for 0.5 miles until the trailhead parking lot appears on the left side of the street.

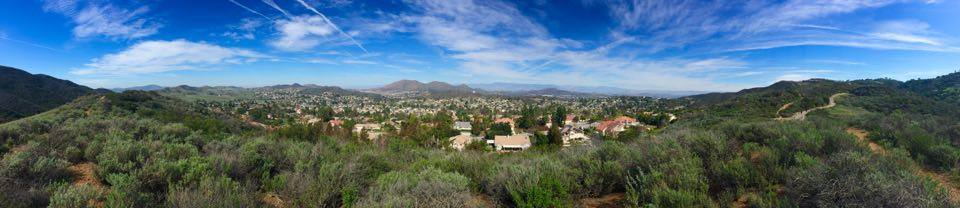
Panoramic view of Newbury Park with the Conejo Mountains in the far back. Taken from the Los Robles Trail.
