= Ventu Park Open Space =

Park in California, United States

Coordinates: 34.1685°N 118.9182°W

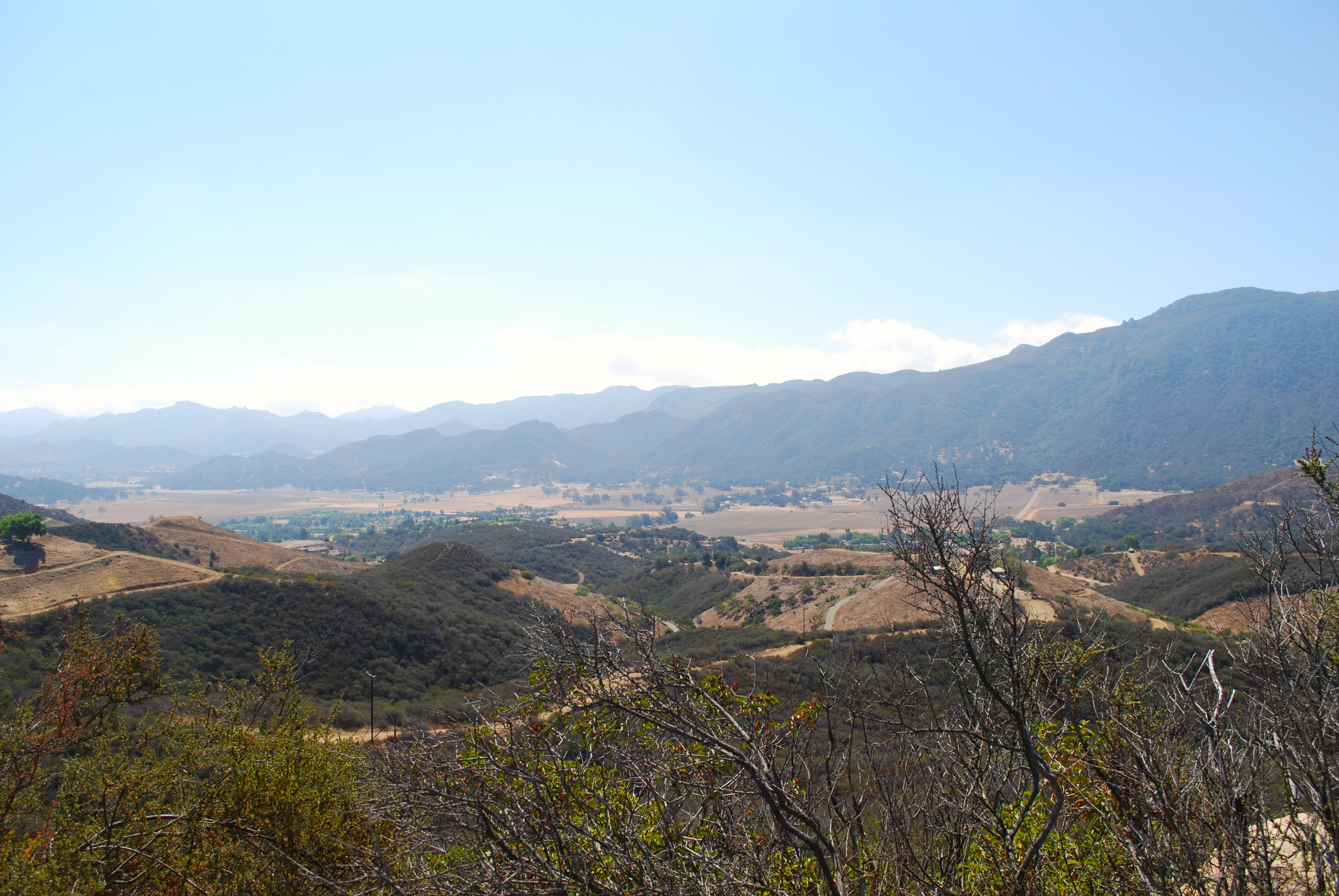
- View of Hidden Valley and the Santa Monica Mountains from atop Angel Vista.
- Interactive map of Ventu Park Open Space
- Type: Open-space park
- Location: Newbury Park, CA
- Area: 141 acres (57 ha)
- Operator: Conejo Open Space Conservation Agency (COSCA)
- Status: Open

Ventu Park Open Space is a 141-acre open space area in Newbury Park, California. Its primary features are the Rosewood Trail leading to Angel Vista, a 1,603 ft peak in the Santa Monica Mountains. Parking for the Rosewood Trail is located at the Stagecoach Inn Park, across Lynn Road from the primary trailhead. The Rosewood Trail begins with oak woodland and crosses a creek at the canyon floor, before climbing up towards the steep Angel Vista Point. There are 360-degree panoramic views of the Conejo Valley, the Oxnard Plain, the California Channel Islands, Pacific Ocean, Point Mugu, Hidden Valley, as well as the Santa Monica, Santa Susana and Topa Topa Mountains.

To get here from the Ventura Freeway, exit on Ventu Park Road in Newbury Park, CA. Continue for 0.6 miles south until reaching Lynn Road. Pass the Stagecoach Inn Museum on the right and turn right for one block before parking at Susan Drive and the Stagecoach Inn Park, located on the right. The Rosewood Trail is located across Lynn Road. The trail was established in the early 1980s and has an elevation gain of 800 feet.

== Rosewood Trail ==
The Rosewood Trail is the starting point for the Los Robles Trail, the longest trail operated by the Conejo Open Space Conservation Agency (COSCA). It connects to various open space areas and nature preserves in the Greater Thousand Oaks Area, including the Hope Nature Preserve, Los Padres Open Space, Conejo Ridge Open Space, Deer Ridge Open Space, Old Conejo Open Space and Los Vientos Open Space. The 25-mile Los Robles Trail begins by Angel Vista Point and is a 25-mile trail connecting Newbury Park and the City of Westlake Village by crossing Hidden Valley, Thousand Oaks and Lake Sherwood.

Alternatively, hikers can cross the Potrero Ridge and join the trail leading to Satwiwa, which again connects to Point Mugu through trails crossing the Santa Monica Mountains through the Big Sycamore Canyon. The trails here are used by equestrians, mountain bikers as well as hikers. The Rosewood Trail is a 5-mile roundtrip hike from the Stagecoach Inn Park to the top of Angel Vista.

== See also ==
- Ventu Park
