= Ventu Park, California =

Unincorporated area in Ventura County, California, United States

Coordinates: 34°10′43″N 118°54′41″W

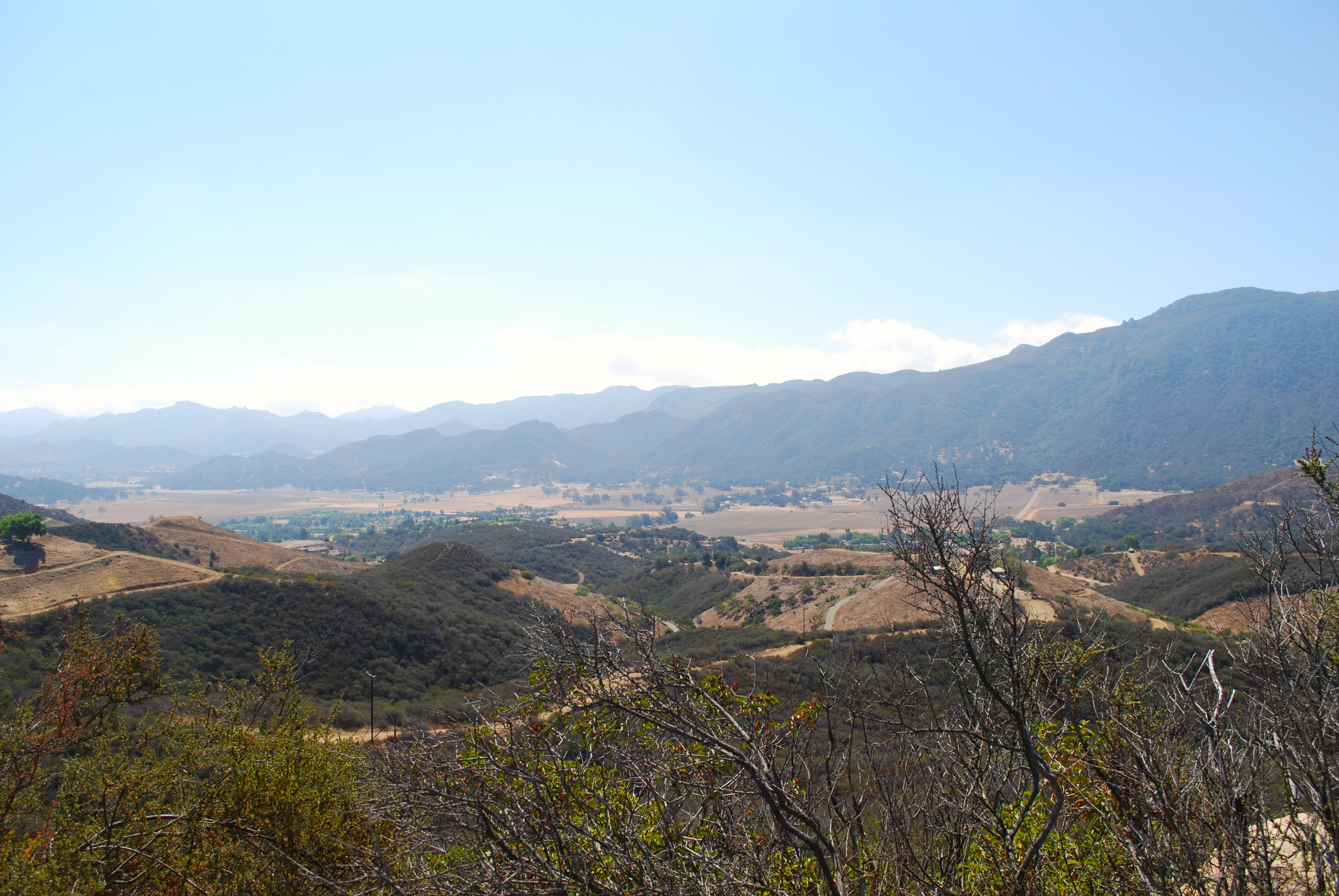
Hidden Valley and the Santa Monica's as seen from atop Angel Vista.

Ventu Park (/ˌvɛntuː -/) is an unincorporated community in southern Newbury Park, California. Unlike most of Newbury Park, Ventu Park is not within the Thousand Oaks city limits. It borders Ventu Park Open Space in the north, Hidden Valley in the south, and Hope Nature Preserve in the east. It is bounded by Lynn Road to the north, Lynnview Street to the west, and Ventu Park fire lane to the south. It consists of 1,500 homes in a two square mile area. The area is known for hiking and the Los Robles Trail connects with neighboring trails that lead to the Santa Monica Mountains. Mountain biking is also popular in the area. Like the rest of Newbury Park the temperature remains temperate year-long. The region has a mild, year-round Mediterranean climate or Dry-Summer Subtropical zone climate, with warm, sunny, dry summers and cool, rainy winters. Vegetation is typical of Mediterranean environments, with chaparral and grasses on the hillsides and numerous western valley oaks. Ventu Park receives cool air from the ocean through various hill and mountain passes that creates a mild microclimate.

== See also ==
- Casa Conejo
