= Satwiwa =

Coordinates: 34°9′1″N 118°57′41″W

Satwiwa Native American Indian Culture Center
- Established: 1980
- Location: 4126 1 W. Potrero Road, Newbury Park, CA 91320
- Type: Culture Center; National Park
- Public transit access: Thousand Oaks Transit (TOT)
- Website: Official websites

Satwiwa (Chumash: "the bluffs") was a former Chumash village in the Santa Monica Mountains of Newbury Park, California. The current Satwiwa Native American Indian Culture Center is operated by the National Park Service in cooperation with the Friends of Satwiwa. Satwiwa has been inhabited by Chumash Indians for over 10,000 years. It is situated at the foothills of Boney Mountain, a sacred mountain for the Chumash.

Bordering thousands of acres of wilderness in the Santa Monica Mountains, the fauna surrounding Satwiwa includes golden eagles, mountain lions, Valley coyotes, snakes, bobcats, foxes, falcons, and hawks.

The main trail from Satwiwa is nicknamed "the backdoor to the Point Mugu State Park". Satwiwa is one of the four primary entrances to the Santa Monica Mountains National Recreation Area.

== Etymology ==
Satwiwa is Chumashan and directly translates to "the bluffs." By strict definition, the name, which also can translate to "higher places", originally referred to the neighboring mountain, known as Boney Mountain. Satwiwa (Sat-wi'wa) was also the Chumashan name used for a former village near the current culture center. The original Chumash village was just north of Big Sycamore Canyon in southern Newbury Park, at the foothills of Mount Boney.

== Background ==
National Park map

Satwiwa is adjacent to the Santa Monica Mountains and Rancho Sierra Vista within the Santa Monica Mountains National Recreation Area. It is situated at the western end of the Santa Monica Mountains of Newbury Park, California and borders National Park land. Satwiwa and surrounding areas have been inhabited by the Chumash people for over 10,000 years. The site of the former Native American village has been developed as a nature center. It includes a Chumash Indian demonstration area, where Native American docents or park rangers are available for presentations during weekends. Art shows, ceremonies, and interactive exhibits also take place at Satwiwa. Hiking trails connect to the larger Point Mugu State Park, including trails to nearby waterfalls in the Santa Monica Mountains.

Satwiwa (meaning "bluffs") and surrounding Point Mugu State Park (Mugu derives from the Chumashan word "muwu", meaning beach) make up 16,000 acres at the northwest edge of the Santa Monica Mountains. The landscape is characterized by the dramatic backdrops of Boney Mountain, rocky canyons, coastal shrubs, creekbeds, oak and sycamore trees, rolling green slopes, and chaparral. A multitude of trails connect to open-space areas such as the Santa Monica Mountains National Recreation Area, Los Robles Open Space, Dos Vientos Open Space, Circle X Ranch, Ventu Park, and others.

== History ==
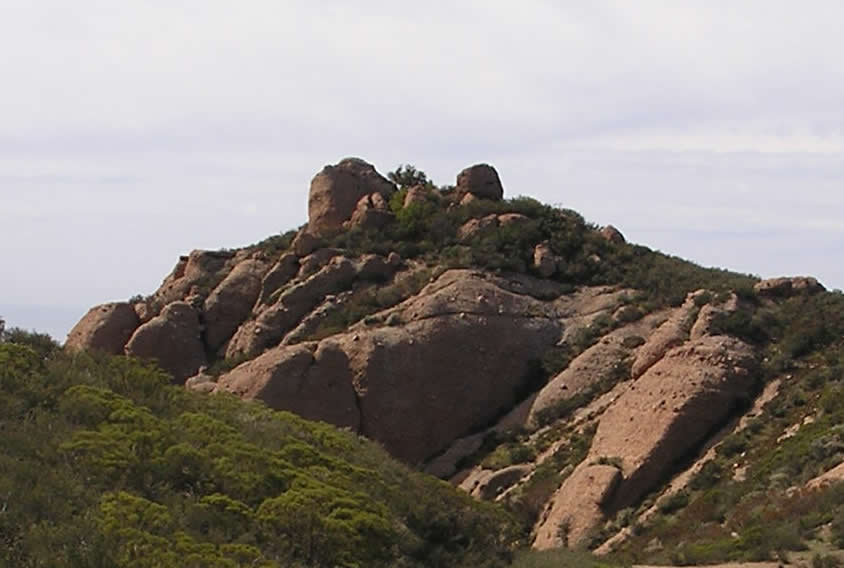
Satwiwa is located in the foothills of Boney Mountain, which is sacred to the Chumash.

Native Americans have lived in the area for over 10,000 years. With a hunting and gathering lifestyle based on the abundance of foods in the area, they fished in the Pacific Ocean and hunted deer and rabbits in the canyons. They also gathered acorns from the surrounding oak trees, which they ground to process for food, often combining them with roots or berries. The thriving tribes lived in the center of a commerce that extended up and down the coast, as far west as the California Channel Islands.

In the mid-1500s, the Spaniards were the first Europeans to encounter the native peoples. During colonization, the Spanish established various nearby missions to claim the territory for Spain. With the arrival of the Spanish, the village of Satwiwa was absorbed within Rancho El Conejo.

Native Americans of Chumash, Tataviam, Tongva and Vanyume ancestries now organize programs at Satwiwa Center in order to keep traditions alive. There they showcase their culture through a variety of contemporary programs, arts and displays. Traditional and religious ceremonies and dances are still held at Satwiwa Center.

The site of Satwiwa was purchased by the U.S. National Park Service in 1980 and a cultural center was developed there. Situated in the Santa Monica Mountains of Newbury Park, California, the Satwiwa Native-American Indian Culture Center is operated in partnership between the Chumash and the U.S. National Park Service. The center offers a diverse range of educational lectures and workshops, Native American art displays, and more.

== Chumash Indians ==
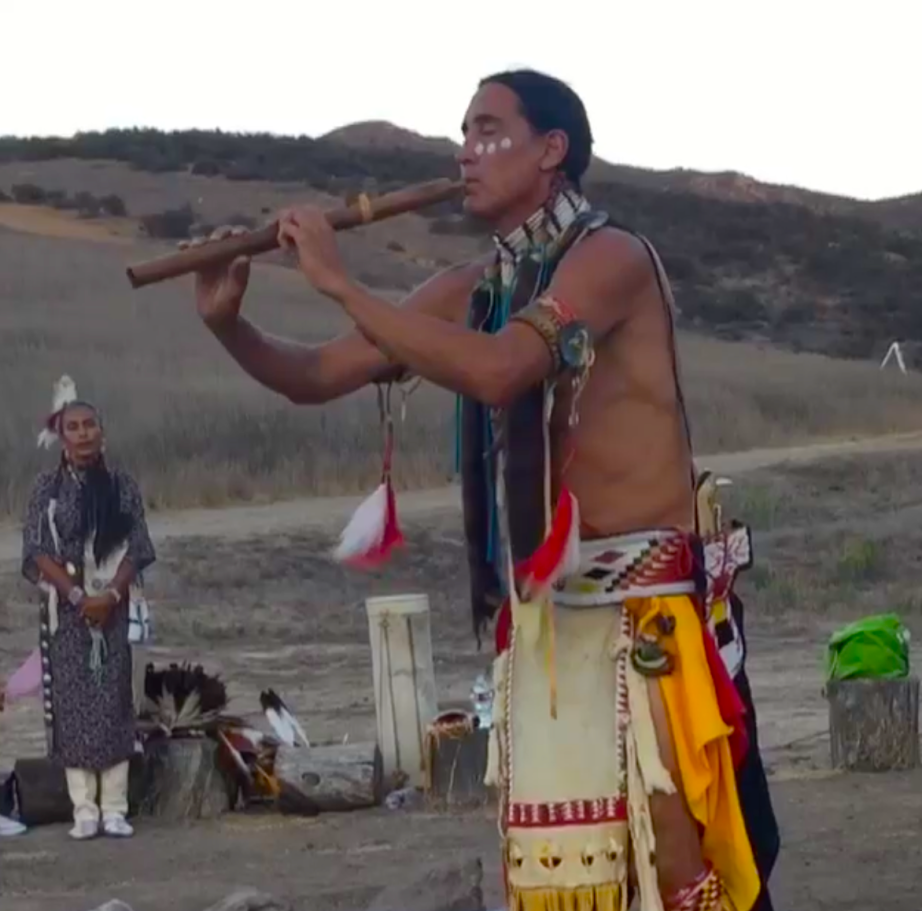
Chumash flute player at Satwiwa

The Ventureño Chumash Indians first settled in Satwiwa 13,000 years ago, and lived in the village as recently as 2,000 years ago. The village served as a post for travelers and traders who crossed the Santa Monica Mountains through the Sycamore Canyon in order to get from the Conejo Valley to the Mugu Lagoon and the Pacific Ocean. The Chumash traded with the Gabrieleño-Tongva Indians, who mostly lived in areas of Los Angeles County. Numerous Chumash artifacts and petroglyphs have been discovered in the surrounding area, particularly along the Arroyo Conejo on its way to its estuary in the Mugu Lagoon. Satwiwa is situated at the foothills of Boney Mountain, which is a sacred mountain for the Chumash people. Many of the artifacts are for display at the Satwiwa Native American Indian Culture Center and the Chumash exhibit at the Stagecoach Inn Museum in Newbury Park, as well as at the Chumash Indian Museum in Thousand Oaks.

Satwiwa is still regularly used by Native-American groups, particularly by the Chumash Barbareño-Ventureño Band of Mission Indians for events such as community dancing and celebrations of various ceremonies, e.g. summer solstice and the Hutash ceremony.

The original inhabitants of the village of Satwiwa recognized Boney Mountain as the sacred home of all of creation. The peak remains sacred to the Chumash people today. The cultural center houses a Chumash demonstration village which sits across the path from the center. This reconstructed Chumash village houses the traditionally made ‘ap (houses). It is particularly visited during weekends when Native-American teachers and National Park rangers are present.

== Recreation ==
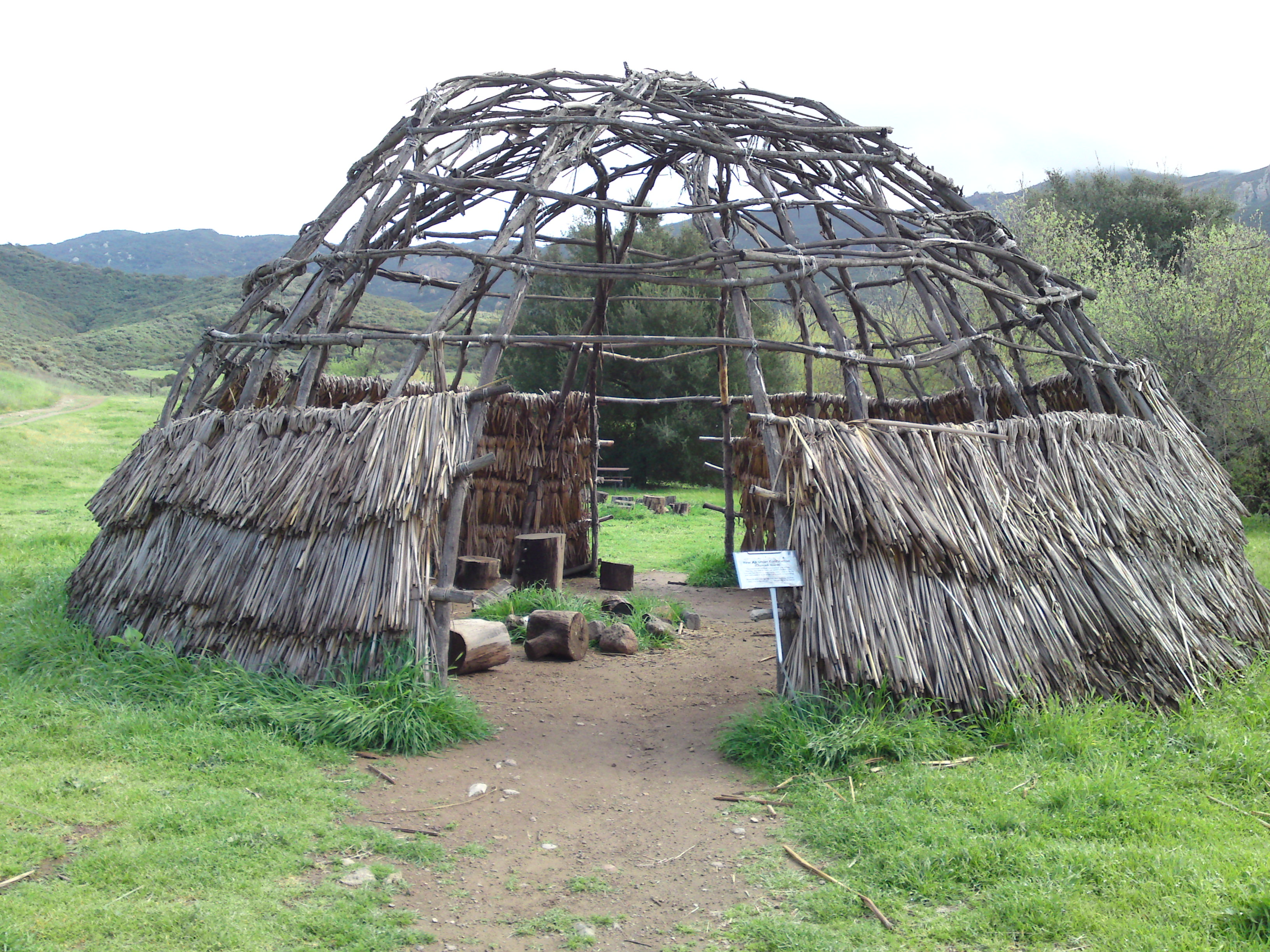
A Chumash 'ap (house) at the demonstration village

Over 100 miles of trails can be found within Point Mugu State Park, which is one of California's largest state parks. Almost half the state park's total area make up Boney Mountain State Wilderness Area, a natural wilderness surrounding Mount Boney, a sacred mountain to the Chumash people. Several trails lead to a series of cascades, mountain overlooks, and some cross the Santa Monica Mountains leading to the coast of Point Mugu. While Old Boney Loop leads from Satwiwa to the heart of the Boney Mountain State Wilderness, the shorter hike to Sycamore Canyon Waterfall is 3.5 miles roundtrip from the Satwiwa Native American Culture Center. Sycamore Canyon Waterfall consists of a 70-foot series of cascades near a tree-covered creek bed.

There are numerous overlapping trails throughout the surrounding area, and trails are utilized by both runners, hikers, equestrians, mountain bikers, and others.

== Wildlife ==
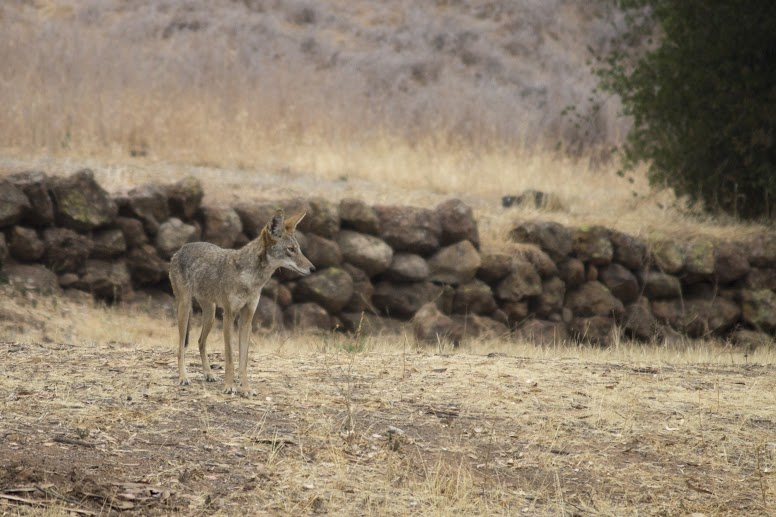
Coyote at Rancho Sierra Vista

Adjacent to national park land – Santa Monica Mountains National Recreation Area – wildlife is in abundance near Satwiwa. Commonly encountered species include rabbits, coyotes, deer, prairie falcons, roadrunners, hawks, golden eagles, foxes, and raccoons.

The surrounding area is home of a variety of wildlife, including rattlesnakes and mountain lions.

=== Mammals ===
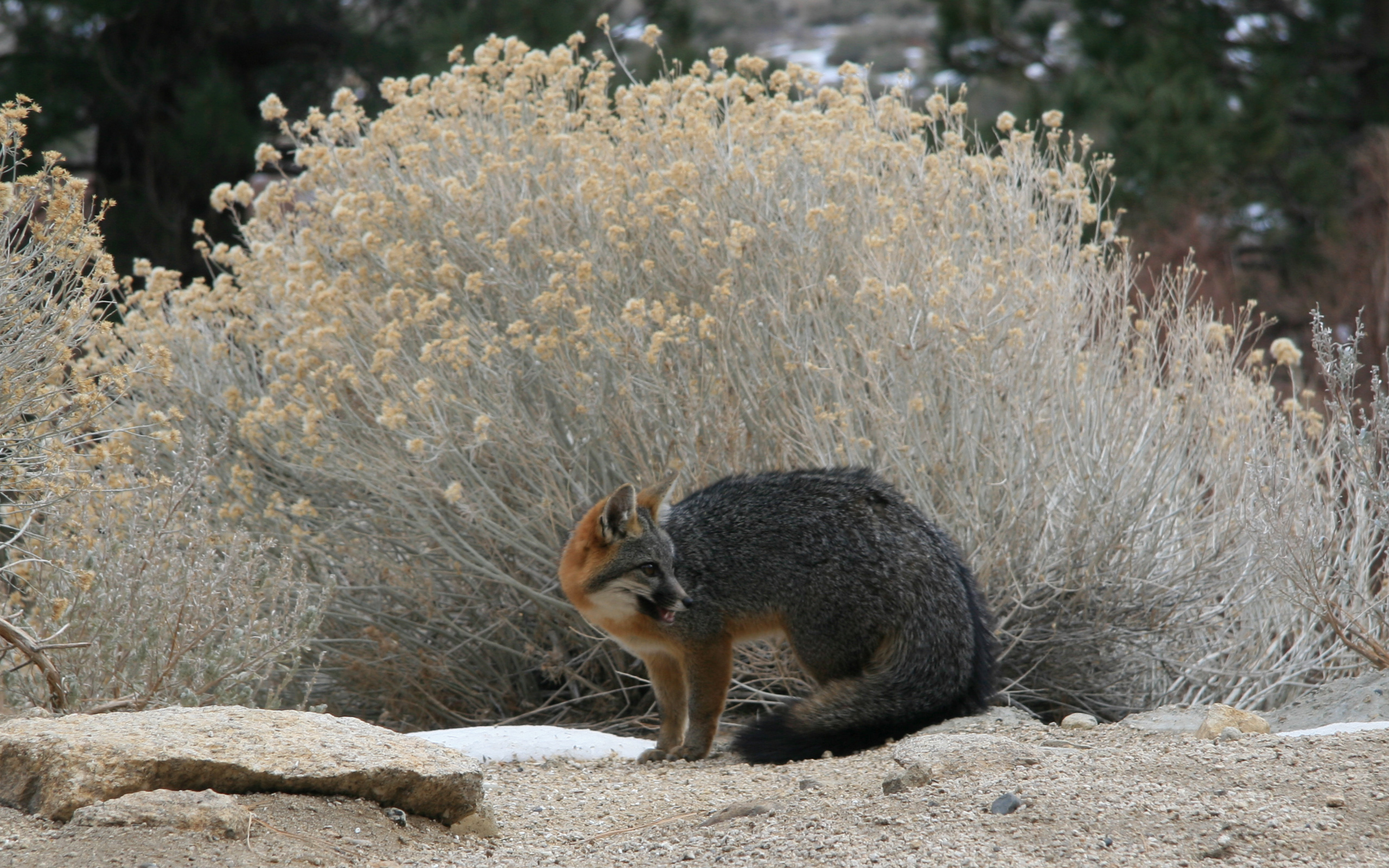
Gray Fox

The surrounding Santa Monica Mountains National Recreation Area (SMMNRA) is home to more than 45 species of mammals. List of mammals found in SMMNRA:

- Virginia opossum
- California raccoon
- American badger
- Gray fox
- Valley coyote
- Red fox
- Bobcat
- Mountain lion
- Ring-tailed cat
- Striped skunk
- Spotted skunk
- Long-tailed weasel
- Black-tailed jackrabbit
- Desert cottontail
- Brush rabbit
- Mule deer
- Western gray squirrel
- Fox squirrel
- California ground squirrel
- Merriam's chipmunk
- Botta's pocket gopher
- Desert shrew
- Ornate shrew
- Broad-footed mole
- Pallid bat
- Big brown bat
- Hoary bat
- California myotis
- Yuma myotis
- Western pipistrelle
- Western mastiff bat
- Mexican free-tailed bat
- Pacific kangaroo rat
- California pocket mouse
- California vole
- Dusky-footed woodrat
- Desert woodrat
- Brush mouse
- California mouse
- Cactus mouse
- House mouse
- Deer mouse
- Pinyon mouse
- Western harvest mouse
- Brown rat
- Black rat
