= Lynn Oaks Park =

Community park in Newbury Park, California, U.S.

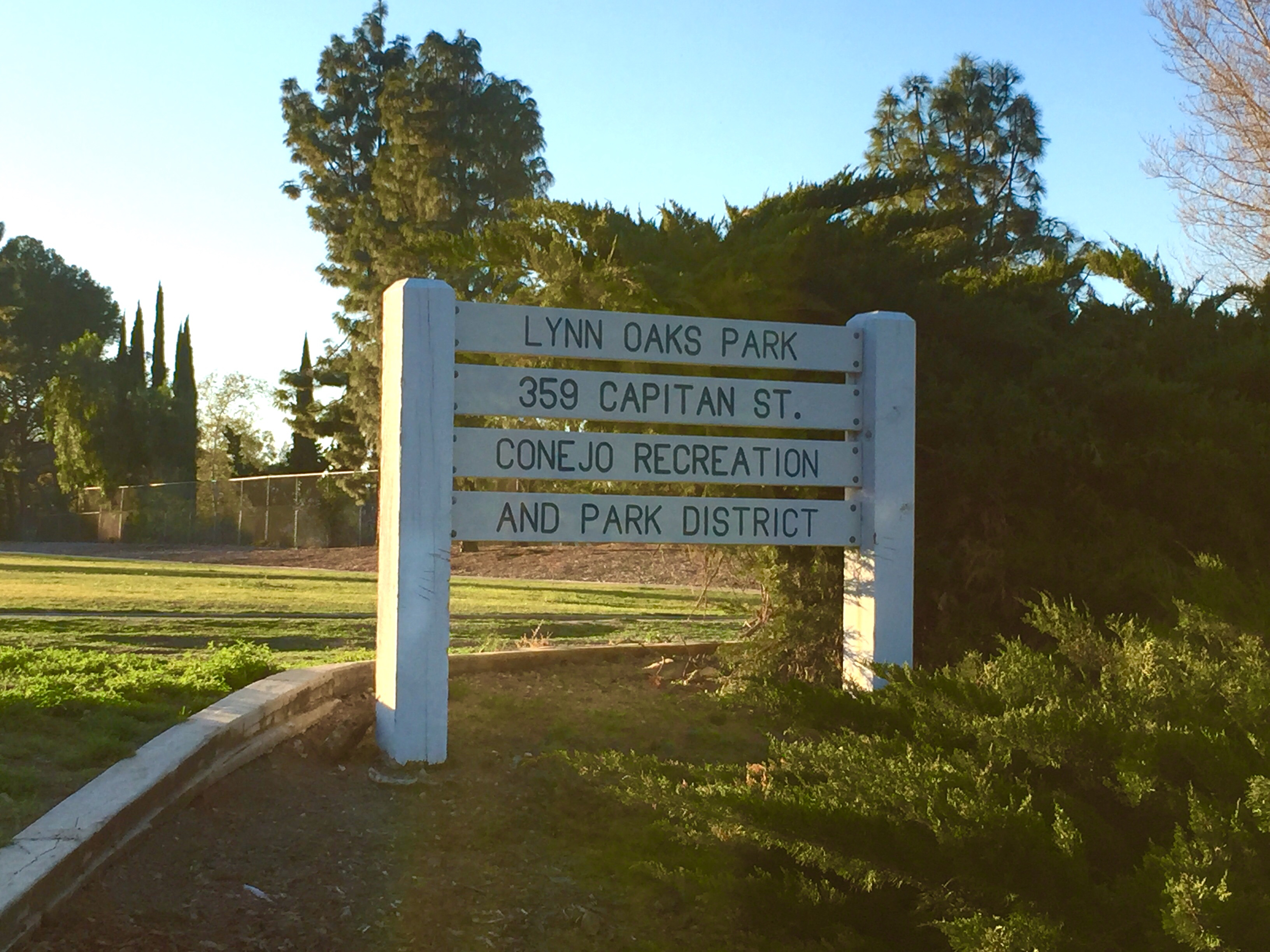
- Sign by entrance
- Interactive map of Lynn Oaks Park
- Type: Community park
- Location: 350 Capitan Street; Newbury Park, CA 91360
- Coordinates: 34°10′29.7″N 118°54′09.3″W
- Area: 7 acres (2.8 ha)
- Created: 1983
- Operator: Conejo Recreation & Park District (CRPD)
- Status: Open daily 7:00am to 8:00pm

Lynn Oaks Park is a seven-acre community park in the southern part of Newbury Park, California, which includes trails to numerous surrounding nature areas, including but not limited to the Hope Nature Preserve, Hidden Valley, and the Santa Monica Mountains National Recreation Area. It was first developed as a community park in 1983 and is named for its many oak trees. The park contains a volleyball court, outdoor basketball court, soccer field, a playground, barbecue grills, water fountains and numerous picnic tables. Some of the trails include the shorter Spring Canyon Trail and Oak Creek Canyon Loop, while the Los Robles Trail connects Lynn Oaks Park to the Hope Nature Preserve and beyond to Hidden Valley and the Santa Monica Mountains National Recreation Area.
