= Circle X Ranch =

Park unit located in the Santa Monica Mountains National Recreation Area

Coordinates: 34.1090°N 118.9364°W

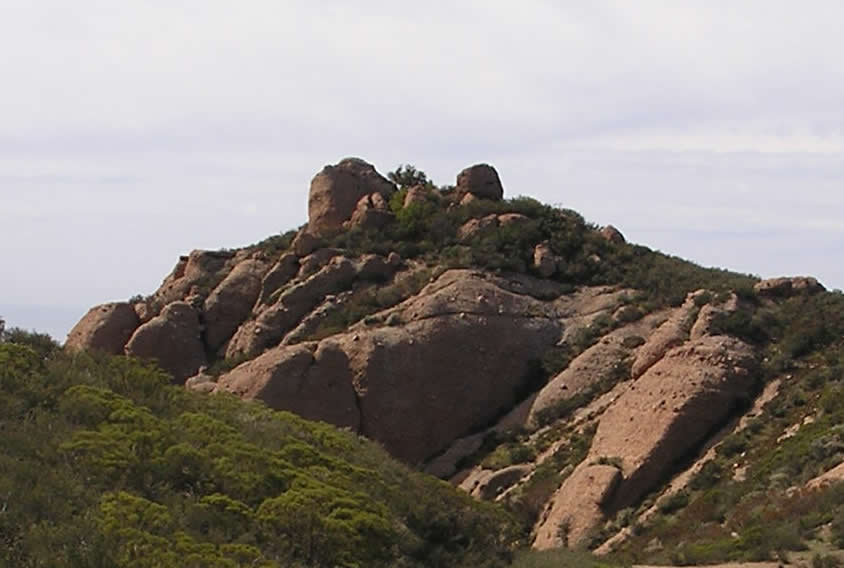
Boney Peak in Circle X Ranch

Circle X Ranch is a park unit located in the Triunfo Pass within the southwestern Santa Monica Mountains National Recreation Area, in Ventura County, California. It is located in the western Santa Monica Mountains.

Sandstone Peak, the highest peak in the range, and Boney Peak, are in the park with trails to their summits. Views can include the Channel Islands, Mount Baldy, and the Topatopa Mountains.

The park was formerly Camp Circle X, a Boy Scout camp. The northeast section is adjacent to the Boney Mountain Wilderness in Point Mugu State Park.

== Recreation ==
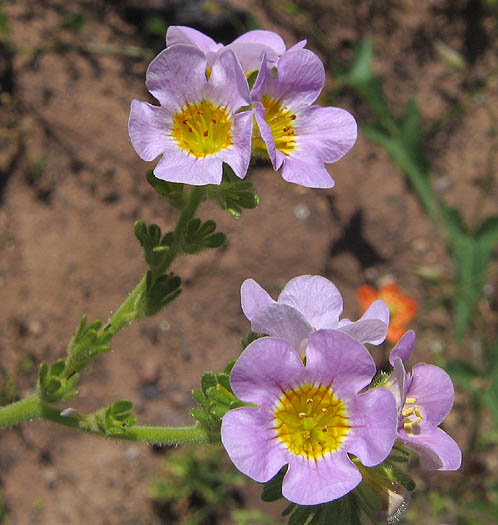
Shortlobe phacelia (Phacelia brachyloba) on the Mishe Mokwa Trail.

The park's Sandstone Peak Trail, Mishe Mokwa Trail, and others lead to high mountain vistas, riparian canyons with streams, and through chaparral and oak woodland habitats. The park is locally popular for The Grotto, a naturally 'enclosed' waterfall and wading pool.

Facilities include a ranch house with the Circle X Ranger Station, and a group campground, and many trailheads.

== See also ==
- California coastal sage and chaparral ecoregion
  - Coastal sage scrub
- California montane chaparral and woodlands ecoregion
  - California oak woodlands
