= Big Sycamore Canyon =

Canyon in the Santa Monica Mountains in Ventura County, California

Coordinates: 34.118°N 119.005°W

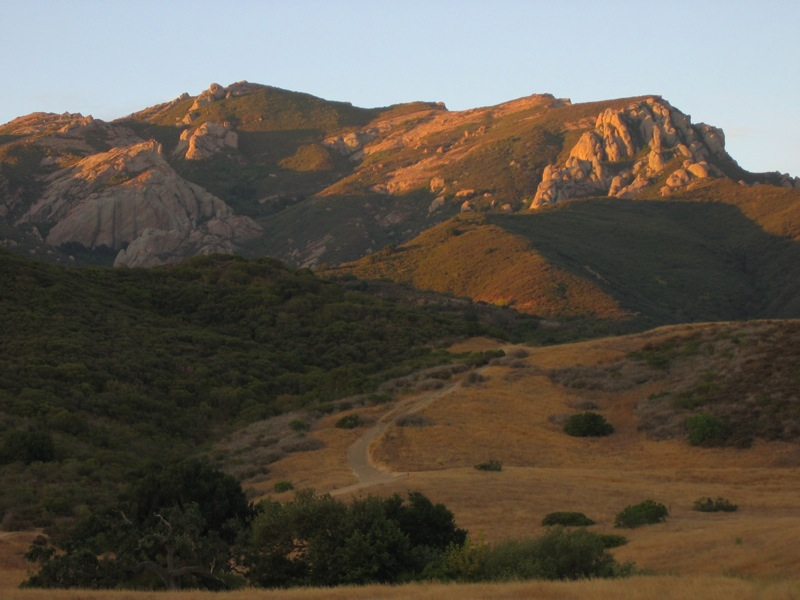
Boney Mountain and the Backbone Trail in Sycamore Canyon, Newbury Park.

Big Sycamore Canyon, often shortened to Sycamore Canyon, is a major feature of Point Mugu State Park, in Ventura County, California, United States. Sycamore Canyon is situated in the northernmost region of the Santa Monica Mountains National Recreation Area below the 3,000 feet (910 m) peaks of the Boney Mountain State Wilderness Area. The canyon begins on the north slope of Boney Mountain and heads north down the slope. The canyon then heads southwest past Rancho Sierra Vista/Satwiwa to Sycamore Cove on the coastline. The canyon in the park is one of the riparian woodlands along the California coast. It contains a number of California sycamore trees.

As a primary pathway through the Santa Monica Mountains between the Conejo Valley and the coast, Big Sycamore Canyon Trail is a popular trail. The sycamore-lined canyon is close to numerous trailheads, including the Backbone Trail. Other nearby trails include the Satwiwa Loop, Mishe Mokwa, Overlook Trail, Lower Big Sycamore Trail, and Wood Canyon Trail.

Big Sycamore Canyon was for thousands of years a popular trading route connecting the Conejo Valley to the Pacific Ocean through the Santa Monica Mountains for the Ventureño Chumash and Tongva people who inhabited the area for thousands of years. At the top of the canyon is the Satwiwa Native American Indian Culture Center located in the historic Satwiwa village site adjacent to Rancho Sierra Vista in southern Newbury Park.
