= Triunfo Pass =

Mountain pass over the Santa Susana Mountains in Ventura County, California

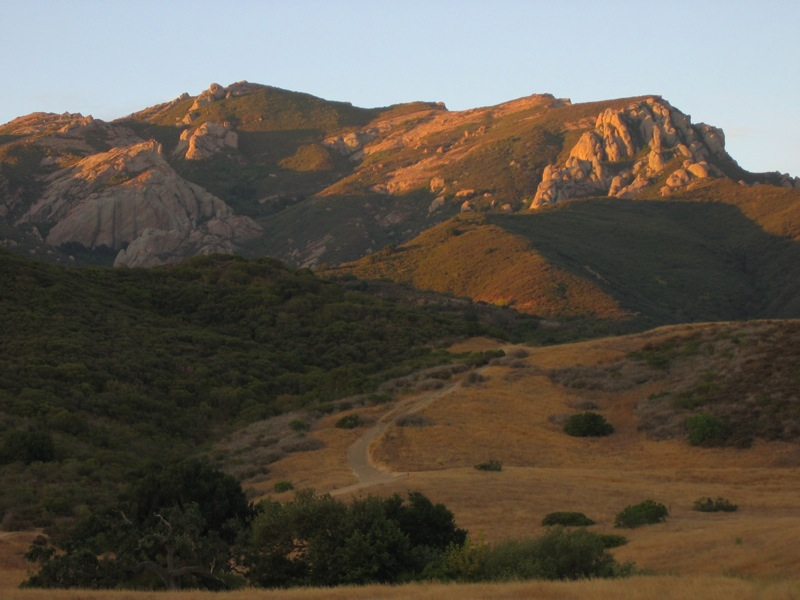
- Boney Peak, in Circle X Ranch Park near Triunfo Pass.
- Interactive map of Triunfo Pass

Third Approach
- Location: Yerba Buena Road, Ventura County, California
- Range: Santa Monica Mountains
- Coordinates: 34.11333°N 118.91556°W

The Triunfo Pass is a mountain pass in the Santa Monica Mountains, located on Yerba Buena Road in southeastern Ventura County, Southern California.

Automobile access to Circle X Ranch Park, part of the Santa Monica Mountains National Recreation Area, is on the west side of the pass.

The pass is the site of an earth station.

== See also ==
- Santa Monica Mountains topics
