= Hope Nature Preserve =

Coordinates: 34.168°N 118.897°W

Hope Nature Preserve is a 360-acre (150 ha) nature preserve in Newbury Park, California. It was a gift to the city from its owner, actor Bob Hope, whom it is named for. It is located by the Newbury Park-Thousand Oaks “border” in southern Conejo Valley. It is home to a variety of wildlife, including mountain lions, gray fox, bobcats, coyotes, deer, rabbits, and more. The Los Robles Trail provides the principal access, but it can also be visited from a trailhead in Lynn Oaks Park. It connects to a variety of protected open-space areas, including Ventu Park, Deer Ridge, Los Vientos, Los Padres, and many more.
