= Boney Peak =

Mountain in California, United States

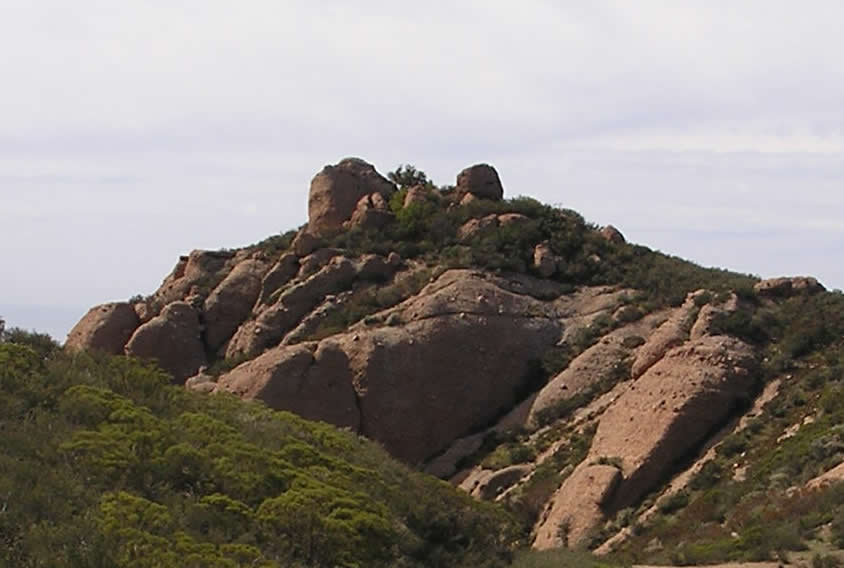
- The peak viewed from the trail to the northeast

Highest point
- Elevation: 2828 ft (862 m) NAVD 88
- Listing: Sierra Club LPC
- Coordinates: 34°06′59″N 118°56′26″W

Geography
- Location: Ventura County, California, U.S.
- Parent range: Santa Monica Mountains
- Topo map: USGS Triunfo Pass

Climbing
- Easiest route: via Backbone Trail and spur

Boney Mountain, also known as Boney Peak, is one of the highest peaks in the Santa Monica Mountains. The mountain is located in Ventura County, California and is 2,825 feet (861 m) in height. The highest summit in the Santa Monica Mountains, Sandstone Peak, is situated less than a mile northeast of Boney Peak along the same ridge of volcanic rock. It is the top section of a mass of volcanic rock which solidified around 15 million years ago, and was later uplifted to its dominant position, overshadowing western Conejo Valley.

Boney Peak is located in the Circle X Ranch Park, within the Santa Monica Mountains National Recreation Area. The surrounding Boney Mountain State Wilderness Area lies within the eastern portion of Point Mugu State Park. Boney Mountain State Wilderness includes trail access to the rest of Point Mugu State Park, as well as Big Sycamore Canyon and Rancho Sierra Vista/Satwiwa Native American Indian Culture Center. Hiking trails from Satwiwa Native American Cultural Center in southernmost Newbury Park reach Boney Mountain and Peak, and feature views of the Pacific Ocean, Channel Islands, and Mount Baldy. Nearby trails lead to Danielson Monument and the Sycamore Canyon Waterfall.

The Chumash people have a long and deeply spiritual history at and near the mountain, and they consider the mountain sacred. Boney Mountain was described by Chumash Indians to anthropologist John P. Harrington around 1900:

Early one morning in 9080 B.C., the ancestral grandfather from whom I took my name, headed west on one of his most adventurous hunting trips ever... As the group climbed Old Boney, they looked back to the north and could see the pleasant openings of the Conejo- and Hidden Valleys. There, there appeared to be good grazing ground for the mammoth herd and they proceeded thence.

The story may be a lore related to the Paleo-Indians, the distant ancestors of the Chumash. An ancient Chumash village known as Satwiwa was located at the foothills of the mountain, which remains sacred to the Chumash people. Satwiwa is believed to be first inhabited 13,000 years ago, and was still a Chumash inhabitation site as of 2,000 years ago.

In 2019, newspaper photos showed the peak was frosted with snow. Long time Newbury Park residents stated that it was the first time they had seen snow on the peak.

== See also ==
- Triunfo Pass
- Circle X Ranch
- Santa Monica Mountains
- California coastal sage and chaparral ecoregion
