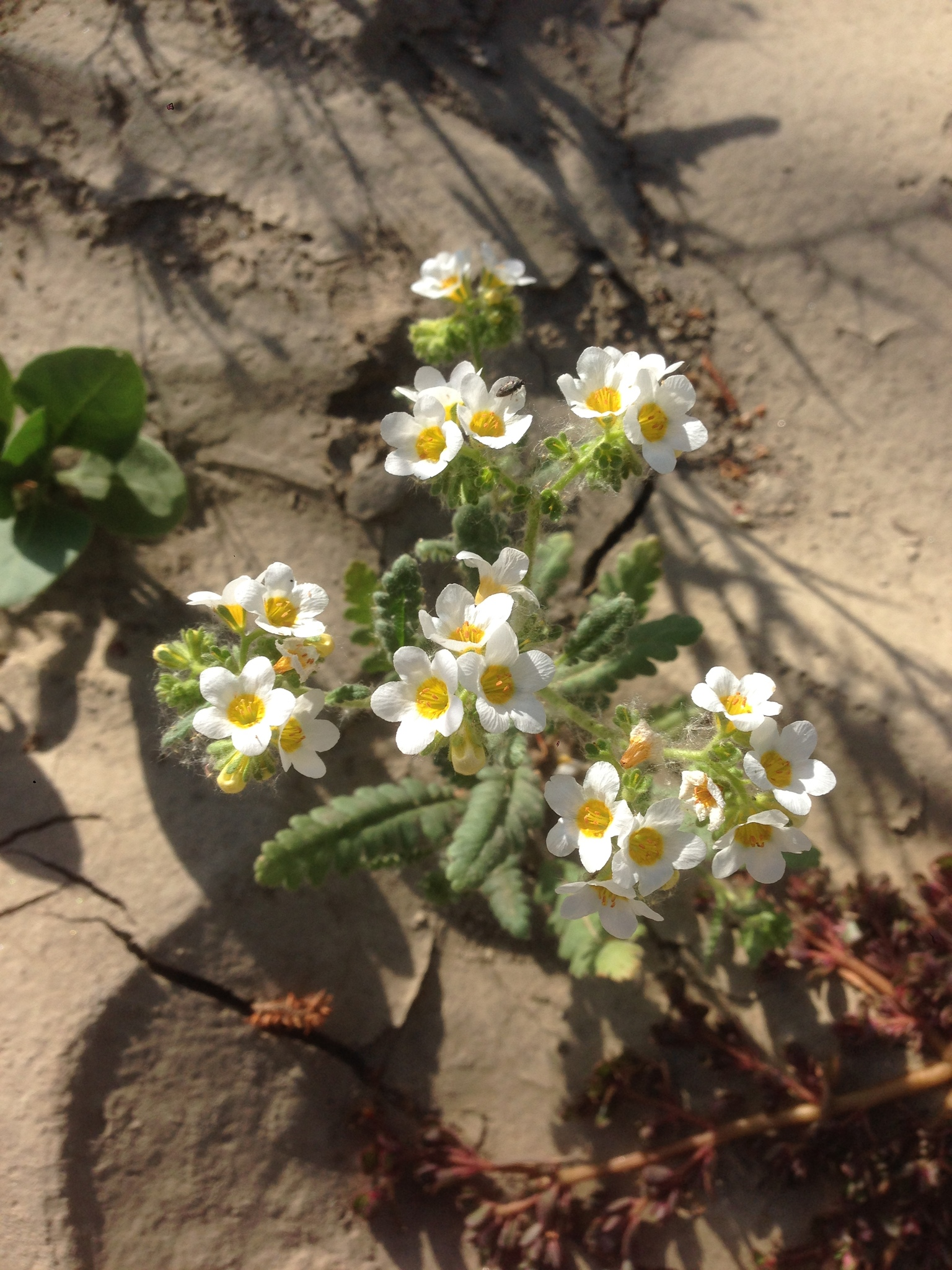
- Ventura County, California, 2017

Scientific classification
- Kingdom: Plantae
- Clade: Tracheophytes
- Clade: Angiosperms
- Clade: Eudicots
- Clade: Asterids
- Order: Boraginales
- Family: Hydrophyllaceae
- Genus: Phacelia
- Species: P. brachyloba

Binomial name
- Phacelia brachyloba (Benth.) A.Gray

= Phacelia brachyloba =

Species of plant

Phacelia brachyloba is a species of phacelia known by the common name shortlobe phacelia. It is native to southern California and Baja California, where it grows in the coastal mountains, canyons, and valleys. It is one of the many species known as fire followers, that emerge in areas recently burned.

It is an annual herb growing erect to a maximum height near 60 centimeters. It is hairy and glandular. The lance-shaped leaves are lobed or divided into lobed leaflets. The hairy, glandular inflorescence is a one-sided curving or coiling cyme of many funnel- or bell-shaped flowers. Each flower is up to a centimeter wide with a lavender, pink, or white corolla and a yellow throat.

There are reports that glandular hairs of stems, flowers and leaves of Phacelia brachyloba secrete oil droplets that can cause an unpleasant skin rash (contact dermatitis) in some people.

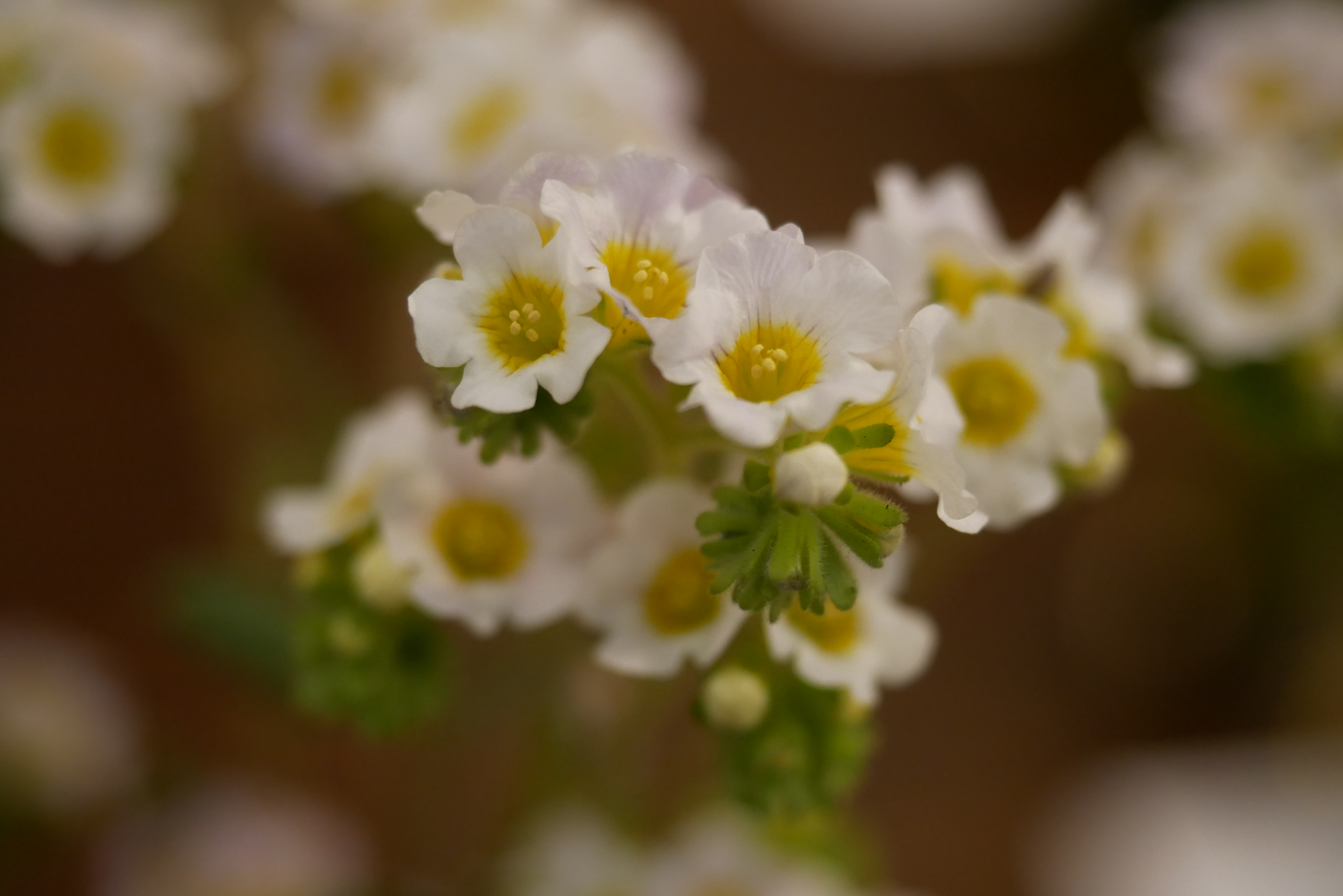
Shortlobe phacelia with white corolla
