= Hidden Valley, Ventura County, California =

Unincorporated community in California, United States

Coordinates: 34.148°N 118.912°W

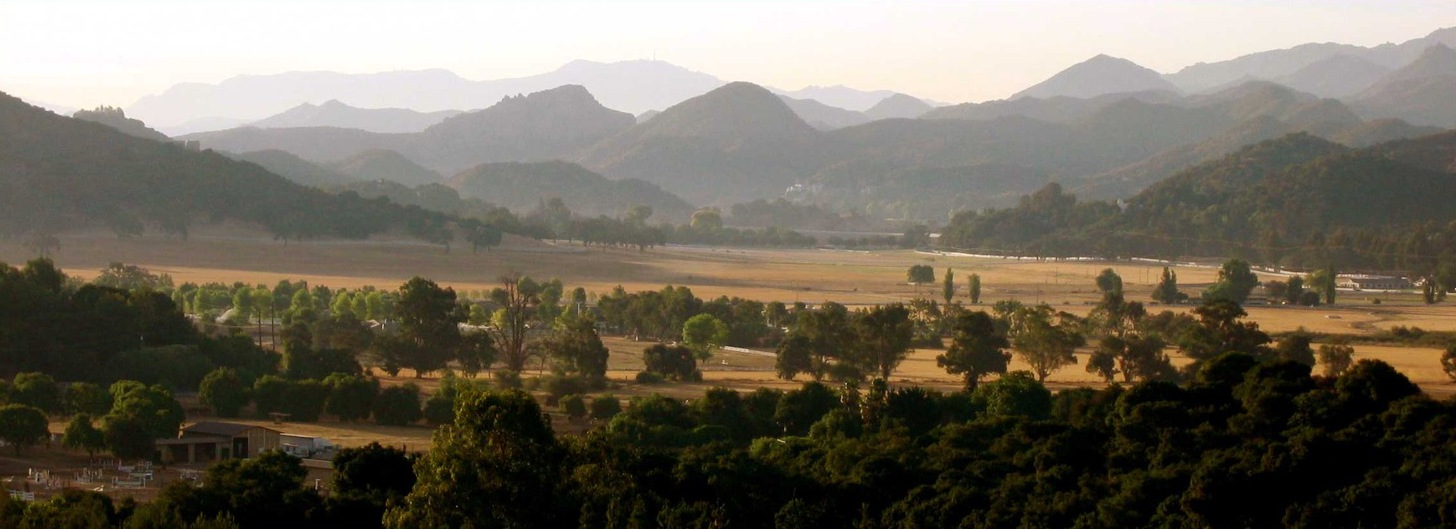
Dos Vientos Ranch — Hidden Valley and the Santa Monica Mountains

Hidden Valley is a valley in the Santa Monica Mountains, in southeastern Ventura County, Southern California. The unincorporated community in the valley is an equestrian ranch community with single family houses on 20-acre or more (8.1 ha) parcels of land. Residents rely on wells as the Hidden Valley Municipal Water District does not provide drinking water.

== Geography ==
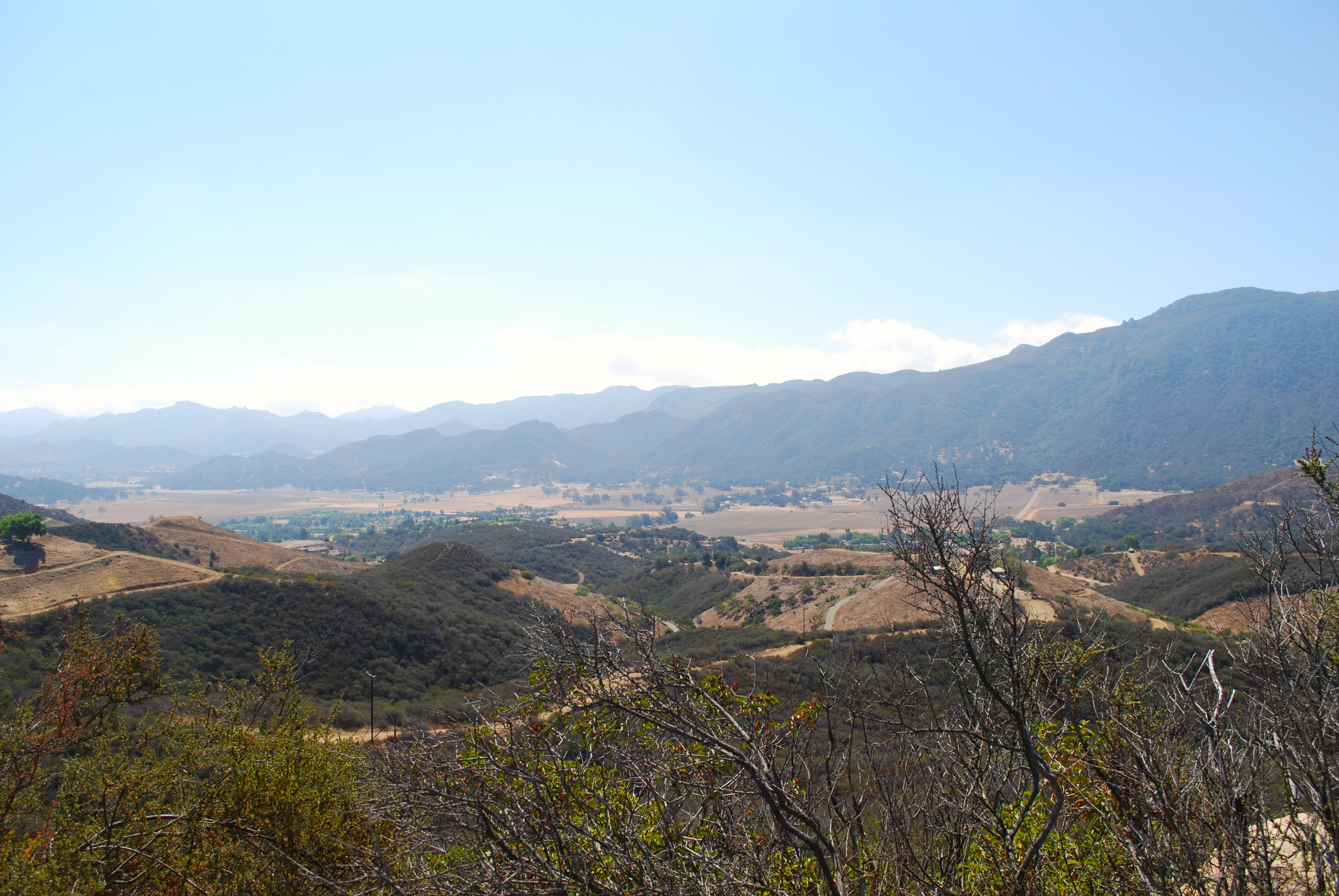
Hidden Valley as seen from Angel Vista, Newbury Park

Hidden Valley is bordered by Lake Sherwood to the east, Newbury Park to the west and north, and the Santa Monica Mountains National Recreation Area to the south. It is located south of the Conejo Valley, near the northwestern border of Los Angeles County.

== Popular culture ==
Hidden Valley is popular for filming movies and television shows due to its proximity to Los Angeles, such as:

- the home of President Charles Logan in the television series 24, seasons 5 and 6
- much of the film Seabiscuit
- the original site for Greg Sumner's and Gary Ewing's ranches on Knots Landing
- location scenes for American Horror Story: Asylum
- the video for "Forever Young" by Rod Stewart, shot on Potrero Road in Hidden Valley
- the site of the Rosemoor Zoological Park in We Bought a Zoo
- the site of Perry Mason's family home in Perry Mason (2020)

== Notable people ==
- Ronald Colman owned a ranch in the valley which was later owned by Eve Arden and renamed Westhaven. It was then bought by Sophia Loren, who called it La Concordia.
- Ellen DeGeneres and Portia de Rossi previously owned a horse ranch in the valley.
- Andrew Lee is an American entrepreneur, software developer and writer.
- Tom Selleck owns a ranch formerly of actor/singer Dean Martin.
- Britney Spears owns a villa at the White Stallion Estates in the valley.

== See also ==
- Circle X Ranch
- Flora of the Santa Monica Mountains
