= Rancho Sierra Vista =

Nature area in the Santa Monica Mountains

Coordinates: 34.1538°N 118.9644°W

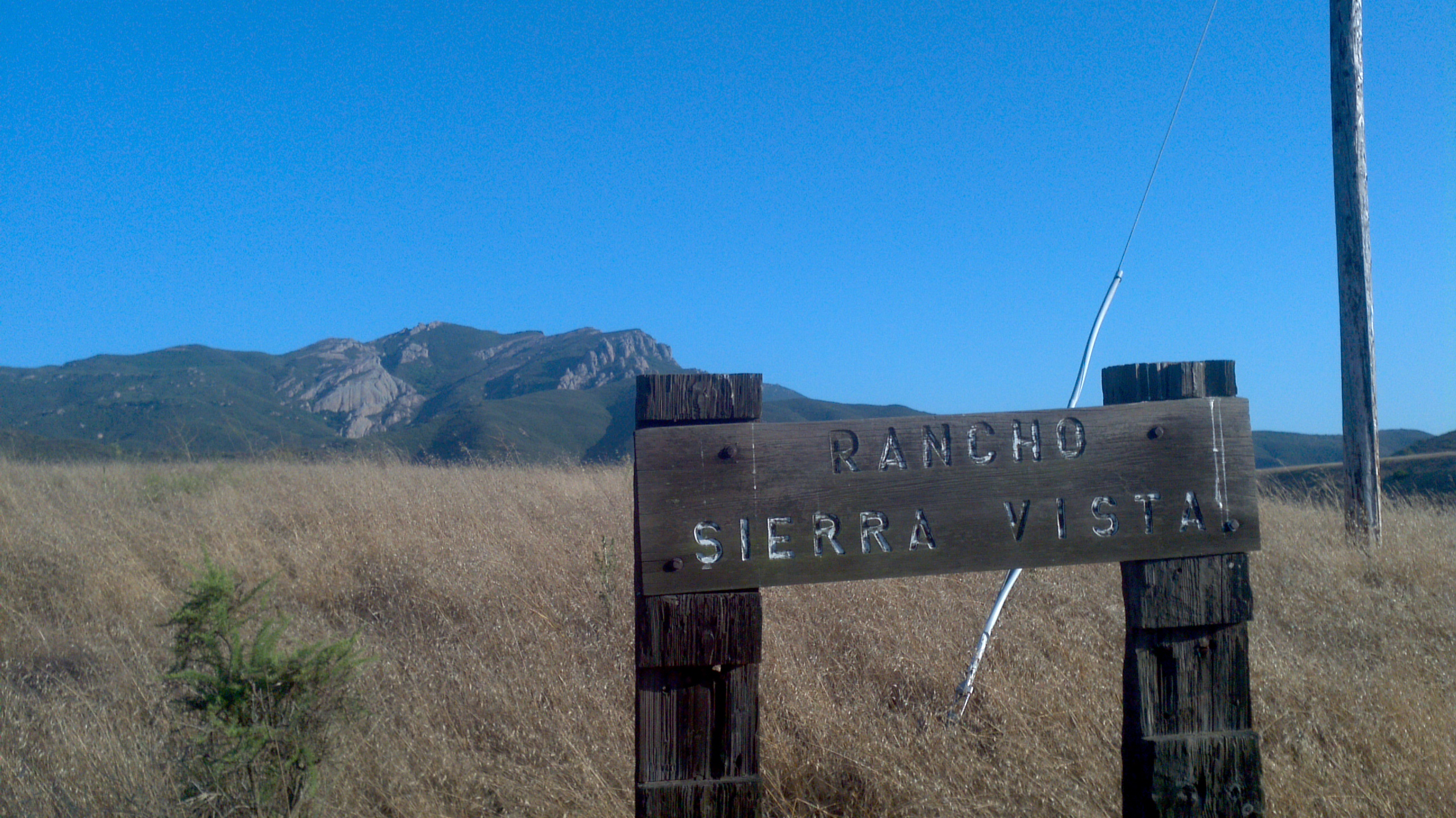
View of Rancho Sierra Vista with Boney Mountain in the background

Rancho Sierra Vista in Ventura County, California, United States, is one of the last intact ranches from the first half of the twentieth century in the Santa Monica Mountains. The majority of the landscape is much as it was 100 years ago. The area is now owned by the Santa Monica Mountains National Recreation Area, a unit of the National Park System.

Located adjacent to Newbury Park, it is home of Satwiwa Native American Indian Culture Center.

== Prehistory and European Contact ==
Over 150 archeological sites have been found indicating both permanent and transient occupation of the area by Native Americans. In 2014, glass beads were found at a small site exposed by the Springs Fire. This find possibly indicates contact in the late 1700s during the initial period of Spanish colonial occupation.

The first European land exploration of the area was the Portola Expedition of 1769-70. The horsemen portrayed in the Saddle Rock Ranch Pictographs in the heart of the Santa Monica Mountains are considered to be a representation of Portola's exploring party, and have been determined to be eligible as a National Historic Landmark. The expeditions led by Juan Bautista de Anza also travelled through the area, first in 1774 and then again in 1776. The Juan Bautista de Anza National Historic Trail passes through Rancho Sierra Vista.

== Rancho period, 1802–1870s ==
=== Rancho Las Virgenes, 1802 ===
Rancho Las Virgenes was a 17,760-acre land grant given to Miguel Ortega but was abandoned after his death in 1809. Nemecio Domínguez and Domingo Carrillo received a Mexican grant in 1834. The lands of the Rancho Las Vírgenes included present day Agoura Hills, Oak Park, and Westlake Village and part of the Santa Monica Mountains.

Lindero Canyon marked the boundary between this ranch and Rancho El Conejo. Lindero means "border" in Spanish. Medea Creek, a tributary of Malibu Creek, flows through the center of old Rancho Las Virgenes. Medea is an anglicization of the Spanish word medio meaning "middle".

=== Rancho El Conejo, 1803 ===
Local ranching history in the western Santa Monica Mountains began in 1803 when former soldiers Jose Polanco and Ignacio Rodriquez were granted Rancho El Conejo by the King of Spain.

=== Rancho Guadalasca, 1836 ===
Rancho Guadalasca was a 30,594-acre Mexican land grant given in 1836 by Governor Mariano Chico to Ysabel Yorba.

The Rancho Guadalasca portion of the area now known as Rancho Sierra Vista was sold in 1871 by Ysabel Yorba. The southern part of the rancho was purchased by William Richard Broome in 1871. His son, Thornhill Francis Broome, is the namesake for Thornhill Broome Beach in Point Mugu State Park.

== Beal period, 1936–1946 ==
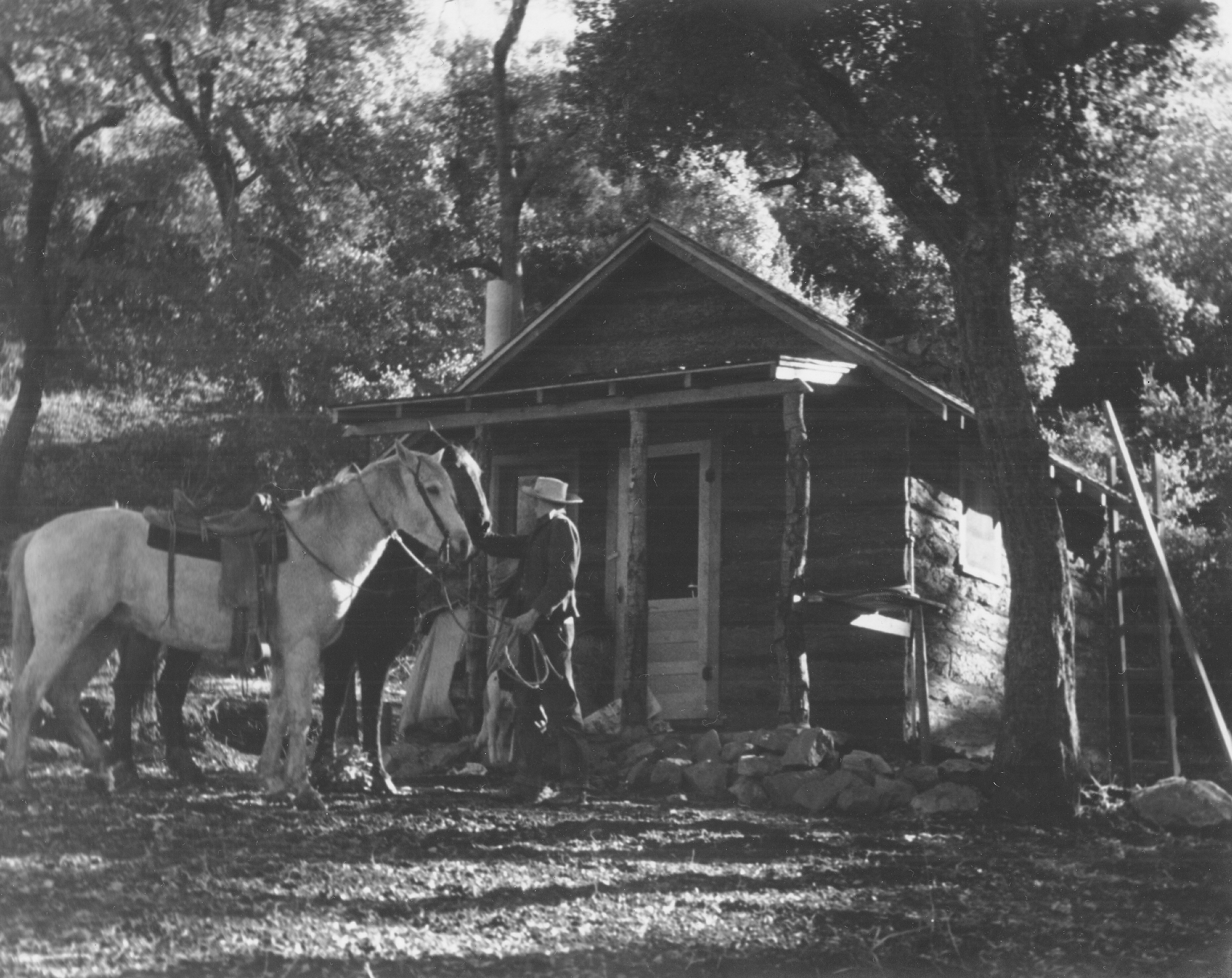
Cabin at Live Oaks Spring, Rancho Sierra Vista, January 5, 1939

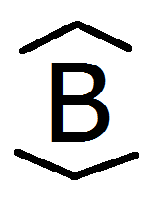
Cattle Brand used at Rancho Sierra Vista

Wealthy petroleum geologist Carl Beal purchased the northern section of the old rancho in 1936 and christened the area Rancho Sierra Vista, meaning Mountain View Ranch in Spanish. Beal constructed most of the current ranch buildings and his house and barbecue pit in Sycamore Canyon in what is now Point Mugu State Park.

Beal explored the ranch for water and developed a system of dams, wells, springs, and reservoirs that provided the water for a variety of agricultural products and horses. He was the person responsible for building 25 miles of roads and 18 wells feeding the 14 miles of steel pipe that is seen alongside today's trails. Water for his avocados was brought in by pipe from a spring at Boney Mountain. Near this spring was a cabin. Beal was probably not the person who built the cabin, but he and his son used it as their hunting cabin. It has since been destroyed by fire and only the foundation and chimney remain.

The Beals were well known for hosting parties and barbecues at Rancho Sierra Vista which often included riding and other sports.

The Beals also reported having problems with escaped patients from the nearby Camarillo State Hospital. In 1940 Carl Beal reported that escapees found on his ranch had threatened to kill him and had started wildfires.

== Danielson period, 1947–1980 ==
In 1947 Richard E. Danielson (1913-1988) purchased 7,793 acres of Rancho Sierra Vista from the estate of Carlton Beal, the son of Carl Beal. Danielson was the great grandson of the founder of International Harvester and had inherited a substantial fortune. He and his family lived primarily in Los Angeles and visited Rancho Sierra Vista only occasionally, for weekends or holidays. Danielson is responsible for completing the ranch house, including the swimming pool, and paving twelve miles of roads. Danielson is reputed to have been a staunch advocate of water conservation and rural land preservation. He built a dam on the property to conserve water which was used to irrigate lemon groves, and became the largest individual lemon grower in California. He also raised cattle, sheep and quarter horses.

Danielson is reported to have "preserved the early Spanish atmosphere [of Rancho Sierra Vista] by employing true Mexican vaqueros to handle their large herd of Hereford Cattle."

Between 1972 and 1973 Danielson donated 5,585 acres of his ranch to the state of California which became Point Mugu State Park. In 1980 Danielson sold 850 acres containing the horse ranch to the National Park Service. It became one of the first acquisition of the newly created Santa Monica Mountains National Recreation Area. Danielson died December 27, 1988, and was buried near the cabin site. Plots are reserved there for the rest of his family. The "Peace, Love and Joy" artwork marks the location.

== NPS period, 1980–present ==
National Park Service trail map of Rancho Sierra Vista

The Santa Monica Mountains National Recreation Area purchased the area in 1980. The site is now home to a native plant nursery, the park's horse stable, and the Satwiwa Native American Indian Culture Center. It is also a popular starting point for hikers, equestrians, and mountain bikers exploring Point Mugu State Park and Boney Mountain. The Wendy Drive Trailhead can also be used to access Rancho Sierra Vista, Point Mugu State Park, as well as the 25 miles of the Los Robles Trail system, which is administered by the Conejo Open Space Conservation Agency.

From 1983 to 1994, Moorpark College used Rancho Sierra Vista for their Equestrian Training and Management Program, stabling and training over 100 horses on site.

According to the National Parks Conservation Association, "the majority of the barns, equipment sheds, wells, and staff residences from this period (1936-1946) remain, making Rancho Sierra Vista historically significant as one of the last intact 20th-century ranches in the Santa Monica Mountains." Moreover, the site is eligible for entry in the National Register of Historic Places, but as of 2008 has not yet been nominated.

A restoration project to bring back critical habitat for birds and other animals had already been started when in May 2013, the Springs Fire burned nearly 70 percent of Rancho Sierra Vista. From January to March 2014, a team of volunteers planting 24,000 plants to help restore the area with native plants such as coast live oak trees and flowering purple sage. By restoring the plant community that existed before ranching practices changed the area, they expect the area to be less prone to wildfires.

== See also ==
- Satwiwa
- Santa Monica Mountains National Recreation Area
- Boney Mountain State Wilderness Area
