= Point Mugu State Park =

Park in California, U.S.

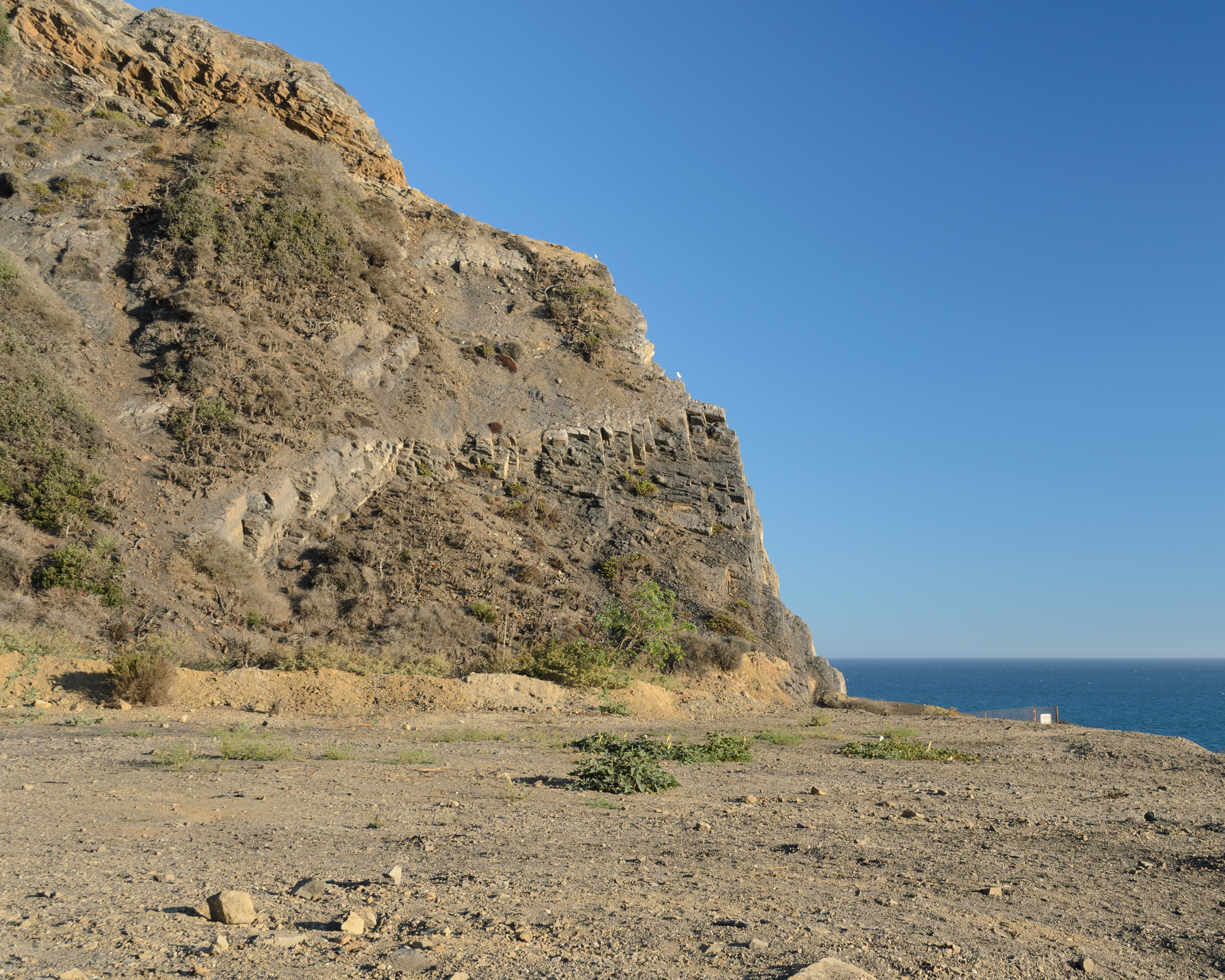
- Mugu Rock, Point Mugu State Park

- Location within California Location within the United States
- Nearest city: Malibu, California
- Coordinates: 34°6′N 119°0′W
- Governing body: California Department of Parks and Recreation

Point Mugu State Park is a state park located in the Santa Monica Mountains National Recreation Area in Southern California. The rugged, nearly impassible shoreline of the western Santa Monica Mountains gives way to tidal lagoons and coastal sand dunes at Mugu Rock. The western edge of the park adjoins Mugu Lagoon which is a protected area within Naval Air Station Point Mugu.

Point Mugu SP consists of distinct landside and beachside areas with different ecosystems and their own parking lots, separated by the Pacific Coast Highway. During low tide, the parks are joined by a walkway under an adjoining bridge. The park may be accessed from the eastern part of the Santa Monica Mountains from Rancho Sierra Vista, a National Park Service park, in Newbury Park, California that includes the Satwiwa Native American Indian Culture Center, and from the western part of the Santa Monica Mountains by the Pacific Coast Highway.

== Features ==
Point Mugu State Park features 5 miles (8.0 km) of oceanfront beaches, palisades, chaparral-covered mountains, two major canyons with seasonal rivers, grassy valleys highlighted with oaks, sycamores, and the occasional native walnuts trees. A major landmark, the Boney Mountain State Wilderness Area features pinnacles visible from many areas of the park.

== Recreation ==
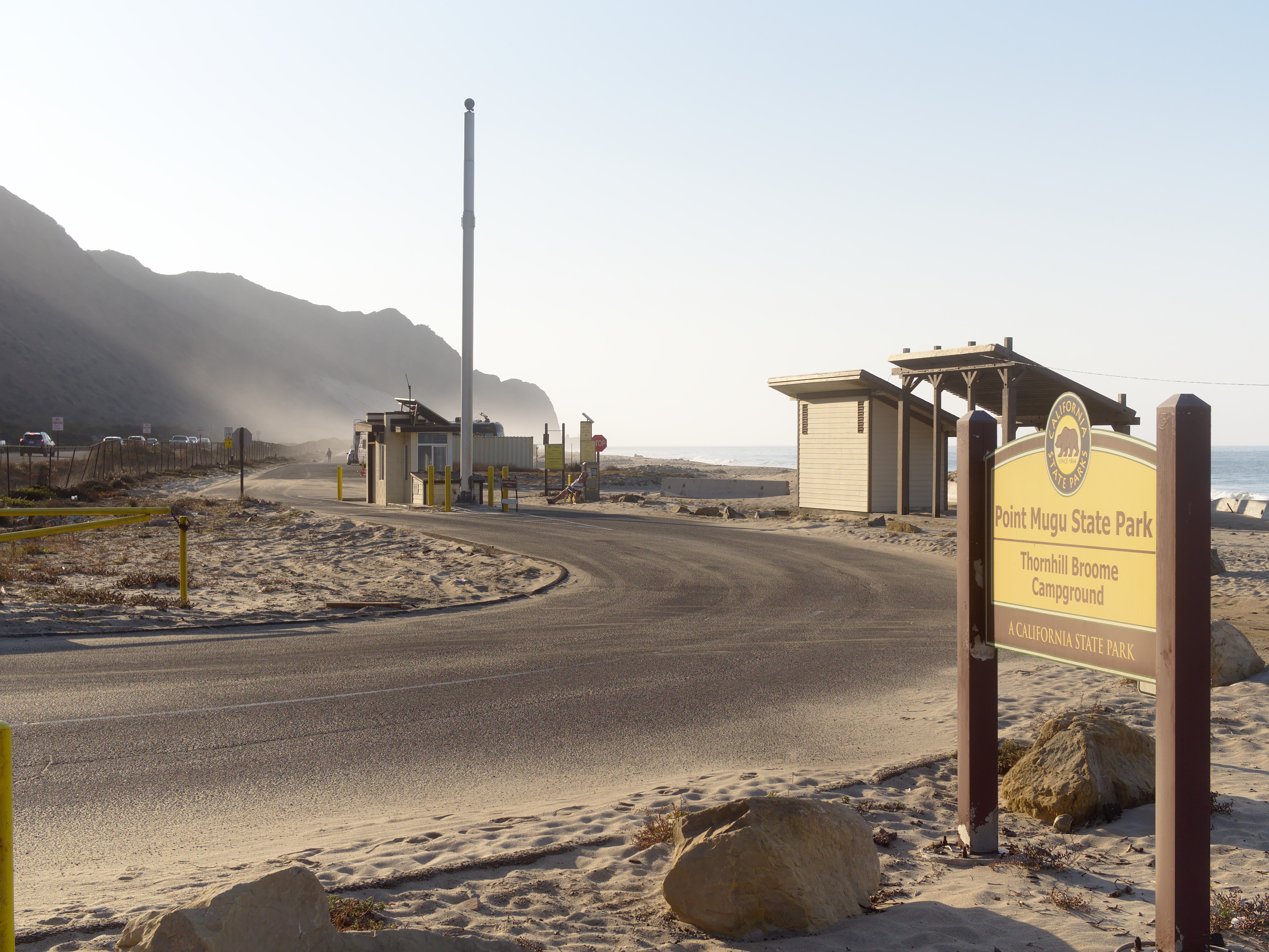
Entrance to Thornhill Broome Campground

Opportunities for camping, hiking, swimming, mountain biking, picnicking, wildlife viewing, and horseback riding exist within the park. Horseback riding is available from the National Park Service entrance. Like all California State Parks, dogs are permitted when leashed in campsite areas. No dogs are allowed whether on or off-leash on the backcountry trails, i.e., any trail that is not paved. The western terminus of the Backbone Trail, a multi-use long-distance trail extending nearly 70 miles (110 km) across the Santa Monica Mountains, is the Ray Miller trailhead at La Jolla Canyon in Point Mugu State Park. Sycamore Cove, La Jolla Beach and Mugu Beach have parking and sandy beaches. Views of dolphins, seals, pelicans, and whales are possible all along Pacific Coast Highway. No fishing as of 2011.

== Geography ==
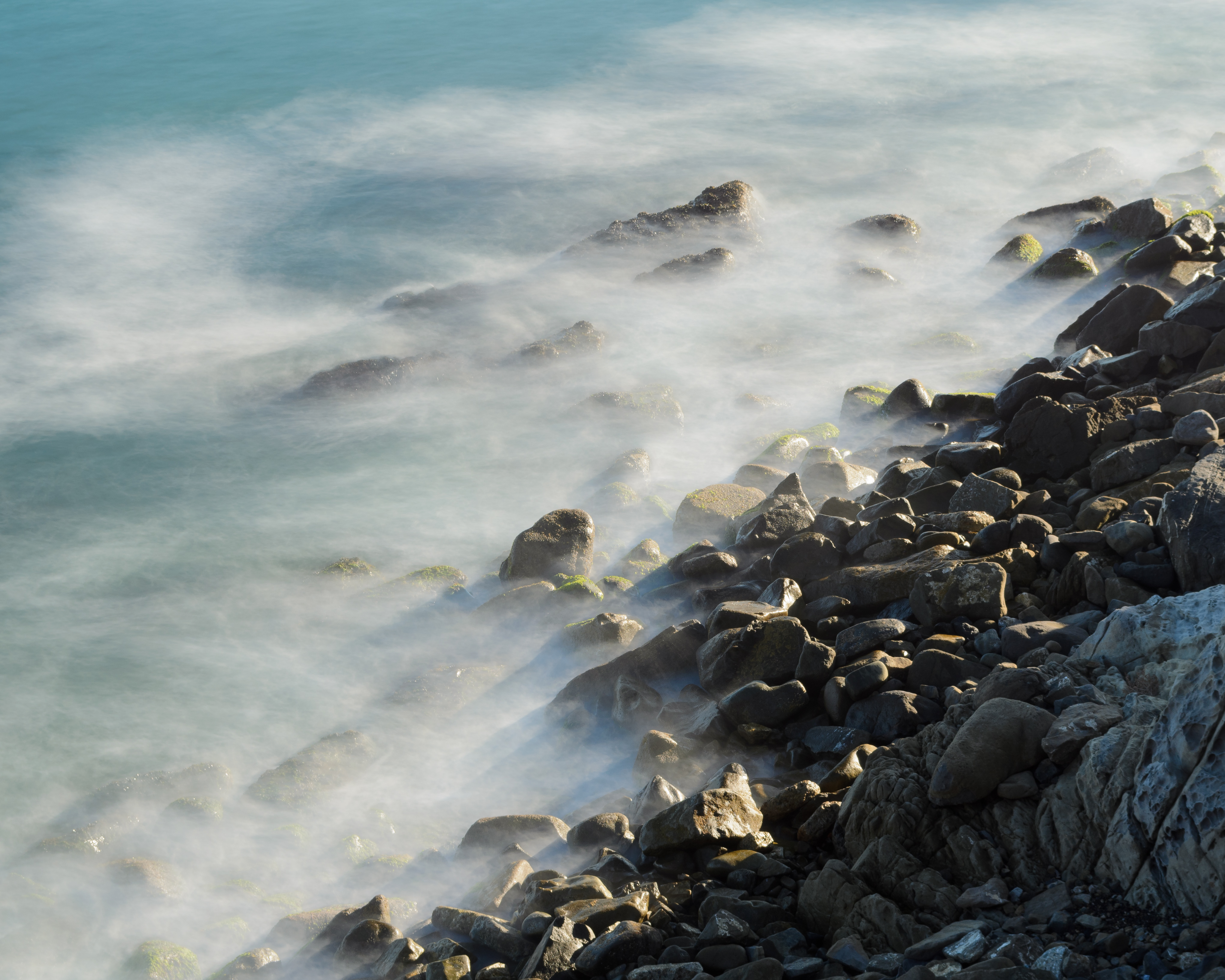
View of the Pacific Ocean in Point Mugu State Park

=== Canyons and valleys ===
- Wood Canyon
- Sycamore Canyon
- La Jolla Valley
- Serrano Valley

=== Mountains ===
- Boney Mountain — Boney Mountain Wilderness area, Boney Peak adjacent
- Tri Peaks
- Mugu Peak
- Laguna Peak

== See also ==
- List of beaches in California
- List of California state parks
