= Point Mugu =

Promontory within Point Mugu State Park in Ventura County, California

- Cape
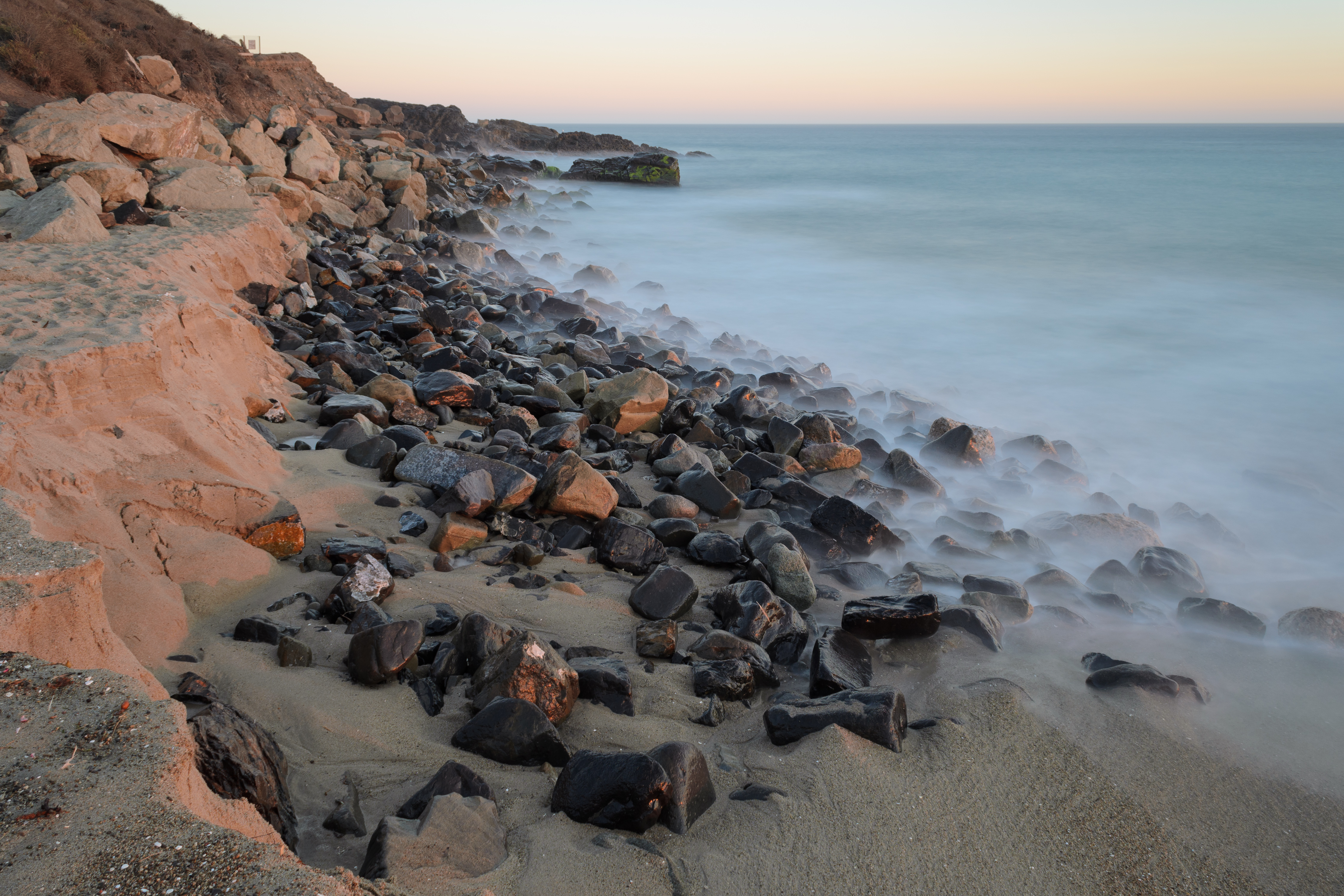
- Pacific Ocean at Point Mugu

- Location within California
- Coordinates: 34°5′8″N 119°3′36″W
- Location: Point Mugu State Park, Ventura County, California
- Water bodies: Pacific Ocean
- Elevation: 14 m (46 ft)
- GNIS feature ID: 247643

Point Mugu (/muːˈɡuː/, Chumash: Muwu) is a cape or promontory within Point Mugu State Park on the Pacific Coast in Ventura County, California, United States, near the cities of Port Hueneme and Oxnard. The name is believed to be derived from the Chumash Indian term "Muwu", meaning "beach", which was first mentioned by Cabrillo in his journals in 1542. Mugu Lagoon is a salt marsh just upcoast from the promontory within the Naval Base Ventura County formerly called the Naval Air Station Point Mugu.

== History ==
The name derives from Muwu (Ventureño: "Beach"), which was the name of a Chumash village at Point Mugu during pre-colonial times. The village of Muwu (CA-VEN-11) had the highest population of any coastal Chumash settlements along the Santa Monica Mountains. Muwu was a ceremonial center and the ancient capital of Lulapin, a major political unit of Chumash territory which stretched from modern day Los Angeles County to Santa Barbara in the north. The territory stretched for 60 mi (97 km) along the coast, and at least half as far inland. Mission records indicate that 191 inhabitants were baptized in Muwu, more than any other Chumash village by the Santa Monica Mountains. The last chief of Muwu, Mariano Wataitset, son of Halashu (Big Chief of Muwu), was baptized at Mission San Buenaventura in 1802.

On January 31, 2000, Alaska Airlines Flight 261 crashed off of Point Mugu, killing all 88 people on board the McDonnell Douglas MD-83 operating the flight.

== Mugu Rock ==
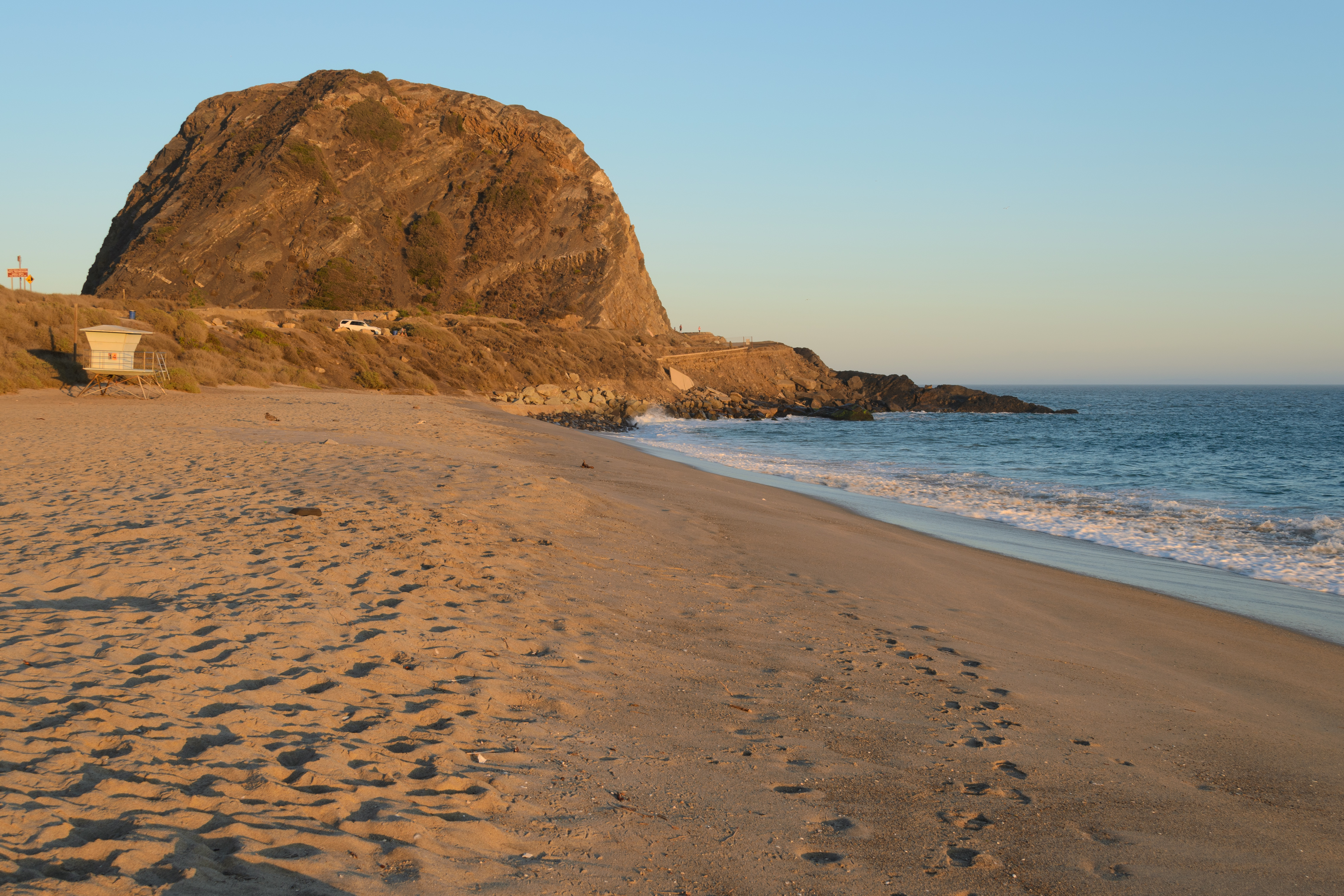
Mugu Rock, seen from the northwest

Mugu Rock is a distinctive feature of the coastal headland promontory that has been featured in many film shoots and television commercials. This igneous dike marks the western end of the Santa Monica Mountains, and the Rancho Guadalasca boundary. The rock was formed when the roadway was cut through the near-vertical ridge of resistant volcanic rock in 1937. A route had been blasted out around the promontory in 1923–24 to complete Pacific Coast Highway between Malibu and the Oxnard Plain. This replaced a narrow path around the rock and much of that roadway has since eroded away.

The site is a popular but dangerous place for fishing, sightseeing, cliff diving, and rock climbing up the sheer sides of the rock. On Thanksgiving Day 2008, three young men from Oxnard were swept to sea and killed by a rogue wave while surf watching from Mugu Rock.

Directly east of Mugu Rock is Point Mugu State Beach Campsite. The park has 5 miles (8 km) of shoreline and more than 70 miles (110 km) of hiking trails.
