= Palos Verdes Peninsula AVA =

American Viticultural Area in Los Angeles County, California

Coordinates: 33°44′57″N 118°22′46″W

Palos Verdes Peninsula
- Wine region
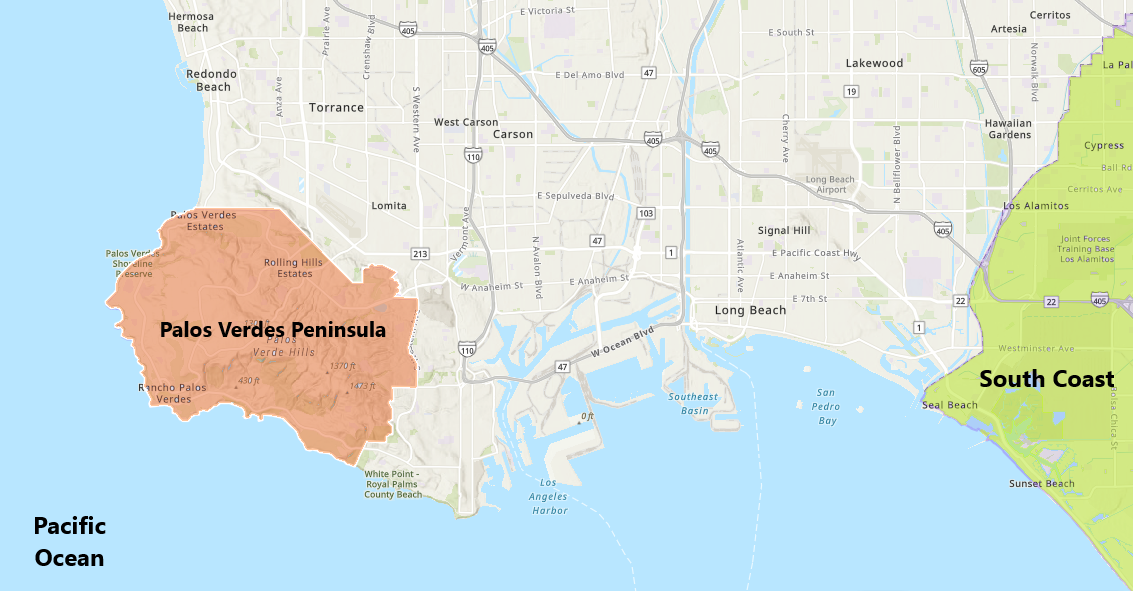
- Type: American Viticultural Area
- Year established: 2021
- Years of wine industry: 18
- Country: United States
- Part of: California, Los Angeles County
- Other regions in California, Los Angeles County: Antelope Valley of the California High Desert AVA, Leona Valley AVA, Malibu Coast AVA, Malibu-Newton Canyon AVA, Saddle Rock-Malibu AVA, Sierra Pelona Valley AVA
- Growing season: 322 days
- Climate region: Region I-IV
- Precipitation (annual average): 14.03 in (356 mm)
- Soil conditions: Rich in clays, adobe, and loamy clay with high amounts of calcium
- Total area: 15,900 acres (25 sq mi)
- Size of planted vineyards: 7 acres (2.8 ha)
- No. of vineyards: 8
- Grapes produced: Cabernet Sauvignon, Chardonnay, Merlot, Pinot Noir
- No. of wineries: 2

Palos Verdes Peninsula is an American Viticultural Area (AVA) located on the Pacific coast of Los Angeles County. It was established as the nation's 253^{rd}, the state's 142^{nd} and the county's seventh appellation on June 17, 2021 by the Alcohol and Tobacco Tax and Trade Bureau (TTB), Treasury after reviewing the petition submitted by James York, owner of Catalina View Wines, on behalf of the Palos Verdes Peninsula Winegrowers proposing a viticultural area named "Palos Verdes Peninsula."
The viticultural area encompasses 15,900 acres (25 sq mi) containing the cities of Palos Verdes Estates, Rolling Hills Estates, Rancho Palos Verdes and Rolling Hills. There are two commercial vineyards, Catalina View Wines and La Caze Family Vineyard, and at least six identifiable vineyards for personal use cultivating just over seven acres (2.8 ha) within the AVA. Palos Verdes Peninsula is bordered on the west and south by the Pacific Ocean. The northern and eastern boundaries of the AVA coincides with the jurisdictional boundaries of the cities of Palos Verdes Estates, Rolling Hills Estates, Rancho Palos Verdes, and the neighboring cities of Torrance, Lomita and San Pedro, respectively. Palos Verdes Peninsula viticultural area is not located within, nor does it contain, any established viticultural area.

== Name Evidence ==
Palos Verdes Peninsula (Spanish pronunciation: [/ˈpaloz ˈβeɾðes/] PA-los BER-des) takes its name from the Rancho de Los Palos Verdes, which was awarded as a Mexican land grant from the Governor Pío Pico to José Loreto and Juan Capistrano Sepúlveda of Alta California in the early 1800s. Use of the term "Palos Verdes Peninsula" to describe the region began during the mid-century development surge of the area. The petitioner provided several examples of the use of "Palos Verdes Peninsula" to refer to the region of the AVA. For example, many local agencies and organizations utilize the "Palos Verdes Peninsula" reference in their names: Palos Verdes Peninsula United School District, Palos Verdes Peninsula Transit Authority, Palos Verdes Peninsula Land Conservancy, Palos Verdes Peninsula News, and Palos Verdes Peninsula Chamber of Commerce. The petition also provided a list of several books that refer to the Palos Verdes Peninsula in their titles, including Handbook of Wildflowers, Weeds, Wildlife, and Weather of the South Bay and Palos Verdes Peninsula, and Best Hikes on the Palos Verdes Peninsula.

== History ==
The Sepulveda families were the first to cultivate the area. In the 1800s, while cattle ranching was the primary commerce, some land was cultivated for vegetables and grains. There is evidence of grapevines being planted in the greater Los Angeles area and at various adobes on the Peninsula as early as the mid-1800s. The vines grown on the Peninsula were probably transplanted from the area around the San Gabriel Mission. There is no evidence that the vines on the Peninsula were more than a source of grapes for family consumption or as an ornamental plant. By 1877, orchards and other semi-tropical fruits were being raised on the eastern slopes of the Peninsula, overlooking San Pedro Bay.

The first significant agriculture activity on the Hill was in the early 1900s, when Jotham Bixby leased land to tenant farmers to cultivate vegetables, beans, peas, tomatoes, and grains. Most of the leased land was on the "moist southern slopes of Portuguese Bend". At this time, there were many producing vineyards in Southern California, but no record of producing vineyards on the Peninsula. Anecdotal evidence suggests that at the turn of the century, Los Angeles County had significant vineyards that produced wine and brandy. A 1903 report by Louis Mesmer (USDA) indicates that nearly 5,000 acres (2,000 ha) of vineyards (4.5m vines) existed in the Los Angeles area and that 3,100 short tons (2,800 t) had been produced in 1902. Of these historic vineyards, only San Antonio Winery, established in 1917, still exists, although their grapes are now from vineyards elsewhere in California.

Following the early development of the western (Palos Verdes Estates) and eastern slopes (Miraleste) of the Peninsula, the primary agricultural areas were in the south, southwest and upper central areas. The Portuguese Bend, a south-facing rural area, was primarily "dry-farmed" with garbanzo beans, barley and some ornamental flowers. In a 1946 Professional Paper 207 on the geology of the Palos Verdes Hills, state that soils and climate on the lower part of the southwest, south and southeast slopes of the Peninsula are conducive to growing vegetables (tomatoes, squash, beans, peas, cucumbers and corn), whereas soils on the western upland slopes are favorable for barley, oats and pasture.

Before the start of World War II, Japanese farmers were the primary farmers on the Peninsula. Records at the Palos Verdes Peninsula Library Local History Collection show that there were as many as 70 Japanese families farming 3,500 acres (1,400 ha) on the Peninsula. Their principal farming activities included dry farming (garbanzo beans and barley) and flower cultivation in the lower terraces of the western Peninsula and greater Portuguese Bend area. There is no evidence of any producing vineyards on the Peninsula, but there is photographic evidence of some of the farmers having grape vines, probably at their houses. Today, even with a largely built-out suburban and semi-rural character, a handful of small agricultural operations remain in the Portuguese Bend and Rolling Hills areas, including vineyards, avocado and citrus orchards, organic vegetables, and dry farming. Produce from our vineyards, orchards and vegetable market gardens are often sold to local restaurants and event venues as "farm-to-table" resources, as well as local farmer's markets.

== Terroir ==
=== Topography ===
The topography of the Palos Verdes Peninsula AVA is often described as a low altitude mountain of the Coast Range situated between the Los Angeles Plain and the Pacific Ocean. It is covered by rolling hills, incised canyons, and coastal bluffs and terraces. Elevations range from sea level on the west and south to about 1,460 feet (450 m) above sea level at San Pedro Hill, which is located near the eastern/central area of the Palos Verdes Hills. The slope angles of the vineyards in the AVA range from gentle to high (0–50%). Some vineyards that are planted on steeper slopes have been terraced to allow for drainage/erosion control, equipment access, and solar orientation. The aspects of the vineyard slopes face south, southeast, and southwest, providing year-round solar exposure. The moderate slopes of the Palos Verdes Peninsula AVA promote:

- Air flow that helps to minimize mildew, botrytis rot, and frost issues;
- Drainage of excess water that helps to minimize root rot and;
- Direct sun exposure which aids in ripeness and reduces frost risk.

South-and southwest-facing slopes promote earlier bud break, bloom, and harvest than other aspects. Southeast-facing slopes bring morning radiation for soil warmth and canopy growth. In contrast, the surrounding areas have relatively flat topography with elevations ranging from sea level to about 500 feet (150 m). Slope angles range from 0–25%. Flatter topography can promote:

- Reduced air flow which can lead to mildew and botrytis rot;
- Pooling of water which can cause root rot and excessive vegetative growth; and
- Reduced photosynthesis from diluted sun exposure as it is spread out across a wider surface area.

=== Climate ===
The climate of Palos Verdes Peninsula AVA is "Mediterranean warm," which is characterized by warm, dry summers and mild winters with limited rainfall. The petition also described wind and fog patterns within the AVA and the surrounding regions. However, the petition did not provide enough data for TTB to determine if wind and fog are distinguishing features of the AVA, so those climate aspects are not discussed in this document. The vineyards within the AVA are located in the following microclimates: Climate Zone IA and IB (Coastal Zone), Zone III (Middle Highlands, Southeastern Upper Slope), and Zone IV (Middle and Lower North and East Slopes). These zones have milder temperatures, more fog, higher relative humidity, and lightly more rain than the surrounding areas which are classified as the warmer zones V and VI. As evidence of these milder temperatures, the petition includes weather data for the AVA and the surrounding areas from the National Oceanic and Atmospheric Administration (NOAA) from 2014 to 2017. The temperature data shows that average monthly temperatures for Palos Verdes Peninsula AVA range between four and six °F (−16 and −14 °C) lower than in the surrounding areas in the colder months, and five to eight °F (−15 to −13 °C) lower than in the surrounding areas in the summer months. While the average temperatures of the AVA and the surrounding areas are within a narrow range, the high and low temperatures of the surrounding areas are more extreme than the high and low temperatures of the AVA. Generally, the weather data shows that average spring and summer temperatures of San Pedro and Long Beach, which are farther inland than the AVA, are the warmest of the areas surrounding the AVA. The USDA plant hardiness zone ranges from 10b to 11a.

=== Geology and Soils ===
Palos Verdes Peninsula is an island-like terrain, or an isolated upland peninsula created by tectonic uplift and volcanic activity. During periods of intense geologic activity, the region of the AVA was subjected to repeated cycles of uplift, erosion, submersion, and deposition. Submersion allowed significant amounts of marine deposits to be laid down, which contributed to the soil composition. Uplift created new lands, while erosion wore away the newly-formed lands to create the series of marine terraces that characterize the region's topography today. By contrast, the geology of the surrounding areas is a large coastal plain, consisting mainly of surficial sediments, older surficial sediments, and shallow marine sediments. While the surrounding regions experienced the same ocean fluctuations as the AVA, they did not experience the same intensity of tectonic uplift and volcanic activity. The geology of the Peninsula consists primarily of the Monterey Formation and ancient landslides. The geology of the Monterey Formation created soils from the Altamont Series, including Altamont Clay Adobe and Altamont Clay Loam. A third soil commonly found in the AVA is the Diablo Clay Adobe. These three soils are rich in clays, adobe, and loamy clay and contain high amounts of calcium. The calcium found in Peninsula soils retains moisture in dry weather while allowing for good drainage. According to the petition, the levels of calcium in the soils produce thicker grape skins than are found on the same grape varietals grown in non-calcareous soils, which increases the amount of color, flavor, and aromatics in the resulting wine. The lowland areas surrounding the AVA have alluvial and fluvial-based sedimentary soils (sand and silt) which, according to the petition, generally produce wines with less color, acidity, and tannins, but with more aromas, than clay-and adobe-rich soils. These soils also have lower levels of calcium, and they can retain excessive water which can increase the chances of root disease.

== Viticulture ==
Dimitri and Leah Bizoumis are the proprietors of Villa Oneiro, an estate located on a rolling hillside in Rolling Hills near the geographical center of the Peninsula. Dimitri and Leah purchased the property in 1999 and soon had a thriving "kitchen" garden and olive orchard. The first Chardonnay and Pinot Noir grapes were planted in 2008 and 2009, respectively. Currently, they have 2,500 vines on the property which are surrounded by fragrant lavender, cherry and plum trees, and organic figs, apricots, citrus, nectarines and olives.
Jim and Kathy York own and operate Catalina View Wines, one of the largest agricultural operations on the Peninsula. The 94 acres (38 ha) York family property is located in the Portuguese Bend area, long known as the center of agriculture on the Peninsula. The York vineyard was planted in 2013 with rootstock grown in the Santa Rita Hills AVA of the Central Coast AVA. Pinot Noir (clone 828) and Chardonnay (clones 2a, 76 and 79) were grafted to rootstock S04, which is most appropriate for Peninsula soils. Wine is bottled under their Catalina View label. Catalina View Wines has State of California Department of Alcoholic Control, Alcoholic Beverage Licenses for "Off- Sale Beer and Wine" and "Beer and Wine Wholesaler". Mr. York has produced wine since 2009 under the Catalina View label. During this early period for Catalina View Wines, York worked with noted winemaker Ken Brown to produce an annual average of 150 cases of Chardonnay and 100 cases of Pinot Noir from their Santa Rita Hills grapes.
The other vineyards that share the Peninsula's good soils, excellent solar exposure, strong coastal influence, and a long growing season are Joan and Mac McClellan Vineyard, La Caze Family Vineyard, Mehlberg Vineyard, La Barba Vineyard, Clark Vineyard and Wagner Vineyard. They range in elevations between 200 and 1,000 ft (61–305 m). The blend of this unique geography, excellent physiography, favorable aspect, mild Mediterranean climate, and calcareous clay based soils produce excellent wines that are sold in local restaurants and event venues, as well as wines that are used entirely for personal consumption.
