= Sierra Pelona Valley AVA =

American Viticulture Area (AVA) in Los Angeles County, California

Coordinates: 34°31′02″N 118°20′36″W

Sierra Pelona Valley
- Wine region
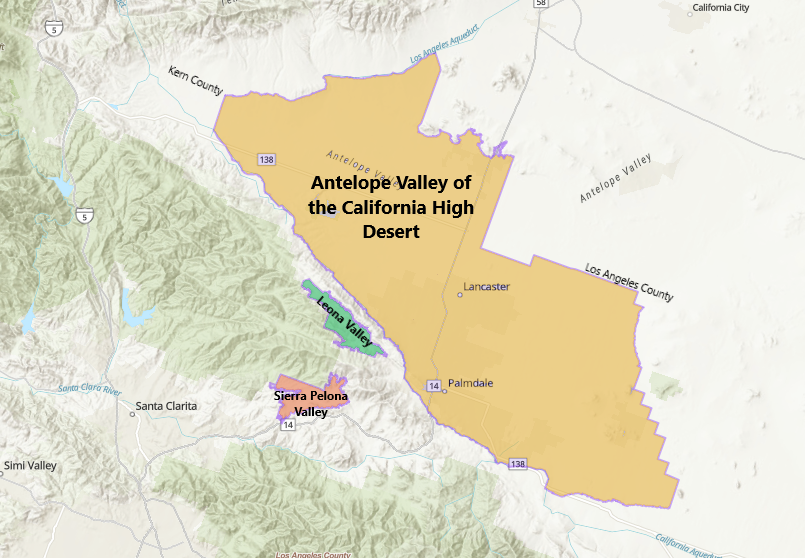
- Type: American Viticultural Area
- Year established: 2010
- Years of wine industry: 31
- Country: United States
- Part of: California, Los Angeles County
- Other regions in California, Los Angeles County: Antelope Valley of the California High Desert AVA, Leona Valley AVA, Malibu Coast AVA, Malibu-Newton Canyon AVA, Palos Verdes Peninsula AVA, Saddle Rock-Malibu AVA
- Growing season: 210 to 300 days
- Climate region: Region IV
- Heat units: 3,520–3,760 GDD
- Precipitation (annual average): 12.1 inches (310 mm)
- Total area: 6,200 acres (9.7 sq mi)
- Size of planted vineyards: 96 acres (39 ha)
- Grapes produced: Cabernet Sauvignon, Chardonnay, Malbec, Merlot, Muscat, Syrah, Tempranillo, Viognier, Zinfandel
- No. of wineries: 1

Sierra Pelona Valley is an American Viticultural Area (AVA) in the heart of the Sierra Pelona Mountains, located in northwestern Los Angeles County, California north of State Route 14 (SR 14) between the towns of Santa Clarita and Palmdale, 35 miles (56 km) east of the Pacific Ocean and 20 miles (32 km) southwest of the Mojave Desert. It was established on July 21, 2010, by the Alcohol and Tobacco Tax and Trade Bureau (TTB), Treasury after reviewing the petition submitted by Mr. Ralph Jens Carter on behalf of Antelope Valley Winegrowers Association (AVWA), Rancho Santiago Vineyards and Madsen Vineyards proposing the viticultural area named "Sierra Pelona Valley."
Encircling the community of Agua Dulce just 30 miles (48 km) north of the city of Los Angeles, the viticultural area is a valley expanding 6,208 acres (9.7 sq mi) with approximately 96 acres (39 ha) of cultivation. The local usage of the name "Sierra Pelona" applies to the expansive valley landform, as well as the mountain range to the north. The Sierra Pelona Valley name best describes the viticultural area, according to the petitioner. Viticulture in the Sierra Pelona Valley area started in 1995 and by 2008, the region had 96 acres (39 ha) of commercial vineyards.

== Terroir ==
=== Topography ===
The petition asserts that the distinguishing features of the Sierra Pelona Valley viticultural area include climate, geology, soils, topography, and elevation. The inland location of the Sierra Pelona Valley both influences its distinguishing features and contributes to the success of its viticulture.
The geology of the viticultural area includes mostly consolidated alluvium between 23 and 37 million years old, but also includes some more recent alluvium, between 1.5 and 2 million years old. Further uniformity in the area is provided by a granitic intrusion, ranging from 195 to 225 million years old, that spans the Sierra Pelona Valley. In contrast to the valley alluvium and the granitic intrusion, the surrounding mountains, ranging from 195 million to 4.5 billion years old, consist mainly of very different rocks. The petition states that elevations of the viticultural area vary from 2,400 to 3,400 feet (730–1,040 m). Those of the mountains to the west and of the mountain ridges to the north, east, and south vary from 3,401 to 5,187 feet (1,037–1,581 m). Elevations of a canyon in the Santa Clarita area, about 5 miles (8.0 km) southwest of the boundary line, drop to approximately 1,600 feet (490 m).
The large Sierra Pelona Valley region, oriented northeast-to-southwest, comprises Hauser Canyon, upper Agua Dulce Canyon, and Mint Canyon, including Sleepy Valley. The USGS Agua Dulce and Sleepy Valley maps show that the long, narrow, gentle side slopes of the Sierra Pelona Valley are surrounded by projecting mountain ridges to the north, east, and south and by a mountain and a chord of radiating canyons to the west. The valley floor itself has many isolated knolls but that most of the valley is on gentle slopes suited to viticulture. The USGS Agua Dulce and Sleepy Valley maps also show that intermittent tributaries in the Sierra Pelona Valley flow into Agua Dulce Canyon and create a single, south-flowing stream that eventually joins the Santa Clara River. The petition explains that the alluvium derived from rocks at higher elevations is carried downstream by these tributaries. This pattern of alluvium deposition contributes to the unique mix of mineral and chemical soil properties in the viticultural area. The fine quality winegrapes are universally associated with soils on midslopes where outwash accumulates and deeper soils form. These midslopes, the petition notes, are sometimes called viticulture "bellies," because they hold the sediment washed from the weathered rocks above and create vineyards. In most of the proposed viticultural area, winegrapes are grown on gentle midslopes. The petition states that the viticultural area has other features besides gentle slopes are favorable for viticulture. Good water and air drainage and soils with low fertility and a high mineral content produce grapevines with reduced vigor but with more natural balance.

=== Elevation ===
With peaks rising up to almost 5,800 feet (1,800 m), the Sierra Pelona Mountains form a substantial geological barrier between the ocean-cooled, low-lying Los Angeles Basin and the hot, dry elevations of the California High Desert. According to the USGS maps of the region and the petition, elevations in the viticultural area vary from 2,400 to 3,400 feet (730–1,040 m). Elevations also gradually decline approximately 1,000 feet (300 m) over the five miles (8.0 km) from the east side to the west side of the boundary line. At the town of Agua Dulce and the Agua Dulce Air Park in the Sierra Pelona Valley floor, elevations range from 2,500 to 2,600 feet (760–790 m). The petition states that elevations outside of the viticultural area are generally higher than those in the valley. Some close-in peaks in the Sierra Pelona Range are 5,187-foot (1,581 m) Mount McDill to the north, and west of Mount McDill, a 4,973-foot (1,516 m) promontory at Bear Springs and a 4,859-foot (1,481 m) peak at Willow Springs. According to the petition and the USGS Sleepy Valley map, southeast of Sierra Pelona Valley, Windy Mountain stands at 3,785 feet (1,154 m) and two unnamed peaks reach elevations of 3,791 and 3,706 feet (1,155 and 1,130 m), all within 1/4 to 1/2 mile (0.4 to 0.8 km) of the 3,200-foot (980 m) boundary line.

=== Climate ===
The petition, citing the "Soil Survey of the Antelope Valley Area", states that precipitation in the viticultural area averages between 9 and 12 inches (230 and 300 mm) per year and occurs mainly in winter. The Sierra Pelona Valley daily growing season temperatures can vary by 40 to 50 °F (4 to 10 °C), with summer daytime temperatures reaching 102 °F (39 °C), and summer nighttime temperatures frequently dropping to 50 to 60 °F (10 to 16 °C). To contrast the climate in the viticultural area with that in the surrounding areas, the petition gives climate data for several locations outside the area. Sandberg is at an elevation of 4,517 feet (1,377 m) in the high mountains northwest of the viticultural area, and although it has a total annual average precipitation of 12.1 inches (310 mm), about the same as the upper-end precipitation in the viticultural area, Sandberg has average daily growing season maximum and minimum temperatures of 77 and 54 °F (25 and 12 °C). San Fernando at an elevation of 977 feet (298 m) in a low-lying area to the southwest of the viticultural area, has a total average monthly precipitation of 16.9 inches (430 mm) and average daily growing season maximum and minimum temperatures of 85 and 52 °F (29 and 11 °C). Palmdale, at an elevation of 2,665 feet (812 m) in the desert due east of the viticultural area, has a total average monthly precipitation of 8.9 inches (230 mm) and average daily growing season maximum and minimum temperatures of 87 and 55 °F (31 and 13 °C). Air drainage from surrounding higher elevations to the Sierra Pelona Valley floor reduces the hazard of frost damage in spring. In addition, air movement across the slopes reduces the threat of leaf fungus and the need for heavy spraying of pesticides. Wind direction is frequently shifted and redirected by hills, knolls, and valleys. The petition states that the climate of the mountainous surrounding areas does not support viticulture due to an excessively short growing season, cooler summers, and vine-killing, cold winters.

=== Soils ===
According to the petition, climate, especially rainfall and heat, influences soils through the growth of plant types, the decomposition rate of organic matter, and the weathering of minerals. Rainfall in the viticultural area makes it a transitional zone between desert and forest. The soils on the valley floor in the viticultural area have significant differences compared to those on the surrounding mountains. On the valley floor and on foot slopes at the edges of the valley floor, the soils are very deep and moderately drained. The slope-wash soils on the foot slopes are poor, and have rock fragments on the surface in many areas. However, these rock fragments diffuse and reflect sunlight to lower leaves shaded by canopy, help keep the soil warm, and increase soil moisture, all of which benefits viticulture. And although the poor soils reduce the growth rate of the vines, the wines made from the grapes of those vines have more natural balance. The petition explains further that the soils of the area benefit the classic grape varieties, which generally produce well only in poor sandy soils. The reduced vine growth rate decreases the need for summer pruning, irrigation, and use of farm equipment. On the other hand, these soils have multidirectional sun exposures, which allow for the planting of a variety of grapes. In the viticultural area soil depth is 60 inches (1,500 mm) or more. The petition states that soil depth is important for vine growth because most vine roots grow to a depth of 39 inches (990 mm). Such deep roots are important because vines can extract 1 or 2 inches (25 or 51 mm) of moisture for each foot of rooting depth. In contrast, the soils on the surrounding mountains are shallow, excessively drained, and infertile. They are dominantly on steep slopes, and are subject to erosion. These soils are suited to recreation, range, and wildlife, and to use as a watershed. The soils in Land Resource Area #19 are placed in capability units on the assumption that these conditions exist:

1. The temperature generally is mild, and the frost-free period ranges from 210 to 300 days. Frosts occur locally, but protection is provided for crops that have a high cash value. Water erosion also is a hazard.
2. Irrigation water is available for most irrigable land from wells, local reservoirs or sources outside the land resource area. All reasonable means are taken to conserve water. Rainfall generally is adequate so that most crops are not affected by accumulation of salt.
3. Drainage and flooding generally are not a problem, though a few areas require further control of flooding. Flooding along the major streams has been reduced through flood-control works.
4. A wide variety of common field, truck, fruit and nut crops are grown.
5. A moderately high level of management is used.
