= Leona Valley AVA =

American Viticulture Area (AVA) in Los Angeles County, California

Coordinates: 34°36′53″N 118°17′19″W

Leona Valley
- Wine region
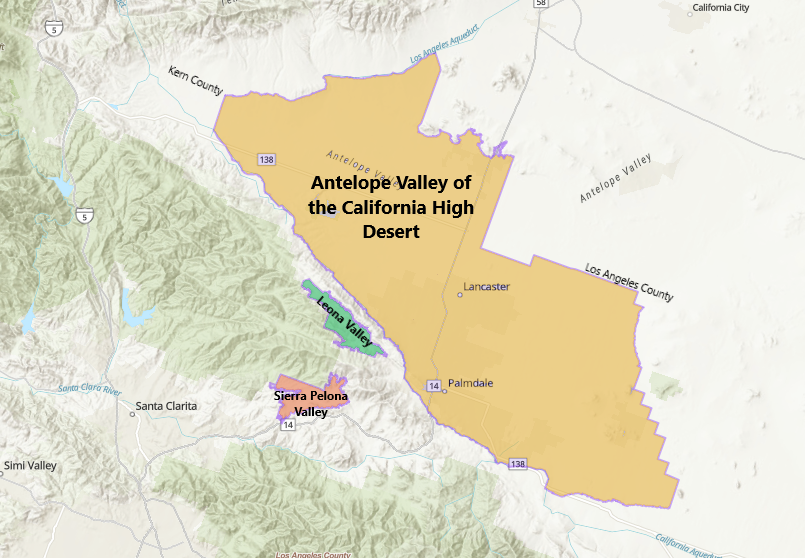
- Type: American Viticultural Area
- Year established: 2008
- Years of wine industry: 142
- Country: United States
- Part of: California, Los Angeles Connty
- Other regions in California, Los Angeles Connty: Antelope Valley of the California High Desert AVA, Malibu Coast AVA, Malibu-Newton Canyon AVA, Palos Verdes Peninsula, Saddle Rock-Malibu AVA, Sierra Pelona Valley AVA
- Growing season: 210 to 300 days
- Climate region: Region V
- Heat units: 4,060 GDD
- Precipitation (annual average): 9 to 12 in (230–300 mm)
- Soil conditions: Very deep soils with surface layer of loamy sand to loam
- Total area: 8,600 acres (13.4 sq mi)
- Size of planted vineyards: 20 acres (8.1 ha)
- Grapes produced: Pinot Noir, Chardonnay, Syrah, Cabernet Sauvignon

Leona Valley is an American Viticulture Area (AVA) in northeastern Los Angeles County, California located in the geographic, long, narrow Leona Valley surrounded by the Angeles National Forest, within the Sierra Pelona Mountains of Southern California. It is about 50 miles inland from the Pacific Ocean separated by the San Gabriel Mountains to the south and the Los Padres National Forest to the west. Portal Ridge on the northeast divides Leona Valley from Antelope Valley and the Mojave Desert.
Leona Valley viticultural area was established as the nation's 192^{nd}, the states's 117^{th} and the county's third appellation on October 29, 2008 by the Alcohol and Tobacco Tax and Trade Bureau (TTB), Treasury after reviewing the petition submitted by Mr. Ralph Jens Carter, on behalf of the Antelope Valley Winegrowers Association (AVWA), the Leona Valley Winery, and Donato Vineyards proposing the viticultural area named "Leona Valley." The 8,600-acre (13.4 sq mi) Leona Valley AVA encompasses the town of Leona Valley.

== History ==
This area was once home to the indigenous Kitanemuk tribe, a branch of the Serranos, who lived as hunter/gathers. They were first encountered by Franciscan friar Francisco Garcés in 1776, residing in communal tule houses. They were not a war-like tribe but often fought with the neighboring tribe, the Allikliks on the Santa Clara River. The first Spanish explorers to visit the valley, of whom we have any record, were Father Garcés and Pedro Fages who came to California with Gaspar de Portola who later became the first governor of Alta California. Spanish explorers and missionaries introduced livestock that included large numbers of sheep and cattle grazing on the foothills and in the valleys. After a severe drought in the 1880s, the number of livestock sharply decreased. Farmers from France, Germany and the state of Nebraska arrived, breaking these large ranches into smaller parcels, which they farmed. In the 1870s and 1880s permanent settlers began to arrive who bought land and some homesteaded. John E. Ritter Sr., came in the spring of 1894 and homesteaded 160 acres (65 ha). Here he grew his own grapes and built a winery. Later his sons acquired more land and branched out in hay, cattle and bees. In 1954, the Ritter Brothers holdings comprised 12,000 acres (4,900 ha). The name "Leona" derives from an early 1880s rancher named Miguel Leonis, a Basque sheep herder who called the area "Leona Valley." He married the daughter of Urbano, an Indian who owned the 1,100 acres (2 sq mi) Rancho El Escorpion near the present town of Calabasas. Soon Leonis owned the ranch and was grazing his sheep and cattle from Calabasas up through Leona Valley where he gained vast holdings. Currently, "Leona Valley" identifies the valley, a town within the valley, a ranch (the Leona Valley Ranch), and the annual Leona Valley Cherry Festival.

Early California wineries were established in and around the Leona Valley. Mr. Ritter was exacting about his wine production aging the wine for a minimum of five years, in a cave built into the side of a hill, before it was bottled, sold and shipped within the US and to Germany. The Ritter family's Belvino Vineyards was one of the first bonded and licensed wineries in the country. Prohibition ended wine production for the Ritters and two other families who also produced wine in Leona Valley, Fritz Eichehoffers and John Munzs. Federal regulators shut them all down breaking up the wine barrels so they could no longer be used. It was said the local creeks ran red. Many of the original vineyards' 100 year-old grapevines survived, are still thriving and producing the Mission and Zinfandel varieties once grown by the Ritter family in their Belvino Vineyards. Many old-timers in the wine industry from Napa and Sonoma still remember and speak of the Leona Valley for its outstanding wines from the pre-Prohibition days.

== Terroir ==
=== Topography ===
According to USGS maps of the region, the Leona Valley is a low, sloping landform with elevations between 2,932 and 3,800 ft (894–1,158 m). It is surrounded by higher hills, Portal Ridge, Ritter Ridge, Sierra Pelona, and the mountains of the Angeles National Forest, the highest of which has an elevation of 4,215 ft (1,285 m). According to the petition, the Leona Valley comprises isolated knolls of significantly different elevations and, in places, narrows to a width of a mile. The San Andreas Fault, a major continental fault system, is a significant distinguishing feature of the proposed Leona Valley viticultural area. As shown on the USGS maps of the region, this fault and its tributary faults in the Leona Valley trend southeast to northwest. The petition explains that the Leona Valley formed either when two parallel fault lines lifted mountains beside a drop-down area or when erosion over thousands of years caused a deep dissection in the fault zone. Seismic movement along the fault line has formed ridges and isolated hills and exposed various rocks. The petitioner states that ground water provides a plentiful supply of water for vineyard irrigation within the proposed Leona Valley viticultural area. As shown on the Ritter Ridge, Sleepy Valley, and Del Sur quadrangle USGS maps, many agricultural wells tap into the ground water. The petitioner states that the distinguishing features of the Leona Valley viticultural area consist of climate, physical features, geology, and soils. As evidence of many of the distinguishing features of the viticultural area, the petitioner cites the Soil Survey of the Antelope Valley Area, California (United States Department of Agriculture, Soil Conservation Service, in cooperation with the University of California Agricultural Experiment Station, 1970).

=== Geology ===
The petitioner explains that relative displacement and a lack of continuity of the rocks on either side of the San Andreas Fault contribute to the complexity, weakening, and erosion of the parent rock. Near some portions of the fault the varying sedimentary strata determine the geologic formation. Citing a California Department of Conservation Geologic Map, the petitioner notes that the mostly nonmarine and unconsolidated alluvium on the Leona Valley floor is from the Quaternary Period, or about 2 million years old or less. The various types of schist, quartz, granite, and a complex of mixed, Precambrian igneous and metamorphic rocks in the valley contrast with the surrounding hills, which formed on Paleozoic or Mesozoic strata, 65 to 280 million years ago.

=== Climate ===
The soil survey designates the southern and western parts of the Antelope Valley and the Leona Valley, as Major Land Resource Area (MLRA) 19, Southern California Coastal Plain. The petitioner explains that MLRA 19 has a distinctive combination of climate, soils, and mild temperatures, including an annual, 210 to 300-day frost-free period. Also, MLRA 19 is hot and dry in summer and cool and moist in winter. It is suitable to a wide variety of field, fruit, and nut crops. Annual precipitation ranges from 9 to 16 in (230–410 mm) in MLRA 19, and irrigation use is routine. According to the soil survey, the land management techniques and cropping systems used in MLRA 19 are different from those used in the adjacent MLRA 30, Mojave Basin and Range, and MLRA 20, Southern California Mountains. The petitioner also cites the Sunset Western Garden Book, which classifies the Leona Valley area as Zone No. 18. In this zone the continental air mass is a major influence on climate, and the Pacific Ocean determines the climate in the valley only about 15 percent of the time. Annual precipitation within the Leona Valley viticultural area ranges from 9 to 12 in (230–300 mm). In the Mojave Desert to the east of the Leona Valley, the range is only 4 to 6 in (100–150 mm). In the mountainous areas surrounding Leona Valley to the south, west, and north, the range is between 12 and 20 in (300–510 mm). The petitioner states that the growing season of the viticultural area has warm days and cool nights. The cool nights slow the ripening of the grapes, helping the grapes to retain their natural acidity. Air drainage off the slopes of the hills and mountains helps prevent spring frost damage to grapes. The petitioner submitted comparative data based on the Winkler Climate Classification System. In the Winkler climate classification system, heat accumulation per year defines climatic regions. As a measurement of heat accumulation during the growing season, 1 degree day accumulates for each degree Fahrenheit that a day's mean temperature is above 50 °F (10 °C), which is the minimum temperature required for grapevine growth. Climatic region I has less than 2,500 degree days per year; region II, 2,501 to 3,000; region III, 3,001 to 3,500; region IV, 3,501 to 4,000; and region V, 4,001 or more. The petitioner states that the air temperatures during the growing season in the viticultural area have an average heat summation of 4,060 degree days, which falls into the low range of region V. The USDA plant hardiness zone is 9a and 9b.

=== Soils ===
A fault increases the variety of rock exposed on the surface and eventually results in the formation of a greater variety of soil textures. Thus, the San Andreas Fault influenced the properties and mineralogy of the soils in the Leona Valley. The petitioner states that the soils on the Leona Valley floor differ from those beyond the boundary lines. The surface layer of the soils in the Leona Valley formed in mixed decayed organic matter and soil material that originated on the surrounding mountains. Multiple rock types on the valley floor were the parent material of alluvial soils that have diverse mineralogy and texture. The soils on the valley floor are deep and moderately drained; those on the surrounding hills are shallow and excessively well drained. According to the soil survey, the soils of the Leona Valley viticultural area are mainly the Hanford-Ramona-Greenfield association on alluvial fans and terraces. This association consists of nearly level to moderately steep, well drained, very deep soils that have a surface layer of loamy sand to loam. Hanford soils are well drained. They do not have a hardpan or a compacted clay layer, and are easily worked. According to the petitioner, Chino loam is in some areas of the Leona Valley AVA. This soil is suited to use as pasture and to seeding to perennial grasses. It is very deep and poorly drained, and has a seasonal high water table. Permeability in this soil is slow. In some places water is ponded on this soil. Growers install drainage systems or manage their crops to counteract the poor drainage of this soil. The petitioner explains that the Vista-Amagora association is among the dominant soils at higher elevations outside the boundary line of the Leona Valley viticultural area. This association consists of strongly sloping to steep, well drained to excessively drained soils that have a surface layer of coarse sandy loam. South of the valley, in smaller areas, is the Anaverde-Godde association. It consists of moderately steep or steep, well drained soils that have a surface layer of sandy loam or loam.

== Viticulture ==
Leona Valley is also home to several growers. Currently, the viticultural area contains 20 acres (8.1 ha) of commercial wine grape production on the Reynolds Family Vineyard and an acreage of Pinot Noir grapes on land owned by Donato Vineyards. At the time of filing the petition, Donato Vineyards, at the southeast end of the Leona Valley, planned to develop another 10 acres (4.0 ha) for growing wine grapes. The Leona Valley Winery is an active vineyard growing Burgundy, Bordeaux and Rhone varieties plus ice wine all within the AVA. Many grape varietals thrive thanks to the region's soil and balanced temperatures such as Sangiovese, Zinfandel, Cabernet Sauvignon, Cabernet Franc, Chardonnay, Petite Verdot, Pinot noir, Syrah, and Malbec covering the French, Rhône, and Burgundy regions of grape varieties.

== See also ==
- Antelope Valley of the California High Desert AVA
- Sierra Pelona Valley AVA
