= American Institute of Wine & Food =

The American Institute of Wine & Food is a non-profit organization dedicated to gastronomy and food culture. The Institute was founded in 1981 by a group of food industry professionals and enthusiasts, including Julia Child and Robert Mondavi. Today, the organization includes educational programs, a bimonthly publication titled Savor This, and local chapters across the United States.

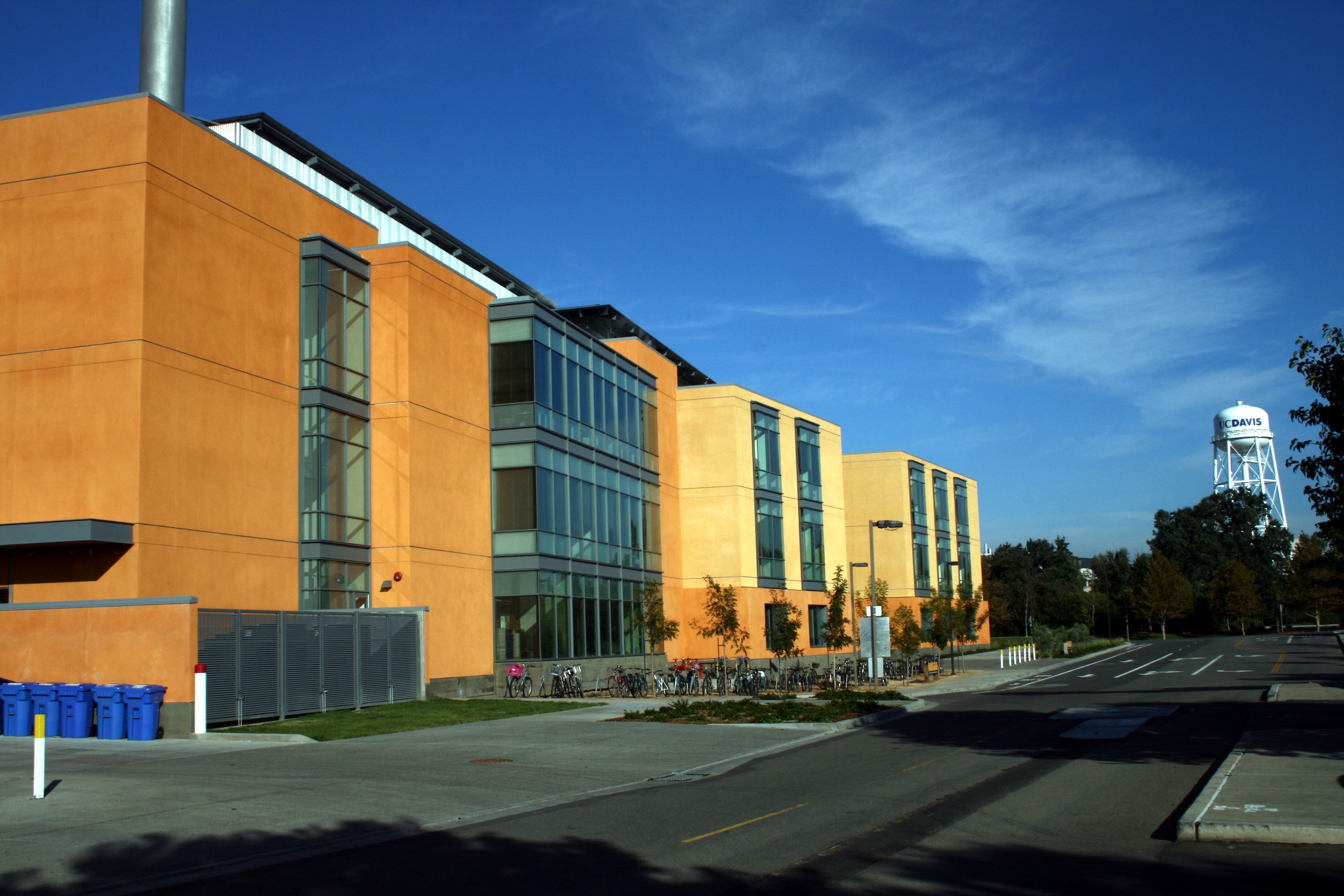
Robert Mondavi Institute of Wine and Food Science Building at UC Davis in Davis, California

== Mission ==
On their website, the group aims to further “the understanding, appreciation and quality of wine and food through fun educational experiences.” The AIWF implements these goals by awarding scholarships to culinary programs, organizing lessons about food and health for schoolchildren, and hosting community events.

== History ==
The initial concept for the AIWF was led in 1979 by John Ronsheim, as a university gastronomy program. Ronsheim recruited 57 culinary experts to advise in the program’s development including Julia Child, James Beard, Robert Mondavi, Jeremiah Tower, Alice Waters, and Barbara Kafka. In the following years, Ronsheim coordinated efforts to find a host university and investors for the program.

In 1981, the Institute was officially formed after funding a special collection of books on the culinary arts in an agreement with the University of California at Santa Barbara. Richard Graff was the first president.

The organization began to hold conferences and dinners which address topics such as sustainable eating and the benefits of local ingredients. The first of these was The Conference of Gastronomy held in New York City in 1985. The AIWF also began publishing an academic journal, The Journal of Gastronomy, to highlight emerging and relevant research. The journal was published from 1984 to 1991.

The Institute eventually began local chapters across the United States, and today there are 13 regional chapters. The AIWF also currently sponsors special collections at the University of California at San Diego and at the Radcliffe Institute for Advanced Study at Harvard University.
