= Richard Graff =

American winemaker

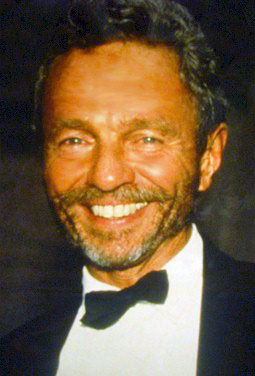
Richard Graff (1997).

Richard Hartshorne Graff (1937–1998) was a Californian winemaker.

== Early life ==
Born on January 20, 1937, Graff grew up in the San Francisco suburb of Danville. His first passion was music, culminating in a Bachelor of Arts from Harvard. While at Harvard he restored an entire theater organ in a local Boston movie theater. After attending Navy OCS, he served on the USS Cogswell - a destroyer in the Pacific, earning a commendation as a gunnery officer. He and his family purchased Chalone Vineyard in 1965. In the Judgment of Paris wine competition, it was ranked third out of ten.

== Winemaking ==
The vineyard grew into the Chalone Wine Group now owned by Foley Family Wine & Spirits. Graff was one of the first to bring barrel fermentation and aging to the California winemaking industry. He also initiated the practice of malolactic fermentation of white wines as well as the importation of French oak barrels into the United States. Graff said "I insist upon the traditional techniques for raising wine which entail minimal handling, so that what comes from the vineyard is carried intact through fermentation and aging, clarification and bottling, into the wine glass."

With his good friends Julia Child and Robert Mondavi, he founded the American Institute of Wine & Food (AIWF).

== Death ==
Richard Graff was killed when his Cessna 182 airplane crashed due to engine failure near Salinas on January 9, 1998. After his death, the Richard H. Graff Scholarship Fund was established which is funded by the sales of Graff Family Vineyards wines and provides scholarships to food and wine students.

== See also ==
- List of wine personalities
