= Malibu Coast AVA =

Appellation that designates wine in Los Angeles and Ventura Counties, California

Coordinates: 34°03′53″N 118°45′58″W

Malibu Coast
- Wine region
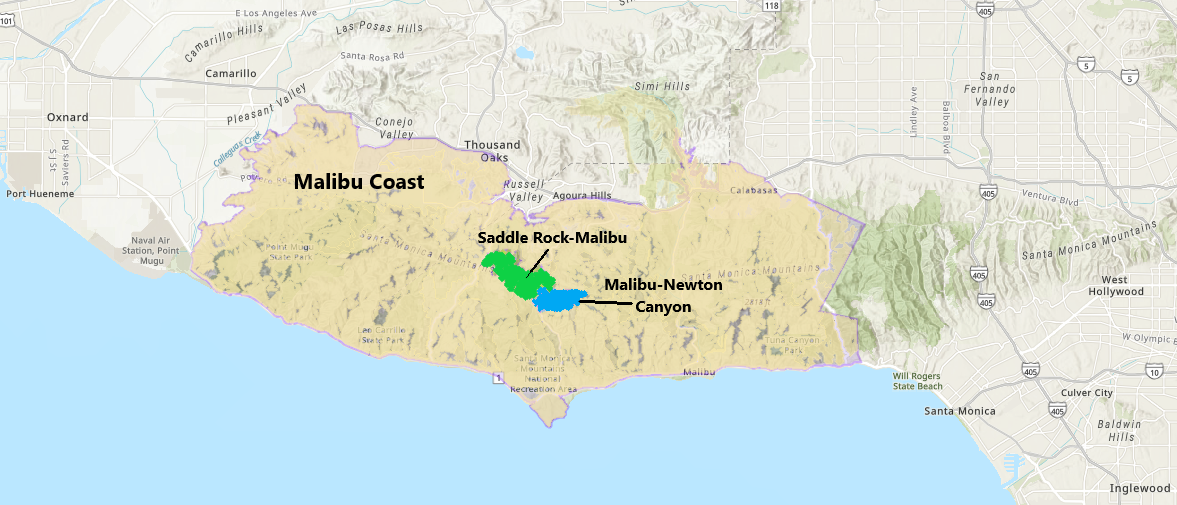
- Type: American Viticultural Area
- Year established: 2014
- Country: United States
- Part of: California, Los Angeles County, Ventura County
- Sub-regions: Malibu-Newton Canyon AVA, Saddle Rock-Malibu AVA
- Growing season: 296 days
- Climate region: Region II-IIIa
- Heat units: 2,500–3,000 GDD
- Precipitation (annual average): 24 in (610 mm)
- Total area: 44,590 acres (70 sq mi)
- Size of planted vineyards: 198 acres (80 ha)
- No. of vineyards: 52
- Grapes produced: Cabernet Sauvignon, Chardonnay, Merlot, Pinot Noir, Syrah
- No. of wineries: 1

Malibu Coast is an American Viticultural Area (AVA) located in Los Angeles and Ventura Counties. California. The area is a long, narrow, region along the Pacific coast within the Santa Monica Mountains. It was established on July 17, 2014, by the Alcohol and Tobacco Tax and Trade Bureau (TTB), Treasury after a three-year review of the petition, initiated by Elliott Dolin, owner of Dolin Malibu Estate Vineyards, submitted by Ralph Jens Carter, on behalf of the vintners and grape growers in the Malibu area, proposing the viticultural area named "Malibu Coast."
The Malibu Coast viticultural area encompasses the city of Malibu and is bordered by the city of Los Angeles to the east with the cities of Oxnard and Camarillo to the west. The Simi Valley and Simi Hills are located to the north, as well as the heavily urbanized regions and the communities of Thousand Oaks, Conejo Valley, Calabasas, and Greenwich Village. The Malibu Coast appellation encompasses approximately 44,590 acres (70 sq mi) of privately owned land within the rugged terrain of the Santa Monica Mountains National Recreation Area and contains as sub-appellations the previously established Saddle Rock–Malibu and Malibu–Newton Canyon viticultural areas. Its plant hardiness zones are 9b, 10 and 11a.

== History ==
The Santa Monica Mountains have a history of continuous human occupation dating back more than 8000 years. They were home to two of the largest Native American tribes in California – the Chumash and Garielino/Tongva. Large villages existed throughout the range, as evidenced by more than 1,000 archeological sites within the National Recreation boundaries. According to the petition, the name "Malibu" may have derived from a Chumash Indian word "(hu)-mal-iwu," which means, "it makes a loud noise all the time over there," referring to the sound of the surf. The word was later translated by the Spaniards into "Umalibo." The present-day spelling of "Malibu" first appeared in 1805, in documents to establish the Rancho Topanga Malibu Sequit land grant. Much of the viticultural area lies within the former land grant and thus its name.

The first European in the area was Juan Rodríguez Cabrillo, a Portuguese maritime explorer, in 1542. During the 1700s and early 1800s, Franciscan friars established missions to claim the territory for Spain. The King of Spain rewarded military veterans for faithful service by granting them "ranchos" for raising cattle. In 1804, Spanish Governor José Joaquín de Arrillaga gave permission to José Bartolomé Tapia to graze his livestock and develop the Rancho Topanga Malibu Sequit as much as he could. In 1821, Alta California became Mexican territory. Tapia's granddaughter, Maria and her husband Leon Prudhomme signed the title to this property in 1848, ironically on the same day that gold was discovered in California. After California became US territory, Prudhomme lost his title and Irish immigrant, Los Angeles businessman, Matthew Keller purchased 13,300 acres (21 sq mi) of the Rancho Malibu, in 1857 and 17 years later gained title to Topanga Malibu Sequit. In 1891, Frederick and May Rindge purchased a large parcel of this ranch and it was their resistance to urban development that resulted in a legacy of open space in the Santa Monica Mountains, which remains enforced today.
The first documented vineyard in the area was planted on Rancho Topanga Malibu Sequit by Jose Bartolome Tapia who left it to his wife, Maria, in 1824. Later, Matthew Keller planted hundreds of acres of grape vines in Solstice Canyon and named it the Rising Sun Vineyard. Prior to Prohibition, Los Angeles County was California's largest wine producer by volume until practically all wineries in the county were shuttered. The first modern day vineyard, The Malibu Vineyard, was planted in 1985 by restaurateurs Michael and Kim McCarty, with the help of Dick Graff of Monterey's iconic Chalone Vineyard.

== Terroir ==
=== Topography ===
The Malibu Coast viticultural area is characterized by the Santa Monica Mountains, which are oriented along an east–west axis between the cities of Los Angeles, to the east, and Oxnard and Camarillo, to the west. The mountain range begins as low marine terraces along the coastline and rapidly rises towards the north, increasing in steepness and elevation, with a maximum height of 3,111 feet (948 m) at Sandstone Peak, in the western portion of the viticultural area. Small steep-sided valleys and narrow, north–south oriented canyons that empty into the Pacific Ocean are also interspersed throughout the mountainsides. According to the petition, the steep slopes provide excellent water drainage for vineyards. Additionally, the north–south orientation of the canyons allows cool, moist air and fog from the Pacific Ocean to travel deep into the area and thus contributes to the moderate temperatures within the viticultural area. The slopes of the Santa Monica Mountains within the viticultural area tilt predominately toward the south, allowing the vineyards planted on the south-facing slopes to receive high amounts of solar radiation. The southerly orientation of the slopes also exposes the vineyards to sunlight that is reflected off the water of the Pacific Ocean, an effect known as a "second sun." The high level of solar radiation warms the soil in the vineyards quickly, which stimulates vine growth and fruit maturation. The warmed soil then slowly releases the stored heat back into the air in the early morning, at night, and during periods of cloud cover, providing a source of warmth to the vines during the times when the surrounding air temperature is cool.
Conejo Valley, Simi Valley, and the Simi Hills are located to the north of the viticultural area, and the elevations within these regions are generally lower than elevations within the Malibu Coast viticultural area. According to USGS maps provided with the petition, elevations within Conejo Valley and Simi Valley range between 640 and 700 feet (200–210 m). Elevations within the Simi Hills range between 1,800 and 2,400 feet (550–730 m). The Simi Hills have a north–south orientation, compared to the east–west orientation of the Santa Monica Mountains, and therefore do not receive as much solar radiation as the southward-facing slopes of the viticultural area. Although there are canyons within the region north of the viticultural area, the canyons do not stretch all the way to the ocean and thus do not serve as conduits for the cool, moist Pacific air and fog to reach the inland areas. The terrain in the region west of the viticultural area is lower and flatter than the terrain of the viticultural area. Elevations to the west of the viticultural area range from sea level along the shore of the Pacific Ocean to approximately 200 ft (61 m) near the city of Camarillo, as shown on USGS maps. The coastline of the region west of the viticultural area is dominated by the low, flat wetlands of Mugu Lagoon and lacks the marine terraces that characterize the coastline of the viticultural area. The vineyards within the viticultural area are scattered across the steep sides of the mountains, valleys, and canyons. The steep mountain slopes require extra effort to cultivate, thus contributing to the small size of many of the vineyards. Many of the vineyards are planted as firebreaks near private homes, to separate the properties from the surrounding native chaparral vegetation, which is particularly susceptible to fire due to its thick growth and high concentration of oils.

=== Climate ===
The climate of the Malibu Coast viticultural area is influenced by air masses over both the Pacific Ocean and the inland valleys to the north of the viticultural area. During the afternoon, the warm air of the inland valleys rises. As the warm air rises, it pulls cool, moist air from the ocean along the canyons and up the mountainsides of the viticultural area. These moist breezes raise the relative humidity levels within the viticultural area to about 50 percent during the summer. The moisture in the air reduces heat stress on the vineyards. At night, the breezes change direction as the relatively warmer air over the ocean rises and pulls the cooler, drier nighttime air from the inland valleys into the viticultural area. The dry nighttime breezes help remove excess moisture from the vines and fruit and reduce the growth of mildew. The Malibu Coast viticultural area has moderate growing season temperatures. Growing degree day 1 (GDD) accumulations gathered within the viticultural area between 2005 and 2009 show that the viticultural area receives between approximately 2,500 and 3,000 GDD units annually. This data categorizes the viticultural area as a Region II or low Region III climate on the Winkler scale. Rainfall within the viticultural area varies depending on elevation. Along the coastline and the lower marine terraces, rainfall averages 12 to 16 inches annually. At higher elevations within the viticultural area, rainfall may be as high as 30 inches annually. The region to the north of the viticultural area is primarily influenced by the inland air mass, with little marine influence. Although warm air rising from both Conejo Valley and Simi Valley draws moist air inland from the Pacific Ocean, most of the marine air is significantly drier by the time it travels over the Santa Monica Mountains and reaches the valleys. As a result, relative humidity levels within the inland valleys are lower than those of the viticultural area, with humidity levels averaging 20 percent or lower during the summer. Lower humidity levels also result in less rainfall in the inland valleys, with the weather station at Canoga Park averaging only 16.47 inches of rain a year. Because the Pacific air has also warmed by the time it reaches the inland valleys, temperatures are hotter in the region north of the viticultural area. The Canoga Park weather station recorded an average of 5,176 GDD units, placing the area in the very warm Region V category. The region to the west of the viticultural area shares a similar climate with the lower coastal elevations of the Malibu Coast viticultural area. However, because much of the land is either within the dense urban areas of Oxnard and Camarillo or reserved for military purposes, it is generally unsuitable for commercial viticulture.

=== Soils ===
The soils of the Malibu Coast viticultural area are derived from both volcanic parent rock and sedimentary parent rock, including combinations of sandstone, slate, and shale. According to the petition, this combination of both volcanic and sedimentary soils is unique among other California coastal regions, which generally lack volcanic soils. Seventy-five percent of the soils within the viticultural area are of four soil associations: Cotharin-Talepop-Rock Outcrop; Mipolomol-Topanga-Sapwi; Chumash-Malibu-Boades; and Zumaridge-Rock Outcrop-Kawenga. Soils of the Cotharin-Talepop-Rock Outcrop association derive from volcanic rocks. The Mipolomol-Topanga-Sapwi, Chumash-Malibu-Boades, and Zumaridge-Rock Outcrop-Kawenga associations all have soils that are derived from sedimentary sources. All four of the soil associations are described as shallow, well drained soils commonly found on steep slopes. Shallow soils prevent overly vigorous vine growth and produce a thinner leaf canopy that allows sunlight to reach the fruit. In humid regions such as the viticultural area, mildew and rot can form on fruit that is too shaded by the leaf canopy. Well drained soils are beneficial to viticulture because water does not accumulate long enough to lead to root rot or mildew. The petition states that continuous human habitation within the Santa Monica Mountains of the viticultural area has altered the nutrient content of the soils. Humans have inhabited the mountains for approximately 8,000 years, and large villages have been common throughout that time. The large number of bones and shells deposited in waste pits by the inhabitants throughout the ages has raised the level of calcium and phosphorus in the soils to higher levels than in the surrounding regions, according to the United States Department of Agriculture's 2006 edition of the Soil Survey of the Santa Monica Mountains National Recreation Area. Both calcium and phosphorus are important nutrients for vine growth and fruit development. The region located to the north of the viticultural area contains soils of the Rincon-Huerhuero-Azule association. These soils consist of alluvium and are found on level to moderately steep slopes. The soils are described as being very deep and moderately well drained. The regions to the west of the viticultural area contain soils of the Sulfic Fluvaquents-Camarillo-Pacheco and the Camarillo-Hueneme-Pacheco association. These soils consist of alluvium derived primarily from sedimentary rocks and are found on nearly level terrain such as flood plains and tidal flats. These soils are also very deep and poorly drained.

== Viticulture ==
The current era of commercial vineyards began with The Malibu Vineyard, which was planted in 1985. Malibu Coast AVA comprises 52 wine-grape growers; 49 of those vineyards have seven acres (2.8 ha) or less under vine. The final three growers, with 15, 32, and 65 acres (6, 13, and 26 ha), are located in the previously established Malibu-Newton Canyon and Saddle Rock-Malibu viticultural areas. This percentage of small acreage growers alone represents a uniqueness which is actually rather common in the Old World. Europe has several appellations where, historically, small commercial growers have dominated the scene, usually selling their produce through a cooperative. The Malibu Coast growers use the services of custom crush facilities and tasting rooms in a similar fashion. There are no wineries in the Malibu Coast area. Prohibition closed wineries in Los Angeles County until the turn of the 21st century. Recent revisions to the Zoning Ordinances allow wineries with vineyards in remote areas in order to support local agriculture, but there are continued restrictions prohibiting wineries within the boundaries of a National Recreation Area or one mile (1.6 km) beyond those boundaries The National Agricultural Statistics Service's "California Grape Acreage Report Crop 2015" documented the most widely planted varietals in Los Angeles County as Cabernet Sauvignon (69 acres), Syrah (32 acres), Zinfandel (21 acres), Merlot (20 acres), and Chardonnay (10 acres).
