= Antelope Valley of the California High Desert AVA =

American Viticultural Area in California

Coordinates: 34°32′15″N 117°56′35″W

Antelope Valley of the California High Desert
- Wine region
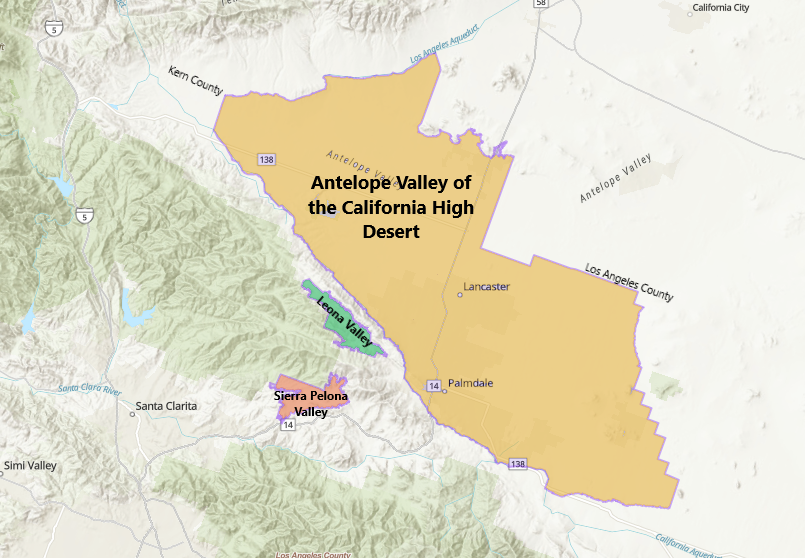
- Type: American Viticultural Area
- Year established: 2011
- Years of wine industry: 138
- Country: United States
- Part of: California, Kern County, Los Angeles County
- Growing season: 240–260 days
- Climate region: Region V
- Heat units: 4,600 GDD
- Precipitation (annual average): 4 to 9 inches (100–230 mm)
- Soil conditions: deep loamy fine sand to loam and silty clay
- Total area: 426,000 acres (665 sq mi)
- Size of planted vineyards: 125 acres (51 ha)
- No. of vineyards: 4
- Grapes produced: Cabernet Sauvignon, Grenache, Shiraz
- No. of wineries: 8
- Wine produced: 6500 cases, approximately 58,500 litres (15,500 US gal) annually

Antelope Valley of the California High Desert is an American Viticultural Area (AVA) within the wedge-shaped geologic landform, Antelope Valley, straddling the border of southern Kern County and northeastern Los Angeles County, California. It was established as the nation's 198^{th}, the states's 121^{st}, Los Angeles County's fifth and Kern County's initial appellation on May 24, 2011 by the Alcohol and Tobacco Tax and Trade Bureau (TTB), Treasury after reviewing the petition submitted by Mr. Ralph Jens Carter, on behalf of the Antelope Valley Winegrowers Association (AVWA) proposing a viticultural area named "Antelope Valley of the California High Desert."
The vast 426,000-acre (665 sq mi) viticultural area encircles the cities of Lancaster and Palmdale. Just outside its western boundary lie the previously established, diminutive Leona Valley and Sierra Pelona Valley viticultural areas. In 2007, Antelope Valley had 128 acres (52 ha) of cultivation on 16 commercial vineyards and 2 bonded wineries according to the petition, yet, there are currently four vineyards and eight wineries in the AVA according to AVWA.

== Name Evidence ==
The name "Antelope Valley of the California High Desert" combines the name recognition of the valley and the California high desert area into a single geographic descriptor, according to the petitioner. The modifier "California High Desert" distinguishes the viticultural area from other places in California and elsewhere also called "Antelope Valley." "California High Desert" is commonly used by area inhabitants to distinguish and identify the Antelope Valley located in the high desert in southeastern California. According to the Geographic Names Information System (GNIS) maintained by the USGS, the "Antelope Valley" name identifies 35 geographical locations in 10 States, including 9 locations in California. The petition contains several documents and citations that refer to the "Antelope Valley" in Los Angeles and Kern Counties, as follows: The USGS 1974 photorevised Little Buttes Quadrangle map; the 1977 Geologic Map of California, compiled by Charles W. Jennings; the 2005 DeLorme Southern and Central California Atlas and Gazetteer; the California Air Resources Board Web site; and the 2001 edition California State Automobile Association (CSAA) Coast and Valley map. The petition also includes excerpts of the 2006 Antelope Valley AT&T telephone directory listing more than 80 entities—businesses, churches, health care providers, a college, a high school district, and a chamber of commerce with "Antelope Valley" in their names. References to the "High Desert" in the viticultural area name include an excerpt from the 2006 Antelope Valley AT&T telephone directory. The telephone directory lists 25 entities in the subject Antelope Valley area businesses; health care providers, a school, a church, and a hospital with "High Desert" in their names. Also of relevance, Antelope Valley is described as "Medium to high desert of California and southern Nevada."

== History ==
For an estimated 11,000 years, various cultures have populated the Antelope Valley region, according to the petition. Native American tribes, traveling north from what is now Arizona and New Mexico, used the valley as a trade route. In the 1880s and early 1890s, Antelope Valley had ample rainfall and available surface water for farming. When settlers needed irrigation for farming, they initially used water from mountain streams, but eventually they dug wells into underground water reservoirs. The petition states that early viticulture in the Antelope Valley area consisted of two growers in Lancaster. By 1893, viticulture in the area grew to 239 acres (97 ha) of vines, 6.5 acres (2.6 ha) of wine grapes, and 8 growers. A drought in 1894 and Prohibition (1919–1933) ended viticulture in Antelope Valley. However, in the early 20th century, water supplies for general farming in the valley became dependable as gasoline engines and electric pumps became advent. In 1913, the Los Angeles Aqueduct was built, extending from Owens Valley in southeastern California to Los Angeles. Bordering the north side of Antelope Valley, the Los Angeles Aqueduct revived the agricultural economy in the valley. Viticulture restarted in 1981, when Steve Godde planted five acres (2 ha) of grapevines on the west side of the valley.

== Terroir ==
=== Topography ===
The terrain of the Antelope Valley of the California High Desert viticultural area is characterized by significant uniformity and continuity, according to the petition. Slopes are level or nearly level on the valley floor, but range to gently sloping to moderately sloping on rises at the upper elevations of the terraces and alluvial fans. And, although the viticultural area is approximately 52 mi (84 km) wide, elevation varies only 838 ft (255 m), as shown on the USGS maps. The elevation of the surrounding mountains varies from that of the valley by approximately 450 to 4,900 ft (140–1,490 m), as shown on the USGS maps.

=== Climate ===
In most years, summers in the Antelope Valley are hot and dry, and winters are relatively cold, Annual precipitation in the valley ranges from 4 to 9 in (100–230 mm), with little or no snow. The growing season is 240 to 260 days long. Hot summers, cold winters, and widely varying daily temperatures characterize the climate in the Antelope Valley. On average, 110 days a year have high temperatures above 90 °F (32 °C), but nights are mild. The growing season extends from mid-March to early November. Winter low temperatures range from 6 to 11 °F (−14 to −12 °C). In the mountainous areas to the south, west, and north of the Antelope Valley, summers are cool and winters are cold. To the west, in addition to the mountainous region, are areas of lower elevation terrain with a longer and warmer growing season conducive to successful viticulture. Annual precipitation is 9 to 20 in (230–510 mm), significantly more than the 4 to 9 in (100–230 mm) of precipitation in the valley; consequently, it increases the groundwater supply in the valley. The growing season in the mountains ranges from 50 to 240 days, as compared to the growing season in the viticultural area which ranges from 240 to 260 days.
Northeast of the viticultural area lies Edwards AFB, for which climate data related to agriculture or viticulture is limited, according to the petition. To the southeast, in an Antelope Valley-Mojave Desert transition zone, summers are hot; winters are mild with neither severe cold nor high humidity. The growing season of this transition zone is 170 to 190 days—shorter than that in the Antelope Valley. There are 24 climate zones within the continental western United States. Climate zones are based on factors such as winter minimum temperatures, summer high temperatures, length of the growing season, humidity, and rainfall patterns. These factors are determined by latitude, elevation, ocean proximity and influence, continental air, hills and mountains, and local terrain. Climate in Sunset climate zone 1 is the harshest cold weather, and climate in Sunset climate zone 24 is the mildest. The Antelope Valley lies in Sunset climate zone 11, "Medium to high desert of California and southern Nevada." Different Sunset climate zones exist in areas 11 mi (18 km) or less to the north, west, and south of the Antelope Valley. The Tehachapi Mountains, to the north, and Sandberg to the west, are in Sunset climate zone 1A, "Coldest mountains and intermountain areas throughout the contiguous states and southern British Columbia." Winter low temperatures are 0 to 11 °F (−18 to −12 °C). The growing season in climate zone 1A generally lasts from end of May to the first part of September, and summers are mild. To the south, in the higher elevations of the San Gabriel Mountains, lies Sunset climate zone 2A, "Cold Mountain and Inter-Mountain Areas." Winter low temperatures are 10 to 20 °F (−12 to −7 °C). The lower-elevation areas of the San Gabriel Mountains south of the Antelope Valley lie in Sunset climate zone 18, "Above and below the thermal belts in Southern California's interior valleys." The growing season in climate zone 18 can extend from the end of March to late November. Winter low temperatures average between 7 and 22 °F (−14 and −6 °C). The lower-elevation areas of the San Gabriel Mountains are intermediate zones where the Antelope Valley transitions to the part of the San Gabriel Mountains in Sunset climate zone 2A. Southeast of the Antelope Valley, where the San Gabriel Mountains transition to higher elevations, lies Sunset climate zone 7, "California's Gray Pine Belt." The growing season in climate zone 7, from late April to early October, extends from 170 to 190 days. Summers are hot, and winters are mild. Winter low temperatures average between 26 and 35 °F (−3 and 2 °C). The area to the east of the Antelope Valley, near Victorville and Edwards AFB, lies in Sunset climate zone 10, "High desert areas of Arizona and New Mexico." This zone includes the part of the Mojave Desert near the California-Nevada border. Climate zone 10's growing season, early April to November, averages 225 days. Winter low temperatures average between 22 and 25 °F (−6 and −4 °C). The Winkler climate classification system uses heat accumulation during the growing season to define climatic regions for viticulture. As a measurement of heat accumulation during the growing season, 1 degree day accumulates for each degree Fahrenheit that a day's mean temperature is above 50 degrees, the minimum temperature required for grapevine growth. Climatic region I has less than 2,500 growing degree days per year; region II, 2,501 to 3,000; region III, 3,001 to 3,500; region IV, 3,501 to 4,000; and region V, 4,001 or more. Antelope Valley of the California High Desert viticultural area has an annual average heat accumulation of 4,600 growing degree days (GDD) and therefore is in Winkler climate region V, according to the petition. The areas to the east, also in Winkler region V, have a greater annual heat accumulation (4,900 degree days) but a shorter growing season (215 to 235 days) compared to the viticultural area. Sandberg, to the west of the Antelope Valley, is in Winkler region III. Most mountainous areas surrounding the Antelope Valley are not assigned to a Winkler climate region because they are too cold to support commercial viticulture. The USDA plant hardiness zone range is 8a to 9a.

=== Soils ===
Antelope Valley viticultural area lies on the western rim of an old alluvial basin with interior drainage by intermittent and ephemeral streams. The boundary line closely follows the highest elevations of the alluvial fans and terraces of the basin. The soils in the Antelope Valley formed in alluvium weathered from granite and other rocks in the surrounding mountains. The soils are: very deep loamy fine sand to loam and silty clay; well drained and well aerated in the root zone; and mineral rich with low to moderate fertility. The available water capacity ranges from 5 to 12 in (130–300 mm). The predominant soils in the viticultural area are the Hesperia-Rosamond-Cajon, Adelanto, Arizo, and Hanford-Ramona-Greenfield associations. These soils formed in alluvium derived from granitic rock on alluvial fans and terraces. Generally, they vary in drainage, slope, elevation, and natural vegetation. The Hesperia-Rosamond-Cajon association consists of moderately well drained to excessively drained soils on 0 to 15 percent slopes. Elevations range from 2,400 to 2,900 ft (730–880 m). Natural vegetation includes annual grasses, forbs (wild flowers), Joshua tree, Mormon tea, rabbit brush, and large sagebrush. The Adelanto association consists of well drained soils on 0 to 5 percent slopes. Elevations range from 2,450 to 2,800 ft (750–850 m). Natural vegetation consists of annual grasses and forbs and in some areas desert stipa, sagebrush, creosote bush, Joshua tree, and juniper. The Arizo association consists of excessively well drained soils on 0 to 5 percent slopes. Elevations range from 2,950 to 3,100 ft (900–940 m). Natural vegetation includes annual grasses, forbs, creosote bush, Mormon tea, and rabbit brush. The Hanford-Ramona-Greenfield association consists of well drained soils on 0 to 30 percent slopes. Elevations range from 2,600 to 3,900 ft (790–1,190 m). Natural vegetation includes annual grasses and forbs and, in scattered areas, juniper. Unlike the soils in the Antelope Valley, the soils on the surrounding uplands are generally shallow, excessively well drained, coarse sandy loam, and available water capacity is 1.5 to 7 in (38–178 mm). Included with the soils in the Antelope Valley are saline soils in small, scattered areas within the viticultural area. Outside the viticultural area, near Rosamond and Rogers Lakes, saline soils appear as larger areas. TTB notes that saline soils are not suitable for agriculture, including viticulture.
