= Chalone Vineyard =

American vineyard located in California

Coordinates: 36°28′13″N 121°13′48″W

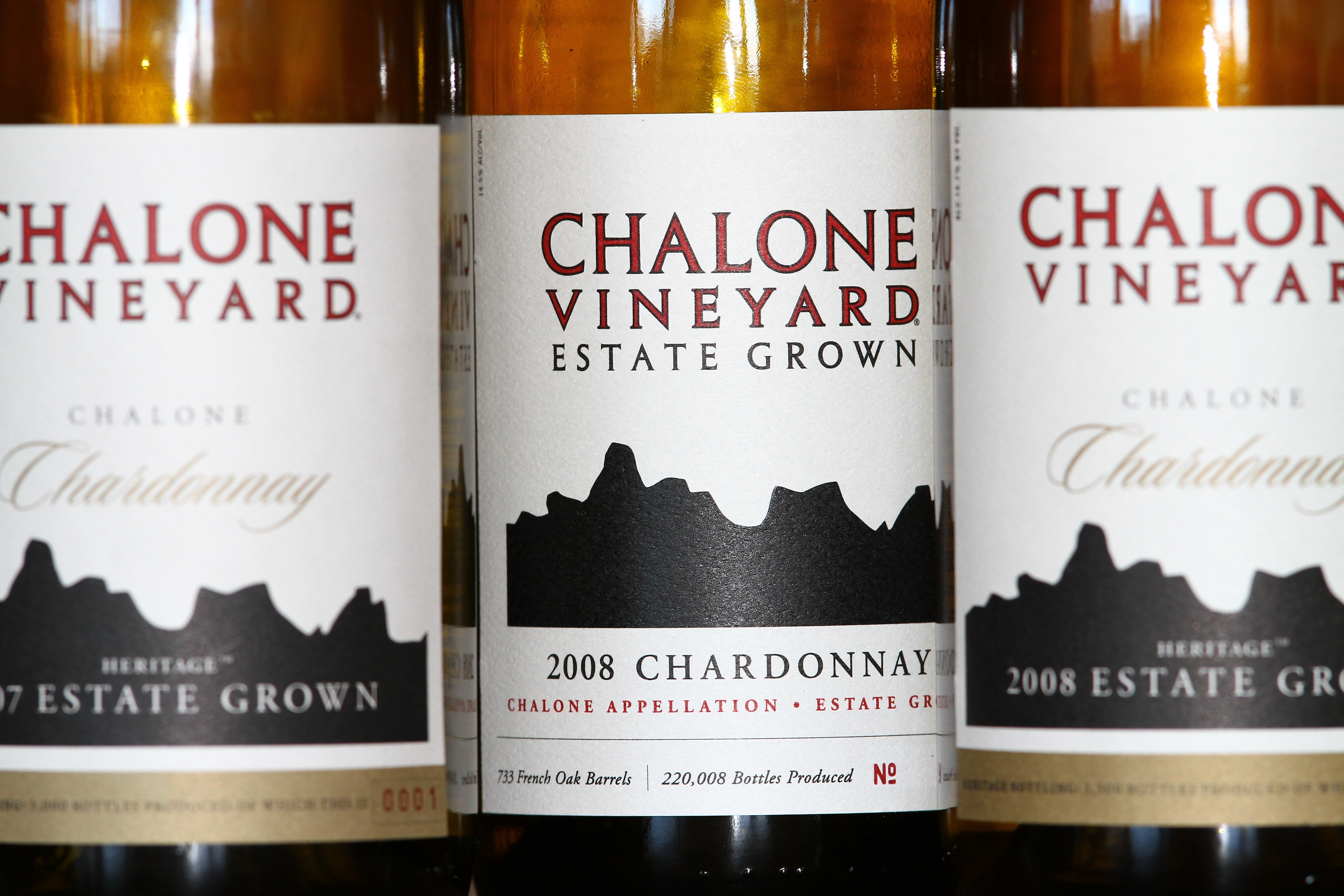
Chalone Estate Chardonnay

Chalone Vineyard is located in the Chalone AVA south of San Francisco, California, United States, on an unusual geological formation called the Gavilan benchland. The soil is rich in limestone and calcium carbonate and also contains a significant amount of decomposed granite. This soil has a mineral composition similar to the Champagne region of France. Chalone is situated in an arid chaparral environment, in which temperatures can vary as much as 50°F in one day. The climate is very dry, only 12 to 14 inches (360 mm) of rain fall per year. These factors combine to create a unique terroir, the signature profile of a wine growing region.

== History ==
In 1919, French immigrant and entrepreneur, Charles L. Tamm, traveled through California searching for the terroir with limestone soil similar to his native Burgundy. He found a property in southern Monterey County on the north slope of Chalone Peak which is currently Chalone Vineyards. On the limestone-based elevated 1,800 feet (550 m) topography, Tamm planted Chenin Blanc sourcing for wineries even during Prohibition, when the grapes were used to make sacramental wines. Winegrowing, however, never became important in Monterey County because it was considered a “poor area” for viticulture. Strong winds off Monterey Bay and the arid, climate of the Salinas River Valley deterred the planting of wine grapes. During Prohibition, only 400 acres (162 ha) of vineyards in Monterey County survived and this acreage was halved in the years following Repeal. Later, Chalone Vineyard grew and its grapes were sold in the 1940s and '50s to Almaden Vineyards and Wente Brothers.

In 1964, the property was purchased by new owners with a commitment to producing fine wine. Under the guidance of California wine pioneer Richard H. Graff, the vineyard expanded when new vineyards were planted and the winery was moved from a converted chicken shed to a bigger location adjacent to where a newer (and much larger) winery stands today. Graff wanted to establish a Burgundian-Style, top-flight Chardonnay, and with his brothers, John Graff and Peter Watson-Graff, began producing some of the earliest barrel-fermented and aged wines in the United States. In addition to introducing California to oak barrels, Graff brought to California the process of malolactic fermentation in white wines. In 1971 he was joined by Phillip Woodward and the two began what would later become the Chalone Wine Group. The finishing of Chardonnays with oak barrel fermentation/ aging and the addition of the malolactic process makes the Chards similar to the Bourgogne rule book.

At the legendary Judgement of Paris on 24 May 1976, Chalone Vineyard's 1974 Chardonnay ranked 3rd in the white wine category scored by renowned oenophiles. The 11 judges, 9 French, a British and an American, ranked California vintages 1st, in both red and white categories. Chalone's identical vintage ranked 1st in a repeat event at the San Francisco Wine Tasting of 1978.

Chalone grew and prospered first with Richard Graff and brothers John and Peter Watson-Graff, then Michael Michaud as winemaker. During this time the Chalone Wine Group expanded to include six wineries in California and two in Washington. Chalone Wine Group also owned about 24% of the Chateau Duhart-Milon estate in France. In 2005, Chalone Wine Group was purchased by beverage giant Diageo. In early 2016 it was sold to Foley Family Wines.

Today, Chalone Vineyard produces Chardonnay, Pinot noir, Pinot blanc, Chenin blanc, Syrah, Grenache and Grenache Rose.

== See also ==
- Chalone AVA
- California wine
