= Saddle Rock-Malibu AVA =

Appellation that designates wine in Los Angeles County, California

Coordinates: 34°05′48″N 118°49′56″W

Saddle Rock-Malibu
- Wine region
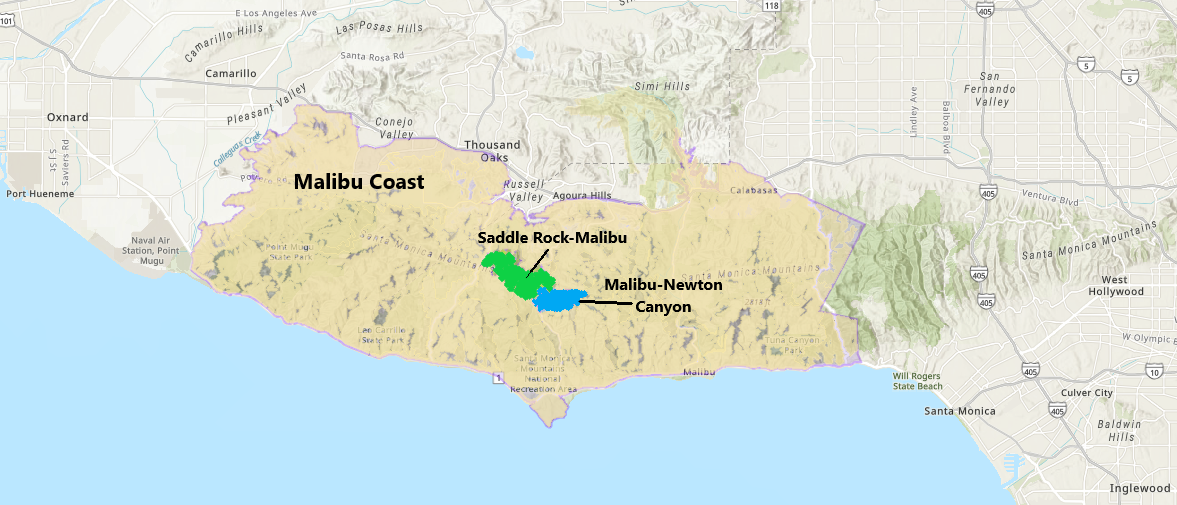
- Type: American Viticultural Area
- Year established: 2006
- Years of wine industry: 29
- Country: United States
- Part of: California, Los Angeles County, Malibu Coast AVA
- Other regions in California, Los Angeles County, Malibu Coast AVA: Malibu-Newton Canyon AVA
- Growing season: 296 days
- Climate region: Region V
- Heat units: 4,200 GDD
- Precipitation (annual average): 11.31 inches (287 mm)
- Soil conditions: Rocky clay loam and clay loams
- Total area: 2,090 acres (3 sq mi)
- Size of planted vineyards: 85 acres (34 ha)
- No. of vineyards: 1
- Grapes produced: Cabernet Franc, Cabernet Sauvignon, Chardonnay, Grenache, Merlot, Mourvedre, Petit Verdot, Orange Muscat, Sauvignon Blanc, Syrah / Shiraz, Viognier
- No. of wineries: 1

Saddle Rock-Malibu is an American Viticultural Area (AVA) located in western Los Angeles County, California that covers about 2,090 acres (3 sq mi) in the Santa Monica Mountains, approximately 32 miles (51 km) west of downtown Los Angeles and five miles (8 km) inland from the Pacific Ocean. It was established as the nation's 181st, the state's 104th and the county's second appellation on July 17, 2006, by the Alcohol and Tobacco Tax and Trade Bureau (TTB), Treasury after reviewing the petition submitted by Lisa A. Semler and Derek Baugh, of Semler Malibu Estate Vineyards in Malibu, California, proposing a viticultural area named "Saddle Rock-Malibu."
The viticultural area lies between 1,700 and 2,236 feet (518 and 682 m) in elevation and has 85 acres (34 ha) of vineyards located between 1,800 and 2,000 feet (550 and 610 m) in elevation. In the hills of Malibu near the center of the viticultural area, Saddle Rock is a prominent saddle-shaped rock formation that rises 2,000 ft (610 m) above sea level and seen from miles away as monuments to the natural wonders of mountain forming. Saddlerock Ranch is located within the area, and the Saddle Rock Pictograph Site, located on the ranch between Saddle Rock and Mitten Rock, is a National Historic Landmark. Saddlerock Ranch and Saddlerock Vineyard, named after the striking stone landmark that looks like a saddle, can be found. In 2014, Saddle Rock-Malibu and its adjacent neighbor Malibu-Newton Canyon became sub-appellations within the newly established 44,590 acres (69.67 sq mi) Malibu Coast viticultural area.

== History ==
The origin of the name "Malibu" may have derived from a Chumash Indian word "(hu)mal-iwu," which means, "it makes a loud noise all the time over there," referring to the sound of the surf. The word was later translated by the Spaniards into "Umalibo." The present-day spelling of "Malibu" first appeared in 1805, in documents to establish the Rancho Topanga Malibu Sequit land grant. Much of the viticultural area lies within the former land grant and thus its name. The Saddle Rock site is considered of national significance and designated a National Historic Landmark due to the extensive and well preserved pictographs left by the Chumash peoples as landmarks of prehistoric and early historic travelers.
This entire non urban area of rugged landscapes is known as Saddle Rock. Its rich, fascinating history began more than three centuries ago when the vast expanse surrounding the Santa Monica Mountains was settled during the era of Spanish colonial land grants. The area lies between the historic Rancho Topanga Malibu Sequit land grant to the south and the Rancho El Conejo land grant to the north. The area of more than 200,000 acres (310 sq mi) was a perfect site for sheep and cattle herding, and up until the 1930s Saddle Rock Ranch was known as "El Malibu." The ranch surrounding the Saddle Rock formation, by the 1930s, was known as Saddle Rock Ranch that was often visited by the California governor and future president, Ronald Reagan, in the 1960s. With the construction of the Pacific Coast Highway in 1930, the Malibu region developed into the nationally known community it is today. Wine grape production within the Saddle Rock-Malibu viticultural area began in 1997, according to the petition, and as of February 2005 the area had 70 acres (28 ha) of cultivation in commercial production all located on the Saddle Rock Ranch.

== Terroir ==
=== Topography ===
The Saddle Rock-Malibu viticultural area's high elevations, north-facing slope orientation, and geographical location in the Santa Monica Mountains all combine to create a microclimate with limited marine influence, according to the petition. As compared to surrounding areas with more marine influence, the area receives more growing season sunshine and has warmer temperatures. The area's microclimate, the petition continues, creates a distinctive and unique mountainous grape-growing region.
The Saddle Rock-Malibu viticultural area, according to the petition, is a geographically suspended valley located largely on the leeward side of the Santa Monica Mountains. From the mountains' crest, elevations drop about 2,000 feet (610 m) to the Pacific Ocean in the south and, in the north, about 1,000 feet (300 m) to the Conejo Valley floor. Within the viticultural area, elevations range from allow of 1,700 feet (520 m) along much of the boundary line to a 2,236-foot (682 m) peak along its northeast border, as shown on the Point Dume map. Intermittent streams flow from the higher elevations downward towards the Pacific Ocean or towards larger streams in the Conejo Valley to the north. Several secondary highways, light-duty roads, and a number of unimproved roads and jeep trails criss-cross the Saddle Rock area, as shown on the Point Dume USGS map.

=== Climate ===
The unique microclimate of the Saddle Rock-Malibu viticultural area is its most distinguishing feature, according to the petition, which included a climate report prepared by Fox Weather of Fortuna, California. While the larger Malibu regional climate is typical of southern California with mild, rainy winters and warm, dry summers, the petition states that the Saddle Rock-Malibu viticultural area is climatically affected by its geographical location in the Santa Monica Mountains. The Pacific Ocean, about 5 miles (8.0 km) south of the viticultural area, provides an intrusive marine influence that permeates the Santa Monica Mountains area incrementally, based on elevation, time of year, and other factors, according to Fox Weather. In this region of Los Angeles County, this cool, moist, marine influence funnels northward from the ocean, through the low gaps in the mountain range, reaching various elevations at different times in the growing season. The Saddle Rock-Malibu viticultural area's high elevations, its location on the leeward side of the mountains' crest, and its north-facing mountain slopes are significant factors in limiting the extent of the cooling marine influence received within the area. Summers in the Malibu region are hot and dry at the higher elevations above the marine influence and are cooler and less sunny in the lower coastal areas and beaches, according to Fox Weather. A comparison of growing season heat accumulation as measured by degree-days shows that the proposed Saddle Rock-Malibu viticultural area, at 4,200 degree-days, is somewhat warmer than the nearby Malibu-Newton Canyon viticultural area, which accumulates 4,000 to 4,100 degree days during the growing season. Degree-days represent a measurement of heat accumulation during the growing season, with one degree-day accumulating for each degree that a day's mean temperature is above 50 °F (10 °C), which is the minimum temperature required for grapevine growth. Further inland, toward the San Fernando Valley, temperatures are warmer during the day and cooler at night than along the crest of the Santa Monica Mountains. The temperature and growing condition differences between the Saddle Rock-Malibu viticultural area and the established Malibu-Newton Canyon viticultural area result from the prevailing wind flows of summer (south through west-northwest directions). Located on the leeward side of the Santa Monica Mountains' crest, the Saddle Rock-Malibu area receives more sunshine and has higher daytime temperatures than the Malibu-Newton Canyon area, which is located just southeast of the Saddle Rock-Malibu area on the windward side of the mountain crest and is, therefore, more strongly influenced by the cooling Pacific marine air. Also, the warm, down slope wind that affects the Saddle Rock-Malibu area is less evident in the Malibu-Newton Canyon area. The USDA plant hardiness zones are 10a and 10b.

=== Soils ===
Predominant soils of the Saddle Rock-Malibu viticultural area include Cropley clay, Gilroy clay loam and rocky clay loam, and Hambright loam, clay loam and rocky clay loam, according to Robert Roche of Roche Vineyard Consulting in his June 5, 2004, letter to the petitioners. The U.S. Department of Agriculture's Soil Conservation Service (now the Natural Resources Conservation Service) publication, "Soils of the Malibu Area California", states that Cropley clay is well drained with slow permeability. Cropley clay occupies nearly level to moderately sloping alluvial fans, and bedrock is found more than 5 feet (1.5 m) below the surface. According to the 1967 "Soils of the Malibu Area California" publication, Gilroy clays are well drained with slow permeability. They occupy gently rolling to steep upland areas, and bedrock is generally found between 2 and 3 1/3 feet (0.61 and 1.02 m) below the surface. Hambright clay loams, are well drained with moderate permeability. They occupy moderately steep to very steep upland areas, and bedrock is found from 2/3 to 1 1/2 feet (0.20 to 0.46 m) below the surface. A comparison of the soils of the Saddle Rock-Malibu viticultural area to those in the existing Malibu-Newton Canyon viticultural area shows distinct soil differences. The Hambright rocky clay loam and Gilroy clay loam series dominate the Saddle Rock-Malibu area's northeast region, according to Robert Roche. He explains that although these two series are found throughout California, they contrast to the igneous rock found in the eastern area immediately beyond the Saddle Rock-Malibu viticultural area boundary line. Mr. Roche compares the Malibu-Newton Canyon viticultural area to the Saddle Rock-Malibu viticultural area by describing the Saddle Rock-Malibu area's soils as "deeper with more clay content overall, leading to more water holding capacity." He explains that the "soil series and descriptions are different enough" between the two areas to conclude that "wine characteristics would be significantly different." The northeast corner of the Saddle Rock-Malibu viticultural area, the petition states, has the most evident differences in soil as compared to the region immediately beyond the boundary line. The petition, however, emphasizes that soil differences of the Saddle Rock-Malibu area play a lesser role than the climate and physical geography in defining the distinctiveness of the viticultural area.

== Viticulture ==
The first Saddle Rock-Malibu vines were planted during 1997 and Cabernet Sauvignon, Merlot and Syrah varietals are the currently being cultivated. The vineyards are "located in a perfect micro-climate to cultivate vines that will produce grapes that ferment into particularly lush and full red wines." The Saddle Rock-Malibu name incorporates the more general geographic area of Malibu because it is nationally known, whereas Saddle Rock as a geographic area will likely only be locally known. TTB's predecessor, ATF, in 1996 established the viticultural area, "Malibu-Newton Canyon," which faced similar recognition issues. Although each of these AVA's would share "Malibu" in their names, the national recognition that Malibu has as a geographic area should minimize the likelihood of any consumer confusion regarding the two viticultural areas.
