= Malibu-Newton Canyon AVA =

Appelation that designates wine in Los Angeles County, California

Coordinates: 34°04′51″N 118°48′17″W

Malibu-Newton Canyon
- Wine region
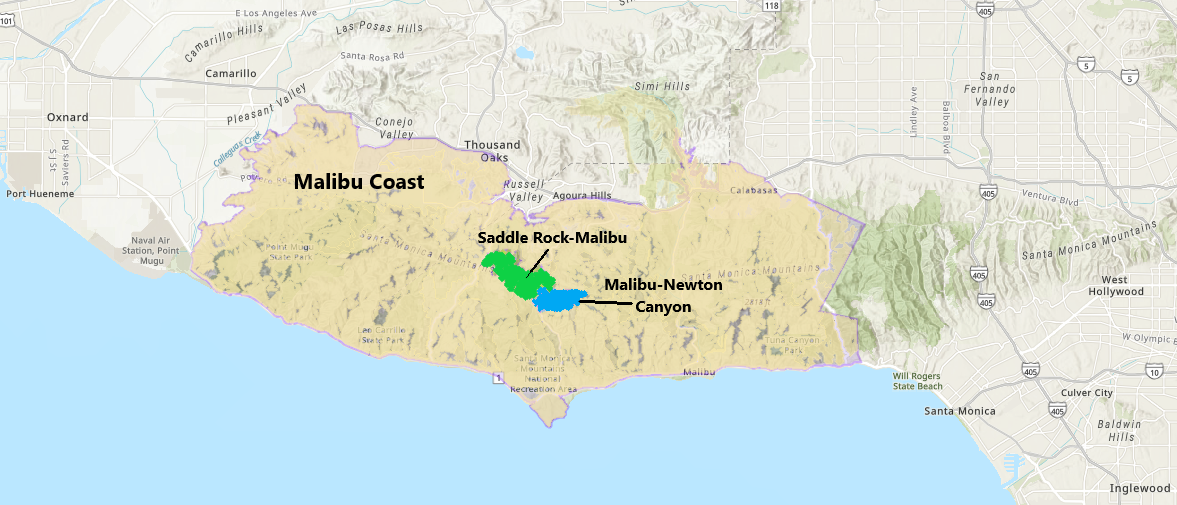
- Type: American Viticultural Area
- Year established: 1996
- Years of wine industry: 29
- Country: United States
- Part of: California, Los Angeles County , Malibu Coast AVA
- Other regions in California, Los Angeles County , Malibu Coast AVA: Saddle Rock-Malibu AVA
- Growing season: 296 days
- Climate region: Region V
- Heat units: 4,000-4,100 GDD
- Precipitation (annual average): 24 in (610 mm)
- Soil conditions: Loam to clay loam
- Total area: 850 acres (1 sq mi)
- Size of planted vineyards: 25 acres (10 ha)
- No. of vineyards: 1
- Grapes produced: Cabernet Franc, Cabernet Sauvignon, Chardonnay, Merlot, Petite Verdot, Viognier
- No. of wineries: 1

Malibu-Newton Canyon is an American Viticultural Area (AVA) located in western Los Angeles County, California, in the Malibu area . It was established as the nation's 129^{th}, the state's 76^{th} and the county's initial appellation on June 13, 1996 by the Bureau of Alcohol, Tobacco and Firearms (ATF), Treasury after reviewing the petition submitted by Mr. George Rosenthal, President of Rancho Escondido, Inc., proposing a viticultural area to be named "Malibu-Newton Canyon."
The AVA lies entirely within Newton Canyon, a mountain basin that sits just below Castro Peak, one of the highest elevations located on the oceanside of the Santa Monica Mountains. The bowl-shaped canyon is what distinguishes Malibu-Newton Canyon from the surrounding areas. Vineyards currently within the area are only located on the Rosenthal – The Malibu Estate. The Estate is a 250 acres (100 ha) property entirely within the Malibu-Newton Canyon viticultural area where approximately 25 acres (10 ha) are cultivating premium winegrapes. Varietials include Cabernet Savignon, Merlot, Cabernet Franc, Chardonnay and Petite Verdot.

== History ==
The origin of the name Malibu was thought to be an ancient Chumash Indian word "Mala I Boo" meaning "place on the cliff," and was the name of an Indian village just beyond Malibu Beach. More recently, "Malibu" may have derived from the Chumash Indian word "(hu)mal-iwu," which means, "it makes a loud noise all the time over there," referring to the sound of the surf. After the Spaniards colonized Las Californias the encompassing Chumash ranchera "Umalibo" became known as the Malibu Rancho. A Spanish settler, José Bartolomé Tapia gained control of the rancho and was later granted the land by the Spanish Governor José Joaquín de Arrillaga. The present day spelling appears on the name of the Topanga Malibu Sequit land grant dated July 12, 1805. It originally was 13,315 acres (21 sq mi), one of the largest southern California Ranchos at that time. The petition further states that throughout the 19th century, Rancho Malibu changed hands many times but remained intact. Until the construction of the Pacific Coast Highway in the 1930's, the privacy of Rancho Malibu had not been disturbed. With the burgeoning economy of southern California, conditions greatly changed. This historic rancho was finally subdivided during the same decade. Following soon after, the famous Malibu Beach Colony was established where movie stars and industry moguls began constructing their homes. The Malibu area then quickly developed into the highly recognized community of Los Angeles as it is known today.
Los Angeles County's once vibrant viticultural tradition suffered after early vineyards disappeared due to Prohibition. Newton Canyon vineyards were not re-planted with vines until 1987 by George Rosenthal, who later petitioned the ATF and was rewarded with the Malibu-Newton Canyon appellation. The petition stated that, "Newton Canyon alone is not descriptive enough to describe the general location of the viticultural area, and further, might possibly cause public confusion in relation to Newton Vineyards, located in the Napa Valley." Therefore, the petitioner proposed the name, "Malibu-Newton Canyon."

== Terroir ==
=== Topography ===
The boundaries of the Malibu-Newton Canyon viticultural area follow the natural ridge lines which define Newton Canyon and are delineated on the U.S.G.S. Point Dume, California, quadrangle map. Newton Canyon is a bowl shaped valley located on the ocean facing side of the Santa Monica Mountains, in the Malibu area of Los Angeles County. The canyon is oriented along an east-west axis and the valley floor lies at an elevation of approximately 1,400 feet (430 m). The surrounding ridgeline ranges in elevation from 1,800 to 2,000 feet (550–610 m) on the southern ocean side of the canyon, continuing to 2,100 to 2,800 feet (640–850 m) on the high side of the canyon to the north. According to the petitioner, the elevation of the southern rim of the canyon is low enough to allow evening fog to sift into the valley, but high enough to keep out the marine layer that shrouds much of the coastline throughout the daytime. The northern rim of the canyon joins the crest of the Santa Monica Mountains that divides oceanside from leeside. Lying at the eastern most side of the canyon, Castro Peak is another distinguishing feature which marks one of the highest points in the Santa Monica Mountains at 2,824 feet (861 m). The petitioner further states that approximately two-thirds of the surrounding Malibu area contains slopes greater than 25 percent, with only one-fifth having relatively level terrain.
Throughout the past several decades, most of the usable land in the Malibu area has been developed. Because of increasingly high land prices, very little of the land in the general Malibu area is still used for agriculture. The Santa Monica Mountains also have thousands of acres dedicated to State and national parks, with more acreage being aggressively acquired by public conservation agencies.

=== Climate ===
The general climate of the Malibu area is typical of southern California with mild, rainy winters, and warm, dry summers. However, there are several climatological factors which distinguish the Malibu-Newton Canyon viticultural area from the surrounding region. While summer temperatures often exceed 80 degrees in the afternoon, cooling ocean breezes flow into the valley in the evening, according to the petitioner. Moreover, during the evening and early morning a light fog often filters into the valley and settles along the slopes, creating a unique microclimate which is significantly cooler than the surrounding inland areas. Typically, the morning sun shines through the fog, which in turn is swept out by warm winds and high daytime temperatures. The valley enjoys southern exposure to the sun throughout the afternoon. According to the petition, these conditions are ideal for premium grape growing. Because of its high elevation and orientation, the viticultural area does not experience the constantly overcast skies and cooler temperatures of the coastal region immediately below. Newton Canyon, within which the viticultural area is located, is a unique pocket protected from marine influence. The coastline near sea level is a more temperate climate controlled by marine stratus with uniformly cold temperatures, fog and low clouds. This cooler and more humid coastal environment, mainly affecting areas below the 1,300-foot (400 m) level, can create grape rot and delay maturation.
The Malibu-Newton Canyon viticultural area is, in the daytime, a sunny warm oasis for a coastal location. The area is located at an elevation which lies just at the bottom of the inversion layer and just at the top of the marine layer. Typically, the marine layer ceiling is approximately 1,400 ft (430 m) on average. The southern or bottom rim of the canyon acts as a barrier to the marine layer, preventing the bulk of the coastal fog and low clouds from penetrating the valley for extended periods of time. This allows the Malibu-Newton Canyon viticultural area to enjoy favorable cooling effects of the Pacific ocean and have the warm sunny daytime temperatures found in the adjacent interior valleys. Nearby inland areas experience uniformly hot summer temperatures similar to those experienced in the upper elevations on the oceanside of the Santa Monica Mountains. However, these inland areas receive little or no fog and much less precipitation than the oceanside regime, according to the petitioner. An additional distinctive aspect is an increasing amount of precipitation with increasing elevation. The petitioner states that upland weather stations report practically twice the mean precipitation of the nearby lowland stations. Furthermore, the greatest monthly precipitation during the rainy season is from 1.5 to 3.0 times as great as that for the lowland stations. Precipitation is concentrated in the winter months. The average annual rainfall is about 24 inches (610 mm), with approximately 12 percent occurring from the months of April to October. The viticultural area experiences typical low temperatures in the winter time, just above freezing temperatures. Infrequent winter freezes have been known to occur during the dormant winter growing cycle. In summary, the petition states that the viticultural area is characterized by an isolated microclimate that captures the favorable climatic conditions necessary for premium wine grape growing. In contrast, the petitioner states that the surrounding areas found on the oceanside of the Santa Monica Mountains (i.e, Malibu, Oxnard, Santa Monica) are uniformly cool and overcast. Surrounding inland areas found on the leeside of the Santa Monica Mountains (i.e, Thousand Oaks, Agoura and Woodland Hills) are uniformly hot and dry. The plant hardiness zones are 10a to 10b.

=== Soils ===
Major soils within the viticultural area range from loam to clay loam in texture. Subsoil texture ranges from clay loam to clay. Current plantings are mainly on Castaic and Rincon silty clay loams and Malibu loam which are lower elevation terrace soils that are moderately deep, with favorable Capability Class ratings of II to IV. Steeper hillside soils (mostly above the 1,700 foot contour line) are shallower with Capability Class ratings ranging from IV to VIII. Soils in the viticultural area have moderate to high inherent fertility. Soil reaction in surface soils ranges from moderately acid to slightly alkaline. Subsoil pH varies with type and several areas are calcareous. According to the petitioner, soil tests performed prior to the planting of vineyards in 1988 revealed that the topsoil found in much of lower Newton Canyon contained crushed rock, as a result of the construction of the nearby Kanan Dume Road tunnel, which is ideal for good drainage. The surrounding areas are mainly steep hillsides and mountainous uplands with poor soil capability. These soils are usually shallower than those found in the viticultural area, and are subject to erosion.
