= Matthew Lane =

New Zealand golfer

Personal information
- Nationality: New Zealand
- Born: 8 August 1968 (age 58) Wellington, New Zealand

Career
- Sport: Golf
- College: University of Oklahoma
- Status: Professional
- Former tours: Nationwide Tour (1995–98); Asian Tour; PGA Tour of Australasia; Canadian Tour
- Professional wins: 1

Number of wins by tour
- PGA Tour of Australasia: 1

Matthew Lane (born 8 August 1968) is a New Zealand professional golfer.

== Early life and amateur career ==
In 1968, Lane was born in Wellington, New Zealand. He attended the University of Oklahoma in the United States on a golf scholarship from 1986 to 1990 and was a member of the winning team at the 1989 NCAA Division I Men's Golf Championships. He earned All-American honors three years while at the University of Oklahoma.

== Professional career ==
Following college, Lane turned pro and began a career playing on the Asian Tour, PGA Tour of Australasia, Canadian Tour, European Tour and Nationwide Tour.

Lane's career culminated with a win at the 1998 New Zealand Open which was held at Formosa Golf Resort. Without playing privileges on any of the major professional golf tours, he did not intend on attending the New Zealand Open that year. It was only after his father paid for his airfair to travel to New Zealand that Lane decided to attend. He was forced to Monday qualify for the tournament and after successfully doing so went on to shoot rounds of 72, 69, 74, 64 for a -9 total of 279. The final round 64 was the low round of the tournament and he beat Australian Rod Pampling by 3 strokes.

Lane's golf career was hindered by poor eyesight. Over the years he has had two cornea transplant surgeries, one of which was so bad it forced him to stop playing competitive professional golf in 2001.

== Personal life ==
Lane currently resides in Agoura Hills, California where he teaches golf at the Lindero Country Club. He is married to Terri and they have two children: Ashley and Nicolas.

== Professional wins (1) ==
=== PGA Tour of Australasia wins (1) ===
No.	Date	Tournament	Winning score	Margin of victory	Runner-up
1	13 Dec 1998	New Zealand Open	−9 (72-69-74-64=279)	3 strokes	(Australia) Rod Pampling
