= List of United States Supreme Court cases, volume 130 =

Supreme Court of the United States
- Interactive map of Supreme Court of the United States
- 38°53′26″N 77°00′16″W
- Established: March 4, 1789; 236 years ago
- Location: Washington, D.C.
- Coordinates: 38°53′26″N 77°00′16″W
- Composition method: Presidential nomination with Senate confirmation
- Authorised by: Constitution of the United States, Art. III, § 1
- Judge term length: life tenure, subject to impeachment and removal
- Number of positions: 9 (by statute)
- Website: supremecourt.gov

This is a list of cases reported in volume 130 of United States Reports, decided by the Supreme Court of the United States in 1889.

== Justices of the Supreme Court at the time of volume 130 U.S. ==
The Supreme Court is established by Article III, Section 1 of the Constitution of the United States, which says: "The judicial Power of the United States, shall be vested in one supreme Court . . .". The size of the Court is not specified; the Constitution leaves it to Congress to set the number of justices. Under the Judiciary Act of 1789 Congress originally fixed the number of justices at six (one chief justice and five associate justices). Since 1789 Congress has varied the size of the Court from six to seven, nine, ten, and back to nine justices (always including one chief justice).

When the cases in volume 130 U.S. were decided the Court comprised the following nine members:

Portrait	Justice	Office	Home State	Succeeded	Date confirmed by the Senate (Vote)	Tenure on Supreme Court
	Melville Fuller	Chief Justice	Illinois	Morrison Waite	July 20, 1888 (41–20)	October 8, 1888 – July 4, 1910 (Died)
	Samuel Freeman Miller	Associate Justice	Iowa	Peter Vivian Daniel	July 16, 1862 (Acclamation)	July 21, 1862 – October 13, 1890 (Died)
	Stephen Johnson Field	Associate Justice	California	newly created seat	March 10, 1863 (Acclamation)	May 10, 1863 – December 1, 1897 (Retired)
	Joseph P. Bradley	Associate Justice	New Jersey	newly created seat	March 21, 1870 (46–9)	March 23, 1870 – January 22, 1892 (Died)
	John Marshall Harlan	Associate Justice	Kentucky	David Davis	November 29, 1877 (Acclamation)	December 10, 1877 – October 14, 1911 (Died)
	Stanley Matthews	Associate Justice	Ohio	Noah Haynes Swayne	May 12, 1881 (24–23)	May 17, 1881 – March 22, 1889 (Died)
	Horace Gray	Associate Justice	Massachusetts	Nathan Clifford	December 20, 1881 (51–5)	January 9, 1882 – September 15, 1902 (Died)
	Samuel Blatchford	Associate Justice	New York	Ward Hunt	March 22, 1882 (Acclamation)	April 3, 1882 – July 7, 1893 (Died)
	Lucius Quintus Cincinnatus Lamar	Associate Justice	Mississippi	William Burnham Woods	January 16, 1888 (32–28)	January 18, 1888 – January 23, 1893 (Died)

== Notable Case in 130 U.S. ==
=== Chae Chan Ping v. United States ===
Chae Chan Ping v. United States, 130 U.S. 581 (1889), also known as the Chinese Exclusion Case, was a challenge to the Scott Act of 1888, an addendum to the Chinese Exclusion Act of 1882. One ground of challenge was conflict with the Burlingame Treaty of 1868 between the United States and China. The Supreme Court rejected the challenge and upheld the authority of the US federal government to set immigration policy and pass new legislation even if it overrode the terms of existing treaties. The decision was an important precedent for judicial deference to the plenary power of the legislative branch in immigration law, and federal authority to overturn the terms of international treaties.

== Citation style ==
Under the Judiciary Act of 1789 the federal court structure at the time comprised District Courts, which had general trial jurisdiction; Circuit Courts, which had mixed trial and appellate (from the US District Courts) jurisdiction; and the United States Supreme Court, which had appellate jurisdiction over the federal District and Circuit courts—and for certain issues over state courts. The Supreme Court also had limited original jurisdiction (i.e., in which cases could be filed directly with the Supreme Court without first having been heard by a lower federal or state court). There were one or more federal District Courts and/or Circuit Courts in each state, territory, or other geographical region.

Bluebook citation style is used for case names, citations, and jurisdictions.

- "C.C.D." = United States Circuit Court for the District of . . .
  - e.g.,"C.C.D.N.J." = United States Circuit Court for the District of New Jersey
- "D." = United States District Court for the District of . . .
  - e.g.,"D. Mass." = United States District Court for the District of Massachusetts
- "E." = Eastern; "M." = Middle; "N." = Northern; "S." = Southern; "W." = Western
  - e.g.,"C.C.S.D.N.Y." = United States Circuit Court for the Southern District of New York
  - e.g.,"M.D. Ala." = United States District Court for the Middle District of Alabama
- "Ct. Cl." = United States Court of Claims
- The abbreviation of a state's name alone indicates the highest appellate court in that state's judiciary at the time.
  - e.g.,"Pa." = Supreme Court of Pennsylvania
  - e.g.,"Me." = Supreme Judicial Court of Maine

== List of cases in volume 130 U.S. ==
Case Name	Page & year	Opinion of the Court	Concurring opinion(s)	Dissenting opinion(s)	Lower court	Disposition
Oregon Railroad and Navigation Company v. Oregonian Railway Company, Ltd.	1 (1889)	Miller	none	Field	C.C.D. Or.	reversed
Badger v. Cusimano	39 (1889)	Harlan	none	none	C.C.E.D. La.	affirmed
Parker v. Dacres	43 (1889)	Harlan	none	none	Sup. Ct. Terr. Wash.	affirmed
Ballard v. Searls	50 (1889)	Bradley	none	none	C.C.E.D. Mich.	remanded
Collins Company v. Coes	56 (1889)	Fuller	none	none	C.C.D. Mass.	affirmed
Arkansas Valley Land and Cattle Company v. Mann	69 (1889)	Harlan	none	none	C.C.D. Colo.	affirmed
United States v. Watson	80 (1889)	Lamar	none	none	C.C.D.	affirmed
Calton v. Utah	83 (1889)	Harlan	none	none	Sup. Ct. Terr. Utah	reversed
Brown v. District of Columbia	87 (1889)	Fuller	none	none	Sup. Ct. D.C.	affirmed
Richardson v. Green	104 (1889)	Blatchford	none	none	C.C.W.D. Mich.	dismissed
Thompson v. Hall	117 (1889)	Blatchford	none	none	C.C.E.D.N.Y.	affirmed
Moore v. Crawford	122 (1889)	Fuller	none	none	C.C.W.D. Mich.	affirmed
Bullitt County v. Washer	142 (1889)	Lamar	none	none	C.C.D. Ky.	affirmed
Rude v. Westcott	152 (1889)	Field	none	none	C.C.D. Ind.	reversed
Smith v. Adams	167 (1889)	Field	none	none	Sup. Ct. Terr. Dakota	dismissed
Lyon v. Alley	177 (1889)	Lamar	none	none	Sup. Ct. D.C.	affirmed
Williamson v. New Jersey	189 (1889)	Blatchford	none	none	N.J. Sup. Ct.	affirmed
The Alaska	201 (1889)	Blatchford	none	none	C.C.S.D.N.Y.	affirmed
Baltimore and Potomac Railroad Company v. Hopkins	210 (1889)	Fuller	none	none	Sup. Ct. D.C.	dismissed
District of Columbia v. Gannon	227 (1889)	Fuller	none	none	Sup. Ct. D.C.	dismissed
District of Columbia v. Emerson	229 (1889)	Fuller	none	none	Sup. Ct. D.C.	dismissed
Stevens v. Nichols	230 (1889)	Harlan	none	none	C.C.W.D. Mo.	reversed
Buxton v. Traver	232 (1889)	Field	none	none	Cal.	affirmed
Botiller v. Dominguez	238 (1889)	Miller	none	none	Cal.	reversed
Parley's Park Silver Mining Company v. Kerr	256 (1889)	Lamar	none	none	Sup. Ct. Terr. Utah	affirmed
United States v. Insley	263 (1889)	Blatchford	none	none	C.C.D. Kan.	reversed
Manhattan Bank v. Walker	267 (1889)	Blatchford	none	none	C.C.W.D. Tenn.	reversed
United States v. Pile	280 (1889)	Miller	none	none	C.C.M.D. Tenn.	dismissed
Davies v. Miller	284 (1889)	Gray	none	none	C.C.S.D.N.Y.	reversed
Hammer v. Garfield Mining and Milling Company	291 (1889)	Field	none	none	Sup. Ct. Terr. Mont.	affirmed
Amy v. City of Watertown I	301 (1889)	Bradley	none	none	C.C.W.D. Wis.	affirmed
Amy v. City of Watertown II	320 (1889)	Bradley	none	none	C.C.W.D. Wis.	affirmed
Knowlton v. City of Watertown I	327 (1889)	Bradley	none	none	C.C.W.D. Wis.	affirmed
Knowlton v. City of Watertown II	334 (1889)	per curiam	none	none	C.C.W.D. Wis.	affirmed
United States v. Averill	335 (1889)	Blatchford	none	none	Sup. Ct. Terr. Utah	reversed
Brock v. Northwestern Fuel Company	341 (1889)	Harlan	none	none	C.C.N.D. Iowa	reversed
In re Gon-Shay-Ee	343 (1889)	Miller	none	none	D. Terr. Ariz.	habeas corpus granted
In re Captain Jack	353 (1889)	Miller	none	none	not indicated	habeas corpus granted
Reynes v. F. Dumont and Company	354 (1889)	Fuller	none	none	C.C.S.D.N.Y.	reversed
Gibbs v. Consolidated Gas Company	396 (1889)	Fuller	none	none	C.C.D. Md.	affirmed
Robertson v. Salomon	412 (1889)	Bradley	none	none	C.C.S.D.N.Y.	reversed
Friedlander and Company v. Texas and Pacific Railway Company	416 (1889)	Fuller	none	none	C.C.E.D. Tex.	affirmed
Shepherd v. Baltimore and Ohio Railroad Company	426 (1889)	Harlan	none	none	C.C.S.D. Ohio	reversed
Town of Andes v. Slauson	435 (1889)	Gray	none	none	C.C.N.D.N.Y.	affirmed
Badeau v. United States	439 (1889)	Fuller	none	none	Ct. Cl.	affirmed
United States v. Cumming	452 (1889)	Harlan	none	none	Ct. Cl.	reversed
Hurlbut v. Schillinger	456 (1889)	Blatchford	none	none	C.C.N.D. Ill.	affirmed
Wilson v. Edmonds	472 (1889)	Blatchford	none	none	Sup. Ct. D.C.	affirmed
Central Trust Company v. Seasongood	482 (1889)	Harlan	none	none	C.C.S.D. Ohio	affirmed
Hassall v. Wilcox	493 (1889)	Blatchford	none	none	C.C.W.D. Tex.	reversed
Kilbourn v. Sunderland	505 (1889)	Fuller	none	none	Sup. Ct. D.C.	multiple
Stillwell and Bierce Manufacturing Company v. Phelps	520 (1889)	Gray	none	none	C.C.E.D. Wis.	affirmed
Butler v. Boston and Savannah Steamship Company	527 (1889)	Bradley	none	none	C.C.D. Mass.	affirmed
Huling v. Kaw Valley Railway and Improvement Company	559 (1889)	Miller	none	none	C.C.D. Kan.	affirmed
Union Trust Company v. Southern Inland Navigation and Improvement Company	565 (1889)	Harlan	none	none	C.C.N.D. Fla.	affirmed
Synnott v. Shaughnessy	572 (1889)	Lamar	none	none	Sup. Ct. Terr. Idaho	affirmed
Chae Chan Ping v. United States	581 (1889)	Field	none	none	C.C.N.D. Cal.	affirmed
New York and Colorado Mining Syndicate and Company v. Fraser	611 (1889)	Lamar	none	none	C.C.D. Colo.	affirmed
Redfield v. Parks	623 (1889)	Blatchford	none	none	C.C.E.D. Ark.	certiorari issued
Peters v. Active Manufacturing Company	626 (1889)	Blatchford	none	none	C.C.S.D. Ohio	affirmed
McKinley v. Wheeler	630 (1889)	Field	none	none	C.C.D. Colo.	reversed
Pickard v. East Tennessee, Virginia and Georgia Railway Company	637 (1889)	Field	none	none	C.C.M.D. Tenn.	reversed
Andrus v. St. Louis Smelting and Refining Company	643 (1889)	Field	none	none	C.C.D. Colo.	affirmed
Dunlap v. Northeastern Railroad Company	649 (1889)	Fuller	none	none	C.C.N.D. Ga.	reversed
United States v. Haynes	653 (1889)	Gray	none	none	C.C.W.D. Tex.	dismissed
District of Columbia v. Cornell	655 (1889)	Gray	none	none	Ct. Cl.	reversed
Lake County v. Rollins	662 (1889)	Lamar	none	none	C.C.D. Colo.	reversed
Lake County v. Graham	674 (1889)	Lamar	none	none	C.C.D. Colo.	reversed
Jones v. Van Doren	684 (1889)	Gray	none	none	C.C.D. Minn.	reversed
Michigan Ins. Bank v. Eldred	693 (1889)	Gray	none	none	C.C.E.D. Wis.	reversed
Hill v. Harding	699 (1889)	Gray	none	none	Ill.	affirmed
