= Agoura Hills, California =

City in California, United States

- City
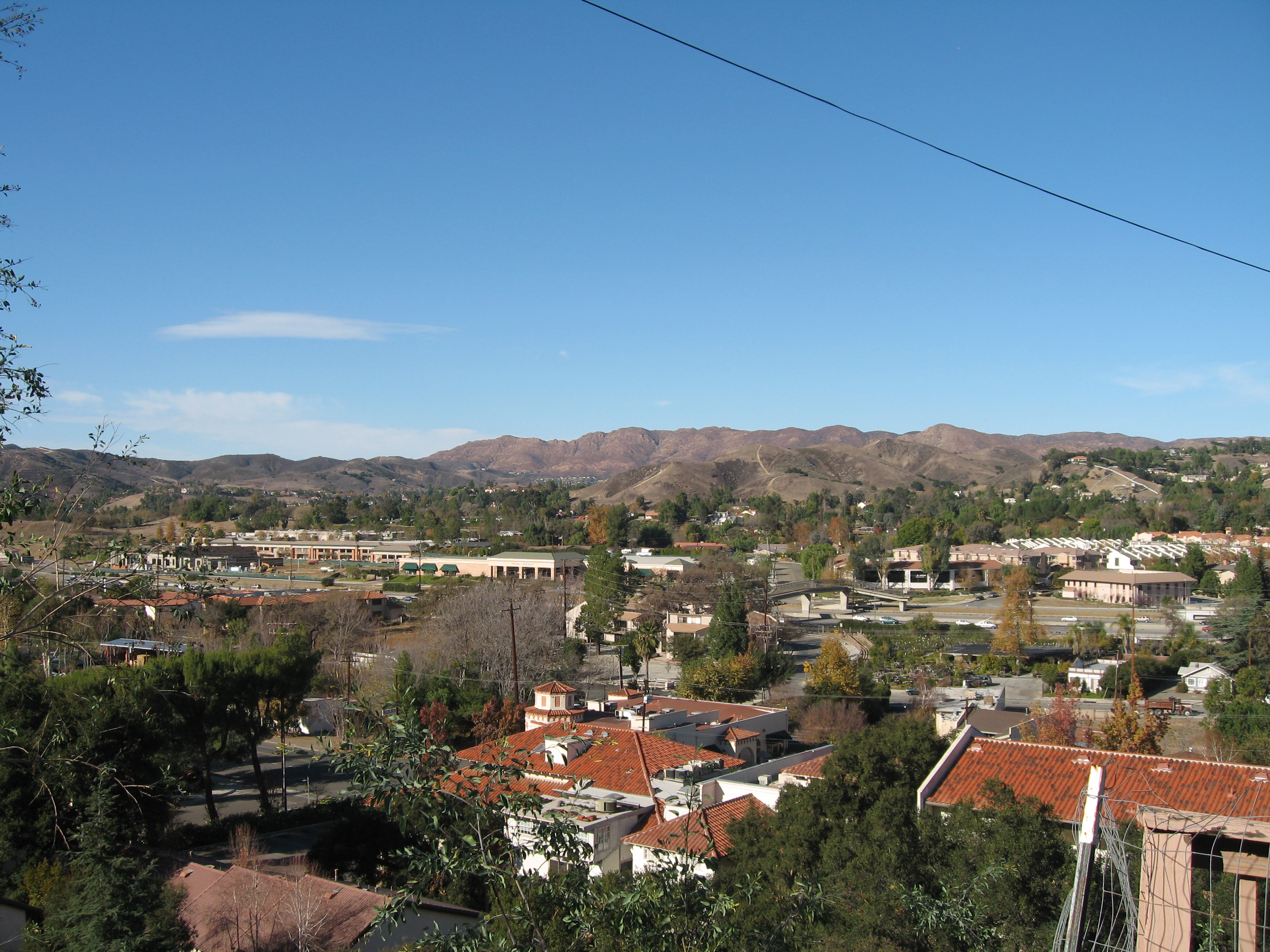
- View of Agoura Hills looking from southern edge of the Historic Quarter in December 2006

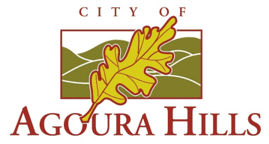
- Logo
- Motto: "The Gateway to the Santa Monica Mountains"
- Interactive map of Agoura Hills, California
- Location of Agoura Hills in the Los Angeles metropolitan area Location of Agoura Hills in California Location of Agoura Hills in the United States
- Coordinates: 34°9′12″N 118°45′42″W
- Country: United States
- State: California
- County: Los Angeles
- Region: Conejo Valley
- Settled (by the Spanish): 1700s
- Incorporated: December 8, 1982
- Named for: Don Pierre Agoure

Government
  - Type: City Council/City Manager
  - Mayor: Jeremy Wolf
  - Mayor pro tem: Deborah Klein Lopez
  - City Council: Chris Anstead; Kate Anderson; Penny Sylvester
  - City Manager: Nathan Hamburger

Area
  - Total: 7.82 sq mi (20.25 km^{2})
  - Land: 7.80 sq mi (20.19 km^{2})
  - Water: 0.023 sq mi (0.06 km^{2}) 0.37%
- Elevation: 922 ft (281 m)

Population (2020)
  - Total: 20,299
  - Density: 2,603.9/sq mi (1,005.37/km^{2})
- Time zone: UTC−8 (Pacific Time Zone)
  - Summer (DST): UTC−7 (PDT)
- ZIP Codes: 91301, 91376–91377
- Area code: 747/818
- FIPS code: 06-00394
- GNIS feature IDs: 1733436, 2409666
- Website: www.agourahillscity.gov

Agoura Hills (/əˈɡɔːrə ˈhɪlz/) is a city situated in the Santa Monica Mountains region of Los Angeles County, California, United States. Its population was 20,330 as of the 2010 census, and decreased to 20,299 in 2020. A suburb of Los Angeles, Agoura Hills lies in the eastern Conejo Valley, between the Simi Hills and the Santa Monica Mountains. Located 35 miles (56 km) northwest of Downtown Los Angeles and less than 10 miles (16 km) west of the Los Angeles city limits at Woodland Hills, Agoura Hills is bordered by Bell Canyon and Ventura County. Neighboring communities include Calabasas, Oak Park, and Westlake Village, while the unincorporated area of Agoura sits adjacent.

== History ==
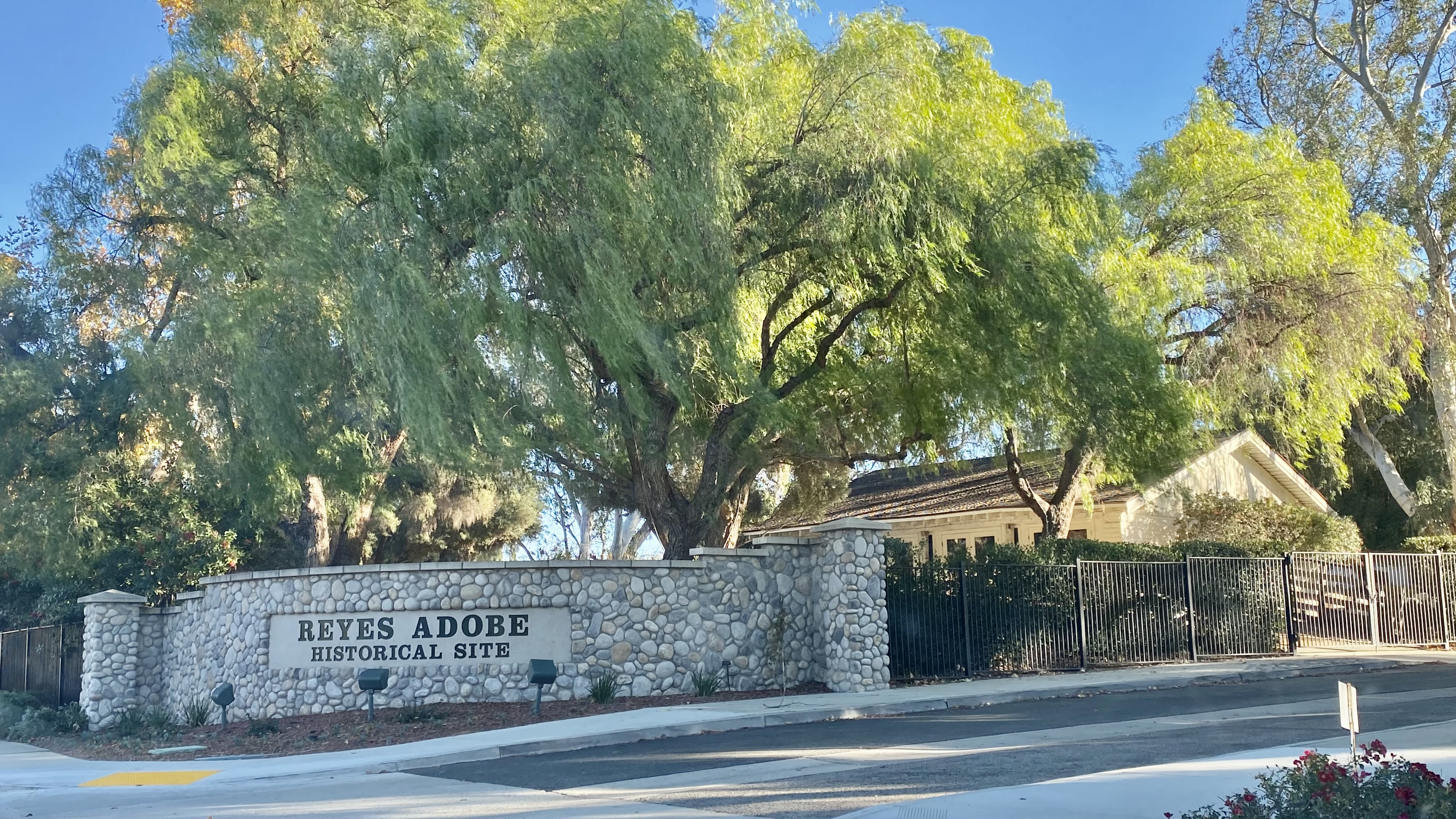
The Reyes Adobe, built c. 1850 on Rancho Las Vírgenes.

The area was first settled by the Chumash Native Americans around 10,000 years ago. The Alta California (Upper California) coast was settled by Spanish Franciscan missionaries in the late 18th century.

In about 1800, Miguel Ortega was granted a Spanish grazing concession called Rancho Las Virgenes or El Rancho de Nuestra Señora La Reina de Las Virgenes. The grant was abandoned after Ortega's death in 1810, and José Maria Dominguez was given Rancho Las Virgenes as a Mexican land grant in 1834. Maria Antonia Machado de Reyes purchased the rancho from Dominguez in 1845. (The "Reyes Adobe" ranch headquarters sits today in central Agoura Hills, where it is part of the Reyes Adobe Museum built around 2004 and owned by the Los Angeles County Parks and Recreation Department.)

By 1900, the area was being used as a popular stage stop for travelers because of its natural spring.

In the 1920s, the community was briefly known as Picture City, as Paramount Pictures owned a ranch known as Paramount Ranch used for filming Westerns. To obtain a post office of their own, the residents were required to choose a one-word name, and in 1927 chose the shortest name proposed: a misspelling of the last name of Pierre Agoure, a local Basque man and French immigrant who had settled in the area in 1871 to live the lifestyle of the Mexican rancher. Styling himself Don Pierre Agoure, he was a successful sheep herder.

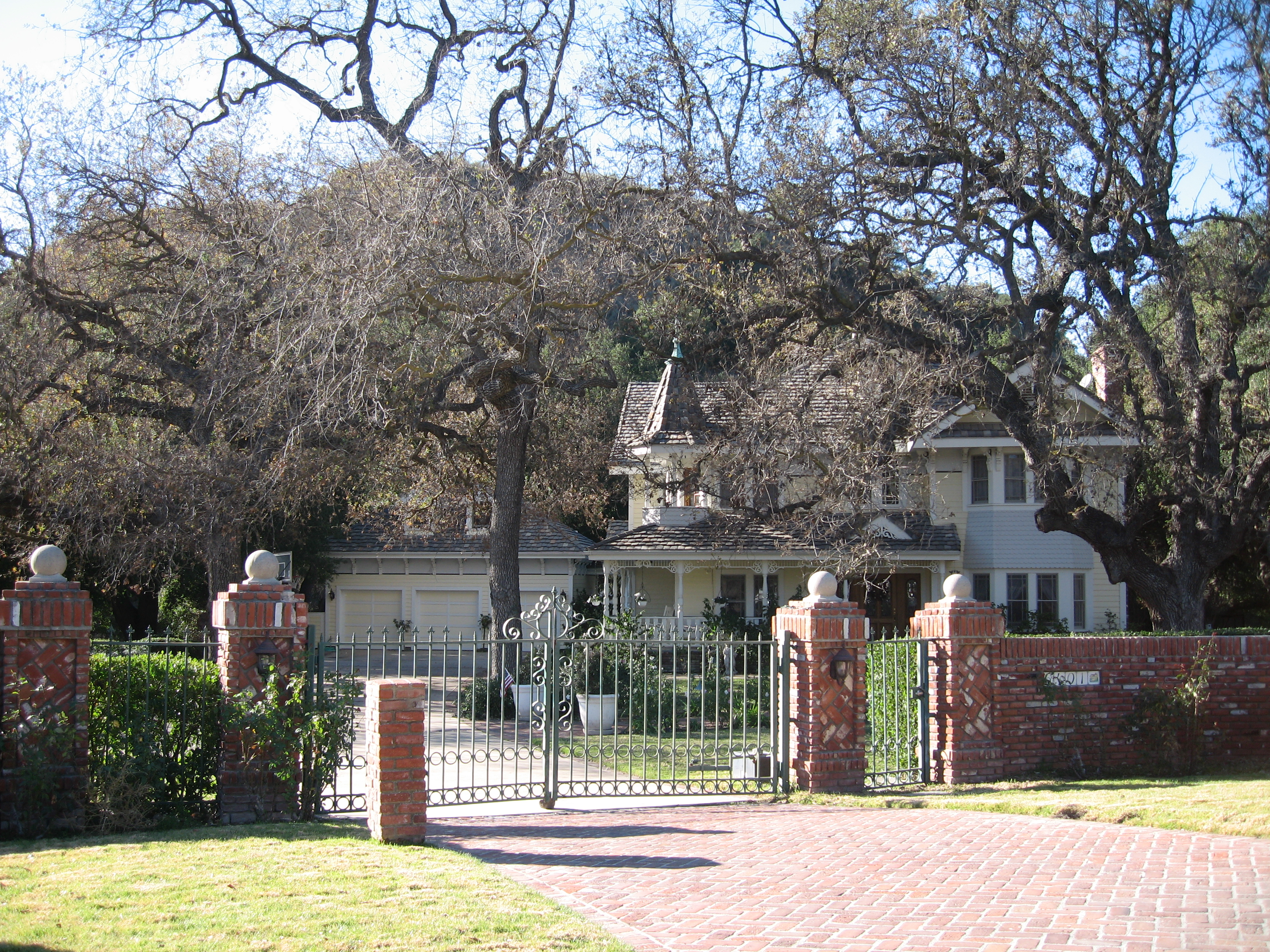
An estate in Old Agoura

Agoura began to grow in the late 1960s after the Ventura Freeway section of U.S. Route 101 was built through the area, dividing the community into northern and southern sections. The first housing tracts in Agoura were Hillrise, Liberty Canyon and Lake Lindero. Rapid growth continued during the 1970s when schools were built and much of downtown erected.

In 1982, the residents of the proposed city voted in favor of cityhood by a 68% majority. Agoura Hills became the 83rd City in Los Angeles County. Elected to the first City Council were Mayor Fran Pavley, Mayor Pro Tem Carol Sahm, Councilmembers Ernest Dynda, John Hood, and Vicky Leary. Incorporating a year after neighboring Westlake Village, the drive for cityhood in the region was largely based on public discontent with the county's failure to limit residential development of the area, motives that influenced Calabasas to follow suit in 1991.

The 1980s was a period of growth, with large land areas being subdivided into housing tracts. In the 1990s, businesses set up shop downtown including shops and restaurants.

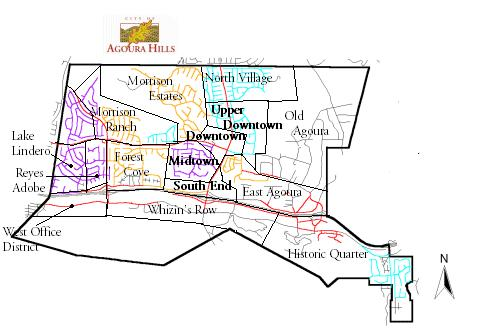
Map showing Agoura Hills districts

In 1995, the murder of Jimmy Farris awakened the city to a rising drug problem and petty theft by its young. As a result, the city began sponsoring live music competitions and concerts in local parks.

In November 2018, the Woolsey Fire occurred during Santa Ana winds burning through the community. One victim was found in the ruins of an Agoura Hills home.

In January 2025, many areas of Agoura Hills and neighboring Oak Park were under evacuation warnings due to the Kenneth Fire.

=== Music ===
Agoura Hills is known regionally for its live music scene and originality in the nu metal scene, a fame that has given rise to such acts as Linkin Park, Dub Thompson, Skye Aspen, Incubus, Hoobastank, and Fort Minor.

Agoura Hills is home to The Canyon Club, a concert venue that hosts touring acts such as Peter Frampton, Smash Mouth, Pat Benatar, Cyndi Lauper, REO Speedwagon, X, Steel Pulse, The New Cars, Asia, Boyz II Men, Alan Parsons, Foreigner, Bret Michaels and The Smithereens.

== Geography ==
According to the United States Census Bureau, the city has a total area of 8.2 square miles (21 km^{2}), of which 8.2 square miles (21 km^{2}) is land and 0.04 square mile (0.1 km^{2}) (0.37%) is water.

Agoura Hills has a mountain called Ballard Mountain named after pioneer settler and freed slave John Ballard. The name of the mountain was officially changed from Negrohead to Ballard in a ceremony on February 20, 2010. Ladyface Mountain is another prominent mountain on the west side of the Conejo Valley and stands at an elevation of 2,031 feet (619 m).

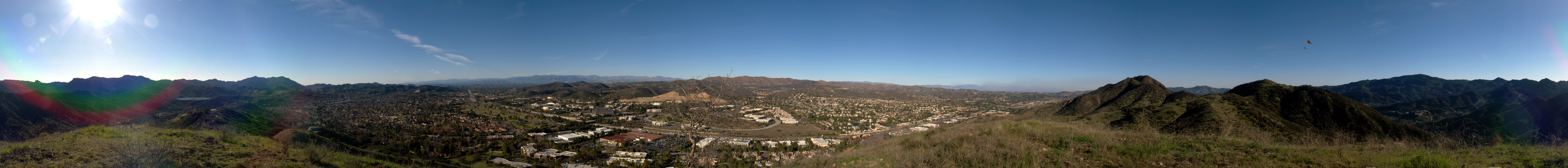
Panorama of Agoura Hills and Westlake Village with Ballard Mountain prominent as the leftmost peak in the image

Agoura Hills is called the "Gateway to the Santa Monica Mountains National Recreation Area".

=== Environment ===
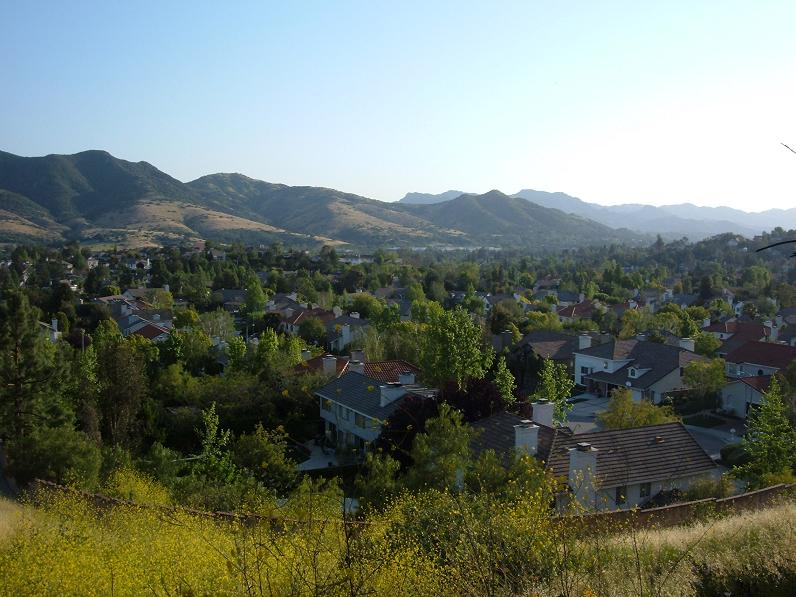
Western Agoura Hills from the hills north of Morrison Ranch

Natural areas of Agoura Hills are part of the California chaparral and woodlands ecoregion and are covered by hundreds of local plant species, some of which are very rare, and others of which have become popular ornamentals. The range is host to an immense variety of wildlife, from mountain lions to the endangered Southern California Distinct Population Segment of steelhead. The mountain lion population within the Santa Monica Mountains (which includes the Simi Hills & Santa Susana Pass) is severely depleted with only seven known living adult individuals. The primary cause of the decline is due to a combination of traffic-related mortality (three from the area were killed within a matter of months,) anti-coagulants ingested from human-poisoned prey (two individuals within the Simi Hills), and attacks by other, more dominant mountain lions (an elder male, known as P1, killed both his son and his mate, this is thought to be due to a lack of space available.)

The Wallis Annenberg Wildlife Crossing is a vegetated overpass spanning the Ventura Freeway and Agoura Road at Liberty Canyon on the east end of the city. Snakes are common but only occasionally seen. Local species include the Southern Pacific Rattlesnake, Mountain Kingsnake, California Kingsnake, Gopher snake, and Garter snake. The mountains are also home to the Western fence lizard.

=== Invasive species ===
In 2010, the Los Angeles Times reported that the New Zealand mud snail had infested watersheds in the Santa Monica Mountains, posing serious threats to native species and complicating efforts to improve stream-water quality for the endangered steelhead trout. According to the article, the snails have expanded "from the first confirmed sample in Medea Creek in Agoura Hills to nearly 30 other stream sites in four years." Researchers at the Santa Monica Bay Restoration Commission believe that the snails' expansion may have been expedited after the mollusks traveled from stream to stream on the gear of contractors and volunteers.

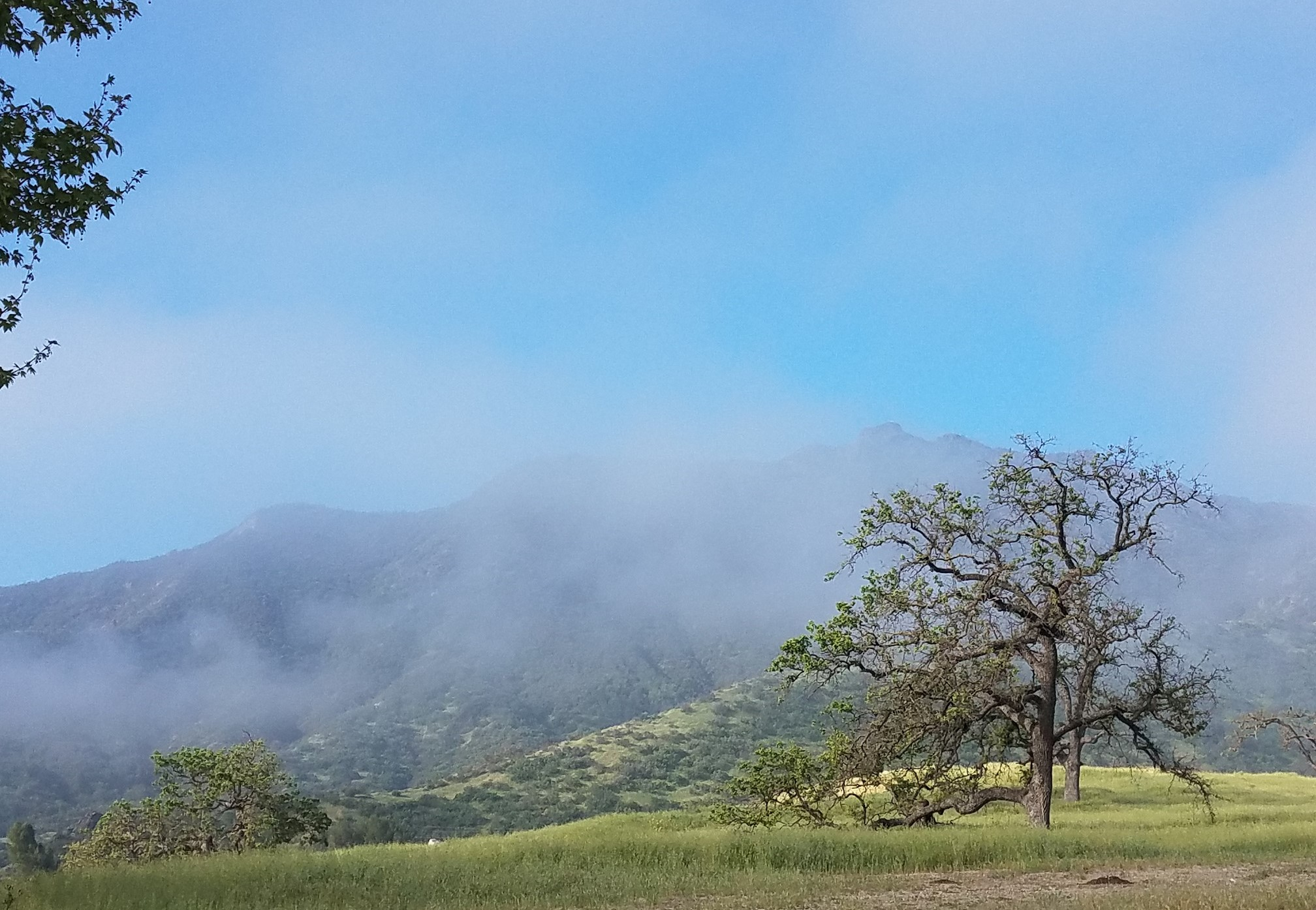
Agoura Hills morning fog burns off.

=== Climate ===
Climate data for Agoura Hills, California
Month	Jan	Feb	Mar	Apr	May	Jun	Jul	Aug	Sep	Oct	Nov	Dec	Year
Record high °F (°C)	87 (31)	86 (30)	92 (33)	99 (37)	105 (41)	104 (40)	105 (41)	106 (41)	108 (42)	104 (40)	93 (34)	82 (28)	108 (42)
Mean daily maximum °F (°C)	67 (19)	69 (21)	70 (21)	76 (24)	78 (26)	85 (29)	91 (33)	92 (33)	89 (32)	82 (28)	73 (23)	67 (19)	78 (26)
Mean daily minimum °F (°C)	42 (6)	43 (6)	44 (7)	46 (8)	50 (10)	54 (12)	57 (14)	58 (14)	56 (13)	51 (11)	44 (7)	41 (5)	49 (9)
Record low °F (°C)	28 (−2)	28 (−2)	32 (0)	37 (3)	42 (6)	47 (8)	47 (8)	47 (8)	43 (6)	39 (4)	31 (−1)	28 (−2)	28 (−2)
Average precipitation inches (mm)	4.29 (109)	4.38 (111)	3.45 (88)	0.95 (24)	0.30 (7.6)	0.05 (1.3)	0.03 (0.76)	0.14 (3.6)	0.26 (6.6)	0.54 (14)	1.59 (40)	2.43 (62)	18.40 (467)

== Demographics ==
Historical population
Census	Pop.	Note	%±
1990	20,390		—
2000	20,537		0.7%
2010	20,330		−1.0%
2020	20,299		−0.2%
U.S. Decennial Census; 1860–1870 1880–1890; 1900 1910 1920; 1930 1940 1950; 1960 1970 1980; 1990 2000 2010; 2020

Agoura Hills first appeared as a city in the 1990 U.S. census, part of the Calabasas census community division (CCD).

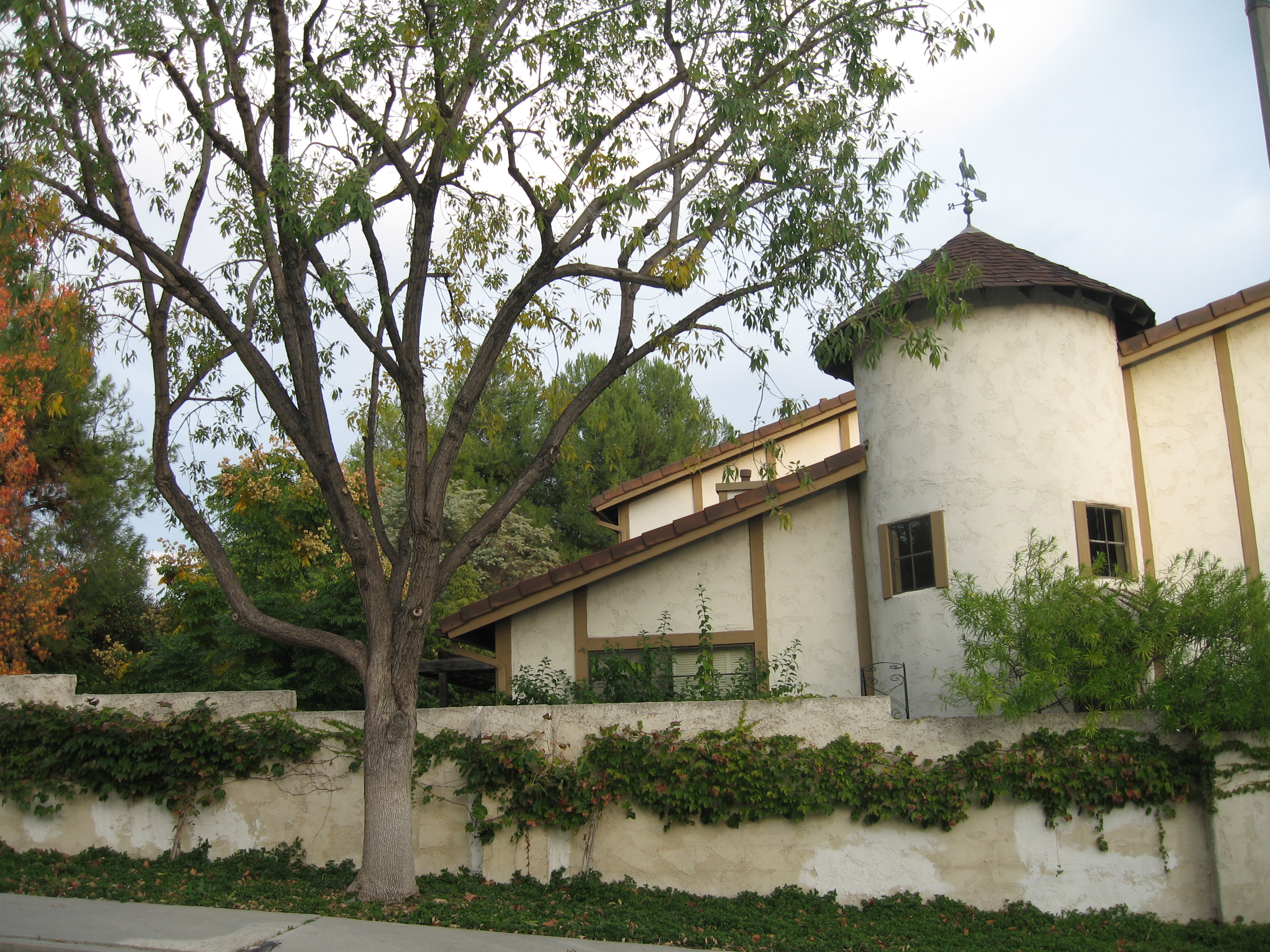
Strawberry Hill Apartments, in the Forest Grove neighborhood

=== Racial and ethnic composition ===
Agoura Hills city, California – Racial and ethnic composition Note: the US Census treats Hispanic/Latino as an ethnic category. This table excludes Latinos from the racial categories and assigns them to a separate category. Hispanics/Latinos may be of any race.
Race / Ethnicity (NH = Non-Hispanic)	Pop 1990	Pop 2000	Pop 2010	Pop 2020	% 1990	% 2000	% 2010	% 2020
White alone (NH)	17,475	16,993	15,971	14,744	85.70%	82.74%	78.56%	72.63%
Black or African American alone (NH)	228	268	256	250	1.12%	1.30%	1.26%	1.23%
Native American or Alaska Native alone (NH)	57	27	26	23	0.28%	0.13%	0.13%	0.11%
Asian alone (NH)	1,377	1,325	1,503	1,740	6.75%	6.45%	7.39%	8.57%
Native Hawaiian or Pacific Islander alone (NH)	1,377	21	22	6	6.75%	0.10%	0.11%	0.03%
Other race alone (NH)	10	39	51	130	0.05%	0.19%	0.25%	0.64%
Mixed race or Multiracial (NH)	x	457	565	1,087	x	2.23%	2.78%	5.35%
Hispanic or Latino (any race)	1,243	1,407	1,936	2,319	6.10%	6.85%	9.52%	11.42%
Total	20,390	20,537	20,330	20,299	100.00%	100.00%	100.00%	100.00%

=== 2020 census ===
As of the 2020 census, Agoura Hills had a population of 20,299 and a population density of 2,604.1 inhabitants per square mile (1,005.4/km^{2}). 99.8% of residents lived in urban areas, while 0.2% lived in rural areas.

The age distribution was 21.4% under the age of 18, 8.1% aged 18 to 24, 20.0% aged 25 to 44, 30.6% aged 45 to 64, and 19.8% who were 65 years of age or older. The median age was 45.3 years. For every 100 females, there were 94.0 males, and for every 100 females age 18 and over there were 91.3 males.

There were 7,427 households, of which 34.4% had children under the age of 18 living in them. Of all households, 61.2% were married-couple households, 4.2% were cohabiting couple households, 12.6% were households with a male householder and no spouse or partner present, and 22.0% were households with a female householder and no spouse or partner present. About 18.2% of all households were made up of individuals and 8.2% had someone living alone who was 65 years of age or older. The average household size was 2.71. There were 5,704 families (76.8% of all households).

The census reported that 99.3% of the population lived in households and 148 people (0.7%) were institutionalized.

There were 7,621 housing units, of which 2.5% were vacant. The homeowner vacancy rate was 0.3% and the rental vacancy rate was 4.7%. Of the 7,427 occupied housing units, 74.8% were owner-occupied, and 25.2% were occupied by renters.

Racial composition as of the 2020 census
Race	Number	Percentage
White	15,279	75.3%
Black or African American	262	1.3%
American Indian and Alaska Native	66	0.3%
Asian	1,776	8.7%
Native Hawaiian and Other Pacific Islander	17	0.1%
Some other race	732	3.6%
Two or more races	2,167	10.7%
Hispanic or Latino (of any race)	2,319	11.4%

=== 2023 ACS 5-year estimates ===
In 2023, the US Census Bureau estimated that 17.4% of the population were foreign-born. Of all people aged 5 or older, 79.9% spoke only English at home, 7.6% spoke Spanish, 4.6% spoke other Indo-European languages, 5.1% spoke Asian or Pacific Islander languages, and 2.8% spoke other languages. Of those aged 25 or older, 96.7% were high school graduates and 66.5% had a bachelor's degree.

The median household income in 2023 was $171,944, and the per capita income was $78,264. About 4.0% of families and 5.7% of the population were below the poverty line.

=== 2010 census ===
At the 2010 census, Agoura Hills had a population of 20,330. The population density was 2,599.0 inhabitants per square mile (1,003.5/km^{2}). The racial makeup of Agoura Hills was 17,147 (84.3%) White, (78.6% Non-Hispanic White), 267 (1.3%) African American, 51 (0.3%) Native American, 1,521 (7.5%) Asian, 24 (0.1%) Pacific Islander, 590 (2.9%) from other races, and 730 (3.6%) from two or more races. There were 1,936 Hispanic or Latino residents, of any race (9.5%).

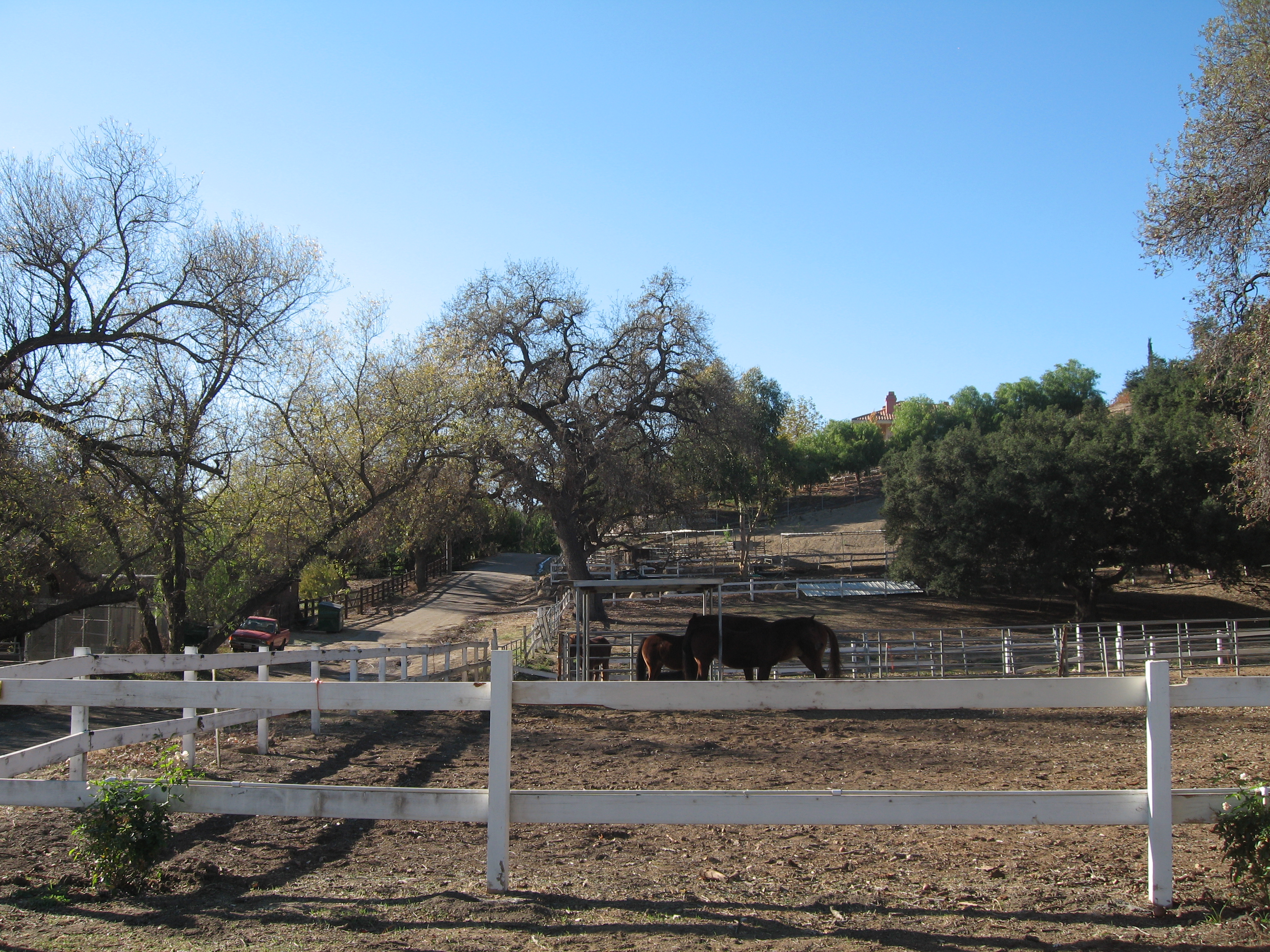
A ranch in Old Agoura

The census reported that 20,242 people (99.6% of the population) lived in households, 15 (0.1%) lived in non-institutionalized group quarters, and 73 (0.4%) were institutionalized.

There were 7,327 households, 2,799 (38.2%) had children under the age of 18 living in them, 4,565 (62.3%) were opposite-sex married couples living together, 726 (9.9%) had a female householder with no husband present, 302 (4.1%) had a male householder with no wife present. There were 263 (3.6%) unmarried opposite-sex partnerships, and 36 (0.5%) same-sex married couples or partnerships. 1,346 households (18.4%) were one person and 438 (6.0%) had someone living alone who was 65 or older. The average household size was 2.76. There were 5,593 families (76.3% of households); the average family size was 3.15.

The age distribution was 4,904 people (24.1%) under the age of 18, 1,582 people (7.8%) aged 18 to 24, 4,465 people (22.0%) aged 25 to 44, 7,089 people (34.9%) aged 45 to 64, and 2,290 people (11.3%) who were 65 or older. The median age was 42.4 years. For every 100 females, there were 97.2 males. For every 100 females age 18 and over, there were 94.6 males.

There were 7,585 housing units at an average density of 969.7 per square mile, of the occupied units 5,715 (78.0%) were owner-occupied and 1,612 (22.0%) were rented. The homeowner vacancy rate was 0.5%; the rental vacancy rate was 6.8%. 16,111 people (79.2% of the population) lived in owner-occupied housing units and 4,131 people (20.3%) lived in rental housing units. The median household income was $107,885, according to the 2010 United States Census, with 7.1% of the population living below the federal poverty line.

== Economy ==
=== Top employers ===
According to the city's 2025 Annual Comprehensive Financial Report, the top employers in the city are:

Rank	Employer	No. of Employees
1	Las Virgenes Unified School District	876
2	Visual Concepts Entertainment	655
3	Motor Vehicle Software Corp/VITU	534
4	VITU	506
5	Private National Mort Acc. Co. LLC	309
6	A2 Biotherapeutics, Inc.	262
7	Teradyne	210
8	Joni and Friends	200
9	Small Business Advertising, Inc.	200
10	Cydcor LLC	147

== Government ==
Agoura Hills is governed by a City Council/City Manager form of government. A five-member City Council is elected by the residents to oversee city operations and guide the development of the community. Councilmembers are elected to four-year terms. The terms are staggered so that a measure of continuity is maintained from one Council to the next. The role of Mayor rotates among the Councilmembers. The Mayor is chosen by the City Councilmembers to serve a one-year term. The City Manager is appointed by the City Council to supervise the administrative personnel and contract services.

As of December 2025 the Agoura Hills City Council consists of Jeremy Wolf (Mayor), Deborah Klein Lopez (Mayor Pro Tem), Chris Anstead, Kate Anderson, and Penny Sylvester. The City Manager is Nathan Hamburger and the city attorney is contracted through RWG Law.

As of 1990 the Las Virgenes Municipal Water District includes Agoura Hills.

=== State and federal representation ===
In the California State Legislature, Agoura Hills is in the 24th senatorial district, represented by Democrat Ben Allen, and in the 42nd Assembly district, represented by Democrat Jacqui Irwin.

In the United States House of Representatives, Agoura Hills is in California's 26th congressional district, represented by Democrat Julia Brownley.

=== County representation ===
The Board of Supervisors is the governing body of the County of Los Angeles, a charter county. Lindsay P. Horvath is the Supervisor for Los Angeles County's 3rd District where Agoura Hills is incorporated.

Los Angeles County Animal Care Services operates the Agoura Animal Care Center in Agoura Hills.

== Infrastructure ==
Las Virgenes Water District serves Agoura Hills along with Westlake Village and other parts of western Los Angeles County. State water provided by the Metropolitan Water District of Southern California is the sole source used by the district.

The Los Angeles County Sheriff's Department (LASD) operates the Malibu/Lost Hills Station in Calabasas, serving Agoura Hills.

The United States Postal Service Agoura Hills Post Office is located at 5158 Clareton Drive.

== Education ==
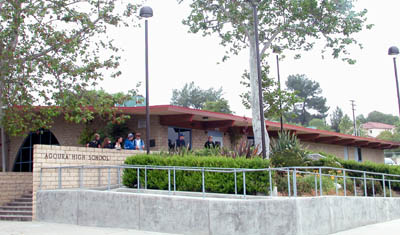
Agoura High School

The Las Virgenes Unified School District serves Agoura Hills.

- Sumac Elementary School
- Willow Elementary School
- Yerba Buena Elementary School
- Lindero Canyon Middle School
- Agoura High School
- Indian Hills High School

== Sports ==
Agoura Hills was the corporate headquarters of the Los Angeles Rams from 2016 to 2024 until they moved into Rams Village at Warner Center in Woodland Hills.

=== Events ===
Agoura Hills is home to the Great Race of Agoura Hills, an annual running event held at Chumash Park in Agoura Hills in March of every year. The Great Race was established in 1986 and features six races including Pacific Half (half-marathon), Chesebro Half (half-marathon), Old Agoura 10K, Deena Kastor (five kilometers), Kids One Mile, and the Family Fun Run (one mile). The Chesebro Half was voted best half-marathon in the U.S. in 2011.

== Notable people ==
- Justin Berfield, actor, producer, and writer known for Malcolm In The Middle
- Rob Bourdon (born 1979), musician
- Erin Brockovich (born 1960), environmental activist
- Kirk Cameron, actor
- Brooke Candy, artist and musician
- Paul Carroll, volleyball player and coach
- Rob Chiarelli, multiple Grammy Award winner
- Doja Cat, rapper, singer, songwriter
- Tara Davis-Woodhall (born 1999), Olympic athlete
- Joni Eareckson Tada, Christian ministry helping the disabled, writer, pa
- Guillermo del Toro, Mexican film director, lived in Agoura Hills for a few years.
- Jason Falkner, musician
- Foxygen, band
- Leo Gallagher, known professionally as Gallagher, comedian
- Chelsey Goldberg (born 1993), ice hockey player
- Ron Goldman (1968–1994), waiter and deceased friend of Nicole Brown Simpson
- Heather Graham, actress
- Skip Hicks, former UCLA running back and NFL and CFL football player
- Warren Hill, jazz musician
- Deena Kastor (born 1973), Olympic medalist/American marathon record holder
- Grant Kirkhope, composer
- Hayley Kiyoko, singer, songwriter, actress, and dancer
- Taylor Lautner, actor
- Linkin Park, rock band
  - Mike Shinoda, musician from the rock band Linkin Park
  - Brad Delson, musician from rock band Linkin Park
- Casey Matthews, NFL linebacker for the Philadelphia Eagles
- Clay Matthews, NFL linebacker for the Green Bay Packers
- Tamera Mowry, actress
- Tia Mowry, model and actress
- Harry Nilsson (1941–1994), singer-songwriter
- Terri Nunn, musician from new wave group Berlin, actress, radio host
- Rob Paulsen, voice actor
- Russell Peters (born 1970), comedian
- Alisan Porter, actress, & singer, winner of 10th season of The Voice
- Doug Robb, singer from post-grunge group Hoobastank
- Ray Romano (born 1957), comedian
- Jac Schaeffer (born 1978), screenwriter and producer
- David Shaughnessy, voice actor and TV director
- Hailee Steinfeld (born 1996), actress and singer
- Todd Steussie, NFL offensive lineman
- Robert Stock (born 1989), Major League Baseball pitcher
- London Thor, actress & singer-songwriter
- Elias Toufexis, film, television, and voice actor
- Jason Wade, singer and musician
- Rainn Wilson, film and television actor
- Matthew Wolff, professional golfer
- Mark L. Young (born 1988), actor
