= Botiller v. Dominguez =

1887 real estate case

- Supreme Court of the United States

Submitted January 7, 1887 Decided April 1, 1889
- Full case name: Brigido Botiller, et al. v. Dominga Dominguez
- Citations: 130 U.S. 238 (more) 9 S. Ct. 525; 32 L. Ed. 926

Case history
- Prior: Writ of error to the Supreme Court of the State of California

Holding
- No title to land in California dependent upon Spanish or Mexican land grants can be of any validity unless presented to and confirmed by the board of land commissioners within the time prescribed by Congress.

Court membership
- Chief Justice Melville Fuller Associate Justices Samuel F. Miller · Stephen J. Field; Joseph P. Bradley · John M. Harlan; Horace Gray · Samuel Blatchford; Lucius Q. C. Lamar II

Case opinion
- Majority: Miller, joined by unanimous

Botiller v. Dominguez, 130 U.S. 238 (1889), was a decision by the United States Supreme Court dealing with the validity of Spanish or Mexican land grants in the Mexican Cession, the region of the present day southwestern United States that was ceded to the U.S. by Mexico in 1848 under the Treaty of Guadalupe Hidalgo.

The action was in the nature of ejectment, brought in the Superior Court of the Los Angeles County by Dominga Dominguez against Brigido Botiller and others, to recover possession of a tract of land situated in said county, known as Rancho Las Virgenes. The title of the plaintiff was a grant claimed to have been made by the government of Mexico to Nemecio Dominguez and Domingo Carrillo, on October 1, 1834, but no claim under this grant had ever been presented for confirmation to the board of land commissioners, appointed under the California Land Act of 1851 (9 St. 631,) "to ascertain and settle the private land claims in the state of California", and no land patent had ever issued from the United States to any one for the land, or for any part of it.

The Court held that no title to land in California dependent upon Spanish or Mexican land grants can be of any validity unless presented to and confirmed by the board of land commissioners within the time prescribed by the United States Congress.

== See also ==
- List of United States Supreme Court cases, volume 130
- Alta California
- Treaty of Guadalupe Hidalgo
- Aboriginal title in California
