= Ballard Mountain =

Mountain in the Santa Monica Mountains

- Location within California Location within the United States

Highest point
- Elevation: 2,031 ft (619 m) NAVD 88
- Coordinates: 34°06′35″N 118°48′36″W

Geography
- Location: Los Angeles County, California, U.S.
- Parent range: Santa Monica Mountains

Ballard Mountain is a mountain in Los Angeles County, California in the Santa Monica Mountains with an elevation of 2,039 feet (621 m). Originally known as Niggerhead, all names containing that slur were replaced by the Board on Geographic Names to "Negro", making it known as Negrohead from 1964. In 2009, the name was changed to recognise the summit's association with John Ballard, an early black pioneer.

== John Ballard ==
John Ballard, a Black man from Kentucky, arrived in Los Angeles in 1859. He became a successful businessman, buying and selling real estate. He was active in civic affairs and in 1872 was one of the founding members of the First African Methodist Episcopal Church of Los Angeles. In 1880, Ballard picked up his family and moved about 50 miles (80 km) west to the Santa Monica Mountains. He purchased 160 acres (65 ha) of land, and the family raised some livestock and a few crops. Ballard collected firewood and sold it in the city.

He distinguished himself as an extraordinary individual who worked hard and persevered, despite attempts by others to drive him off his land. Despite his accomplishments, Ballard was mistreated by other pioneers due to the color of his skin. Thieves unsuccessfully tried to chase Ballard from his home. His cabin was set on fire twice, but he was not easily deterred. He rebuilt his home both times. Ballard died in 1905 when he was about 75 years old.

The Ballard homesteads included a 2,031-foot peak (619 m) that stands in the mountains just south of today’s cities of Thousand Oaks and Agoura Hills. Due to Ballard's presence on the land, the peak came to be known as “Niggerhead Mountain". It is unclear where or when this started, but the name appears on early maps of the area. In 2009, the name was changed to recognize the summit's association with Ballard.
