= Lake Lindero, Agoura Hills, California =

Artificial lake in the foothills of the Santa Monica Mountains, California

Lake Lindero
- Location within California
- Location: Agoura Hills, Los Angeles County, California, USA
- Coordinates: 34°08′55″N 118°47′23″W
- Type: Man-made lake
- Built: c. 1962

Lake Lindero is an artificial lake in the foothills of the Santa Monica Mountains, and the neighborhood around it within the city of Agoura Hills, in western Los Angeles County, California.

The small lake is primarily surrounded by private housing (120 homes on the lake). There are two commercial buildings on the southeast corner of the lake and a 9 hole public golf course named after the lake.

== History ==
The Lake Lindero property was previously owned by C. L. "Kelly" Johnson of Lockheed Martin (Vice President of the Advanced Products Division in Burbank, also known as the "Skunk Works") from the early 1940s to the early 1960s. When he and his wife Althea bought the property, it was called "Lindero Ranch". They ranched the property and had a home on the now cropped hill where present day Penrod Drive ends.

They sold the ranch in 1962, and "The developer initially built 746 homes on the ranch after we sold it. He dug a lake near the Ventura Freeway and called the new community Lake Lindero." The suburban Lake Lindero housing tract was built during the late 1960s and early 1970s amid a housing construction boom in the area.

== Description ==
The neighborhood is relatively quiet and middle-class, with a working class contingent.

The neighborhood contains the Lindero Country Club, 9-hole public Lake Lindero Golf Course, Lindero Canyon Middle School, and Yerba Buena Elementary School.

The district's synagogue has become a major center of Jewish culture in the area, and every Shabbat local Orthodox Jews can be seen walking to and from the synagogue along major roads throughout Agoura Hills.

The Reyes Adobe museum is located in the eastern part of the Lake Lindero district. The historic Reyes Adobe Museum (c. 1820), from the Rancho Las Virgenes, is owned by the Los Angeles County Parks and Recreation Department, was built in the mid-2000s around the site of the old adobe. Today, it is a popular tourist attraction.

== See also ==
- Agoura Hills, California
