= Ysidro Reyes =

Californio (1813–1863)

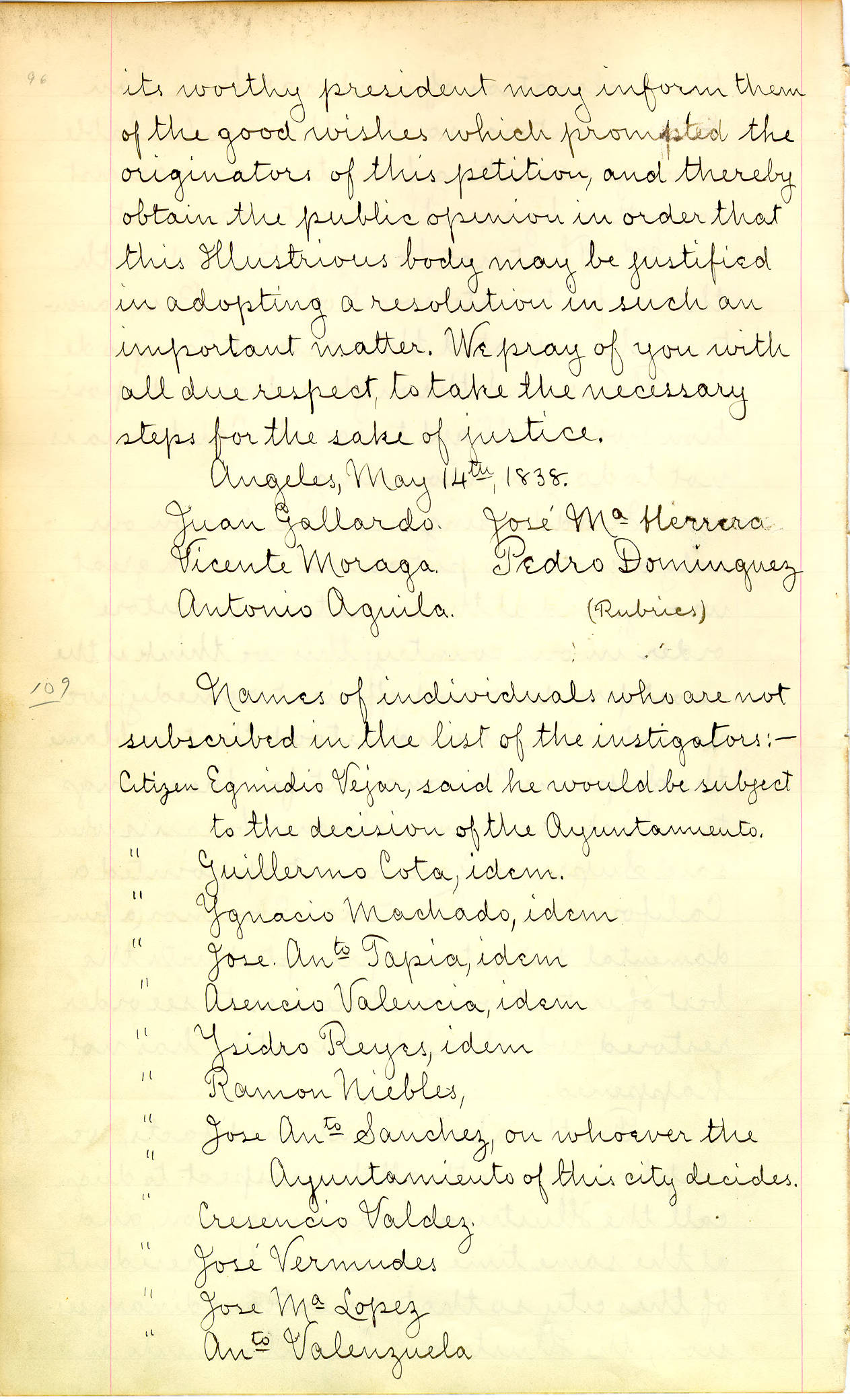
Transcript of an 1838 City record counting Ysidro Reyes as opposed to the removal of an official

Ysidro Reyes (1813–1863) was a Los Angeles–based business man and grandson of Juan Francisco Reyes, the first alcalde (mayor) of the Los Angeles pueblo.

== Life ==
Reyes acquired half of a Mexican Land Grant called the Rancho Boca de Santa Monica, splitting with Francisco Marquez many acres of land located in present-day Santa Monica Canyon, the Pacific Palisades, and parts of Topanga Canyon. Ysidro's father, Juan Francisco Reyes, was a settler from modern day Mexico (then New Spain) who arrived in Los Angeles shortly after the original settlers of 1781. Juan Francisco Reyes was a soldier and businessman, receiving and selling land-grants from the Spanish Crown including Rancho Los Encinos and Lompoc.

Ysidro Reyes lived on the Rancho Boca de Santa Monica, in the Santa Monica Canyon, working a large tract of land with his father that extended to what is now Hollywood. Additionally, Ysidro Reyes had a business selling tar from the La Brea Tar Pits to the people of Los Angeles, who used it for their roofs.

=== Ysidro Reyes Adobe ===
The Ysidro Reyes Adobe was the first adobe home ever built in Santa Monica Canyon, erected in the year 1838 on land now known as Pampas Ricas Blvd, located in Pacific Palisades, Los Angeles. Sketches of adobe dwelling exist in the collection of the UCLA Library. A memorial plaque sits in a boulder on Pampas Ricas Blvd. commemorating the adobe house, dedicated in the 1950s.

== Death ==
Ysidro Reyes died in 1863. Reyes left his portion of Rancho Boca de Santa Monica to his widow, Maria Antonia Villa, who sold it to developer and railroad magnate Robert Symington Baker in 1875. Baker developed his portion of Rancho Boca de Santa Monica into the City of Santa Monica.
