= Juan Francisco Reyes (soldier) =

Spanish-era Los Angeles public official and ranchero

Juan Francisco Reyes (1749–1809), soldado de cuera ("leather-jacketed soldier") on the 1769 Portola expedition, alcalde (municipal magistrate) of the Pueblo de Los Angeles for three terms, and recipient of the Spanish land grant for Rancho Los Encinos and later Lompoc.

== Juan Francisco Reyes ==
In 1769 Francisco Reyes, left his home in modern day Mexico (then New Spain) to join the Spanish army and to accompany Fr. Junípero Serra on his journey to establish the California missions. Francisco Reyes served at Monterey and San Luis Obispo and was stationed at Mission San Antonio de Padua during its construction.

In 1784, Francisco Reyes received the Spanish land grant, Rancho Los Encinos, which comprised what is now the San Fernando Valley in Los Angeles, California. He used the land for cattle ranching. In 1795, however, the Spanish mission founders decided that Rancho Los Encinos would be a favorable location for the Mission San Fernando. Reyes returned Rancho Los Encinos to the Mission. He requested a new land grant and received land in central California in 1802, between Mission San Luis Obispo and Mission La Purísima Concepción. Reyes did not reside there. Reyes maintained an adobe house in the Pueblo de Los Angeles. Reyes became alcalde of the Pueblo of Los Angeles in 1790, and 1793–1795.

Francisco Reyes married María del Carmen Domínguez and some of their eleven children include Antonio Reyes, Juana Reyes and José Jacinto Reyes. Francisco Reyes's brother-in-law, José María Domínguez, was the grantee of Rancho Las Virgenes. In 1845, José María Domínguez sold Rancho Las Virgenes to María Antonia Machado de Reyes.

== Antonio Faustino Reyes ==
Antonio Faustino Reyes (1785–1844) eldest son of Juan Francisco Reyes, married Maria Clara Cota on July 31, 1816, at Mission San Gabriel. He served as a part of the L.A militia and at the Presidio in San Diego. They had 6 children.

=== Antonio Maria Reyes ===
Antonio Maria Reyes (1822–1928) son of Antonio Faustino Reyes, married Maria Trinidad Jesus Francisca Vejar on January 18, 1852, in San Gabriel, California. They had 7 children. Maria was the daughter of Nepomuceno Ricardo Vejar (1805 - 1882). Ricardo Vejar served as Juez de Campo (Country Judge) in Los Angeles in 1833. Vejar owned a one third share of Rancho San Jose and was also the owner of Rancho Los Nogales. Antonio died at the age of 105 in Orange, California.

== José Jacinto Reyes ==
José Jacinto Reyes (1788–1837), son of Juan Francisco Reyes, married María Antonia Francisca Valentina Machado (1792 - 1863) in 1808 and they had fourteen children before his early death. Both José's father, Juan Francisco Reyes, and María's father, José Manuel Machado, were soldados de cuero on the Portola expedition.

=== Ysidro Reyes ===
José Ysidro Reyes (1813 - 1861), son of José Jacinto Reyes and María Antonia Machado, married María Antonia Villa. Ysidro Reyes lived in Los Angeles and owned one of the largest vineyards in the area. He also had a business transporting brea (tar) from the tar pits at Rancho La Brea to homes in Los Angeles. In 1839 Reyes, along with his friend Francisco Márquez, jointly received the Mexican land grant Rancho Boca de Santa Monica.

=== José Paulino Reyes ===
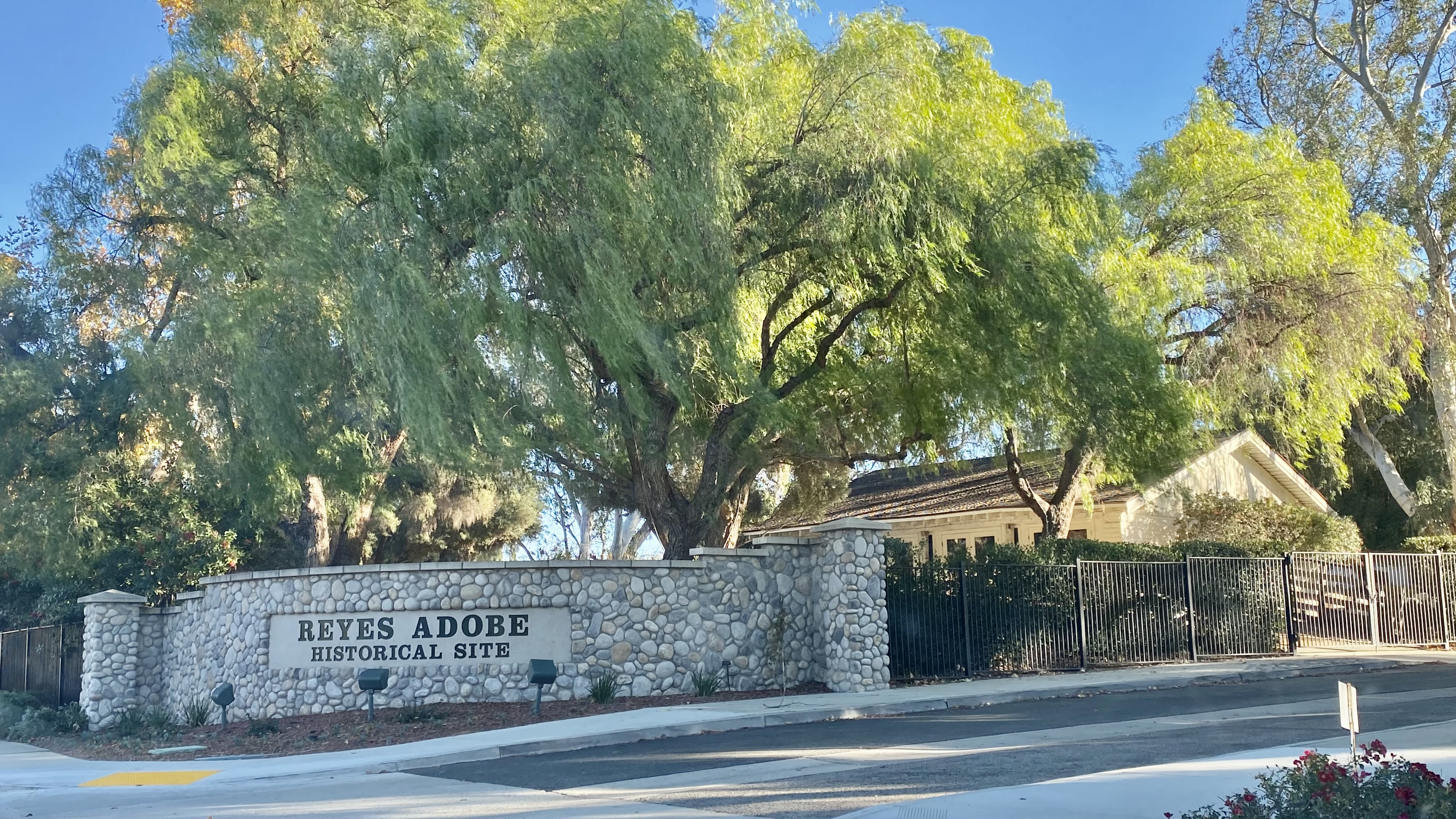
Located at 5464 Reyes Adobe Road, Agoura Hills, opposite Reyes Adobe Park

José Paulino Reyes (1824 - ), son of José Jacinto Reyes and María Antonia Machado, built an adobe home on Rancho Las Virgenes in about 1850.
