= Rancho Las Vírgenes =

Historic land grant in Southern California, United States

Coordinates: 34.150°N 118.800°W

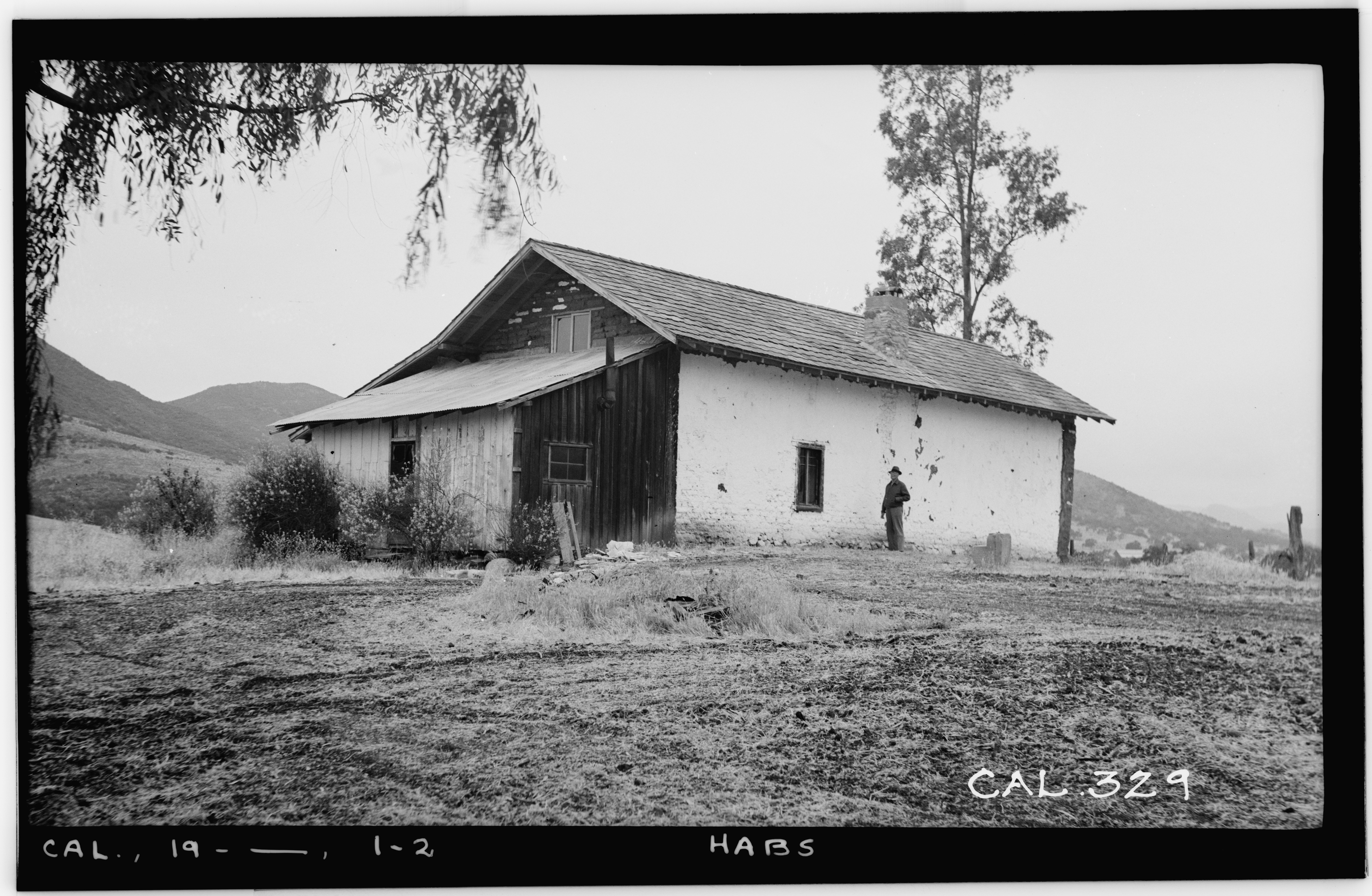
Reyes Adobe and the Simi Hills, on Rancho Las Vírgenes, in a 1936 HABS—Historic American Buildings Survey image.

Rancho Las Vírgenes was a 17,760-acre (71.9 km^{2}) land grant in the Santa Monica Mountains and Simi Hills, in present day western Los Angeles County, California. The lands of the Rancho Las Vírgenes included present day Agoura Hills, Oak Park, and Westlake Village and part of the Santa Monica Mountains.

It was given in 1802 by Spanish Governor José Joaquín de Arrillaga to Miguel Ortega, but was abandoned after his death in 1809. Nemecio Domínguez and Domingo Carrillo received a Mexican land grant in 1834. Nuestra Señora la Reina de las Vírgenes translates as "Our Lady the Queen of the Virgins".

== History ==
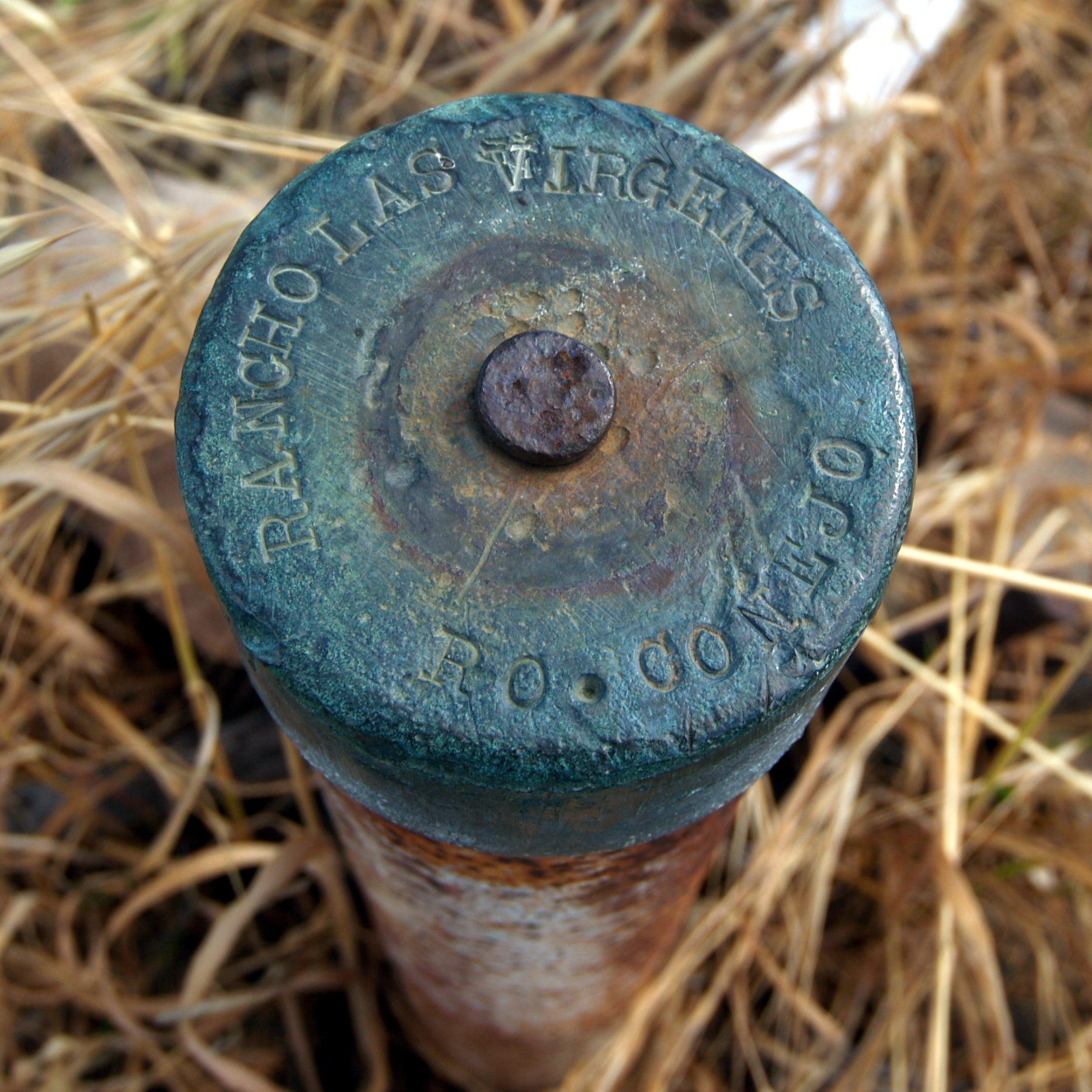
A Rancho Las Vírgenes and Rancho El Conejo engraved boundary marker.

The Tongva (Native American) village in this area was called Wisyáxnga, which means "place of the pine" in the Fernandeño language, a dialect of the Tongva language. Bartholomé Miguel de Ortega (1751–1809) received a provisional Spanish grant in 1800 from Governor José Joaquín de Arrillaga for Rancho Santa Gertrudis de las Vírgenes / Rancho Nuestra Señora la Reina of las Vírgenes, or simply referred to as Rancho Las Vírgenes. After the death of Miguel Ortega in 1809, the Ortega family returned to Pueblo de Los Ángeles. By 1817 the rancho was widely acknowledged to be abandoned, and since the original grant was only provisional, the land was considered legally vacant according to Spanish precedent, and the Franciscans at Mission San Fernando Rey de España petitioned Governor Solá to cede them the land to use as pasturage for their cattle.

In 1833, Nemesio Domínguez of Los Ángeles and Domingo Antonio Ygnacio Carrillo of Santa Barbara, submitted a petition to Governor Figueroa for a tract of land twelve leagues west of Los Angeles, known as Las Vírgenes. They argued that the land was not needed by the mission, and that it had been legally vacant since Miguel Ortega's death. In 1834, they were granted Rancho Las Vírgenes.

In 1837, Governor Alvarado granted the Triunfo addition to the Las Virgenes grant to Nemecio's father, José Maria Dominguez, and a new survey, or diseño, was drawn.

In 1845, Maria Antonia Machado de Reyes (1792–1863) purchased the Rancho Las Virgenes from her uncle Jose Maria Dominguez. Maria Antonia Machado de Reyes was a widow with 14 children. Maria Machado’s husband, José Jacinto Reyes (1788–1837), was the son of Juan Francisco Reyes.

With the cession of California to the United States following the Mexican-American War, the 1848 Treaty of Guadalupe Hidalgo provided that the land grants would be honored. As required by the Land Act of 1851, the heirs of Domingo Carrillo filed a claim for Rancho Las Virgenes with the Public Land Commission in 1853 for an undivided half share of the 1834 grant, but the claim was rejected in 1854.

Maria Antonia Machado de Reyes filed a claim with the Land Commission in 1852. The commission confirmed her claim in 1854, and the U.S. District Court for Southern California approved this decision in 1857. An appeal was dismissed in 1858, and the claim patented at 8,885 acres (36 km^{2}) in 1883.

Although still sizeable, the total area was considerably less than the original land grant. The apparent reason for the change was due to a misinterpretation of the 1837 diseño which José Dominguez had drawn. As a result of this error, the United States considered the excluded land to be part of the public domain and allowed private claimants to settle. This surplus land was surveyed and opened to homesteading in 1896. Many settlers may have already moved into the area by that time, in anticipation of the courts' decision, but their claims could not be documented formally until they filed for patent after 1896.

José Maria Dominguez transferred title to his son, Jose Apolonio Dominguez (1816–), who left it his daughter Dominga Dominguez. Dominga Dominguez sued homesteader Brigido Botiller and others, to recover possession of Rancho Las Virgenes. In Botiller v. Dominguez, the US Supreme Court agreed that the grant was "perfect" (i.e. had been properly granted by the government of Mexico to Nemecio Dominguez and Domingo Carrillo in 1834), however as no claim for the grant had made to the Land Commission, no patent could be issued.

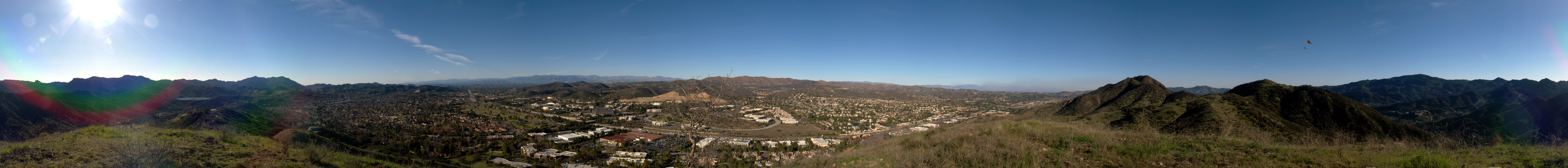
Contemporary panorama of the former Rancho Las Virgenes. (Center of image is North.)

== Historic sites of the Rancho ==
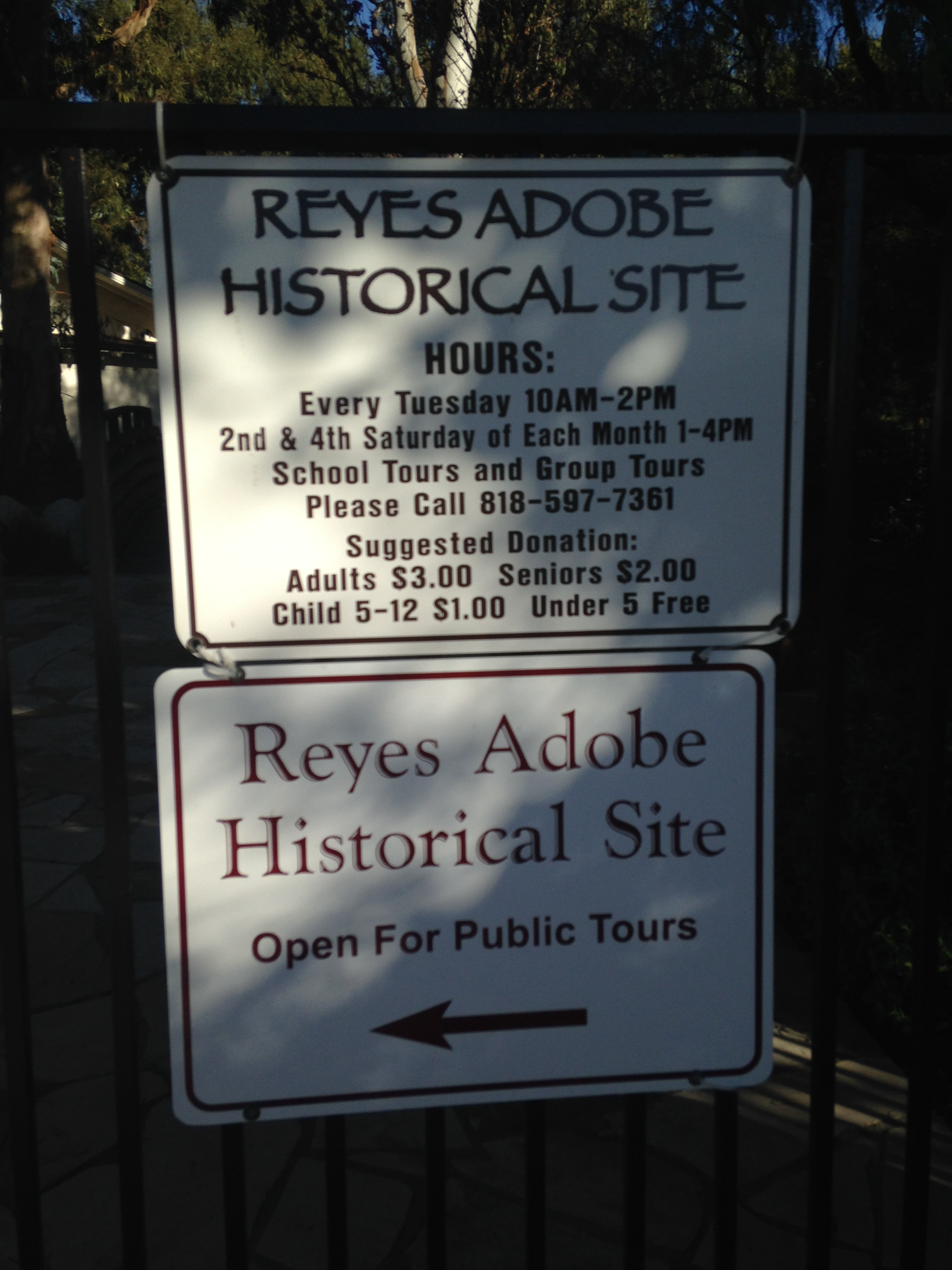

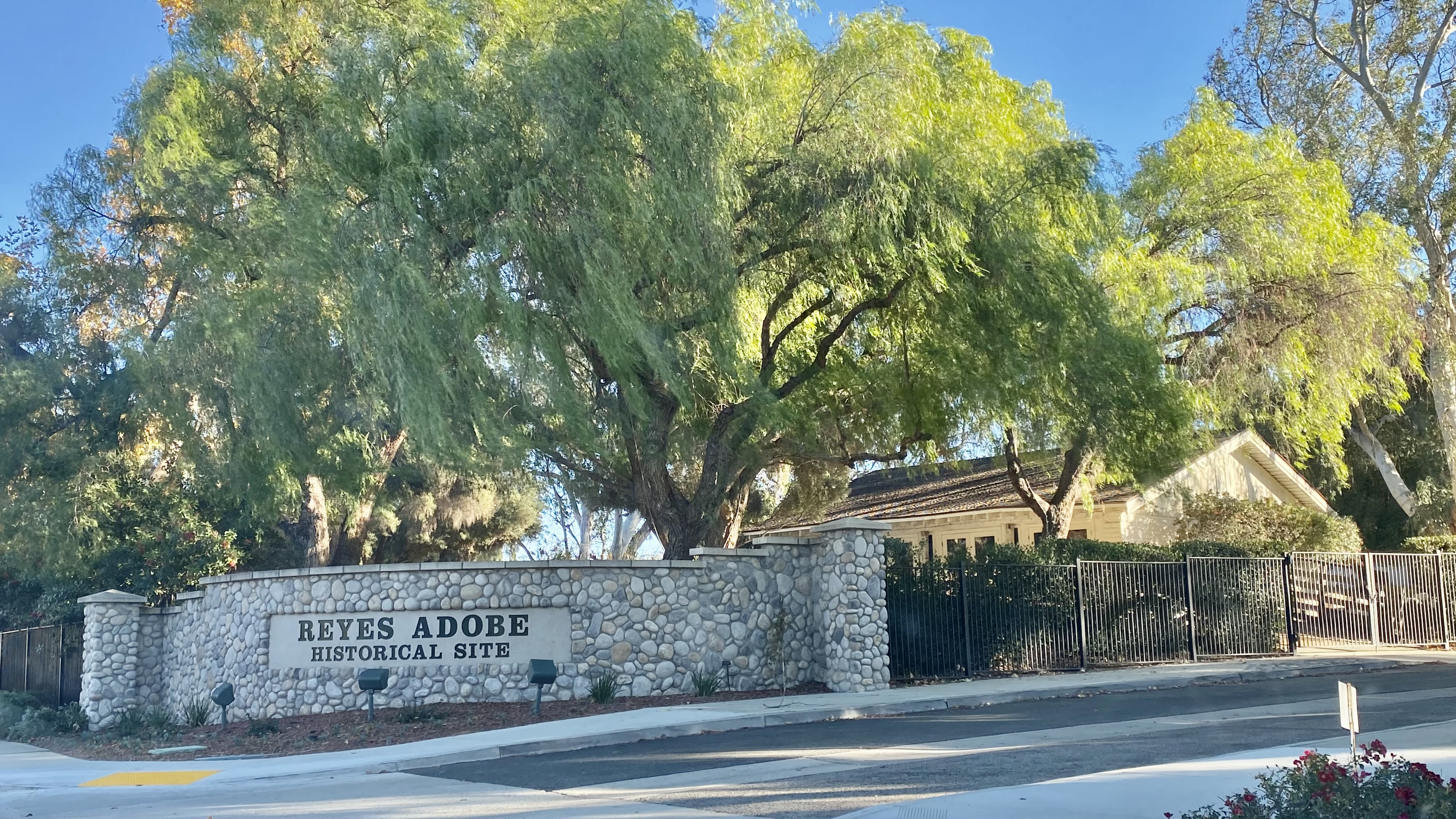
Located at 5464 Reyes Adobe Road, Agoura Hills, opposite Reyes Adobe Park

- Reyes Adobe. Jose Paulino Reyes, the son of Jose Jacinto Reyes and Maria Antonia Machado, built the adobe home in about 1850, which was owned by the Los Angeles County Parks and Recreation Department before transfer to the City of Agoura Hills.
- Vejar Adobe. The two-story Monterey-type adobe near Strawberry Hill was built in about 1850 by Juan Crisostomo Vejar (1815–1877), who married Maria Engracia Reyes (daughter of Maria Antonia Machado de Reyes). It was a stop along the Butterfield Overland Stage route in the 1860s and became known as Vejar Station. The building stood at Roadside Drive and Cornell Road, Agoura until the early 1900s, when it was razed.
