= 1991 in architecture =

The year 1991 in architecture involved some significant architectural events and new buildings.

== Buildings and structures ==
=== Buildings ===
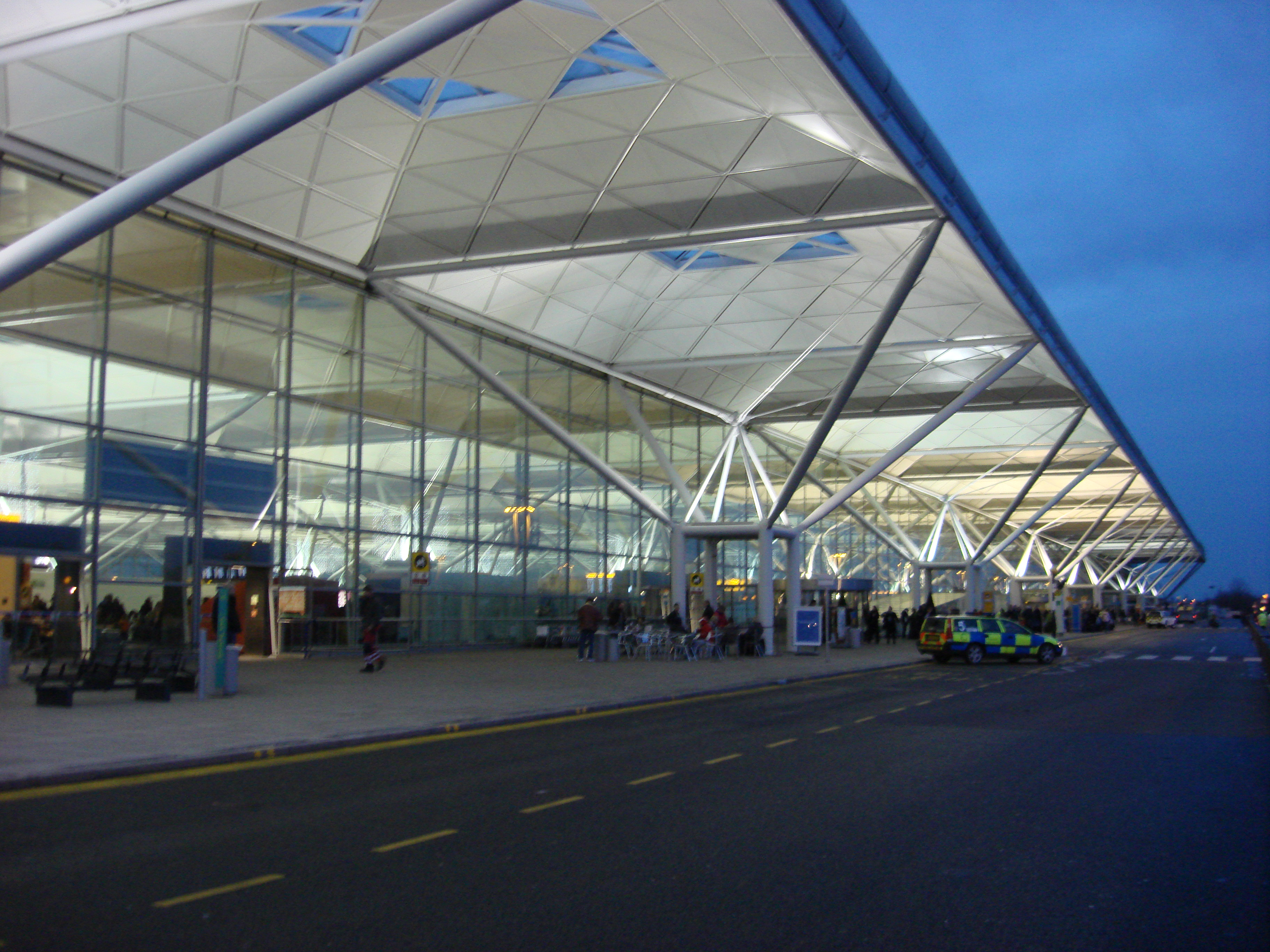
London Stansted Airport

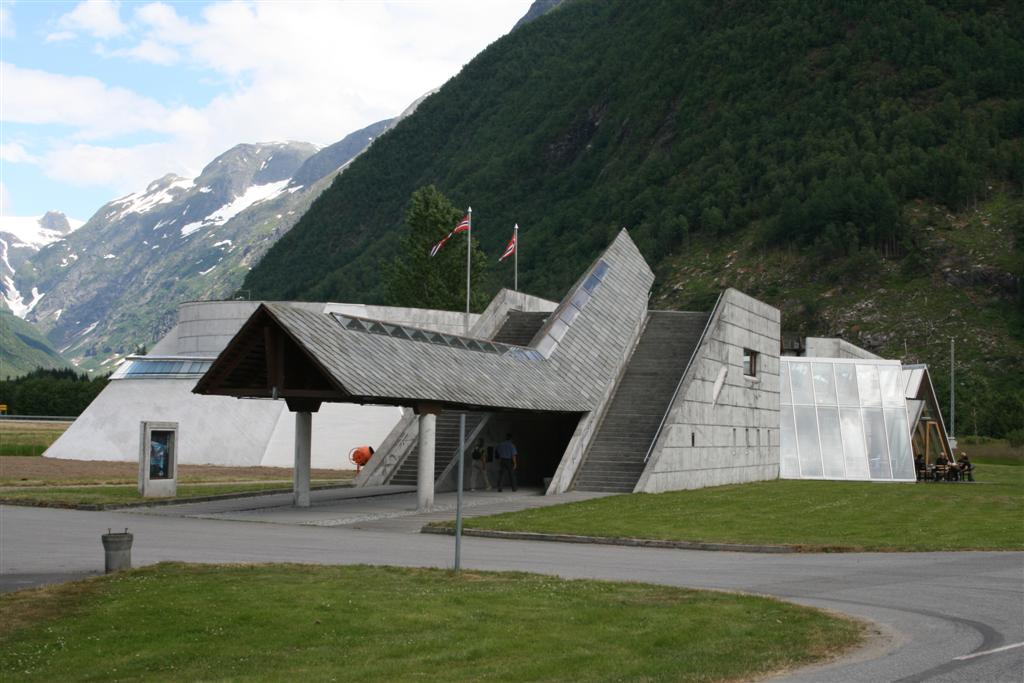
Norwegian Glacier Museum in Fjærland, Norway

- One Canada Square at Canary Wharf in London, designed by César Pelli & Associates, becomes the tallest building in the United Kingdom.
- Stansted Airport terminal building in Essex, England, designed by Norman Foster.
- Rebuilt Liverpool Street station in London, designed by Nick Derbyshire, is opened.
- The Tianjin Radio and Television Tower in Tianjin, China is completed.
- The Sainsbury Wing of the National Gallery in London, designed by Robert Venturi and Denise Scott Brown, is opened.
- Norwegian Glacier Museum in Fjærland, designed by Sverre Fehn, is built.
- Extended Brentwood Cathedral in England, designed by Quinlan Terry, is dedicated.
- University of Vaasa Palosaari stage 1 buildings, Finland, designed by Käpy and Simo Paavilainen.
- Key Tower in Cleveland, Ohio, United States is completed.
- The Messeturm in Frankfurt am Main, Germany is completed.
- QV1 in Perth, Australia.
- TD Canada Trust Tower, Calgary in Calgary, Alberta
- Carnegie Hall Tower in Manhattan, New York, United States is completed.
- Bell Atlantic Tower in Philadelphia, Pennsylvania, United States is completed.
- Bourke Place in Melbourne, Australia is completed.
- Melbourne Central Shopping Centre in Melbourne, Australia is completed.
- The Friedrich Clemens Gerke Tower in Cuxhaven, Lower Saxony, Germany is completed.
- The Guangzhou TV Tower in Guangzhou, China is completed.
- The West Tower of the Stardust Resort & Casino in Las Vegas, Nevada, United States is completed.
- 101 Collins Street designed by architects Denton Corker Marshall is completed in Melbourne.
- "The Corns" residential towers, "1000 Years" housing estate, Katowice, Poland, designed by Henryk Buszko and Aleksander Franta, is completed.
- Team Disney Orlando, an office building in Lake Buena Vista, Florida, designed by Arata Isozaki.
- The Keeler House in Pacific Palisades, Los Angeles, designed by Ray Kappe. It was destroyed in the January 2025 Southern California wildfires.

== Awards ==
- AIA Gold Medal – Benjamin C. Thompson.
- Architecture Firm Award – Zimmer Gunsul Frasca Architects.
- Grand Prix de l'urbanisme – Jean Dellus.
- Grand prix national de l'architecture – Christian Hauvette.
- Praemium Imperiale Architecture Laureate – Gae Aulenti.
- Pritzker Prize – Robert Venturi.
- Prix de l'Académie d'Architecture de France – Norman Foster.
- RAIA Gold Medal – Donald Bailey.
- RIBA Royal Gold Medal – Colin Stansfield Smith.
- Twenty-five Year Award – Sea Ranch Condominium One

== Deaths ==
- August 19 – Hans van der Laan, Dutch monk and architect (born 1904)
