= Vittorio's =

Italian restaurant in Lost Angeles, California

Coordinates: 34.0479°N 118.5446°W

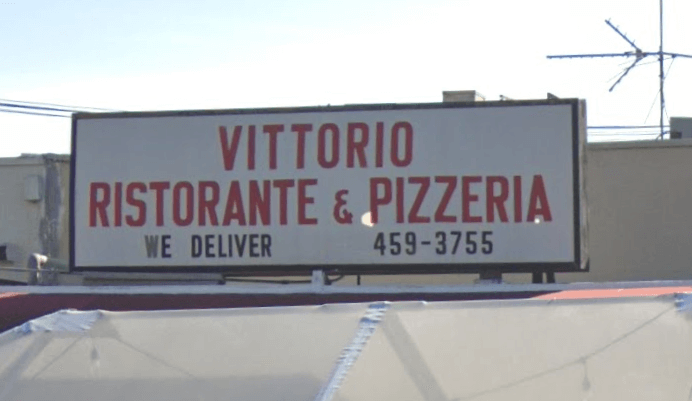
- Interactive map of Vittorio's

Restaurant information
- Established: 1984
- Closed: 2025
- Owner: Mercedes Pellegrini Vanessa Pellegrini Sabrina Pellegrini
- Previous owner: Giovanni Mazzola

Vittorio's was an Italian restaurant in the Pacific Palisades.

== History ==
Vittorio's was established in 1984 by Mercedes Pellegrini and her husband who were encouraged by the success of their nearby Continental Delights bakery. In December 2020, Vittorio's hosted a toy drive for 200 foster children. A year later, the COVID-19 pandemic forced the restaurant to close. In 2024, Vittorio's celebrated its 40-year anniversary by hosting a throwback event in which the food was sold for the same price as that of its founding year.

The restaurant was destroyed in the Palisades Fire, but its owners look intend to rebuild it in the aftermath.

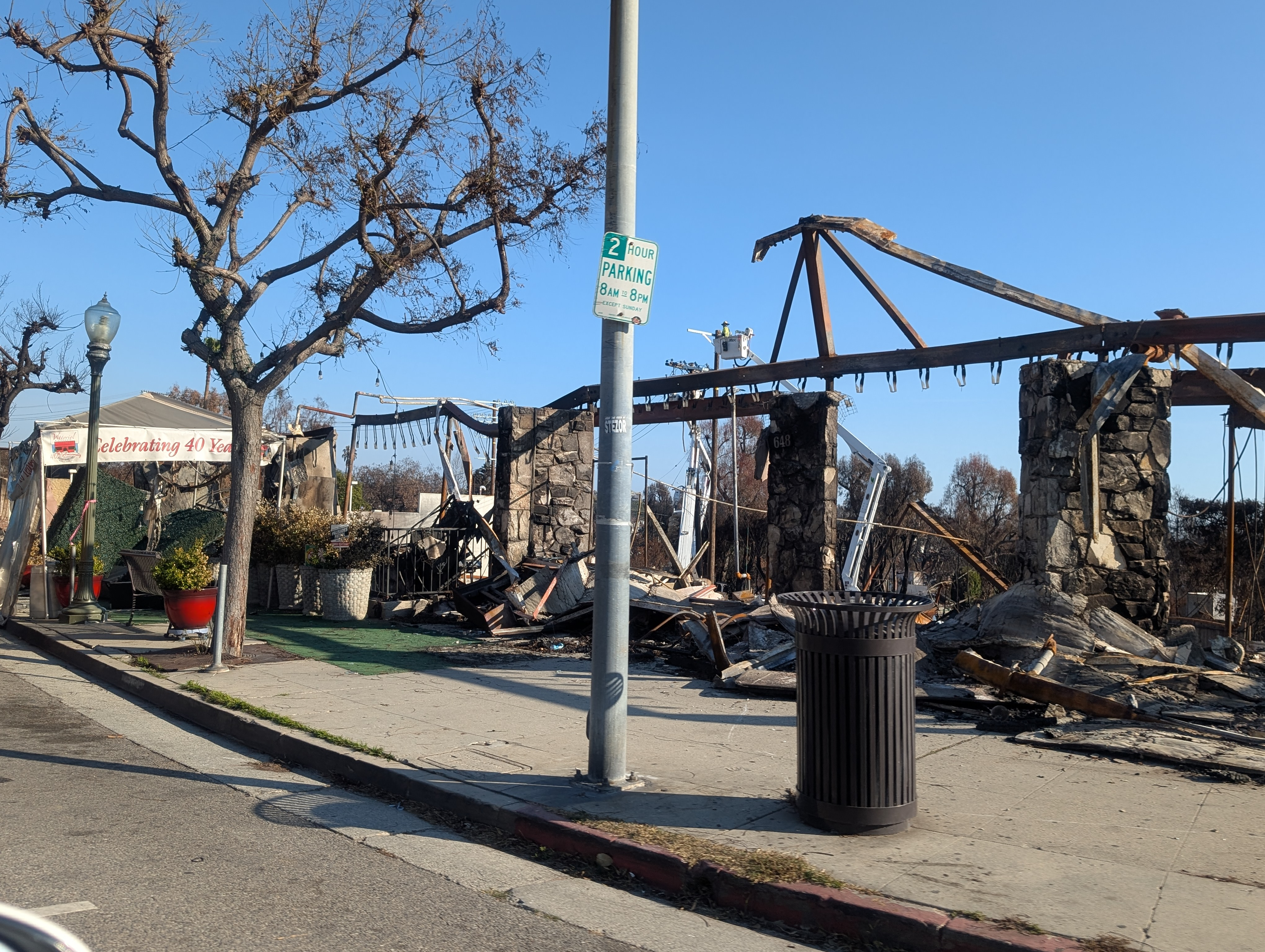
Exterior photo of the remnants of the Vittorio's Italian restaurant in Pacific Palisades. The building burned down during the Palisades Fire in January 2025.
