= San Vicente Mountain Park =

Former missile control station in the Santa Monica Mountains

Coordinates: 34.129°N 118.513°W

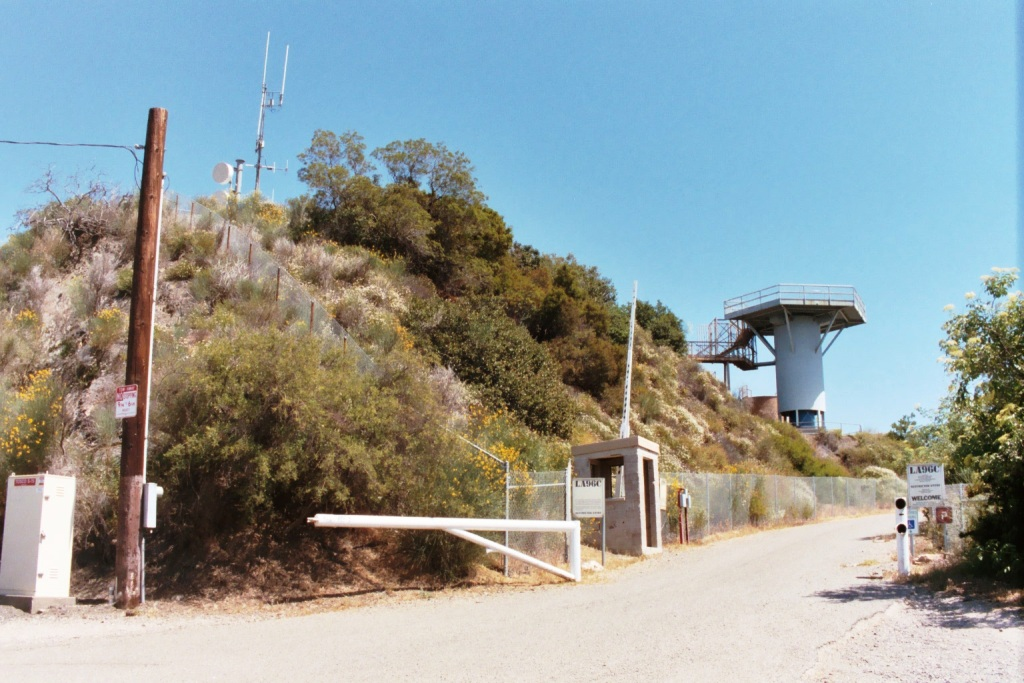
The entrance to the observation station

San Vicente Mountain Park is a former Nike Missile Radar/Control Site in Southern California. The site is located on land owned by the city of Los Angeles above the Encino Reservoir along the unpaved portion of Mulholland Drive west of the 405 freeway.

It is located in the Santa Monica Mountains National Recreation Area.

== See also ==
- List of Nike missile sites
