= Pacific Palisades Bowl Mobile Estates =

Neighborhood of Los Angeles, California, United States

- Neighborhood of Los Angeles
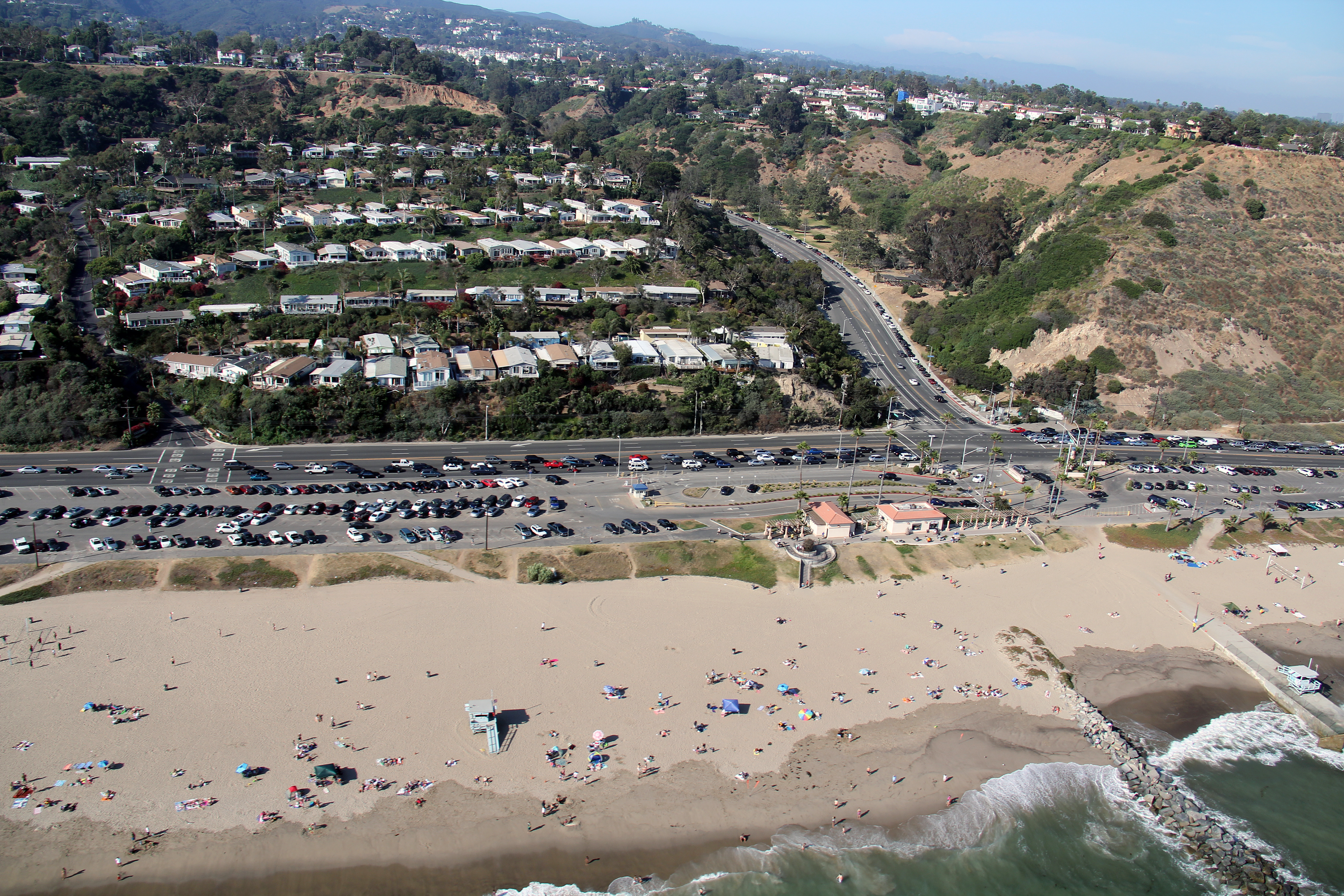
- Pacific Palisades Bowl Mobile Estates next to Temescal Canyon, Los Angeles
- Interactive map of Pacific Palisades Bowl Mobile Estates
- Coordinates: 34°02′18″N 118°32′18″W
- Country: United States
- State: California
- County: Los Angeles
- City: Los Angeles
- Time zone: UTC−8 (PST)
  - Summer (DST): UTC−7 (PDT)
- ZIP Code: 90272
- Area code: 310

The Pacific Palisades Bowl Mobile Estates was a community of 172 manufactured and mobile homes in the Pacific Palisades neighborhood of Los Angeles, California. It featured recreational facilities and a pool, and was one of the only affordable housing options in the Pacific Palisades. The community was destroyed in the Palisades Fire of January 2025.

== History ==
The Pacific Palisades Bowl Mobile Estates community was first established as a Methodist camp in 1890s. It was developed as a mobile home community in the 1950s. The neighborhood is located just north of Temescal Canyon and east of Pacific Coast Highway.

=== Lawsuit ===
In 2005, landslides damaged three homes. Park residents sued the owner of The Pacific Palisades Bowl Mobile Estates, Edward Biggs, as well as the former owner. Plaintiffs alleged that Biggs did not properly maintain the hill above the park, where the landslides occurred.

While the lawsuit was pending, Biggs sent a 60-day notice terminating the tenancy of the plaintiffs. In 2013, Biggs created plans to turn the residencies into a luxury development, which would involve replacing older homes and removing residents. He testified that he misrepresented to residents in attempts to get them to remove their homes. In 2018, Edward Biggs was found liable for $8.9 million in fraud charges.

=== Palisades Fire ===
In January 2025, all of the nearly 200 homes in the Palisades Bowl were destroyed by the Palisades Fire. Former Palisades resident Jonathan Rinderknecht was charged for setting the destructive fire.

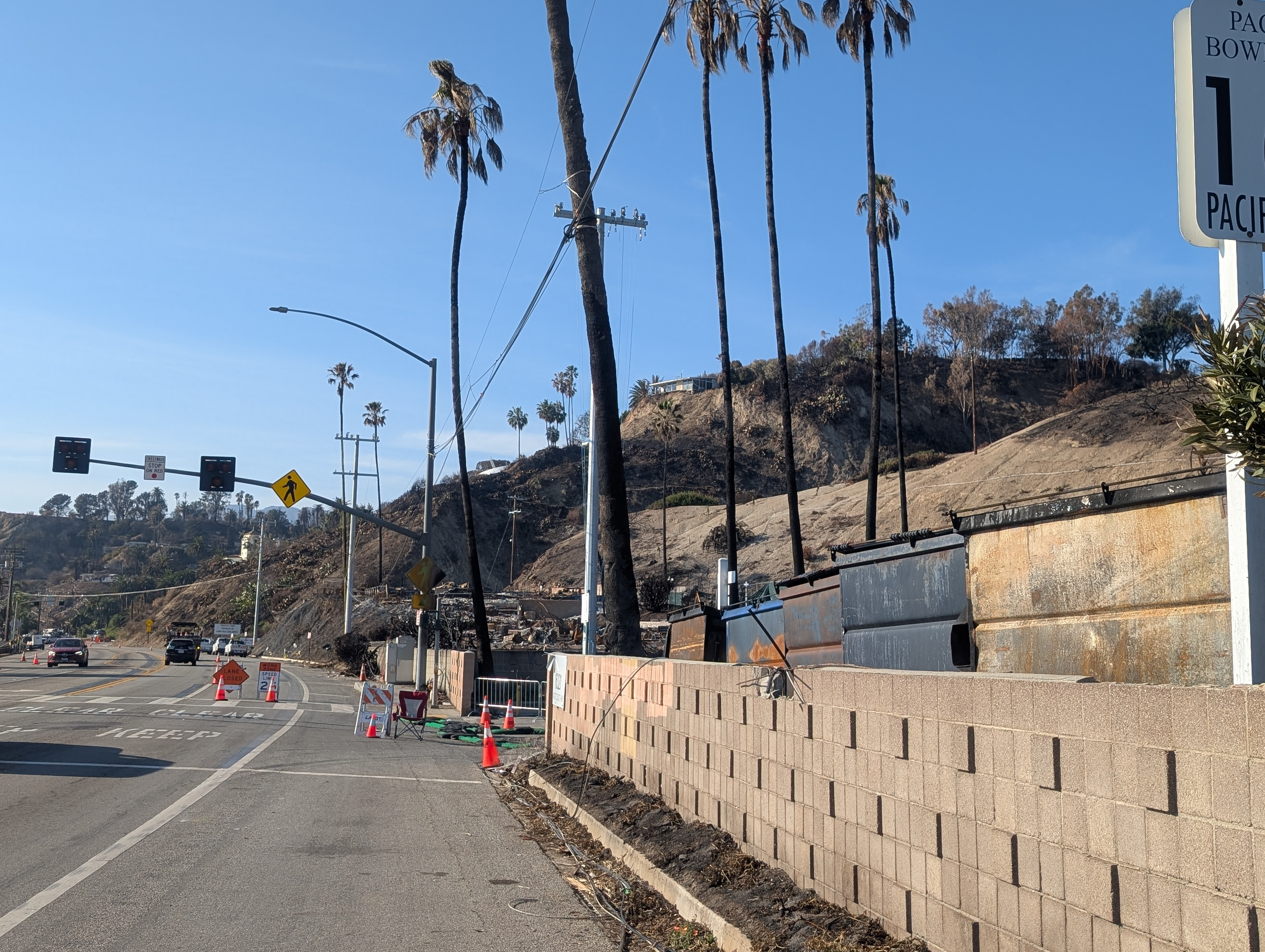
The Pacific Palisades Bowl Mobile Estates entrance after the Palisades Fire
