= Sunset Boulevard =

Road in Los Angeles County, California

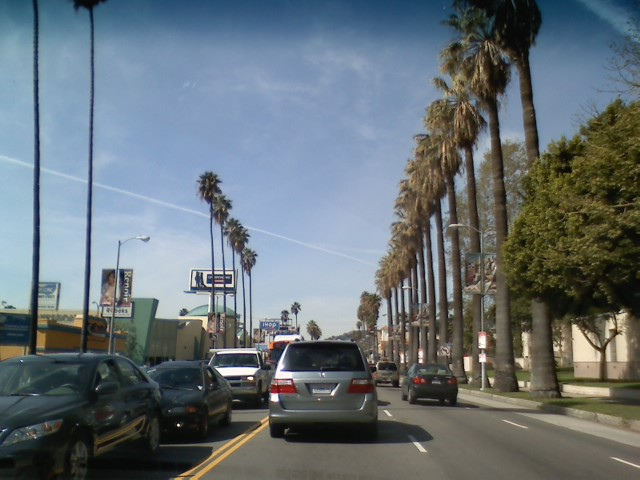
- Sunset Boulevard near Vine Street in Hollywood
- Location: Los Angeles County
- Nearest metro station: Vermont/Sunset
- West end: SR 1 in Pacific Palisades
- Major junctions: I-405 in Brentwood; US 101 in Hollywood; SR 2 in Echo Park
- East end: Figueroa Street in Downtown

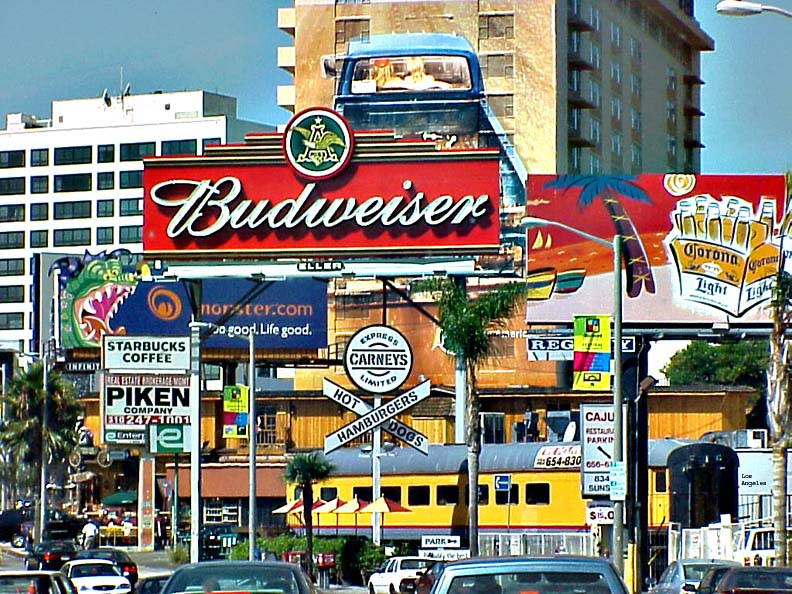
Signs along the Sunset Strip

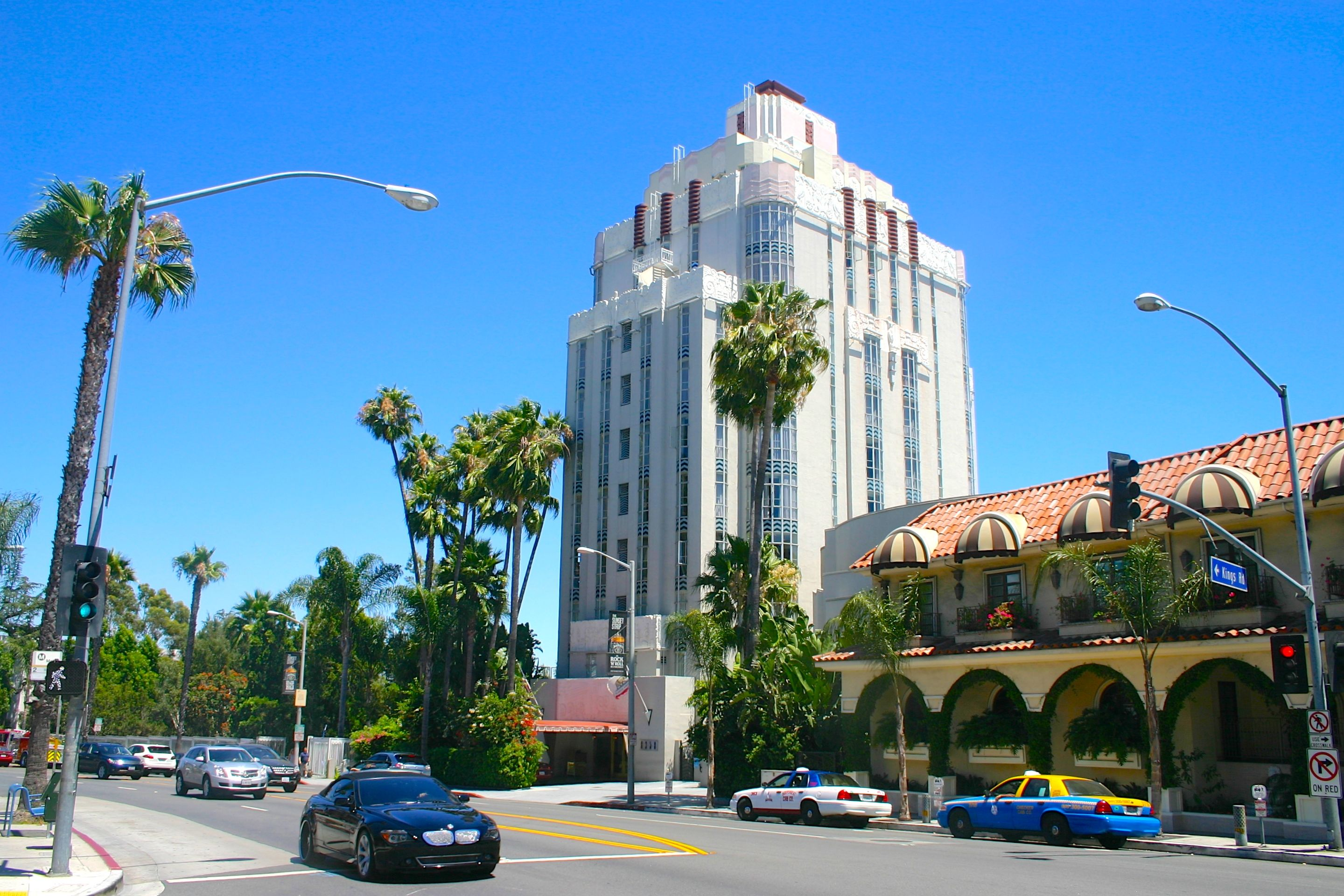
The Sunset Tower on Sunset Boulevard

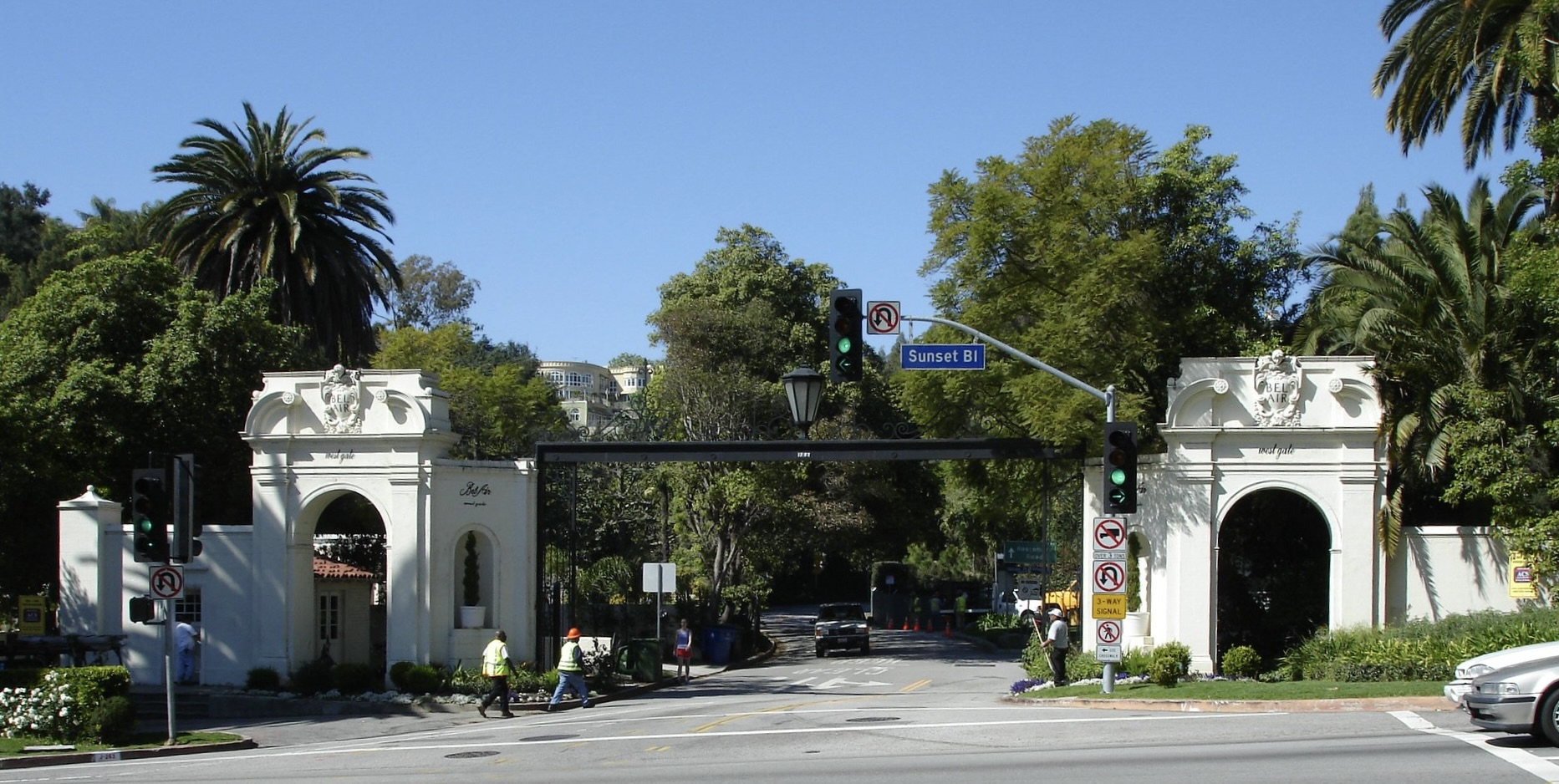
Sunset Blvd at the West Gate of Bel Air

Sunset Boulevard is a boulevard in the central and western part of Los Angeles, California, United States. Stretching from Figueroa Street in downtown Los Angeles to the Pacific Coast Highway in Pacific Palisades, it is a major thoroughfare in the cities of West Hollywood and Beverly Hills, as well as several districts in Los Angeles itself.

== Geography ==
Approximately 23.6 miles (38 km) long, the boulevard roughly traces the arc of mountains that form part of the northern boundary of the Los Angeles Basin. It follows the path of a 1780s cattle trail from the Pueblo de Los Ángeles to the ocean.

From Downtown Los Angeles, the boulevard heads northwest, to Hollywood, through which it travels due west for several miles before it bends southwest towards the ocean. It passes through or near Echo Park, Silver Lake, Los Feliz, Hollywood, West Hollywood, Beverly Hills, and Holmby Hills. In West Hollywood, where it is informally known as the Sunset Strip, it is roughly coincident with the western part of the Hollywood fault. In Bel Air, it runs along the northern boundary of UCLA's Westwood campus.

Continuing through Brentwood to Pacific Palisades, the boulevard terminates at its intersection with the Pacific Coast Highway. It has curvaceous winding stretches and can be treacherous for unalert drivers in some sections. Along its entire route, it is at least four lanes wide. It is frequently congested with traffic loads beyond its design capacity.

Sunset Boulevard historically extended farther east than it does now, starting at Alameda Street near Union Station and beside Olvera Street in the historic section of Downtown. In 1994, along with Macy Street and Brooklyn Avenue, its portion east of Figueroa Street was renamed Cesar Chavez Avenue, in honor of the late Mexican-American union leader and civil rights activist.

== History ==
In 1877, Harvey Henderson Wilcox, one of the earlier real estate owners from "back East", decided to subdivide more than 20 acres (8.1 ha) of land (mostly orchards and vineyards) along Sunset Boulevard, including what is today Hollywood and Vine.

In 1890, Belgian diplomat Victor Ponet bought 240 acres (97 ha) of the former Rancho La Brea land grant. His son-in-law, Francis S. Montgomery, inherited this property and created Sunset Plaza.

Originally, Sunset Boulevard only extended from Hollywood in the west to Marion Avenue in the Echo Park district in the east. The Board of Public Works proposed to extend Sunset east to Main Street in the Plaza by routing the road over the existing section of Bellevue Avenue, but the plan was delayed until approximately 1904, due to active opposition by affected land owners. According to the 1910 Baist Real Estate Survey Atlas, Sunset Boulevard reached the Plaza by that time, but it did so by two short and narrow segments which were not aligned with each other and thus did not provide a proper thoroughfare to it. In late 1912, several properties along the route were condemned so that the boulevard could be changed in both its width and its alignment. With these changes completed, Sunset Boulevard now reached North Main Street and continued as Marchessault along the northern end of the Plaza.

In 1921, a westward expansion of Sunset began, extending the road from the then-current terminus at Sullivan Canyon toward the coast. This land, a portion of the original 1838 holdings of Francisco Marquez, stretched across a mesa and became known as the "Riviera section". Will Rogers, who had bought much of this land as an investment, later donated it to the State of California creating Will Rogers State Historic Park.

c. 1931, Sunset was a paved road from Horn Avenue to Havenhurst Avenue.

The section variously marked and signed as Marchessault Street or East Sunset Boulevard, remained open to traffic until the late 1960s or early 1970s. At that time, Sunset was realigned one block north and Marchessault was closed to motor traffic.

The westernmost stretch of Sunset Boulevard in Pacific Palisades runs through an area devastated by the January 2025 Southern California wildfires. Many homes, businesses, and landmarks along the boulevard, such as the Pacific Palisades Business Block, were burned down.

== Cultural aspects ==
The Sunset Strip portion of Sunset Boulevard in West Hollywood has been famous for its active nightlife since at least the 1950s.

In contrast to other American cities where it referred to a concentration of radio retailers, in Los Angeles, Radio Row was understood in the 1940s–1950s as the area around the intersection of Sunset Boulevard and Vine Street in Hollywood, where the broadcasting facilities of all four major radio networks were located.

In the 1970s, the area between Gardner Street and Western Avenue was a center for street prostitution. Shortly after a much publicized incident in late June 1995, police raids drove out the majority of prostitutes on the Boulevard.

Part of Sunset Boulevard in Hollywood is also sometimes called "Guitar Row" due to the large number of guitar stores and music industry-related businesses, including the recording studios Sunset Sound Studios and United Western Recorders.

The portion of Sunset Boulevard that passes through Beverly Hills was once named Beverly Boulevard.

The boulevard is commemorated in Billy Wilder's film Sunset Boulevard (1950), the Andrew Lloyd Webber musical of the same name, and the 1950s television series 77 Sunset Strip. Jan and Dean's 1960s hit song "Dead Man's Curve" refers to a section of the road near Bel Air estates just north of UCLA's Drake Stadium where Jan Berry almost died in an automobile accident in 1966. The Buffalo Springfield song "For What It's Worth" was written about a riot at Pandora's Box, a Sunset Strip club, in 1966. In 1973, following the model of his Every Building on the Sunset Strip, Ed Ruscha photographed the entire length of Hollywood Boulevard with a motorized camera to produce a book in the form of a leporello.

Metro Local lines 2, 4 and 602 operate on Sunset Boulevard, with Line 2 running through most of Sunset Boulevard between Echo Park and UCLA, Line 4 between Sunset Junction and Downtown LA, and Line 602 from UCLA west. The Metro B Line operates a subway station at Vermont Avenue.

At 4334 W. Sunset Boulevard lies the wall featured on the cover of the late singer-songwriter Elliott Smith's 2000 album Figure 8. Since Smith's death in 2003, the wall has become a memorial for the artist; fans have left many personal messages there over the years.

== Landmarks (past and present) ==
- Sherry’s Club (now 1 OAK nightclub)
- Amoeba Records
- Andaz West Hollywood, formerly Hyatt West Hollywood
- Avenue of the Athletes
- Azizam
- Beverly Hills Hotel
- Blessed Sacrament Church
- Book Soup
- CBS Columbia Square
- CNN
- Carney's
- Chateau Marmont
- Cinerama Dome
- Comedy Store
- Crossroads of the World
- Directors Guild of America headquarters
- Dudley Do-Right Emporium
- Earl Carroll Theatre
- Emerson College
- The Garden of Allah
- Gazzarri's
- Gower Gulch
- Haldeman House
- Hollywood Athletic Club
- Hollywood High School
- Hollywood Home Savings and Loan
- Hollywood Palladium
- Hotel Bel-Air
- House of Blues
- KCET Studios
- KSCN-TV
- KTLA
- The London Fog
- Los Angeles Film School
- Marymount High School
- Metromedia Square (the former Fox Television Center and KTTV studios)
- Nickelodeon on Sunset
- Palisades Charter High School
- Porn Block of Fame
- Psychiatry: An Industry of Death Museum
- Rainbow Bar and Grill
- Robert Bridges House
- Rock Walk
- Self-Realization Fellowship Lake Shrine
- Spago
- Standard Hotel
- Sunset Gower Studios
- Sunset Junction
- Taix (restaurant)
- The Roxy Theatre
- Tiffany Theatre
- Tiki Ti
- United Western Recorders
- UCLA
- Viper Room
- Whisky a Go Go
- Will Rogers State Beach
- Will Rogers State Historic Park

== See also ==
- List of streets in Los Angeles
