= Robert Bridges House =

Notable residence in California

General information
- Address: 820 Chautauqua Boulevard
- Town or city: Pacific Palisades, California
- Country: United States
- Destroyed: January 2025

Design and construction
- Architect(s): Robert J. Bridges

The Robert Bridges House was a single-family house designed, built, and occupied by Los Angeles architect Robert Bridges. The home stood on tall concrete pillars above Sunset Boulevard in Pacific Palisades, Los Angeles. It was destroyed in the Palisades Fire in January 2025.

The Brutalist-style house, located at 820 Chautaqua Boulevard, was visible to drivers on Sunset Boulevard and stood 100 feet above the road.

Bridges bought the 29,095 square-foot lot lot on which the house stood for $40,000 in 1979 (equivalent to $173,297 in 2024). Bridges spent six years designing and building the three-story house, complete with three bedrooms and two bathrooms. Permits were first issued in 1986.

The house was supported by 68 13-inch wide steel piles. The exterior of the house was clad in redwood. The interior of the house had exposed concrete ceilings with furniture designed by Bridges and employed an open floorplan.

The concrete was poured by Bridges and three other men, with Bridges operating the crane himself. Retrospectively, Bridges described the construction "incredibly risky. We were constantly hanging off the side, doing feats of daring and stupidity". Bridges said that "It may look precarious, but it's not. From an engineering standpoint, this thing is absolutely rational".

Bridges and his family moved into the home in 1991. Bridges's wife had nightmares about falling shortly after the couple had moved in.

In a 2014 article on the house for The New York Times, Steven Kurutz wrote that the house was a "striking example of brutalism, yet it isn't the work of a renowned architect and doesn't appear on greatest-hit lists of the city's modernist masterworks".
