= Palisades Fire =

2025 wildfire in Southern California, US

- Part of the January 2025 Southern California wildfires
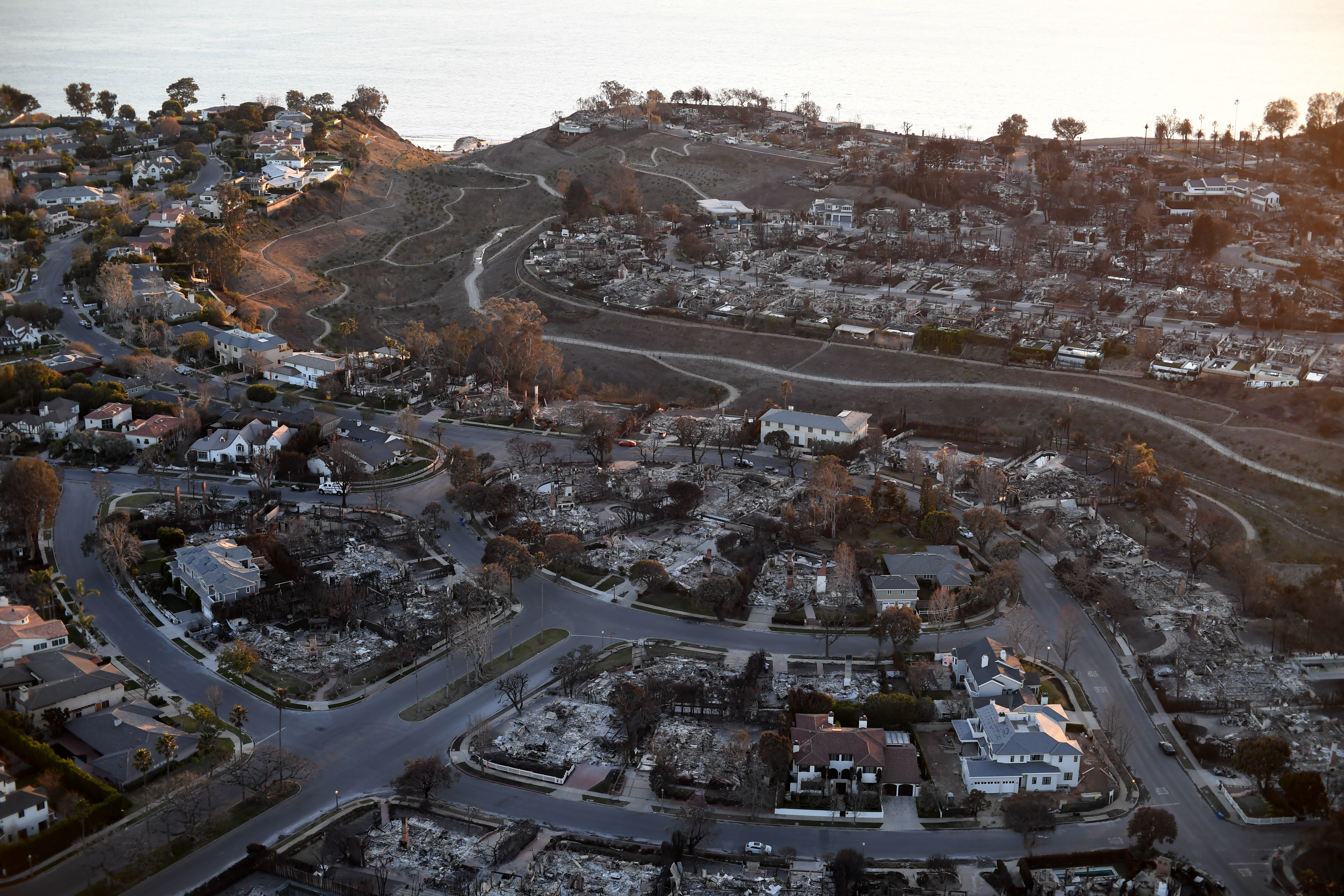
- Aerial view of homes destroyed by the Palisades fire in the early evening hours of January 15, 2025
- Date: January 7 –; January 31, 2025; (25 days)
- Location: Los Angeles County, California, U.S.
- Coordinates: 34°04′21″N 118°32′33″W

Statistics
- Status: Extinguished
- Burned area: 23,448 acres (9,489 ha; 95 km^{2}; 37 sq mi)

Impacts
- Deaths: 12
- Injuries: 4+
- Missing people: 7
- Evacuated: 105,000
- Structures destroyed: 6,837 (1,017 damaged)
- Cost: $25 billion (2025 USD)

Ignition
- Cause: Rekindling of earlier arson-caused wildfire
- Perpetrator: Jonathan Rinderknecht

Map
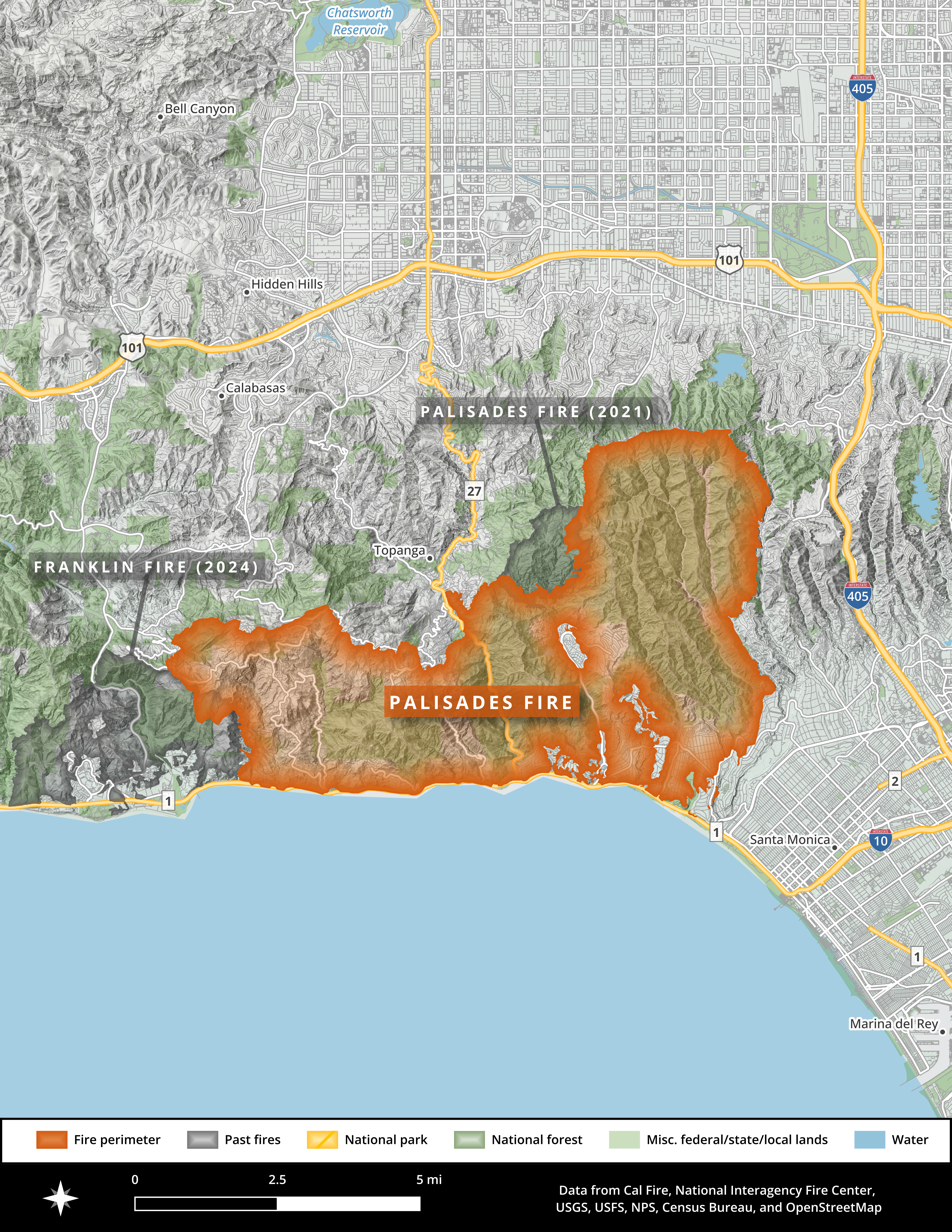
- The extent of the Palisades Fire burn area

The Palisades Fire was a highly destructive wildfire that began in the Santa Monica Mountains of Los Angeles County on January 7, 2025, and grew to destroy large areas of Pacific Palisades, Topanga, and Malibu before it was fully contained on January 31. One of a series of wildfires in Southern California driven by extremely powerful Santa Ana winds, it spread to 37 sq mi (95 km^{2}), killed 12 people, and destroyed 6,837 structures, making it the tenth-deadliest and third-most destructive California wildfire on record and the second most destructive to occur in the history of the city of Los Angeles. The fire burned simultaneously with the similarly destructive Eaton Fire at the foothills of the nearby San Gabriel Mountains.

On October 8, federal authorities arrested Jonathan Rinderknecht in Florida and charged him with three felony counts of arson, alleging that he used a combustible material to set an eight-acre (3.2 ha) fire on January 1 named the Lachman Fire that was not fully extinguished by the Los Angeles Fire Department and later reignited to become the Palisades Fire. On June 26, 2026, a mistrial was declared in Rinderknecht's federal trial. A retrial was pursued, and on November 20 Rinderknecht was found guilty on two counts of arson.

== Background ==
In early January 2025, a strong high-pressure system over the Great Basin created a steep northerly pressure gradient across Southern California. The system triggered powerful Santa Ana winds, katabatic winds that can develop when cooler, dense inland air is funneled through mountain passes and canyons toward the warmer coastal regions.

The area had experienced "eight months without any measurable rainfall", and much of the region had fallen into moderate drought conditions. A battalion chief for the California Department of Forestry and Fire Protection (CAL FIRE) told the Los Angeles Times that the conditions were "the perfect recipe for a large wildfire". The National Weather Service (NWS) issued red flag warnings on the morning of January 6, effective through Thursday evening, for multiple regions, including the Malibu coast, Santa Monica Mountains Recreational Area, and the San Gabriel, San Fernando, and Santa Clarita valleys.

NWS predicted a "life-threatening" windstorm and Santa Ana wind gusts were forecast to reach speeds of 60–80 miles per hour (97–129 km/h), with some gusts anticipated to reach 90 mph (140 km/h) in mountainous areas. Residents were urged to "use extreme caution with anything that can spark a wildfire" and those near forests to be prepared to evacuate. The danger posed by the windstorm and weather patterns led Caltrans to close several roads, including Topanga Canyon Boulevard between Mulholland Drive and Pacific Coast Highway.

As is common in red flag warnings, CAL FIRE pre-positioned firefighting assets across Southern California. The Los Angeles Department of Water and Power topped off all three of its 1-million-gallon water tanks in the area affected by the red flag warning, a precaution against the loss of water pressure during the sudden demands of firefighting, especially at higher altitudes. Despite these efforts, 20 percent of fire hydrants eventually ran out of water in the more elevated parts of Pacific Palisades.

== Progression ==
The fire was first reported at about 10:30 a.m. PST on January 7, 2025, covering around 10 acres (4.0 ha) of the mountains near Pacific Palisades. It quickly spread due to a combination of severe drought in Southern California (the driest 9-month period on record), and a worsening Santa Ana wind event. Within 20 minutes, the fire grew from 20 acres (8.1 ha) to 200 acres (81 ha). The California Department of Forestry and Fire Protection (CAL FIRE) said the blaze had reached more than 700 acres (280 ha) by 2:10 p.m., with over 250 firefighters fighting it as it started to reach homes. Just one hour later, an update from CAL FIRE stated that the fire had rapidly grown to 1,262 acres (511 ha). Gavin Newsom, the Governor of California, toured the fire on January 7, and said that many structures had been destroyed.

The intensification of the concurrent windstorm at night forced the grounding of firefighting aircraft, further hindering efforts to manage the wildfire's spread. The National Weather Service reported the highest wind gust in Pacific Palisades on January 7 was 38 mph (61 km/h) at 6:30 p.m. Firefighters faced significant challenges combating the blaze due to the steep terrain of the Santa Monica Mountains and the strong Santa Ana winds. These conditions hindered both ground and aerial firefighting operations, making containment efforts much more difficult. Firefighters called in from close by states like Oregon and Nevada to continue fighting the blaze. The fire reached the driveway adjacent to the Getty Villa; earlier in the day staff activated the site's fire safety plan which included closing off fire doors, running HVAC and humidity management systems, and turning on irrigation sprinklers. Most of the staff was evacuated but the Getty's crisis operations executives and security staff patrolled throughout the night, taking shifts outside, where they suppressed wind-blown flareups with "at least 40 five-pound fire extinguishers".

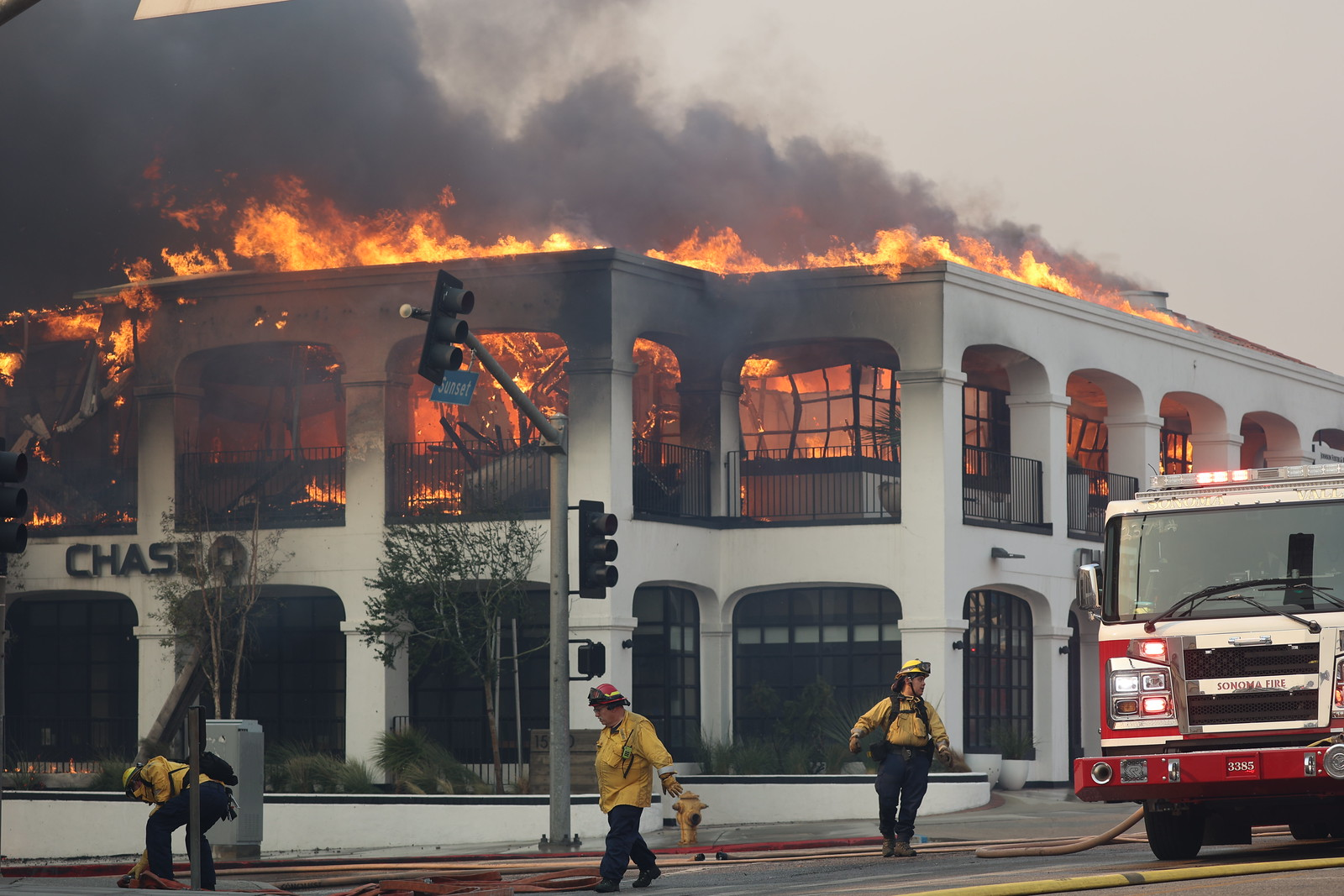
A Chase Bank branch on Sunset Boulevard burning on January 8

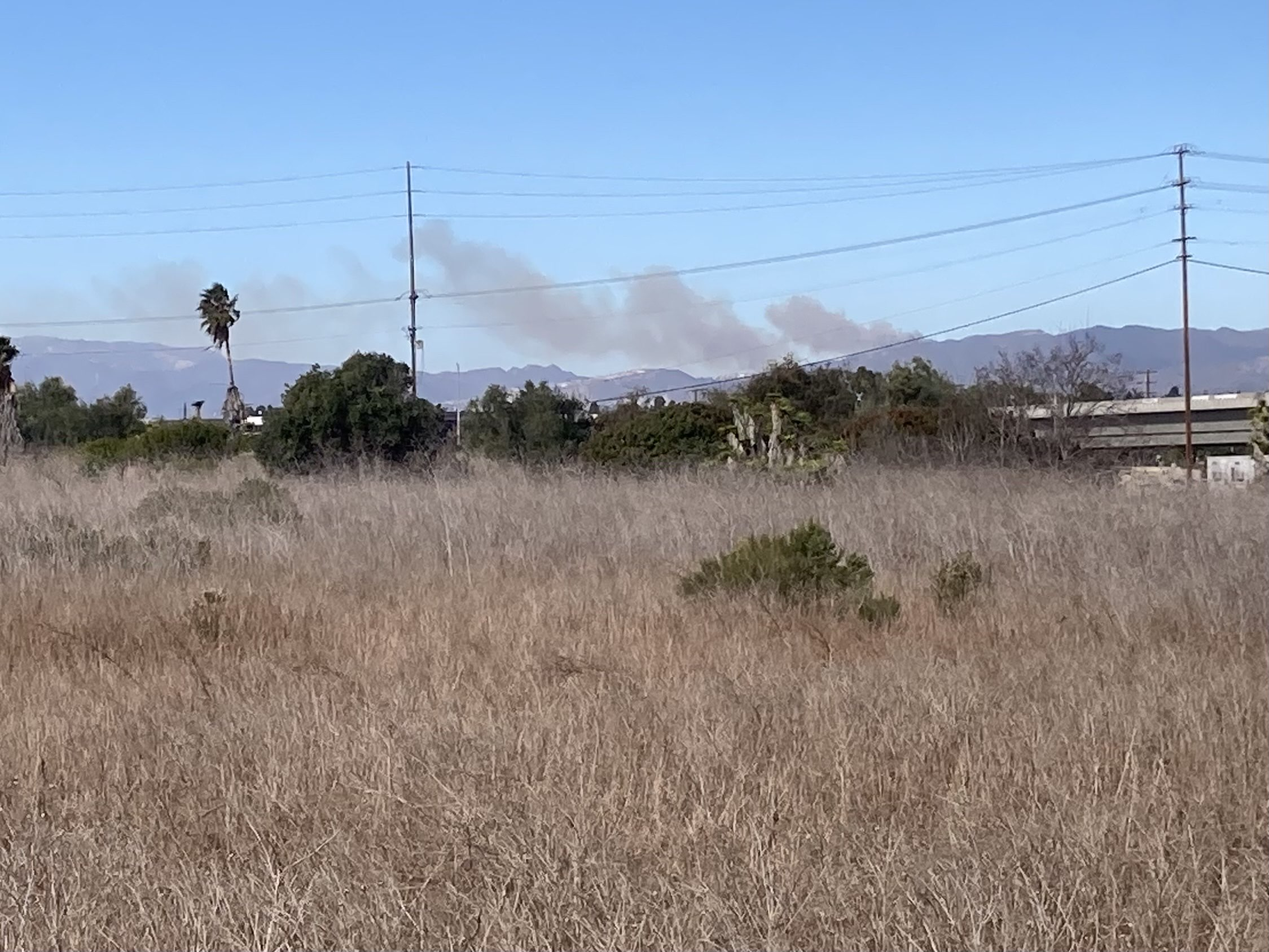
The fire on January 7, seen approximately three minutes after it was first reported

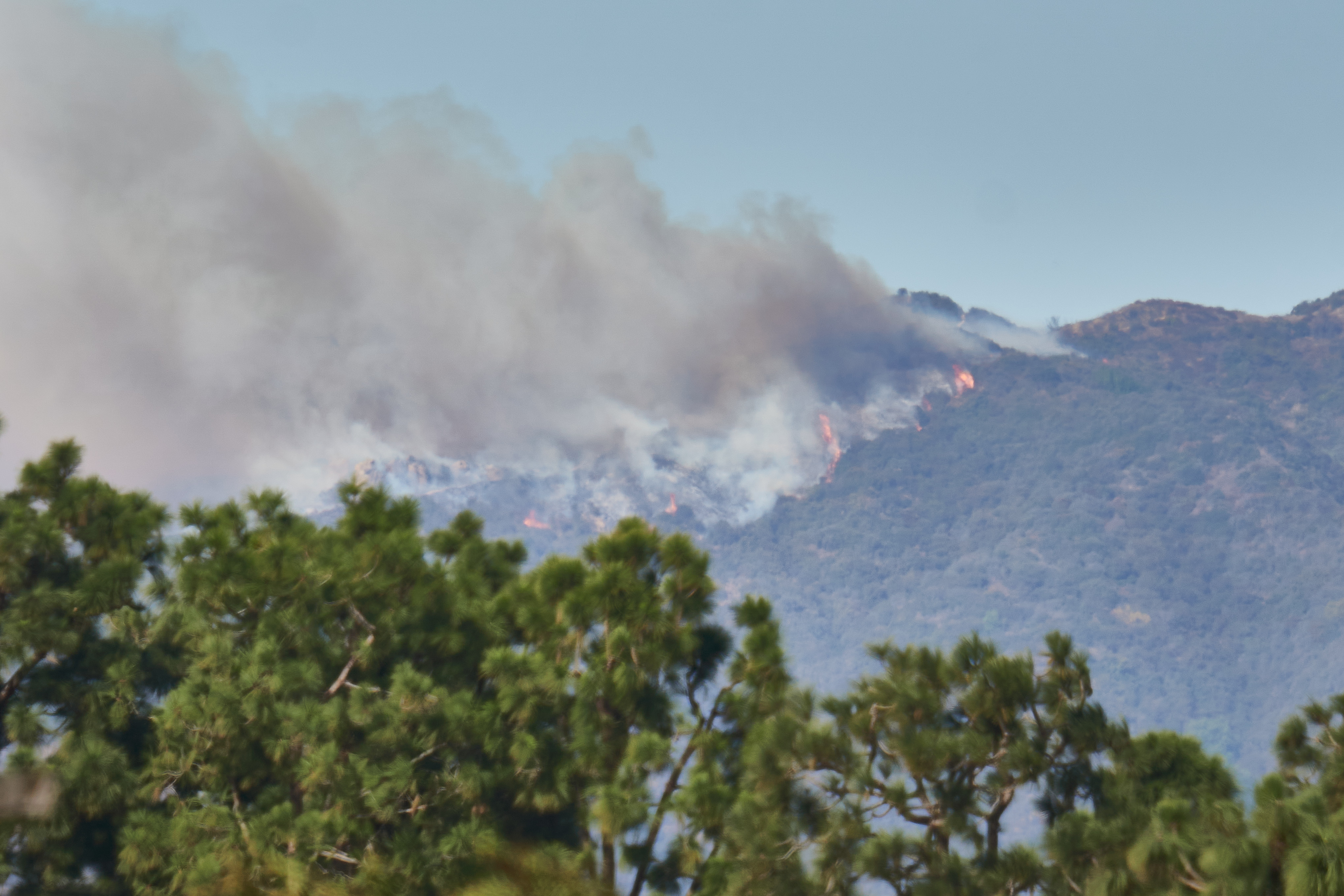
The fire at approximately 11:10 a.m. on January 7, as viewed from Ballona Wetlands

At 12:29 a.m. on January 8, a CAL FIRE status report said the fire had grown to 2,921 acres (1,182 ha). Hours later, 1,400 firefighters had been assigned to the fire which continued to grow as several injuries were reported, including a 25-year-old firefighter with a "serious head injury". Several beachfront properties in Malibu were destroyed by the wildfire. In a Los Angeles Fire Department (LAFD) press conference on the morning of January 8, LACoFD fire chief Anthony Marrone said that the fire had reached a size of more than 5,000 acres (2,000 ha) and had destroyed around 1,000 structures. Robert Luna, the sheriff of Los Angeles County, said that 37,000 people were under evacuation order due to the fire, adding that 15,000 structures were at risk of burning.

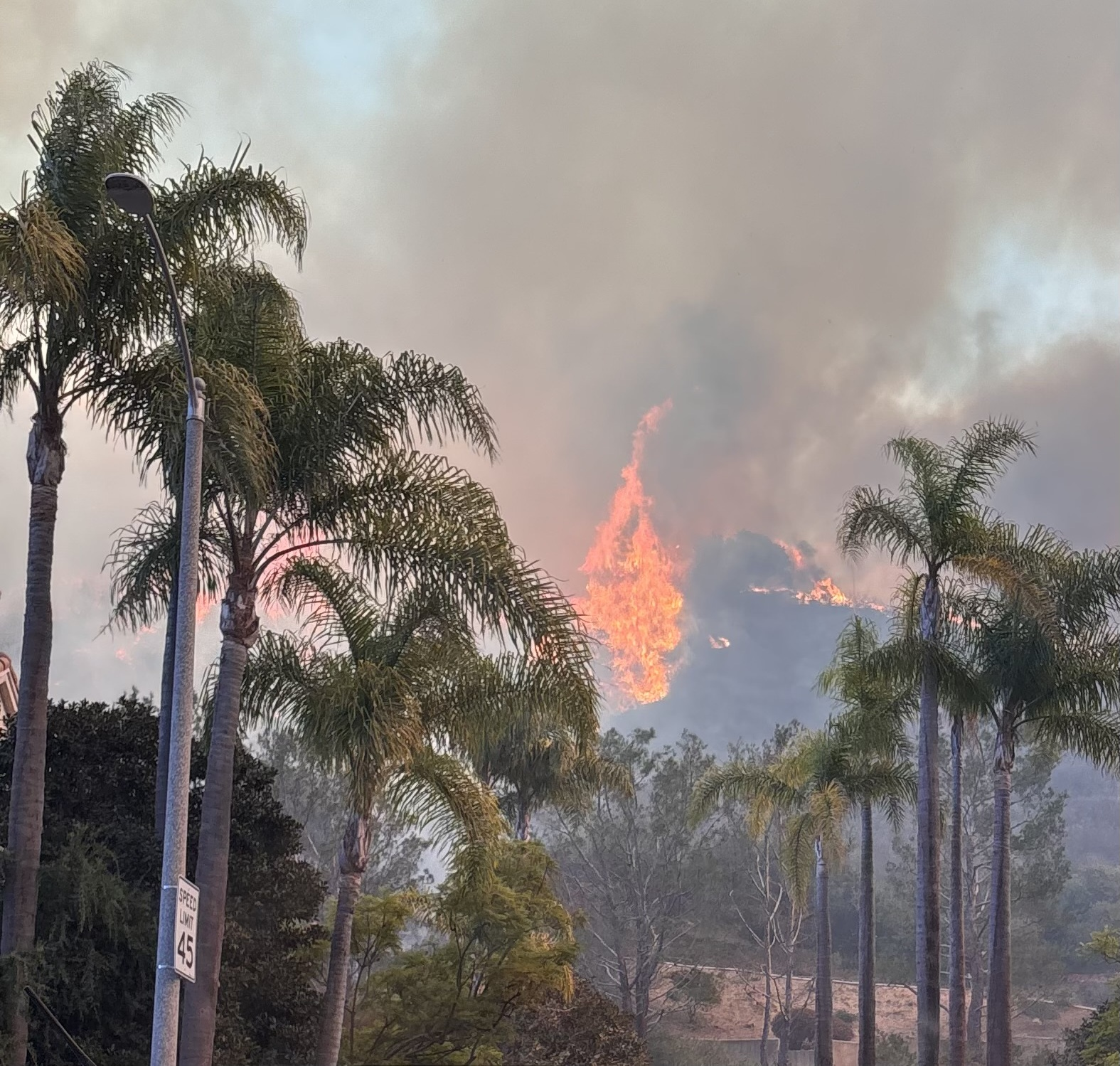
The fire as seen from near Palisades drive

A CAL FIRE status report at 11:45 a.m. on January 8 said the fire had grown to 11,802 acres (4,776 ha), a figure which had grown to 15,832 acres (6,407 ha) by 1:20 p.m. In another press conference which began at 3:15 p.m., LAFD fire chief Kristin Crowley said that 1,792 personnel have been deployed to assist in fighting the fire, adding that it was still growing and continued to demand "significant resources". A CAL FIRE status report at 11:10 p.m. said the fire had grown to 17,234 acres (6,974 ha). Human remains were found at a property near the Pacific Coast Highway in Malibu by the Los Angeles County Sheriff's Department (LASD) following a welfare check conducted due to a missing persons report.

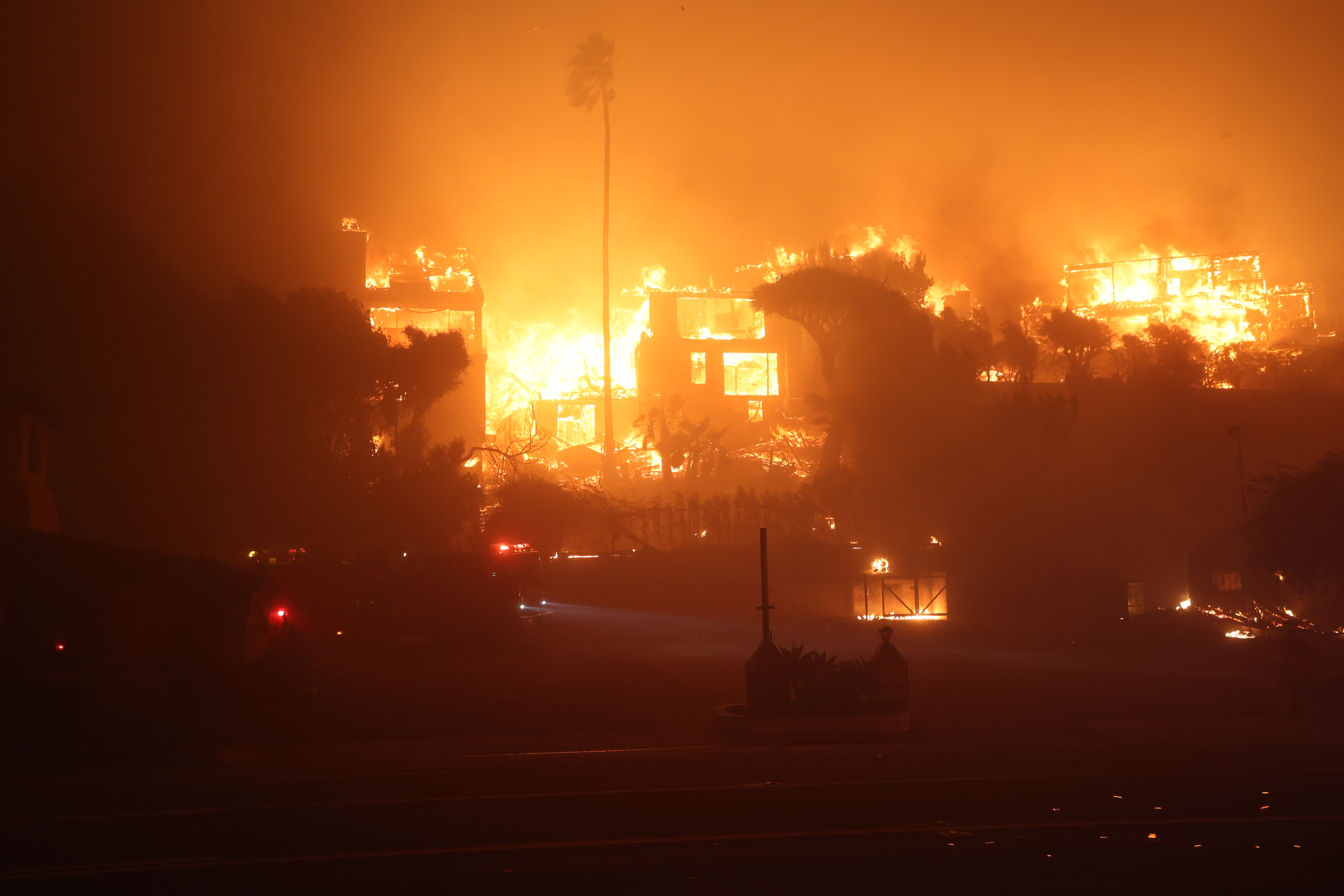
The Palisades Fire burning a structure on January 8

An update from fire authorities on January 9 said that over 5,300 structures had been destroyed by the blaze. It had grown to almost 20,000 acres (8,100 ha; 81 km^{2}; 31 sq mi). A man was detained on suspicion of igniting a fire in Woodland Hills, immediately north of where the fire was burning. In a press conference at 5:20 p.m., Crowley said there had been two deaths due to the fire. At 8:00 p.m., Newsom reported that the fire was six percent contained, after being at zero percent containment for more than 55 hours. A CAL FIRE status report at 6:45 p.m. said the fire had grown to 19,978 acres (8,085 ha). A firefighting aircraft collided with a drone while it was over the fire, suffering a hole in its wing but landing safely with no casualties. At 9:15 p.m., authorities reported that the death toll from all fires had risen to ten, with the Los Angeles County Department of Medical Examiner (DMEC) saying that the remains were still being identified.

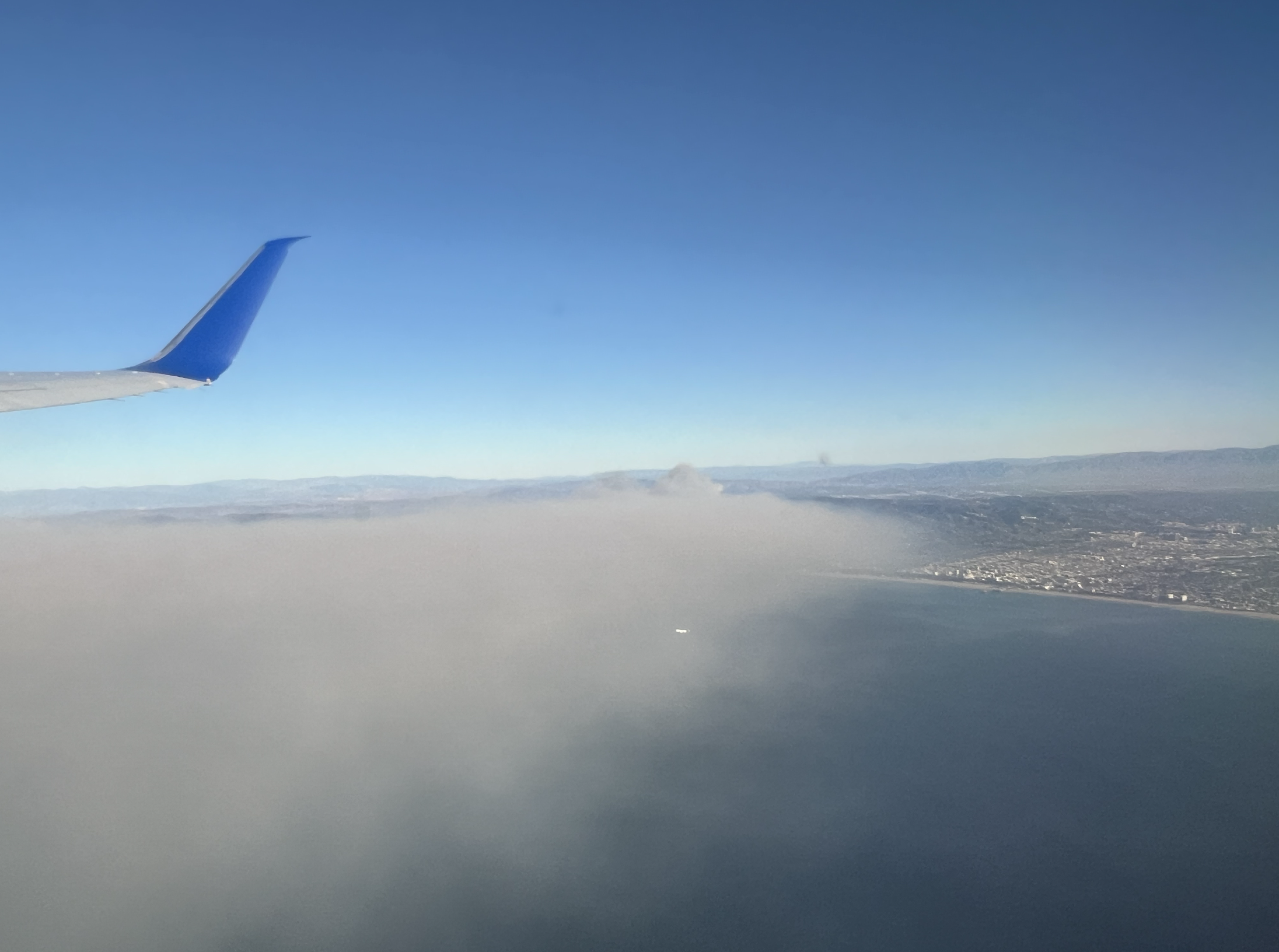
Smoke from the fire at 8:40 a.m. on January 10

On January 10, a CAL FIRE status report at 7:39 a.m. said the fire had grown to 20,438 acres (8,271 ha). During an update at 8:00 a.m., Crowley reported that the fire was at eight percent containment, with 3,073 personnel fighting it. Another CAL FIRE report at 9:20 a.m. said there had been three civilian injuries and two civilian fatalities, a number which increased to three by 12:08 p.m. Another update at 2:33 p.m. said the fire was at 21,317 acres (8,627 ha) and was still at eight percent containment, while an update from the DMEC said five fire-related deaths had taken place in areas affected by the blaze, namely Malibu, Pacific Palisades and Topanga. This number was later revised to three. Late on January 10, the Los Angeles County Department of Public Health declared a local health emergency in response to the fires and issued a Public Health Officer Order prohibiting the use of leaf blowers to improve air quality.

In a press conference at 8:00 a.m. on January 11, Todd Hopkins from the Unified IC CAL FIRE Incident Management Team said that the fire was at 11 percent containment and had grown by 1,000 acres (400 ha) overnight. He also said 105,000 people had evacuated as 426 homes were destroyed. That same day, the fire began to march towards Mandeville Canyon, new evacuation orders were made for the Tarzana and Encino neighborhoods, with evacuation warnings extending to south of Ventura Boulevard in Encino and western parts of Bel Air. At least one home in Mandeville Canyon had burned. A CAL FIRE status report at 9:39 a.m. said the fire had grown to 22,660 acres (9,170 ha); by 4:37 p.m. it had grown to 23,654 acres (9,572 ha). The DMEC said that the death toll of all fires had risen to 16: five in the Palisades Fire and 11 in the Eaton Fire. Doug Stewart, the mayor of Malibu, said one third of the city had been lost, adding that homes along the Pacific Coast Highway and the Big Rock neighborhood were 'gone'.

On January 12, a CAL FIRE status report at 6:33 a.m. said the fire had grown to 23,707 acres (9,594 ha). At 8:00 a.m., city officials held a press conference, where Crowley said 4,720 personnel were assigned to the blaze; Luna said that during a search of 364 properties three dead people were found and four people had been arrested for looting. A status report at 11:13 a.m. said the fire was at 23,713 acres (9,596 ha); after that the fire's growth ceased. At 5:00 p.m., the DMEC released an update stating that the death toll of all fires had risen to 24, eight of which were in the Palisades area. One of them died in hospital after succumbing to their injuries.

Perimeter of the Palisades Fire (map data)

By January 14, the death toll for the Palisades Fire had risen to nine, with a total of 25 deaths across the Palisades and Eaton fires. On January 16, the death toll rose to 10.

At the peak of firefighting efforts on January 19, assets from across the western US and international crews from both Canada and Mexico were deployed: firefighting personnel totaled over 5,677 across 551 fire engines, 42 water tenders, 43 helicopters, 48 bulldozers, 101 hand crews and 17 other assigned resources. Canada sent Canadair CL-415 aircraft to assist with containing the blaze. On January 21, a CAL FIRE status report at 6:32 p.m. revised the fire's size to 23,448 acres (9,489 ha), adding that it was at 65 percent containment. On January 30, the final CAL FIRE status report at 5:35 p.m. reported the fire at 95 percent containment, having caused 12 deaths and four injuries, as well as destroying 6,837 structures. By January 31, the fire had been fully contained after 24 days.

== Evacuation ==
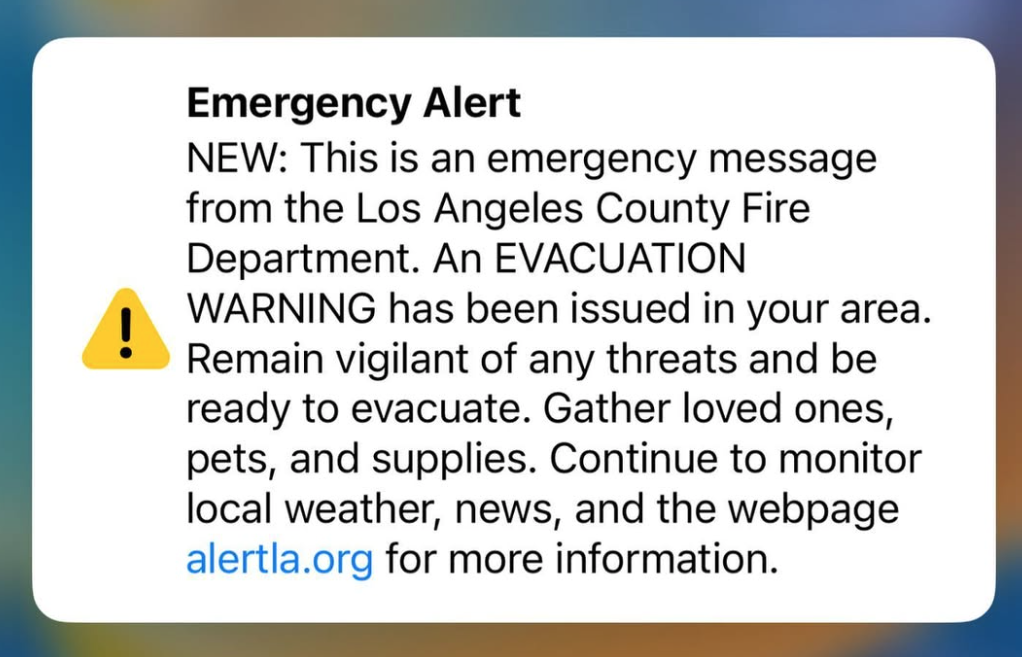
An alert from the Los Angeles County Fire Department sent out to the mobile phones of residents from certain areas, notifying them to be ready to evacuate

In a LAFD press conference on January 7, at 3:40 p.m., fire chief Kristin Crowley said that over 30,000 people were under evacuation orders, with more than 10,000 houses and 13,000 buildings under threat. During the conference, Marqueece Harris-Dawson, the president of Los Angeles City Council and acting mayor, declared a state of emergency in response to the fire.

During the hectic evacuation, some roads became gridlocked. In some areas, residents were seen fleeing their vehicles along the Pacific Coast Highway and taking refuge in the ocean to escape the advancing flames. As flames moved closer, people abandoned their cars and fled for their lives, some taking their keys with them; bulldozers were later called in to move almost 200 such vehicles off the road to make way for emergency vehicles. The Los Angeles Police Department sent around 140 officers to assist with evacuations and gridlock. Fire department officials issued an Emergency Alert System message, which was relayed by the National Weather Service, to notify residents of the evacuations, and subsequently ordered residents unable to evacuate to shelter in place. At 2:30 p.m. on January 8, an evacuation order covering part of Santa Monica was expanded to cover all areas north of Montana Avenue from the beach to 11th Street, with evacuation warnings for additional areas north of Montana Avenue and areas north of Wilshire Boulevard and west of 10th Street.

On January 10 at 6:00 p.m., evacuation warnings extended northeast, with the warnings changing to orders within the hour for the area enclosed by Sunset Boulevard to the south, Encino Reservoir to the north, I-405 to the east, and Mandeville Canyon to the west. Communities in this area include parts of Tarzana and Encino in the San Fernando Valley.

Evacuation orders were lifted on January 27, when the City of Los Angeles allowed resident-only access to the previously mandatory-evacuation areas.

== Impact ==
=== Structures destroyed ===
According to Wildfire Alliance statistics, the Palisades Fire destroyed 6,837 structures, per CAL FIRE's final report on January 30, 2025. Earlier estimates included 1,900 structures by January 8 (Wildfire Alliance) and 3,501 by February 4 (LAFD), reflecting ongoing assessments, making it one of the most destructive in Los Angeles's history after the Eaton Fire, which destroyed 9,418 structures and damaged 1,073 structures, per CAL FIRE's final report on January 30, 2025. Both surpassed the Sayre Fire, which destroyed 604 structures in 2008, and the Bel Air Fire which destroyed nearly 500 houses in 1961. Smoke from the fire and other nearby fires caused severe air pollution in the Los Angeles area, with residents advised to wear masks in areas rated as red on the air quality index.

The fire completely destroyed much of Pacific Palisades; almost every structure in the area north of Sunset Boulevard burned to the ground. With the exception of the Palisades Village outdoor mall, most of the neighborhood's downtown was leveled. Destroyed or heavily damaged structures included the Community United Methodist Church of Pacific Palisades, Pacific Palisades Presbyterian Church, Corpus Christi Catholic Church, St. Matthew's Episcopal Parish School, Village School, and the landmarked Pacific Palisades Business Block building. An archive containing at least 100,000 scores by Arnold Schoenberg was destroyed; no original manuscripts were lost, however it was the main collection which owner Belmont Music rented out to musicians and orchestras.

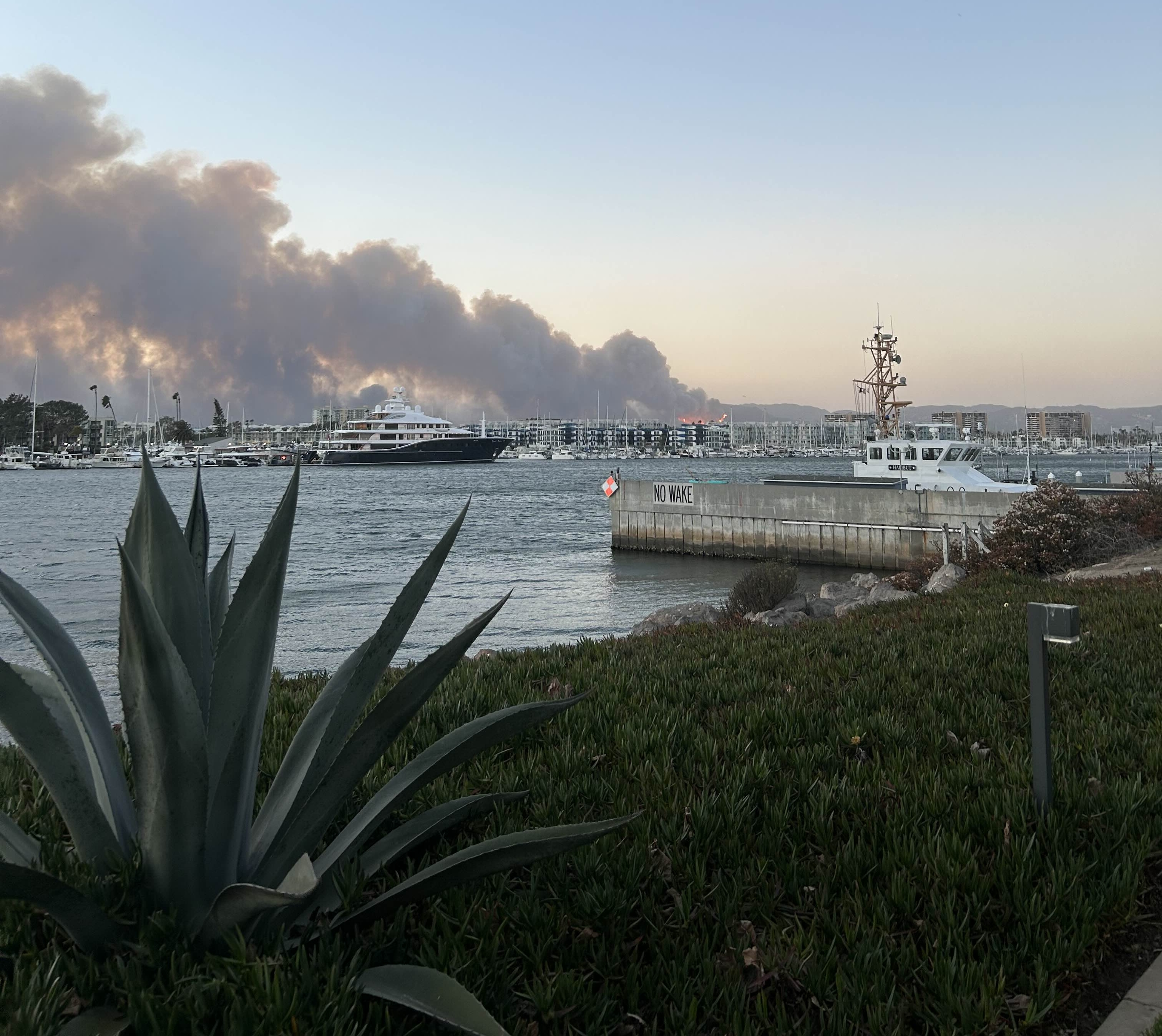
Smoke from the Palisades Fire viewed from Marina Del Rey on January 7

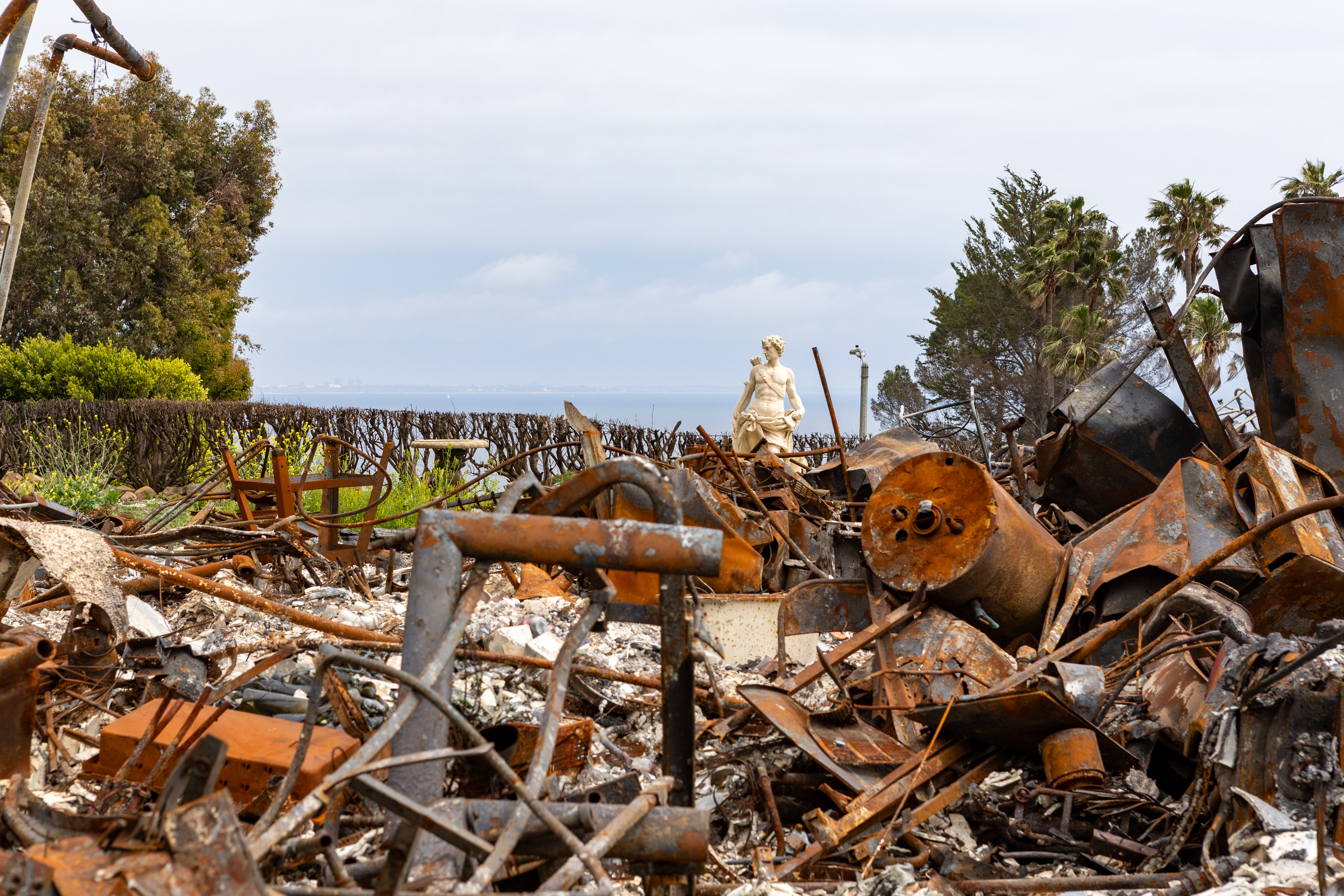
Wildfire-damaged homes across Malibu await debris removal by U.S. Army Corps of Engineers contractors as part of the ongoing recovery mission, May 2, 2025

The Palisades branch of the Los Angeles Public Library was destroyed. The Los Angeles Unified School District schools Palisades Elementary and Marquez Elementary Schools were destroyed. Palisades Charter High School was "badly damaged", with around 40 percent of the campus being damaged or destroyed. The main classroom and administration buildings were successfully protected by fire crews, but buildings on the edge of campus, closer to Sunset, burnt down. The Theatre Palisades was destroyed by the fire, and vegetation at the Getty Villa caught fire although the building itself was unscathed. The house of Will Rogers and the stables at the Will Rogers State Historic Park were destroyed; park staff safely evacuated the horses and removed some of the exhibited memorabilia. The historic Topanga Ranch Motel at Topanga State Park also burned down. A total of 30 buildings across the two parks were destroyed including staff housing. Restaurants along Pacific Coast Highway that burned included Cholada Thai, Moonshadows, the Reel Inn and Rosenthal Wine Bar & Patio. The house on Alma Real Drive where Robby Krieger wrote The Doors song "Light My Fire" and the Robert Bridges House perched atop Sunset Boulevard were also destroyed. The modernist Keeler House was also destroyed. The entire neighborhood of the Pacific Palisades Bowl Mobile Estates was destroyed. Other architecturally significant homes destroyed included the 708 House, a 1949 Richard Neutra house designed for Nancy and Benedict Freedman, the 1952 Southdown Estates development designed by A. Quincy Jones and Fred Emmons, and a 1969 Conrad Buff and Donald Hensman-designed house on Pacific Coast Highway. One house that survived the fire was destroyed by a mudslide. The house of art dealer Ron Rivlin was destroyed along with a collection of more than 200 artworks, featuring significant pieces by Andy Warhol and Keith Haring among others. The Getty Villa Museum planned to reopen after a seven-month closure. Restoration efforts at the Getty Villa Museum included deep cleaning, system flushes, air and water filter replacements, and the removal of over 1,300 fire-damaged trees.

=== Notable people affected ===
Numerous people lost homes in the fire, including Eric Braeden, Jeff Bridges, Adam Brody and Leighton Meester, Patrick Bruel, Michael Connelly, Barbara Corcoran, Denise Crosby, Billy Crystal, KCRW radio host Chris Douridas, Cary Elwes, Max Emerson, Anna Faris, Mel Gibson, John Goodman, Jennifer Grey, Julia Louis-Dreyfus, Ed Harris and Amy Madigan, Paris Hilton, Anthony Hopkins, Bobby Jenks, Tina Knowles, Jhené Aiko, Ricki Lake, Larry LaLonde, Eugene Levy, Tiffany Michelle, Heidi Montag and Spencer Pratt, Rosie O'Donnell, Eric Christian Olsen and Sarah Wright Olsen, JJ Redick, Melissa Rivers, Daniel Shemtob, Cobie Smulders and Taran Killam, Candy Spelling, Miles Teller, Milo Ventimiglia, Jonathan Joss and Diane Warren.

On NBC News Daily, actor Steve Guttenberg related his experiences trying to get to his house. He advised the public to leave car keys with the cars so they can be moved to make way for fire trucks. He and others volunteered in helping first responders. Gary Hall Jr. lost his home and all of his Olympic medals in the fire; a few days after, Thomas Bach, the president of the International Olympic Committee, announced that he would be provided with replica medals to replace them.

=== Other effects ===
The property damage caused by the fire resulted in vast liabilities for home insurance companies. In particular, due to other insurers pulling out of the region, the California FAIR Plan had approximately $6 billion of exposure in the area covered by the Palisades Fire as of January 8, 2025. Air tankers dropped thousands of gallons of red flame retardant in the hills around Los Angeles as firefighters attempted to limit the devastation from multiple wildfires. The events canceled or impacted by the fire included the Los Angeles premieres of the films Wolf Man, One of Them Days and Unstoppable.

A Volkswagen Type 2 (also known as a Volkswagen Transporter or Volkswagen Bus) nicknamed Azul for its blue color survived the fire and made national headlines after it was photographed amidst burnt out ruins. Volkswagen began restoring the bus in July.

== Reactions ==
California Governor Gavin Newsom traveled to Los Angeles to observe the initial fire response as well as to meet with state, local and federal officials; President Joe Biden was in Los Angeles for a White House event on January 7 commemorating the creation of two new national monuments. Concerns were raised about the 117 million-gallon Santa Ynez Reservoir in Pacific Palisades being empty months before the fire started. Los Angeles Mayor Karen Bass was in Ghana when the fire initially broke out, after a prior pledge not to conduct foreign trips as mayor. Bass cut her trip short and she returned to Los Angeles on January 7 via U.S. military transport.

Political figures on the right swiftly voiced outrage against Governor Newsom and Mayor Bass. X Corp Chairman and CTO Elon Musk called the Mayor "utterly incompetent". President-Elect Donald Trump criticized Newsom on Truth Social, saying "Governor Gavin Newscum refused to sign the water restoration declaration put before him that would have allowed millions of gallons of water, from excess rain and snow melt from the North, to flow daily into many parts of California, including the areas that are currently burning in a virtually apocalyptic way." Trump subsequently issued an executive order titled Emergency Measures to Provide Water Resources in California and Improve Disaster Response in Certain Areas, and orchestrated the release of water from Lake Kaweah and Lake Success four days after taking office, while the fires were still burning. Despite Trump's claims, the water was wasted and never reached Southern California because these reservoirs empty into the Tulare Lake basin, not Southern California. President Trump also visited a burned area at that time and held a press conference with Mayor Bass in Fire Station 69. Trump publicly argued with Bass, criticizing the amount of city regulation that he believed to be in the way of rebuilding burnt areas, citing what he called the Mayor's unclear definition of "hazardous waste".

== Investigation ==
The Bureau of Alcohol, Tobacco, Firearms and Explosives deployed a National Response Team to investigate the origins of the fire. According to the Los Angeles Times, the two leading theories suggest a rekindling of a prior January 1 fire, or the ignition of a new fire entirely at the same location. In May 2025, ATF conducted a controlled burn in the Palisades Highlands in attempt to gather more information on the origins of the fire.

=== Relationship to the Lachman Fire ===
At 12:17 a.m. on January 1, 2025, it was reported that a small brush fire had started on the ridgeline along the popular Skull Rock trail. Known as the Lachman Fire, it reached eight acres (3.2 ha) before forward progress was stopped shortly after 3:30 a.m., with mop-up and patrol operations continuing for 36 hours after.

The small brush fire, dubbed the Lachman Fire, sparked after neighbors said they heard fireworks, a claim supported by eyewitness videos recorded in the area at the time of ignition. Multiple residents in the area reported that fireworks had allegedly caused the ignition of the Lachman Fire on January 1. Sources with knowledge of the investigation into the Lachman Fire also believe it was sparked by fireworks. The San Francisco Chronicle interviewed multiple residents who described the Skull Rock trail as a popular hangout for youths, and that youths setting off fireworks was a persistent problem in the Palisades area. In the years prior, some residents sought to prosecute those behind the fireworks, but were told that local police had limited resources. Residents also brought the issue to the Palisades Town Council. The criminal complaint filed by an ATF agent concluded that the cause of the fire was the introduction of an open flame (likely a lighter) to a combustible material.

The ATF investigation determined that the Lachman Fire and the Palisades Fire were one and the same, with the former being suppressed but remaining smoldering underground in the dense vegetation, and breaking out during high winds. This confirmed earlier suspicions, which were under investigation, as the two fires started in the same location along the Temescal Ridge. Analyses of satellite imagery suggest that the Palisades Fire started close to the burn scar of the Lachman Fire, a claim corroborated by some residents. Assistant Chief Joe Everett of the LAFD expressed skepticism about the possibility of reignition after the cold-trailing operation and 36-hour patrol that followed the Lachman Fire; nevertheless, this is exactly what the ATF investigation determined had happened. Ed Nordskog, a former arson investigator for the Los Angeles County Sheriff's Department, noted that embers can stay buried until a wind event sets them free. Michael Gollner, a fire scientist and professor of mechanical engineering at the University of California, Berkeley, stated that "It's certainly possible that something from that previous fire, within a week, had rekindled and caused the ignition."

Palisades residents interviewed by the Los Angeles Times reported smelling smoke on the morning of January 7, before the appearance of the first flames at 10:15 a.m. A hiker on the trails near Skull Rock reported smelling smoke at 9:00 a.m. In an interview with The New York Times, another resident, hiking an hour before the eruption of the Palisades Fire, reported seeing smoke wafting in the area near the burn scar of the New Year's fire.

=== Fire investigation arrest ===
The mugshot of Jonathan Rinderknecht, who has been convicted of arson in connection to the fire

On October 8, 2025, multiple law enforcement sources confirmed the arrest of 29-year-old Uber driver Jonathan Rinderknecht apprehended near his home in West Melbourne, Florida, in connection with the fires—as both federal and local law enforcement officials cited a "significant development" in the criminal investigation into the blazes. Officials confirmed that West Melbourne police arrested Rinderknecht during a traffic stop conducted in the Sawgrass Lakes community near Interstate 95, the same area where Rinderknecht lived at the time. A traffic ticket that Rinderknecht received in Palm Bay from two months before his arrest indicated that he lived in the area. The complaint alleged that Rinderknecht was at the location of the fire at the time it started, no one else was there, no fireworks were in the vicinity at the time, and that "[t]he cause of the fire was determined to be the introduction of an open flame (likely a lighter) to a combustible material such as vegetation or paper."

Rinderknecht was born in Indiana on November 28, 1995, but spent his early years out of the United States, near Marseille in Southern France, where his parents were Baptist missionaries. He holds French citizenship from his father and speaks French fluently. The family later returned to the United States when he was a child and resided back in Indiana. Rinderknecht briefly resided in Grand Rapids, Michigan, according to a Hart, Michigan, resident who knew him. Rinderknecht—who had lived in the Los Angeles area since 2019 and worked as an Uber driver in the Hollywood area before moving to Florida after the fires—had no prior criminal history. According to a pastor from Lima, Ohio, who knew Rinderknecht's family, Rinderknecht's mother was also a Florida resident.

Following his arrest, Rinderknecht was charged with starting the blaze that began on New Year's Day 2025. Those flames were put out by firefighters, but sparks allegedly "smoldered underground [undetected] for days before [the fire was reignited by high winds and] spread above ground".

The suspect briefly appeared inside the George C. Young Federal Building and Courthouse in Orlando, where he was charged in federal court with felonious malicious "destruction of property by means of fire". All three of his siblings, two sisters and a brother, appeared in court, with one of his sisters sobbing after the judge made his ruling, as Rinderknecht was held without bond. He was transferred to the John E. Polk Correctional Facility in Sanford, Florida, afterward to face charges.

ATF special agent Thomas Harrison later testified that Rinderknecht had moved into the home of his three siblings in West Melbourne in May 2025, and they lived there for five months. His family have since moved out and had started eviction proceeding against him out of fear for their safety. West Melbourne Police were twice called to the house in September 2025. During the first incident, Rinderknecht got into an argument with his sister and her husband and threatened to burn the house down. In the second incident, the suspect's father, who visited Florida from southern France, grew concerned when Rinderknecht said he had a firearm and would use it in self-defense. No arrests were made or charges filed in either incident.

==== Possible motives ====
Investigation indicated that Rinderknecht professed admiration for Luigi Mangione, the man accused of killing UnitedHealthcare CEO Brian Thompson. Prior to the fire, he allegedly voiced his support for Mangione to his Uber passengers, some of whom were unsettled by his comments and erratic driving. In an interview with investigators, Rinderknecht stated that someone might have wanted to burn the Palisades "out of resentment of the rich enjoying their money", by whom he felt "enslaved". Court records confirm that Rinderknecht searched for Mangione-related news, using the search terms "free Luigi Mangione", "let's take down all the billionaires" and "reddit let's kill all the billionaires". In addition, prosecutors claim that Rinderknecht was distraught over a relationship with a former co-worker, angry about not having any New Year's Eve plans, and had an obsession with fire. An examination of the Rinderknecht's digital footprint revealed a ChatGPT prompt for a "burning city". He also asked ChatGPT, "Are you at fault if a fire is lift [sic] because of your cigarettes?"

=== Other possible causes ===
According to The New York Times, a lawyer was looking into the possibility of a downed power line causing the fire. A 2019 project by the Los Angeles Department of Water and Power (LADWP) to replace old power lines for wildfire mitigation was temporarily stalled after it had damaged 183 Astragalus brauntonii plants, an endangered species. The department agreed to pay a fine in 2020 for the damage and won approval to resume the work, but it did not proceed. The Times discovered power line debris near the point of ignition, but noted that witness photographs show that the nearest power line was still intact after the fire began, and that many further damaged utility lines to the north were only consumed by the fire a day later.

A lawsuit filed by victims of the fire against the city of Los Angeles and the LADWP claimed that around 10:30 p.m. on January 7, power lines downed by the Palisades fire could have caused a secondary fire. The LADWP responded with a public statement clarifying that the lines in question were manually de-energized around 2:15 p.m. earlier that day.

=== Federal trial ===
On June 26, 2026, federal judge Anne Hwang declared a mistrial in Rinderknecht's federal arson trial after the jury continued to remain deadlocked. The government pursued a retrial, which began with opening statements on November 4, 2026. On November 20, he was convicted of setting the fire.

== Growth and containment ==
Date	Acres Burned	Containment	Citation
January 7	1,262		
January 8	17,234		
January 9	19,978		
January 10	21,317		
January 11	23,654		
January 12	23,713		
January 13	23,713		
January 14	23,713		
January 15	23,713		
January 16	23,713		
January 17	23,713		
January 18	23,713		
January 19	23,713		
January 20	23,713		
January 21	23,448		
January 22	23,448		
January 23	23,448		
January 24	23,448		
January 25	23,448		
January 26	23,448		
January 27	23,448		
January 28	23,448		
January 29	23,448		
January 30	23,448		
January 31	23,448		

== See also ==
- 1978 Agoura-Malibu firestorm – 1978 wildfires in Southern California
- 2025 California wildfires
- 2026 Kimberly-Clark distribution center fire – Warehouse fire in California, US
- Clampitt Fire – 1970 wildfire in southern California, US
- List of California wildfires
- Oakland firestorm of 1991 – Suburban wildland-urban interface conflagration in California
