= Ralph Terrazas =

American fire fighting official

Ralph M. Terrazas
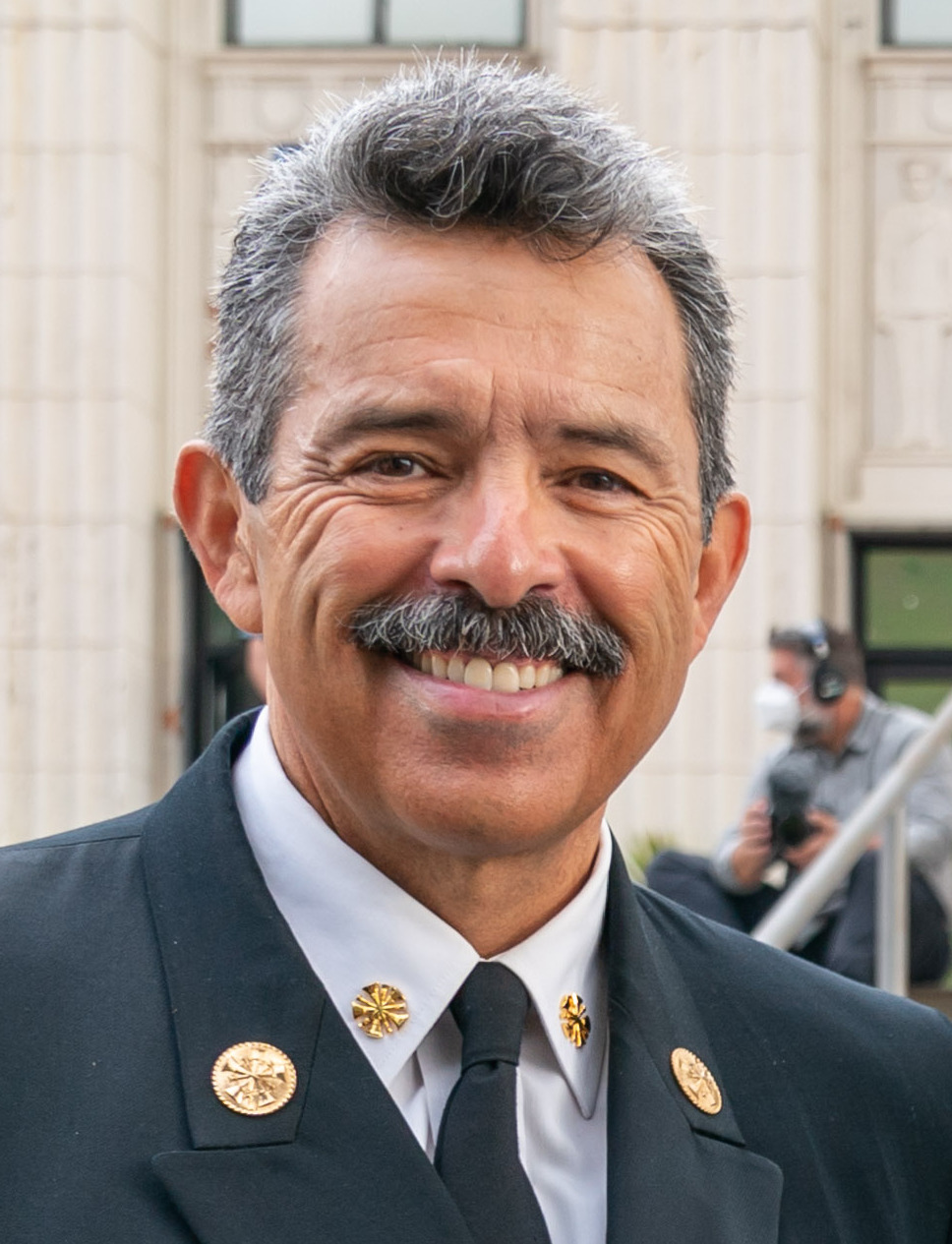
- Terrazas in 2022

18th Chief of the Los Angeles Fire Department
- In office August 8, 2014 – March 25, 2022
- Preceded by: James G. Featherstone (interim)
- Succeeded by: Kristin Crowley

Ralph Terrazas was the chief of the Los Angeles Fire Department (LAFD) from 2014 to 2022. He was the first Latino to serve in the role. He was preceded by James G. Featherstone as interim chief and succeeded by Kristin Crowley.
