= Kristin Crowley =

American fire chief

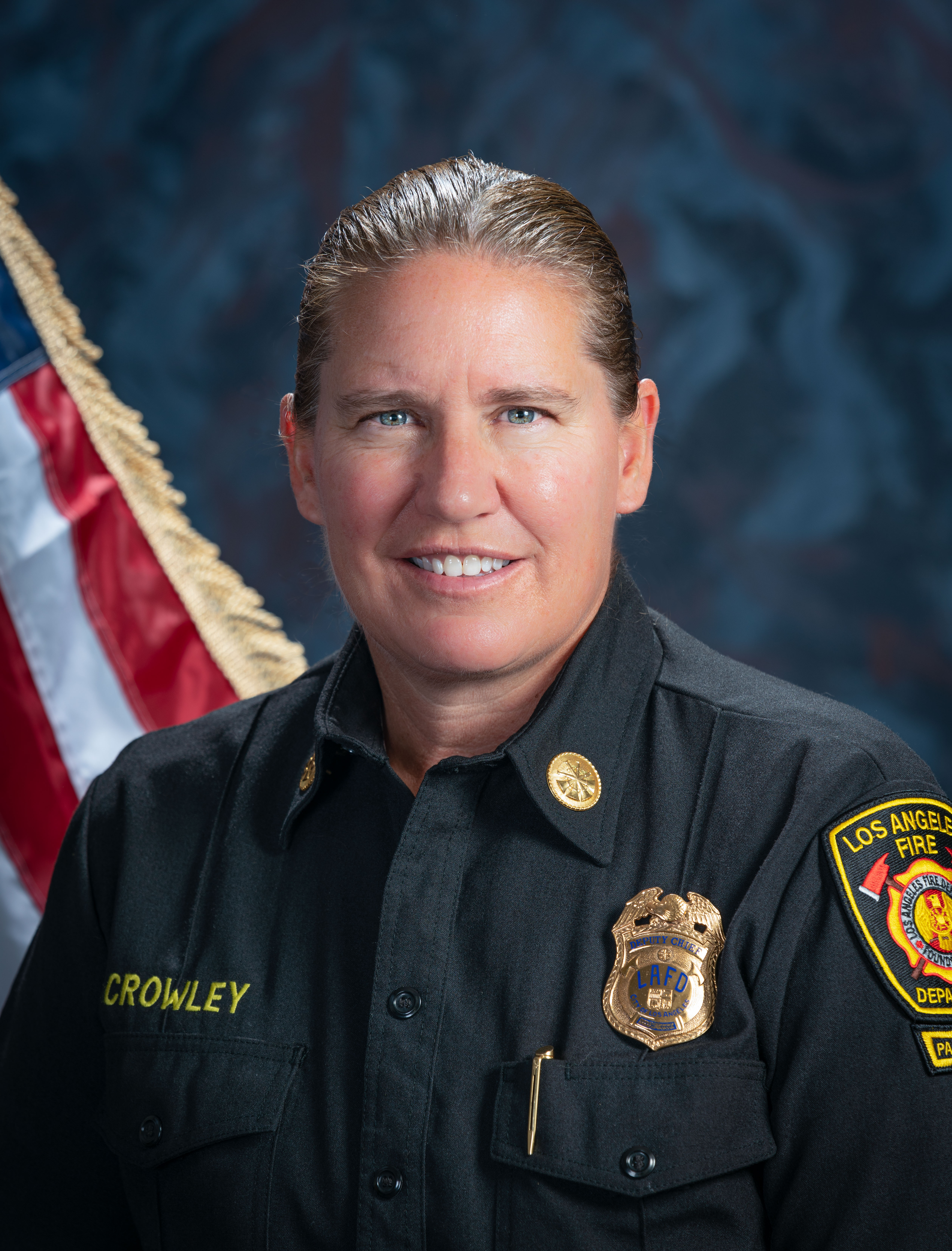
- Official portrait, 2019

19th Chief of the Los Angeles Fire Department
- In office March 25, 2022 – February 21, 2025
- Deputy: Kristine Larson
- Preceded by: Ralph Terrazas
- Succeeded by: Ronnie Villanueva (Interim)

Personal details
- Born: Green Bay, Wisconsin, U.S.
- Children: 3
- Education: Saint Mary's College

Kristin M. Crowley is an American former firefighter who was chief of the Los Angeles Fire Department (LAFD) from 2022 to 2025.

== Career ==
Crowley passed the firefighters' exam in 1998, finishing in the top 50 out of more than 16,000 tests taken. She joined the LAFD in 2000. During her time at the department, she has held the roles of firefighter, paramedic, engineer, fire inspector, captain, battalion chief, assistant chief, fire marshal and deputy chief. Crowley became Los Angeles' first female fire marshal in 2016.

Crowley was named Fire Chief in 2022, replacing Ralph Terrazas, who had assumed the role in 2014. Upon her appointment, Crowley noted that in addition to "maintaining firefighters' safety, health and overall well-being", she planned to promote a "work environment that is free of harassment, discrimination and hazing". As Chief, Crowley encouraged programs that increased diversity in the department, saying that a diverse department was needed to serve a diverse city.

In 2023, she was appointed to the Homeland Security Advisory Council, the second fire chief to serve in that role. In June 2024, Crowley was a grand marshal at Los Angeles Pride. She oversaw the department's response to the January 2025 Southern California wildfires.

On February 21, 2025, Mayor Karen Bass fired Crowley, claiming that Crowley had left the department unprepared in advance of the outbreak of the Palisades Fire. Bass was in Ghana during the fires, which she linked to Crowley's having failed to warn her of the fire danger, although Crowley has pushed back on this. The decision to fire Crowley was criticized by many, including philanthropist and former mayoral candidate Rick Caruso, who alongside various media outlets linked the firing to Crowley speaking out about fire department budget cuts.

== Personal life ==
Crowley is married and has three children. She is part of the LGBTQ+ community.
