= Encino Reservoir =

Reservoir located in Encino, Los Angeles, California

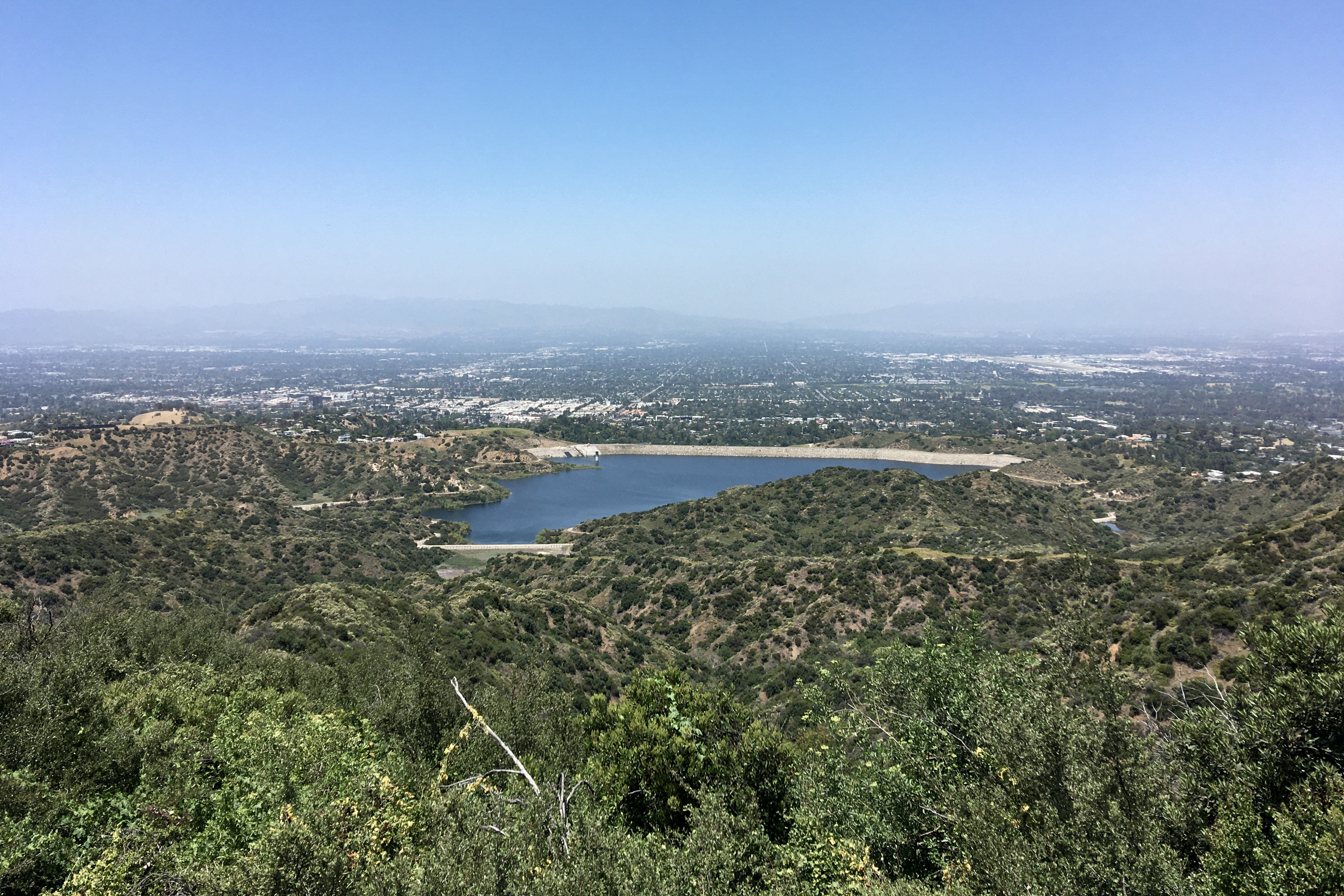
Encino Reservoir

The Encino Reservoir, is a controlled lake created by the damming of Encino creek. It is located near the Encino neighborhood in the San Fernando Valley, California. With construction completed in 1924, it is owned by the Los Angeles Department of Water and Power (LADWP). The Encino reservoir no longer provides drinking water to the population. However, it is kept open for other uses. The reservoir stores water which can be used to maintain supply through the Los Angeles aqueduct. It also helps to regulate the use of water for irrigation in the summer months. The reservoir was a source of water used for firefighting during the 2025 Palisades Fire.

== History ==
The reservoir was built in 1921 and 1924 by the civil engineer, William Mulholland to supply drinking water to the population of the San Fernando Valley. It was designed without a control gate. Instead, there would be one pipe from the dam with a valve which would remain open in order to maintain pressure in the water distribution system of the San Fernando Valley. At the time, the reservoir was known as an "equalizer" of water pressure.

A roll-filled dam construction method was used; one where earth is progressively moved into place in layers which are sprinkled with water and then compacted to create an embankment. After the first filling, there was seepage from the dam. Between 1949 and 1950, rectification of this problem was made in the form of a downstream filter and buttress. Between 1960 and 1962 the up-stream part of the original dam and its alluvium, down to bedrock, was removed and a new 51.2 m (168 feet) roll-filled dam was constructed.

Prior to 1971, the Encino reservoir together with the Lower Stone Canyon and Lower Van Norman reservoirs provided 70 percent of the water stored within the jurisdiction of the LADWP. In comparison, 80 percent of water needs of Los Angeles were provided from snowmelt at the eastern slopes of the Sierra Nevada draining into the Owens Valley and from there through the Los Angeles Aqueduct system.

In 2002, the Encino dam and reservoir complex included four 227000 L (60000 gallon) surge tanks buried near an existing pumping station and further elements installed parallel to the reservoir access road including a membrane filtration plant, a chlorination station and a chlorine gas scrubber.

== Geography ==
The reservoir is located in the hills of the north face of the Santa Monica Mountains, south of Encino neighborhood. The reservoir lies at 327 m above sea level. The surface area is 0.69 km^{2} and the drainage basin is 3.63 km^{2}. The reservoir is found on the United States Geological Survey topographic map Canoga Park area.

The reservoir's geology involves poorly consolidated and consolidated conglomerate sandstone and basalt.

The region of the Encino reservoir has a hot dry summer and a mild wet winter, Köppen climate classification Csa. Based on measurements taken between 1958 and 1978, the average annual rainfall at Encino Reservoir was 48 cm (19 inches). During the same period of study, the rate of evaporation which depends on temperature, wind and humidity, was an average of 120 cm (47.45 inches) per year. Due to this negative value, irrigation of farmland, golf courses and landscaping cannot depend on the Encino reservoir and must use Los Angeles City water instead.

== Management and risk ==
The reservoir is inspected yearly. In 2025, its condition is listed as satisfactory while its hazard potential classification is high. The "high" level means "failure or mis-operation will probably cause loss of human life".

The State of California has, since 1929, placed the management of the safety of dams with the Division of Safety of Dams (DoSD) within the California Department of Water Resources. The DoSD describes the risk of downstream hazard in the case of a dam breach as extremely high.

=== 1971 San Fernando earthquake ===
In the early hours of February 9, 1971, an earthquake began in the northern part of the San Fernando Valley. The Encino Reservoir was not damaged. Afterward, however, the reservoir's role in the supply of water during emergencies was examined closely. In 1972, three seismoscopes were installed at the reservoir, including at the crest and the west abutment.

=== 1994 Northridge earthquake ===
At 4.30 a.m. pacific time, January 17, the 1994 Northridge earthquake epicenter formed 7.2 km north of the Encino Reservoir. The ruptured fault plane was 17.7 km (11 miles) from the dam. The peak horizontal ground acceleration was 0.23 g which caused no significant damage to the Encino dam. There was some cracking of the asphalt concrete at the dam top and on a downstream access road.

== Uses ==
=== Fire-fighting ===
During 2025 Palisades Fire, the Encino reservoir was within one of the mandatory evacuation zones. However, it also played an integral part in fire-fighting efforts. Boeing CH-47 Chinooks were used to drop water onto the fire. The helicopters hover above the water of the reservoir. A flight mechanic in the rear of the helicopter lowers a 7m (23 feet) long retractable tube into the water. 11365 L (3000 gallons) of water are drawn into the helicopter tank to be dumped strategically on the fire.

=== Recreation ===
The Encino reservoir's recreational assets include walking trails, nature and wildlife areas such as the California scrub oak woodland.
