= Keeler House =

Notable residence in California

General information
- Client: Anne Keeler

Design and construction
- Architect(s): Ray Kappe

The Keeler House was a house in Pacific Palisades, Los Angeles. It was completed in 1991 to the designs of American architect Ray Kappe and was destroyed in the January 2025 Palisades Fire.

The house was designed in a Modernist style by Kappe for Anne Keeler, a jazz singer, and her husband Gordon Melcher. The couple had originally engaged another architect before they approached Kappe. Keeler was an admirer of Kappe's 1967 residence on Brooktree Road in Pacific Palisades. It was a remodelling of the extant residence on the site. The house was 4,142 sq ft in size with 4 bedrooms and 3 bathrooms. The walls and floors of the house were made from concrete; redwood, teak and fir woods were also used throughout the house. The house used a cantilevered post-and-beam construction that was one of the last of its kind, due to newer California seismic codes and Title 24 building efficiency standards. It was completed in 1991 with the construction having taken four and a half years.

In April 2024 the house was put up for sale for $12 million. It was destroyed in the January 2025 Southern California wildfires.

The house was located at 16525 Akron Street in the Pacific Palisades area of Los Angeles.
