= Friedrich Clemens Gerke Tower =

Coordinates: 53°51′26″N 8°40′40″E

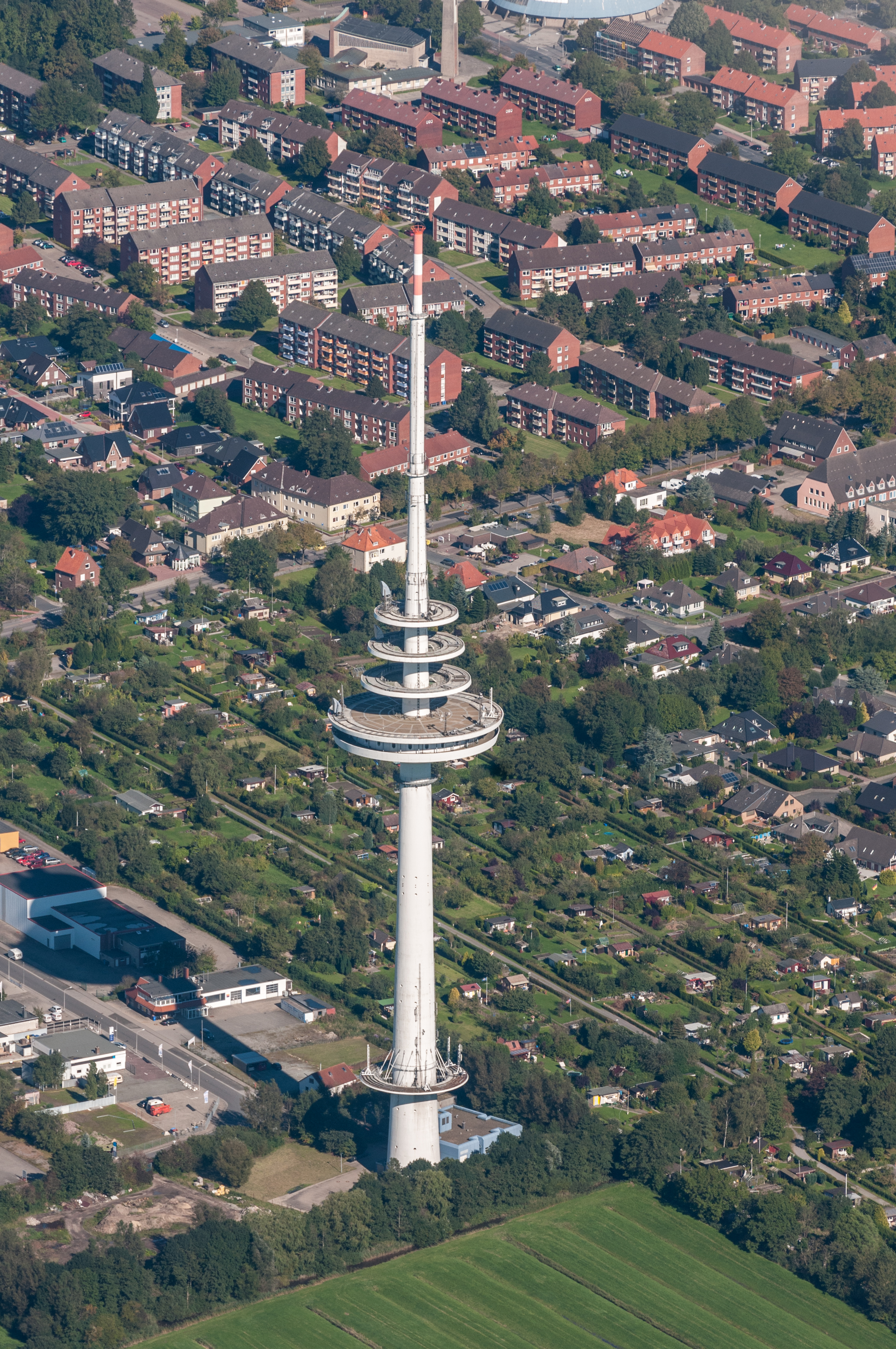
Friedrich-Clemens-Gerke Tower

Friedrich Clemens Gerke Tower is a 230-metre-tall (750 ft) telecommunication tower of reinforced concrete in Cuxhaven in Germany. Friedrich Clemens Gerke Tower, which is named after Friedrich Clemens Gerke, was completed in 1991 and is not accessible for tourists. In spite of its size, it is only used as receiving point for cable TV, as a radio relay station and as a mobile phone transmitter, but not for broadcasting. The tower was designed by architects Gerhard Kreisel, Dipl. Ing. and Günter H. Müller Dipl. Ing., Kiel.

== See also ==
- List of towers
