= Pacific Palisades Business Block =

Historic building in Los Angeles, California

Business Block building
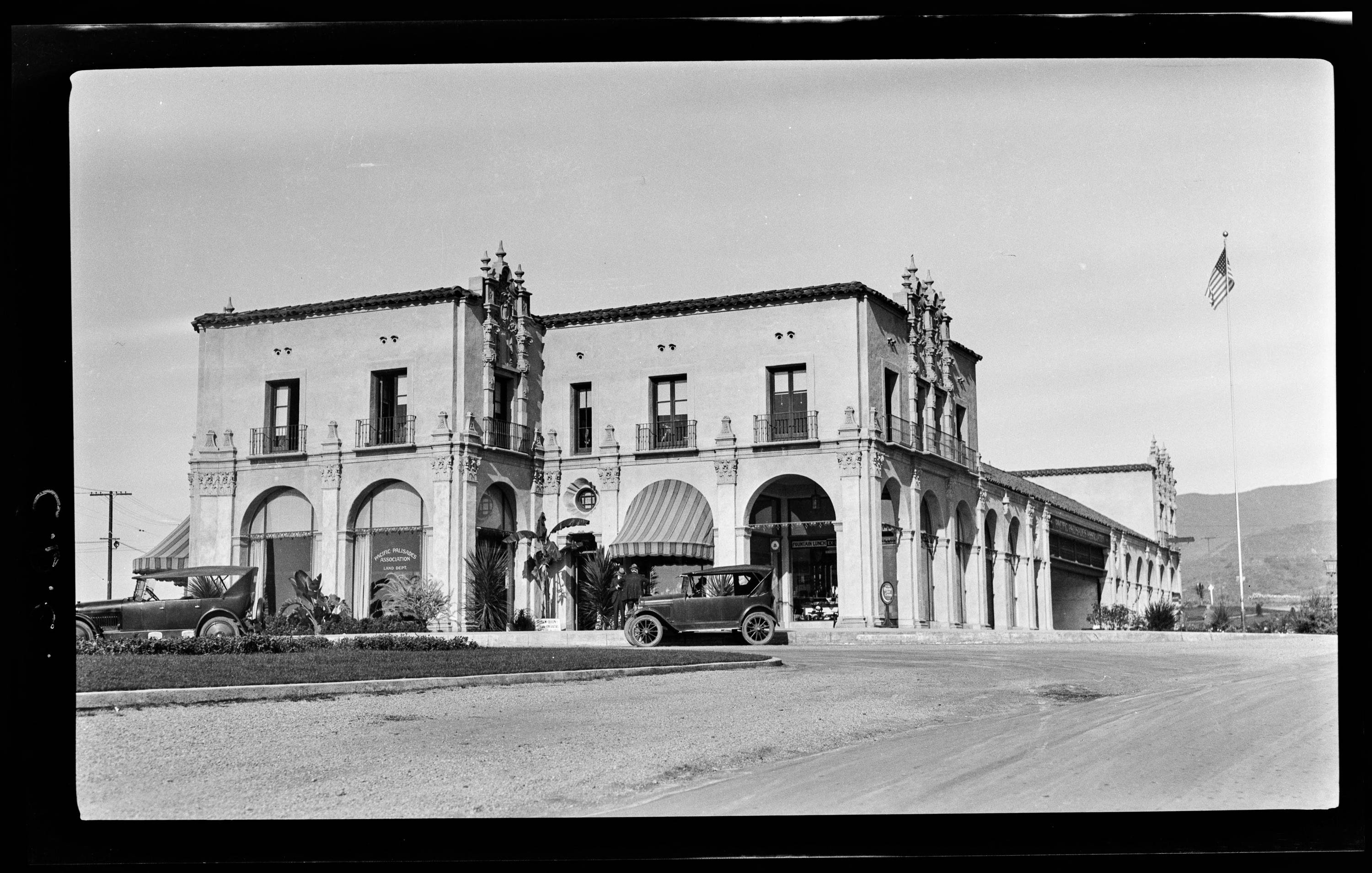
- Pacific Palisades business block c. 1925 (Ernest Marquez Collection, Huntington Library)

- Location within the Los Angeles metropolitan area Location within California Location within the United States

General information
- Status: Incinerated in the Palisades Fire
- Architectural style: Mission/spanish Revival
- Location: Pacific Palisades, California
- Coordinates: 34.0472°N 118.5261°W
- Destroyed: January 7, 2025

Technical details
- Floor area: 30,000 sq ft (2,800 m^{2})

Design and construction
- Architect: Clifton Nourse

Los Angeles Historic-Cultural Monument
- Designated: March 22, 2010

The Business Block Building was a historic building located in Pacific Palisades, California, that was designed by architect Clifton Nourse and dedicated in 1924. The building was 30,000 square feet (2,800 m^{2}) and sat on 36,000 square feet (3,300 m^{2}) of land. The Business Block building was located between Antioch, Swarthmore and Sunset in the Village neighborhood of Pacific Palisades, an area in the Westside of Los Angeles. It was destroyed by the Palisades Fire in January 2025.

== History ==
In 1925 photos of the building, there is a small park across the street on the other side of Swarthmore before a service station was built there years later. The park was eventually restored as the Village Green in 1973. This Spanish Colonial Revival-style structure has long benefited from the large adjacent parking lot below Via de la Paz as well as a deep setback in front of most of the building.

In 1982, real estate developer Rohit Joshi made a $4.5-million cash offer for the landmark building. Joshi said at the time that he intended to demolish the Business Block building to make way for a $22-million, three-story shopping mall with an underground parking garage. Joshi would later admit that he was unprepared for the massive uproar from local residents that ensued, which culminated in a massive rally on the Village Green which was organized by Joan Graves, wife of then Honorary Mayor Peter Graves. Mrs. Graves would later state, "We got most of the celebrities in the Palisades organized [including her husband Peter, and former honorary mayors of the Palisades including Ted Knight, Dom DeLuise, Walter Matthau and John Raitt], rented a big stage and closed Swarthmore for our rally. We had bands and singers, and speeches about why it was important to save the building—and we made it on the evening news!"

When Joshi ultimately backed out of the deal, Mrs. Graves and her supporters convinced the company TOPA Management to purchase the aging structure in 1983, bring it up to state earthquake standards and give it a new paint job. The following year the Business Block building was officially rededicated and was declared a City of Los Angeles Historic Cultural Monument.

=== 2020s ===
In 2020, architects working on behalf of the building's owner, TOPA Management, offered their design plan for a renovation of the building that would include painting it white with black awnings, from its original pink with green awnings. This concept did not go over well with residents across the community.

By 2024, the building held a Starbucks coffee shop location, a local Italian restaurant, the original location of the popular Cafe Vida, and was preparing to welcome two new businesses.

The Historic Pacific Palisades Business Block was destroyed in the 2025 Palisades Fire.
