= Tianjin Radio and Television Tower =

Communication tower in Tianjin, China

Coordinates: 39°5′31″N 117°10′30″E

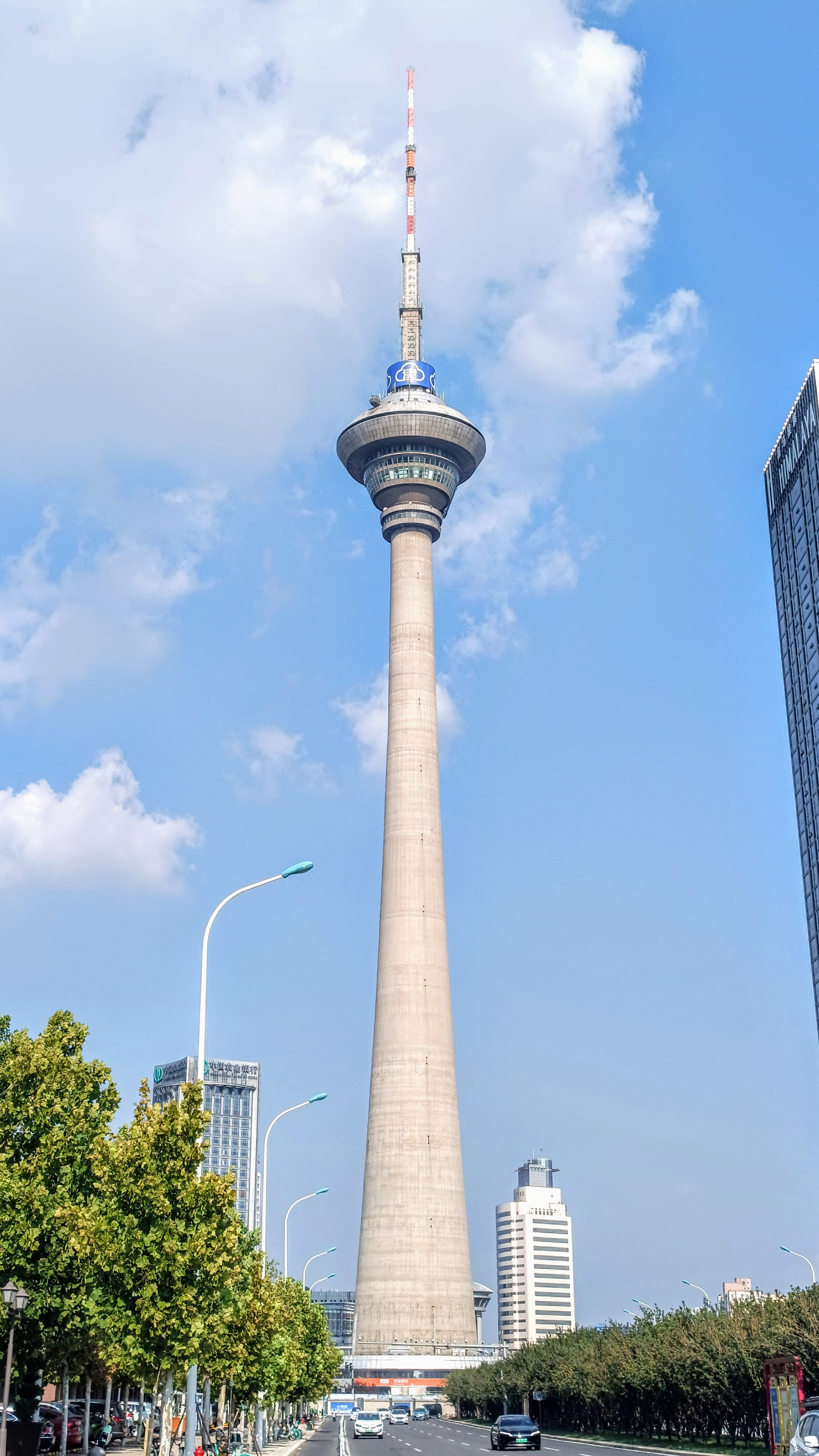
Tianjin TV Tower

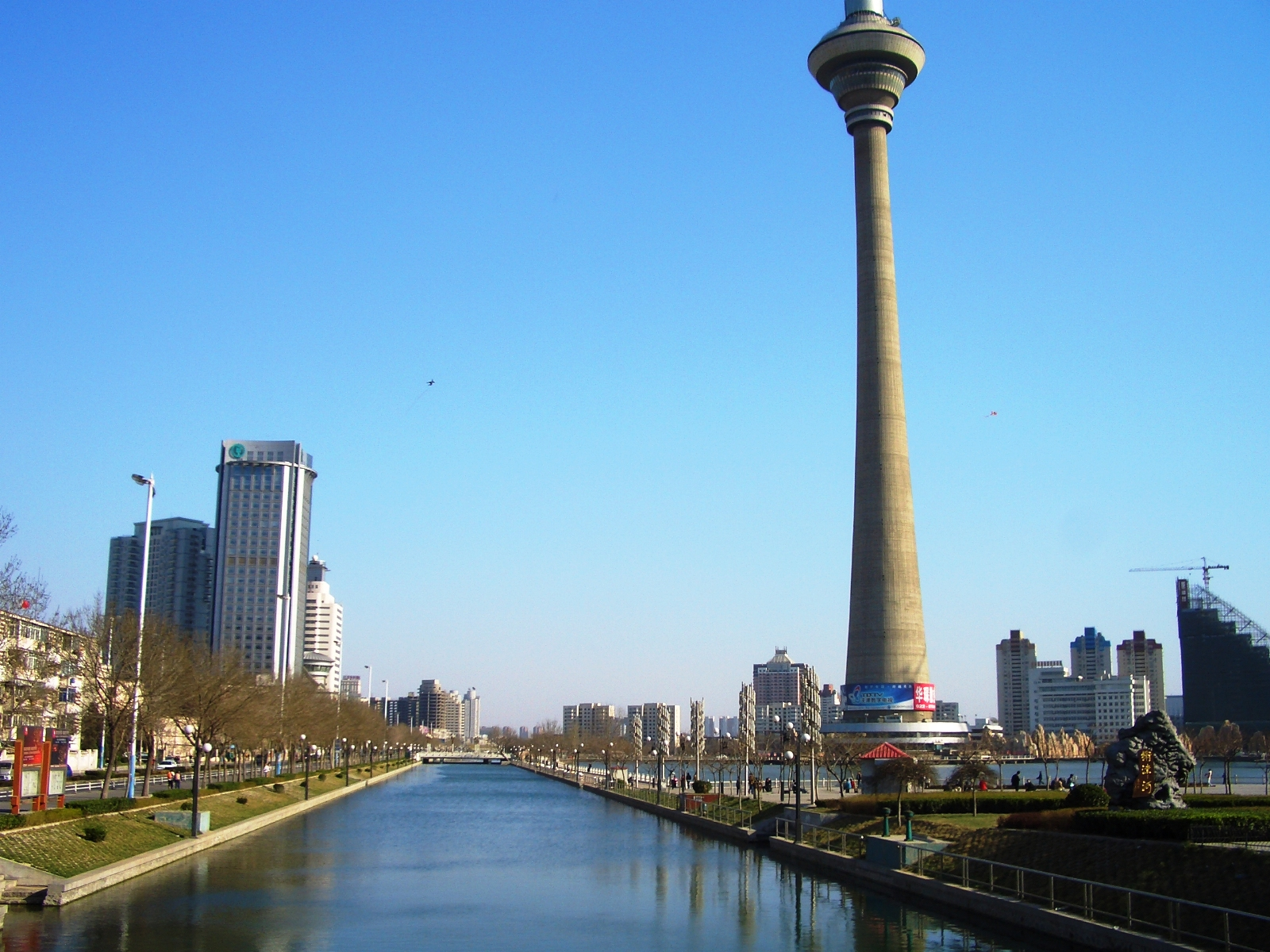
A view of the Tianjin TV Tower and the surrounding grounds

The Tianjin Radio and Television Tower is a 415.2-meter-tall (1,362 ft) tower in Tianjin, China, used primarily for communication. It is the 8th tallest freestanding tower in the world. It was built in 1991 at a cost of $45 million. Approximately two-thirds of the way up the tower is an observation pod with 253 square meters (2,720 sq ft) of floor space (used mostly for communication equipment). It is a member of the World Federation of Great Towers.

== See also ==
- List of towers
- List of tallest freestanding structures in the world
- Fernsehturm Stuttgart – first TV tower built from concrete and prototype
