= Palisades Charter Elementary School =

Public, charter school in California, US

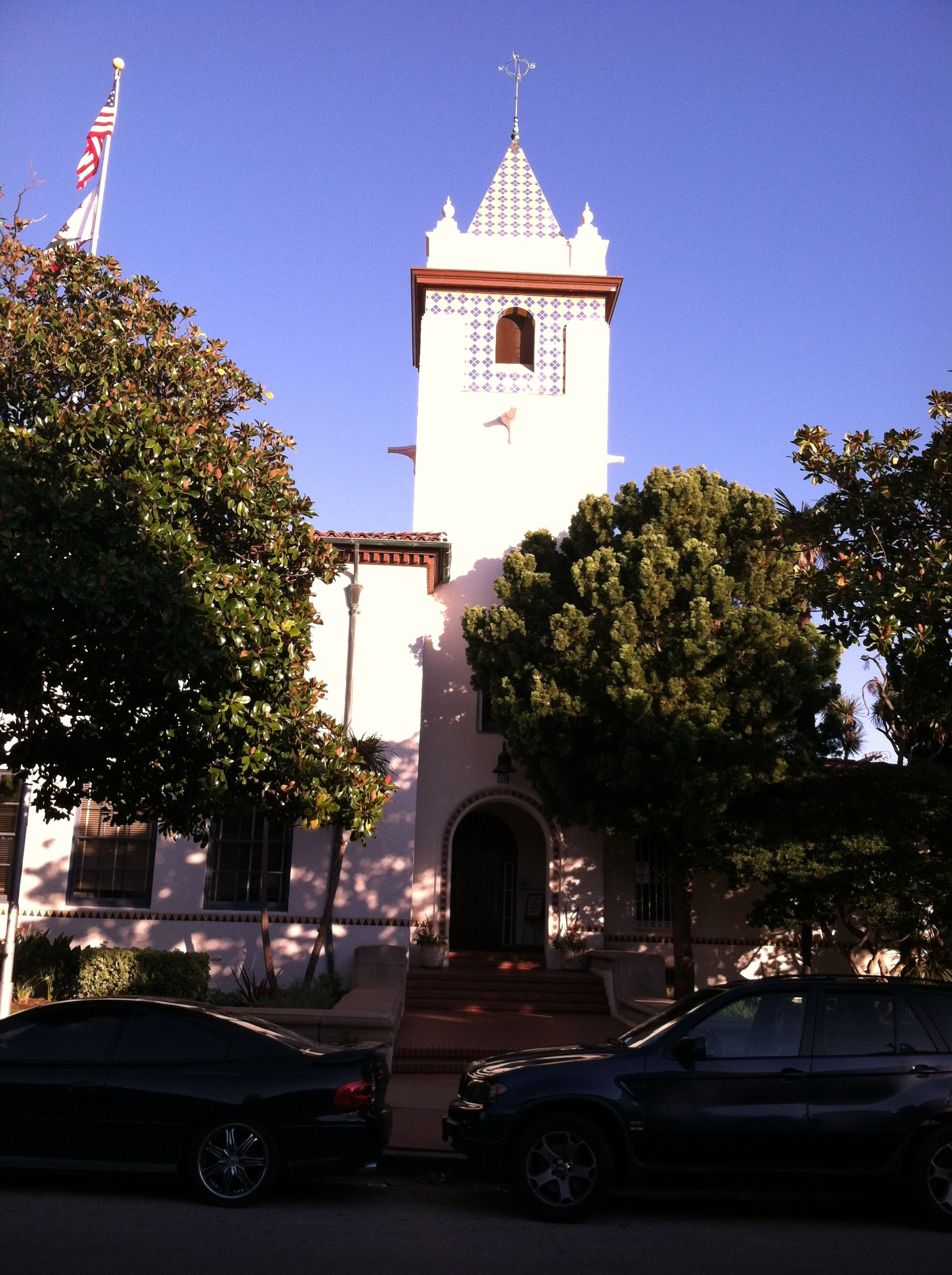

Location
- 800 Vía De La Paz; Pacific Palisades, Los Angeles, California 90272; United States; 34°02′43″N 118°31′38″W

Information
- Other names: Palisades Elementary School
- Type: Public, charter
- Established: 1922
- School district: Los Angeles Unified School District
- Principal: Juliet Herman
- Gender: Coeducational
- Website: palisadesces.lausd.org

Palisades Elementary Charter School (known colloquially as Pali Elem) is an elementary charter school in Pacific Palisades, California, part of the Los Angeles Unified School District.

Also known as Palisades Elementary and Palisades Charter Elementary, the school opened in 1922. The historic administration building, designed in Spanish Colonial Revival style, was built in 1930. The architect was Alfred S. Nibecker, Jr. Palisades Elementary became a charter school in 1993.

As of 2023, the school serves K-5, with the student population of the school is ~ 400. As of 2023, the school employed ~ 20 full-time teachers. As of 2024, Juliet Herman is the Principal of the school.

After the 1971 San Fernando earthquake, the school and its Moorish tower were slated for demolition due to the structure not meeting modern day safety standards. The citizens of Pacific Palisades, proud of the architecture of the building, hired an architect who designed a plan to modernize the building without knocking it down.

The school was heavily damaged in the Palisades Fire of 2025, with all bungalow classroom buildings burning down. After the fires, the LAUSD temporarily moved the Palisades Elementary students to the Brentwood Science Magnet Elementary School so they could continue classes. In July 2026, LAUSD officials announced that the school was on track to begin construction in the fourth quarter of 2026. The $134.9 million dollar building project is expected to be completed by the third quarter of 2028.
