= Pacific Palisades, Los Angeles =

Neighborhood in California, US

Pacific Palisades
- Neighborhood
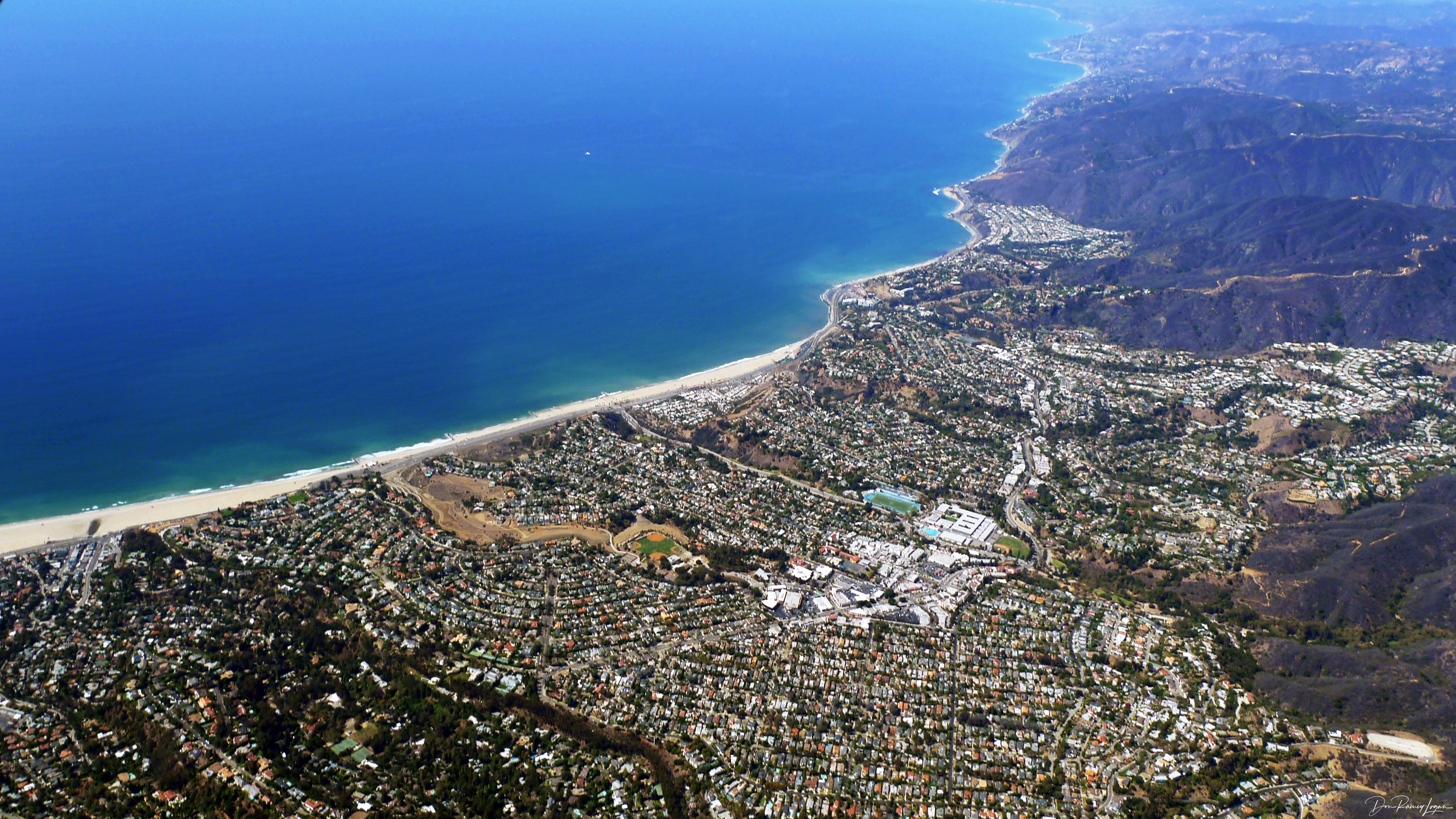
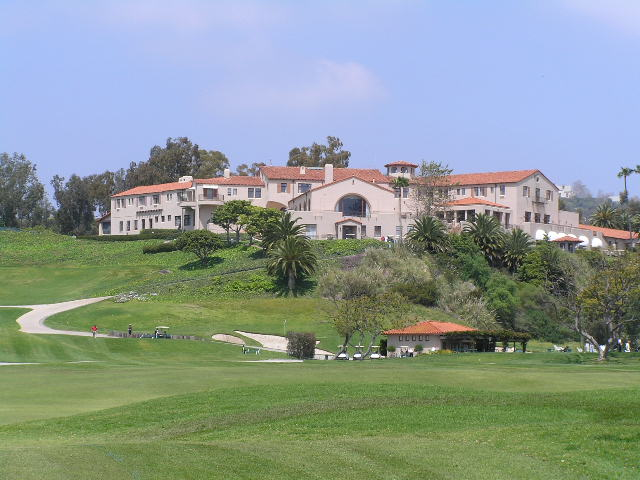
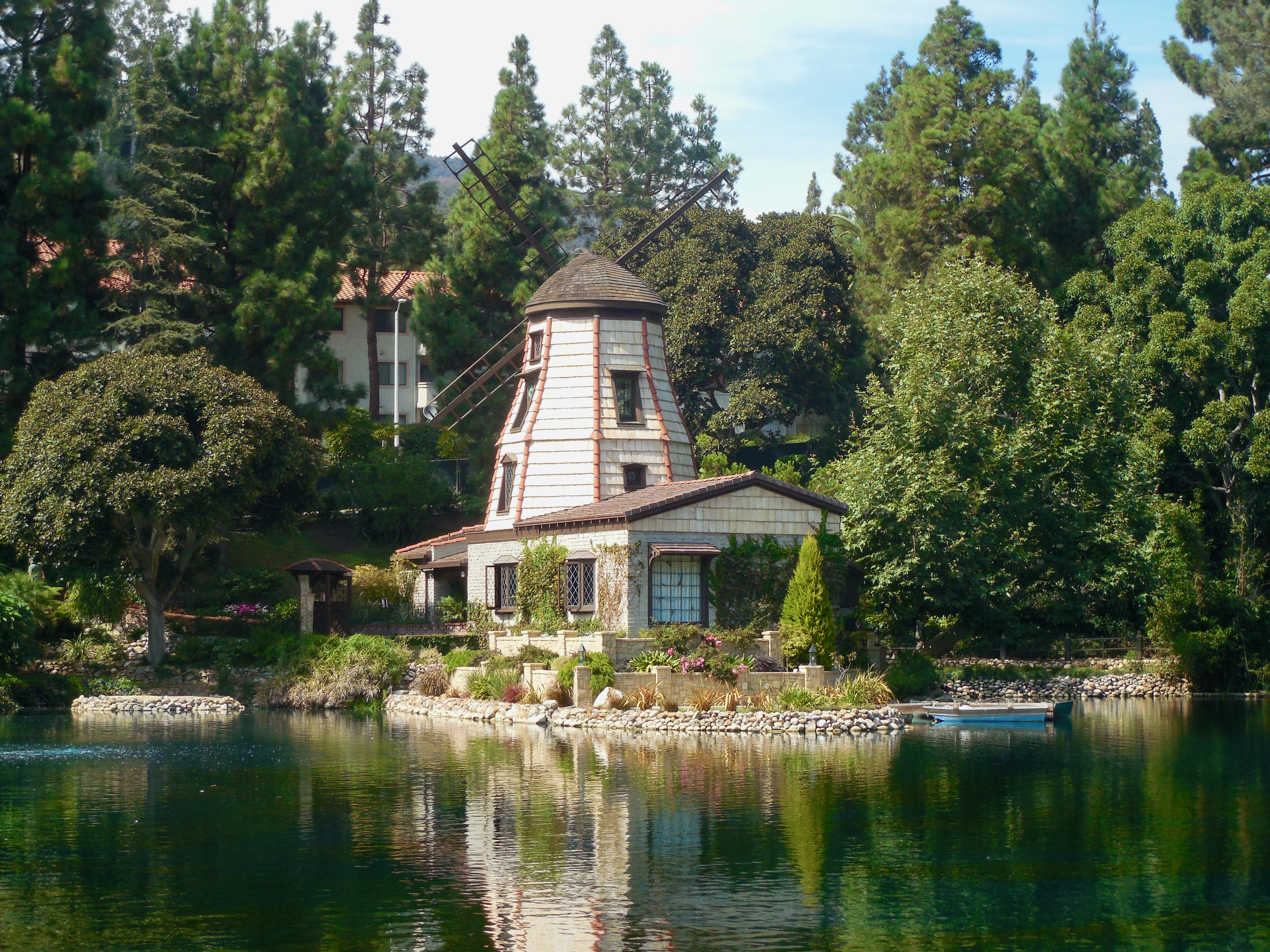
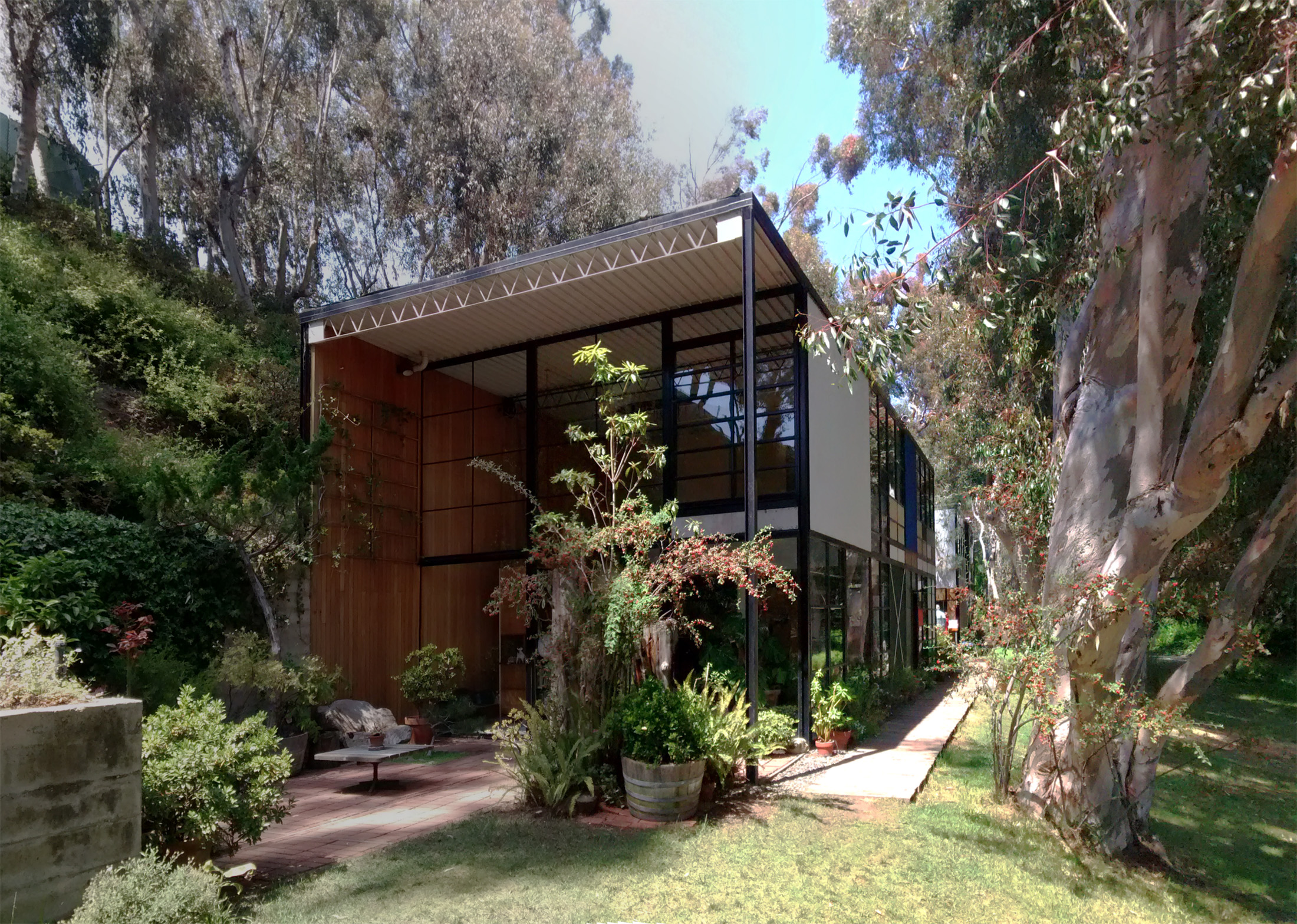
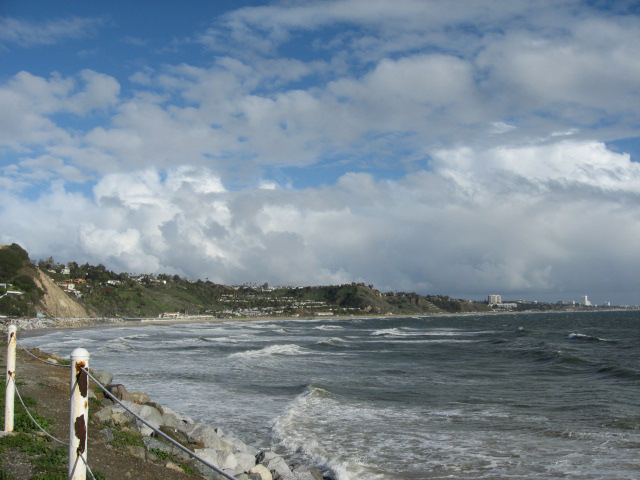
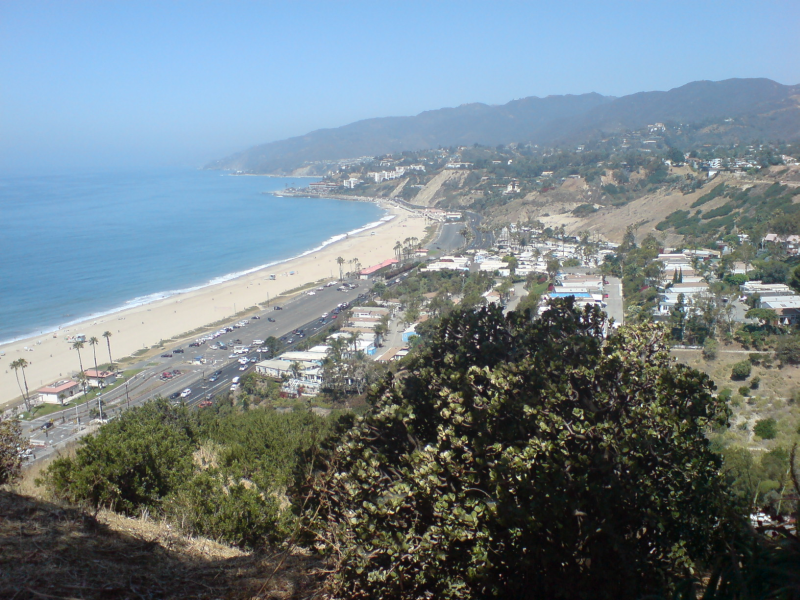
- Pacific Palisades and Will Rogers State Beach, California

- Flag
- Motto: "Where the mountains meet the sea."
- Location within Los Angeles–Long Beach–Anaheim, CA MSA
- Coordinates: 34°02′53″N 118°31′37″W
- Country: United States
- State: California
- County: Los Angeles
- City: Los Angeles
- First settlement by Chumash people: 8,000 BC
- Mexican settlement: 1838
- Established: 1921

Government
  - Type: Neighborhood of Los Angeles
  - Honorary mayor: Ted McGinley and Gigi Rice https://palipost.com/ted-mcginley-gigi-rice-to-serve-as-co-honorary-mayors/

Area
  - Total: 24.31 sq mi (62.97 km^{2})
  - Land: 22.84 sq mi (59.15 km^{2})
  - Water: 1.5 sq mi (3.8 km^{2})
- Elevation: 323 ft (98.5 m)
- Highest elevation: 2,126 ft (648 m)
- Lowest elevation: 0 ft (0 m)

Population (2023)
  - Total: 23,648
  - Density: 1,185/sq mi (457.5/km^{2})
- Demonym(s): Palisadian, Palisadians
- Time zone: UTC-8 (Pacific)
  - Summer (DST): UTC-7 (PDT)
- ZIP Code: 90272
- Area codes: 310 and 424
- Website: Community Council; Chamber of Commerce

Pacific Palisades is a neighborhood in the Westside region of the city of Los Angeles, California, situated about 20 miles (32 km) west of downtown. It was founded in 1921 by a Methodist organization, and is known for its seclusion, Mediterranean climate, hilly topography, abundance of parkland and hiking trails, a 3-mile (4.8 km) strip of coastline, and for being home to several architecturally significant homes.

The neighborhood is bounded by Brentwood to the east, the unincorporated community of Topanga to the west, Santa Monica to the southeast, the Santa Monica Bay to the southwest, and the Santa Monica Mountains to the north. Parks and beaches in the Palisades include the Santa Monica State Beach, Will Rogers State Beach, Santa Monica Mountains National Recreation Area, and Will Rogers State Historic Park.

In January 2025, thousands of structures were destroyed by the Palisades Fire, amounting to several billion dollars in damages, as part of the wider outbreak of Southern California wildfires.

== History ==
=== Native American period ===
Archeological evidence shows Native American Indians living in the Santa Monica Mountains and the surrounding area including Pacific Palisades for over 10,000 years. Prior to European contact, the western sections of the Santa Monica mountains were inhabited by the Tongva people. The closest Tongva settlement to Pacific Palisades with a written record is the village of Topa'nga. The village of Topa'nga sits on the westernmost edge of Tongva territory, neighboring the territory of the Chumash people to the north. Due to this close proximity to the Chumash, the culture in western Tongva territory contained elements of Chumash influence.

=== Mexican period ===
During the period of Mexican rule of California, the land that became Pacific Palisades belonged to Rancho Boca de Santa Monica, granted by the governor of California to Francisco Marquez and Ysidro Reyes in 1839. The Ysidro Reyes Adobe was the first adobe home ever built in Santa Monica Canyon, erected in the year 1838 on land now known as Pampas Ricas Blvd in Pacific Palisades. Sketches of adobe dwelling exist in the collection of the UCLA Library. A memorial plaque sits in a boulder on Pampas Ricas Blvd commemorating the adobe house, dedicated in the 1950s. Ysidro Reyes died in 1863. Reyes left his portion of Rancho Boca de Santa Monica to his widow, Maria Antonia Villa, who sold it to developer and railroad magnate Robert Symington Baker in 1875.

=== 1911–1922: Inceville and Hartville ===
In 1911, film director Thomas Ince constructed his historic film studio Inceville on a 460-acre (1.9 km^{2}) tract of land he leased called Bison Ranch at Sunset Boulevard and Pacific Coast Highway in the Santa Monica Mountains. Today this is where the Self-Realization Fellowship Lake Shrine is located, a Pacific Palisades landmark. By the following year, Ince had earned enough money to purchase the ranch and was able to lease an additional 18,000 acres (73 km^{2}) lot in what is now in the Palisades Highlands neighborhood, stretching 7.5 miles (12.1 km) up Santa Ynez Canyon. This was the first major development built in the Palisades since the Mexican rancho era.

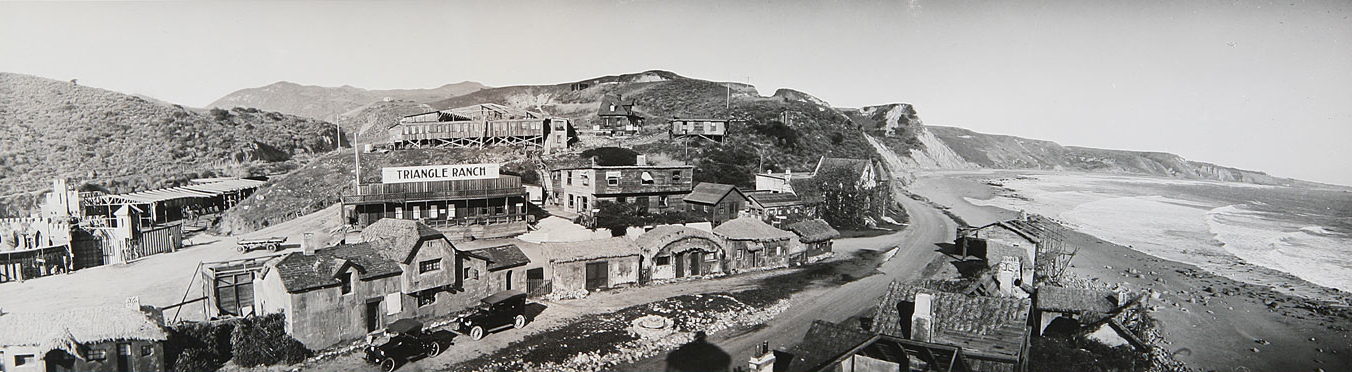
"Inceville", Santa Ynez Canyon, California, c. 1919

This was the first studio in the area which featured silent stages, production offices, printing labs, a commissary large enough to serve lunch to hundreds of workers, dressing rooms, props houses, elaborate sets, all in one central location.

When Inceville was completed, the streets were lined with many types of structures, from humble cottages to mansions, mimicking the style and architecture of different countries. Extensive outdoor western sets were built and used on the site for several years. According to Katherine La Hue in her book, Pacific Palisades: Where the Mountains Meet the Sea:

Ince invested $35,000 in building, stages and sets ... a bit of Switzerland, a Puritan settlement, a Japanese village ... beyond the breakers, an ancient brigantine weighed anchor, cutlassed men swarming over the sides of the ship, while on the shore performing cowboys galloped about, twirling their lassos in pursuit of errant cattle ... The main herds were kept in the hills, where Ince also raised feed and garden produce. Supplies of every sort were needed to house and feed a veritable army of actors, directors and subordinates.

While the cowboys, Native Americans and assorted workers lived at Inceville, the main actors came from Los Angeles and other communities as needed, often taking the red trolley cars to the Long Wharf in what is now the Temescal Canyon neighborhood, where buckboards conveyed them to the set.

Ince lived in a house overlooking the vast studio in what is now the Marquez Knolls neighborhood. Indeed, "Inceville" became a prototype for Hollywood film studios of the future, with a studio head (Ince), producers, directors, production managers, production staff, and writers all working together under one organization and under the supervision of a General Manager, Fred J. Balshofer.

On January 16, 1916, a fire broke out at Inceville, the first of many that eventually destroyed all of the buildings. Ince later gave up on the studio and sold it to William S. Hart, who renamed it Hartville. Three years later, Hart sold the lot to Robertson-Cole Pictures Corporation, which continued filming there until 1922. La Hue writes that the place was virtually a ghost town when the last remnants of Inceville were burned on July 4, 1922, leaving only a "weatherworn old church, which stood sentinel over the charred ruins."

=== 1921–1931: Methodist Episcopal Church ===
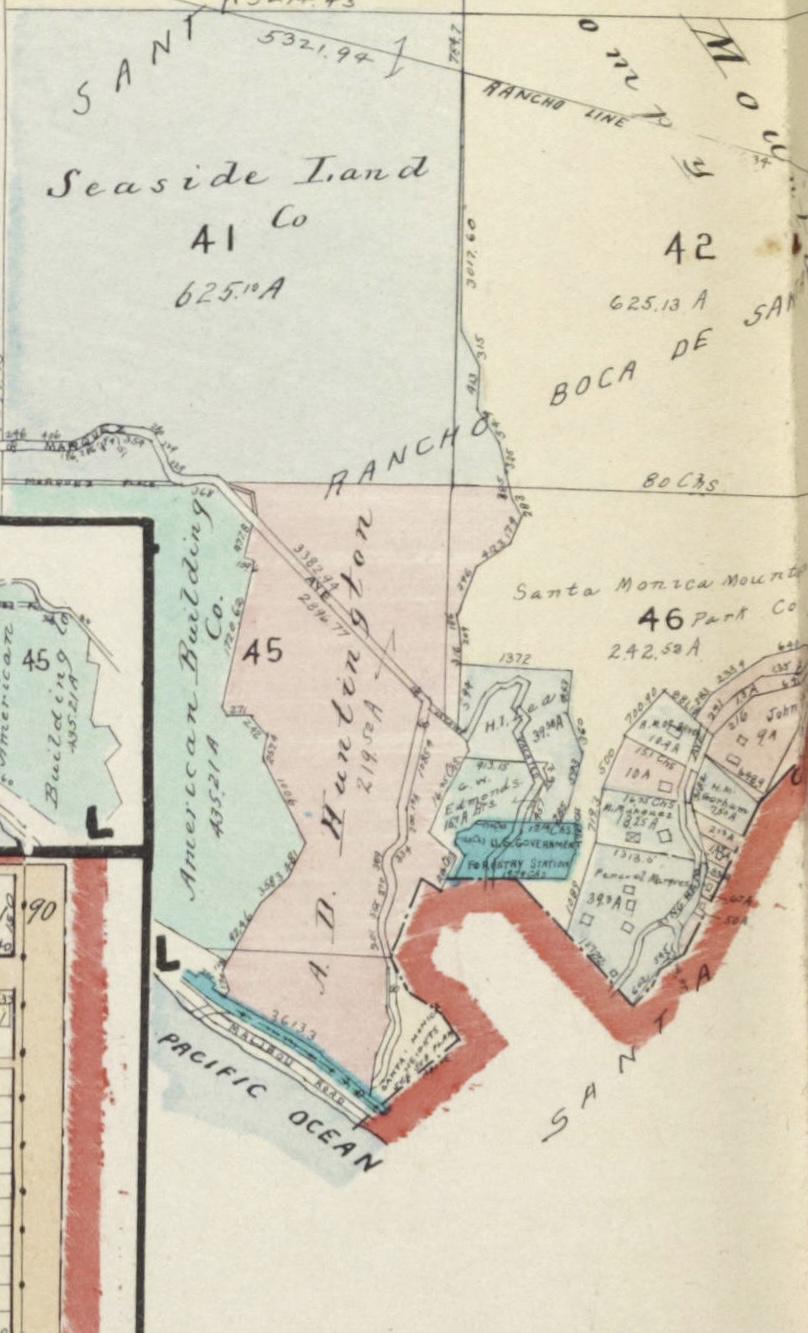
Santa Monica Canyon, 1921

A decade later, the Rev. Charles H. Scott and the Southern California Methodist Episcopal Church bought the land; in 1922, Scott founded Pacific Palisades, envisioning an elaborate religious-intellectual commune. Believers snapped up choice lots and lived in tents during construction. By 1925, the Palisades had 100 homes. In one subdivision, streets were named in alphabetical order for Methodist missionaries (the "Alphabet Streets"). The tents eventually were replaced by cabins, then by bungalows, and ultimately by multimillion-dollar homes. The climate of the area was a big selling point. Temperatures are much cooler than inland Los Angeles during summer, but usually sunnier and less foggy than areas south along the coast (e.g. Santa Monica).

The name "Pacific Palisades" comes from the term for a tall wooden fence or defensive wall, by analogy with the cliff-like bluffs situated on the western side of the neighborhood bordered by the Pacific Ocean. These bluffs were said to resemble those in the Palisades section of New Jersey, on the western side of the lower Hudson River.

Pacific Palisades enjoyed steady growth throughout the Roaring 20s. The paving of Sunset Boulevard in 1925 brought an increased flow of traffic through the community and offered more convenient access to nearby Westwood and Beverly Hills.

In 1928, the Los Angeles Police Department began renting temporary office space in the now-historic Business Block building for the price of $10 a month. The following year, a motorcycle officer was assigned to make nightly patrols in the area. The Palisades finally acquired its own fire station in 1929, located on Sunset, adjacent to where the local Chase Bank branch now stands in the Village neighborhood.

By 1929 the town consisted of about 365 homes with about 1,000 residents, who mostly resided in the "Alphabet Streets" neighborhood, although residential construction was now expanding into what would later become the Castellammare, Huntington and Paseo Miramar neighborhoods. On August 18 of that year, the cornerstone was laid for the foundation of the Methodist Episcopal Church on Via de la Paz, which at that time was the community's only church. Directly across the street, planning was underway for the town's first permanent school building which would later become known as "Palisades Elementary", which was dedicated on June 12, 1931.

By the end of the decade, nearly all remaining open areas of Pacific Palisades were being developed, reflecting the period's booming growth and the Palisades' coastal allure. Golfers were already enjoying the Riviera Country Club, opened in 1927, and the Bel-Air Bay Club opened in March 1930.

=== 1930–present ===
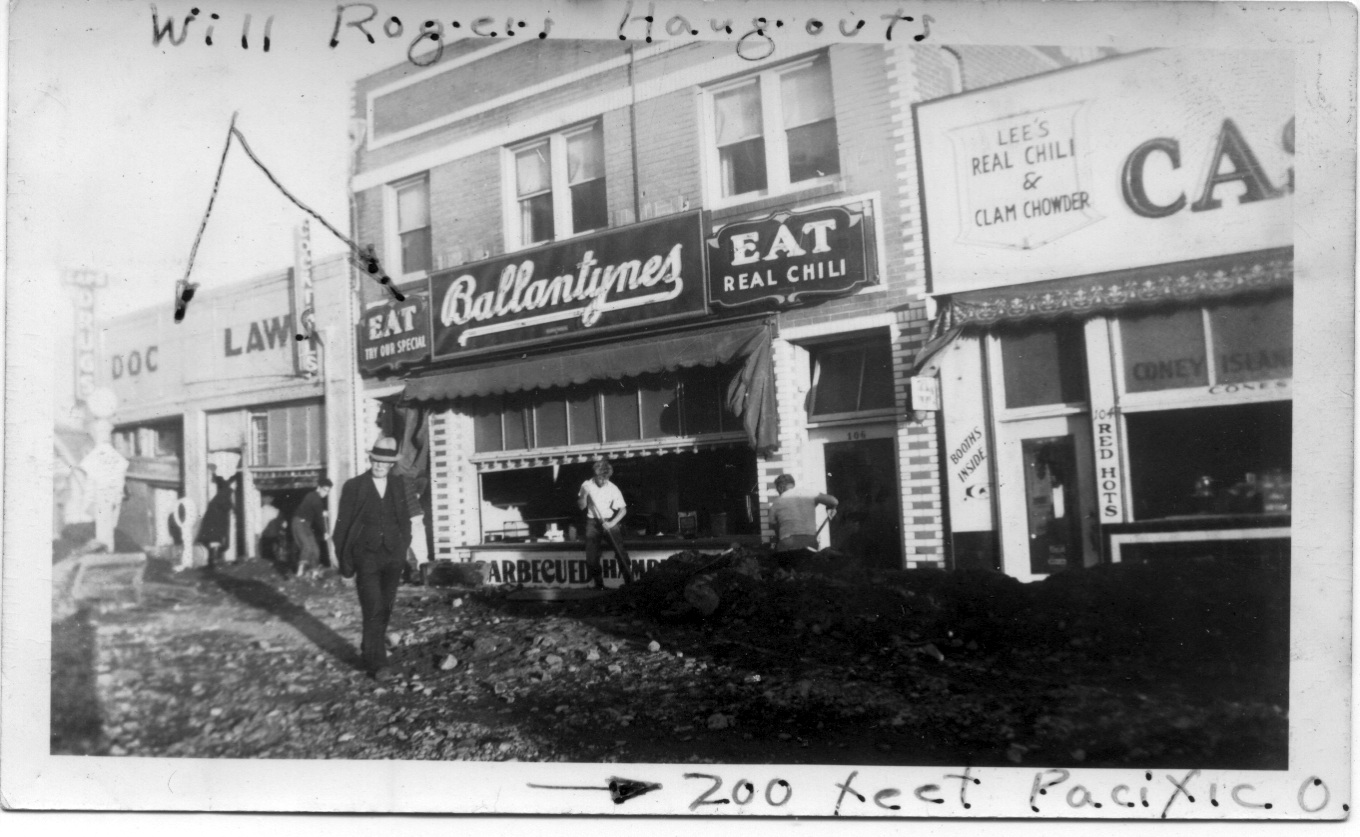
Photo of the devastation from the 1938 flood in what is now The Village

During the 1930s and 40s, the Palisades attracted German, German-Jewish and Austrian-Jewish intellectuals and artists fleeing from Hitler’s Holocaust, including associated with the Exilliteratur literary movement, such as Thomas Mann, Lion Feuchtwanger, Theodor W. Adorno, Vicki Baum, Herbert Zipper, and Emil Ludwig. Some of these exiles had previously sought refuge in the south of France, but fled to the United States after the fall of France. They were surprised by the similarities with the Mediterranean climate and topography. Villa Aurora on Paseo Miramar, the Spanish colonial home of Feuchtwanger and his wife, Marta, became the focal point of the expatriate community, which was nicknamed "Weimar by the Sea". Some non-Jewish exiles who were married to people with Jewish ancestry chose to settle in the Palisades as well, such as Thomas Mann and his wife Katia Mann who resided at 1550 San Remo Drive in the Riviera neighborhood.

For many decades there was a virtual ban on the sale of alcoholic beverages in the district, and a Chinese restaurant, House of Lee, held the only liquor license. The Methodist Church created a Chautauqua Conference Grounds in Temescal Canyon. The Presbyterian Synod purchased the property in 1943 and used it as a private retreat center until the Santa Monica Mountains Conservancy purchased the property in 1994 to become Temescal Gateway Park.

Though the Palisades had a notable Jewish population since at least the 1930s, it was still largely Methodist until the 1970s. This is when the Palisades began to see an increase in affluent Jewish migration. Mort's Deli,, opened in 1972; it closed in 2007.

In 2021, a wildfire destroyed about 1,200 acres (490 ha) in Pacific Palisades and an arson suspect was detained.

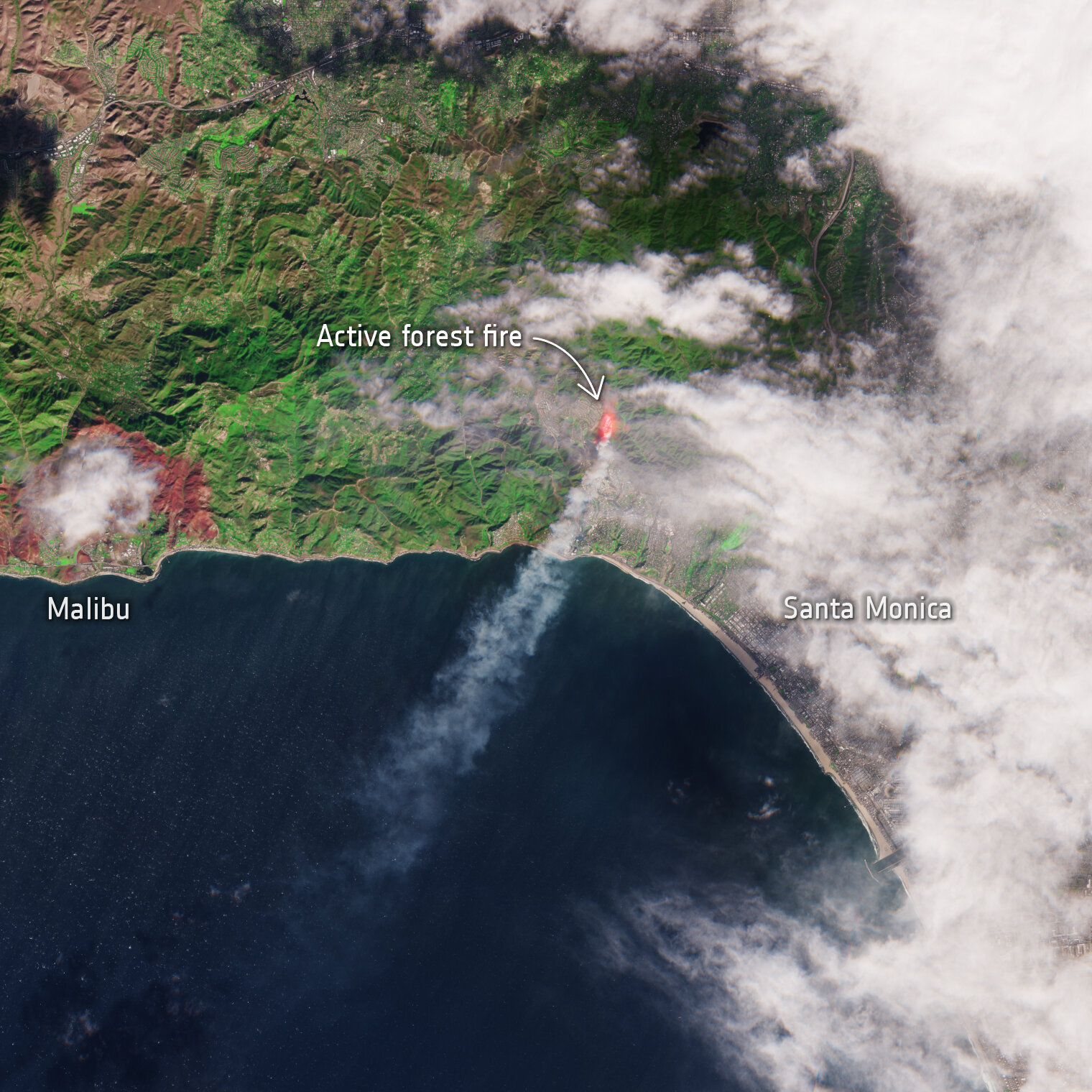
Satellite image of the 2025 Palisades Fire minutes after ignition

On January 7, 2025, the Palisades Fire began north of Bienveneda Ave. The fire was propelled at a rapid rate of spread due to extremely high Santa Ana Winds and critically dry brush. The fire quickly spread through the Palisades and neighboring communities before being fully contained on January 31. The fire destroyed 6,831 structures, damaged 973 structures, injured 3 civilians, 1 firefighter, and killed 12 civilians. It is the tenth-deadliest and third-most destructive California wildfire on record and the second most destructive to occur in the history of the city of Los Angeles.

Affected area of Pacific Palisades by Palisades Fire (map data)

== Geography ==
Pacific Palisades is located about 7 miles (11 kilometers) west of the UCLA campus. The Santa Monica Mountain range runs through the northern and eastern sections of Pacific Palisades, accessible through a series of trailheads.

Pacific Palisades covers a total area of 24.31 square miles (63 km^{2}), comprising 22.84 square miles (59.2 km^{2}) of land and 1.47 square miles (3.8 km^{2}) of water. The Palisades coast is about three miles (4.8 km) in length.

=== Climate ===
Pacific Palisades

Climate chart (precipitation, max. and min. temperature)
J	F	M	A	M	J	J	A	S	O	N	D
1.6 66 52	1.5 65 50	1 67 52	0.4 69 54	0.4 71 56	0.1 74 59	0.2 79 63	0.1 81 65	0.2 81 65	0.2 77 62	0.4 71 57	1.1 64 51
- █ Average max. and min. temperatures in °F
- █ Precipitation totals in inches
Metric conversion
J	F	M	A	M	J	J	A	S	O	N	D
41 19 11	38 18 10	25 19 11	10 21 12	10 22 13	2.5 23 15	5.1 26 17	2.5 27 18	5.1 27 18	5.1 25 17	10 22 14	28 18 11
- █ Average max. and min. temperatures in °C
- █ Precipitation totals in mm

Pacific Palisades has a Mediterranean climate (Köppen Csb), and receives just enough annual precipitation to avoid semi-arid climate (BSh),. Daytime temperatures are generally temperate all year round. In winter, they average around 68 °F (20 °C) giving it a tropical feel although it is a few degrees too cool to be a true tropical climate on average due to cool night temperatures. Pacific Palisades has plenty of sunshine throughout the year, with an average of only 35 days with measurable precipitation annually.

Temperatures in the Palisades exceed 90 °F (32 °C) on a dozen or so days in the year, from one day a month in April, May, June and November to three days a month in July, August, October and to five days in September. The average annual temperature of the sea is 63 °F (17 °C), from 58 °F (14 °C) in January to 68 °F (20 °C) in August. Hours of sunshine total more than 3,000 per year, from an average of 7 hours of sunshine per day in December to an average of 12 in July. Pacific Palisades, like much of the rest of the southern California coast, is subject to a late spring/early summer weather phenomenon called "June Gloom". This involves overcast or foggy skies in the morning that yield to sun by early afternoon.

Pacific Palisades averages 14.93 in (379 mm) of precipitation annually, mainly occurring between November and March, generally in the form of moderate rain showers, but sometimes as heavy rainfall during winter storms. Rainfall is usually higher in the neighborhoods located in the hills and coastal slopes of the Santa Monica Mountains, such as the Highlands and Castellammare; due to orographic uplift. Summer days are typically rainless. Rarely, an incursion of moist air from the south or east can bring brief thunderstorms in late summer, especially to the mountains. The coast gets slightly less rainfall, while the inland and mountain areas get considerably more. Years of average rainfall are rare. The usual pattern is year to year variability, with a short string of dry years of 5–10 in (130–250 mm) rainfall, followed by one or two wet years with more than 20 in (510 mm). Wet years are usually associated with warm water El Niño conditions in the Pacific, dry years with cooler water La Niña episodes. A series of rainy days can bring floods to the lowlands and mudslides to the hills, especially after wildfires have denuded the slopes.

Both freezing temperatures and snowfall are extremely rare in the hills and canyon ridges and along the coast, with the last occurrence of a 32 °F (0 °C) reading being on. While the most recent snowfall occurred in January 2021, it has also occurred several other times in recorded history, the second-most recent being in February 2019, with snow falling in some areas of the Palisades as recently as January 2021. At the official downtown station, the highest recorded temperature is 113 °F (45 °C) on September 27, 2010, while the lowest is 28 °F (−2 °C), on January 4, 1949. During autumn and winter, Santa Ana winds sometimes bring much warmer and drier conditions to Pacific Palisades, and raise wildfire risk.

Climate data for Pacific Palisades, California
Month	Jan	Feb	Mar	Apr	May	Jun	Jul	Aug	Sep	Oct	Nov	Dec	Year
Record high °F (°C)	88 (31)	92 (33)	95 (35)	102 (39)	97 (36)	104 (40)	97 (36)	98 (37)	110 (43)	106 (41)	101 (38)	94 (34)	110 (43)
Mean daily maximum °F (°C)	66 (19)	67 (19)	67 (19)	70 (21)	71 (22)	75 (24)	79 (26)	80 (27)	79 (26)	76 (24)	70 (21)	67 (19)	72 (22)
Mean daily minimum °F (°C)	48 (9)	49 (9)	50 (10)	52 (11)	55 (13)	58 (14)	61 (16)	62 (17)	61 (16)	57 (14)	52 (11)	49 (9)	55 (13)
Record low °F (°C)	27 (−3)	34 (1)	37 (3)	43 (6)	45 (7)	48 (9)	52 (11)	51 (11)	47 (8)	43 (6)	38 (3)	32 (0)	27 (−3)
Average precipitation inches (mm)	3.41 (87)	3.69 (94)	2.86 (73)	0.65 (17)	0.27 (6.9)	0.04 (1.0)	0.02 (0.51)	0.13 (3.3)	0.21 (5.3)	0.41 (10)	1.14 (29)	1.98 (50)	14.83 (377)
Source 1:
Source 2:

Hottest and coldest, wettest and driest averages for a month (°F/inch and °C/mm), 1895–2019
Month	Jan	Feb	Mar	Apr	May	Jun	Jul	Aug	Sep	Oct	Nov	Dec
Hottest	63.9 °F (17.7 °C)	64.2 °F (17.9 °C)	67.5 °F (19.7 °C)	68.2 °F (20.1 °C)	71.5 °F (21.9 °C)	75.9 °F (24.4 °C)	79.8 °F (26.6 °C)	79.0 °F (26.1 °C)	80.3 °F (26.8 °C)	75.4 °F (24.1 °C)	66.9 °F (19.4 °C)	62.2 °F (16.8 °C)
Coldest	46.7 °F (8.2 °C)	51.1 °F (10.6 °C)	52.0 °F (11.1 °C)	55.2 °F (12.9 °C)	57.2 °F (14.0 °C)	62.9 °F (17.2 °C)	66.2 °F (19.0 °C)	66.3 °F (19.1 °C)	63.1 °F (17.3 °C)	57.8 °F (14.3 °C)	55.2 °F (12.9 °C)	49.4 °F (9.7 °C)
Wettest	14.43 in (367 mm)	15.23 in (387 mm)	10.44 in (265 mm)	7.31 in (186 mm)	3.83 in (97 mm)	0.98 in (25 mm)	0.43 in (11 mm)	2.54 in (65 mm)	5.13 in (130 mm)	5.13 in (130 mm)	9.96 in (253 mm)	11.46 in (291 mm)
Driest	0 in (0 mm)	0 in (0 mm)	0 in (0 mm)	0 in (0 mm)	0 in (0 mm)	0 in (0 mm)	0 in (0 mm)	0 in (0 mm)	0 in (0 mm)	0 in (0 mm)	0 in (0 mm)	0 in (0 mm)

== Neighborhoods ==
=== The Village ===
The Village is Pacific Palisades' small central business district with its center at Sunset Boulevard and Via de la Paz, known for an abundance of Italian restaurants. The Village's anchor is the Palisades Village, a shopping center which was opened in 2018 and replaced a number of buildings in the downtown area. This business district is centered around the historic Business Block building located between Antioch and Sunset. The Village consists of a weekly farmers' market, restaurants, and a coffee shop in addition to shops, and offices.

=== The Alphabet Streets ===
The Alphabet Streets, also known as "The North Village", is the neighborhood that borders the 'village' proper to the north of Sunset Boulevard. This was the first neighborhood to be built in Pacific Palisades, beginning in 1921 by members of the Methodist movement. This neighborhood has the smallest lot sizes of all the neighborhoods in the Palisades, with lots ranging from 5,200 to 7,500 sq ft in size. The Alphabet Streets are within walking distance to The Village, and this area is characterized by its high density of smaller single family homes on lively narrow streets. The streets, named after Methodist bishops of the late 19th and early 20th century, are consecutively named beginning with A, B, C, D, etc. – hence the name Alphabet Streets. This neighborhood is a destination for trick-or-treaters on Hallowe'en.

=== The El Medio Mesa ===
The El Medio Mesa is located south of Sunset Boulevard beginning about a quarter mile west of The Village, across Temescal Canyon – just past Palisades Charter High School. The El Medio Mesa extends for a long distance from Temescal Canyon all the way to where Sunset Boulevard meets the Pacific Coast Highway.

=== Marquez Knolls ===
Marquez Knolls is a large area of homes located north of Sunset Boulevard beginning about a quarter mile west of The Village across Temescal Canyon on the mountain upslope, known for spectacular ocean views. There is a small shopping center on Marquez Avenue and Sunset Boulevard.

=== The Via Bluffs and the Huntington ===
The Via Bluffs and The Huntington are the neighborhoods that border the "village" proper to the south of Sunset Boulevard, overlooking the ocean. The Via Mesa is located between Temescal Canyon on the west and Potrero Canyon on the east; the Huntington Palisades is located between Potrero Canyon on the west and Chautauqua Boulevard on the east. Both of these neighborhoods are within walking distance to The Village and sit upon high bluffs that look out over the Pacific Ocean.

=== The El Medio Bluffs ===
The El Medio Bluffs, as with The Via Bluffs and The Huntington Palisades, are located on a high ridge overlooking the Pacific Ocean and much of the neighborhood is afforded ocean views and ocean air.

=== Castellammare ===
Castellammare is located along Pacific Coast Highway on small bluffs much closer to sea-level, north of where Sunset Boulevard meets PCH. This is the home of the Getty Villa and the narrow, winding streets in this neighborhood have Italian names and ocean breezes.

=== Rustic Canyon ===
Rustic Canyon is the neighborhood east of Chautauqua Boulevard that dips into Santa Monica Canyon and includes the Will Rogers State Historic Park. The neighborhood features post-war homes located on the former polo field of The Uplifters, the original site of The Uplifters clubhouse (now a city park), and "cabins" developed as second homes and weekend retreats. This area is also known as Uplifter's Ranch.

=== The Riviera ===
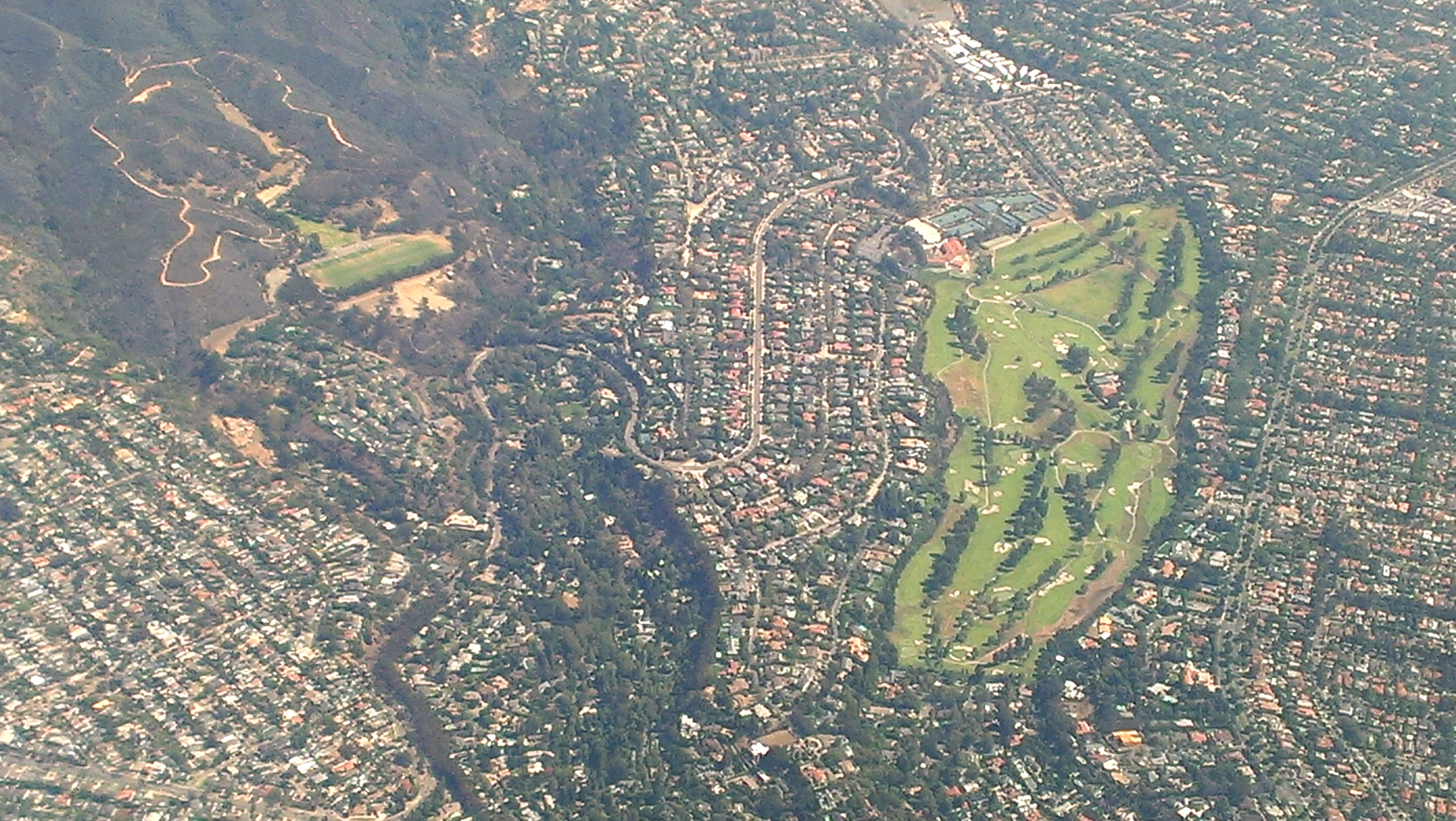
Aerial view of Pacific Palisades, the Riviera neighborhood can be seen to the right

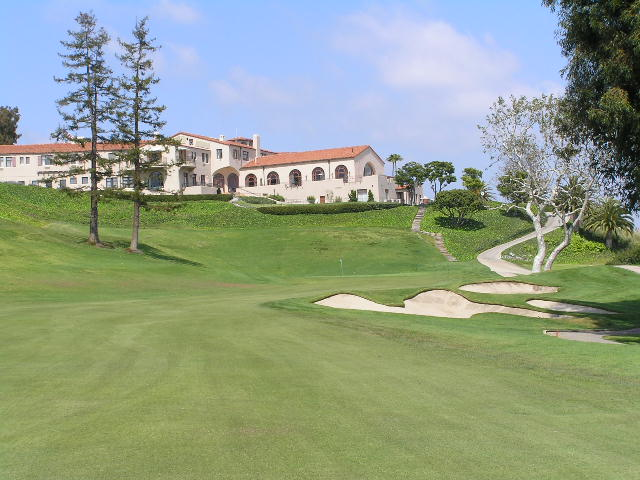
Finishing hole at Riviera Country Club

The Riviera is a Palisades neighborhood located approximately two miles (3.2 km) east of The Palisades Village and features streets named after various locations in the French and Italian Riviera. The neighborhood is divided into north and south sections by Sunset Boulevard. It borders Santa Monica and Brentwood. The Riviera Country Club hosts the Genesis Open on the PGA Tour in February. Riviera has hosted three major championships: the U.S. Open in 1948 and the PGA Championship in 1983 and 1995. Ben Hogan won three times in less than 18 months at the course (1947 and 1948 L.A. Open, 1948 U.S. Open), and it became known as "Hogan's Alley". The country club will also host golf during the 2028 Summer Olympics.

=== Palisades Highlands ===
Main Article: Palisades Highlands, Los Angeles

The Palisades Highlands is a master planned neighborhood in the northern region, located in the upper Santa Ynez Canyon. It was developed by W. Charles Chastain of Headland Properties, beginning in the 1970s. The Highlands has access to several Topanga State Park trailheads. The Highlands itself has a number of gated communities, housing developments and distinct neighborhoods including the following:

- Country Estates: A gated community of 80 homes on the farthest west part of the Highlands.
- Palisades Hills: This is one of highest parts at around 1,600 feet (490 m) above sea level. It was developed in the 1980s.
- The Summit: the newest neighborhood in the Highlands that was developed in the 1990s into the early 2000s. This area includes The Summit Club which is a recreation center.
- Lower Highlands: includes homes and condominiums as well as a shopping center and various commercial properties, development of which began in the early 1970s.

=== Santa Monica Canyon ===
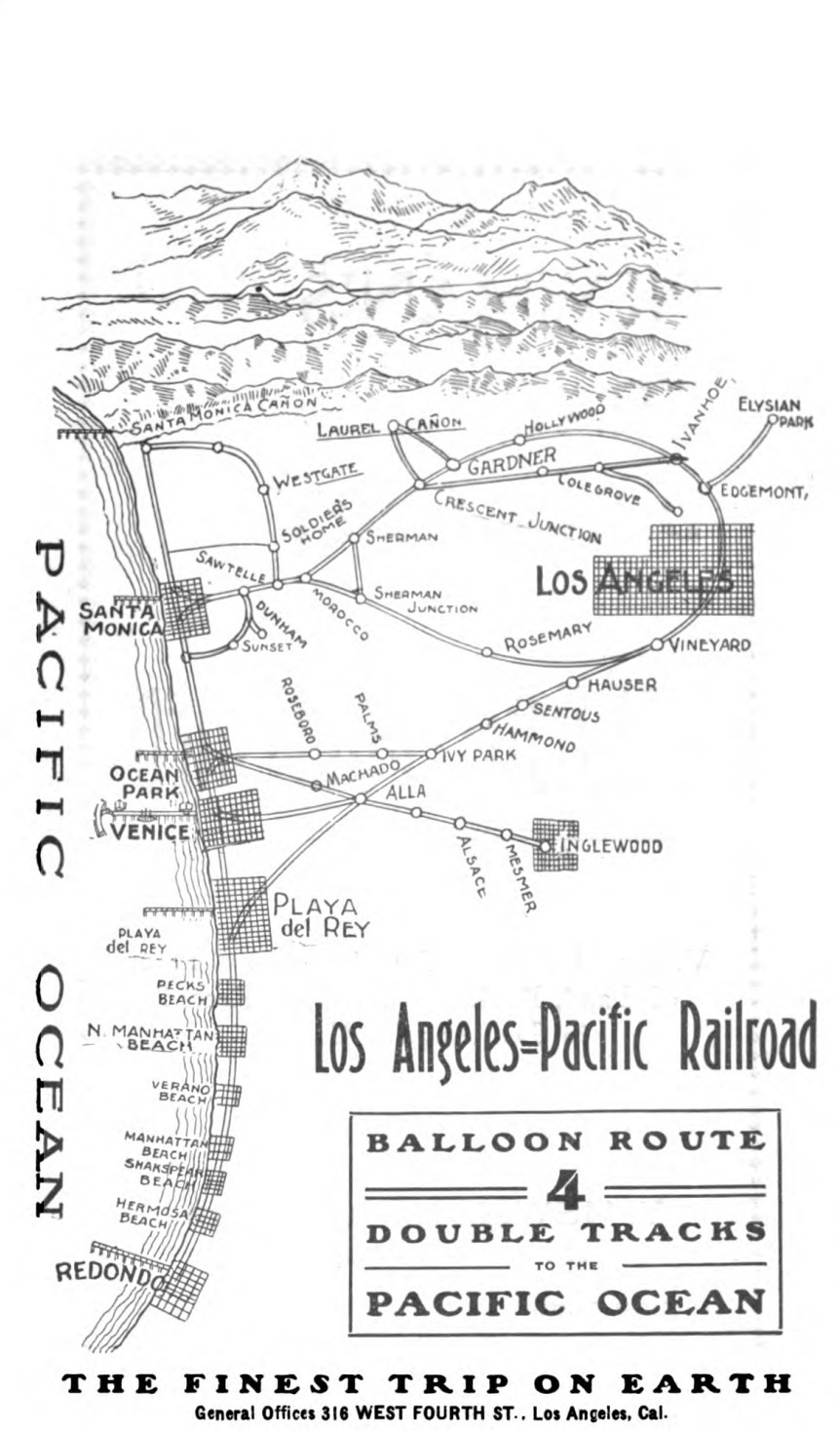
Santa Monica Cañon visible on a LAPRR Balloon Route map circa 1903

Santa Monica Canyon, named for the historic Rancho Boca de Santa Monica, is within the city of Los Angeles and is considered part of the Los Angeles community of Pacific Palisades. Canyon Charter School serves the local area. The neighborhood is bordered by Chautauqua Boulevard to the north and Adelaide Drive to the south.

== Demographics ==
In 2009 the Los Angeles Times's "Mapping L.A." project supplied these Pacific Palisades statistics: a population of 25,507 residents in the 22.84 sq mi (59.2 km^{2}) neighborhood, giving a population density of 1,048/sq mi (405/km^{2}), among the lowest for the city and the county. Demographic data from the 2023 US Census American Community Survey indicated a population that was 81% Non-Hispanic White, 6% Asian, 1% Black, 8% multiracial; 4% of residents were Hispanic or Latino, of any race.

== Parks and recreation ==
=== City parks ===
The Los Angeles Department of Recreation and Parks operates several recreational facilities in Pacific Palisades.

- Palisades Park, at 851 Alma Real Drive, has 117 acres (47 hectares) of land and is the Palisades' largest park. The Palisades Recreation Center, also at that address, has barbecue pits, four baseball diamonds (two lighted, two unlighted), lighted basketball courts (indoor and outdoor), a children's play area, a football field, an indoor gymnasium (no weights are offered), picnic tables, lighted tennis courts, and lighted volleyball courts. The facility also has a kitchen, a stage, a television area, and various scheduled athletic and non-athletic activities. The Pacific Palisades Tennis Court, also at that address, has eight courts.
- Rustic Canyon Park is located along Rustic Canyon Road. The Rustic Canyon Pool is located at 601 Latimer Road. The Rustic Canyon Recreation Center, located at the same address, has a multipurpose with a capacity of 150 people that can be used as an auditorium, a gymnasium, or a volleyball court. The center also has barbecue pits, an unlighted baseball diamond, basketball courts (lighted indoor and unlighted outdoor), a children's play area, an indoor gymnasium (no weights are offered), picnic tables, and volleyball courts (lighted and unlighted).
- Temescal Canyon Park is a non-staffed "pocket park" located along Temescal Canyon Drive from Pacific Coast Highway to Sunset Boulevard. The park has barbecue pits, a children's play area, picnic tables, hiking trails, a native garden, and toilets.
- Santa Ynez Canyon Park is located on Palisades Drive and Avenida de Santa Ynez.
- Rivas Canyon Park is located at the eastern terminus of Oracle Place.

=== Hiking trails ===
Hiking is common in the Palisades, and the community is home to hiking trails including the following:

==== Backbone Trail ====
The Backbone Trail is a long distance trail extending 68 miles (109 km) across the length of the Santa Monica Mountains. The trail runs through both Malibu and Pacific Palisades, with its western terminus in Point Mugu State Park in Malibu and its eastern terminus in Will Rogers State Historic Park in Pacific Palisades. The trail is open to hikers throughout its length; dogs, mountain bicyclists and horseback riders are allowed on portions of the trail as posted. The trail follows a well-maintained, single-track path with some dirt roads. There is no permit required for hiking it.

==== Bushwacker's Delight ====
Bushwacker's Delight is a 0.8 mile lightly trafficked point-to-point trail with 528 ft in elevation gain, located within Will Rogers State Historic Park. This trail is frequented by more-experienced hikers as it is an uncleared trail with overgrown vegetation.

==== Eagle Springs Fire Road Loop Trail ====
Eagle Springs Fire Road Loop Trail is a 5.5 mile-long loopwith 1,095 ft in elevation gain, located near the Palisades Highlands neighborhood. The trail is paved and well-maintained as it doubles as a fire road, and offers activity options. It is most popular from September to May. This is one of the few trails in Los Angeles County open to those on horseback. This trail offers parking in the nearby lot for $10 a day, and is easily accessible from the Palisades and neighboring Topanga. The Eagle Springs Fire Road Loop Trail leads to Eagle Rock, a rock formation which is a common spot for photography as its peak offers sweeping views and is home to a variety of native lizards.

==== High Point Trail ====
High Point Trail is 2.8 mile-long trail with 1,007 ft of elevation gain located in the Santa Monica Mountains overlooking the Palisades. It is a paved trail that begins on private property, and hikers frequently trespass knowingly or unknowingly to complete the hike. This trail is noted for its wildlife, and though the trail is paved, parts are overgrown with bushes and other vegetation. The trail leads to "Goat Peak", one of the highest points in the Palisades with views of the area.

==== Inspiration Point Trail ====
Inspiration Point Trail is a 2.1 mile-long hiking trail with 324 ft in elevation gain located within Will Rogers State Historic Park near the Riviera neighborhood. This is one of the oldest hiking trails in Los Angeles and was created by Will Rogers in the early 20th century. It is one of the few trails in the Palisades open to dogs. The trail is one of the main attractions of Will Rogers State Park, as it is an easy hike with unique vistas of the Los Angeles Basin and Santa Monica Bay. On a clear day one can see views of areas such as Catalina Island, Chino Hills, and Saddleback Peak at the summit of the trail. Inspiration Point Trail connects to Backbone Trail.

==== Los Leones Trail ====
Los Leones Trail, also known as Los Liones, is a moderately-challenging trail located in the Castellammare neighborhood. It is 7.3 miles long, with over 1,300 ft in elevation gain. Often spelled "Los Liones", the area is named after the mountain lions common in the area.

Los Leones is one of the most popular trails in the Westside, and moves through a canyon located in the southern end of Topanga State Park, which is 1/3 mile away from the Pacific. The top of the trail joins East Topanga Fire Road, which leads to the Paseo Miramar Trail which leads deeper into the Santa Monica Mountains. Further on the trail is "Parker Mesa Overlook", known for some of the best views of the coast of any trail in Los Angeles. The area consists of a flat plateau area near the coast.

==== Murphy Ranch Trail ====
Murphy Ranch Trail

==== Skull Rock Loop ====
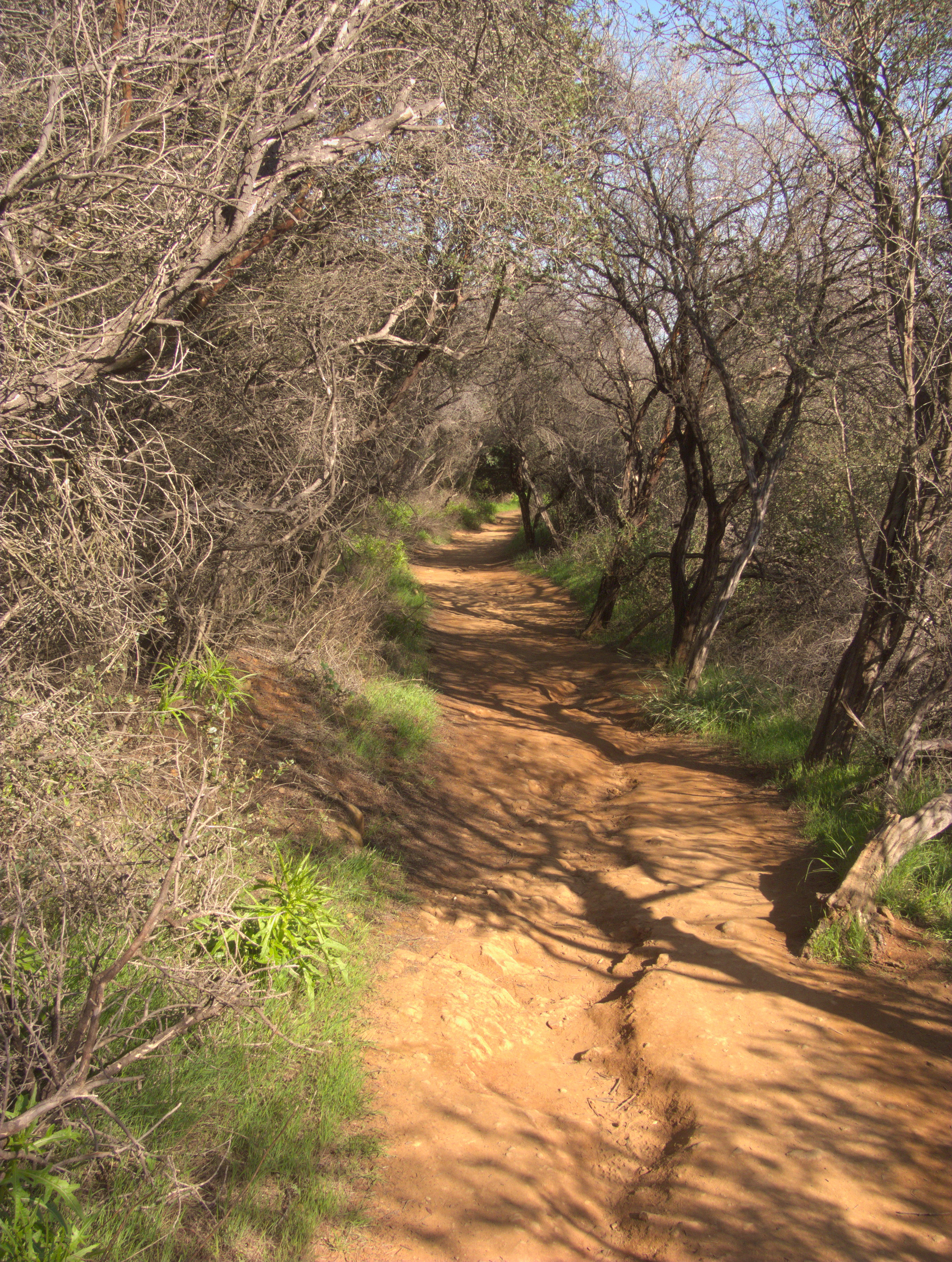
Temescal Canyon Ridge Trail

Skull Rock Loop is a 4-mile-long loop trail with 1,141 ft of elevation gain located near the Temescal Canyon neighborhood. This trail is frequented by both rock climbers and birders, as it is home to rocky terrain and an abundance of bird species. Skull Rock Loop branches off from the nearby Temescal Canyon Trail, and features a waterfall as well as its namesake "Skull Rock", a rock formation named for its resemblance to a skull. The entrance to the trail offers free street parking or a daily rate in the nearby parking lot for $12.

==== Trailer Canyon Fire Road ====
Trailer Canyon Fire Road is a 4.3 mile-long trail with 925 ft in elevation gain located near the Summit development in the Palisades Highlands neighborhood. This trail is wide and paved as it doubles as a fire road, it is also used by mountain bikers and birdwatchers. After 1.5 miles this trail connects with the nearby Temescal Ridge Trail, which takes hikers to the Temescal Gateway Park. Trailer Canyon Fire Road has views of the ocean and Temescal Canyon.

==== Will Rogers Trail ====
Will Rogers Trail is a 4.1 mile trail with 449 ft in elevation gain located within Will Rogers State Historic Park. This trail is one of many trails located within the Will Rogers State Park, near the Riviera neighborhood. Will Rogers Trail is known for being very challenging even for experienced hikers, as it is not very well-maintained, and there are signs on portions of the trail which point this out. Those hiking may have to scramble on stones through the underbrush to avoid falling into the nearby creek. During winter the creek often overflows its banks, obscuring the trail and making it even more treacherous.

=== State parks and beaches ===
The California Department of Parks and Recreation also has locations in Pacific Palisades.

==== Will Rogers State Beach ====
Will Rogers State Beach extends 1 3/4 mi (3 km) along the shore. The beach features swimming and skin diving. Facilities include volleyball courts, playground and gymnastic equipment, as well as a bike path and walkway. A number of movies and TV shows have been filmed at this beach. The beach is located off the Pacific Coast Highway, near the intersection with Temescal Canyon Road. The beach is operated by the County of Los Angeles Department of Beaches & Harbors.

==== Will Rogers State Historic Park ====
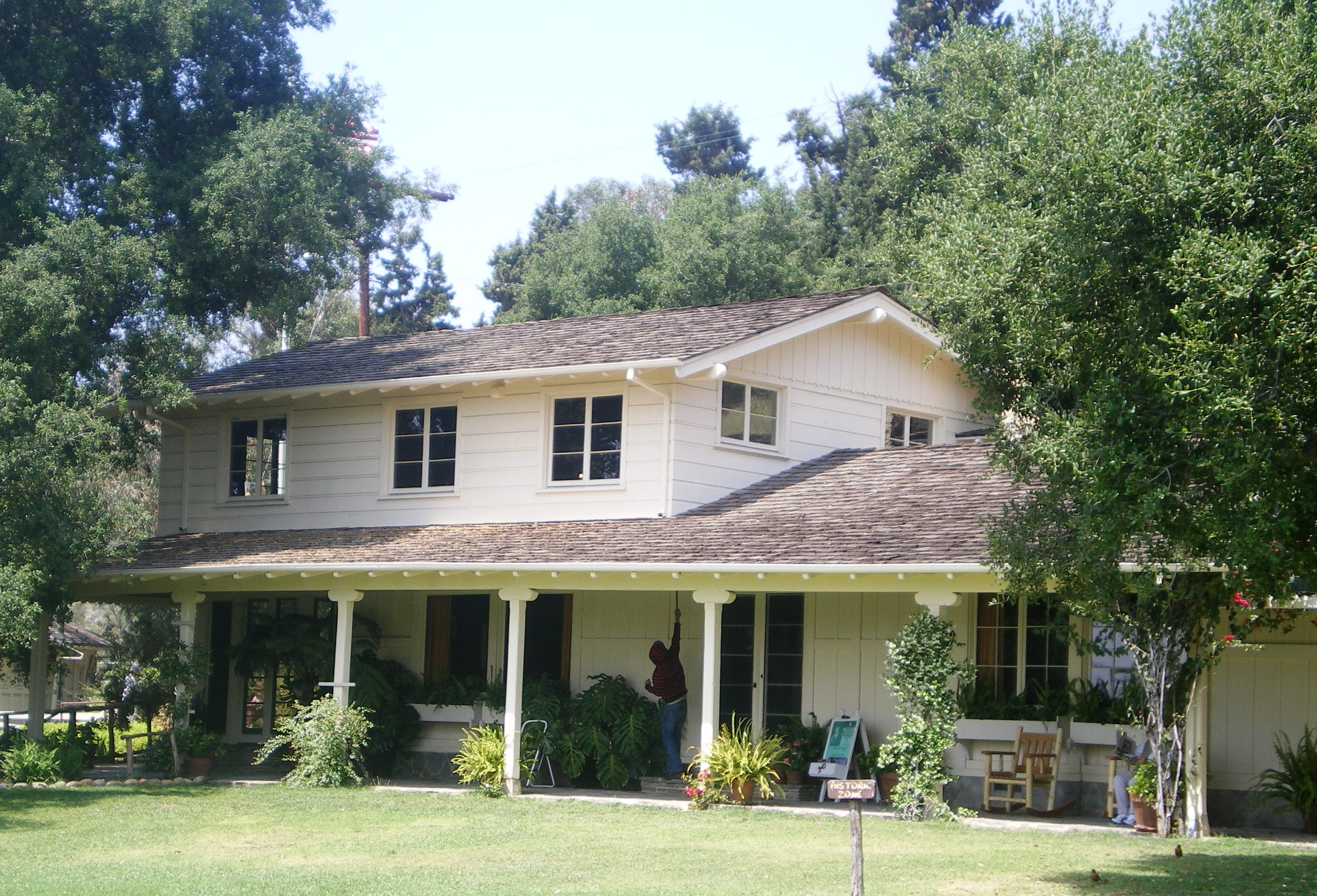
Will Rogers House, one of the park's main attractions

While Will Rogers made Beverly Hills his home in the late 1920s, in 1922 he bought a large plot of 186 acres (80 hectares) of land above Sunset Blvd. to build a weekend cottage. He built a polo field on the property in 1926, and in 1928 he and his family made it their home. In 1944, nine years after Rogers died, the ranch became a state park. In the interest of historical preservation, the home is maintained as it was including the furniture and fixtures. It is open to the public most days with the exception of major holidays, although admission is required. The top of the property's trail includes vistas of the ocean and city.

==== Temescal Gateway Park ====
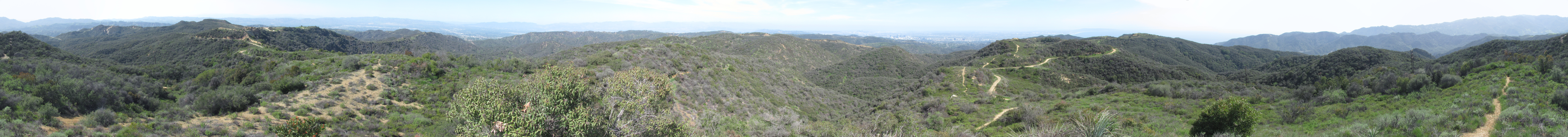
Panoramic view from Temescal Peak

Temescal Gateway Park, located at 15601 Sunset Blvd., has 141 acres (57 hectares) of oak and sycamore canyons, ridgetop views, and access to miles of trails in Topanga State Park, Will Rogers State Historic Park, and the 20,000-acre (8,000-hectare) "Big Wild".

==== Topanga State Park ====
Located in the cliffs and canyons of the Santa Monica Mountains and headquartered in nearby Topanga Canyon, Topanga State Park features 36 mi (58 km) of trails through open grassland, live oaks and views of the Pacific Ocean. The park is bound on the south by Pacific Palisades and Brentwood, on the west by Topanga Canyon, and on the east by Rustic Canyon. Numerous geologic formations can be found in the park, including earthquake faults, marine fossils, volcanic intrusions, and a wide variety of sedimentary formations. Trail heads into the park are located throughout Pacific Palisades, including Las Lions Drive, Palisades Highlands, Temescal Gateway Park and Will Rogers State Historic Park.

== Government and infrastructure ==
The most important civic group within the Palisades is the Pacific Palisades Community Council. The Pacific Palisades Community Council usually meets twice each month to discuss a wide range of issues that affect its residents. The council has rejected city offers to become an official part of the city, preferring its independent, non-aligned status. Among the main reasons that Council members cite is that the council would not have the power to appeal decisions of City officials, commissions, and boards and the council could not appear before Federal, State, and County authorities regarding local issues.

=== Local government ===
The community is within District 11 of the Los Angeles City Council, represented by Traci Park.

The Los Angeles Fire Department operates two fire stations serving Pacific Palisades. Station 69 at 15045 West Sunset Boulevard serves Pacific Palisades and the Pacific Coast. Station 23 at 17281 West Sunset Boulevard serves the Palisades Highlands, Castellammare, and the Pacific Coast.

The Los Angeles Police Department operates the West Los Angeles Community Police Station at 1663 Butler Avenue, serving the neighborhood.

=== County, state, and federal representation ===
Pacific Palisades is within Los Angeles County's 3rd Supervisorial District. As of 2014, Sheila Kuehl represents the district.

The Los Angeles County Department of Health Services SPA 5 West Area Health Office serves Pacific Palisades. The department operates the Simms/Mann Health and Wellness Center in Santa Monica, serving Pacific Palisades.

Pacific Palisades is a part of California's 50th State Assembly district. As of 2019, Richard Bloom represents the district. Pacific Palisades is also a part of California's 23rd State Senate district; as of 2019, Ben Allen represents the district. The community is a part of the State Board of Equalization District 4, represented by Mike Schaefer, as of 2019.

In the U.S. House of Representatives, Pacific Palisades is within California's 32nd congressional district, and is currently represented by Brad Sherman. The United States Postal Service operates the Pacific Palisades Post Office, at 15243 La Cruz Drive.

=== Fire service ===
Los Angeles Fire Department Stations 23 and 69 serve the area. Station 23 is located on Sunset Boulevard at the bottom of Los Liones Drive and Station 69 is located on Sunset Boulevard and Carey Street.

=== Law enforcement and security ===
Pacific Palisades is served by the West Los Angeles Division of the Los Angeles Police Department. One police car is generally assigned to the neighborhood. Many residents also rely on private security companies such as ADT, or ACS security.

== Politics ==
Pacific Palisades is a heavily Democratic area, and Democrats tend to win the majority of the vote in each election.

In the 2024 presidential election, of the 11,151 votes cast from the five voting precincts that largely constitute the Palisades (9005918A, 9005919A, 9005929A, 9001382A, 9007693D), 71.17% went for Kamala Harris, while Donald Trump and Robert F. Kennedy Jr. received just 27.75% and 1.08% of the Palisadian vote, respectively.

== Education ==
=== Public schools ===
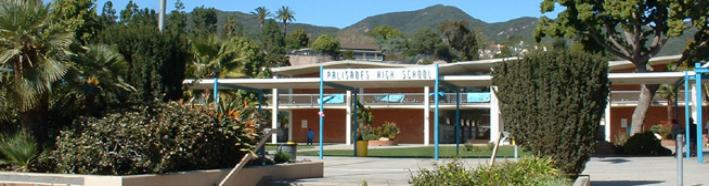
Palisades Charter High School

Residents are zoned to Los Angeles Unified School District schools. The area is within Board District 4. As of 2017, Nick Melvoin represents the district.

Some residents are assigned to Pacific Palisades Elementary School, some residents are assigned to Canyon Elementary School, and some are assigned to Marquez Elementary School. All residents are zoned to Paul Revere Charter Middle School and Palisades Charter High School.

- Canyon Elementary School opened in 1910.
- Pacific Palisades Elementary opened in 1922.

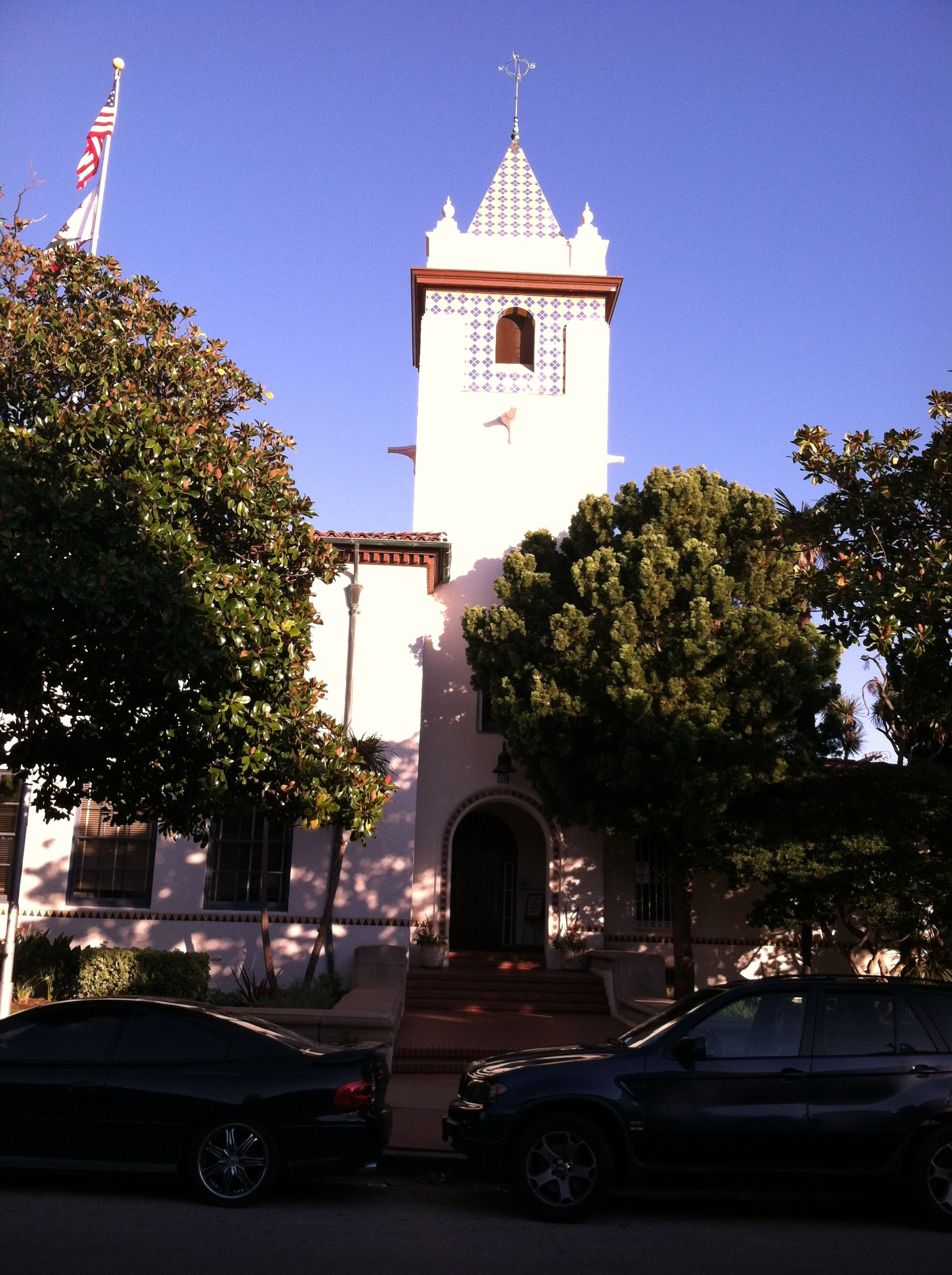
Pacific Palisades Charter Elementary School front tower

- Marquez Elementary School opened in 1955.

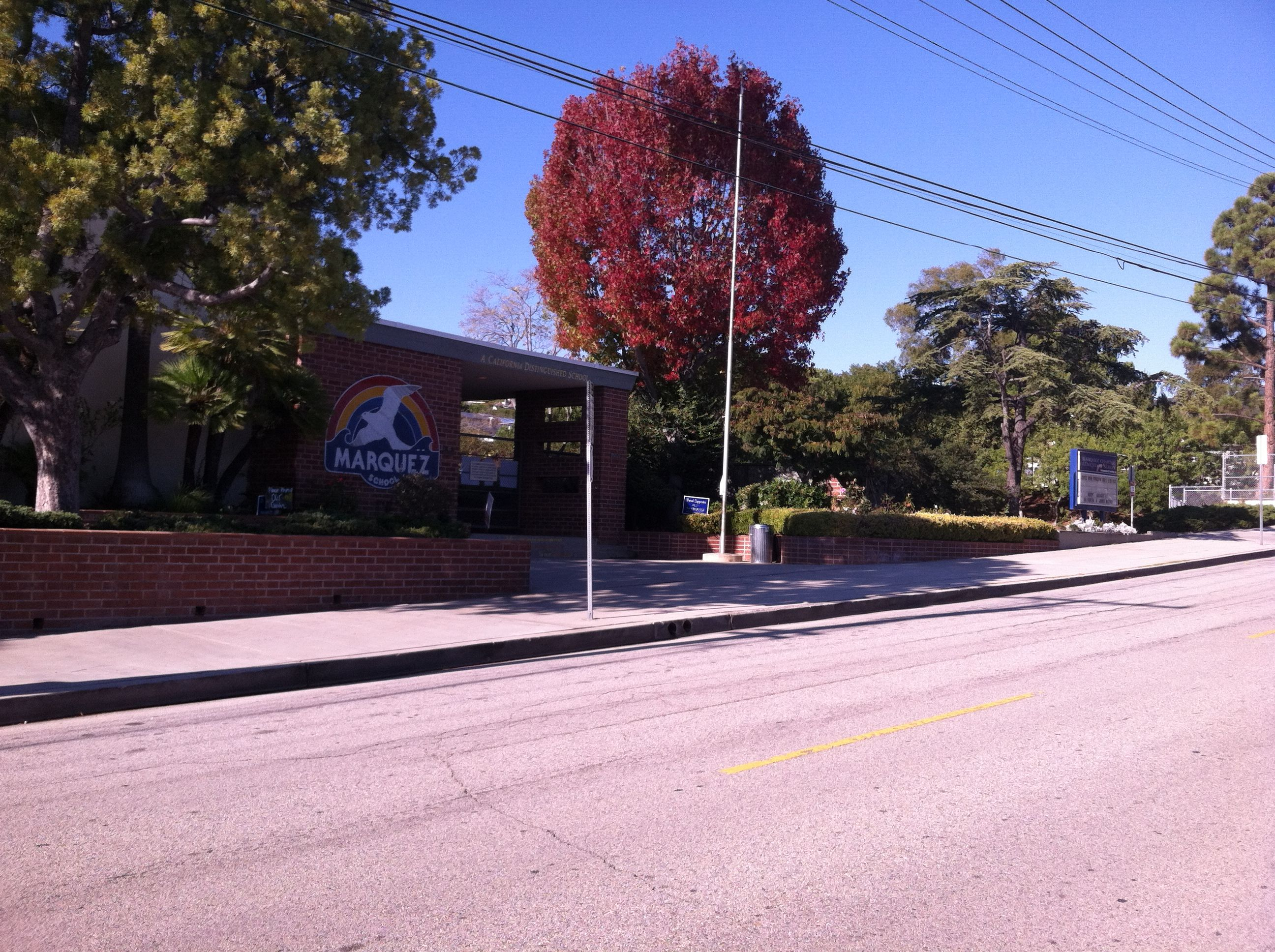
Marquez Elementary School

- Paul Revere Middle School first opened as Palisades-Brentwood Junior High School on September 12, 1955; it chose its current name during its first year of operation. It became an internal charter in 1994.
- Palisades Charter High School, commonly known as "Pali High", opened in 1961. It later became a charter school in 1994.

=== Private schools ===
Private schools in the area include:

- Palisades Jewish Early Childhood Center (preschool-kindergarten) – is a Jewish private school associated with the Chabad movement offering private preschool, kindergarten, daycare and Hebrew school education.
- Calvary Christian (K–8)
- Village School (pre-K–6)
- Corpus Christi (K–8)
- St. Matthew's Parish School (PS–8)
- Seven Arrows (K–6)
- Westside Waldorf (K–8)
- Lycée Français de Los Angeles Pacific Palisades Campus

=== Public libraries ===
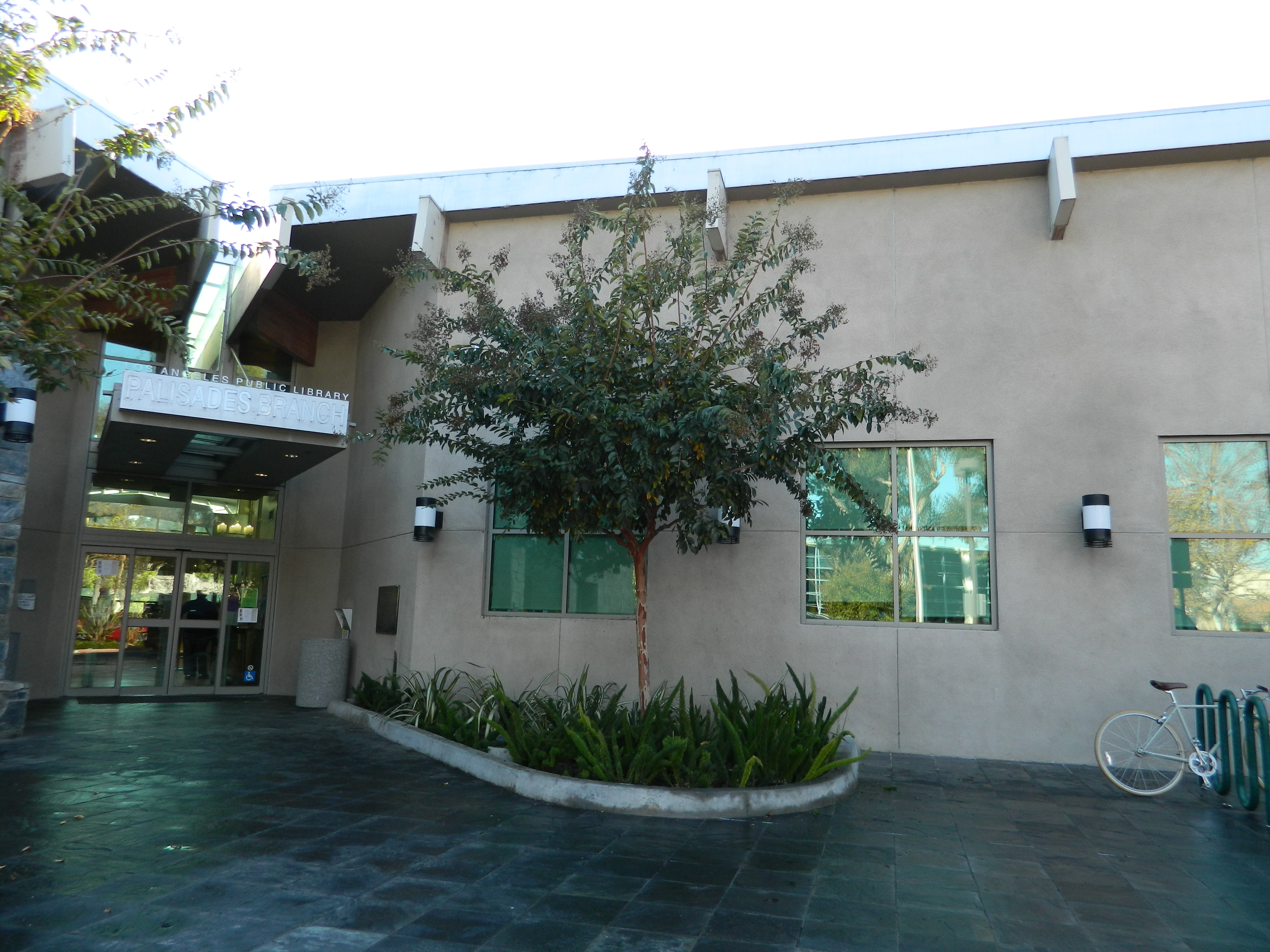
Los Angeles Public Library Palisades Branch

The Los Angeles Public Library operates the Palisades Branch at 861 Alma Real Drive.

== Culture ==
=== Menorah lighting ===
Beginning in 1988, each year on the first night of Hanukkah a public menorah lighting ceremony is held at the Palisades Village, the downtown area of the Palisades. The menorah lighting is organized by Chabad of Pacific Palisades as well as other leaders in the local Jewish community, and the Pacific Palisades Chamber of Commerce. It is hosted by Palisades Chabad Rabbi Zushe Cunin, as well as the honorary mayor, the city councilman representing the area, and local developer Rick Caruso. It is accompanied by a community event featuring live Hanukkah music, complimentary Hanukkah foods such as latkes, chocolate gelt and sufganiyot, Hanukkah-themed arts and crafts, face painting and balloon twisting.

On December 2, 2018, the 30th Annual Pacific Palisades Menorah Lighting was held at its new location, the Palisades Village shopping center. This was the highest-attended menorah lighting in Palisades history and was attended by over 1,000 people, including actors and Co-honorary Mayors Janice and Billy Crystal, Rabbi Zushe Cunin, Palisades Village developer Rick Caruso, and councilman Mike Bonin. The Crystals also helped in the planning of the event. The event performances of Hanukkah and other traditional Jewish music by the Marquez Elementary Choir, Paul Revere Music Club and the Westside Waldorf School.

Pacific Palisades is also home to one of the few vegan Hanukkah celebrations in Los Angeles, "Lights and Latkes", hosted by vegan Rabbi Jonathan Klein and JewishVeg Los Angeles.

=== Palisades Rocks The Fourth! ===
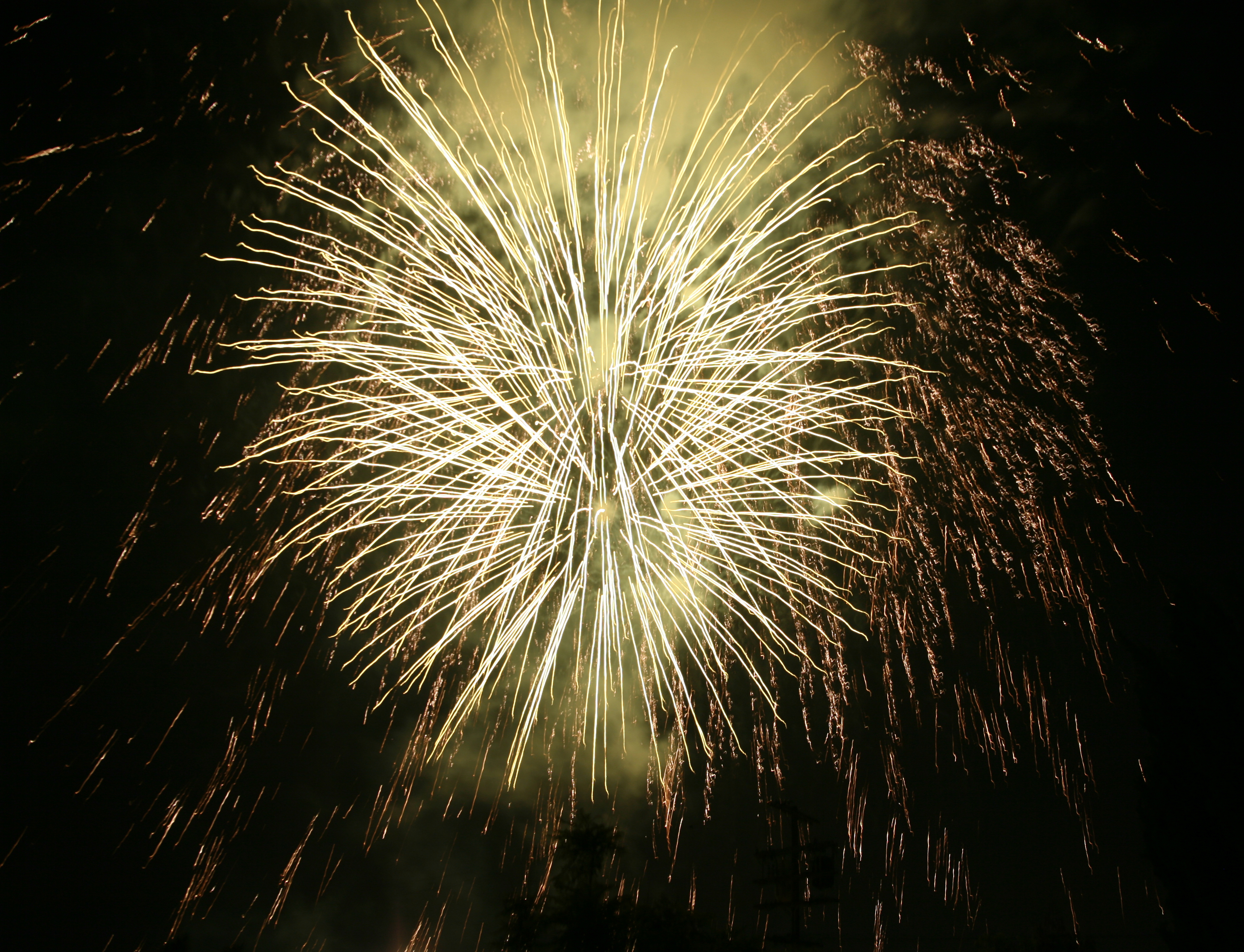
Fireworks during the 2006 Palisades Rocks The Fourth! event

Palisades Rocks The Fourth is a Palisadian tradition that first began in 1967. Every Fourth of July, the community's Chamber of Commerce sponsors day-long events which include 5K and 10K runs, a home decorating contest, a parade down Sunset Boulevard, and a concert accompanied by a fireworks display at Palisades High School football field.

Due to the COVID-19 pandemic, Palisades Rocks The Fourth! was held mostly virtually beginning in 2020. A virtual concert accompanied by fireworks and a flyover by World War II fighter pilots flying AT-6 trainers over the Palisades.

=== Synagogues ===
Pacific Palisades is home to a large Jewish population and has a number of synagogues including the following:

- Chabad of Pacific Palisades- local Chabad center located at 17315 Sunset Blvd in the Castlellammare neighborhood, offering religious services, Hebrew school and early Jewish education. Chabad of the Palisades hosts a number of Jewish events, and is also responsible for the annual Menorah lighting and Hanukkah celebration at the Palisades Village.
- Kehillat Israel- Reconstructionist synagogue, this is the oldest synagogue in the Palisades.

== Sports and recreation ==
=== Bel Air Bay Club ===
The Bel-Air Bay Club is both an event venue (Upper Club) and a private beach club (Lower Club) located in the area.

=== Riviera Country Club ===
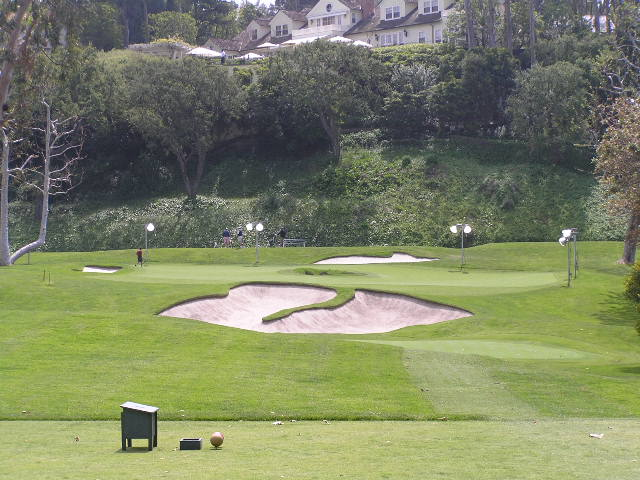
Par 3 on the course

The Riviera Country Club is a private club with a championship golf course and tennis courts in the Riviera neighborhood of Pacific Palisades. It is a block south of Sunset Boulevard.

The Riviera was designed by golf course architects George C. Thomas, Jr. and William P. Bell, it has been the primary host for the Genesis Invitational (originally the Los Angeles Open), an annual event on the PGA Tour in February. The 2021 edition was the 62nd held at Riviera.

The Riviera has hosted three major championships: the U.S. Open in 1948, and the PGA Championship in 1983 and 1995. In addition, it was site of the U.S. Senior Open, a senior major, in 1998 and the U.S. Amateur in August 2017. The club is scheduled to host the Olympics in 2028.

=== Will Rogers Polo Club ===
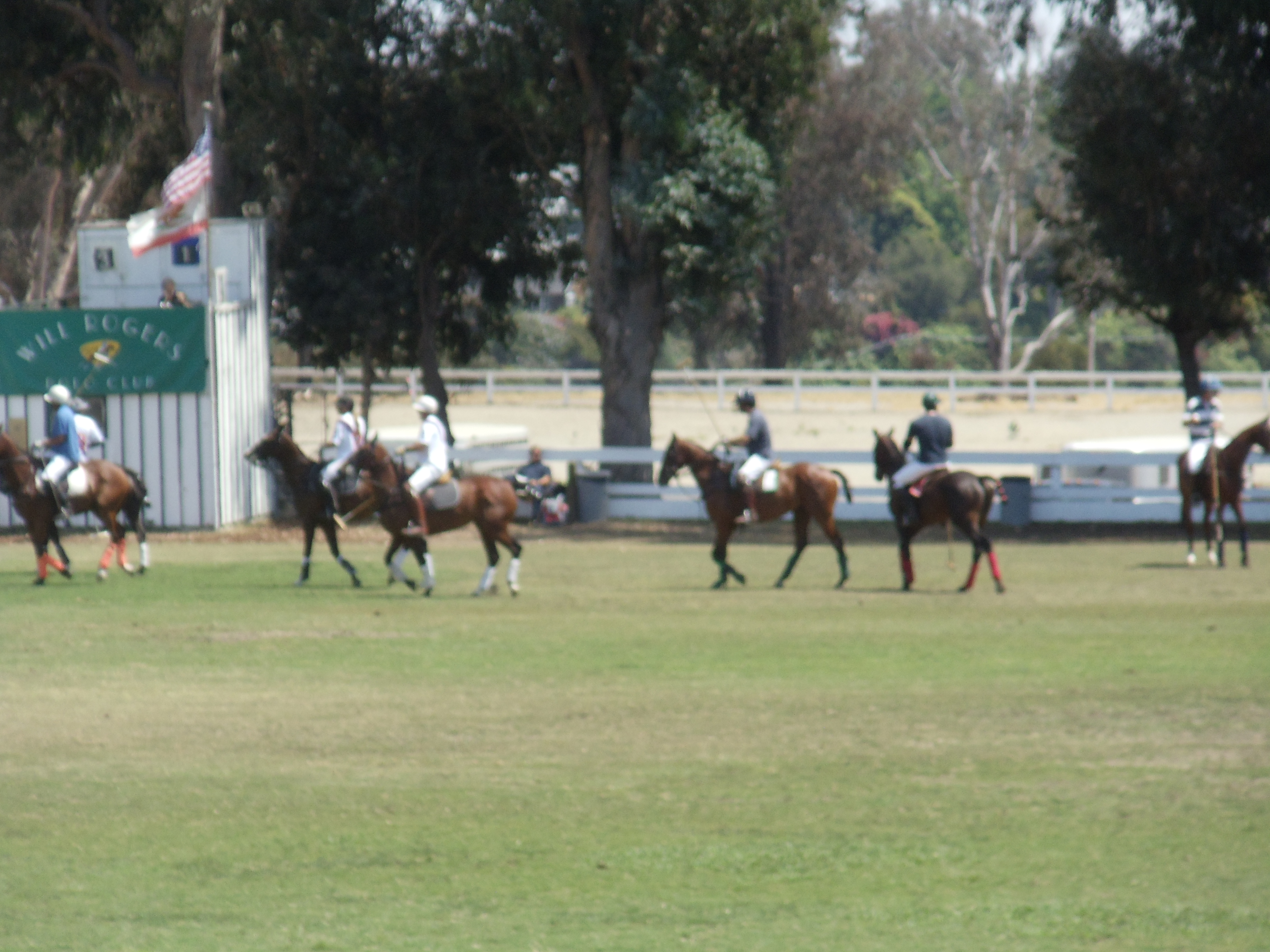
Match at the Will Rogers Polo Club in 2013

The Will Rogers Polo Club is a polo club located at 1501 Will Rogers State Park Road, Pacific Palisades, Los Angeles, California., which is within Will Rogers State Historic Park, and is Southern California's only remaining polo club.

== Media ==
- The Los Angeles Times is the citywide newspaper.
- The Palisadian-Post, founded in 1928, briefly ceased publication in 2025, and relaunched in 2026, is the longest-running newspaper to serve the Pacific Palisades community.
- The Palisades News, first published in 2014, is a Palisades-based newspaper published twice monthly for the residents of Pacific Palisades.
- Circling The News is a local news site established in 2017 by Sue Pascoe, a former writer for The Palisades News, and featuring a number of guest writers and columnists.
- Perspective Palisades is a local magazine founded by local historian and realtor Michael Edlen in 2020, the magazine is published each quarter and features real estate-related news as well as historical information, news in the community, and interviews with notable Palisadians.

== Landmarks ==
=== Burns House ===
Architect Charles W. Moore designed his first house in Los Angeles for the UCLA economist and urban planning professor, Leland Burns. The house was completed in 1974. It occupies a narrow ledge on a steep slope of the Santa Monica canyon. The house is composed of an interlocking set of shed roofs and tower, its forms reminiscent of The Sea Ranch Condominium, but adapted for a sense of the Mediterranean climate and Hollywood allusions. An interior staircase climbs up through a vertical cleft in the narrow house, and then at the very top of the third story, the stair descends outside, back down into a swimming pool court. Designer Tina Beebe developed with Moore the color scheme, whereby exterior planes were painted in a range of ochres, pinks, roses, and golds, so as the light and shade shifts during the day, the house itself seems to change like a chameleon. The house was built around a tracker organ hand-built by Jürgen Ahrend, an instrument known as Opus 1, U.S.A.

=== Bradbury House ===
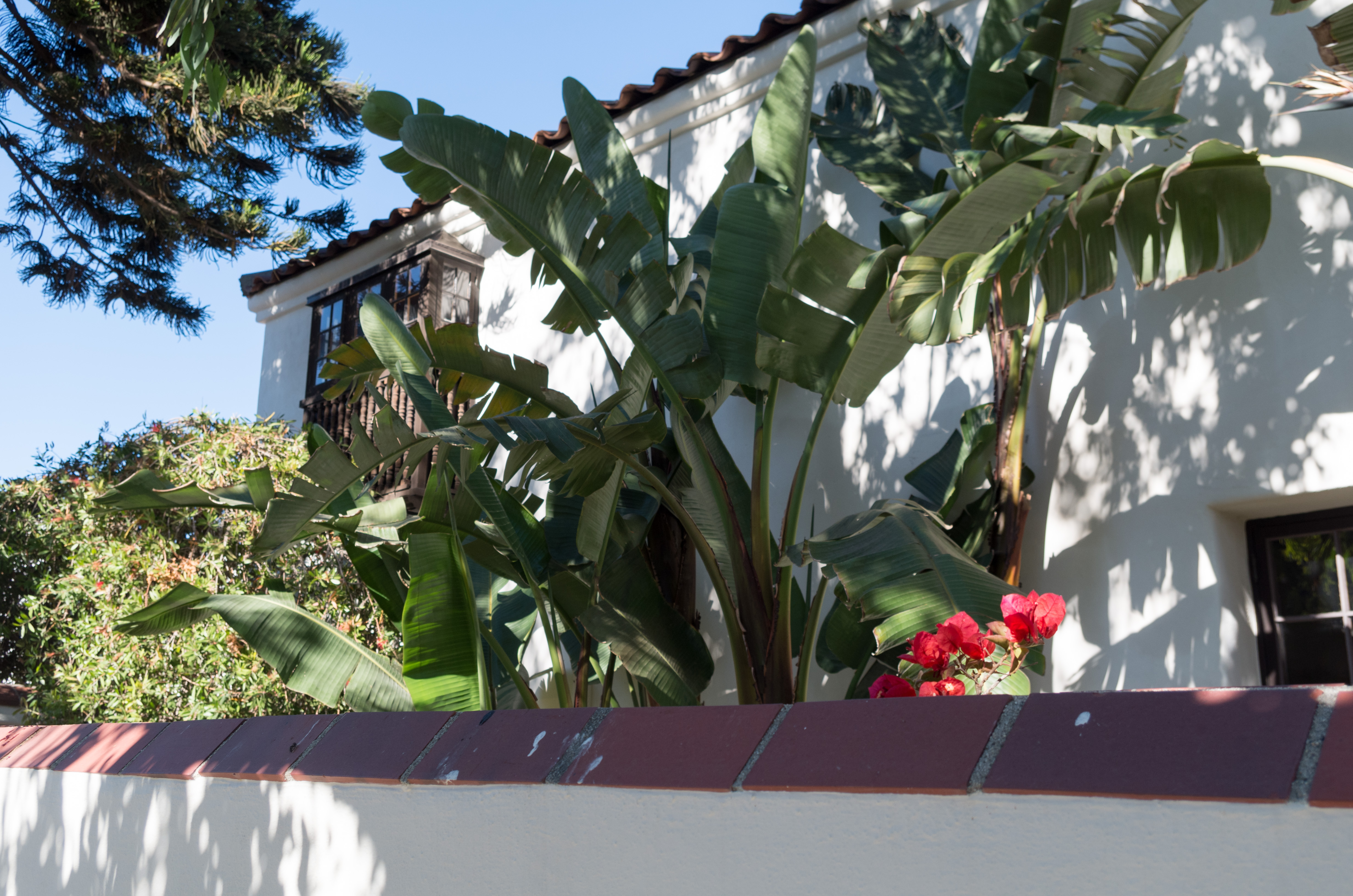
Bradbury House

The Bradbury House is a historic house in the Huntington Palisades neighborhood. It was designed in the Spanish Revival style by architect John Byers, and it was completed in 1923. The home was built for Lewis L Bradbury Jr, whose father, Lewis L Bradbury, commissioned the construction of the Bradbury Building in Downtown Los Angeles. It has been listed on the National Register of Historic Places since March 22, 2010.

=== Business Block ===
The Business Block building was a historic building located in the Palisades downtown area called the Village, prior to the 2025 fire. It served as the anchor of the downtown area, and was designed by architect Clifton Nourse and dedicated in 1924. The building was 30,000 square feet (2,800 m^{2}) and sits on 36,000 square feet (3,300 m^{2}) of land. The Business Block building is located between Antioch, Swarthmore and Sunset in the Village neighborhood of Pacific Palisades, an area in the Westside of Los Angeles, California.

=== Case Study houses ===
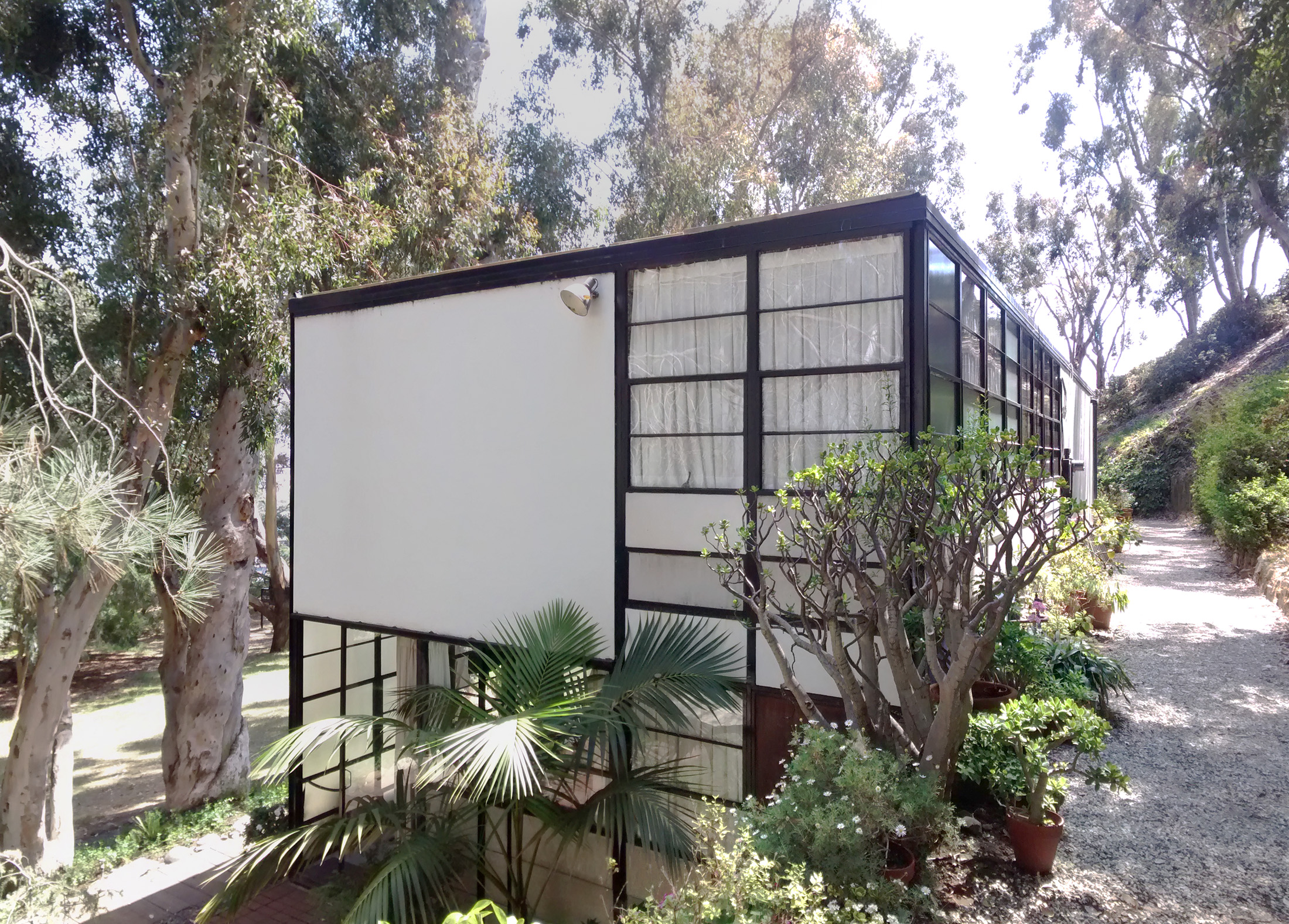
Eames House

Four residences were designed on the same city block for the Case Study Houses program in the late 1940s. These are the Eames House (Case Study House No. 8), the Entenza House (No. 9), the West House (No. 18) and the Bailey House (No. 20). The Eames House, the home and studio of husband-and-wife design pioneers Charles and Ray Eames, was added to the National Register of Historic Places as a National Historic Landmark in 2006. The Entenza and West houses were also added to the National Register of Historic Places in 2013.

=== Dolores del Río House ===
The Dolores Del Río House is located at 757 Kingman Avenue and was designed for Mexican-American actress Dolores del Río and her husband, production designer Cedric Gibbons, by architects Douglas Honnold and George Vernon Russell in 1929.

=== The Getty Villa ===
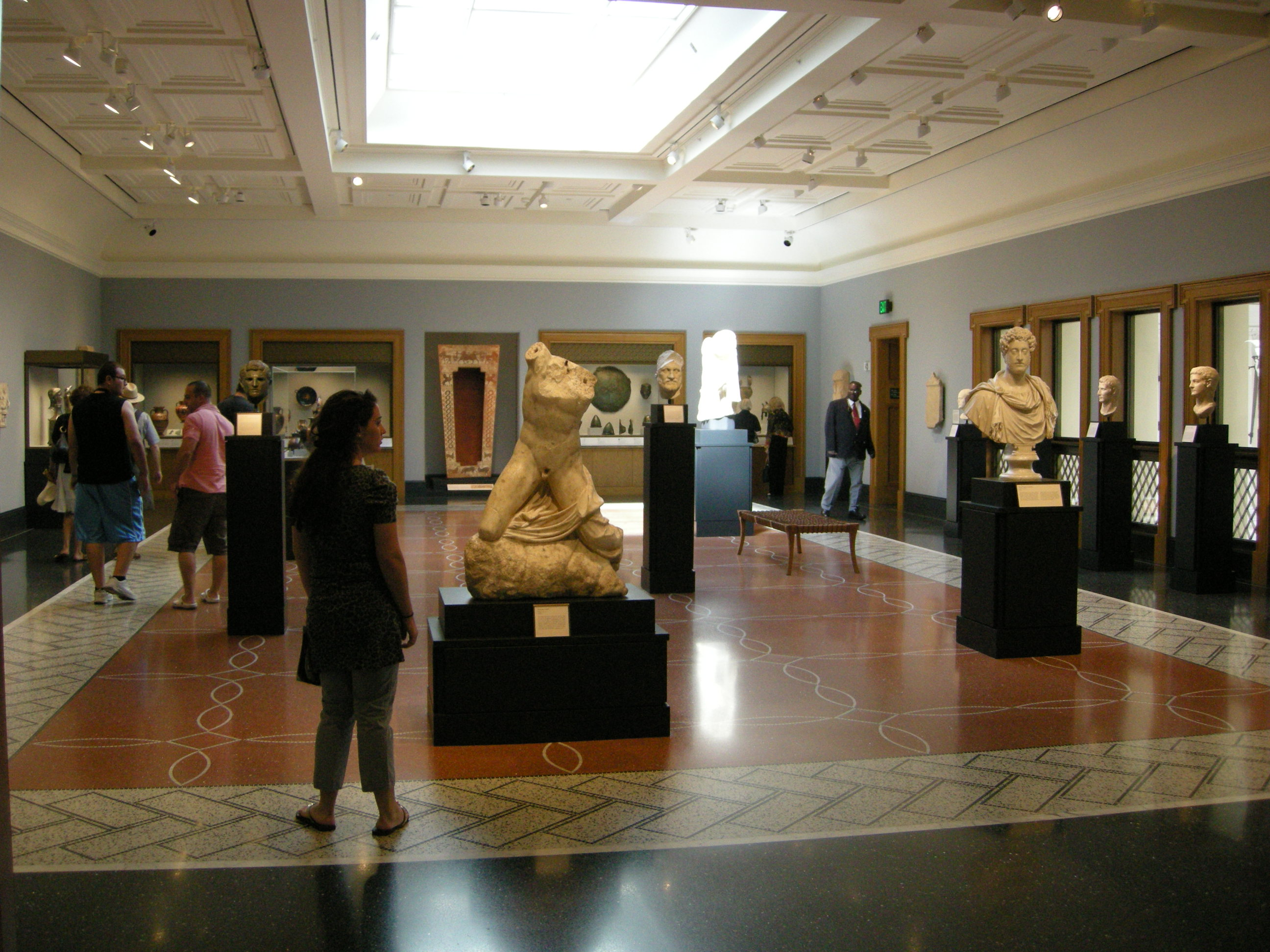
Art on display at the Getty

The Getty Villa is an educational center and museum dedicated to the study of the arts and cultures of Ancient Greece, Rome, and Etruria.

=== Kappe Residence ===
The Kappe Residence is a house located in the Rustic Canyon section of Pacific Palisades, that was designed by architect Raymond Kappe, and was intended to be his own private residence. The house is a modern design built into a heavily treed hillside. The Kappe Residence was designated a Los Angeles Historic-Cultural Monument in 1996, and in 2008 it was named one of the top ten houses in Los Angeles by an expert panel selected by the Los Angeles Times.

=== Mort's Palisades Deli ===
Mort's Palisades Deli, more commonly referred to as Mort's Deli, was a Jewish delicatessen located at 1035 Swarthmore Ave on the corner of Sunset Boulevard in the Village. Mort's was a neighborhood fixture and local landmark, which first opened in 1972 and closed in 2008 upon the building's sale to former mayor Richard Riordan, who closed the deli to make way for a bistro, which itself closed after a few months. The deli was known for their Reuben sandwiches and celebrity clientele including Larry David, Walter Matthau, and Larry King among others, as well as being featured in numerous episodes of Curb Your Enthusiasm as Leo's Deli.

=== Old Santa Monica Forestry Station ===
The Old Santa Monica Forestry Station is the nation's first experimental forestry station, built in 1887. The Old Santa Monica Forestry Station was designated a California Historic Landmark (No.840) on March 20, 1970. Old Santa Monica Forestry Station is located in the Rustic Canyon neighborhood of Pacific Palisades. It is south of what is now called Santa Monica Mountains National Recreation Area. The hills and canyons around the Santa Monica Canyon were a land boom in the late 1880s. In 1971 the state placed a marker near the entrance of the Rustic Canyon Recreation Center at the NW corner of Latimer and Hilltree Roads, at 601 Latimer Road; which reads:

In 1887, the State Board of Forestry established the nation's first experimental forestry station. Located in Rustic Canyon, the station tested exotic trees for planting in California, established plantations for management studies, and produced planting stock for scientific and conservation purposes. The station was operated by the Board of Forestry until 1893 and by the University of California until 1923.

=== Self-Realization Fellowship Lake Shrine ===
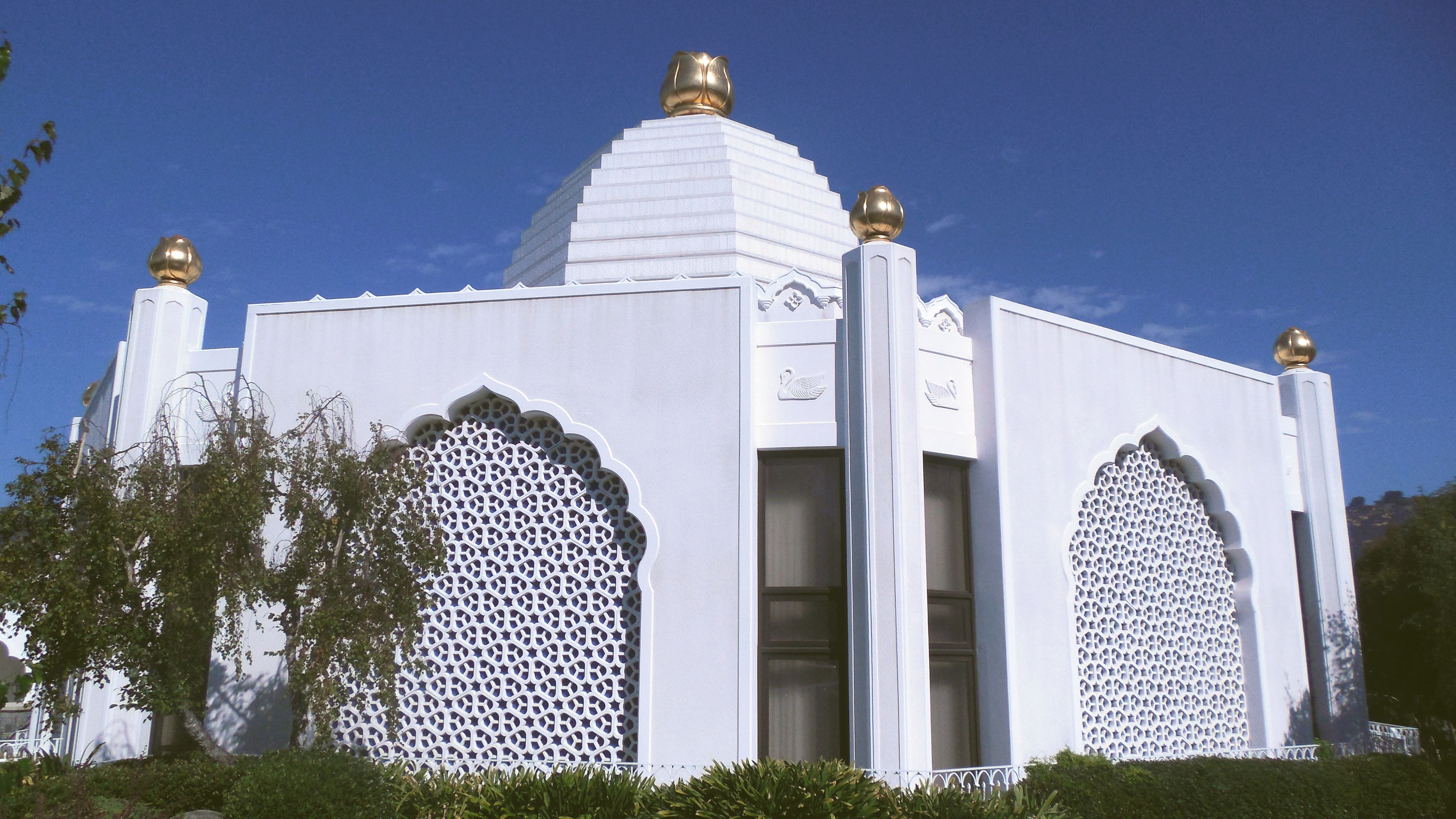
Temple located at the Self-Realization Fellowship Lake Shrine

Self-Realization Fellowship Lake Shrine is a 10-acre (4-hectare) spiritual center on Sunset Boulevard founded in 1950 by Paramahansa Yogananda, whose classic book Autobiography of a Yogi introduced many Westerners to yoga and Eastern mysticism.

=== Thomas Mann House ===
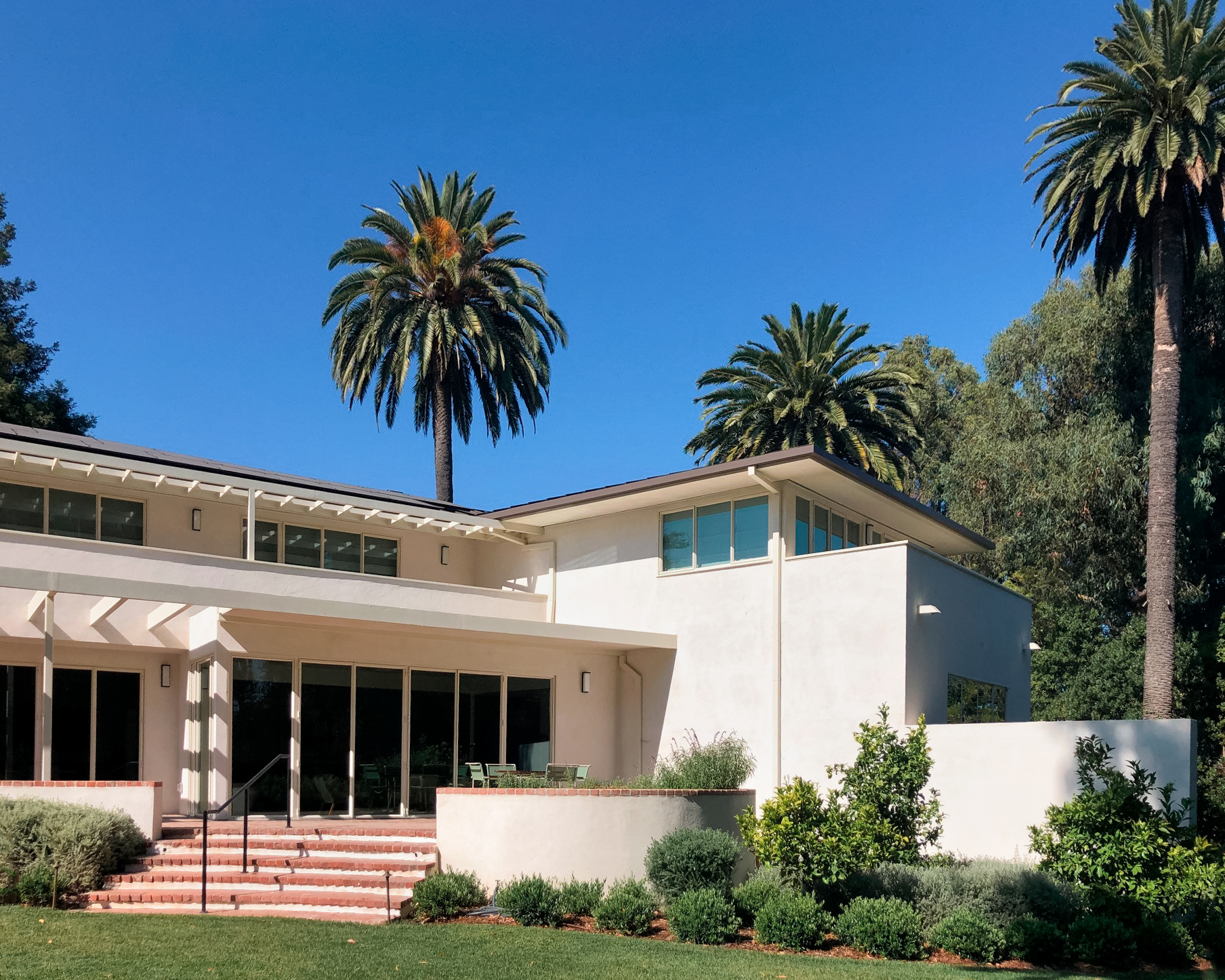
Thomas Mann House

Designed by JR Davidson, this was Thomas Mann's home during his exile from 1942 to 1952.

=== Villa Aurora ===
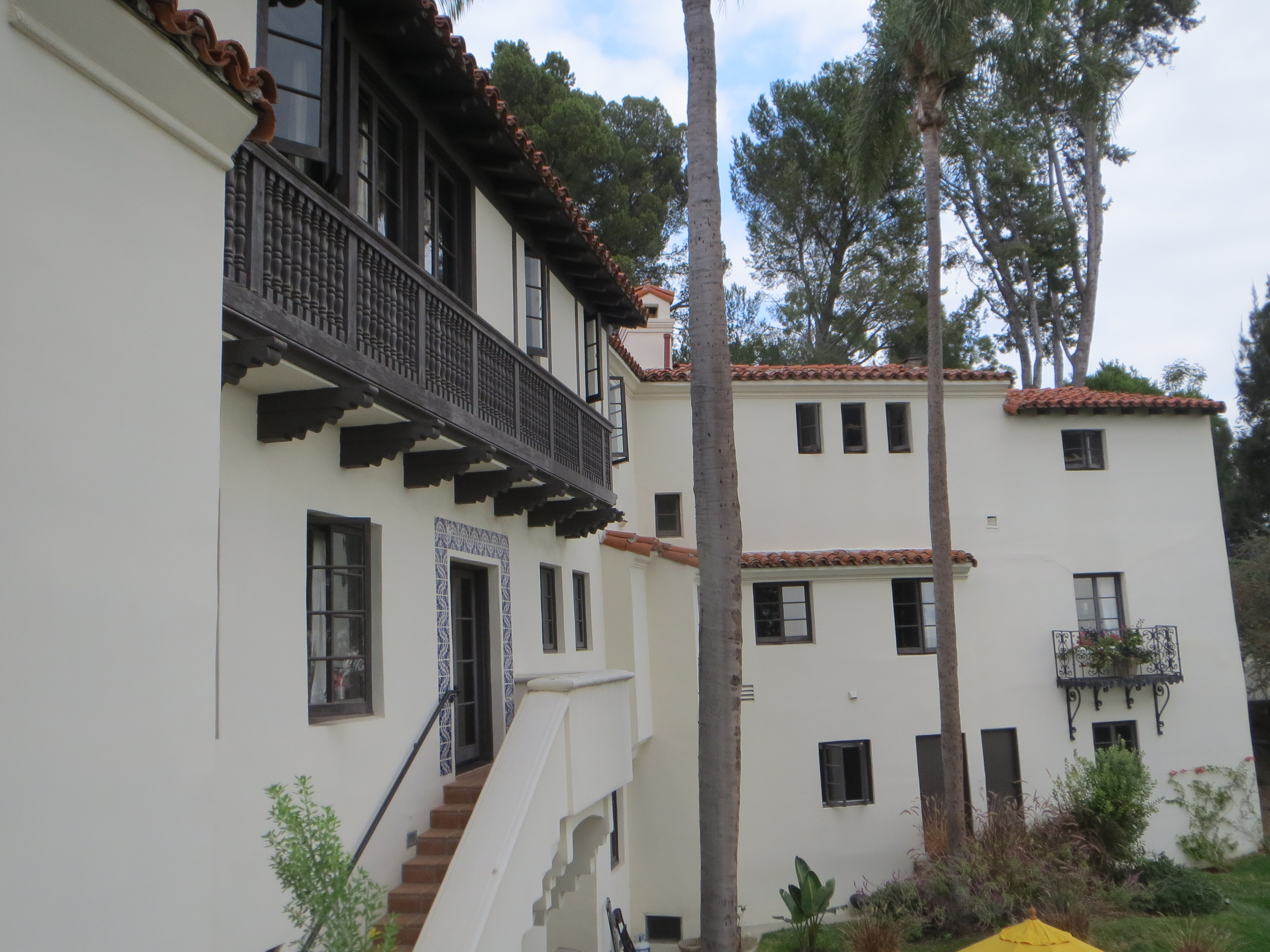
Villa Aurora

Villa Aurora is an artists' residence, Historic-Cultural Monument, and former home of exiled German-Jewish writer Lion Feuchtwanger and his wife Marta.

== Wildlife ==
Pacific Palisades is home to a variety of species of wildlife, both native to the area and introduced from elsewhere.

=== Wild parrots ===
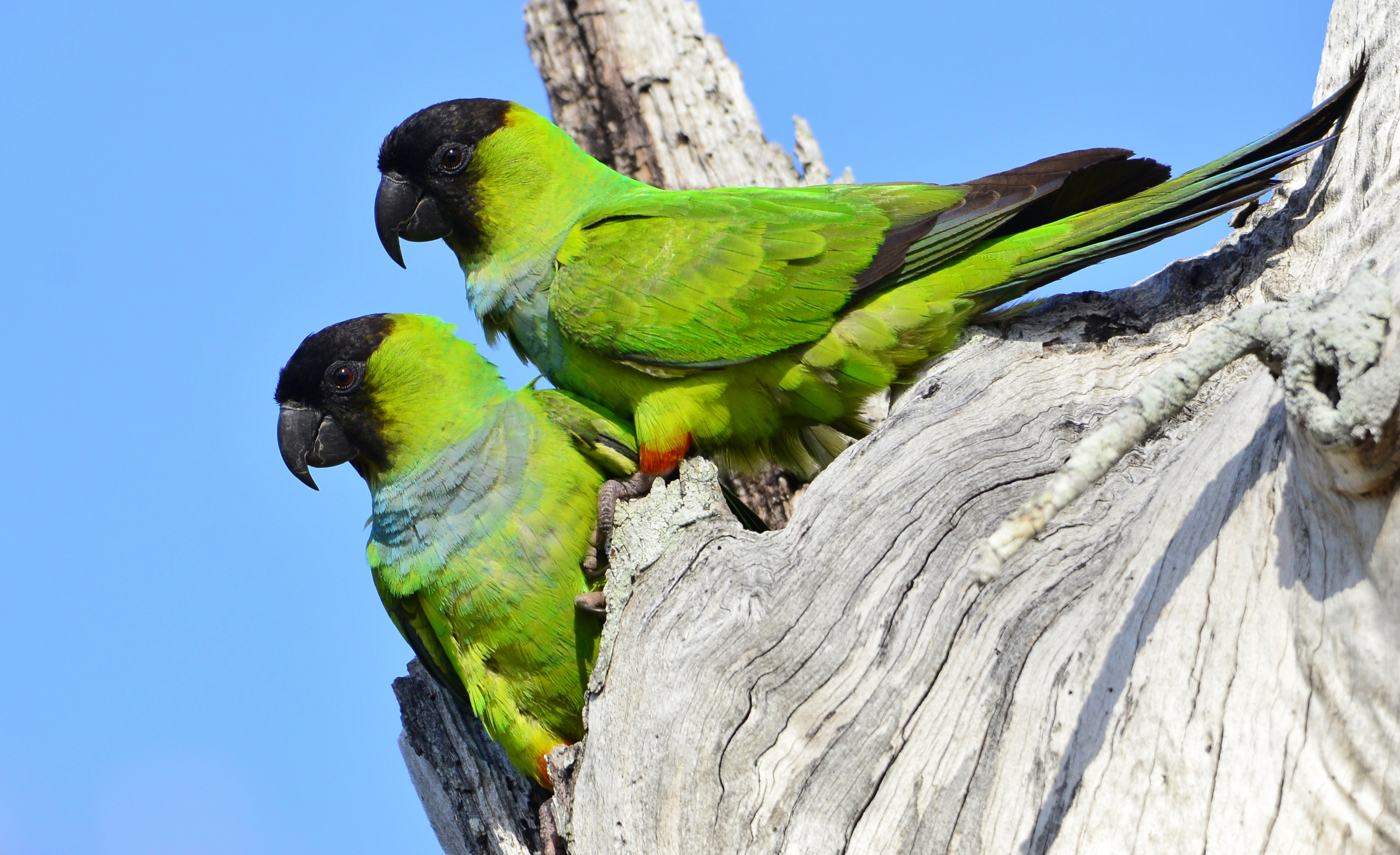
Nanday parakeets resting in a tree in Pacific Palisades

Pacific Palisades has been noted for its large population of California wild parrots, and is one of the main areas in Southern California where wild parrots can be found. Parrots mainly live in the sycamore-lined canyons of the Palisades. Wild parrots have lived in the Palisades since the 1960s, and are said to descend from pet parrots that were released by their owners in the area in the wake of the 1961 Bel Air fire, and the closing of Busch Gardens in Van Nuys.

Pacific Palisades is home to numerous species of parrots, and the most commonly-sighted species is the Nanday parakeet. Other species of parrots found in the Palisades include the mitred parakeet, yellow-chevroned parakeet, white-winged parakeet, rose-ringed parakeet, red-masked parakeet, blue-crowned parakeet, red-crowned parrot, lilac-crowned parrot, white-fronted parrot, blue-fronted parrot, yellow-headed parrot, and the red-lored parrot.

== In popular culture ==
- Jerry Lewis lived on Amalfi Drive in Pacific Palisades during the 1950s. He shot several Gar-Ron Productions home movies at that house with neighbors Tony Curtis and Janet Leigh. He became the honorary mayor of the Palisades in 1953.
- The Beach Boys 1963 hit "Surfin' U.S.A." mentions Pacific Palisades in its list of Southern California surf spots.
- The 1976 book, What Really Happened to the Class of '65? is about members of one of Palisades High School's early graduating classes and how their once-privileged lives turned out years later, often disastrously. The book, by author David Wallechinsky, son of novelist Irving Wallace, and his classmate, film critic Michael Medved, described Pacific Palisades as a microcosm of America during the tumultuous Summer of Love era.
- The West Coast Avengers, a California-based branch of the Marvel Comics superhero team, were depicted as based out of an estate in Pacific Palisades.
- Pacific Palisades, a 1997 TV series produced by Aaron Spelling, was named after the area.
- The characters on the teen show Saved by the Bell (1989–1993) mention on several occasions that their school is located in Pacific Palisades.
- Popular show 90210 mentions Palisades High as their rivals and has filmed some episodes on the beach and at a local restaurant, Cafe Vida.
- British alternative rock band Ash included a song entitled "Pacific Palisades" on their 2001 album Free All Angels.
- Rapper Childish Gambino's 2013 album Because the Internet was recorded in the former mansion of athlete Chris Bosh. The short film Clapping for the Wrong Reasons, which Glover both wrote and starred in, was filmed at the mansion as well. The Palisades are mentioned on the album in the song "IV. Sweatpants", along with the follow-up mixtape Kauai, which features a track named "The Palisades".
- In Modern Family, the Dunphy children attend Palisades Charter High School.
- The main character of the TV series Transparent lives in a house in Pacific Palisades.
- Rapper Kendrick Lamar mentioned the Palisades on his albums Mr. Morale & the Big Steppers and Untitled Unmastered.
- The Hyundai Palisade is named after Pacific Palisades.

=== Filming locations ===
- Some scenes of Prizzi's Honor were filmed at 15025 Corona Del Mar. The house has since been demolished.
- The house used for the exterior shots of the Pearson residence in the 1979 film Phantasm is located at 1232 Corsica Drive in Pacific Palisades.
- The 1957 film No Down Payment has several sequences around Pacific Palisades posing as a Los Angeles suburb.
- Food Network's Everyday Italian is filmed on El Medio.
- The TV series Baywatch was filmed at Lifeguard Headquarters by tower 15 of Will Rogers State Beach in Pacific Palisades.
- The TV series The Rockford Files was often filmed in and around the Palisades in the 1970s.
- The first-season residence of the television series The Golden Girls was a home in Pacific Palisades. For subsequent seasons, a facade house was built on the Disney/MGM back lot.
- The HBO series Curb Your Enthusiasm features both the real-life and in-universe Pacific Palisades residence of Larry David.
- The 2014 movie God's Not Dead had scenes filmed at 1033 Ravoli Drive in Pacific Palisades.
- The 2014 movie Redeemed, starring Pacific Palisades resident Ted McGinley, also was filmed at 1033 Ravoli Drive.

Palisades Charter High School has regularly been used as a film location, including the films Carrie (1976), Crazy/Beautiful (2001), Freaky Friday (2003), Havoc (2005), and Project X (2012), and the TV series Popular, Modern Family, Teen Wolf (2011), and James at 16 (1977). It was also the set for the music video for Black Flag's "Slip It In".

== See also ==
- List of districts and neighborhoods in Los Angeles
- Old Santa Monica Forestry Station in Pacific Palisades.
