= January 2025 Southern California wildfires =

Series of wildfires in California, United States

- Part of the 2025 California wildfires
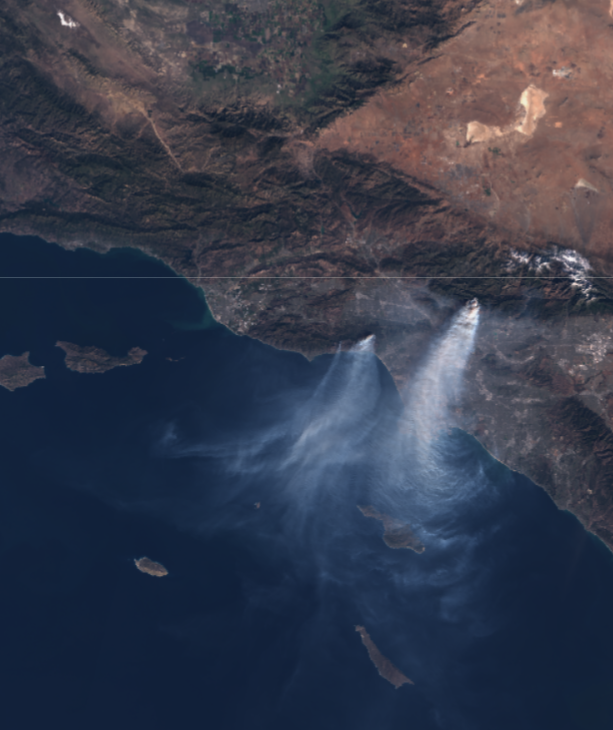
- Sentinel-3 satellite image of the Palisades (left) and Eaton (right) fires burning near Los Angeles, California, January 9, 2025
- Date: January 7–31, 2025 (24 days)
- Location: Los Angeles, Orange, Riverside, San Bernardino, San Diego and Ventura counties, California

Statistics
- Burned area: Roughly 57,529 acres (23,281 ha; 90 sq mi; 233 km^{2})

Impacts
- Deaths: 31 (400+ Indirect)
- Missing people: 31+
- Evacuated: 200,000+
- Structures destroyed: 18,189+ destroyed or damaged

Ignition
- Cause: Under investigation, exacerbated by severe Santa Ana winds and drought conditions

Map
- Overview of major fires in the Greater Los Angeles area (map data)

From January 7 to 31, 2025, 14 destructive wildfires affected the Los Angeles metropolitan area and San Diego County in California, United States. The fires were exacerbated by drought conditions, low humidity, a buildup of vegetation from the previous winter, and hurricane-force Santa Ana winds, which in some places reached 100 miles per hour (160 km/h; 45 m/s). The wildfires killed at least 31 people, forced more than 200,000 to evacuate, destroyed around 20,000 homes and structures, and burned more than 57,529 acres (23,281 ha; 89.889 sq mi) of land.

Most of the damage was from the two largest fires: the Eaton Fire in Altadena and the Palisades Fire in Pacific Palisades, both of which were fully contained on January 31. Municipal fire departments and the California Department of Forestry and Fire Protection (CAL FIRE) fought the property fires and wildfires, which were extinguished by tactical aircraft alongside ground firefighting teams. The deaths and damage to property from these two fires made them likely the second and third-most destructive fires in California's history, respectively. In August 2025, researchers from Boston University's School of Public Health and the University of Helsinki published a study, through the American Medical Association, connecting up to 440 deaths to the wildfires.

In October 2025, 29-year-old Jonathan Rinderknecht was arrested and charged with starting the Palisades Fire. Rinderknecht is accused of intentionally setting a fire in Pacific Palisades on January 1. Dubbed the Lachman Fire, it was thought to be extinguished by the Los Angeles Fire Department, but it was rekindled by strong winds on January 7 and became the Palisades Fire.

== Background ==
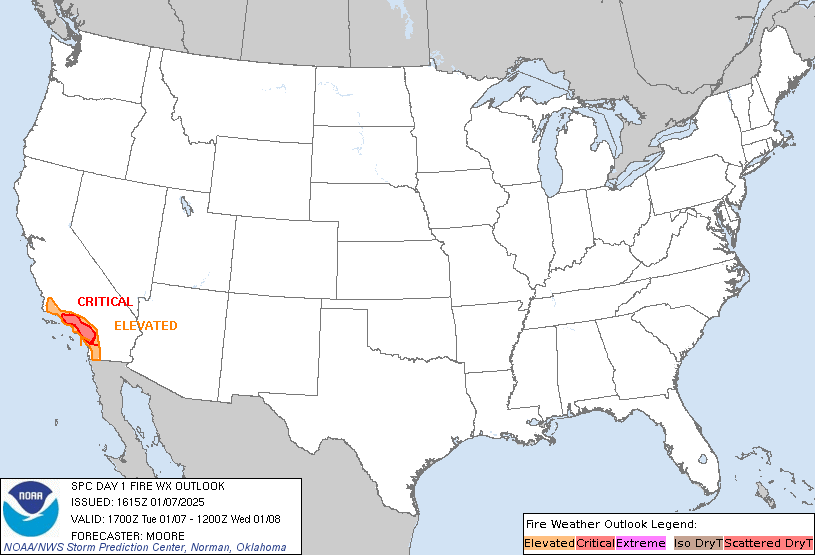
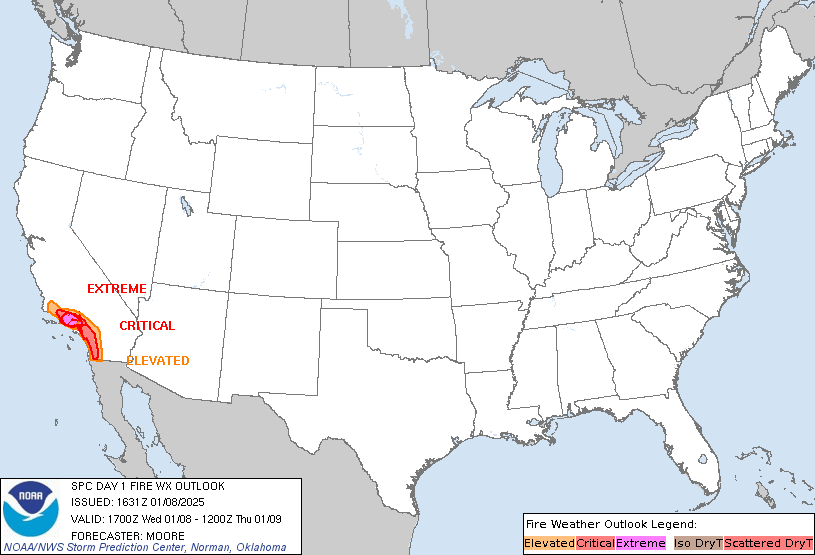
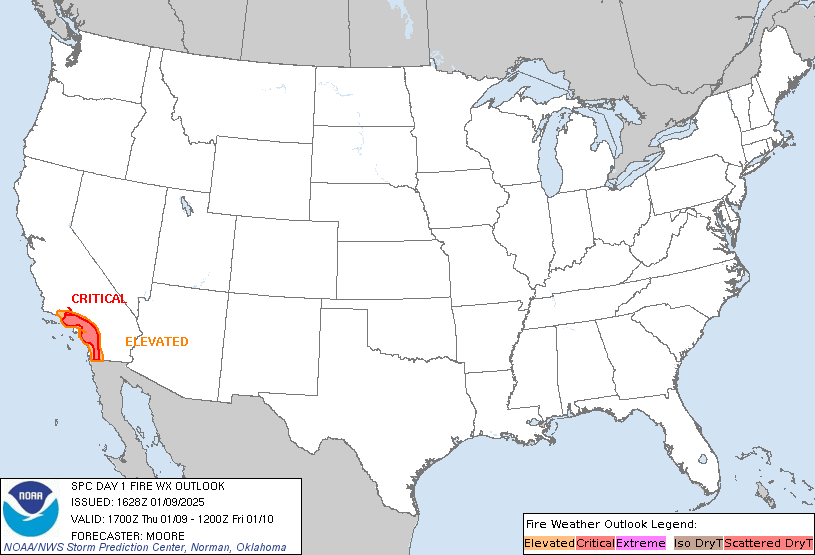
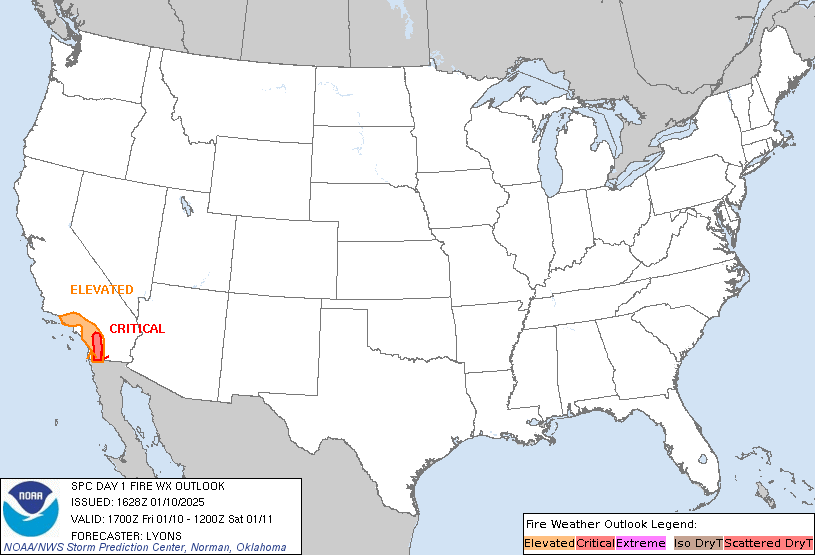
Storm Prediction Center fire weather outlooks from January 7 to 10

The windstorm and resulting fire danger were well forecast. On January 1, the Lachman Fire broke out. The Lachman Fire was contained at 4:46 a.m. local time and was limited to only eight acres and did not destroy any structures. The Palisades Fire was later reported to start from a similar spot as to where the Lachman Fire started. On January 2, the National Interagency Fire Center (NIFC) warned that conditions in Southern California fostered "above normal significant fire potential". That same day, local National Weather Service (NWS) forecasts noted the potential for intense fires and issued a Fire Weather Watch.

On January 3, the Storm Prediction Center (SPC) forecast a critical risk of fire weather that would occur on January 8 and that of January 7 on January 5. By January 7, on the first day of critical fire weather in the area, the SPC forecasted an extremely critical risk for Fire Weather for January 8. Subsequent days since January 9 up to January 15 have had at least a critical fire weather risk issued for Southern California, with January 13–14 having back to back Extremely Critical Fire Risks. On January 17, they issued a Critical Fire Risk for January 20–21, with the former upgraded to Extremely Critical Risk by January 19, the latter also upgraded to Extremely Critical by January 20. Later on January 20, the SPC also forecasted Critical fire weather for January 22–23.

The NWS issued a red flag warning, denoting the most extreme fire danger, for Los Angeles and Ventura counties, calling it a "particularly dangerous situation" that posed high risk to life and property. The warning emphasized that fires could rapidly grow due to powerful winds and low humidity. Southern California had become increasingly arid since late summer 2024, with storm systems predominantly affecting the Pacific Northwest and Northern California instead, as a result of the El Niño–Southern Oscillation (ENSO) shifting from El Niño to La Niña. La Niña conditions had emerged over the tropical Pacific Ocean by December 2024. By late December 2024, most of Los Angeles County had entered moderate drought status, creating heightened fire vulnerability due to desiccated vegetation in what was traditionally the region's wet season.

The Los Angeles Fire Department (LAFD) has been criticized for not using aerial thermal imaging using drones or aircraft to detect any underground smoldering areas after the Lachman Fire. This has been recommended by some as standard protocol for any fires larger than 1 acre. Thermal imaging may have detected smoldering areas underground or under dense vegetation that may eventually rekindle into a new fire (as it did in the Palisades Fire). The LAFD was also criticized for not pre-deploying any fire engines to the Palisades area on January 7, despite the NWS issuing an extreme fire danger alert.

=== Severe drought ===
Dry vegetation exacerbated the dangerous conditions, with many parts of Southern California experiencing severe drought, the driest start to the rainy season on record, and the driest nine-month period on record before the start of the wind event and subsequent fires.

According to a study published in Nature Reviews Earth & Environment, climate change in the region has both increased temperatures and created volatility in rainfall levels. Droughts punctuated by periods of heavy rain, such as the rainy seasons in 2022–23 and 2023–24, result in the sudden growth of grasses, shrubs, and trees that rapidly dry out and remain as fuel for wildfires. Climate change, according to research published in Environmental Research Letters, has made the hot and dry weather more likely to overlap with the offshore wind season, creating favorable conditions for wildfires. Lengthy dry seasons also reduced local water supplies and the number of safe days to carry out controlled burns—which reduce fuel before fire season starts—creating additional challenges for firefighting.

A study conducted by scientists at the Institut Pierre Simon Laplace attributed the intensified fire conditions primarily to anthropogenic climate change with natural climate variability playing a minor role, after determining that meteorological conditions in the impacted areas exhibited marked differences from similar events occurring between 1950 and 1986. These included warmer temperatures of up to 5 °C (9.0 °F), precipitation decreases of up to 15%, increases of wind speeds by up to 5 km/h (roughly 20%), and urban temperature increases of up to 3 °C (5.4 °F). Additionally, as climate change made the wildfire season in California longer, it further overlapped with the season of Santa Ana winds (October–January). With these severe drought conditions and exacerbation by climate change, these destructive firestorms are becoming more and more frequent, with California heading towards a year-round fire season. Analysis from Climate Central and World Weather Attribution also found that climate change strongly increased the likelihood of the wildfires by multiple ways.

=== Winds ===
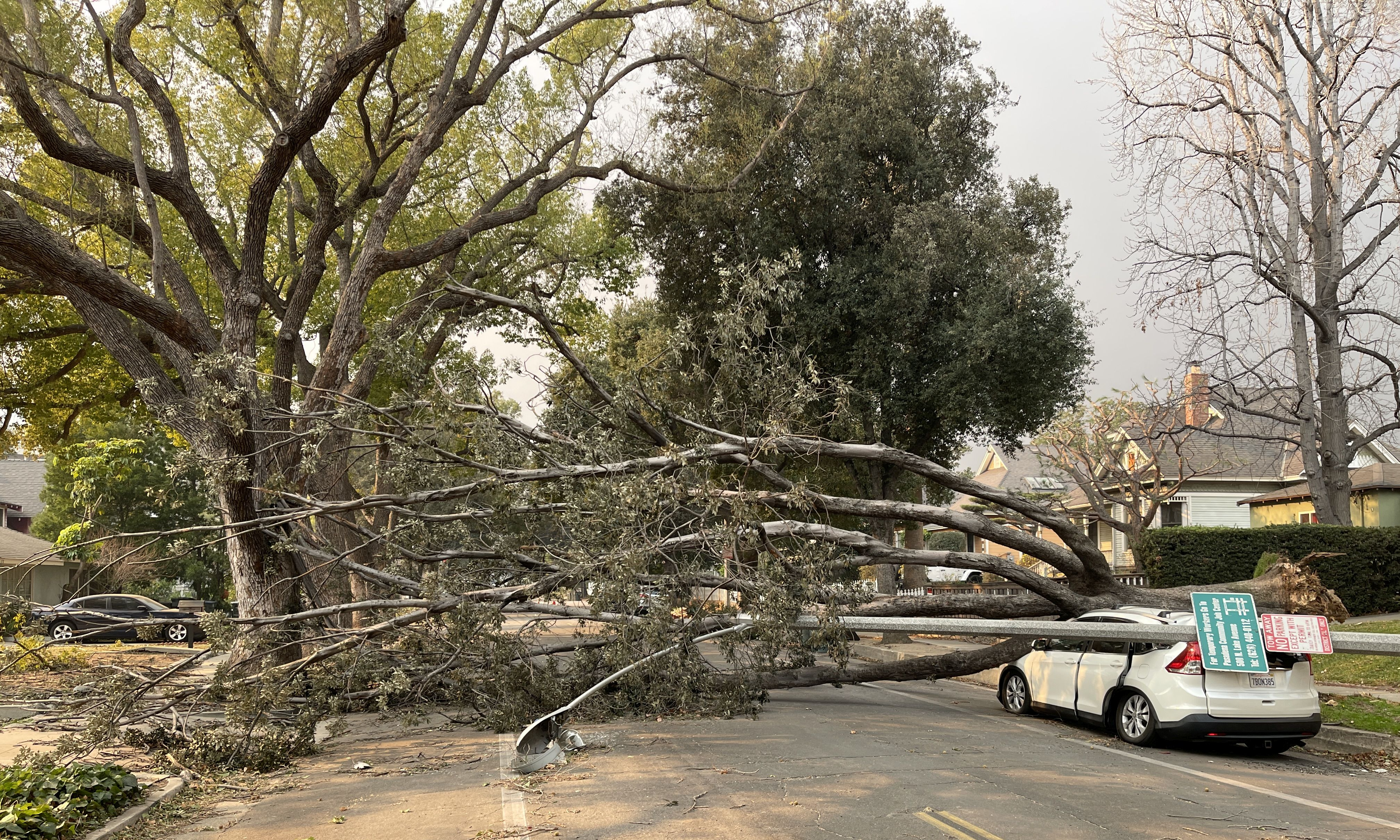
Toppled tree and lamp post in Pasadena

The events included Santa Ana winds of exceptional intensity, with forecasted gusts reaching 50 to 80 miles per hour (80 to 130 km/h; 22 to 36 m/s) in populated areas of the Los Angeles and Ventura counties, including the San Gabriel Valley and the Los Angeles Basin which in prior wind events had been protected by their lower elevations. Higher elevations were predicted to experience even more extreme conditions, with wind speeds anticipated from 80 to 100 mph (130 to 160 km/h; 36 to 45 m/s). As the jet stream crossed mountain ranges in Southern California from north to south, mountain waves developed, accelerating wind speeds as air descended into the Los Angeles Basin and other nearby lowlands.

The NWS Los Angeles office described the windstorm as potentially "life-threatening", predicting that winds would "accelerate to dangerous levels" beginning on the afternoon of January 7, and would last through early January 8 for Southern California. The NWS warned that the "destructive" winds would likely result in widespread power outages and downed trees. It predicted that it would be the region's "most destructive windstorm seen since 2011". By the morning of January 7, the NWS reported wind speeds of 84 mph (135 km/h; 38 m/s) on Magic Mountain Truck Trail in Santa Clarita, 62 mph (100 km/h; 28 m/s) in Escondido Canyon, and 55 mph (89 km/h; 25 m/s) at the Van Nuys Airport. The NWS reported at 6:19 p.m. that the windstorm could become Southern California's strongest wind event of 2025, especially in its valleys. US agency NOAA anticipated that wind speeds would be between 35 and 50 mph (56 and 80 km/h; 16 and 22 m/s). Wind gusts were recorded at 100 mph (160 km/h; 45 m/s) on Mount Lukens in the eastern San Gabriel Mountains and at 98 mph (158 km/h; 44 m/s) in the Santa Monica Mountains.

On January 11, at 1:06 p.m. PST, the NWS Los Angeles/Oxnard office issued a red flag warning for most Los Angeles and Ventura counties effective from 6 p.m. January 11 to 6 p.m. January 15, citing the re-intensification of Santa Ana winds and continued dry humidity. The office also issued a wind advisory from 7:04 p.m. PST to January 12 at 2 p.m., predicting sustained 20 to 30 mph (32 to 48 km/h; 8.9 to 13 m/s) northeast winds with 45 miles per hour (72 km/h) gusts and isolated 55 miles per hour (89 km/h) gusts. On January 12, the NWS announced a Particularly Dangerous Situation Red Flag Warning from 4 a.m. on January 14 to 12 noon on January 15 for several regions in the Los Angeles and Ventura counties. The PDS warning was issued for predicted damaging northeastern and eastern wind gusts between 55 and 70 miles per hour (89 and 113 km/h) with continued low humidity conditions, which the report stated could lead to "extreme fire behavior" and "long range spotting".

=== Human contributing factors ===
==== Single-family zoning ====
For many decades, single-family zoning caused the demand for housing in the Los Angeles area to be realized as a suburban sprawl of houses at the wildland–urban interface, rather than as increased housing density in centrally located neighborhoods that are less prone to destructive fires. At the same time, many Los Angeles suburbs had been repeatedly rebuilt after previous destructive wildfires in the same locations and with the same conditions that facilitated those fires.

==== Local firefighting budgets ====
The budget for the Los Angeles Fire Department (LAFD), one of several departments fighting the fires, was reduced by $17.6 million, or two percent, for the fiscal year 2024‍–‍2025. On December 4, 2024, LA Fire Chief Kristin Crowley said that the reduction has "adversely affected the Department's ability to maintain core operations" and that the $7 million reduction in overtime hours "severely limited the Department's capacity to prepare for, train for, and respond to large-scale emergencies" and affected inspections of residences and brush clearance. After the budget was passed, another $111 million in pay raises and equipment was added, thereby increasing the operating budget from the previous year.

Simultaneously, the price and length of delays for firefighting vehicles significantly increased in recent years due to corporate concentration. Multiple major fire departments across the United States are reporting difficulties with acquiring new fire trucks due to price increases.

==== Construction management ====
Fire scientists say the destructive power of wildfires multiplied because older homes ignited one after the other. The California building code requires all homes in high-risk areas to use materials that are less likely to burn. However, in the Palisades neighborhood, many of the homes, being built in the 1950s and 1960s, did not comply with the modern building code. Older homes are more likely to be constructed with wood, include more surrounding vegetation, and be closer to other homes.

==== Electric grid ====
Robert McCullough, an electric utility consultant, has argued that the LA electrical grid was designed to withstand wind speeds of up to 56 miles per hour (90 km/h), stating that it is "quite low in today's climate". McCullough further criticized the Los Angeles Department of Water and Power (LADWP) for not having a system to shut off power in urban areas ahead of time when there is a high risk of wildfires.

==== Water supplies ====
According to the New York Times, as wildfires roared into residential neighborhoods, the firefighters ran out of water. Officials say the storage tanks that hold water for high-elevation areas like the Highlands, and the pumping systems that feed them, could not keep pace with the demand. The pump-and-storage system was designed for a fire that might consume several homes, not one that would consume hundreds, said Marty Adams, former chief engineer at the LADWP. Professor Greg Pierce, a scientist at the University of California, Los Angeles, further stated that most water systems were designed for fighting urban fires, not fast-moving wildfires.

After flames leveled nearly 500 homes in Bel Air and Brentwood in the 1961 wildfire, the Santa Ynez Reservoir was constructed, a 117 million US gallons (440,000 m^{3}; 440,000,000 L) water reservoir located in the upper Pacific Palisades. However, on January 7, the Santa Ynez Reservoir had been completely emptied to repair a tear in its cover. The tear was first noticed by a Department of Water employee in January 2024, and the DWP was originally planning to have it repaired and back in use by April 2024. Former and current DWP officials said that if the reservoir had not been empty, the Palisades would have had higher water pressure. Former LADWP General Manager Martin Adams stated that the repair operations had been going on "for a while", and that officials typically maintained lower water levels in the reservoir during winter months to prevent water stagnation and associated issues with chemical concentrations and bacterial growth.

== Preparations ==
On January 6, California governor Gavin Newsom stated he would assign 65 fire engines, 7 helicopters, 7 water tenders, and 109 workers to fighting wildfires that arose. Mayor of Los Angeles Karen Bass warned residents that the windstorm could become one of the harshest in more than a decade, and cautioned them to avoid wind-downed power lines. As Bass was out of the country for the inauguration of Ghanaian president John Mahama, Council President Marqueece Harris-Dawson filled in as acting mayor.

Southern California Edison, the area's primary electricity provider, proposed to cut off power to some customers to prevent faulty equipment from starting fires; officials anticipated that up to 400,000 of its 5 million customers could see power disruptions. San Diego Gas & Electric also stated that it would cut power before the onset of extreme weather.

Santa Monica-Malibu Unified School District said that it would close all its schools in Malibu for January 7 "due to worsening weather conditions and safety concerns". Los Angeles Unified School District stated that it would temporarily move several Pacific Palisades schools and limit outdoor activities to protect against wind. Sections of Pacific Coast Highway were closed because severe winds threatened traffic. In advance of the potential wildfires, the 114 tanks making up Los Angeles's water infrastructure were filled. NIFC raised its National Preparedness Level to 2, allowing for the initial deployment of federal assets.

== Lead-up ==
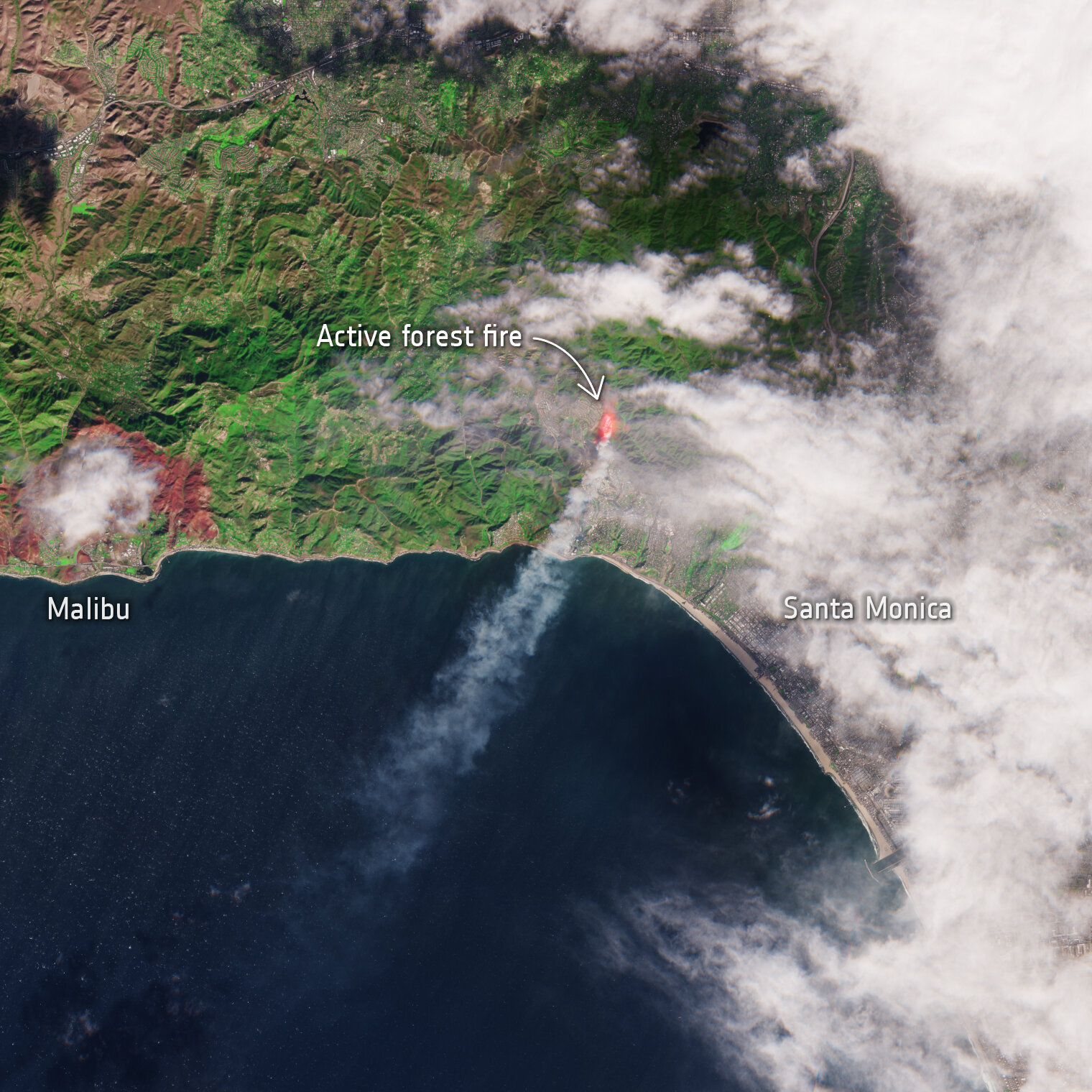
Satellite image of the Palisades fire on January 7 at 10:36 a.m. local time, shortly after it had broken out

On January 1st, LAFD teams extinguishing the Lachman Fire reported to their battalion commander that the ground was still smoldering and rocks were hot to the touch, suggesting that underground fires were still burning. The battalion commander ordered the firefighters to leave the scene despite their concerns. This fire (The Lachman Fire) would re-kindle on January 7th and become the Palisades Fire fueled by heavy Santa Ana winds. Despite very heavy winds and an extremely high fire-risk index, the city of Los Angeles had only pre-deployed 9 fire engines on January 6 with a further 8 the following morning throughout the city, with no engines pre-deployed to the Palisades. As the winds began to blow on January 7, the City of Los Angeles declared a state of emergency in anticipation of heightening winds. The South Coast Air Quality Management District (AQMD) issued a dust storm warning for several counties in Southern California, warning that the harsh winds could blow dust and soil into the air.

A news conference held by United States President Joe Biden in Coachella Valley to sign proclamations for the Chuckwalla National Monument and the Sáttítla Highlands National Monument was canceled for excessive winds. Dozens of trees were downed throughout the San Gabriel Valley, including in Pasadena. At midday, the event left more than 20,000 customers without power. For the third time in three months, Southern California Edison shut off power to certain areas to reduce the chance that electrical equipment might ignite additional fires. These preventative measures left thousands more without power.

Several flights were delayed by the intensity of the winds, with pilots being warned not to fly close to terrain. The Federal Aviation Administration ordered a temporary stop to ground activities at the Hollywood Burbank Airport, following strong wind gusts forcing multiple go-arounds. Southwest Airlines diverted or canceled several flights for strong winds present at Ontario and Burbank airports.

== List of major wildfires ==
Name	County	Area	Start date	Containment date (Note: Containment means that fire crews have established and secured control lines around the fire's perimeter. These lines are artificial barriers, like trenches or cleared vegetation, designed to stop the fire's spread, or natural barriers like rivers. Containment reflects progress in managing the fire but does not necessarily mean the fire is starved of fuel, under control, or put out.)	Structures damaged or destroyed	Notes	Ref.
Riverside	San Bernardino	1 acre (0.40 ha)	January 7	January 7	"Multiple"	Several vehicles and multiple makeshift residences burned	
Palisades	Los Angeles	23,448 acres (9,489 ha)	January 7	January 31	7,854	Evacuations; homes destroyed in Pacific Palisades, northwest of Santa Monica	
Eaton	Los Angeles	14,021 acres (5,674 ha)	January 7	January 31	10,491	Evacuations; structures destroyed in Altadena and Pasadena	
Bert	Los Angeles	3 acres (1.2 ha)	January 7	January 7	At least 10	Possibly involved structures in Pasadena neighborhoods	
Hurst	Los Angeles	799 acres (323 ha)	January 7	January 16	Unknown	Evacuations; homes possibly destroyed in Sylmar	
Olivas	Ventura	28 acres (11 ha)	January 8	January 8	At least 3	In and around Santa Clara River in Ventura	
Lidia	Los Angeles	395 acres (160 ha)	January 8	January 11	Unknown	Fire south of Acton	
Sunset	Los Angeles	43 acres (17 ha)	January 8	January 9	"Several"	Evacuations; began in Hollywood Hills	
Sunswept	Los Angeles	0.5 acres (0.20 ha)	January 8	January 8	At least 1	Small vegetation fire involved with structures in Studio City	
Kenneth	Los Angeles/Ventura	1,052 acres (426 ha)	January 9	January 12	Unknown	Evacuations; began west of West Hills, arson suspect arrested and released	
Lilac	San Diego	85 acres (34 ha)	January 21	January 22	4		
Hughes	Los Angeles/Ventura	10,425 acres (4,219 ha)	January 22	January 30	None	Evacuations; began near Castaic Lake	
Laguna	Ventura	93.5 acres (37.8 ha)	January 23	January 26	None	Evacuations of CSU Channel Islands; began near Laguna Road in Camarillo	
Border 2	San Diego	6,625 acres (2,681 ha)	January 23	January 30	None	Fire that burned in the Otay Mountain Wilderness	

== Wildfires ==
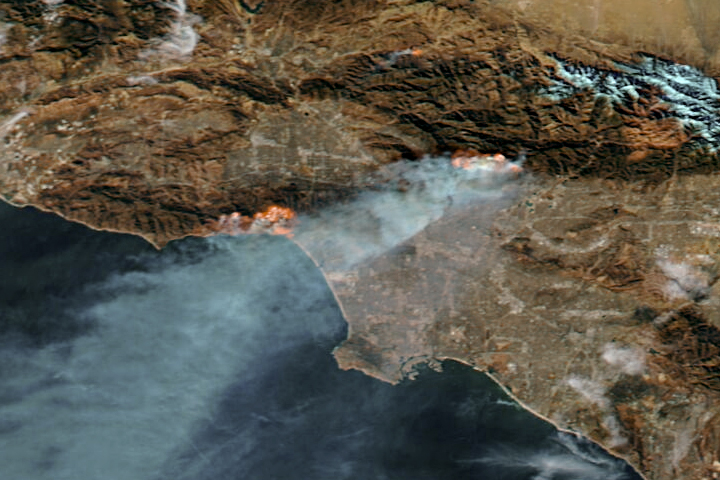
False-color Aqua satellite imagery of the Palisades, Hurst, and Eaton fires, January 8, 21:40 GMT/1:40 p.m. PST.

The extreme intensity of the windstorm (peak gusts were 100 mph (161 km/h) at the Mount Lukens Truck Trail in the eastern San Gabriel Mountains) coupled with dry vegetation due to prolonged drought conditions caused fires to spread rapidly, and airborne embers set spot fires far away.

=== Palisades Fire ===
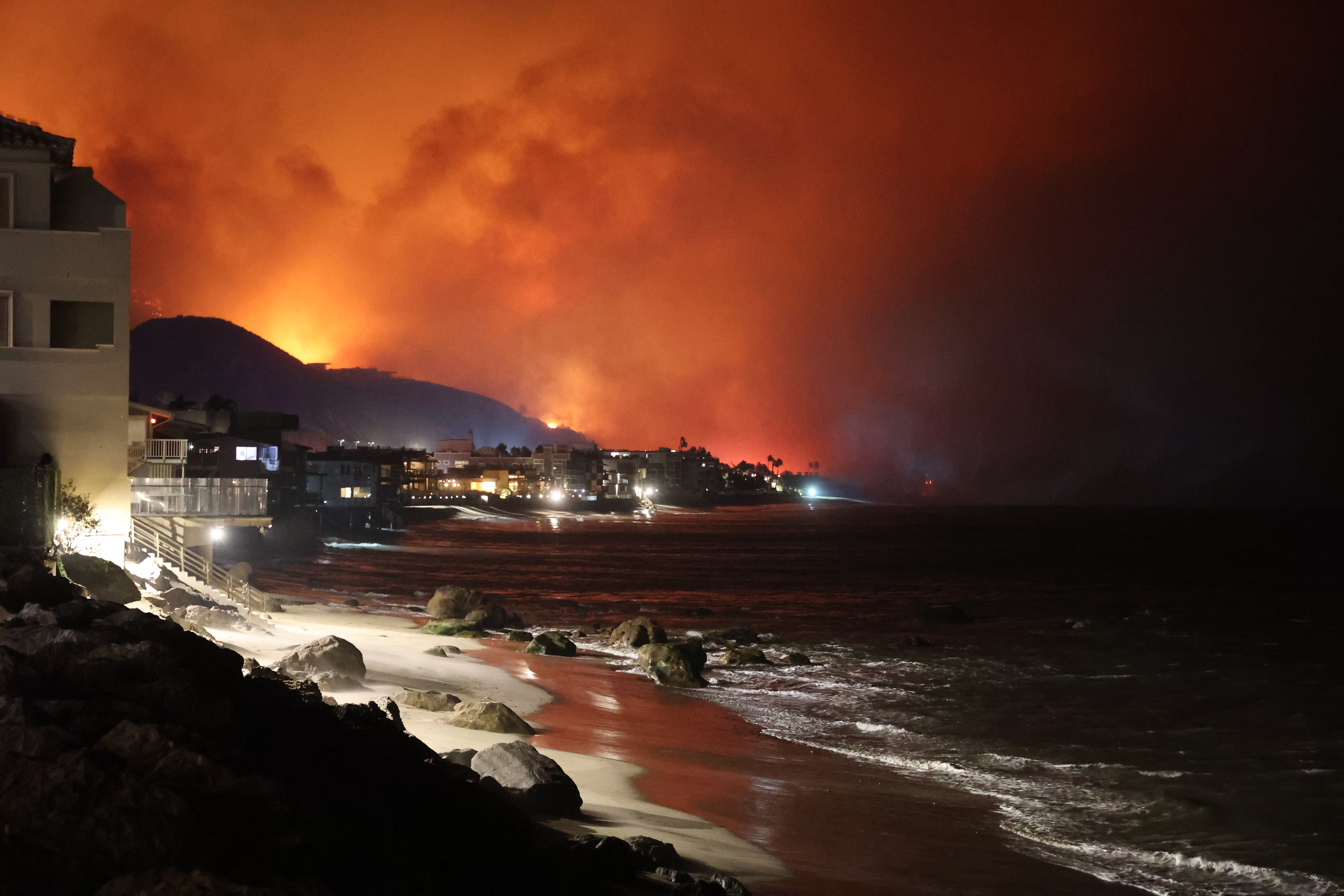
The Palisades Fire viewed from the shoreline on January 8.

The Palisades Fire ignited on January 7 near the Pacific Palisades neighborhood in Los Angeles, rapidly expanding to encompass 5,000 acres (2,000 ha; 7.8 sq mi; 20 km^{2}). It was first reported at around 10:30 a.m. PST, covering about 10 acres (4.0 ha) of mountains north of the Pacific Palisades neighborhood. It began to quickly spread. Officials ordered mandatory evacuations along sections of the Pacific Coast Highway and surrounding areas; the Westwood Recreation Center served as an emergency shelter. During midday, firefighters reported that strong winds were causing the fire to grow by "three football fields of land per minute". Immediate evacuation orders were issued for residents of Santa Monica living north of San Vicente Boulevard. At 12:12 p.m. PST on January 8, the City of Malibu urged all remaining residents to evacuate in the face of the uncontrolled fire. Evacuation orders were given for the LA neighborhood of Brentwood. Human remains were found in a destroyed house in Malibu during a welfare check.

On January 10, evacuation orders were extended into Tarzana and Encino in the San Fernando Valley. On January 24, 23,448 acres of land were destroyed by the fire; with 79 percent of the fire contained. As of January 28, the Palisades Fire has been confirmed to have destroyed 6,837 homes and other structures and burned a total of 23,448 acres. As of the latest reports from the California Department of Forestry and Fire Protection (CAL FIRE), damage assessment teams are nearing completion of their inspections. The fire was then reported to be 100 percent contained on January 31 by CAL FIRE.

=== Eaton Fire ===
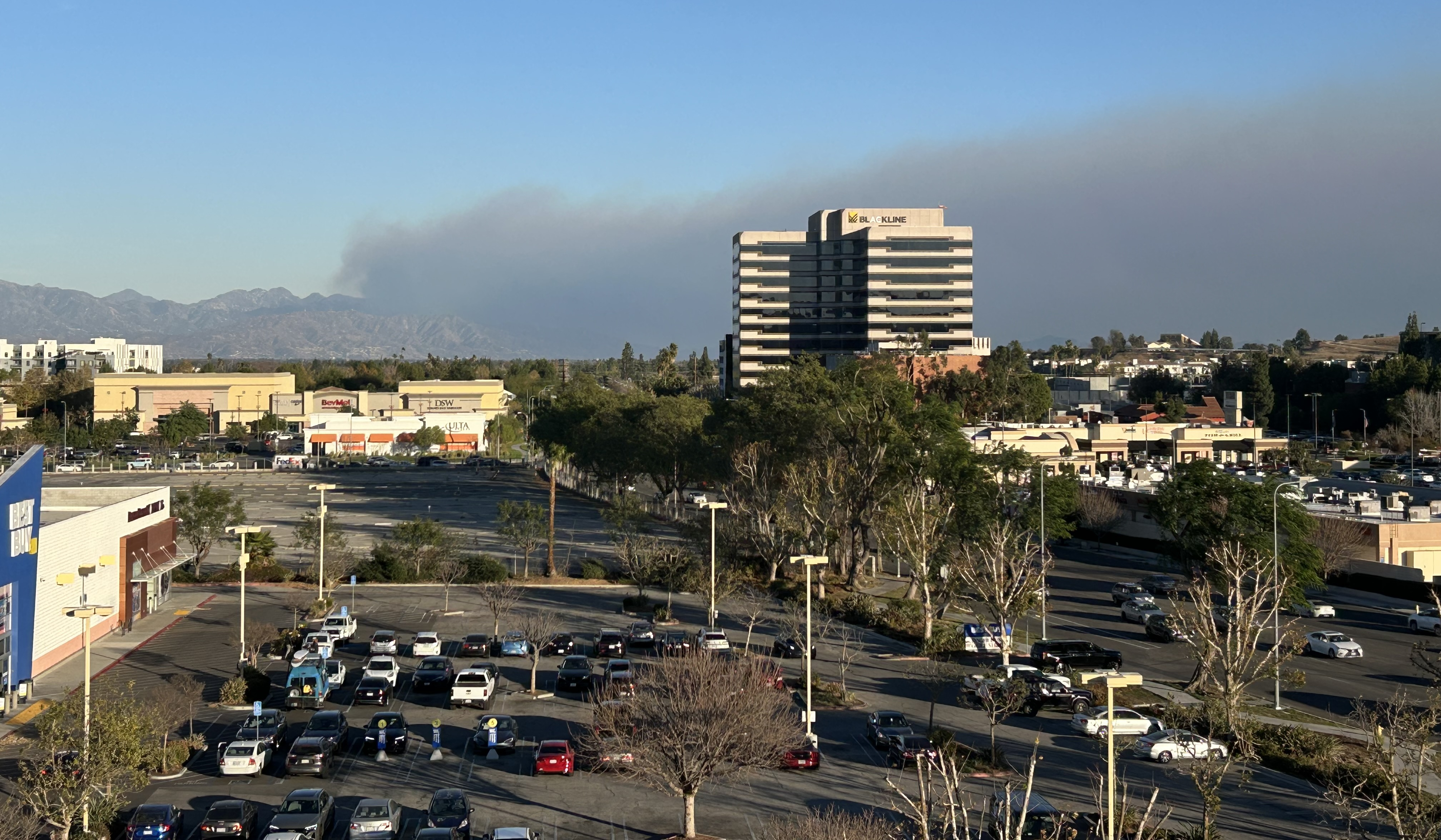
The Eaton Fire viewed from Woodland Hills, Los Angeles

Shortly after January 7 at 6:15 p.m. PST, a brush fire in Eaton Canyon in the Altadena–Pasadena region, dubbed the Eaton Fire, was first reported with an area of 20 acres (8.1 ha; 0.031 sq mi; 0.081 km^{2}). According to Pasadena Now, residents next to the canyon told emergency services that a nearby electrical tower was on fire. By 7:12 p.m., the fire had grown to at least 200 acres (81 ha; 0.31 sq mi; 0.81 km^{2}) in size. Los Angeles County Fire Captain Sheila Kelliher said the winds would continue to cause the fire to grow rapidly. Within six hours, the Eaton Fire had grown to 1,000 acres (400 ha; 1.6 sq mi; 4.0 km^{2}). The Terraces at Park Marino evacuated 95 senior citizens, with images showing many in wheelchairs and wearing only gowns. Evacuations were later expanded in Pasadena and in northern Sierra Madre and Arcadia. The AltaMed Medical Center and several residences in Hastings Ranch were "engulfed in flames". By January 8 at 10:36 a.m. PST, the fire had grown to 10,600 acres (4,300 ha; 16.6 sq mi; 43 km^{2}). At midday, the fire began to advance into residential zones of Pasadena. All of La Cañada Flintridge was ordered to evacuate. At least five people had died in the fire. In the afternoon of January 9, the Eaton Fire began to approach Mount Wilson. On January 18, the fire was 65% contained, with 17 deaths reported from the fires. The Eaton Fire was reported to have been 100 percent contained on January 31.

=== Hurst Fire ===
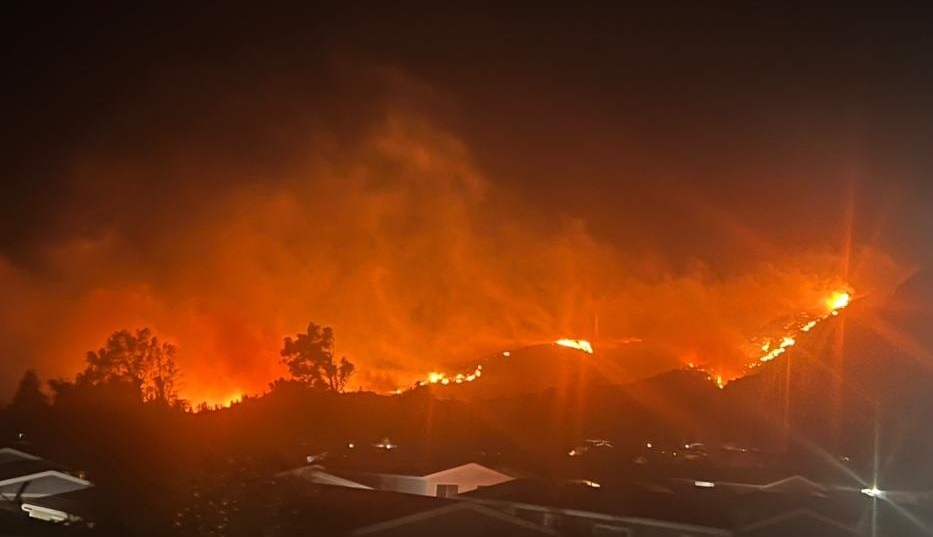
View of the Hurst Fire immediately northeast of San Fernando on January 7

The Hurst Fire started at around 10:10 p.m. PST on January 7 and spread to 50 acres (20 ha) within 10 minutes, growing to 100 acres (40 ha) in its first 30 minutes. It instituted immediate evacuation orders for all areas north of the Foothill Freeway between Roxford Street and the Golden State Freeway–Antelope Valley Freeway split. By 1:00 a.m. January 8, the fire was estimated to have spread to about 300 acres (120 ha), and by 1:49 a.m., the fire had spread to about 500 acres (200 ha), largely within the footprint of the 2019 Saddleridge Fire. The fire was fully contained on January 16 after burning 799 acres (323 ha; 3.23 km^{2}; 1.248 sq mi). More than 44,000 people were given evacuation orders, with a further 27,000 receiving evacuation warnings.

=== Kenneth Fire ===
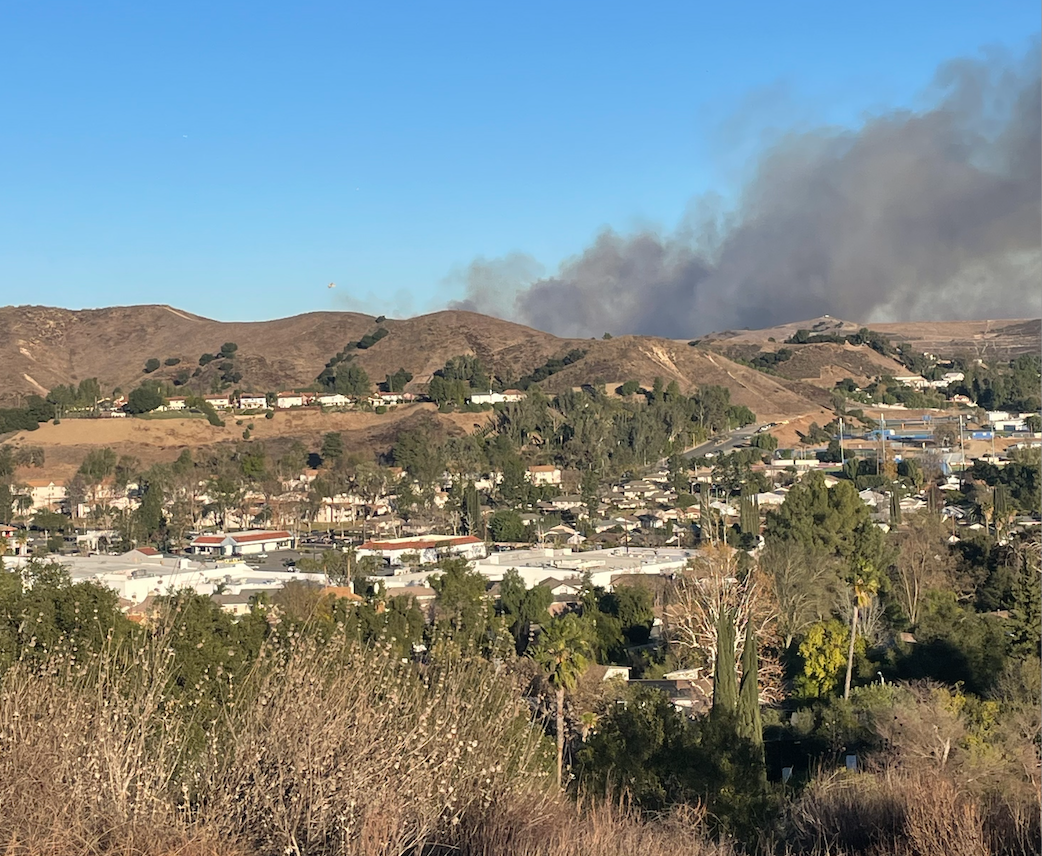
Smoke from the Kenneth Fire on January 10

The Kenneth Fire was first reported on January 9 at 2:30 p.m. PST, igniting along a trailhead near Victory Boulevard in the West Hills neighborhood of Los Angeles. The fire quickly grew to 50 acres (20 ha; 0.078 sq mi; 0.20 km^{2}). Resources from both Los Angeles County and Ventura County were requested. Mandatory evacuations were ordered for the area from Vanowen Street south to Burbank Boulevard and from County Lane Road east to Valley Circle Boulevard. Additional evacuation warnings were ordered for areas east of Valley Circle and for parts of Oak Park. By 5:30 p.m. PST, the fire had grown to at least 960 acres (390 ha; 1.50 sq mi; 3.9 km^{2}) and was approaching suburbs in Calabasas and Hidden Hills. Soon after, governor Newsom announced the deployment of 900 additional firefighters to the area. The cause of the fire is being investigated.

On the same day, an evacuation warning was mistakenly issued for the entirety of Los Angeles County rather than an area specific to the Kenneth fire and was subsequently sent out to cellphones across the county as a wireless emergency alert message to nearly 10 million LA-area residents; County Supervisor Janice Hahn later confirmed that the alerts were accidental, with a follow-up correction alert being sent. On January 10, Los Angeles County suspended the use of Genasys in favor of the California Governor's Office of Emergency Services (Cal OES). The fire was 100 percent contained on January 12 after burning 1,052 acres (426 ha; 1.644 sq mi; 4.26 km^{2}) of land.

=== Hughes Fire ===
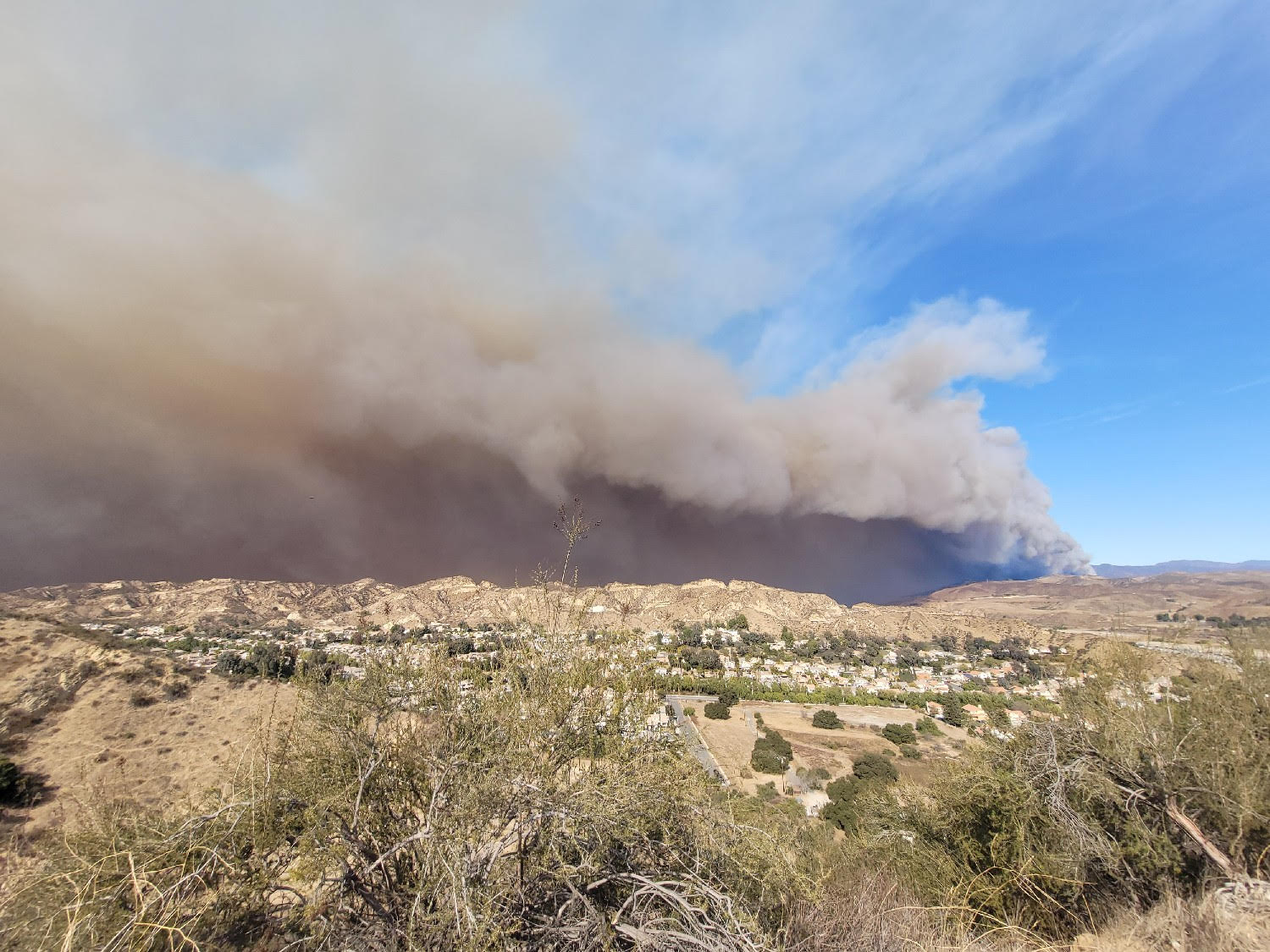
The Hughes Fire at 12:45 p.m. on January 22

The Hughes Fire was first reported on January 22 at 10:42 a.m. PST, to the east of Castaic Lake in northern Los Angeles County. By 12:30 p.m., the wildfire had grown to over 3,400 acres (1,400 ha) with zero containment, and triggered mandatory evacuations for settlements near the lake including Castaic. By January 23, the fire was 36 percent contained. On January 30, the Hughes Fire was reported to be 100 percent contained after burning 10,425 acres (4,219 ha; 42.19 km^{2}; 16.289 sq mi). At its height, over 30,000 people were under evacuation orders, with a further 20,000 under evacuation warnings.

=== Border 2 Fire ===
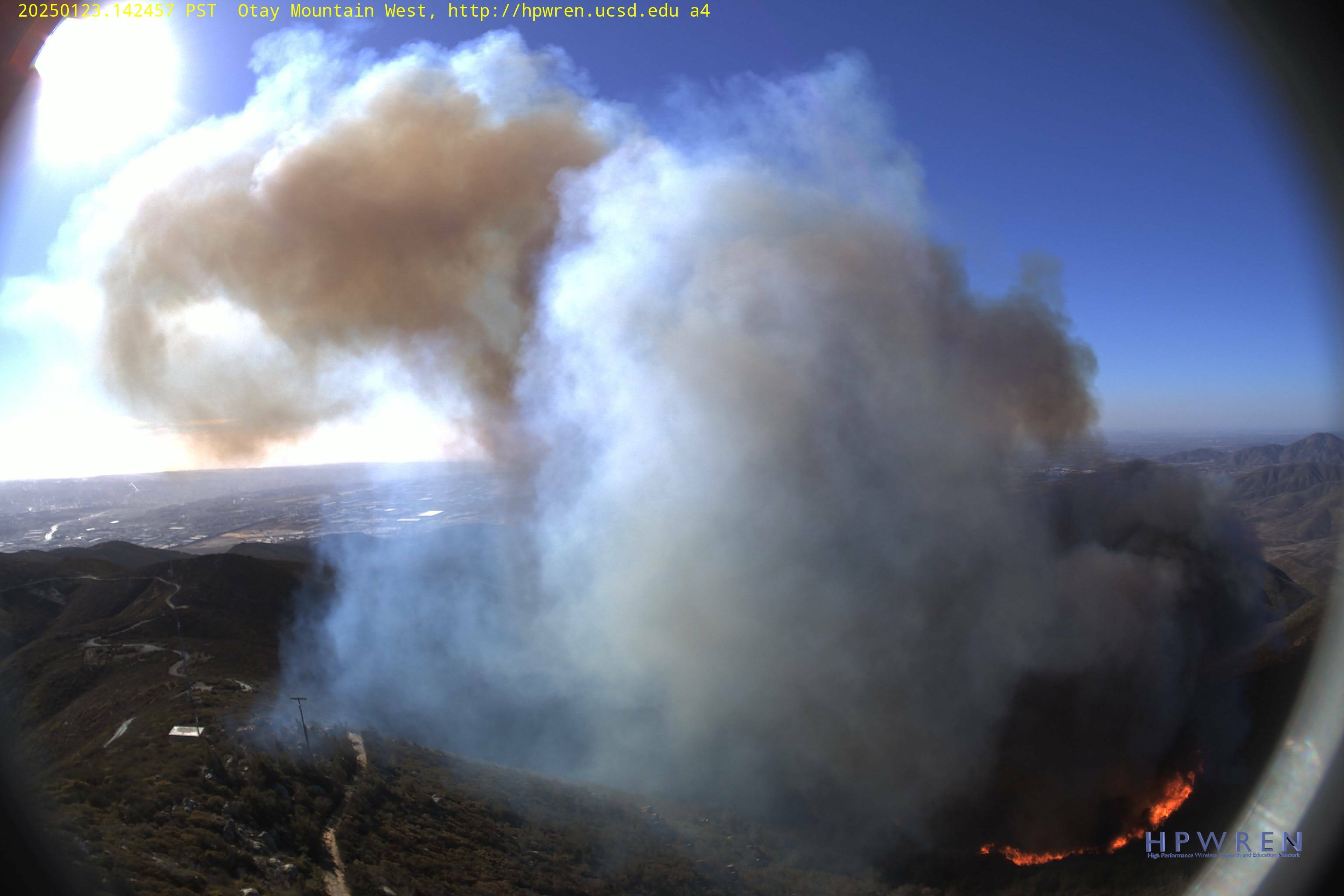
The Border 2 Fire viewed from a HPWREN camera

The Border 2 Fire started at 2:31 p.m. PST on January 23 and burned 6,625 acres (2,681 ha; 27 km^{2}; 10 sq mi) in the Otay Mountain Wilderness before it was contained on January 30. No damage or injuries were reported. Many schools were closed and numerous evacuation orders were issued.

== Impact ==
Around 200,000 people have been put under evacuation orders. On January 21, around 88,000 people were put under evacuation orders, with another 84,800 in evacuation warning zones throughout Los Angeles County. According to Los Angeles County Sheriff Robert Luna, around 470 inmates from a county jail in Castaic were evacuated.

=== Deaths and injuries ===
As of July 3, 30 deaths were attributed to the wildfires. Of those, 18 were attributed to the Eaton Fire and 12 to the Palisades Fire. The number made the Eaton Fire the deadliest and most destructive in terms of the number of destroyed or damaged buildings named wildfire in the incident out of the other recognized fires. These figures represent the 5th and 14th deadliest fires in the history of California, respectively.

67-year-old Anthony Mitchell and his son Justin Mitchell were both victims of the Eaton Fire in Altadena. Both were found by Justin's bed, possibly due to Anthony attempting to save him. Several burn injuries were reported, and a 25-year-old firefighter suffered a serious head injury. At about 9 p.m. PST, many burn victims walked towards Duke's Malibu restaurant, where they were then medically treated and transferred to hospitals. Rory Sykes, a 32-year-old British and Australian citizen with cerebral palsy, died of carbon monoxide poisoning during the Palisades Fire, which destroyed his cottage on his mother's Malibu estate. He was not initially counted among the death toll pending the discovery of his remains. His mother, Shelley Sykes told the press that failed emergency calls and the need to leave the property to alert firefighters delayed the response, blaming local infrastructure issues for the death. LA County Sheriff Robert Luna reported on January 9 that the scale of the number of fatalities would be better determined once canine and forensic searches could be thoroughly implemented. Filmmaker David Lynch, who was already in poor health, died shortly after evacuating his home due to the Sunset Fire.

The official death toll from the January 2025 wildfires in Los Angeles County lists just 31 fatalities, but a new study estimates the actual number is closer to 440. The extra deaths aren't just from flames; the smoke, air-pollution exposure, disrupted healthcare, and stress on the system played a part in the excess mortality.

=== Structural damage and cultural losses ===
Wildfire Alliance statistics indicated that the Palisades fire alone was by far the most destructive in the Los Angeles region, with at least 1,000 structures destroyed, surpassing the Sayre Fire, which destroyed 604 structures in 2008, and the Bel Air Fire, which destroyed nearly 500 houses in 1961. The Reel Inn, a 36-year-old seafood restaurant, was confirmed by its owners to have been destroyed in the Palisades Fire. The Palisades Charter High School was engulfed by the fire after the wildfire reached the site at roughly 4 p.m. PST. No one was in the school due to it being out for winter break. Vegetation and trees near the Getty Villa burned, with no structural damage being reported as of 5:20 p.m. PST, January 7.

On January 8, more than 9,300 structures were reported destroyed. The fire later spread to the Palisades Charter Elementary School. Several beachfront properties in Malibu were destroyed by the wildfire. Dozens of cars abandoned on highways during evacuations were completely burnt, with bulldozers having to force several vehicles out of the way for firefighters to access burning areas. The fires destroyed the Pasadena Jewish Temple and Center, the Masjid Al-Taqwa, and the Altadena Community Church. The Belmont Music Publishers company, owned by Larry Schoenberg, son of 20th-century classical composer Arnold Schoenberg, was destroyed in the Palisades fire, resulting in the destruction of 100,000 Schoenberg-composed scores and letters, photographs, books, arrangements, and other Schoenberg memorabilia.

CBS News journalist Jonathan Vigliotti reported that "most everything is gone" in downtown Pacific Palisades aside from the local mall, and described the damage as "beyond comprehension". He also reported that embers from existing fires were being "blown more than a mile" by the severe windstorm and creating spot fires. The Malibu Feed Bin and Theater Palisades' Pierson Playhouse were destroyed in the Palisades fire. The Eaton Canyon Nature Center was destroyed in the Eaton Fire, resulting in the deaths of about fifteen lizards. On January 11, the California Department of Forestry and Fire Protection reported that more than 12,000 buildings was threatened by the fires and that "It is expected that more than 5,000 structures have been destroyed". On January 16, EPA has begun assessing burned properties in the Eaton and Palisades fires with California Department of Toxic Substances Control.

Multiple celebrities' houses burned down in the wildfires, including the homes of Jhené Aiko, Tyra Banks, Eric Braeden, Jeff Bridges, Adam Brody, Barbara Corcoran, Billy Crystal, Cary Elwes, Empress Of, Mel Gibson, Dawes member Griffin Goldsmith, John Goodman, Bryan Greenburg, Harvey Guillén, Yolanda Hadid, Ed Harris, Fat Tony, Jennifer Love Hewitt, Paris Hilton, Anthony Hopkins, Joe Lando, Taran Killam, Ricki Lake, Sandra Lee, Eugene Levy, Julia Louis-Dreyfus, Cameron Mathison, Leighton Meester, Mandy Moore, Brad Paisley, Photay, John C. Reilly, Josh Ruben, Zachary Cole Smith, Cobie Smulders, Candy Spelling, Carel Struycken, Miles Teller, Milo Ventimiglia, and Diane Warren. Madlib's home in Los Angeles was also reportedly burned down, with the producer losing "decades of music and equipment" in the process; a Donorbox crowdfunding campaign was subsequently started to help him and his family. John Legend and Chrissy Teigen, Billy Corgan and Rage Against the Machine, and Audioslave drummer Brad Wilk were among those who were reportedly evacuated with their families. Former US swimmer Gary Hall Jr. said he lost his ten Olympic medals (including five gold medals) in the fire, Los Angeles Lakers head coach JJ Redick confirmed that he also lost his home, while a mansion in Malibu owned by South Korean baseball player Chan Ho Park since 1999 was also reportedly destroyed. The historic home and ranch of humorist Will Rogers was also destroyed. A home once belonging to Ryan O'Neal also burned down.

Affected area of Pacific Palisades (map data)	Affected area of Altadena (map data)

=== Economic impact ===
According to JPMorgan Chase estimates published on January 9, the insured losses from the fires were projected to exceed $20 billion, which would set a new record for wildfire-related insurance claims in US history. This figure would substantially surpass the previous record of $12.5 billion in insured damages set by the 2018 Camp Fire, as documented by Aon. A total economic loss of $50 billion was predicted by JPMorgan. JPMorgan noted that these figures could rise further due to the fires' continued spread and lack of containment. It was estimated that European reinsurance companies will also be impacted due to financial losses from wildfires, including Swiss Re, Hannover Re, and SCOR SE. According to Swiss Re, insured losses amounted to $40 billion, making these wildfires the costliest on record globally. By January 24, Accuweather had estimated the probable economic loss to be between $250 billion and $275 billion when factoring in the costs of damage, loss of life, healthcare, business disruptions and unspecified other economic impacts, according to the Los Angeles Times.

=== Housing ===
During the fires, LA-area landlords raised the cost of rent substantially by an average of 15–20%, with many rents almost doubling, causing many newly homeless to have difficulty finding somewhere to stay. This violated California price gouging laws, which prevented an increase of more than 10% during an emergency. Some hotels offered discounted rates for those displaced, while others increased their rates substantially even for those who had already booked. The destruction of a large number of homes is anticipated to further strain the housing supply in Southern California.

=== Power outages ===
By the night of January 7, nearly 50,000 customers suffered power outages, 28,300 under the Los Angeles Department of Water and Power and 21,699 under Southern California Edison (SCE). The number in the Los Angeles metropolitan area alone increased to over 200,000 by around 9:30 p.m. PST, with outages reported in Los Angeles, Glendale, Pasadena, and Burbank. SCE later stated that, at 4 p.m. PST on January 8, about 414,000 of its customers are without power and 454,000 customers are under a Public Safety Power Shutoff program watch. As of January 12, 2025, 35,000 customers were still left without electricity.

=== Air quality and health ===
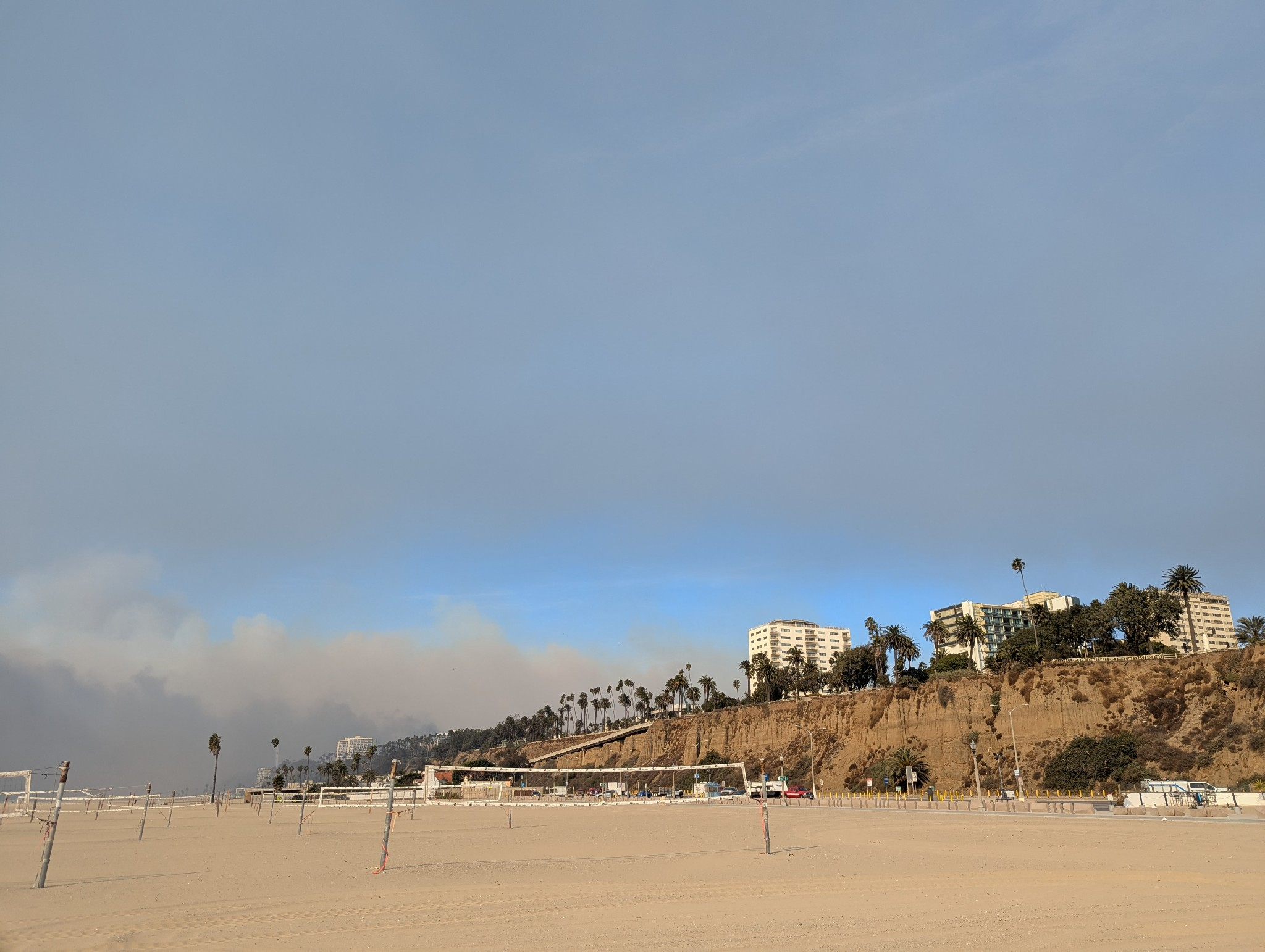
Wildfire smoke from the Southern California wildfires seen over Santa Monica State Beach, January 8, 2025

Winds blew wildfire smoke across Los Angeles, leading to several "very unhealthy" air quality index readings of over 200, with the PM2.5 of the Harrison ES station reaching 184.1 μg/m^{3}, or 36.8 times the annual World Health Organization guideline value. Air quality degraded to 569 μg/m^{3} in the region, representing the most hazardous category and necessitating avoidance of all outdoor activity. UCLA Health pulmonologist May-Lin Wilgus expected LA residents to suffer from burning eyes and irritation due to the concentrated smoke, and urged residents with underlying health conditions such as COPD and asthma to avoid all outdoor activity and to close all doors and windows while running air conditioning. Los Angeles City Council president Marqueece Harris-Dawson reported that visibility had fallen below one block in Southern Los Angeles, and urged residents to avoid driving when possible.

Additional monitoring data from the California Air Resources Board (CARB) recorded PM2.5 levels in hazardous ranges at multiple sites across Los Angeles County. The Los Angeles-North Main Street monitoring station registered a one-hour peak of 483.7 μg/m^{3}, while daily averages at several sites, including Compton (51.7 μg/m^{3}), North Hollywood (50.1 μg/m^{3}), and Reseda (47.0 μg/m^{3}), remained well above the U.S. Environmental Protection Agency (EPA) safety threshold of 35 μg/m^{3}. These readings highlight both the acute pollution spikes during the fires and the prolonged air quality deterioration in the days that followed.

The United States Department of Agriculture and the Los Angeles Department of Public Health warned that the wildfires can render some food in the nearby area unsafe to be eaten due to the smoke fumes and other chemicals. Carcinogens are common in smoke from urban fires and pose long-term health risks to those who inhale it, particularly firefighters without respiratory protection.

Environmental Protection Agency air quality data indicated that millions of Los Angeles area residents experienced severe air quality deterioration, with conditions reaching the "Unhealthy" category on EPA scales and escalating to "Hazardous" levels near the fire zones. The combustion of urban structures was estimated to have released numerous harmful substances that are not accounted for in PM2.5 readings, including heavy metals such as lead or zinc. Co-founder and chief meteorologist of Weather Underground Jeff Masters predicted that up to thousands of individuals could die prematurely due to even short-term exposure to the wildfires' smoke. Based on a 2024 study on long-term wildfire smoke exposure in the US, he also predicted that smoke exposure could cause several long-term effects in Californians, including reproductive, cardiovascular, respiratory, renal, endocrine, and neurodevelopmental disorders.

In February, CDC reported that a 110-fold increase in air lead levels during the 2025 LA fires was recorded. The built environment with painted surfaces, pipes, vehicles, plastics, electronic equipment, and buildings combusted, of which a large proportion had been built before 1978.

=== Soil and water contamination ===
Structures, cars, manmade objects, and other fixtures burned in the wildfires caused significant soil and water contamination. The Los Angeles Times reported that ocean sampling (conducted by the non-profit organization Heal the Bay) in coastal areas in Los Angeles County adjacent to the fire burn scar found elevated levels of heavy metals including lead, copper, chromium, nickel and beryllium. This sampling was conducted after heavy rains in late January 2025 caused runoff from the burn scar into the ocean. The elevated levels of heavy metals are expected to harm marine wildlife, but the levels were not believed to be high enough to directly harm humans. Levels of beryllim were ten-times over the level deemed safe.

The Los Angeles Times reported that properties directly burned in the Eaton and Palasades Fires, as well as homes in the smoke's path, had dangerously high levels of heavy metals. Researchers found that 36% of homes in the Eaton burn scar (both destroyed homes and homes that survived the fire), 47% of homes outside of the burn scar, and 70-80% of homes southwest of the Eaton fire (in the direction of winds) had elevated levels of lead. Other estimates showed that a third of all homes in the Eaton burn scar that were not damaged or destroyed by fire had elevated levels of lead in the soil. Other intact homes and burned sites tested in the Eaton and Palasides fires showed elevated levels of arsenic, cadmium and mercury. A small percentage of homes in the Altadena burn area, 0.5%, had lead levels 12 times over the safe limit, qualifying the soil as hazardous waste. High levels of lead were found in 49% of burn sites that were remediated by the United States Army Corps of Engineers and the Federal Emergency Management Agency (FEMA), in which 6 inches of topsoil were removed. In a controversial decision, and a departure from previous protocol regarding residential areas affected by wildfires, federal and state agencies did not conduct soil testing on burned parcels of land.

=== Wind damage ===
Hundreds of trees were reported to have fallen due to strong wind gusts during the accompanying windstorm. Roughly ten semi-trucks were blown over on a section of Route 210 close to Fontana. Multiple flights at Hollywood Burbank Airport were delayed or canceled due to strong winds.

=== School and other closures ===
At least 19 Los Angeles school districts announced school closures. Pepperdine University closed its Calabasas and Malibu campuses. All schools in the Los Angeles Unified School District were closed on January 9 as a result of fire conditions and the destruction of two elementary schools. Later in the day on January 9, District Superintendent Alberto M. Carvalho informed the media that schools would be closed January 10 and "would not resume until conditions improve". Las Virgenes Unified School District schools were closed January 8–10 due to dangerous conditions and some of their schools being in voluntary or mandatory evacuation zones. UCLA announced that all classes would be online through January 17.

On January 7, NASA closed the Jet Propulsion Laboratory in nearby La Cañada Flintridge, California, through at least January 13 due to high winds and the encroaching Eaton Fire, forcing the evacuation of all non-emergency personnel at the site. The operations of the NASA Deep Space Network were relocated from the main facility to an off-site location and all employees were instructed to work from home. As of January 10, JPL director Laurie Leshin reported there has been minor wind damage and no wildfire damage at the site, but over 150 staff had lost their homes.

Following the Eaton Fire, the entire Angeles National Forest, which accounts for 27 percent of the area of Los Angeles County, was closed from January 14 to 15, and later extended to the 19th, citing public safety and "critical fire danger".

=== Entertainment and sports industries ===
Due to severe winds and fire danger, Amazon MGM Studios, TriStar Pictures, and Universal Pictures canceled the Hollywood premieres of Unstoppable, One of Them Days, and Wolf Man. Universal Studios closed its Universal Studios Hollywood theme park and Universal CityWalk. The 31st Annual Screen Actors Guild Awards canceled a live announcement of its nominees, instead issuing the list in a press release. The 30th Annual Critics' Choice Awards, intended to be held on January 12 in Santa Monica, were postponed twice due to the fires. The ceremony was presented on February 7. The deadline for Oscar nominations voting was extended to January 17 due to the fire. The nominations announcement, originally scheduled to be announced on January 17, was delayed to January 23. The premiere of the Under Ninja movie was cancelled due to the state of emergency, as was that of The Last Showgirl. Several Hollywood entertainment headquarters and production centers were shut down, postponing production of several shows and movies such as Grey's Anatomy, NCIS, NCIS: Origins, Hacks, Ted Lasso, Fallout, On Call, Doctor Odyssey, With Love, Meghan, Abbott Elementary, The Pitt, Jimmy Kimmel Live!, After Midnight, and The Price Is Right. The Filipino-organized 2025 Manila International Film Festival was postponed.

The National Hockey League postponed a January 8 game at the Crypto.com Arena in downtown Los Angeles between the Los Angeles Kings and Calgary Flames due to the wildfires. The National Basketball Association postponed a January 9 game between the Los Angeles Lakers and the Charlotte Hornets also at Crypto.com Arena as well as two January 11 games between the Lakers and San Antonio Spurs at Crypto.com Arena and between the Los Angeles Clippers and Hornets at Intuit Dome. The National Football League moved the January 13 playoff game between the Los Angeles Rams and the Minnesota Vikings from SoFi Stadium to State Farm Stadium in Glendale, Arizona. The United States women's national soccer team moved their training camp from Dignity Health Sports Park to Florida Blue Training Center in Fort Lauderdale, Florida. Santa Anita Park postponed races originally scheduled for January 10 to January 16 due to poor air quality caused by the wildfires. The track management also announced that it would offer to pay for relocating horses if the owners wish to move them due to the situation. The PGA Tour relocated the Genesis Invitational from Riviera Country Club, which was not damaged in the Palisades Fire despite its proximity, to Torrey Pines Golf Course, retaining the dates of February 13–16.

The Weeknd postponed the release of his sixth album, Hurry Up Tomorrow, which has as its lead single the song "Dancing in the Flames", and canceled an accompanying concert at the Rose Bowl out of "respect and concern" for the residents of Los Angeles County. Beyoncé postponed a major announcement that was set for January 14, 2025, and donated $2.5 million to wildfire relief efforts through her non-profit organization, BeyGood. Nine Inch Nails postponed official announcements regarding their Peel it Back Tour for 2025 out of respect for the situation. Alessia Cara substituted the release of the single "Fire" from her upcoming album, Love & Hyperbole, originally due for release on January 17, 2025, with a different song due to the wildfires.

=== Transportation ===
Los Angeles County Supervisor and Los Angeles Metro Board Chair Janice Hahn authorized the suspension of fare collection on January 8 because of intermittent power outages that made it difficult for users to buy and load fare cards. The suspension was later extended further "while the wildfire crisis continues". Some Los Angeles Metro Bus lines were suspended while some were detoured as a result of the wind and wildfire damage to the city. The Los Angeles International Airport remained operational throughout the wildfires. Though several airlines have waived change fees for flights to LA and Orange County. Some flights to Burbank were also diverted. As of 10:45 a.m. PST on January 8, FlightAware indicated that around 18% of flights in Burbank were canceled and 11% were delayed.

=== Water supply ===
Although the three water tanks in the Pacific Palisades area had been filled to their capacity of about 1 million US gallons (3,800 m^{3}) each, those supplies were exhausted by the early morning of January 8. Dozens of hydrants in the Pacific Palisades were reported by firefighting personnel to have little to no water flow during initial efforts to control the Palisades Fire. The chief executive officer of the LADWP, Janisse Quiñones, reported that all fire hydrants in the area "went dry" by around 3 a.m. PST on January 8. The emptying of water tanks worsened the lack of pressure in the city's trunk lines to transport water to higher areas, with firefighters being unable to reach pump stations to aid transport due to the fire spreading out of control. Additionally, the Santa Ynez Reservoir, which has a capacity of 117 million US gallons (440,000 m^{3}), had been emptied for repairs in February 2024; had it been available, the water pressure may have lasted for longer.

The department stated that high winds made it impossible to fight the fire from the air, putting inordinate pressure on the fire hydrant system. Quiñones reported that the response to the fires caused "tremendous demand on our [water] system", with "the public water system faced four times its usual demand". Supplies for firefighting were "being emptied three times in less than 24 hours". The Fire Department was forced to add 75 cubic feet (2,100 L) per second on its water lines in order to maintain enough water pressure. Firefighters resorted to delegating construction personnel to transport water tanks to areas requiring them. LA County Public Works director Mark Pestrella requested that evacuating residents turn off their water and gas lines so more water could go to firefighting efforts. It was reported that firefighters had begun using pools for water.

The Pasadena Water and Power department released a "Water Alert" on January 8 due to debris and elevated turbidity in the water supply to not drink the water untreated in the area and to not drink tap water. The LADWP issued boil-water notices in multiple areas of the Pacific Palisades on the same day, including for the 90272 and 90402 ZIP Code areas and their adjacent areas. They said that benzene and other volatile organic compounds have the potential to enter the local water system. A County Public Works director, Mark Pestrella, reported "significant damage" to Los Angeles county's sewer systems in addition to its power and transportation systems, each due to massive amounts of debris and thousands of felled trees caused by the fires and corresponding windstorm.

Various sources, such as Fox News, Turning Point USA, and RT, falsely attributed the water shortage to the removal of 4 hydroelectric dams along the Klamath River in 2023/24. Fox News host Jesse Watters linked the crises to the removal of the dams, while RT said their dismantling "is now being blamed for the shortage of water available to fight LA fires". President-elect Donald Trump posted on social media that Governor Newsom had "refused to sign the water restoration declaration" that would have brought water from the North to the South of California. However, Southern California has never received water from those dams, which are over 500 miles north of Los Angeles County, with claims that the removal of the dams affected the South's supply being incorrect as the Metropolitan Water District of Southern California does not take water from the Klamath River area.

=== Looting ===
There have been several reports of individuals looting evacuated houses amidst the chaos. As of January 13, at least 29 people had been arrested for looting. Two people were caught posing as firefighters in order to steal from evacuees. Twenty five people were arrested in the area surrounding the Eaton Fire evacuation zone; another four were arrested in the Palisades region. Officials condemned the looting including Los Angeles County Supervisor Kathryn Barger, who elaborated that the looters were "targeting vulnerable communities". National Guard troops were deployed to some burn areas to provide protection against looting. On January 18, a man and woman were arrested for trespassing in the Palisades Fire zone in a fire engine purchased at auction in Oregon and for posing as firefighters. The male suspect reportedly has prior arrests for arson and criminal mischief. Several people have also been accused of arson.

== Response ==
Los Angeles County Fire Department urgently called for firefighters from Ventura, Orange, San Luis Obispo, and Santa Barbara counties to aid in firefighting efforts. Chief Anthony Marrone said the county's 29 fire departments lacked enough personnel to combat the wildfires. Intensifying wind gusts at 7 p.m. PST on January 7 resulted in the mass grounding of firefighting aircraft. Sudden changes in wind direction put different areas at risk and complicated firefighting. Some wealthy citizens, including high-net-worth individuals and celebrities, were able to hire private-sector firefighters to prevent damage to their property. At midday on January 8, California Governor Gavin Newsom deployed the California National Guard. On January 8, Cal OES reported that more than 7,500 emergency personnel were deployed to fight the fires.

On January 7, the California Department of Corrections and Rehabilitation (CDCR) deployed 783 incarcerated firefighters to assist in fighting the blazes. Later, on January 11, the figure had risen to 939 incarcerated firefighters. These individuals were trained through the California Conservation Camp Program and worked alongside professional firefighters. On January 10, The Pentagon, the headquarters of the US Department of Defense, deployed 500 marines from the Travis Air Force Base to assist with firefighting efforts in Los Angeles. While the fires were still burning, incoming President Trump redirected these units to the Southern Border to assist with deportation flights.

Evacuation shelters for animals were also designated: the Rose Bowl in Pasadena for large animals, and the Pasadena Humane Society for small ones.

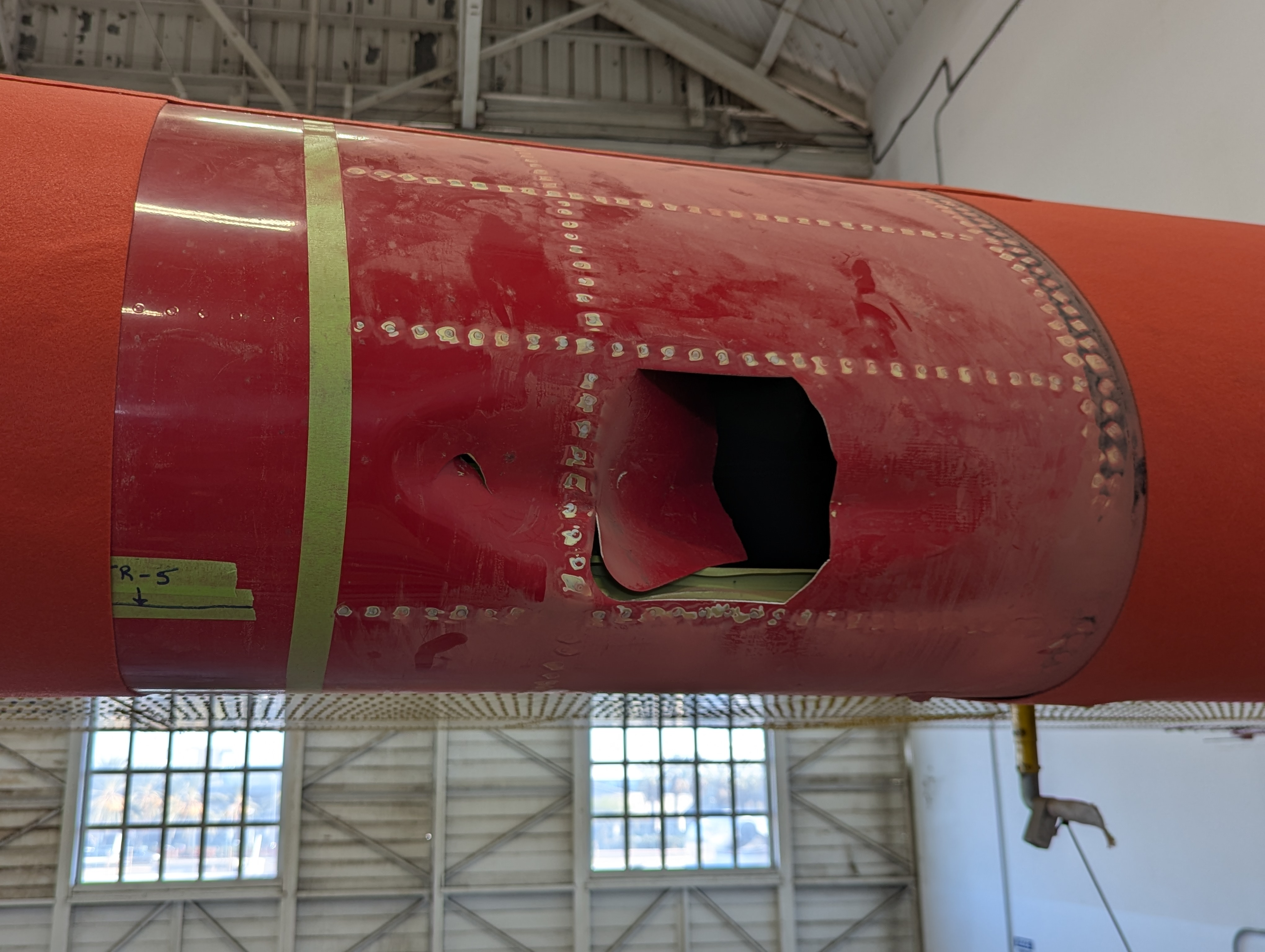
Damage to the aircraft as a result of the collision

A DJI Mini 3 drone illegally operating in restricted airspace collided with a Canadair CL-415 "Super Scooper" firefighting aircraft working to contain the Palisades Fire, damaging the aircraft and forcing it to land on January 9. LA County Fire Chief Anthony Marrone stated that the drone "put a hole in the wing" of the aircraft and put it out of commission. The collision was reported to the Federal Aviation Administration (FAA) by fire officials, resulting in the FAA pursuing an investigation and considering "swift enforcement action" against the drone operator(s). The United States Forest Service Chief Randy Moore reported that multiple private drones flying in unauthorized airspace were interfering with firefighting efforts and causing danger to the firefighting crew. The Federal Bureau of Investigation (FBI) initiated a search for the responsible drone operator, and requested that the public provide possible leads, eventually arresting the operator of the drone, Peter Tripp Akemann, 56 of Culver City, California, which he pled guilty to.

After several looting arrests, the Los Angeles County Sheriff's Department began work on implementing a 6 p.m. to 6 a.m. curfew, intended to begin the night of January 9. The punishment for looting during the event can be a $1,000 fine and even potential jail time. The curfew was then put in effect from 6 p.m. to 6 a.m. in the Pacific Palisades and Eaton fire areas. Los Angeles County Sheriff Robert Luna said that the curfew has been established to prevent looting in the mandatory evacuated areas, stating that "we do not want anyone taking advantage of our residents that have already been victimized". In total, more than 54 people were arrested in the areas affected by the Palisades and Eaton fires, with some being charged with arson.

Los Angeles County released a website containing a searchable database of addresses within the perimeters of the Palisades and Eaton Fires with information on whether they are destroyed or damaged. An executive order was signed by the Mayor of Los Angeles Karen Bass to rebuild the city affected by the wildfires; this includes the availability of 1,200 homes for displaced individuals.

On January 23, US response agency FEMA has announced that more than $35 million has been distributed by them to people in LA. As of March 2025, FEMA and its federal partners had made more than $2 billion available to disaster survivors (primarily in home and business loans offers from the Small Business Administration), including more than $100 million in FEMA housing and other needs assistance.

=== Out-of-state assistance ===
On January 8, US President Joe Biden ordered the Department of Defense to provide firefighting personnel and equipment. US Navy helicopters were sent from San Diego, and the Nevada National Guard and United States Forest Service sent fire engines. In a press conference that same afternoon, LA County Fire Department chief Marrone said firefighters were arriving from other states: 60 teams from Oregon, 45 from Washington State, 15 from Utah, 10 from New Mexico, and an unspecified amount from Arizona. Montana also sent 10 fire engines and 40 firefighters from different counties, including: Columbus, Red Lodge, Missoula, Big Sky, Central Valley, Big Fork, Corvallis, Whitefish, Plains, Paradise, and Butte. Texas governor Greg Abbott also sent several firefighters and emergency personnel to combat the wildfires, including the Dallas Fire-Rescue Department and from Southeast Texas. The Red Cross from Texas Region also sent four volunteers: three from Austin and one from San Antonio.

On January 14, 2025, the Federal Emergency Management Agency opened two disaster recovery centers to help wildfire victims apply for financial assistance: one in West Los Angeles at the UCLA Research Park (the former Westside Pavilion) and the other in Pasadena at the Community Education Center of Pasadena City College.

According to CNN, representatives for Department of Government Efficiency in late January 2025 instructed the United States Bureau of Reclamation to release water through the Jones Pumping Plant despite the water being unable to reach fire-affected Los Angeles, but the Jones Pumping Plant had been temporarily shut down for maintenance, and one DOGE representative was not granted water pump access as he was not employed by the government.

From January 31 to February 2, the United States Army Corps of Engineers, under the Trump administration which had taken office a few days before, released 2.2 billion gallons of water (per local authorities) from federal reservoirs in California's Lake Success and Lake Kaweah via the Schafer Dam and Terminus Dam respectively. Trump commented on social media on January 31 on "beautiful water flow that I just opened in California … Everybody should be happy about this long fought Victory! I only wish they listened to me six years ago — There would have been no fire!" Within a week of the water release, the Army Corps of Engineers commented that the released water "could not be delivered to Southern California directly", that the California Department of Water Resources and the United States Bureau of Reclamation said they "likely could not utilize the additional water with such short notice", and that the Army Corps of Engineers stopped the water release after "elected officials expressed concerns from their constituents about potential flooding of downstream lands".

=== International assistance ===
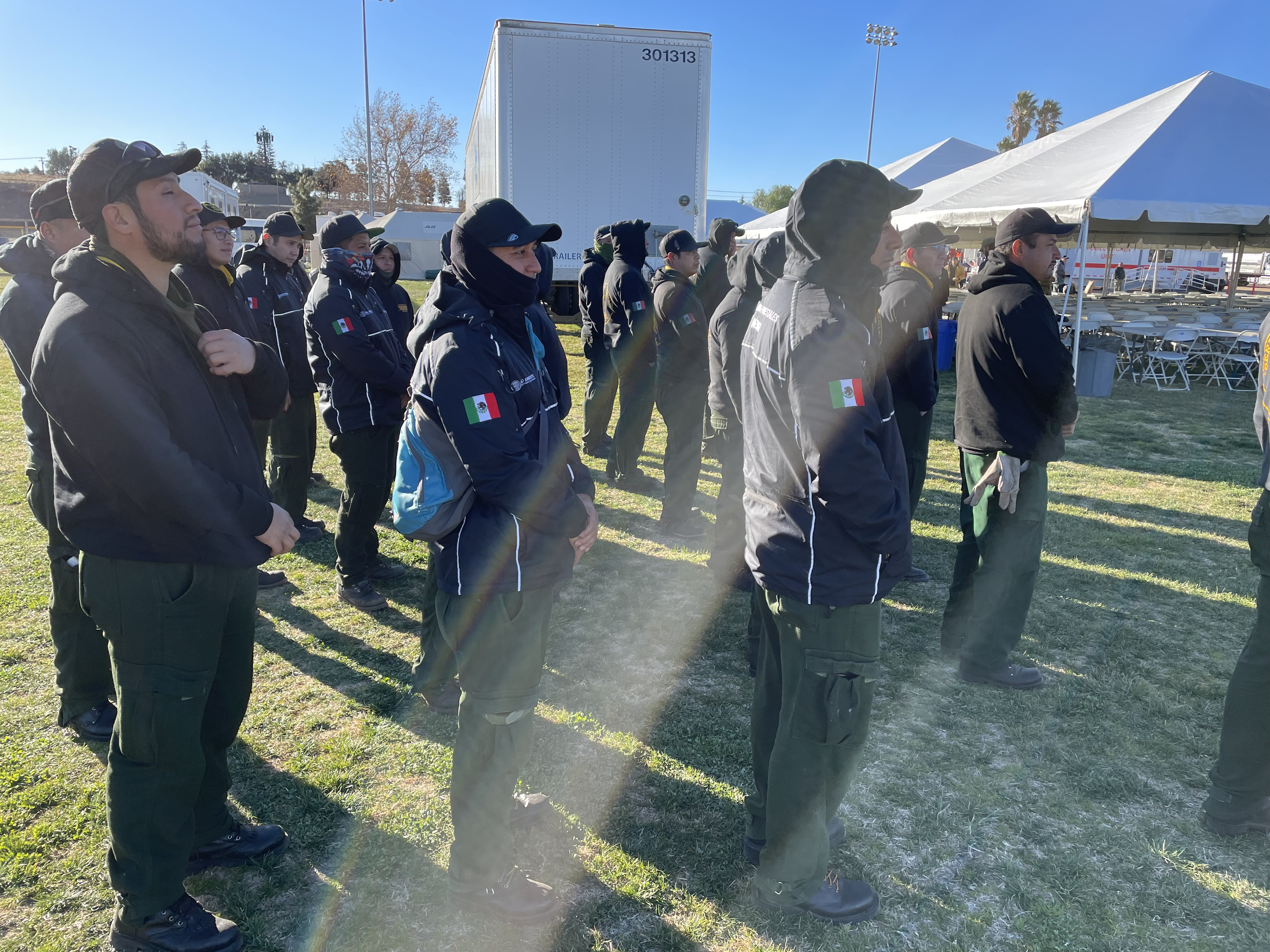
Firefighters from Mexico awaiting their assignments at Noble Creek Mobilization Center, January 13, 2025

On January 8, the Canadian government was already preparing for a possible aid response. The following day, Emergency Preparedness Minister Harjit Sajjan offered to "deploy 250 firefighters, aircraft equipment, and other resources as early as tonight" as part of a coordinated effort with Alberta, Ontario, and Quebec. On January 9, NIFC requested two Canadair CL-415 water bomber aircraft through CIFFC, their Canadian counterpart, which worked with provincial agencies to fulfill the request. Multiple provincial governments pledged their support as well; the British Columbian and Albertan governments offered water bombers, night-vision helicopters, and incident command teams. Two CL-415 water bombers from Quebec were already in California as per a long-term contract with the LA County Fire Department; they have been involved since January 7. On January 10, it was announced that two additional CL-415s would be sent. The Canadian government announced on January 12 that 60 firefighters would be deployed to join the firefighting efforts; the province of Ontario promised two water bombers, 165 urban firefighters, and an incident management team.

Mexican firefighters arrived at Los Angeles International Airport on January 12, 2025, to help battle the fires. They included firefighters from the National Forestry Commission and the National Secretary of Defense. The Iranian Red Crescent offered to dispatch rapid deployment units to combat wildfires. Ukrainian President Volodymyr Zelenskyy has offered to deploy State Emergency Service firefighters to California to help deal with the fires.

On January 15, 2025, the Japanese government pledged to provide $2 million through the Red Cross to "establish evacuation sites and offer food and psychological support to those affected by the fires".

== Reactions ==
=== Domestic ===
Los Angeles councilwoman Traci Park stated that the wildfires were "a devastating loss, for all of Los Angeles". Governor of California Gavin Newsom urged residents to follow evacuation orders and stated to the incoming Trump administration that "I'm not here to play any politics" after he contacted President Joe Biden to receive federal fire assistance with "No politics, no handwringing, no kissing of the feet." He later canceled his trip to Washington, D.C., where he had planned to attend President Jimmy Carter's memorial service. President Joe Biden also canceled his trip to Italy in order to focus on tracking the wildfires across the Los Angeles area. He also offered any federal assistance needed to suppress the Palisades Fire. In addition, Vice President Kamala Harris urged people to heed the guidance of local officials and also canceled her own trip to Singapore, Bahrain, and Germany.

President-elect Donald Trump placed blame on Governor Gavin Newsom for refusing to sign a "water restoration declaration", citing a desire for the governor to protect "an essentially worthless fish called the smelt." Newsom's press office responded, stating that such a declaration does not exist and is "pure fiction". On January 10, 2025, Newsom told Joe Biden that the country needed to address "hurricane-force winds of mis- and disinformation" about the fires. On January 11, Newsom launched the CaliforniaFireFacts.com webpage on his website, intended to correct misinformation and disinformation regarding California's policies and management before and during the wildfires. He accused "so-called leaders and partisan media outlets" of spreading misinformation, whom he stated was dividing the country "for their own political gain" and causing distress to the fire's victims. On January 12, while being interviewed on the Pod Save America podcast, Newsom stated that he was ordering an inquiry to determine why several fire hydrants ran out of water during the firefighting response, elaborating that he kept "getting different answers" from Los Angeles officials. Newsom also criticized Elon Musk for politicization and disinformation on wildfires.

On January 15, 2025, US Senator Ron Johnson (R-WI) argued for the imposition of conditions on the release of federal aid to California wildfire victims. He criticized the moral hazard inherent in California's "laws where they made it very unattractive for private insurers to come in and actually insure their properties and assess the risk properly" and thereby "encouraged people to build multimillion ... homes and complexes in very vulnerable areas". He further argued that such increased exposure to wildfire risk was then compounded by incompetent mitigation of that risk. Kelsey Piper, a journalist writing for Vox, criticized Newsom and Insurance Commissioner Ricardo Lara's impulse to respond "to a problem that was substantially caused by price controls with more price controls" by banning policy nonrenewals and fire sales of homes at less than pre-fire values.

Los Angeles Mayor Karen Bass' absence during President Biden's visit to Santa Monica to assess fire damage drew criticism, including from former Obama administration spokesperson Tommy Vietor. At the time the fires broke out, Bass was in Ghana as part of a delegation attending the inauguration of President John Mahama. She later ended her trip early, returning to the city on January 8. A New York Times article characterized Bass's international visit occurring when the NWS had warned of "extreme fire weather conditions" as having "set off a political crisis". The article reported that during her 2021 mayoral campaign, Bass explicitly stated to The New York Times that she would restrict her travel as mayor to domestic locations after she expressed initial reluctance about leaving her international work, particularly her involvement in United States–Africa relations. Despite this campaign pledge, the article stated that Bass undertook several international trips after assuming office in December 2022, including multiple visits to France regarding the 2024 Summer Olympic Games and a diplomatic visit to Mexico for President Claudia Sheinbaum's inauguration. The article reported that Bass claimed that the visit was conducted at the Biden administration's request, that she maintained "constant contact" with officials as the wildfires grew, and that she took a military plane back to Los Angeles as the quickest possible trip. Bass's spokesperson Zach Seidl stated that her 2021 pledge about only conducting domestic travel as a mayor was "a miscommunication".

Los Angeles Times owner Patrick Soon-Shiong criticized Bass for cutting $17.6 million from the annual budget to the fire department, noting that severe fire hazard conditions had been known well in advance and that fire hydrants in Pacific Palisades lacked pressure. Politico stated that Soon-Shiong's assertions were wrong, and that the city was in the process of drafting a new contract with the fire department as the budget was being crafted, and that additional funding was set aside in a separate fund until the deal was finalized in December. It also stated that Bass "did not push back on the record to inquiries about Soon-Shiong's post, allowing the incorrect information to circulate widely online for most of Wednesday". Bob Blumenfield, a member of the Los Angeles City Council, said that the fire department's budget had increased by more than $50 million. The city's financial analysts stated that the fire department's operating budget increased more than 7% compared to the prior fiscal year. When reporters asked Mayor Bass about the budget cuts on January 9, she said that "There were no reductions that were made that would have impacted the situation".

Several drone operators were targeted with harsh criticism for flying in unauthorized airspace to take pictures and videos of the wildfires and neighborhoods damaged by the fires. Critics included other drone operators and photographers, with many posting comments under drone pictures chastising the operator for causing danger to and hindering firefighting efforts. Several people who used drones to take pictures or videos during the outbreak subsequently deleted their social media accounts.

The Los Angeles Rams wore hats and shirts inscribed with "LAFD" in solidarity with the fire department and wildfire victims during the NFL Wild Card playoff game (their home game but played in another venue) against the Minnesota Vikings in Glendale, Arizona, on January 13. Former Rams tackle and Super Bowl winner Andrew Whitworth spoke to the State Farm Stadium crowd at the beginning of the contest talking about the impact of the wildfires, the bravery of first responders and firefighters, and the resiliency of LA's residents in uniting and rebuilding. After a 27–9 upset victory, Rams head coach Sean McVay described the team as having "epitomized and represented the city the right way" amid its struggle and resilience during the fires. Rams quarterback Matthew Stafford said:

But we knew we weren't playing just for us. [We were] playing for people back home that needed something to, you know, watch and enjoy. And I'm glad we could give that to them.

— Matthew Stafford, Los Angeles Rams quarterback

The Los Angeles Kings, during their five-game road trip, wore patches and stickers honoring the LAFD as well as their opponents they played against: Winnipeg Jets, Calgary Flames, Edmonton Oilers, Vancouver Canucks, and Seattle Kraken. A special moment was held in Winnipeg dedicated to the firefighters. During their first home game on January 21 against the Pittsburgh Penguins since the fires, the Kings repainted center ice with the logo of the LAFD and honored both firefighters and first responders. The Los Angeles Lakers during their home game against the San Antonio Spurs held a moment of silence and dedicated the game to the firefighters. Despite the fact Victor Wembanyama and Chris Paul were playing for the Spurs, the two gave the children of Lakers coach JJ Redick their game jerseys, as the two boys lost their basketball collection in the Palisades Fire. The Los Angeles Clippers gave away rally towels during their home game against the Miami Heat featuring the words "LA Strong" and a blue image of the state of California. The Anaheim Ducks honored Orange County firefighters who battle the Palisades and Eaton fire at their home game on January 21 against the Florida Panthers.

All twelve teams in the Los Angeles area donated more than $8 million to the American Red Cross, Los Angeles Fire Department Foundation, California Fire Foundation, Eaton Canyon Fire Relief and Recovery Fund, World Central Kitchen, California Community Foundation Wildfire Recovery Fund, Team Rubicon, and various local animal rescue organizations. Several celebrities including Taylor Swift, Leonardo DiCaprio, Eva Longoria, Beyoncé, Paris Hilton, Jamie Lee Curtis, Selena Gomez, Kylie Jenner, and Halle Berry donated money to various organizations in order to help the victims affected by the wildfires. Meghan Markle and Prince Harry also aided the victims by volunteering their time alongside workers from the World Central Kitchen by distributing meals to those in need at a meal distribution center.

On January 28, governor Gavin Newsom launched "LA Rises", a fundraising initiative in collaboration with the private sector to help rebuild areas affected by the fires in addition to $2.5 billion in state relief. The Los Angeles Dodgers made a $100 million donation to LA Rises.

On January 30, 2025, the benefit concert FireAid was held, and other similar concerts followed. Compilation benefit albums, such as Los Angeles Rising and Super Bloom: A Benefit for Los Angeles Fire Relief, were also released.

During Los Angeles FC's home opener against Minnesota United FC on February 22, 2025, LAFC fans unveiled a tifo honoring the LAFD and other firefighters. A day later, the LA Galaxy honored Los Angeles County firefighters at their home opener against San Diego FC.

During the Los Angeles Dodgers's home opener against the Detroit Tigers on March 27, 2025, firefighters from across the Los Angeles area were brought in for the flag salute ceremony before the game started. The Los Angeles Angels started wearing a firefighter helmet during the 2025 season whenever they hit home runs.

The Rams held their 2025 NFL draft at the LAFD's Air Operations facility in Van Nuys to honor the firefighters who fought in the fires.

In January, along with other celebrities, Taylor Swift donated to Santa Barbara-based relief organization, Direct Relief, to help California communities rebuild after the devastating wildfires that overran parts of L.A.

=== International ===
Prime Minister of Australia Anthony Albanese said the footage from Los Angeles would be shocking for Australians facing wildfires and showed the impact of climate change on fire seasons. The government also offered help to the United States to fight the wildfires. Chilean President Gabriel Boric called on his people to prevent fires in the country.

=== Criticism of the Los Angeles Fire Department ===
The Los Angeles Fire Department's response to the Palisades Fire has been heavily criticized. The LAFD's decision not to pre-deploy any engines or firefighter teams to Pacific Palisades in the days leading up to the Palisades Fire despite heavy winds and red-flag fire weather conditions has been criticized. This failure to station any firefighter teams in Pacific Palisades led to delays in firefighters getting to the area after the fire had started. The LAFD was also criticized for not fully extinguishing the Lachman Fire, which was started by a person on January 1 in the Pacific Palisades area. Firefighter teams initially believed they had fully extinguished the fire. However, they reported to their battalion commander that the ground was still smoldering and rocks were hot to the touch, suggesting persistent underground fires. The battalion commander, falsely believing the fire was extinguished, ordered the teams to leave the area despite their concerns. The day before the Palisades Fire, the LAFD was criticized for pre-deploying only 5 of an available 40 fire engines throughout the Los Angeles area. The LAFD also did not extend shifts, or add second shifts, to nearly 1,000 firefighters on duty, allowing them to go home and reducing the available firefighters by half during the red flag fire weather and wind conditions. The lack of adequate pre-deployment throughout the city was a was a violation of the departments previous policies.

An October 2025 report detailing the LAFD's response to the Palisades Fire has been criticized for minimizing and obfuscating the LAFD's failures. A Los Angeles Times investigation found six previous drafts of the report which were edited prior to the seventh and final draft being released to the public. The edits removed criticisms of the LAFD's failure to pre-deploy any firefighter teams to the Pacific Palisades area before the fires. Passages criticizing the LAFD's failure to pre-deploy all available fire teams throughout the city of Los Angeles were also removed. Sections stating that LAFD teams and leadership violated national guidelines regarding firefighters' safety and avoiding firefighter deaths were removed. The January 1st Lachman Fire, which the LAFD falsely believed was fully extinguished only to rekindle 6 days later as the Palisades Fire, was only briefly mentioned in the report without any mention of the LAFD's failures. In February 2026, The Los Angeles Times reported that Los Angeles mayor Karen Bass directed the watering down of the report in an attempt to absolve the city of Los Angeles and the LAFD of liability. The Times reported, citing two anonymous sources, that Bass instructed interim LAFD chief Ronni Villanueva to change the report after she received the first draft, in order to shield the city and the LAFD from legal liability and to protect their image. Mayor Bass denied the accusations and criticized the Times for using third party, unnamed sources. The author of the report, LAFD battalion chief Kenneth Cook, refused to endorse the final version due to the numerous edits and omissions, stating that “the current version appears highly unprofessional and inconsistent with our established standards.”

=== Criticism of the Los Angeles Department of Water and Power ===
Some people took to social media to blame Los Angeles city officials and the Department of Water and Power (DWP) for inadequate water supplies and flow across the city during the fire. Rick Caruso, a real estate developer, former DWP Commissioner and runner-up in the 2022 Los Angeles mayoral election, criticized Mayor Bass and Los Angeles's inadequate firefighting infrastructure, stating, "The firefighters are there [in the neighborhood], and there's nothing they can do." State and local officials denied that state water-distribution choices or supply problems caused the problems, instead saying that demand had surpassed the water system's designed capacity. Around 40 percent of Los Angeles city water comes from state-controlled projects connected to northern California, and the southern California reservoirs have been reported to be at above-average levels.

Altadena residents whose residences were destroyed in the fire criticized a lack of coordination among government organizations in recovery assistance, communication, and reconstruction. Altadena's unincorporated status gives it no city hall or clear centralized command. The DWP responded to critics who noted the empty Santa Ynez Reservoir by debunking misinformation about the fires' spread. Officials said that the reservoir had been taken offline to comply with Los Angeles's drinking-water regulations and that repairs had been slowed by the competitive-bidding requirements in the city's charter. Officials also said fire hydrants were fully operational and in full compliance with LAFD inspections before the disaster, and that its water infrastructure met state and federal fire codes.

=== Litigation ===
More than a dozen residents of Los Angeles County filed a lawsuit in Los Angeles County Superior Court that accused the LADWP of failing to repair the Santa Ynez Reservoir at an appropriate pace and for not preparing its water infrastructure for the predicted windstorm and red-flag alerts; and accused the Los Angeles city government of not properly preparing for the wildfires, and demanded compensation for loss of property, lost wages, and lost business profits. Several residents of Altadena filed four lawsuits against Southern California Edison, alleging that the Eaton Fire was started by faulty power infrastructure owned by the company.

=== Development in high-risk areas ===
Some have criticized continued real estate development in fire-prone regions. A report by Jacobin highlighted how real-estate lobbying efforts have historically opposed restrictions on building in designated high-risk wildfire zones, contributing to the increased destruction caused by fires. The article cited legislative efforts, such as California Senate Bill 55, which aimed to limit development in "very high risk" zones but was ultimately blocked by industry lobbying efforts. Environmental advocates argue that unchecked urban expansion into fire-prone areas has exacerbated wildfire damage and put more residents at risk.

== Gallery of maps ==
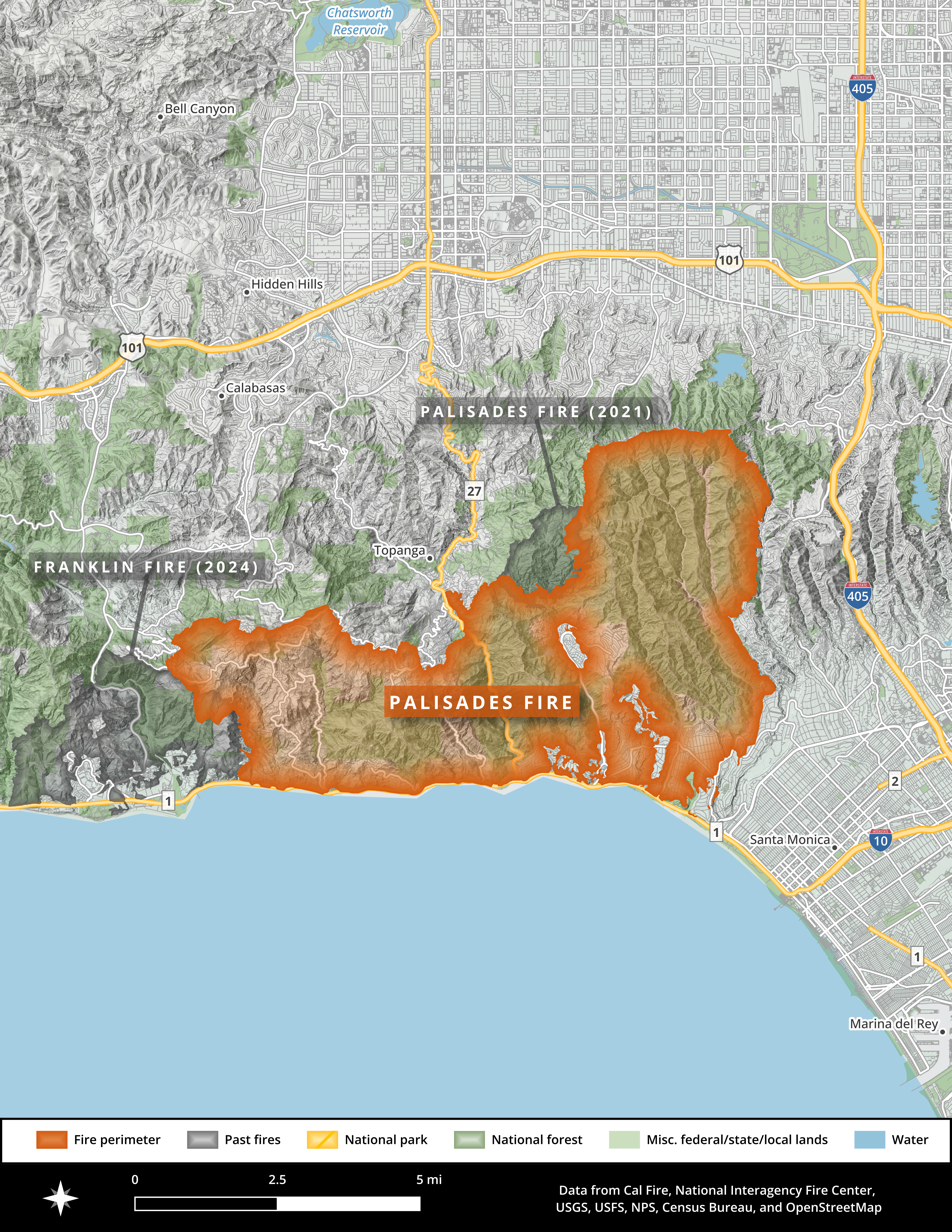
The extent of the Palisades Fire

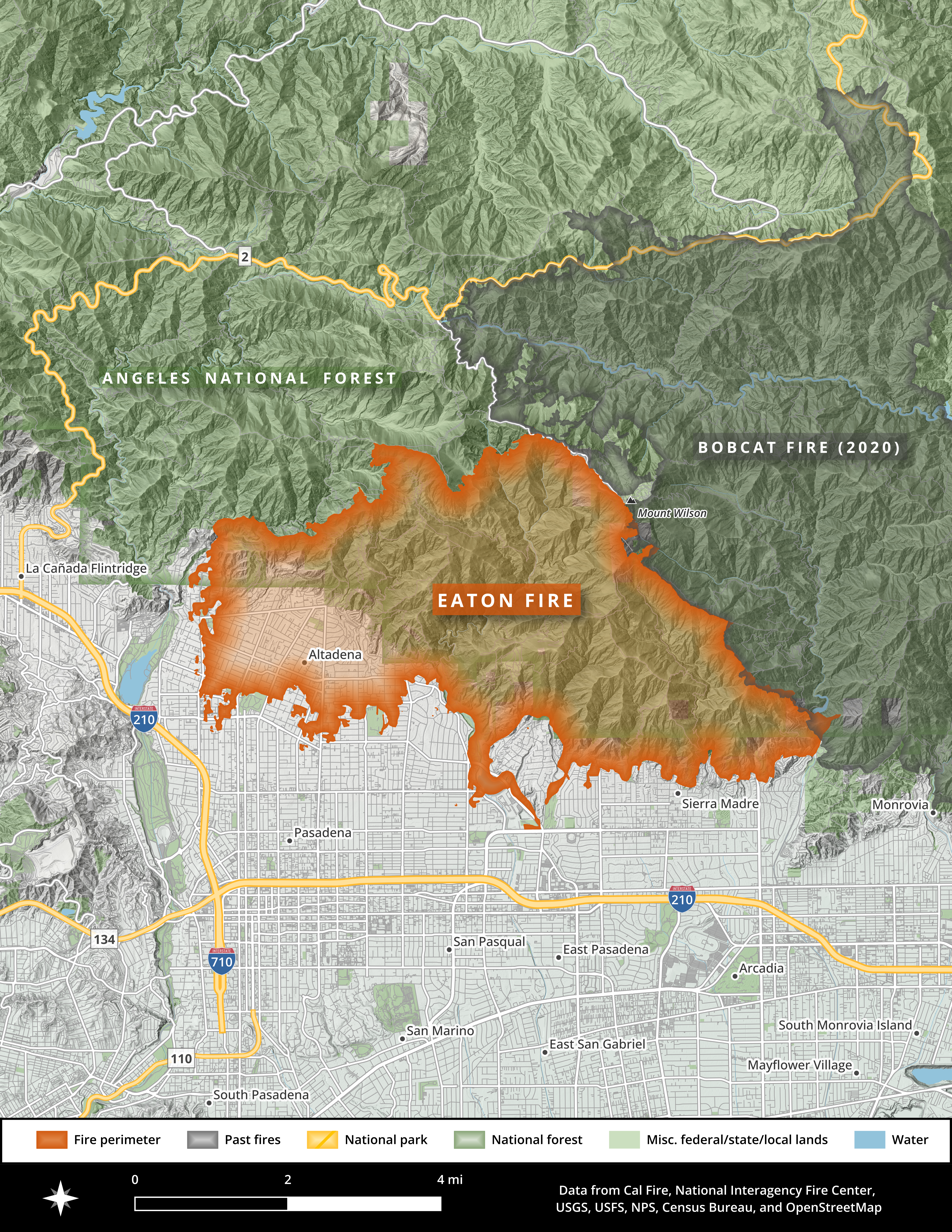
The extent of the Eaton Fire

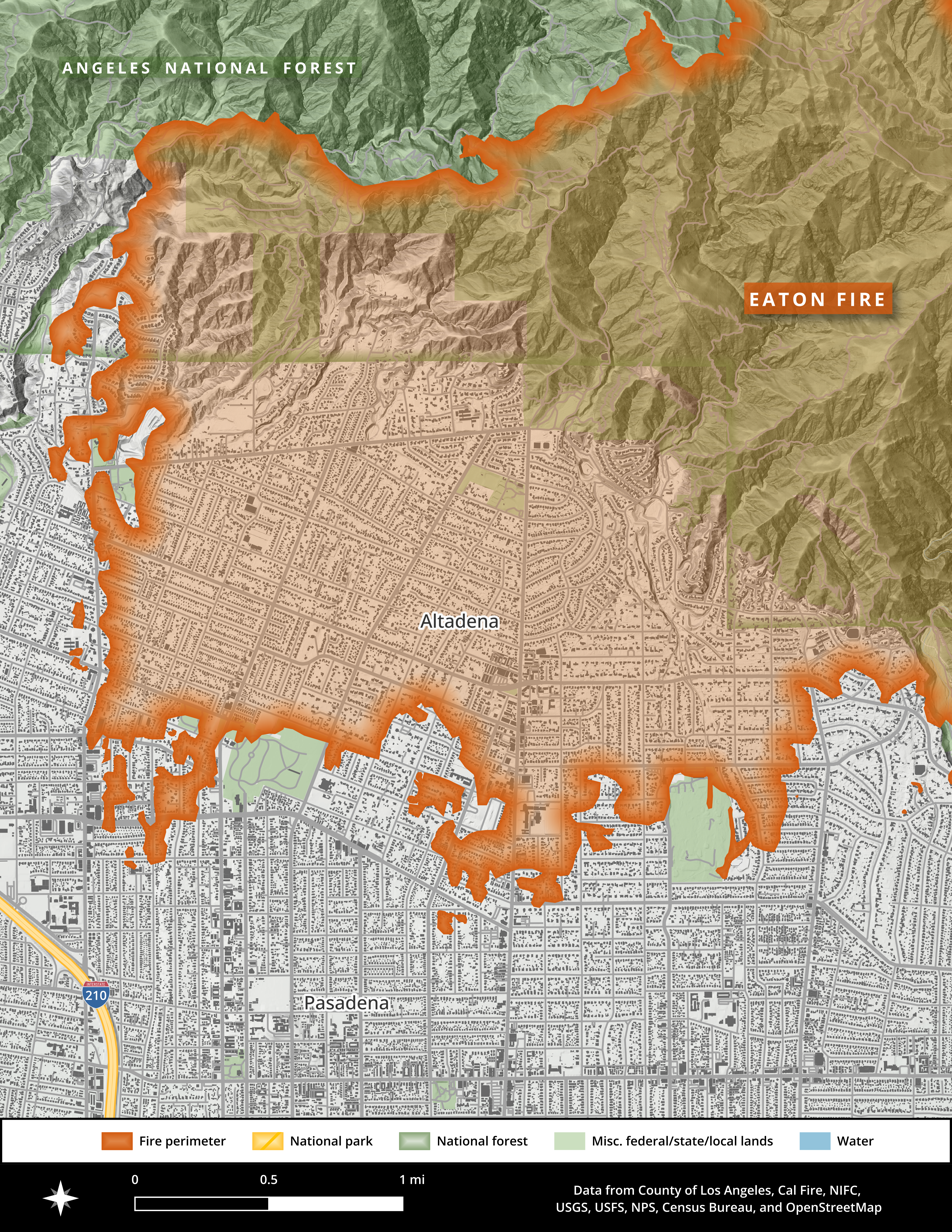
The footprint of the Eaton Fire in the community of Altadena

== See also ==
- 2025 United States wildfires
- 2025 California wildfires
- 2003 California wildfires
- October 2007 California wildfires
- May 2014 San Diego County wildfires
- December 2017 Southern California wildfires
- Marshall Fire – Colorado wildfires from strong winds in 2021
- Watch Duty
