= Superbloom (disambiguation) =

A superbloom is a rare desert botanical phenomenon.

Superbloom may also refer to:

- Superbloom (MisterWives album), 2020
- Superbloom (Ashton Irwin album), 2020
- Superbloom (Silent Planet album), 2023
- Superbloom (Jessie Ware album), 2026
- Superbloom, 2019 album by Ra Ra Riot
- "Superbloom", 2020 song by Ralph
- "Superbloom", 2024 song by Kacey Musgraves
- "Superbloom", 2025 song by Dayglow
- San Diego Super Bloom, professional ultimate team
- Super Bloom: A Benefit for Los Angeles Fire Relief, 2025 charity compilation album
