= Los Angeles Rising =

2025 charity compilation album

Los Angeles Rising: A Compilation Album to Raise Money for Those Affected by the Los Angeles Fires

Compilation album by various artists
- Released: February 6, 2025
- Genre: Alternative rock; Country rock; Electronic; Folk rock
- Length: 62:57
- Producer: Kevin Haskins; Nick Launay

Los Angeles Rising: A Compilation Album to Raise Money for Those Affected by the Los Angeles Fires is a charity compilation album composed of remixes, covers, previously unreleased tracks and collaborations by various artists. It was released on February 6, 2025, as a Bandcamp exclusive, with all of the proceeds from digital sales being donated to the Sweet Relief Musicians Fund, as part of their efforts to provide financial assistance to artists and music professionals affected by the wildfires that had hit Los Angeles in January of the same year.

Musician Kevin Haskins and producer Nick Launay served as executive producers for the compilation album, which they helped put together after being both forced to evacuate their homes due to the wildfires. The compilation album features contributions from Nick Cave and the Bad Seeds, PJ Harvey, Red Hot Chili Peppers members Flea and John Frusciante, Yeah Yeah Yeahs, Danny Elfman, Devo, Gary Numan, Primal Scream and Jarvis Cocker, among others.

== Background and recording ==
From January 7 to 31, 2025, a series of destructive wildfires affected the metropolitan area of Los Angeles, the San Diego County and other areas of the state of California, killing at least 29 people in the process. More than 12,000 structures have been reportedly destroyed in the wildfires, while around 200,000 people were put under evacuation orders, including the likes of John Legend and Chrissy Teigen, Billy Corgan, Rage Against the Machine and Audioslave drummer Brad Wilk, as well as musician Kevin Haskins and producer Nick Launay. Other artists' houses in Los Angeles were burned down in the wildfires, including Madlib, Jhené Aiko, Empress Of, Dawes member Griffin Goldsmith, Fat Tony, Photay and Zachary Cole Smith.

In the aftermath of the wildfires, Haskins and Launay – who both had to evacuate their homes, but ultimately did not lose them or their recording studios – decided to create a compilation album to raise money for those affected and asked various previous collaborators for unreleased recordings that could be made available for the collection. Haskins was best known for being a member of British rock group Bauhaus, and his brother and bandmate David J was among the contributors of the LP; Launay had previously produced for the likes of Nick Cave and the Bad Seeds and Yeah Yeah Yeahs, with both bands also being featured on the charity project. Other artists who had donated tracks for the compilation included PJ Harvey, Red Hot Chili Peppers members Flea and John Frusciante, Danny Elfman, Devo, Gary Numan, Primal Scream and Jarvis Cocker.

All of the 16 tracks included on Los Angeles Rising were previously unreleased, including an alternative take of Yeah Yeah Yeahs' 2006 single "Turn Into" and a cover of the Mamas & the Papas' song "California Dreamin'" by Cocker, originally recorded in 2020. The press release for the project mistakenly noted the song "All We Ever Wanted Was Everything", recorded by Haskins, Garret Vandermolen and Danny Lohner, as being part of the tracklist; however, the track was replaced with "Shadow Fandance", by Natacha Atlas and Samy Bishai, on the album's official Bandcamp page.

== Release and promotion ==
Los Angeles Rising was released on February 6, 2025 as a Bandcamp exclusive, with all of the proceeds from digital sales being donated to the Sweet Relief Musicians Fund, as part of their efforts to provide financial assistance to artists and music professionals affected by the wildfires that had hit Los Angeles in January of the same year. On the same day, Cocker's cover of the Mamas & the Papas' song "California Dreamin'" was released as the lead single from the project. The album was one of several raising money in response to the fires, with others including Super Bloom: A Benefit for Los Angeles Fire Relief and Good Music to Lift Los Angeles.

== Track listing ==
As per Bandcamp data.

No.	Title	Performers/Artists	Length
1.	"The Red River"	PJ Harvey with Danni Bensi and Saunder Jurriaans	3:56
2.	"Worm Tamer" (LaunayVauz remix)	Grinderman	4:16
3.	"Dark Rain"	Gary Numan and Titán	4:34
4.	"Turn Into" (redux)	Yeah Yeah Yeahs	4:36
5.	"Cold Cold Sweat" (LaunayVauz remix)	Band of Skulls	4:12
6.	"California Dreamin'"	Jarvis Cocker	3:01
7.	"False Flags" (orchestral version)	Primal Scream	8:18
8.	"Michelangelo"	Nick Cave and the Bad Seeds	2:46
9.	"Straight to Hell"	Zander Schloss	7:27
10.	"Monkeys on the Loose" (Los Angeles Rising version)	Danny Elfman	2:54
11.	"Shoulda Said Yes"	Devo	3:42
12.	"Deep in LA"	Siobhan Fahey and Titán	4:33
13.	"Blip on the Radar"	CRX	3:18
14.	"No New Tale to Tell"	David J	3:03
15.	"A System for Shutting Everything Out"	Flea, John Frusciante, Kevin Haskins and Doug DeAngelis	2:50
16.	"Shadow Fandance"	Natacha Atlas and Samy Bishai	3:11
17.	"4 American Dollars" (demo version)	U.S. Girls	3:40
18.	"California's Burning"	Zander Schloss	4:42

== Personnel ==
As per Bandcamp data.

=== Musicians ===
- Kim Sion – backing vocals (track 6)

=== Technical ===
- Nick Launay – mastering
- Christian Scott – cover art
- Shepard Fairey – cover art direction
- Don Phüry – Bandcamp layout and publicity assets
- Judy Miller Silverman (Motormouthmedia) – PR services, management and publishing
- Gary Walker (Monotone Inc.) – management and publishing
- Joy Murphy, Marc Cimino (Universal Music Publishing) – management and publishing
- PJ Bloom (Rogue Music Group) – management and publishing
- Jeannette Lee (Rough Trade Management) – management and publishing
- Laura Haber (Little Lion Management) – management and publishing
- Brian Message (ATC Management) – management and publishing
- Suzi Goodrich – management and publishing
- Gerard McElhone – management and publishing
- Gemma Numan – management and publishing
- Naveed Hassan (Black Mountain Management) – management and publishing
- Peter Loraine (Fascination Management) – management and publishing
- Laura Engel (Kraft Engel Management) – management and publishing

== See also ==
- FireAid, 2025 benefit concert for relief effort for the Los Angeles wildfires
