= Janisse Quiñones =

CEO of LUMA Energy

- Born: Caguas, Puerto Rico
- Engineering career
- Institutions: University of Puerto Rico at Mayagüez
- Employer: LUMA Energy

Janisse Quiñones is the CEO of LUMA Energy. She is the former Chief Executive Officer and Chief Engineer of the Los Angeles Department of Water and Power (LADWP) and an executive at Pacific Gas and Electric Company.

== Education ==
Quiñones grew up in Caguas, Puerto Rico. She graduated with a BA in Mechanical Engineering from the University of Puerto Rico at Mayagüez. Earned a Master of Business Administration from University of Phoenix and MAS International Relations, International/Global Studies at UC San Diego School of Global Policy and Strategy.

== Professional career ==
Ms. Quiñones’ experience also includes serving in the United States Coast Guard (USCG), both active duty and in the Coast Guard Reserve since the 2004, including as a Commander and as Deputy, Planning and Incident Management. She retired from the Coast Guard in 2025 after 21 years service between active and reserve service.

Quiñones was appointed to the position of CEO and chief engineer at LADWP in April 2024. Her $750,000 salary was nearly twice as much as her predecessor. In March 2026, she resigned her position to join LUMA Energy as CEO, which is modernizing the electrical grid of Puerto Rico.
