= Bel Air Fire =

1961 wildfire in Southern California

- Date: November 5, 1961 –; November 8, 1961; (4 days)
- Location: Bel Air, Los Angeles, California

Statistics
- Burned area: 6,090 acres (2,465 ha; 10 sq mi; 25 km^{2})
- Land use: Residential, wildlands

Impacts
- Deaths: None reported
- Injuries: 200
- Structures lost: 484 homes

Ignition
- Cause: Unknown

The Bel Air Fire was a disaster that began as a brush fire on November 6, 1961 in the Bel Air community of Los Angeles. The fire was fueled by strong Santa Ana winds. At the time, it was the 5th most destructive fire in the United States and the worst in California since the fires following the 1906 San Francisco Earthquake. The fire's precise cause was never determined, but it was believed to be accidental.

== Fire ==
The season leading up to the fire had been the driest on record up to that point, and the morning of the fire, relative humidity was measured at less than 3% in the Santa Monica Mountains near where the fire began. At 8am on November 5th, the fire began in the mountains directly north of the UCLA campus. It spread south rapidly along the dry chaparral hills in 50 miles per hour (80 km/h) winds. Conditions were so dry that witnesses reported the fire burning silently, without the usual crackle of burning wood caused by water turning to steam. At least 124 LAFD engine companies responded, with aerial support from 16 aircraft.

Multiple celebrities were affected by the fire. Actors Dennis Hopper, Brooke Hayward, Burt Lancaster, Joan Fontaine, and Zsa Zsa Gabor, comedian Joe E. Brown, Nobel laureate chemist Willard Libby, composers Lukas Foss and Conrad Salinger, and writer Aldous Huxley all lost homes in the fire. Others that fought flames before they evacuated were former Vice President Richard Nixon, actor Robert Taylor, film producer Keith Daniels, and orchestra leader Billy Vaughn.

== Aftermath ==
Before the fire could be contained, it destroyed more than 20% of the expensive Bel Air neighborhood, ultimately burning 484 homes, 6,090 acres (24.6 km^{2}) and causing over $25,000,000 in damages. At least 200 firemen were injured with mostly eye injuries due to the smoke and flying embers.

As a result of the Bel Air Fire, Los Angeles initiated a series of laws and fire safety policies. These included the banning of wood shingle roofs in new construction and one of the most stringent brush clearance policies in the US.

The Los Angeles City Fire Department produced a documentary, "Design For Disaster", about the wildfire, narrated by William Conrad. It called the densely packed homes nestled on hillsides covered in dry brush "a serious problem in fire protection, even under the best of conditions."
