= Santa Ynez Reservoir =

- Location within California Location within the Los Angeles metropolitan area
- Location: California, United States
- Coordinates: 34°04′22″N 118°34′08″W
- Type: Reservoir
- Surface area: 9.2 acres (3.7 ha)
- Water volume: Full: 118,000,000 US gal (450,000,000 L; 98,000,000 imp gal)

The Santa Ynez Reservoir is a 117,000,000-US-gallon (440,000 m^{3}) reservoir in Pacific Palisades, Los Angeles, California, U.S. The reservoir covers 9.2 acres (3.7 ha).

== History ==
A permit for construction of the dam was approved in 1965. The Los Angeles Department of Water and Power (LADWP) stated that a reservoir was needed to provide additional water supply for domestic and firefighting purposes on the south slope of the Santa Monica mountains. In 1966, a bid for constructing the concrete-lined, compacted-earth reservoir was given to Aetron, a subsidiary of Aerojet. The reservoir started being filled in 1970.

A 1989 plan to cover the reservoir and others to prevent contamination met local opposition. Area residents believed the cover would attract vandals and be an eyesore. LADWP believed it was needed to keep out animal feces, trash, and chemicals that cause cancer.

A new project to cover the reservoir was initiated in the early 2000s in compliance with water quality and treatment requirements. That project was completed in 2012.

The reservoir gained notoriety in connection with the 2025 Palisades Fire. It was reported that the reservoir was drained due to concerns of contamination in February 2024 after a tear was found in its cover. According to the LADWP, the delay in repair was due to the lengthy time it takes to find a contractor under the Los Angeles city charter's competitive bidding process. On January 10, 2025, California Governor Gavin Newsom requested the Los Angeles Department of Water and Power and Los Angeles Department of Public Works to cooperate with a state investigation of the matter and conduct their own review.

== See also ==
- List of dams and reservoirs in California
