= Super Bloom: A Benefit for Los Angeles Fire Relief =

Compilation album by Various artists
- Released: January 28, 2025
- Length: 243:50

Professional ratings
Review scores
Source	Rating
Uncut	9/10

Super Bloom: A Benefit for Los Angeles Fire Relief is a compilation album by various artists that was released on January 28, 2025, to raise relief money for people affected by the January 2025 California wildfires. The album was organised by the Sweet Relief Musicians Fund. Proceeds from the album's sale went to Sweet Relief, Direct Relief, the Anti-Recidivism Coalition, and Pasadena Humane.

Many of the tracks on the album are demos, live versions, or completely unreleased material. The album was one of several raising money in response to the fires, with others including Los Angeles Rising and Good Music To Lift Los Angeles. Several benefit concerts raising money for people affected by the fires took place around the time of the album's release.

The name of the album is a reference to the superbloom phenomenon; Nicky Devine, who helped to compile the album, said that "Without the burn, the vibrancy wouldn’t be so superb. It acts as a reminder: we will grow from this, and so much more splendidly."

== Track listing ==
No.	Title	Artist	Length
1.	"Tides"	Shannon Lay	3:37
2.	"West Palm Beach"	Bonnie 'Prince' Billy	5:09
3.	"Arms Like Boulders" (Live)	The War on Drugs	5:07
4.	"Our Love"	Adron	4:50
5.	"The Man In My Head"	Robyn Hitchcock	2:57
6.	"Carefree"	Molly Burch	4:19
7.	"Donna"	Jim James	3:32
8.	"Do You Remember Me?" (Altadena Version)	Sofia Bolt	3:01
9.	"Rotion"	Terri Terri	2:50
10.	"You Know It Ain't Right"	Pearl Charles	4:44
11.	"Hand Clappin' Toe Tappin' Finger Snappin' Sing Along Song"	Swamp Dogg	4:39
12.	"Flowers" (demo)	Caroline Rose	2:24
13.	"The Hallway"	Ty Segall	3:18
14.	"Endless Afternoon" (demo)	La Luz	4:26
15.	"On Native Land"	Skiffle Players	4:48
16.	"Way It Is"	Nicole Lawrence & The Durango House Band	7:28
17.	"Congregate"	Rocco DeLuca	4:01
18.	"Reach Out"	Ben Alleman	4:06
19.	"Survival Mode"	Lilliana Villines	3:30
20.	"Otherside"	Particle Kid	3:38
21.	"Big Mother"	Jenny Lewis & Cass McCombs	1:49
22.	"Arthur 09"	Jack Name	1:50
23.	"Randy's Chimes" (live in Geneva)	Chris Cohen	2:46
24.	"Blissed"	Jenny O.	3:35
25.	"I Love You"	Sam Blasucci	2:54
26.	"Down, Down, Down"	Ryan Hedgecock	2:48
27.	"Control" (demo)	Jess Cornelius	3:39
28.	"The Singer Not the Song"	Dean & Britta	2:47
29.	"Chitchen"	Mark Noseworthy	1:36
30.	"Vaping on the Job" (Live @ Tubby's, 9/19/24)	Dougie Poole	5:17
31.	"Philadelphia Lights" (Live At Zebulon)	Eric Slick	5:36
32.	"The Resurrection Game"	Emma Swift	5:15
33.	"Ondes Courtes"	Bitchin Bajas	3:26
34.	"My Impression Now" (acoustic 1997)	Guided By Voices	2:12
35.	"there used to be a stop sign there"	Pigeon Club	3:45
36.	"Glory Strums" (Live at the Ridgefield Playhouse, Ridgefield, CT)	Hiss Golden Messenger	3:32
37.	"Mancala"	Mary Lattimore / Sonny Tragni / Dorien Garry Trio	2:52
38.	"Uninhabitable Earth, Paragraph One" (acoustic version)	Dirty Projectors	4:04
39.	"WCFOA"	James Elkington and Nathan Salsburg	3:10
40.	"Gold Plated Jamie"	White Fence	2:28
41.	"Cradle The Pain" (demo)	Morgan Nagler	2:39
42.	"Like This or Like That" (demo)	Ben Lee	3:56
43.	"My Kind" (demo)	Rosali	2:54
44.	"There Comes A Time"	Aaron MF Olson	3:57
45.	"Regeneration, wildflower, weed, new seed . . . (cell view and Tree View)"	Carlos Niño & Friends ft. Nate Mercereau, Aaron Shaw, Andres Renteria, Tiffany de Leon, and Matthewdavid	6:02
46.	"What The World Needs Now Is Love"	Video Age	3:36
47.	"Exploding Suns" (demo 2)	King Gizzard & the Lizard Wizard	1:27
48.	"sure"	Vicky Farewell	1:44
49.	"All The World or None" (demo)	Joe Henry	5:09
50.	"Isolation" (demo)	Nap Eyes	6:24
51.	"The Truth (Will Do That)"	Charles Moothart	4:59
52.	"Changes, Changing"	BASIC	10:23
53.	"Leave It to Me"	Sergeant Stoltz	5:54
54.	"Springing Leaks" (live)	Algernon Cadwallader	4:27
55.	"More Than Happiness"	Moogstar	3:29
56.	"Good Work Everybody"	Dr. Dog	2:20
57.	"Coq 34"	Shinji Masuko & Emmett Kelly	8:37
58.	"signs" (demo)	Lala Lala	2:20
59.	"Burnt Carmine"	Robert Lester Folsom	5:14
60.	"Bird Hotel" (demo)	Bedouine	4:49
61.	"Corsicana Lightning" (demo with vocals - 2019)	Greta Morgan	2:30
62.	"20240425 v2nm"	Mac DeMarco	2:43
Total length:			243:50

== Personnel ==
- Mastering – William Carroll
- Artwork – Robbie Simon
