= Cholada Thai =

Thai restaurant in Malibu, California

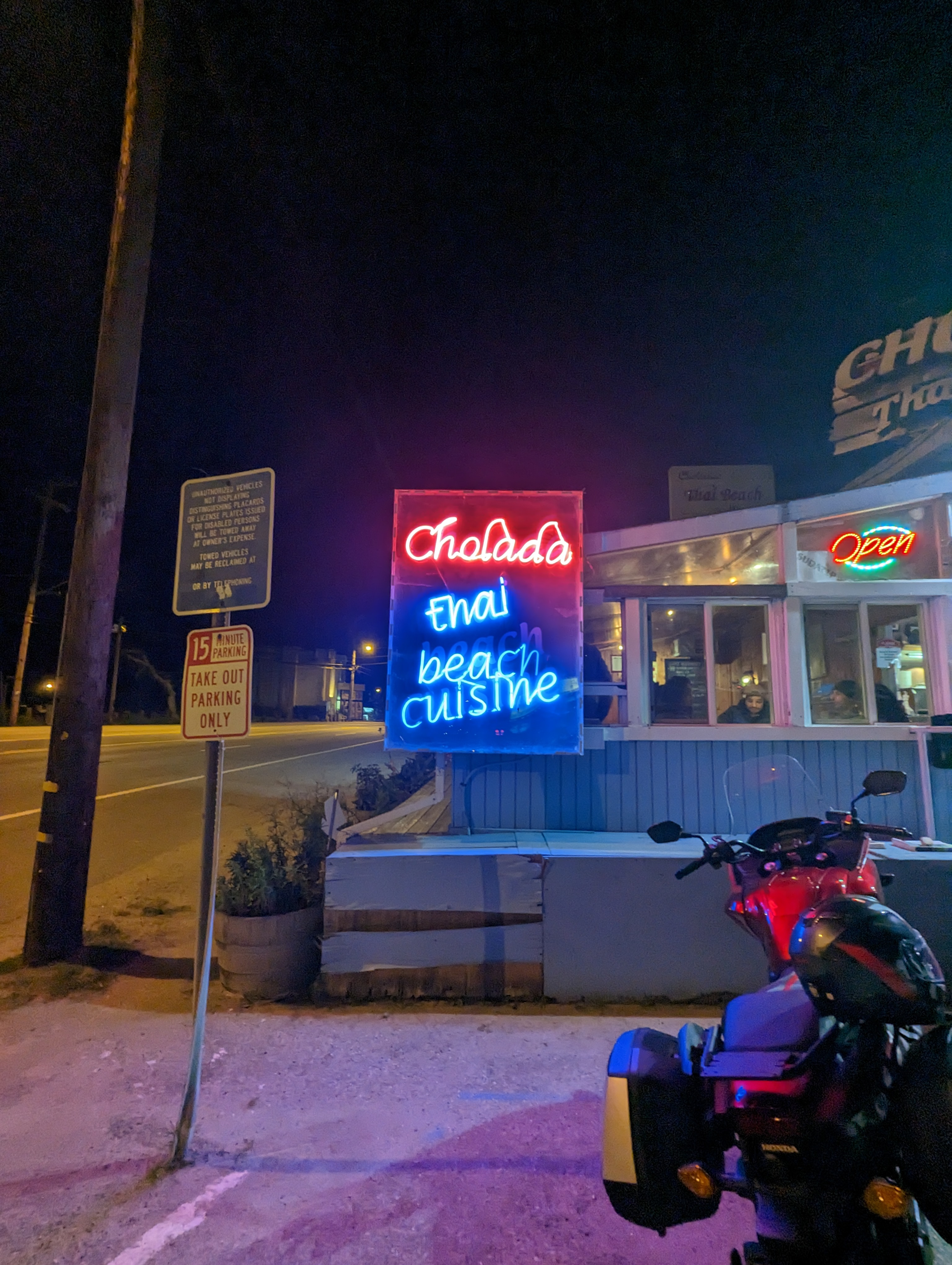
- Exterior photo of the Cholada Thai Restaurant with the restaurant's neon sign and motocycle parked in front.
- Interactive map of Cholada Thai

Restaurant information
- Established: 2000
- Closed: 2025
- Owners: Sawai Theprian and Nikorn "Nick" Sriwichailumpan
- Food type: Thai cuisine
- Dress code: Casual
- Location: 18763 Pacific Coast Hwy, Malibu, California (mailing address), Los Angeles, California, 90265, United States
- Coordinates: 34.039106°N 118.584093°W
- Website: choladathaicuisine.co

Cholada Thai was a Thai restaurant on the Pacific Coast Highway in the unincorporated community of Topanga, California, Los Angeles County, United States. Located adjacent to the city of Malibu, it was destroyed in the Palisades Fire in January 2025.

The restaurant was known for serving traditional Thai food in a relaxed beachside spot off the Pacific Coast Highway.

== History ==
Sawai Theprian and her husband Nikorn "Nick" Sriwichailumpan bought Cholada Thai in 1999. It was a family owned business, with Theprian and Sriwichailumpan's daughters working at the restaurant. The restaurant was located off of the Pacific Coast Highway and next to the Topanga Ranch Hotel. In 2001, Cholada Thai's property was acquired by California State Parks and incorporated into Topanga State Park.

In 2025, Cholada Thai in Malibu was destroyed in the Palisades Fire. However, a location in Long Beach remains open. On January 8, a GoFundMe campaign was started for the restaurant. As of February 2, 2025, it has raised over $130,000. In August 2025, California State Parks informed the owners that they would not renew their lease, so the Malibu location could not be rebuilt.

== Gallery ==
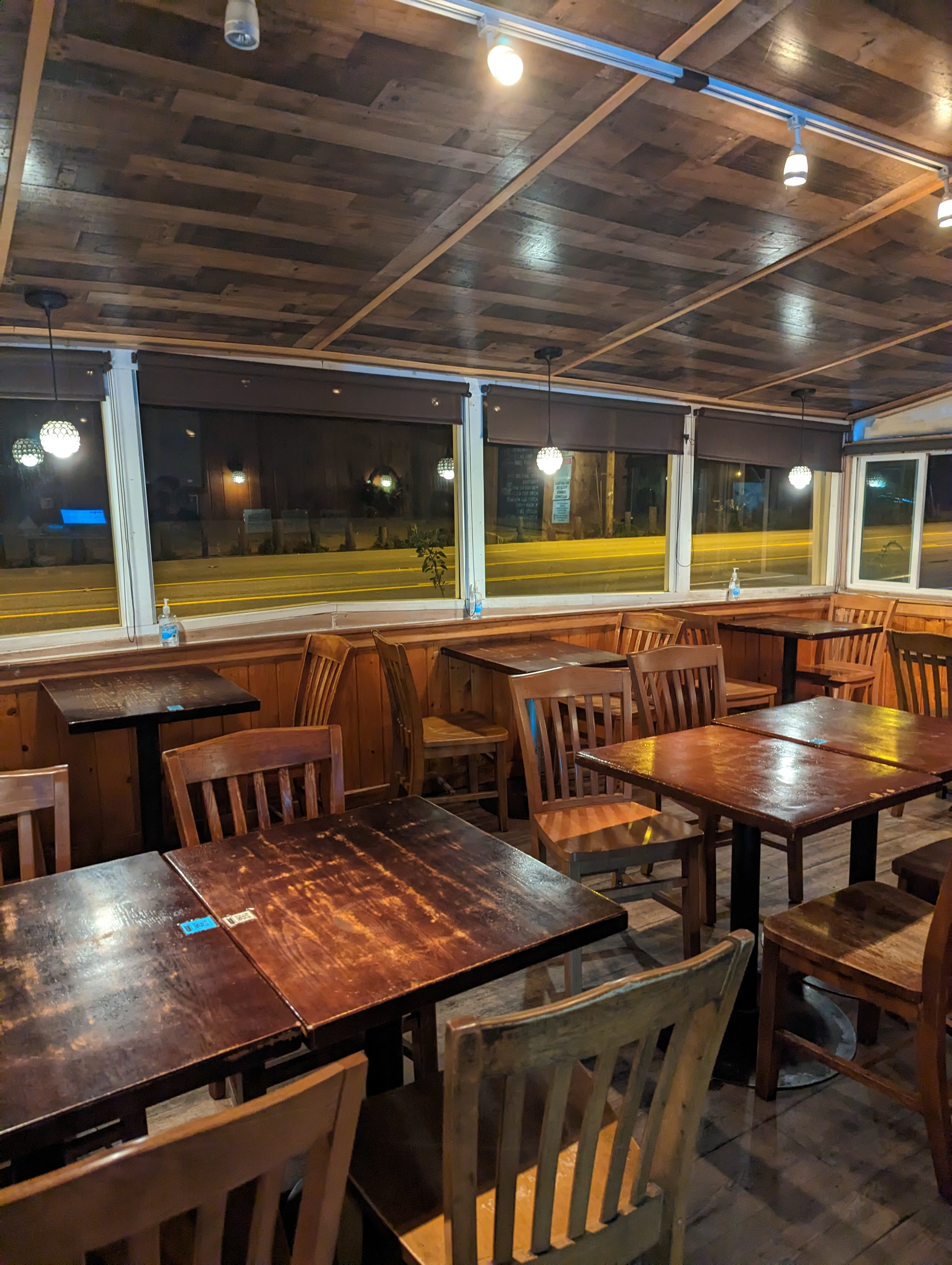
Interior evening photo of the dining room located inside Cholada Thai restaurant in Malibu, California.

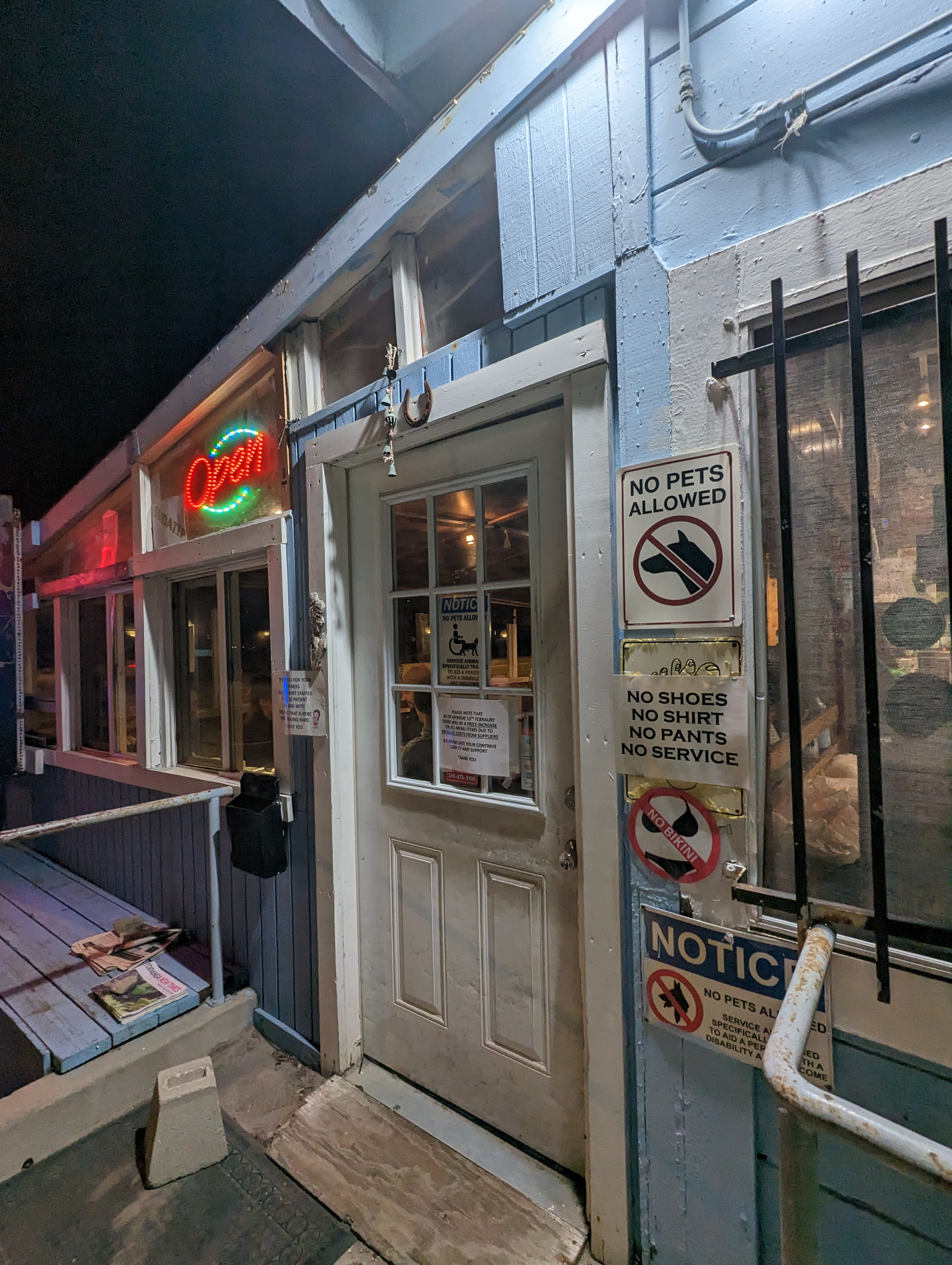
Evening photo of the front door of Cholada Thai Restaurant in Malibu, California. The photo also features a lit "open" LED sign and various notice signs attached on the exterior wall of the building.
