= Ed Lange =

Ed Lange may refer to:

- Ed Lange (American football) (1887–?), American football player
- Ed Lange (photographer) (1920–1995), nudist photographer and publisher
- Edward Lange (1926–1976), American basketball player
