= Aglaothorax longipennis =

Conservation status
- Critically Endangered (IUCN 2.3)

Scientific classification
- Kingdom: Animalia
- Phylum: Arthropoda
- Class: Insecta
- Order: Orthoptera
- Suborder: Ensifera
- Family: Tettigoniidae
- Genus: Aglaothorax
- Species: A. longipennis

Binomial name
- Aglaothorax longipennis Rentz & Weissman, 1981

Synonyms
- Neduba longipennis Rentz & Weissman, 1981

Species of cricket-like animal

Aglaothorax longipennis, the Santa Monica shieldback katydid, is a species of insect in the family Tettigoniidae. It is endemic to the United States.

== Distribution ==
This species has been studied at Topanga State Park.
