= Reel Inn =

Malibu seafood restaurant

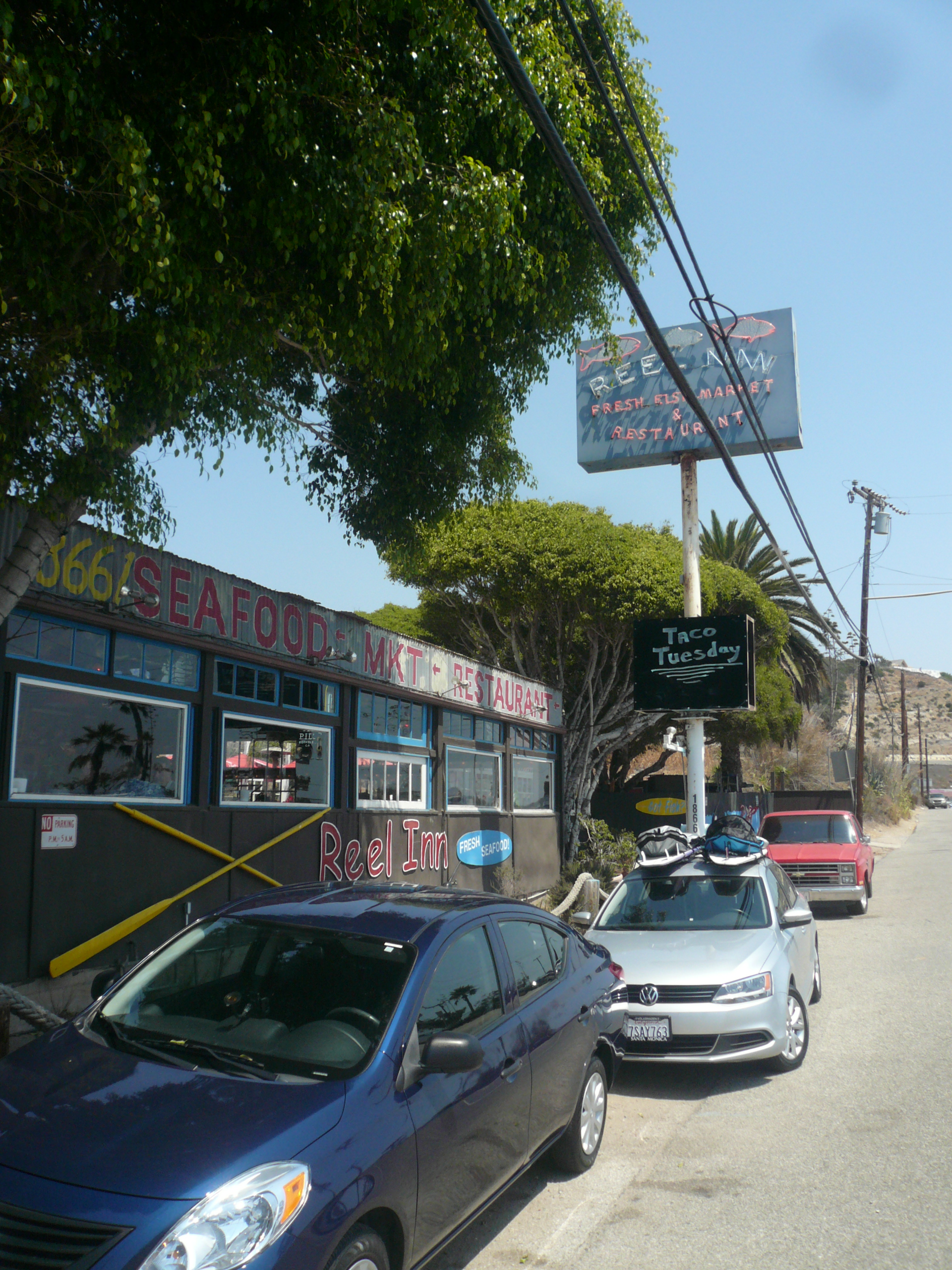
- The Reel Inn in 2016
- Interactive map of Reel Inn

Restaurant information
- Established: 1986
- Closed: January 2025 (temporarily)
- Owners: Andy and Teddy Leonard
- Food type: Seafood
- Location: 18661 Pacific Coast Highway, Malibu, CA 90265 (Mailing address), Los Angeles, California, 90265
- Coordinates: 34°2′23″N 118°34′54″W
- Other information: Destroyed in the Pacific Palisades wildfire in January 2025

The Reel Inn was a seafood restaurant on the Pacific Coast Highway in the unincorporated community of Topanga, California, Los Angeles County, United States. Located adjacent to the city of Malibu, it was opened in 1986 by Andy Leonard; twenty years later, it was described as a "landmark of glorious decrepitude" in the New York Times.

== History ==
An "iconic Los Angeles fish shack," the interior of the Reel Inn was decorated with old surfboards. Food was ordered at an outside counter and served through a window on paper plates. The menu was written daily on a chalkboard, and specials incorporated puns such as "O Sole Mio" and "Salmon Chanted Evening". It was a hangout for actors and musicians including Bruce Springsteen and Tom Petty.

In 2001, the land on which the Reel Inn sits was acquired by a conservation group and became part of Topanga State Park. The California Department of Parks and Recreation identified the Reel Inn as a historical resource and a visitor service, allowing it to remain in business in the park.

=== Destruction ===
It was destroyed in the Palisades Fire in January 2025. The owners announced their intention to rebuild the restaurant and began a GoFundMe account to support their employees on January 22, 2025. In August 2025, California Department of Parks and Recreation informed the owners that they would not renew their lease, so the Reel Inn could not be rebuilt. After a backlash on social media, California Department of Parks and Recreation issued another letter saying that it is committed to "exploring a path forward that makes it possible for the Reel Inn to thrive on State Parks property," indicating that the Reel Inn might still be able to reopen.

In September 2025, The Los Angeles Times reported that California State Parks was working with the office of California Governor Gavin Newsom and local philanthropic groups "to rebuild the infrastructure lost at the site," including the Reel Inn.
