= List of people from Topanga, California =

This article is a list of notable people who were born in and/or have lived in Topanga, California.

== Actors ==
In the 1920s, Topanga Canyon became a weekend getaway for Hollywood silent film stars. The rolling hills and ample vegetation provided both privacy and attractive surroundings for some of the famous.

Actors currently or formerly residing in the Topanga area include:

- John Kassir
- Kadeem Hardison
- Richard Dean Anderson (1980)
- Blu del Barrio
- Lisa Bonet
- Eric Pierpoint
- Kyle Chandler
- John Clark
- Bob Denver
- Tony Dow
- Sharon Farrell
- Teri Garr
- Will Geer
- Billy Gray, and his late mother Beatrice Gray
- Emile Hirsch
- Jennifer Holden
- Dennis Hopper
- Jason Isaacs
- Joshua Jackson
- Katherine Kelly Lang
- Cloris Leachman
- Eric Mabius
- Wendie Malick
- Jason Momoa
- Viggo Mortensen
- Lupita Nyong'o
- Uschi Obermaier, model and actress
- William O'Leary
- Lynn Redgrave
- Molly Ringwald
- Joseph Rosendo
- Ricky Schroder
- Natalie Shaw
- Vinessa Shaw
- Amy Smart
- Sissy Spacek
- Dean Stockwell
- Russ Tamblyn, raising his daughter Amber Tamblyn
- Jeffrey Tambor, with wife Kasia and 2 children
- Barry Watson
- Robin Williams
- Jan-Michael Vincent
- Michael Stoker, Actor and Firefighter served at LACOFD Station 69 in Topanga

== Musicians ==
In the musical fields, in 1952 Woody Guthrie was one of the early American musicians who moved to the Topanga area. As nearby Los Angeles grew into a major music industry capital in the 1950s and 1960s, Topanga Canyon was one of the city's bohemian enclaves some performers preferred living in.

Current and former musicians of the Topanga area include:

- Nick Hexum
- Mark Andes
- Christopher Drew
- Ryan Bingham
- Vic Briggs
- Randy California
- Linda Ronstadt
- Ed Cassidy
- Justin Chancellor
- Alice Cooper
- Pee Wee Crayton
- JC Crowley
- John Densmore
- Neil Diamond
- Danny Elfman in 1989 at the time he was composing the Simpsons Theme (see his MasterClass, Lesson 5)
- Don Felder
- Jay Ferguson
- Mick Fleetwood
- The Flying Burrito Brothers
- Julia Fordham
- Leif Garrett 1970's teen idol
- Marvin Gaye
- Lowell George
- Woody Guthrie
- Colin Hay
- Richie Hayward
- John Helliwell
- Gary Hinman, music teacher and a victim of the Charles Manson gang; lived on Old Topanga Canyon Road in 1969
- Bob Hite
- Jacknife Lee
- Adam Jones
- Bernie Leadon
- John Locke
- Elaine "Spanky" McFarlane
- Charles Milles Manson (né Maddox) cult leader
- Joni Mitchell
- Jim Morrison
- Van Morrison
- Hani Naser (1950–2020), Jordanian-American musician
- Grace Potter
- Billy Preston
- Chris Robinson
- Ryan Ross
- Stephen Stills
- Fred Tackett
- Taj Mahal
- Big Joe Turner
- Alan Wilson
- Neil Young
- David Frank of The System

== Writers ==
- Hugh Lofting, author of Dr Doolittle was living in Topanga at the time of his death in 1947
- Millicent Borges Accardi, NEA poet, lives in Topanga and writes theater reviews for the local Topanga Messenger newspaper
- Hampton Fancher, screenwriter, author, and director, lived for years on Old Canyon Boulevard
- Marija Gimbutas, archaeologist and Indo-European scholar noted for her Kurgan hypothesis and controversial books about Old European religion and society, lived in Topanga for decades
- Al Martinez, Pulitzer Prize winning former L.A. Times columnist, lived for decades in Topanga, often commenting on the nature of life there
- Jon Povill, writer of Total Recall and some episodes of Sliders, as well as producer of Star Trek: The Motion Picture resides there
- Oliver Sacks, neurologist and author, lived on Iowa Trail in Topanga from 1963 to 1965
- Hope Edelman, writer of New York Times bestseller Motherless Daughters

== Others ==
- Henry Hill, gangster; moved to Topanga Canyon after he was put on probation in 2009
- Clement Meighan, archaeologist and UCLA Professor of Archaeology/Anthropology; resided in Topanga over 30 years
