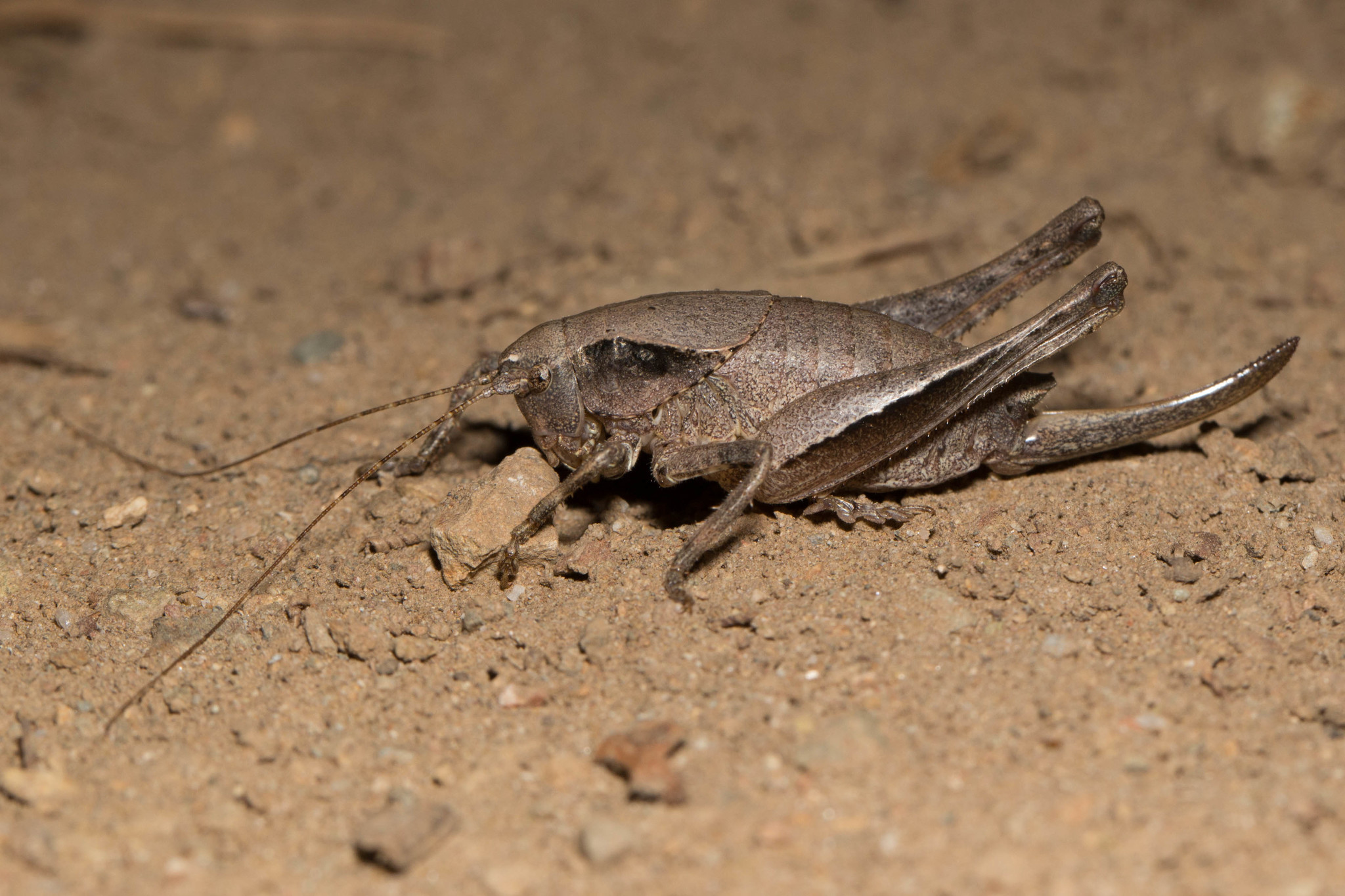
- Aglaothorax morsei

Scientific classification
- Kingdom: Animalia
- Phylum: Arthropoda
- Clade: Pancrustacea
- Class: Insecta
- Order: Orthoptera
- Suborder: Ensifera
- Family: Tettigoniidae
- Subfamily: Tettigoniinae
- Tribe: Nedubini
- Genus: Aglaothorax; Caudell, 1907

= Aglaothorax =

Genus of cricket-like animals

Aglaothorax is a genus of ovate shieldbacks in the family Tettigoniidae. There are about six described species in Aglaothorax.

== Species ==
These six species belong to the genus Aglaothorax:

- Aglaothorax diminutiva (Rentz & Birchim, 1968)^{i c g b} (diminutive shieldback)
- Aglaothorax gurneyi (Rentz & Birchim, 1968)^{i c g b} (Gurney's shieldback)
- Aglaothorax longipennis (Rentz & Weissman, 1981)^{i c g b} (Malibu shieldback)
- Aglaothorax morsei (Caudell, 1907)^{i c g b} (Morse's shieldback)
- Aglaothorax ovata (Scudder, 1899)^{i c g b} (ovate shieldback)
- Aglaothorax propsti (Rentz and Weissman, 1981)^{i c g}

Data sources: i = ITIS, c = Catalogue of Life, g = GBIF, b = Bugguide.net
