= Eagle Rock (Santa Monica Mountains) =

Sandstone pinnacle in Topanga State Park, California, USA

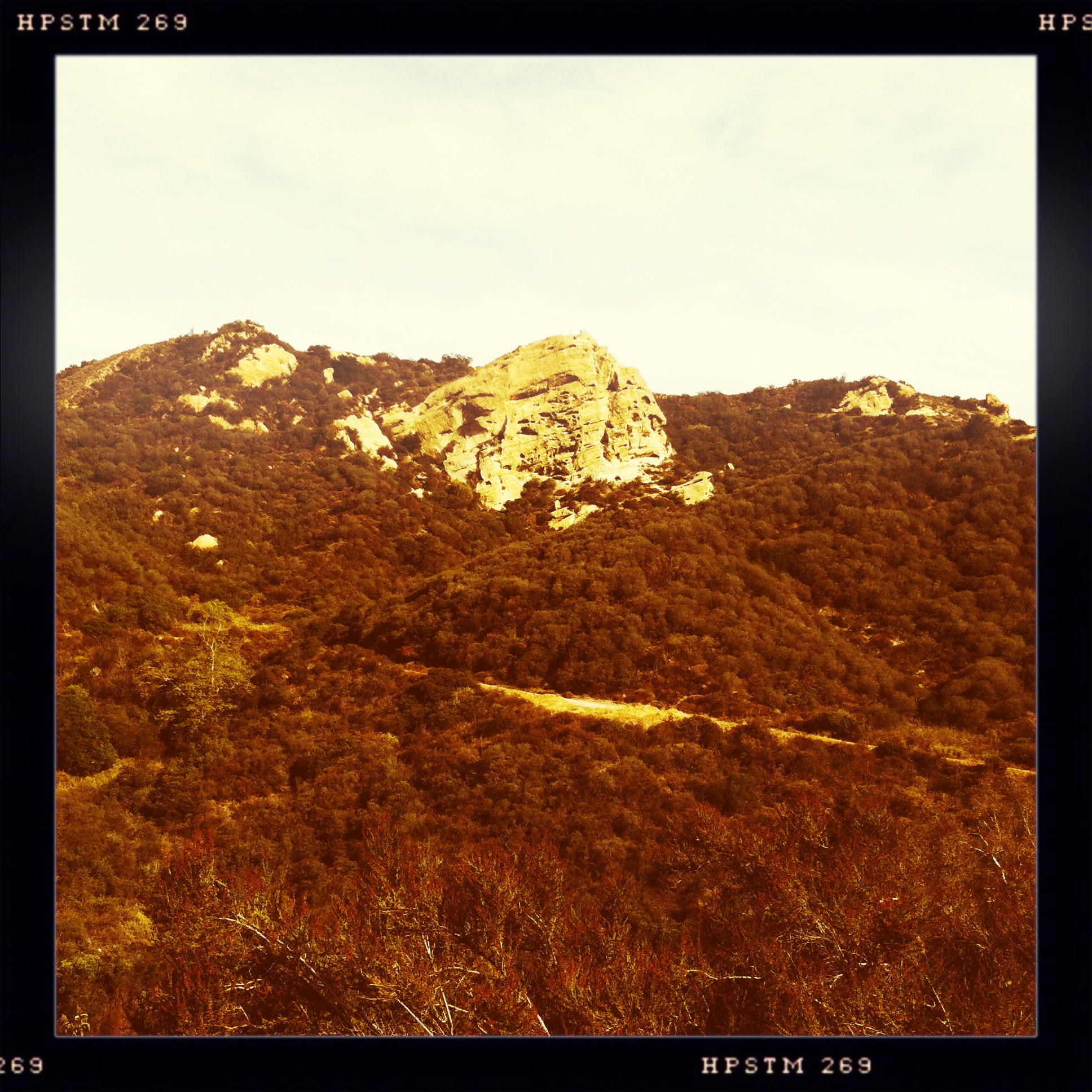
- Eagle Rock, Trippet Ranch, Topanga State Park, Santa Monica Mountains, Southern California

Highest point
- Elevation: 1,957 ft (596 m)
- Coordinates: 34°06′27″N 118°34′16″W

Geography
- Location within California
- Location: Topanga State Park, California, United States
- Parent range: Santa Monica Mountains

Climbing
- Easiest route: hike

Eagle Rock is a prominent sandstone pinnacle in Topanga State Park in the Santa Monica Mountains, California. The original name is "Elephant Rock" as the huge sandstone outcropping looks like an Elephant head when viewed from the north side. When the Park was created the name of the spring to the east, Eagle Spring, was applied to the peak.

The rock can be reached by an easy hike, e.g. with the Musch Trail and Topanga Fire Road of Topanga State Park. The last part consists of an easy climb on one side of the rock to the top, the other side falls down steeply by around 100 ft (30 m).

== See also ==
Eagle Rock (disambiguation)
