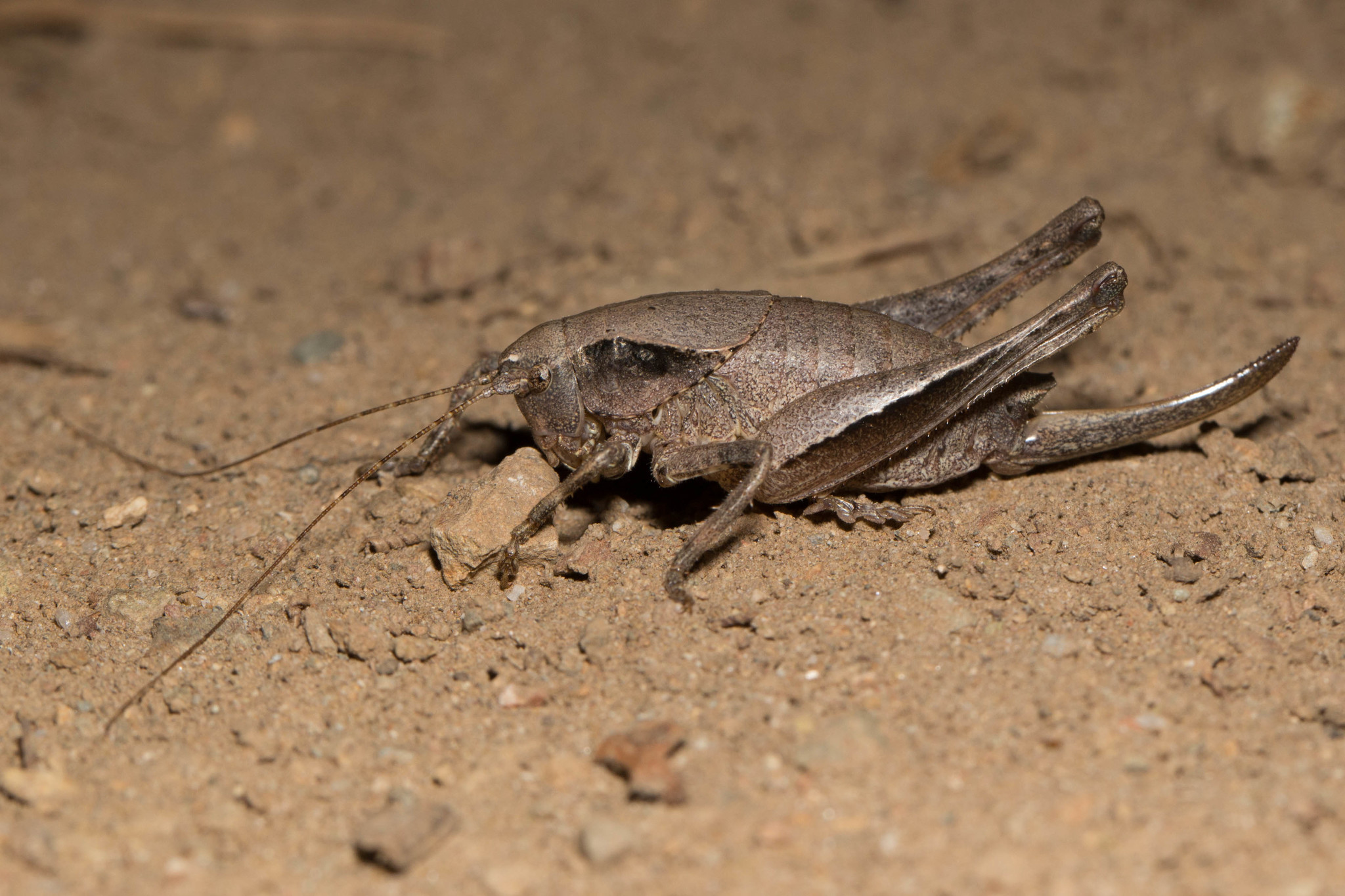
- A. morsei ssp. santacruzae

Scientific classification
- Domain: Eukaryota
- Kingdom: Animalia
- Phylum: Arthropoda
- Class: Insecta
- Order: Orthoptera
- Suborder: Ensifera
- Family: Tettigoniidae
- Tribe: Nedubini
- Genus: Aglaothorax
- Species: A. morsei

Binomial name
- Aglaothorax morsei (Caudell, 1907)

= Aglaothorax morsei =

Species of cricket-like animal

Aglaothorax morsei, commonly known as Morse's shieldback, is a species of shield-backed katydid in the family Tettigoniidae. It is found in North America.

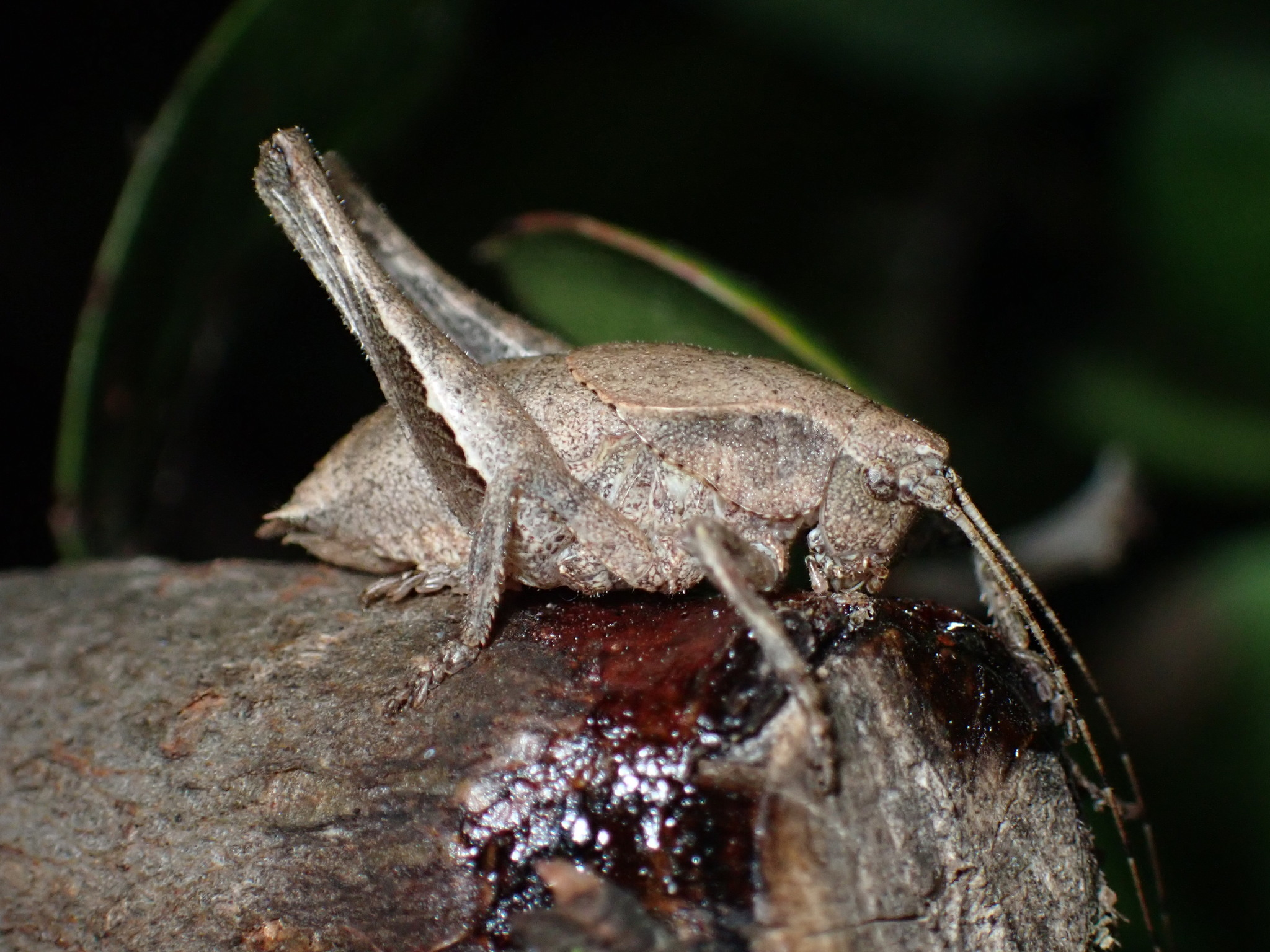
A. m. santacruzae eating tree sap

== Subspecies ==
These six subspecies belong to the species Aglaothorax morsei:

- Aglaothorax morsei costalis (Rentz & Weissman, 1981)
- Aglaothorax morsei curtatus (Rentz & Weissman, 1981)
- Aglaothorax morsei islandica (Rentz & Weissman, 1981)
- Aglaothorax morsei morsei (Caudell, 1907)
- Aglaothorax morsei santacruzae (Rentz & Weissman, 1981)
- Aglaothorax morsei tectinota (Rentz & Weissman, 1981)
