= Hope Edelman =

American writer and essayist (born 1964)

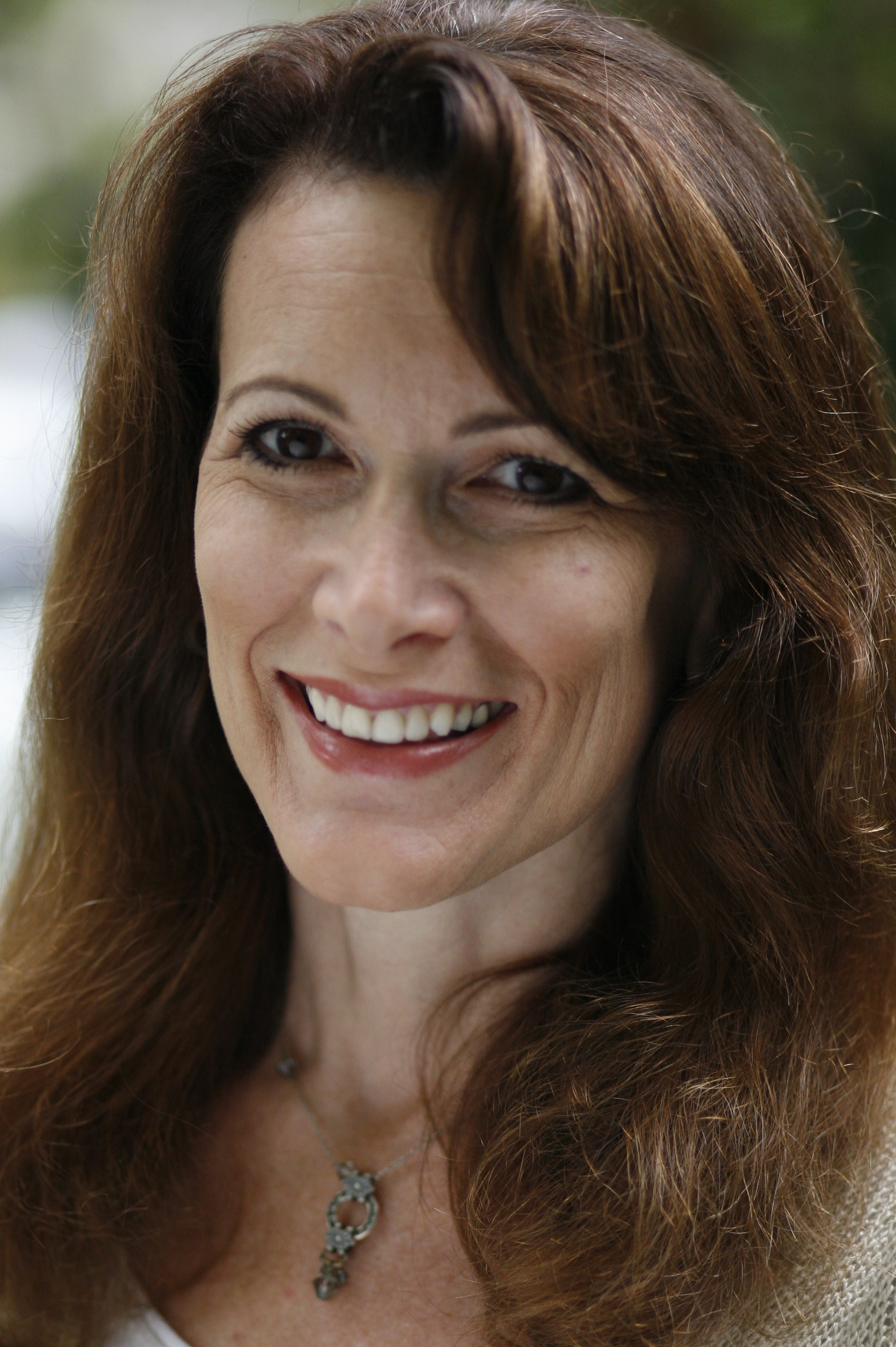
- Born: June 17, 1964 (age 62); New York City, United States
- Occupation: Writer
- Spouse: Uzi Eliahou
- Children: Maya Eliahou, Eden Eliahou
- Writing career
- Genres: Non-fiction, memoir
- Notable works: Motherless Daughters, The Possibility of Everything

Hope Edelman (born June 17, 1964) is an American non-fiction author, essayist, and writing instructor.

== Early life and education ==
Edelman is the author of eight non-fiction books, including Motherless Daughters; Motherless Mothers; the memoir The Possibility of Everything and her most recent book, The Aftergrief. Her writing and teaching has garnered her acclaim as a writer, writing instructor, and expert on early parent loss.

Edelman was born in New York City and spent most of her childhood in suburban Spring Valley, New York. The death of her mother to breast cancer in 1981 was a pivotal moment in her adolescence and became the subject of much of her early writing. She obtained her bachelor's degree from Northwestern University's Medill School of Journalism in Evanston, Illinois. While living in the Chicago area, she interned at Outside magazine. After graduation, she took an editorial job at Whittle Communication in Knoxville, Tennessee, where she discovered a love for the personal essay. She then attended The Nonfiction Writing Program at the University of Iowa, where she studied with Carl Klaus, Mary Swander, and Carol Bly, earning a master's degree in nonfiction writing in 1992.

In 1992, she moved to New York City to write her first book, Motherless Daughters. In 1997, she relocated to Los Angeles, where she married Uzi Eliahou and raised two daughters, Maya and Eden. She has lived in Topanga Canyon, California, for more than two decades.

== Professional career ==
Edelman's first book, Motherless Daughters, was started and sold in proposal form to Addison-Wesley when she was still a graduate student at the University of Iowa. It was published in May 1994. A 17-city tour and extensive media coverage followed, pushing the book to the top of bestseller lists in the U.S., Canada, and Australia. Motherless Daughters spent a total of 24 weeks on the New York Times list and rose to No. 1 in paperback. The book has since been published in fourteen countries, including the United Kingdom, France, Italy, Germany, China, Korea, Poland, Russia, and the Czech Republic.

Moved by the volume and content of thousands of handwritten letters she received from readers, Edelman edited Letters from Motherless Daughters the following year. In 1999, she published Mother of My Mother, an examination of grandmother-granddaughter relationships. Motherless Mothers, an exploration and explanation of how motherless women parent their children differently from the general population, was released by HarperCollins in 2006.

In 2009, Edelman published her first full-length memoir, The Possibility of Everything (Ballantine). The book covers a three-month period during early motherhood when Edelman's three-year-old daughter developed an aggressive imaginary friend, prompting Edelman and her then-husband to make the unconventional choice to bring the child to Mayan healers in Belize in search of a spiritual cure. The story details Edelman's personal journey over those weeks from a “hard-core cynical intellectual” to someone open to the possibility of the unseen. In a starred review, Publishers Weekly called it “a charming memoir full of self-deprecating humor,” and People lauded is as “an intimate account of the struggles of parenting, partnering and faith.”

Her eighth book, The AfterGrief: Finding Your Way Along the Long Arc of Loss, was released in October 2020. Kirkus Reviews called it, “Lucid . . . Noteworthy . . . a timelessly relevant chronicle on enduring grief.” From 2020 to 2021, Edelman appeared on a number of television news shows to talk about COVID-19 deaths and the aftergrief, a period she defines as starting when the most acute phase of grief starts to diminish and extending for the rest of your life.

Edelman has been teaching nonfiction writing for more than twenty years, most recently as an associate faculty member at Antioch University in Los Angeles. She has also taught at the Iowa Summer Writing Festival, the Provincetown Fine Arts Work Center, the University of North Carolina Wilmington, Ohio State University, University of Iowa, UCLA Extension, as well as at Hedgebrook writing retreats on Whidbey Island, Washington, and Tuscany, Italy.

Awards include a Pushcart Prize for creative nonfiction, a New York Times Notable Book designation, and a Community Educator Award from the Association for Death Education and Counseling (ADEC). Since 2016, she has been leading retreats and workshops for motherless women and online support groups for adults who experienced early parent loss.

== Published works ==
- Motherless Daughters
- Letters from Motherless Daughters, ed.
- Mother of My Mother
- Motherless Mothers
- The Possibility of Everything
- Boys Like That
- I'll Show You Mine anthology co-edited with Robin Hemley
- The AfterGrief

== Selected essays ==
- "The Myth of Coparenting" in The Bitch in the House
- "The Three-A.M. Marriage" in Blindsided by a Diaper
- "The Sweetest Sex I Never Had" in Behind the Bedroom Door
- "Specificity and Characters" in Write Now! Nonfiction
- "Home Ec" in Knitting Yarns: Writers on Knitting
- "You Are Here" in Goodbye to All That: Writers on Loving and Leaving New York
- "Bruce Springsteen and the Story of Us" in I'll Tell You Mine
