= Aglaothorax gurneyi =

Scientific classification
- Domain: Eukaryota
- Kingdom: Animalia
- Phylum: Arthropoda
- Class: Insecta
- Order: Orthoptera
- Suborder: Ensifera
- Family: Tettigoniidae
- Tribe: Nedubini
- Genus: Aglaothorax
- Species: A. gurneyi

Binomial name
- Aglaothorax gurneyi (Rentz & Birchim, 1968)

Species of cricket-like animal

Aglaothorax gurneyi, commonly known as Gurney's shieldback, is a species of shield-backed katydid in the family Tettigoniidae. It is found in North America.
