= Aglaothorax diminutiva =

Scientific classification
- Domain: Eukaryota
- Kingdom: Animalia
- Phylum: Arthropoda
- Class: Insecta
- Order: Orthoptera
- Suborder: Ensifera
- Family: Tettigoniidae
- Tribe: Nedubini
- Genus: Aglaothorax
- Species: A. diminutiva

Binomial name
- Aglaothorax diminutiva (Rentz & Birchim, 1968)

Species of cricket-like animal

Aglaothorax diminutiva, the diminutive shieldback, is a species of shield-backed katydid in the family Tettigoniidae. It is found in North America.

== Subspecies ==
These four subspecies belong to the species Aglaothorax diminutiva:

- Aglaothorax diminutiva constrictans (Rentz & Weissman, 1981)
- Aglaothorax diminutiva dactyla (Rentz & Weissman, 1981)
- Aglaothorax diminutiva diminutiva (Rentz & Birchim, 1968)
- Aglaothorax diminutiva malibu (Rentz & Weissman, 1981)
