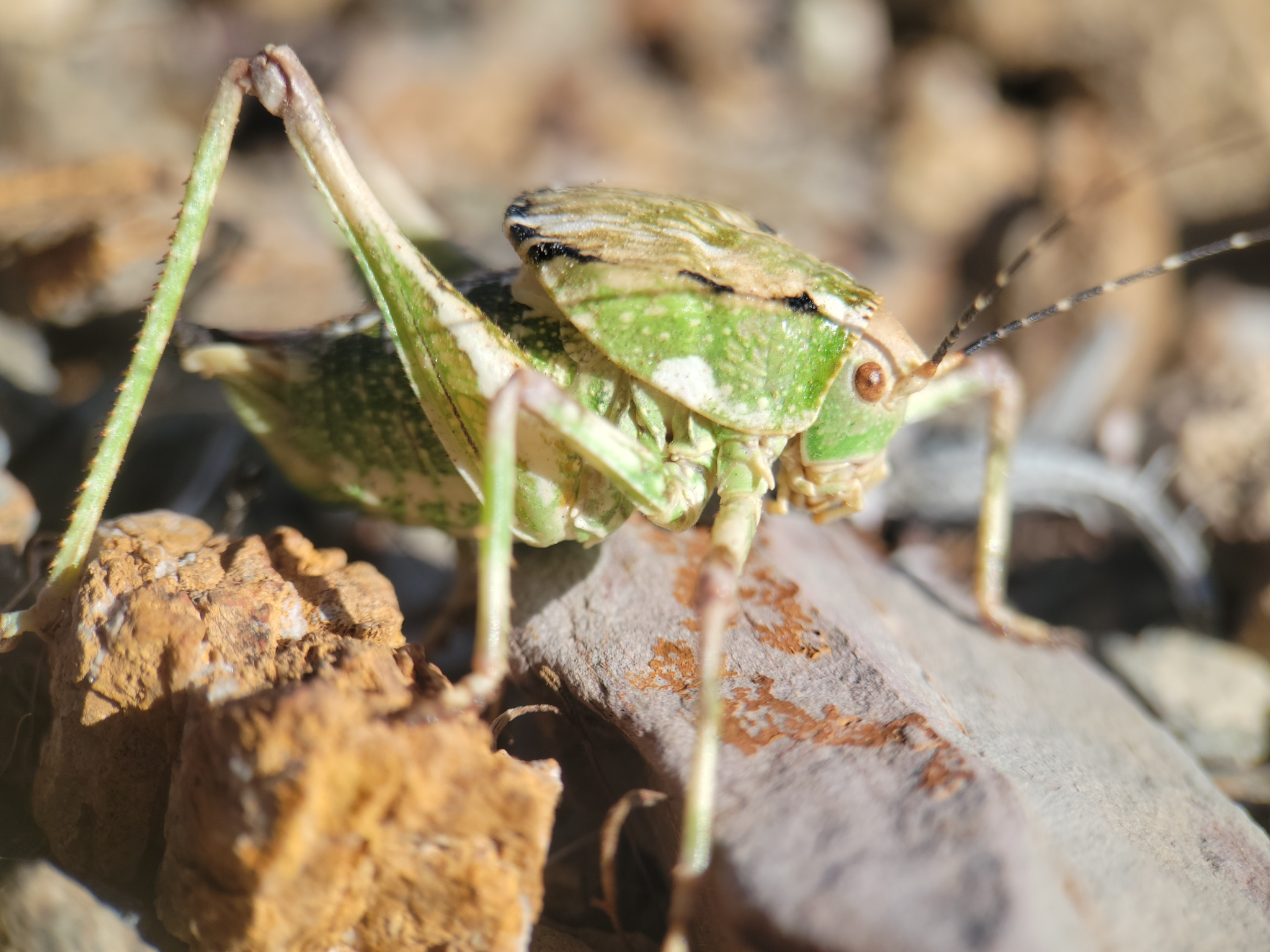

Scientific classification
- Domain: Eukaryota
- Kingdom: Animalia
- Phylum: Arthropoda
- Class: Insecta
- Order: Orthoptera
- Suborder: Ensifera
- Family: Tettigoniidae
- Tribe: Nedubini
- Genus: Aglaothorax
- Species: A. ovata

Binomial name
- Aglaothorax ovata (Scudder, 1899)

= Aglaothorax ovata =

Species of cricket-like animal

Aglaothorax ovata, commonly known as the ovate shieldback or ovate shield-back katydid, is a species of shield-backed katydid in the family Tettigoniidae. It is found in North America. They are 25-40 mm in length and tend to be green and yellow, sometimes with brown mottling. They have short wings and thick shields on their thorax. Adults are active in late summer and fall.

== Subspecies ==
These six subspecies belong to the species Aglaothorax ovata:

- Aglaothorax ovata armiger Rehn & Hebard, 1920
- Aglaothorax ovata gigantea (Rentz & Birchim, 1968)
- Aglaothorax ovata longicaudus Rentz & Birchim, 1968
- Aglaothorax ovata ovata (Scudder, 1899)
- Aglaothorax ovata segnis Rehn & Hebard, 1920
- Aglaothorax ovata tinkhamorum Rentz & Birchim, 1968
