= Malibu Feed Bin =

Pet supply store in California, US

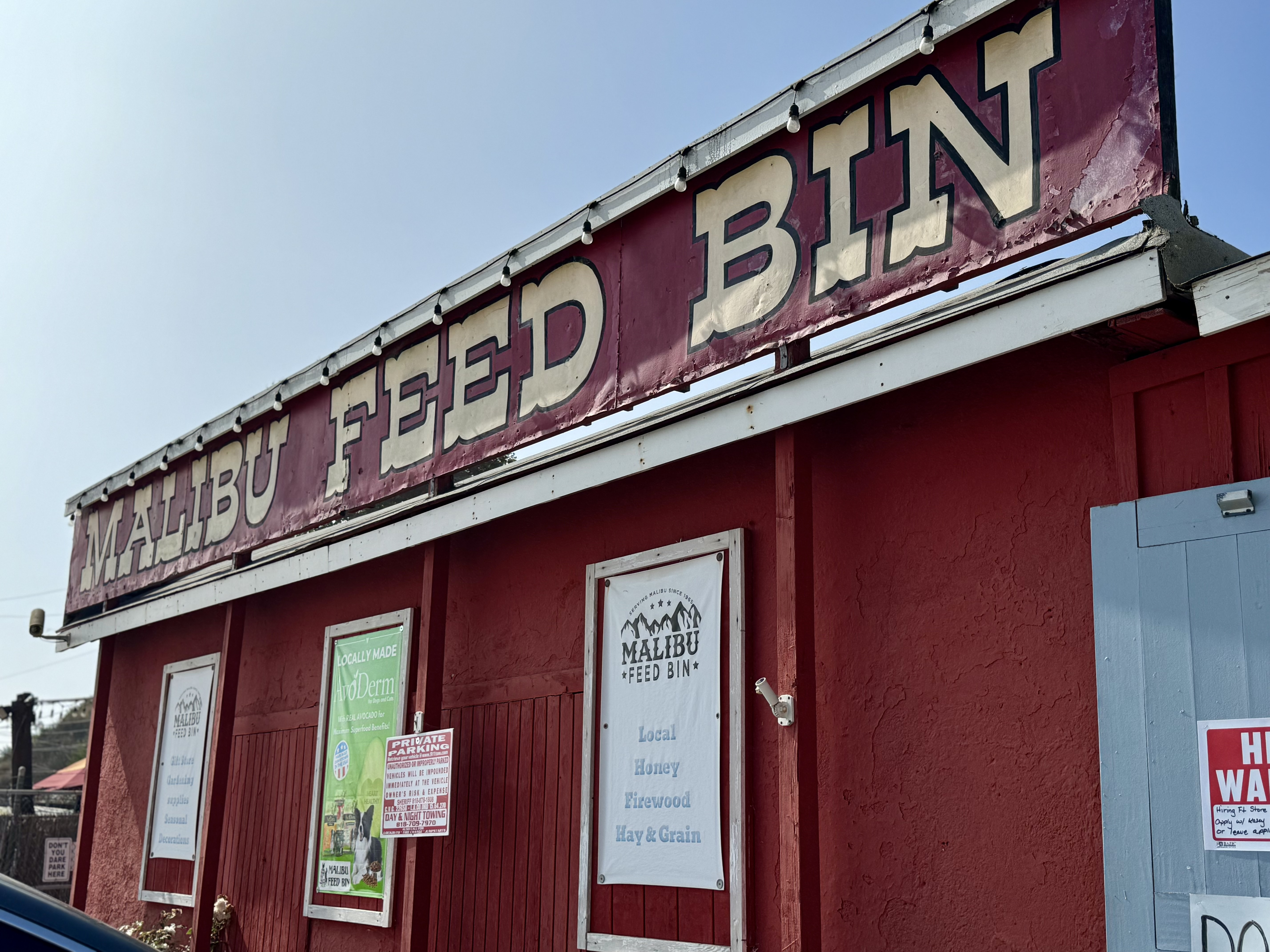
- Malibu Feed Bin storefront several months before its destruction.

General information
- Type: Pet Store, Gift Shop
- Address: 3931 S Topanga Canyon Blvd
- Town or city: Malibu, California
- Country: United States
- Coordinates: 34°02′26.188″N 118°34′46.076″W
- Destroyed: 7 January 2025

The Malibu Feed Bin was a pet supply and gift store in Malibu, California, United States.

Housed in a red barn, the store sold various agricultural and agricultural-themed products such as pet food, animal feed and outdoor furniture and had a gift shop with farm-themed and other seasonal items for sale. It was located at the intersection of Pacific Coast Highway and Topanga Canyon Boulevard. In 1961, Asa "Ace" Smith established the Malibu Feed Bin, the result of a merger of a local ceramics vendor, 101 Imports, and Malibu Feed and Fuel. Two years later, he established the Keep Christ in Christmas Nativity scene, an annual tradition in Malibu, the hay for which was donated by the business to the display's organizers for most of the event's history. The Feed Bin was purchased by Marty and Patricia Morehart in 1966, and remained in their family for four generations.

Heavy rains forced the closure of Topanga Canyon Boulevard in 1969, forcing the business to close for several months. In the 1970s, the Moreharts discovered that the building next door to the Feed Bin was inhabited by members of the Manson Family. Hundreds of 50-pound (23 kg) bags of dog food were stolen from the Malibu Feed Bin between June and October 1977. With total losses amounting to 23 short tons (21,000 kg), the Moreharts offered a $1,000 (equivalent to $5,189 in 2024) reward for information leading to the identity of the thieves. The building survived the 1993 Old Topanga Wildfire.

In September 2001 a 1,659-acre (671 ha) parcel of land encompassing the Malibu Feed Bin was acquired by the California Department of Parks and Recreation to be added to Topanga State Park in a deal facilitated by the American Land Conservancy. Several businesses within the area, including the Malibu Feed Bin, were initially considered for demolition. The California Department of Parks and Recreation hired a historian to determine which businesses were culturally relevant. In 2003, the business was assessed as "not compatible with serving visitors in a state park," but later that year they agreed to make unspecified changes and were able to remain in business. That year, the business put up a white banner, measuring 40 feet (12 m) by 3 feet (0.91 m) with "God Bless Our Troops" written in large blue lettering, in honor of the Moreharts' son, a corporal in the United States Marine Corps fighting in the Iraq War. The sign was stolen over the weekend of November 15–16, 2003.

The building was destroyed in the Palisades Fire on January 7, 2025.

== See also ==
- 2025 California wildfires
