= Edward Lange =

American basketball player

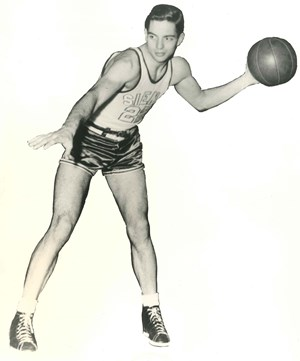
Ed Lange at Siena College

Edward "Eddie" Lange (1926–1976) was an American basketball player.

== Siena ==
A 6'1" guard, Lange was a star at Siena College, where he was team captain from 1947–1949. He was the school's first 1,000 point scorer and the second athlete named to its Hall of Fame in 1965. He was named the Most Valuable Player of the 1950 National Catholic Invitation Tournament, which Siena won after defeating Saint Francis University 57–50 in the championship game. In an opening round game of the same tournament against Providence College, Siena won 86–49 behind Lange's 25 points, including 17 in the final ten minutes of the contest. He drew interest from the Washington Capitols of the NBA as a potential draft pick.

== Personal life ==
Lange served as a radioman in the US Navy prior to his enrollment at Siena. He was elected to the Siena College Sports Hall of Fame in 1965. He went on to cover Siena men's basketball as both a radio and television game analyst.

Lange married his high school sweetheart, Mary ("Dot") Magee. Their six children include Barbara Jerard, Edward M. Lange (deceased), Linda Laudato, Ellen McCormack, Timothy Lange, and Marybeth Cassala. Ed and Dot raised their children in the Capital Region of New York State.

Governor Nelson Rockefeller appointed him the first director of the Affirmative Action office in the New York State Department of Labor.

Lange died at the age of 50 on November 17, 1976 following a long battle with cancer.
