= Ed Lange (photographer) =

American photographer

Ed Lange (1920 - 1995) was a nudist photographer, and a publisher of many nudist pamphlets and magazines showing the nudist lifestyle.

As well as founding the publisher Elysium Growth Press, he was the founder and president of the Elysium Institute in Topanga Canyon, California, and a Vice-President of the International Naturist Federation. His free love ideals placed him in the sexual revolution movement of the 1960s and 1970s. He also was very active in the Western Sunbathing Association and in the first stirrings of the Free Beach movement in the 1960s in California. Lange was originally a fashion photographer who worked for Vogue, Harper's Bazaar and Life magazines as well as a studio photographer at Paramount and Conde Nast in Los Angeles.

A few months before his death, he was named Citizen of the Year by the Topanga Chamber of Commerce.

== Books ==
- Family Naturism in Europe: A Nudist Pictorial Classic by Ed Lange
- Family Naturism in America: A Nudist Pictorial Classic by Ed Lange
- Fun in the Sun: Nudist and Naturist Living by Ed Lange (editor)
- "N" Is for Naked (Paperback) by Ed Lange
- Nudist Magazines of the 50s & 60s (The Nudist Nostalgia Series, Book 1) by Ed Lange, Stan Sohler. ISBN 1-55599-046-0 (pbk.: bk. 1)
- Nudist Magazines of the 50s & 60s (The Nudist Nostalgia Series, Book 2) by Ed Lange, Stan Sohler. ISBN 1-55599-048-7 (pbk.: bk. 2)
- Nudist Magazines of the 50s & 60s (The Nudist Nostalgia Series, Book 3) by Ed Lange, Stan Sohler. ISBN 1-55599-051-7 (pbk.: bk. 3)
- Nudist Magazines of the 50s & 60s (The Nudist Nostalgia Series, Book 4) by Ed Lange, Stan Sohler. ISBN 1-55599-054-1 (pbk.: bk. 4)
- Nudist Nudes by Ed Lange

== Magazines ==
- "Ankh"
- "Exposure & Design"
- "Nude Lark" (evolved from "Nude Look")
- "Nude Look"
- "Nude Living"
- "Nude Photography"
- "Nudism Today"
- "Nudist Adventure"
- "Nudist Holiday"
- "Sundial"
- "Sundisk" (evolved from "Sundial")
- "Sunrise"
- "The Nudist Idea"
- "Young and Naked"

== See also ==
- The American Association for Nude Recreation (AANR)
- Clothes free organizations
- List of public outdoor clothes free places
- Naturism
- Nudism
- Nudity in sport
- Public nudity
- Skinny dipping
