= Topanga State Park =

State park in Los Angeles County, California, US

- IUCN category III (natural monument or feature)
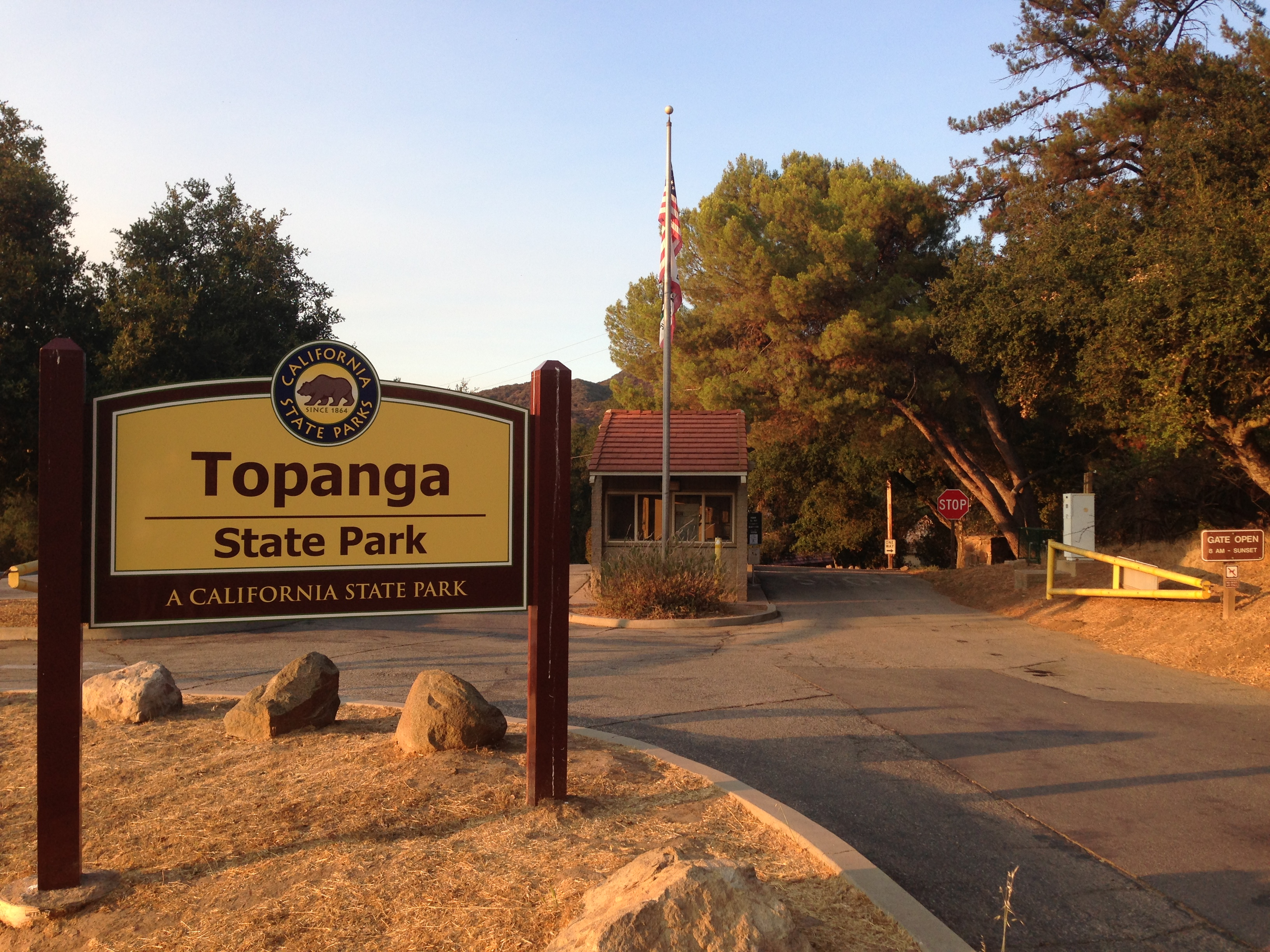
- The entrance to the Trippet Ranch area of Topanga State Park

- Location within the Los Angeles metropolitan area Location within California Location within the United States
- Location: Los Angeles County, California, United States
- Nearest city: Los Angeles, CA
- Coordinates: 34°5′43″N 118°32′56″W
- Area: 11,000 acres (45 km^{2})
- Established: 1964
- Governing body: CA Dept. of Parks & Recreation

Topanga State Park (/təˈpæŋɡə/) is a California state park located in the Santa Monica Mountains, within Los Angeles County, California. It is part of the Santa Monica Mountains National Recreation Area.

The park is located adjacent to the Topanga neighborhood of Los Angeles. Covering 11,000 acres (4,500 ha), with 36 miles (58 km) of trails and unimproved roads, the park's boundaries stretch from Topanga Canyon to Pacific Palisades and Mulholland Drive. There are more than 60 trail entrances. Topanga State Park is not only the largest park in the Santa Monica Mountains, but it is also considered the largest park located in the limits of a city.

== History ==
=== Native American ===
The word Topanga is an old Shoshonean language word meaning 'above' and referring to the canyon settlement being above the flood waters of Topanga Creek. The Tongva and Chumash peoples inhabited the area for thousands of years. The land of Topanga Canyon was originally inhabited by Native American groups collectively referred to as the Topanga Culture, including the Chumash and Tongva.

=== Colonial ===
Juan Rodriguez Cabrillo first claimed California for Spain in 1542. The Topanga region was not colonized until after the establishment of the Pueblo de Los Angeles and Mission San Fernando Rey de España in the late 1700s. When Mexico gained its independence from Spain in 1821, control of Alta California went to the new government. In 1828 the Mexican Governor of Alta California granted Francisco Sepulveda provisional title to the more than 30,000 acres (120 km^{2}) called Rancho San Vicente y Santa Monica. The rancho included the eastern portion of the City of Santa Monica, Santa Monica Canyon, and the mountains to the ridge line on the west bank of Topanga Creek. The land remained relatively unused, except for flat portions used for crops and grazing. The steeper sections were deemed unusable, even for sheep and cattle.

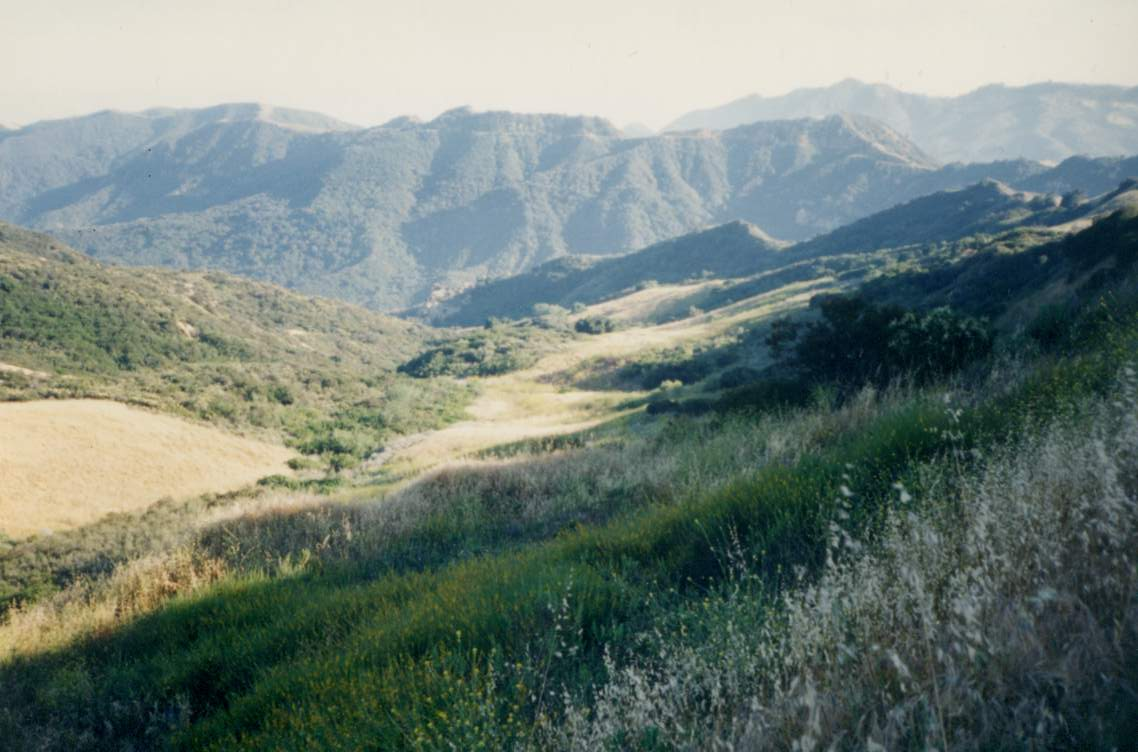
Trippet Ranch area of the park.

=== American ===
California became part of the United States in 1848, and a state in 1850. Eventually ownership of the Rancho San Vicente y Santa Monica Mexican land grant was confirmed by the U.S. Land Claims Commission. The land was made available under the Homestead Act. Among the many homestead patents filed in the Santa Monica Mountains, the one filed by a beekeeper named McAtee was for the western edge of the Rancho San Vicente y Santa Monica, and area along what became Entrada Road, the current main entrance to Topanga State Park.

In the 1920s, the canyon became a popular weekend get-away destination for residents of growing Los Angeles. Summer cabins were built along Topanga Creek and throughout the area in subdivisions in the surrounding hills. In this same trend, in 1917, Oscar A. Trippet, Sr. bought half of the McAtee homestead, which he and his family used as a get-away from the city. When Trippet died in 1923, his son, Oscar Jr., commissioned Los Angeles architect Summer Spaulding to build the superintendent's house, horse stables, and a skeet lodge. A stock pond was also built which is still located inside the park at the northeast corner of the parking lot. The Trippet family owned of the land until 1963, when it was sold to a developer.

The next year, 1964, a park bond was approved by voters to purchase Trippet Ranch and some adjoined land. Topanga State Park was opened to the public in 1974. Its land includes more than 7,500 acres (3,000 ha) from the Rancho San Vicente y Santa Monica land grant. In 2001, 1,500 acres (610 ha) was acquired from the Palisades Highlands and another 1,659 acres (671 ha) was added in 2002, near the mouth of the Topanga Creek. The California Department of Parks and Recreation hired a historian to determine which businesses were culturally relevant. Residents and businesses were evicted and some buildings were demolished.

Businesses that remained included Cholada Thai, Malibu Feed Bin, Reel Inn, Topanga Ranch Motel, and Wylie’s Bait & Tackle Shop. On January 8, 2025, the Palisades Fire destroyed the structures housing these businesses. The fire also damaged a habitat site for monarch butterflies in Lower Topanga Canyon.

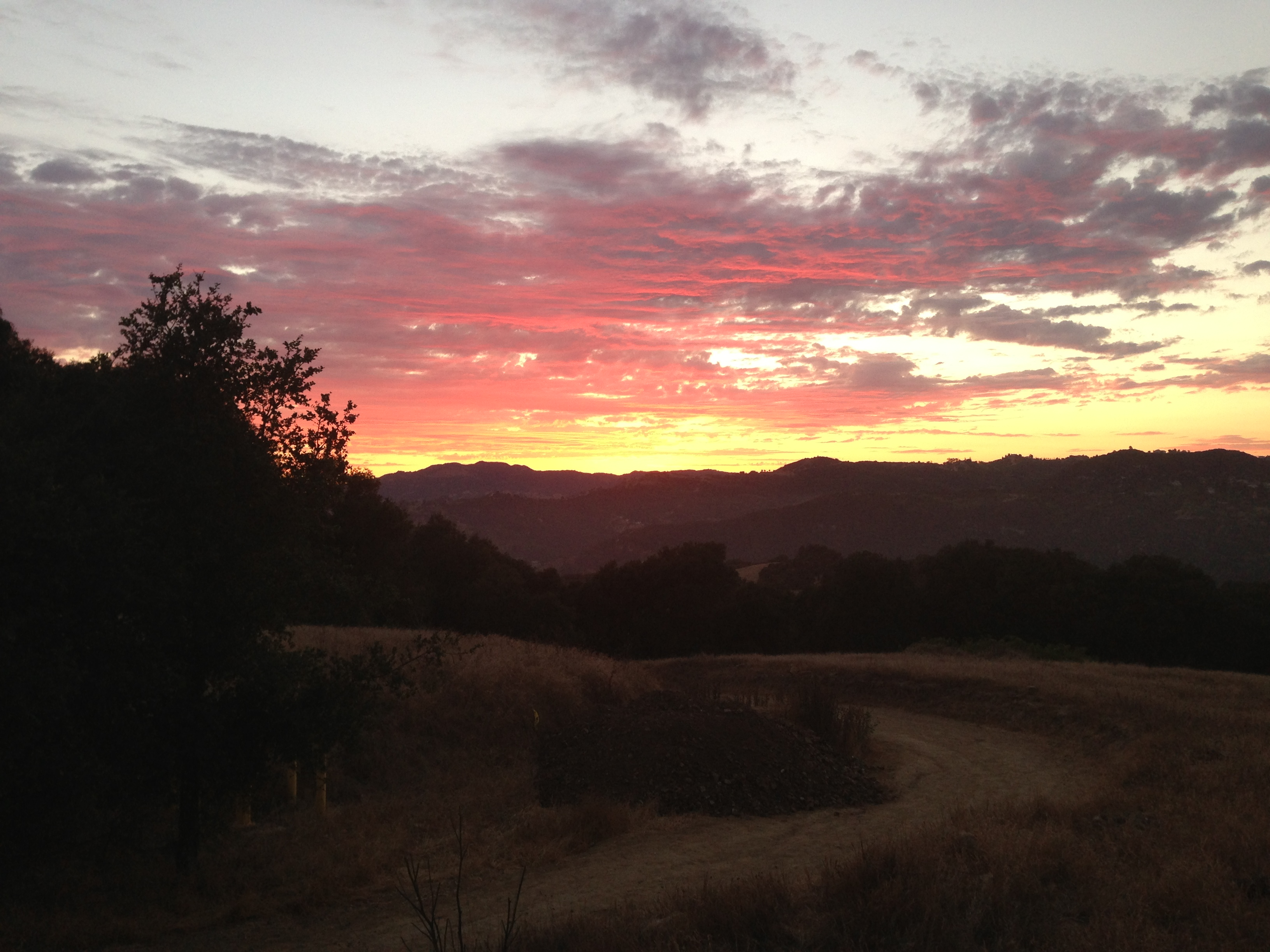
Sunset on the trail to Trippet Ranch.

== Natural history ==
Geologically, the park has many sedimentary sandstone rock formations, marine fossils, exposed faults, and volcanic intrusions.

=== Flora ===
The primary habitats in the park are of the Coastal sage scrub and montane chaparral and woodlands ecoregions. In Trippet Ranch there is a significant area of California oak woodland. The smaller habitats include bay laurel woodland (Umbellularia californica), walnut woodland (Juglans californica), and grassland savannah. The various types of plants and habitats are due to microclimate differences across the park.

=== Fauna ===
There are over eighty mammal species and more than sixty reptile and amphibian species. Snakes present include the Southern Pacific rattlesnake (Crotalus oreganus helleri). Topanga State Park is home to many species of migratory and resident bird species.

== Recreation ==
Points of interest in the park include: Eagle Rock, Eagle Spring Trail, and Hub Junction. Three historical attractions of the park are Trippet Ranch buildings, Will Roger's cabin, and the Josepho Barn.

=== Trails ===
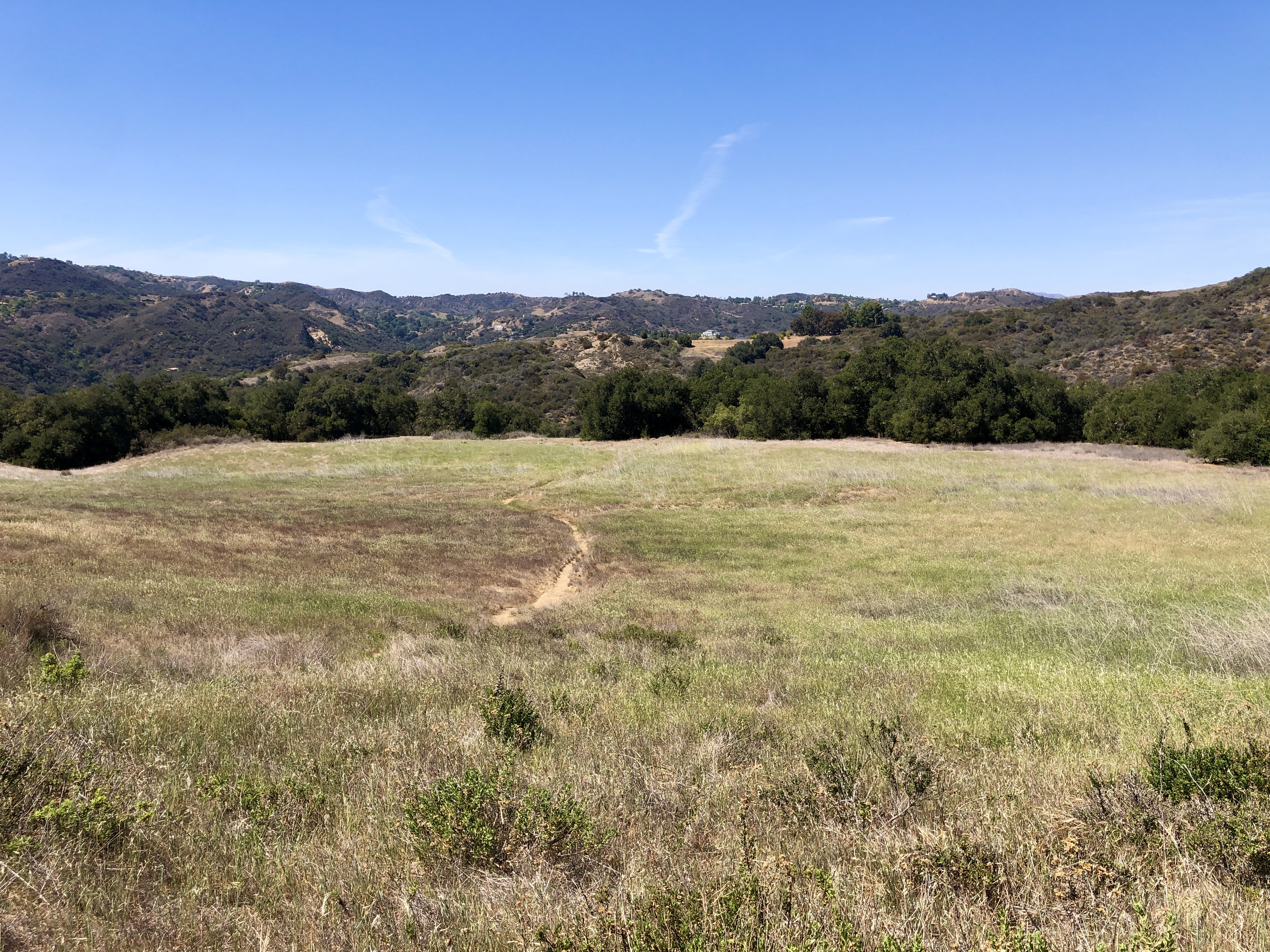
Lower part of the Musch Trail heading up to Eagle Rock

Many trails exist within the park, which are accessible to hikers, mountain bikers, and horseback riders, as posted. The primary trailheads are at the Trippet Ranch area, including for the Musch Trail, passing prominent Eagle Rock. Many trails also are wider dirt fire roads. Unpaved portions of Mulholland Drive are accessible through the Temescal Fire Road and Mulholland Drive.

The Backbone Trail System, a multi-use long-distance trail spanning nearly 70 miles (110 km) across the Santa Monica Mountains, passes through Topanga State Park. It can be accessed via the Trippet Ranch trailhead.

The Santa Inez Trail is accessible from Trippet Ranch on the west, or the Palisades Highlands neighborhood on the east. The trail's lower section follows Santa Inez Creek through riparian habitats, and then climbs through unique and massive sandstone formations to the Topanga Fire Road and Trippet Ranch.

=== Topanga Nature Center ===
The Topanga Nature Center houses a collection of mounted native animals and birds, as well as hands-on displays of natural artifacts. It is dedicated to the flora, fauna and geography of the area. The center is located in the lodge formerly used by Trippet Ranch for skeet shooting, a short walk from the Trippet Ranch parking lot..

== Funding ==
=== California Department of Parks and Recreation ===
The park was on a list of 48 California state parks proposed in January 2008 for closure by California's then-Governor Arnold Schwarzenegger as part of a deficit reduction program. In protest, environmentalists and area residents collected more than 17,000 signatures asking that the closure idea be halted, with the petition delivered to the governor by a symbolic delegation of school children. This direct public action was credited with averting the proposed closure.

In July 2012, it was reported that nearly $54 million in "hidden" funds was in the possession of California's state park system, creating widespread anger. The funds were more than enough to have covered any of the alleged state park budget shortfalls, and State Parks Director Ruth Coleman, in charge for a decade, resigned her position, with her second in command being fired. Coleman denied any knowledge of the secret assets. Later, the $54 million figure was reported to be misrepresented, with the actual hidden surplus amounting to $20 million, still enough to cover the alleged shortfall that had prompted the plans to close as many as 70 California state parks. In February 2013 it was revealed that the approximately $20 million had been hidden for as long as 20 years by the California Department of Parks and Recreation.

=== Federal trail improvements ===
In August 2012, Congressman Brad Sherman announced that he secured federal funds to help improve parks and public areas. His first project was to help restore sections of the 65 mile Backbone Trail, one of the most popular trails in the park and the Santa Monica Mountains National Recreation Area. The Congressman said, "The Backbone Trail provides thousands of hikers, bicyclists and other outdoor enthusiasts with an unparalleled recreational experience through the heart of the Santa Monica Mountains. These improvements will enhance that experience and improve safety for everyone that uses this popular trail." The money is going to go to clearing back brush on the trails, fixing and preventing landslides along the trail, and repairing the Chicken Bridge in the park. Hikers have reported significant improvements to the trails, and the project was completed in 2013.

== See also ==
- California chaparral and woodlands
- Chaparral
- List of flora of the Santa Monica Mountains
