= Topanga, California =

Census-designated place in Los Angeles County, California, US

Topanga, California Topaa'nga (Tongva)
- Unincorporated community Census-designated place
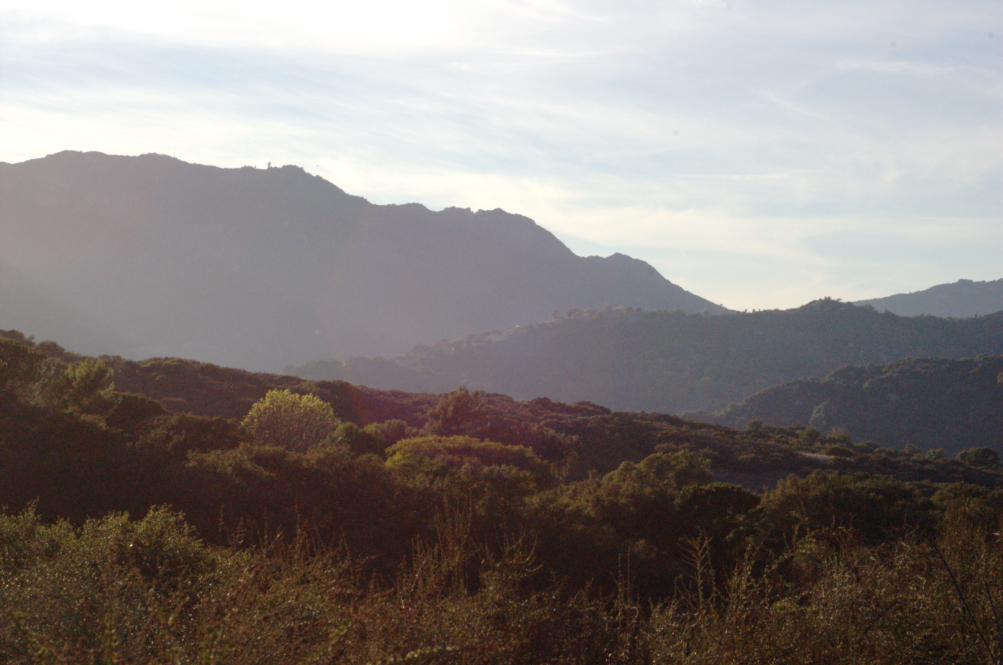
- View of Topanga Canyon from one of the hiking trails

- Location of Topanga in California and Los Angeles County

- Location in the United States Topanga (California) Topanga (the Los Angeles metropolitan area)
- Coordinates: 34°05′23″N 118°36′16″W
- Country: United States
- State: California
- County: Los Angeles
- Named for: Topaa'nga, a Tongva word perhaps meaning "where the mountain meets the sea" or "the place above"

Government
  - Senate: Ben Allen (D)
  - Assembly: Jacqui Irwin (D)
  - U. S. Congress: Brad Sherman (D)

Area
  - Total: 19.134 sq mi (49.558 km^{2})
  - Land: 19.127 sq mi (49.538 km^{2})
  - Water: 0.0077 sq mi (0.020 km^{2}) 0.04%
- Elevation: 1,084 ft (330 m)

Population (2020)
  - Total: 8,560
  - Density: 448/sq mi (173/km^{2})
- Time zone: UTC-8 (PST)
  - Summer (DST): UTC-7 (PDT)
- ZIP code: 90290
- Area codes: 310/424, 747/818
- GNIS feature ID: 2583164
- FIPS code: 06-78960

Topanga (Tongva: Topaa'nga) is an unincorporated community in western Los Angeles County, California, United States. Located in the Santa Monica Mountains, the community exists in Topanga Canyon and the surrounding hills. The narrow southern portion of Topanga at the coast is between the city of Malibu and the Los Angeles neighborhood of Pacific Palisades. For statistical purposes, the United States Census Bureau has defined Topanga as a census-designated place (CDP). As of the 2020 census the population of the Topanga CDP was 8,560. The ZIP Code is 90290 and the area code is primarily 310, with 818 only at the north end of the canyon. It is in the 3rd County Supervisorial district.

Topanga is the largest unincorporated area in Los Angeles County by area, although a majority of it is undeveloped. The 2025 Palisades Fire had a severe impact on the community with the devastation of structures destroyed, forcing evacuations, and multiple road closures.

== Etymology ==
Topanga is the name given to the area by the local Tongva people, and may mean "where the mountain meets the sea" or "a place above". The name in the Tongva language, Topaa'nga, has a root, topaa'-, that likely comes from the Chumash language. It was the western border of their territory, abutting the Chumash tribe that occupied the coast from Malibu northward. Bedrock mortars are carved into rock outcroppings in many locations.

== History ==
=== First peoples ===
People have been living in the location now designated as Topanga State Park for thousands of years, with an unearthed village from around 8,000 years ago. Notable archeological excavations have occurred in a location dubbed the "Tank Site" after its publicization in 1946. Topanga locals had known about it since at least the 1920s. Artifacts at this site have included handstones, scraper plates, hammer-stones, choppers, and milling slabs. In 1947 archeologists Robert Heizer and Edwin Lemert inferred a possible "Topanga type culture" singled out from the larger Native American population. Although other sites have been found, they are not considered to have been permanent villages.

After an initial excavation by Adan Treganza and Consuelo Malamud, steatite presence was suggested as a possible sign of contact with Santa Barbara Channel Island cultures. Their initial report concluded "that factors unknown to us must have been present" to facilitate permanent settlement, until a local resident directed them to two nearby springs. What could be determined with "little doubt" was that the culture appeared "strongly inclined toward a seed-gathering economy", though maybe not exclusively. The team's final report would be published in 1958, containing more complete analysis of burials which were seemingly conducted as a formal practice, as opposed to burials deemed spontaneous. Formal burials were determined to have fully extended bodies who's heads orientated southward. Topanga Canyon itself had human remains removed from the "Santa Maria Site" in 1987.

In 2015 and 2019, based on a larger set of findings since the earliest excavations, Richard Fitzgerald and Scott Green felt evidence supported placing Topanga culture within the Milling Stone Horizon period.

=== Colonization and development ===
Topanga was colonized by the Spanish in 1839. The main road through the canyon, Topanga Canyon Boulevard, was built by inmate labor in 1911. In the 1920s a summer camp was established called Camp Wildwood, later repurposed as a resort. During the 1960s, Topanga Canyon also became a magnet to many young new artists.

==== Bohemian enclave ====
Hollywood actor Will Geer lost his Santa Monica home after being blacklisted in 1951 for invoking the 5th amendment while under questioning by the House Committee on Un-American Activities. Geer's wife Herta Ware reportedly chose a spot in the mountains that Geer would purchase to grow vegetables. Soon after, other performing artists such as Arlo Guthrie, Pete Seeger, and Ramblin' Jack Elliott "began assembling" on the plot and would act out impromptu performances. In 1973 the land officially incorporated into the current performing arts amphitheater known today as Theatricum Botanicum (botanical theater). Topanga would end up garnering a reputation as a destination for artists, forming what author Evelyn McDonnell considered a "folk and proto-hippie scene".

In 1965, George Herms settled in the area, socializing with artists Wallace Berman and actors Dean Stockwell, Billy Gray, and Russ Tamblyn. For a time Neil Young lived in Topanga, recording most of After the Gold Rush (1970) at his home. The convicted murderer and cult leader Charles Manson lived for a time in Topanga, where he briefly befriended Young and Dennis Wilson of The Beach Boys. Members of the Manson Family cult began their killing spree on July 31, 1969, with the murder of Topanga resident Gary Hinman, a music teacher, whom had opened his home to anyone needing shelter. Peter Alexander moved to Topanga in 1970.

==== Decline and revitalization ====
In the late 1980s a land development firm known as Summerhill got permission to evict Canyon resident Samantha Gann, who rented a house on their 406-acre plot (164 ha). Having apparently filed for bankruptcy, the company indicated intentions to develop the land Gann was living on. Unofficial residents who also lived on the plot, sheltered in the main ranch house, were considered by the Los Angeles Times to be "Topanga Canyon's last major commune" until the mass eviction. Country club developer Christopher Wojciechowski oversaw the eviction personally, planning to make the land into a temporary tree farm before concrete ideas were put into place. Gann was given responsibility by the County animal control to find permanent homes for animals from the commune within 30 days.

A lawsuit was filed to oppose the development on the basis that Native American artifacts were found onsite, indicating it may qualify as a protected cultural zone. It was ultimately dismissed.

A retrospective article by the Los Angeles Times in 2018 views Topanga's "moment of peak cultural relevance" over by the end of the 1970s. It notes that current residents still connect to the town's musical history. In 2021 the New York Times reported that the town amphitheater was drawing in outside audiences in a post-pandemic lockdown intrigue, sometimes nearly maxing out its 299 seats. In 2025 the newspaper considered Topanga to be an outlier compared to nearby canyons that gentrified, writing that "Topanga Canyon has clung to its wildness, its renegade spirit and the durable aura it retains of a one-time redoubt of bootleggers and drug runners." Despite this resistance it has been noted by residents that the financial barrier for entry has increased drastically, filtering those who have been able to buy homes within the community in recent years.

1915 High-angle view of the new Topanga Canyon Boulevard winding down hillside, looking north into the San Fernando Valley.

=== Natural disasters ===
==== 2005 rockslide ====
On January 10, 2005, after heavy rains, a 25-foot, 300-ton boulder rolled down a hillside and landed directly on Topanga Canyon Blvd. Photos of the boulder made international news. The boulder blocked traffic on the road for around a week, cutting off thru traffic between the San Fernando Valley and the Pacific Coast Highway (CA State Route 1). Six-foot holes were drilled and low-yield explosives were used to partially implode the boulder. A previous attempt with dynamite failed due to heavy saturation by rain.

==== 2024 mudslide ====
On March 9, 2024, a 300 ft translational landslide covered Topanga Canyon Boulevard, blocking its use for travel. It was not reopened for months, leading to Governor of California Gavin Newsom declaring a state of emergency, as it is the main road for those passing through the town or residents needing to evacuate. An alternate route through Tuna Canyon Road had a temporary traffic light placed at its intersection with Pacific Coast Highway. The mudslide was reportedly 15,000 cubic yards worth of debris, though initially estimated to be between 50 and 90,000.

==== Palisades Fire (2025) ====
The January 2025 Southern California wildfires, particularly the Palisades Fire, ravaged through Topanga State Canyon and parts of the community during extremely high drought conditions and very severe Santa Ana winds. The Palisades Fire devastated the lower portion of the community, with most homes near the Topanga State Beach destroyed, along with Topanga Ranch Motel and Topanga State Park. The entirety of Topanga was put under an evacuation order.

Due to Topanga's remote environment, further evacuation plans were considered nonviable and a shelter-in-place policy was adopted for future wildfires instead. It was later clarified to only apply to specifically those in hard to reach areas. Cal Fire also identified that, of the more than 2,400 developments in California with 30 or more residences considered a significant fire risk and only one evacuation route, nine of them were in Topanga.

== Geography ==
=== Topanga Canyon ===
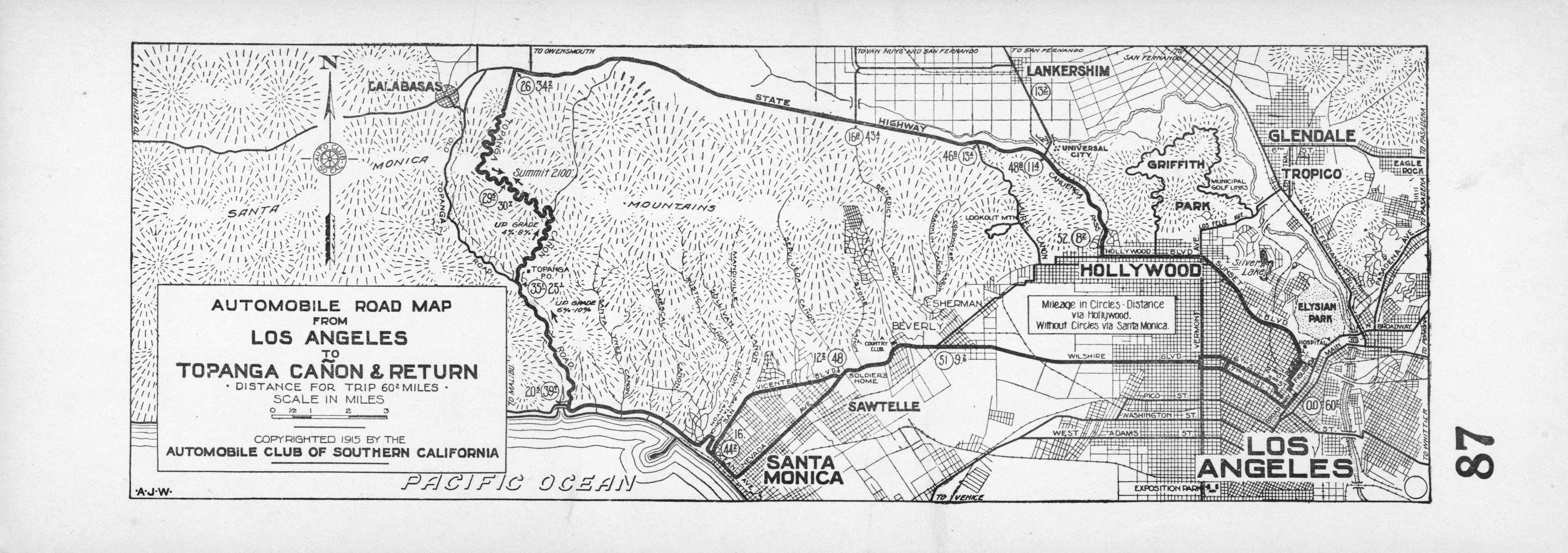
1915 road map of Los Angeles to Topanga Canyon & Return

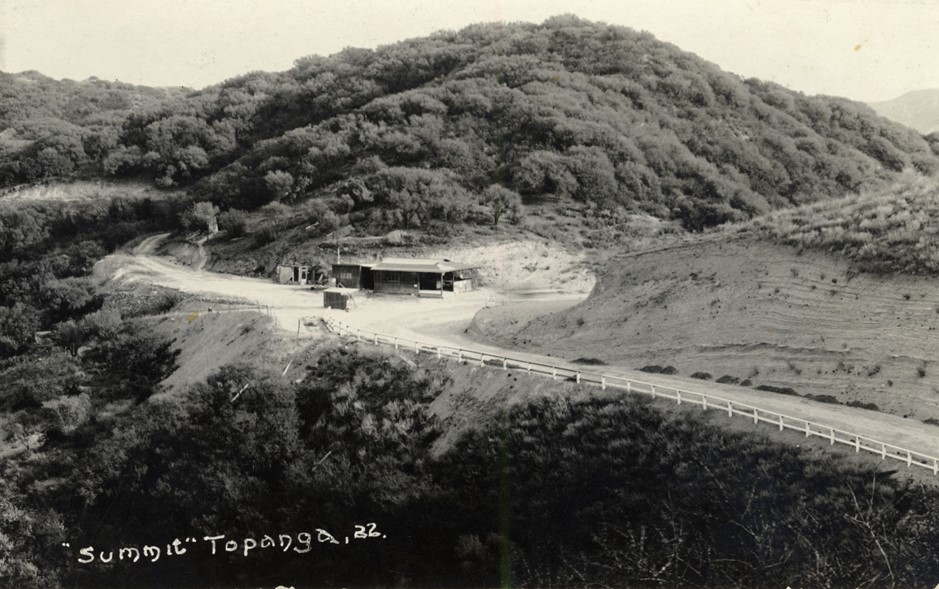
Photograph of Topanga Summit, made in 1922

Topanga Creek drains Topanga Canyon and is the third-largest watershed entering the Santa Monica Bay. The creek is one of the area's few remaining undammed waterways, and is a spawning ground for steelhead trout. The area averages about 22 inches (560 mm) of rain annually. Topanga Beach lies on the coast at the outlet of Topanga Creek. Topanga Canyon Boulevard, State Route 27, is the principal thoroughfare, connecting the Ventura Freeway (US 101) to the north with Pacific Coast Highway (SR 1) on the south. The southern portion of the boulevard largely follows Topanga Creek. North of the Old Topanga Canyon Road intersection, the boulevard traverses the Santa Monica Mountains.

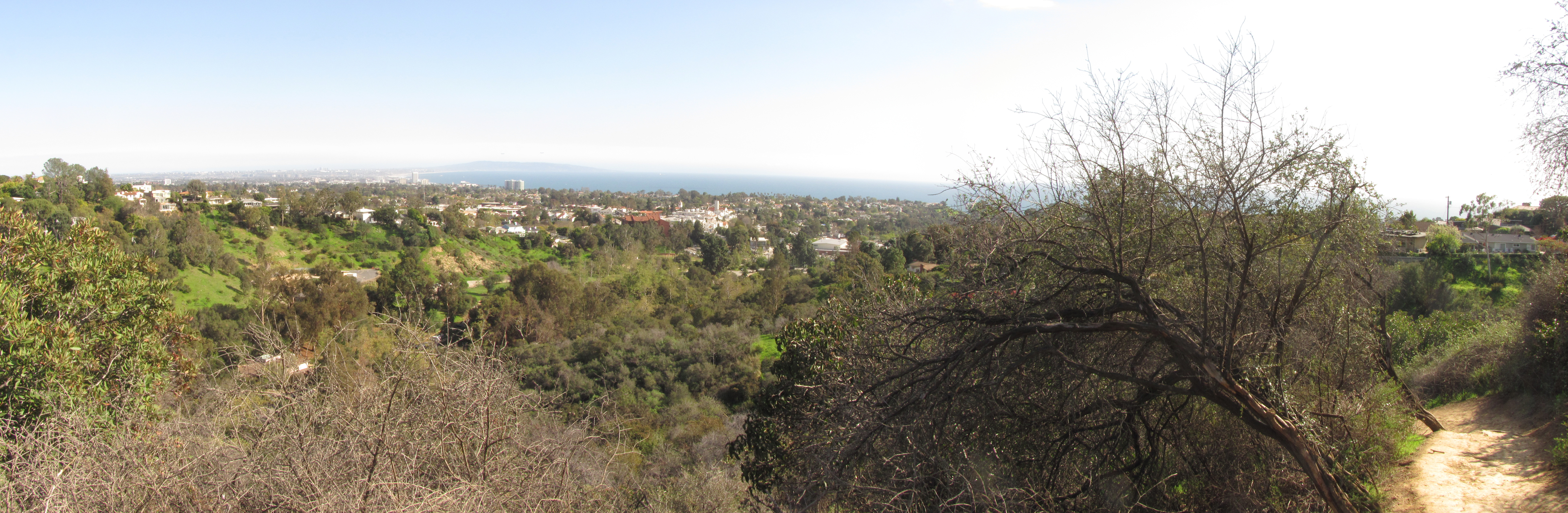
Panorama from Viewpoint Trail in Topanga State Park

Topanga Canyon contains lands of Topanga State Park, the largest park in the Santa Monica Mountains and one of the world's largest open space preserves surrounded by a city, as well as the Santa Monica Mountains Conservancy. It is part of the Santa Monica Mountains National Recreation Area. It primarily represents a California coastal sage and chaparral ecoregion, with large areas of the California oak woodland plant community and a variety of California native plants.

=== Climate ===
This region experiences warm (but not hot) and dry summers, with no average monthly temperatures above 71.6 °F (22.0 °C). According to the Köppen climate classification system, Topanga has a warm-summer Mediterranean climate, abbreviated "Csb" on climate maps.

== Demographics ==
Historical population
Census	Pop.	Note	%±
2010	8,289		—
2020	8,560		3.3%
U.S. Decennial Census; 1860–1870 1880–1890; 1900 1910 1920; 1930 1940 1950; 1960 1970 1980; 1990 2000 2010; 2020

Topanga first appeared as a census designated place (CDP) in the 2010 U.S. census.

=== Racial and ethnic composition ===
Topanga CDP, California – Racial and ethnic composition Note: the US Census treats Hispanic/Latino as an ethnic category. This table excludes Latinos from the racial categories and assigns them to a separate category. Hispanics/Latinos may be of any race.
Race / Ethnicity (NH = Non-Hispanic)	Pop 2010	Pop 2020	% 2010	% 2020
White alone (NH)	7,002	6,656	84.47%	77.76%
Black or African American alone (NH)	112	112	1.35%	1.31%
Native American or Alaska Native alone (NH)	22	24	0.27%	0.28%
Asian alone (NH)	343	411	4.14%	4.80%
Native Hawaiian or Pacific Islander alone (NH)	1	6	0.01%	0.07%
Other race alone (NH)	24	69	0.29%	0.81%
Mixed race or Multiracial (NH)	251	523	3.03%	6.11%
Hispanic or Latino (any race)	534	759	6.44%	8.87%
Total	8,289	8,560	100.00%	100.00%

=== 2020 census ===
As of the 2020 census, Topanga had a population of 8,560. The population density was 447.5 inhabitants per square mile (172.8/km^{2}). The census reported that 99.7% of the population lived in households, 0.3% lived in non-institutionalized group quarters, and no one was institutionalized. 73.8% of residents lived in urban areas, while 26.2% lived in rural areas.

There were 3,474 households, out of which 26.5% included children under the age of 18, 50.3% were married-couple households, 7.4% were cohabiting couple households, 24.6% had a female householder with no partner present, and 17.7% had a male householder with no partner present. 25.4% of households were one person, and 10.7% were one person aged 65 or older. The average household size was 2.46. There were 2,314 families (66.6% of all households).

The age distribution was 18.2% under the age of 18, 5.4% aged 18 to 24, 22.1% aged 25 to 44, 33.1% aged 45 to 64, and 21.1% who were 65 years of age or older. The median age was 47.9 years. For every 100 females, there were 94.5 males, and for every 100 females age 18 and over, there were 94.1 males age 18 and over.

There were 3,758 housing units at an average density of 196.5 units per square mile (75.9 units/km^{2}). Of all housing units, 7.6% were vacant. Of occupied units, 76.0% were owner-occupied and 24.0% were occupied by renters. The homeowner vacancy rate was 1.1% and the rental vacancy rate was 5.4%.

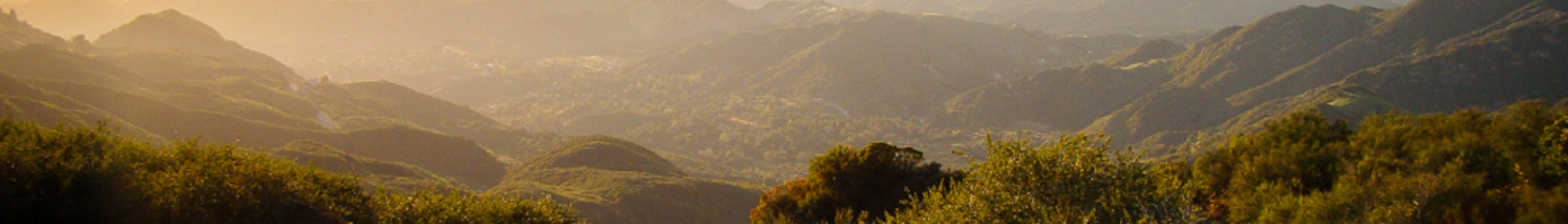
Topanga, California, as viewed from the Topanga Overlook

== Lower Topanga Canyon ==
From the 1920s through the early 2000s, lower Topanga Canyon (where the canyon meets Pacific Coast Highway and Topanga State Beach) was owned by the Los Angeles Athletic Club, a wealthy private club in downtown Los Angeles. The 1,659-acre (6.71 km^{2}) parcel was rented out to various businesses and residents for decades at relatively low rents, considering that it borders Malibu. Lower Topanga became unique as one of the last outposts of the classic Topanga Canyon bohemian hippie lifestyle.

The Chumash people considered Lower Topanga a sacred, economic, and cultural meeting place for tribes all along the coast. One of the main neighborhoods, the "Rodeo Grounds", takes its name from a rodeo arena that existed there on a Mexican ranch in the 1800s.

In the early 1900s, Lower Topanga was a Japanese fishing village. William Randolph Hearst owned the property for a time and turned it into a weekend getaway spot with beach shacks for his and Marion Davies's guests.

In the '60s, a lively community of artists and surfers sprang up in Lower Topanga. They maintained their houses without assistance, sometimes digging them out of the mud after floods or setting backfires to prevent a spreading wildfire from burning down the neighborhood. The roads remained unpaved.

In 2001, Lower Topanga was sold to California State Parks. The Lower Topanga community occupied less than 2% of the total purchased land. State Parks relocated residents and bulldozed their houses. (State Parks had already evicted residents who lived directly on Topanga Beach in the late '70s).

A group of 10 Lower Topanga poets calling themselves the "Idlers of the Bamboo Grove" published a book of the same name in 2002, celebrating their community and lamenting the prospect of having to leave. Their publisher, Brass Tacks Press, continued publishing works about Lower Topanga, as well as maintaining an online Lower Topanga Photo Archive.

Even though Lower Topanga residents were given money to leave, some fought bitterly against their relocation in court. The last holdouts were forced off the land in March 2006. TreePeople and Mountains Restoration Trust are working to restore the area to its condition before development.

== Culture ==
Gaining modern recognition as a bohemian enclave in the 1960s, attracting artists, musicians, filmmakers, and others, it has since become a luxury residential location with "an increasingly high bar for financial entry." Despite socioeconomic shifts, the community has continued to organize many events dedicated to the arts, such as the annual Topanga Film Festival hosted by the Topanga Film Institute, or to social issues, like with Topanga Earth Day. In 1979 The New York Times described "Topanga style" as "a cross between the Old West and a kibbutz." Much later in 2018, the Los Angeles Times described the initial community culture created by '60s migration as one "reflecting their values of peace, equality and individualism." An unofficial motto for the town is has been “Don’t change Topanga, let Topanga change you”.

A famous venue in the canyon was the Elysium Institute, also known as Elysium Fields, a nudist club started by Ed Lange in 1967. After surviving extended battles with county officials, Elysium closed in 2001 and the 9-acre (3.6 ha) property was sold in 2002 by Lange's heirs.

A creekside restaurant called Inn of the Seventh Ray opened in 1973 and has been reputed as a "romantic destination".

=== Land and environment ===
As wildfires within the immediate vicinity have become more frequent due to higher temperatures and dryer climates, the community culture had been shaped by preparedness and community organizing. Local fairs have been held dedicated to fire safety awareness. In 2022 the National Fire Protection Association designated Topanga as a “Firewise community" based on the actions community members took to make their homes wildfire resistant.

Residents have reportedly opposed land development in the region since the late 1970s, preferring to maintain the current landscape. In 2015 "Tank Site" was added to the National Register of Historic Places for its significance to the area's history.

=== Artistry ===
The Topanga Community House began hosting a "strawberry festival" in the 1960s that eventually became the annual "Topanga Days" Memorial Day weekend music fair. Since the 1970s a parade is held on Memorial Day itself. Starting in 2010, another major music festival has been Reggae on the Mountain, inspired by Reggae on the River and held as a fundraiser for the Topanga Community Club. Though founded in Topanga, it has since been held in various cities across Southern California.

Since its founding in 1973, the Geer family has continued to operate the Will Geer Theatricum Botanicum. It has grown into an Equity theater, and occupies a natural outdoor amphitheater. It features Shakespearean plays, modern classics, original productions, and concerts. It has seen an influx of visitors from beyond Topanga since the lifting of Covid lockdowns.

== Government and infrastructure ==
Being in the Santa Monica Mountains, Topanga falls under Los Angeles County's "Santa Monica Mountains North Area Plan" for biological protection. The most recently updated version went into effect June 2021, and raised concerns over Topanga's outdated "subdivisions" which had been "recorded prior to 1929" when regulations standardizing the process went into effect.

Topanga falls under the Consolidated Fire Protection District (CFPD), which staffs Los Angeles County Fire Department Station No. 69 in the town as a part of Battalion 5. During the 1960s and '70s, "problematic firefighters" were placed here under the supervision of James O. Page. Fire roads are maintained by the women prisoners of Malibu Conservation Camp 13 working as firefighters, cooks, and maintenance personnel.

The County of Los Angeles Public Library operates the Topanga Library, at 122 N Topanga Canyon Blvd.

The Los Angeles County Sheriff's Department (LASD) operates the Malibu/Lost Hills Station in Calabasas, serving Topanga.

The United States Postal Service Topanga Post Office is at 101 S Topanga Canyon Blvd.

The California Highway Patrol, West Valley Area, handles the traffic on the State Route and in the unincorporated areas.

The Topanga Coalition for Emergency Preparedness (T-CEP) operates an Emergency Operations Center (EOC) near the Topanga Town Center.

== Education ==
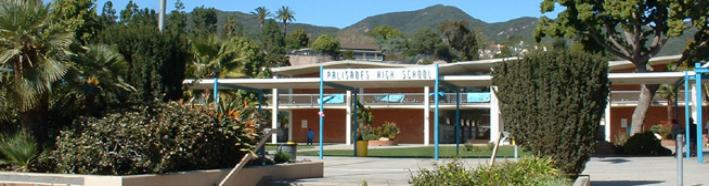
Palisades Charter High School

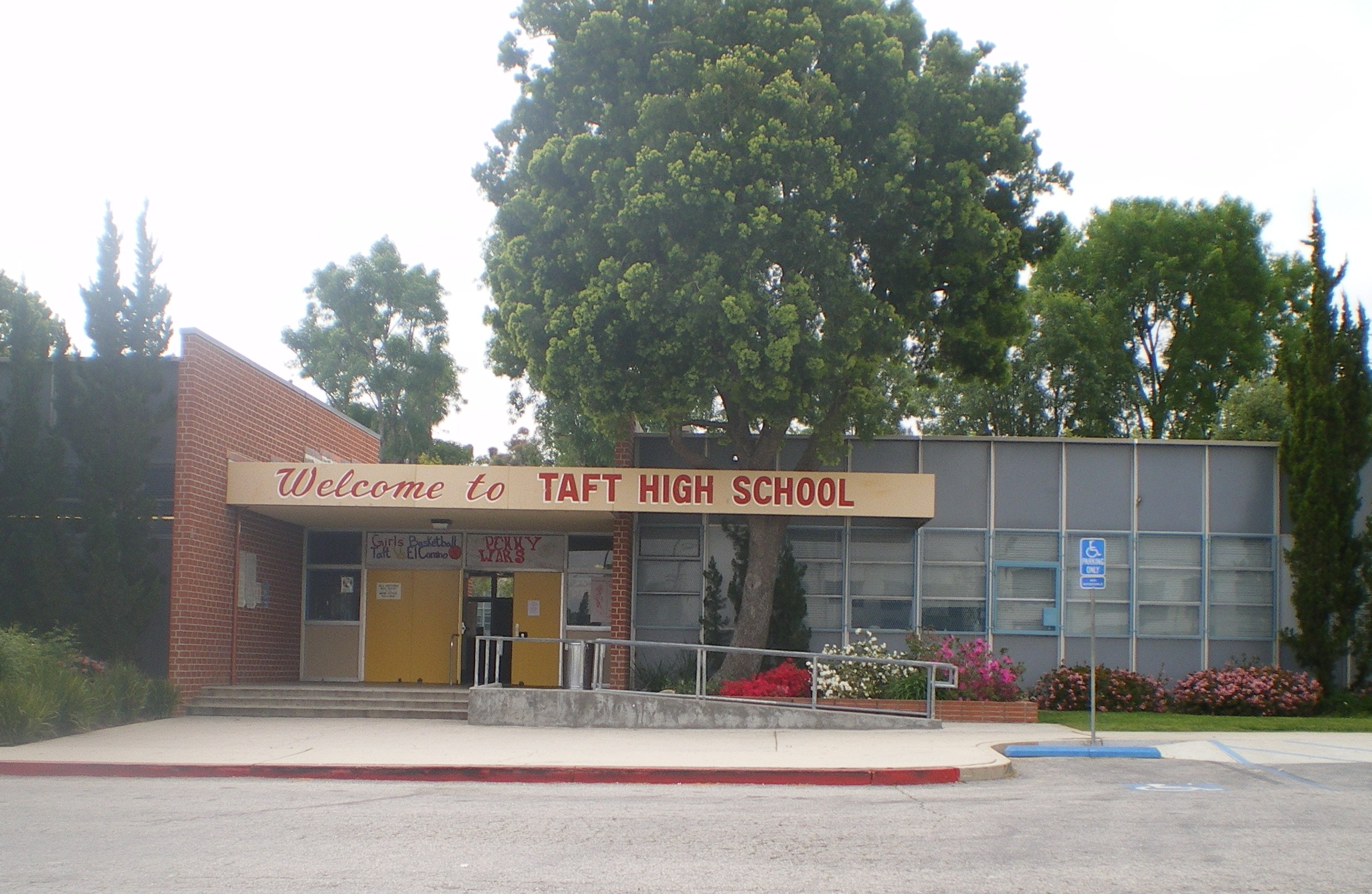
William Howard Taft High School

Most Topanga residents are zoned to schools in the Los Angeles Unified School District. LAUSD schools with attendance boundaries including most of Topanga include:

- Topanga Elementary School
  - A 1998 Los Angeles Magazine article reported that a teacher said that the fact that many of the students' parents are creative professionals contributes to the school's high test scores. As of 1998 many parents conduct music and art lessons at the school, as Topanga itself is an artists' colony.
- A choice between Revere Charter Middle School or Woodland Hills Academy (formerly Parkman Middle School)
- A choice between Palisades Charter High School and Taft High School

The area is in Board District 4. As of 2025, Nick Melvoin represents the district.

Some portions are in the Santa Monica-Malibu Unified School District (SMMUSD), zoned to Webster Elementary School and Malibu High School. Some are in the Las Virgenes Unified School District.

Private schools:

- Manzanita School at Big Rock Ranch
- Viewpoint School in Calabasas

The County of Los Angeles Public Library operates the Topanga Library.

== See also ==
- Topanga Canyon Boulevard
- List of people from Topanga, California
- Populated places in the Santa Monica Mountains
