= Topanga Ranch Motel =

Motel in California, US (open 1929–2004)

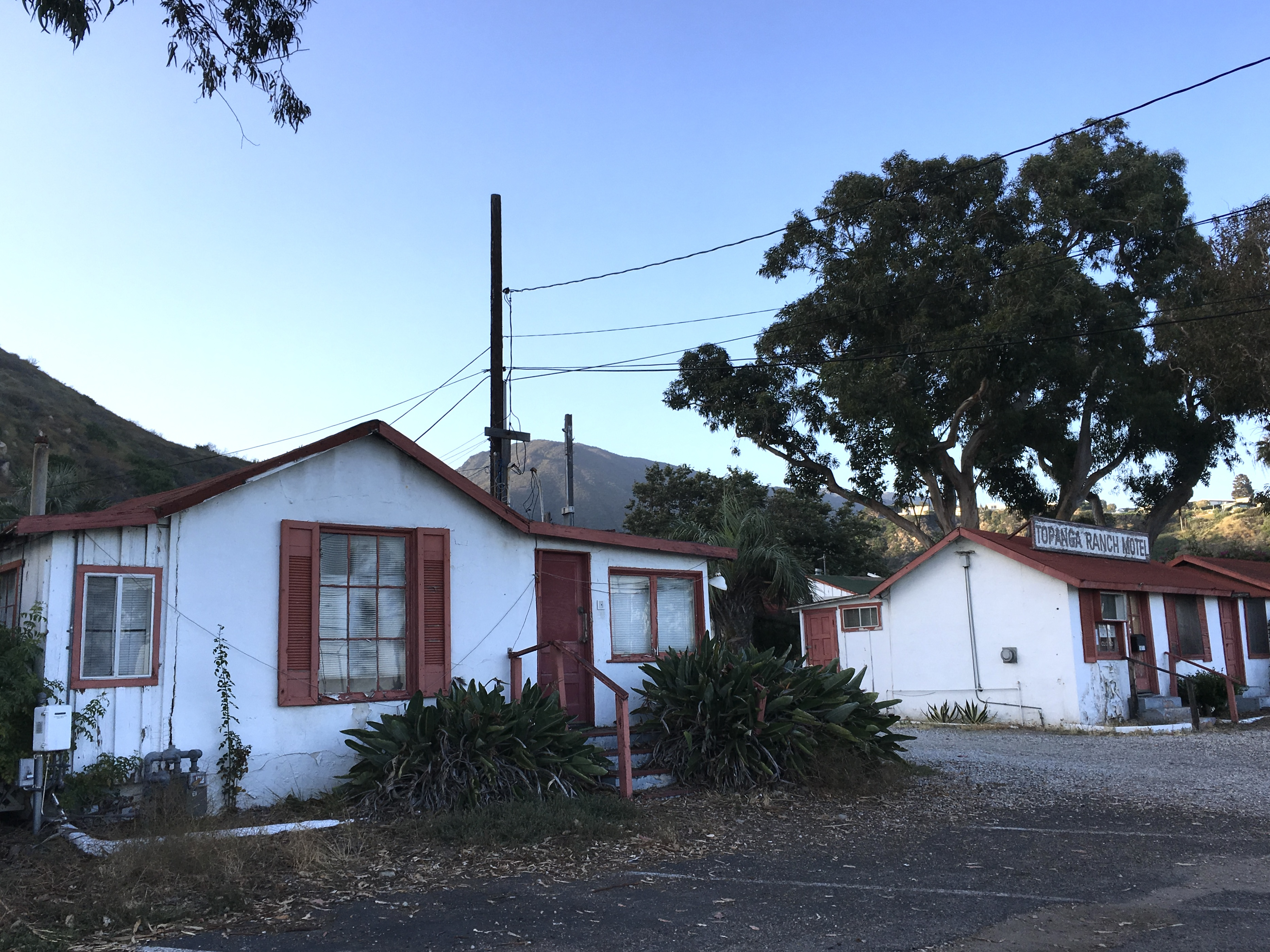
- Motel on Topanga Canyon
- Interactive map of the Topanga Ranch Motel area

General information
- Architectural style: Bungalow
- Location: 18711 Pacific Coast Highway, Malibu, California, U.S.
- Coordinates: 34.039853°N 118.582442°W
- Opened: 1929
- Closed: 2004
- Demolished: 2025 (Palisades Fire)
- Owner: William Randolph Hearst; California State Parks

Topanga Ranch Motel was a historic seaside motel in Topanga State Park in Los Angeles County, California. The motel was built in 1929 by William Randolph Hearst. On January 8, 2025, it was destroyed by the Palisades Fire.

== History ==
The motel began in 1919 as a campground, called Cooper's Camp, run by Miller Cooper. Cabins were added in 1920 to house a summer camp for classical musicians. Cooper gave up the business in 1926 and, in 1928, it was renamed the Topanga Beach Auto Court.

When a highway running through the camp was reconstructed in 1933, the motel was moved dozens of feet inland. The bungalow-style motel was built in 1929 by publishing mogel William Randolph Hearst. The 30-room motel originally housed construction workers employed to build the Pacific Coast Highway (known as the Roosevelt Highway until 1941).

In the 1980s, a plan was introduced to demolish the motel and replace it with up to eight hundred condominiums and apartments, but the plan was defeated. California State Parks acquired the site in 2001 but the motel closed in 2004.

On January 8, 2025, the Palisades Fire destroyed the Topanga Ranch Motel, as well as other areas of the park. Prior to its destruction in the fire, it was one of the last surviving examples of an early bungalow-style motel in California and had been determined eligible for the National Register of Historic Places.
