= Thousand Oaks, California =

Thousand Oaks
- City
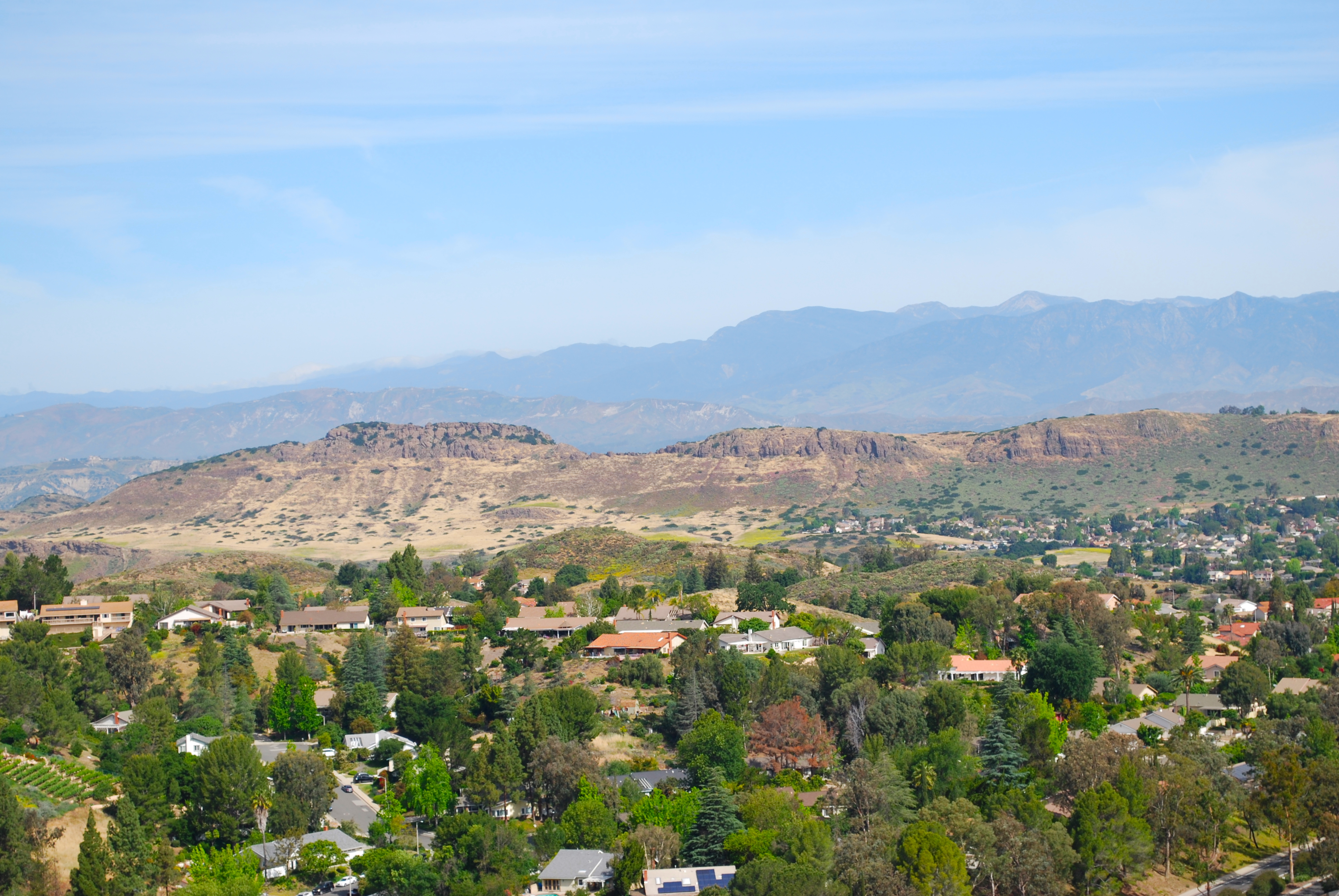
- Mount Clef Ridge as seen from Tarantula Hill, Thousand Oaks

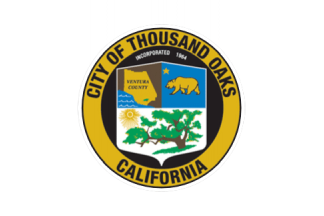
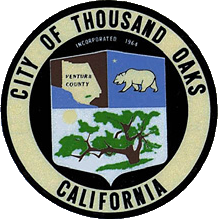
- Flag Seal
- Interactive map of Thousand Oaks
- Location in California Location in the United States
- Coordinates: 34°11′22″N 118°52′30″W
- Country: United States
- U.S. state: California
- County: Ventura County, California
- Region: Conejo Valley
- Incorporated: October 7, 1964

Government
  - Type: Council/Manager
  - Mayor: Mikey Taylor
  - Mayor Pro Tem: Bob Engler
  - City Council members: Al Adam; Connie Tie Gutierrez; David Newman
  - City manager: Drew Powers

Area
  - City: 55.40 sq mi (143.49 km^{2})
  - Land: 55.26 sq mi (143.11 km^{2})
  - Water: 0.15 sq mi (0.38 km^{2}) 0.26%
- Elevation: 890 ft (270 m)

Population (2020 United States census)
  - City: 126,966
  - Rank: 2nd in Ventura County; 49th in California
  - Density: 2,297.8/sq mi (887.19/km^{2})
  - Urban (Thousand Oaks, CA): 213,986 (US: 181st)
  - Urban density: 2,668.3/sq mi (1,030.2/km^{2})
  - Metro (Oxnard–Thousand Oaks–Ventura, CA): 843,843 (US: 71st)
- Time zone: UTC−8 (Pacific Time Zone)
  - Summer (DST): UTC−7 (PDT)
- ZIP Codes: 91320, 91359–91362
- Area codes: 805/820
- FIPS code: 06-78582
- GNIS feature IDs: 1661567, 2412065
- Website: toaks.gov

Thousand Oaks is the second-largest city in Ventura County, California, United States, located in the northwestern part of Greater Los Angeles. Approximately 15 miles (24 km) from the city of Los Angeles and 40 miles (64 km) from Downtown Los Angeles, it is named after the many oak trees present in the area.

The city forms the central populated core of the Conejo Valley. Thousand Oaks was incorporated in 1964 and has since expanded to the west and east. Two-thirds of the master-planned community surrounding Westlake and most of Newbury Park were annexed by the city during the late 1960s and 1970s. The Los Angeles County–Ventura County line forms the city's eastern border with the city of Westlake Village. The population was 126,966 at the 2020 census, up from 126,683 at the 2010 census.

== History ==
=== Etymology ===
One of the earliest names used for the area was Conejo Mountain Valley, as used by the founder of Newbury Park, Egbert Starr Newbury, in the 1870s. During the 1920s, today's Thousand Oaks was home to 100 residents. In the 1920s, the residents held a naming competition where the 14-year-old Bobby Harrington's name suggestion won: Thousand Oaks. The valley is characterized by its tens of thousands of oak trees (50,000–60,000 in 2012).

When the city was incorporated in 1964, the Janss Corporation suggested the name Conejo City (City of Conejo). A petition was signed by enough residents to put Thousand Oaks on the ballot. An overwhelming majority—87%—of the city's 19,000 residents voted for the name Thousand Oaks during the September 29, 1964, election.

=== Pre-colonial period ===
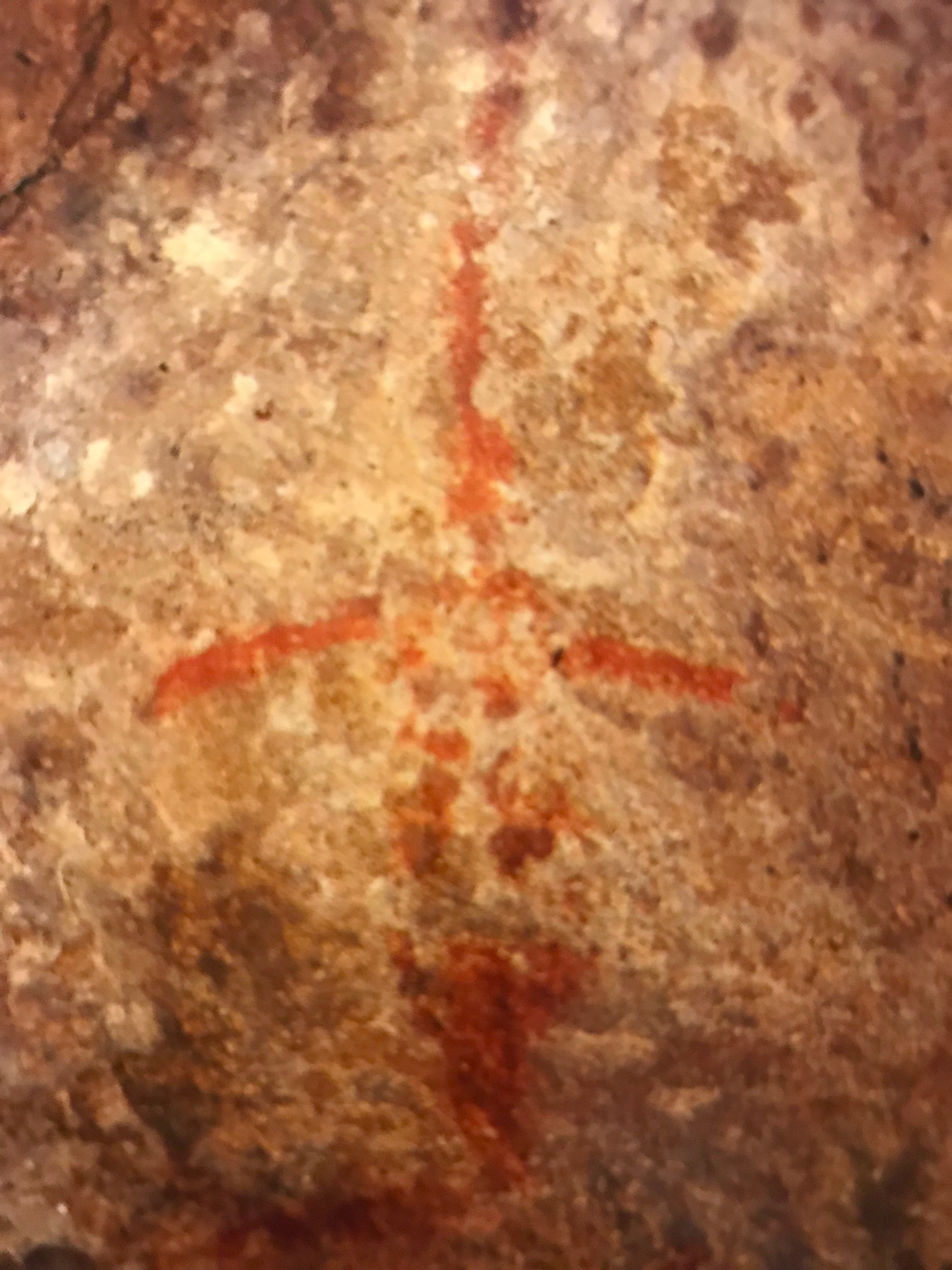
2,000-year-old pictograph in Thousand Oaks

Chumash people were the first to inhabit the area, settling there over 10,000 years ago. It was home to two major villages: Sap'wi ("House of the Deer") and Satwiwa ("The Bluffs"). Sap'wi is now by the Chumash Interpretive Center which is home to multiple 2,000-year-old pictographs. Satwiwa is the home of the Native American Indian Culture Center which sits at the foothills of Mount Boney in Newbury Park, a sacred mountain to the Chumash.

A smaller village, Yitimasɨh, was located where Wildwood Elementary School sits today. The area surrounding Wildwood Regional Park has been inhabited by the Chumash for thousands of years. Some of the artifacts discovered in Wildwood include stone tools, shell beads and arrowheads. Another small Chumash settlement, known as Šihaw (Ven-632i), was located where Lang Ranch sits today. A cave containing several swordfish and cupules pictographs is located here. Two other villages were located by today's Ventu Park Road in Newbury Park. These were populated 2,000 years ago and had a population of 100–200 in each village. Other villages included Lalimanuc (Lalimanux) and Kayɨwɨš (Kayiwish) by Conejo Grade.

The Chumash also had several summer encampments, including one located where Thousand Oaks Civic Arts Plaza currently stands, known as Ipuc (Ven-654). Another summer encampment was located at the current location of Los Robles Hospital.

Each village was ruled by a chief or several chieftains, who often traveled between villages to discuss matters of common interest. A council of elders directed village life and organized events. Most villages had a cemetery, gaming field, a sweat house, and a place for ceremonies. Locally discovered tribal artifacts are at display at Satwiwa Native American Indian Culture Center and the Chumash Indian Museum.

The region's recorded history dates to 1542, when Spanish explorer Juan Rodriguez Cabrillo landed at Point Mugu and claimed the land for Spain. The Battle of Triunfo, which took place by Triunfo Creek, was waged over land between native Chumash and the Spanish newcomers.

=== 19th century ===
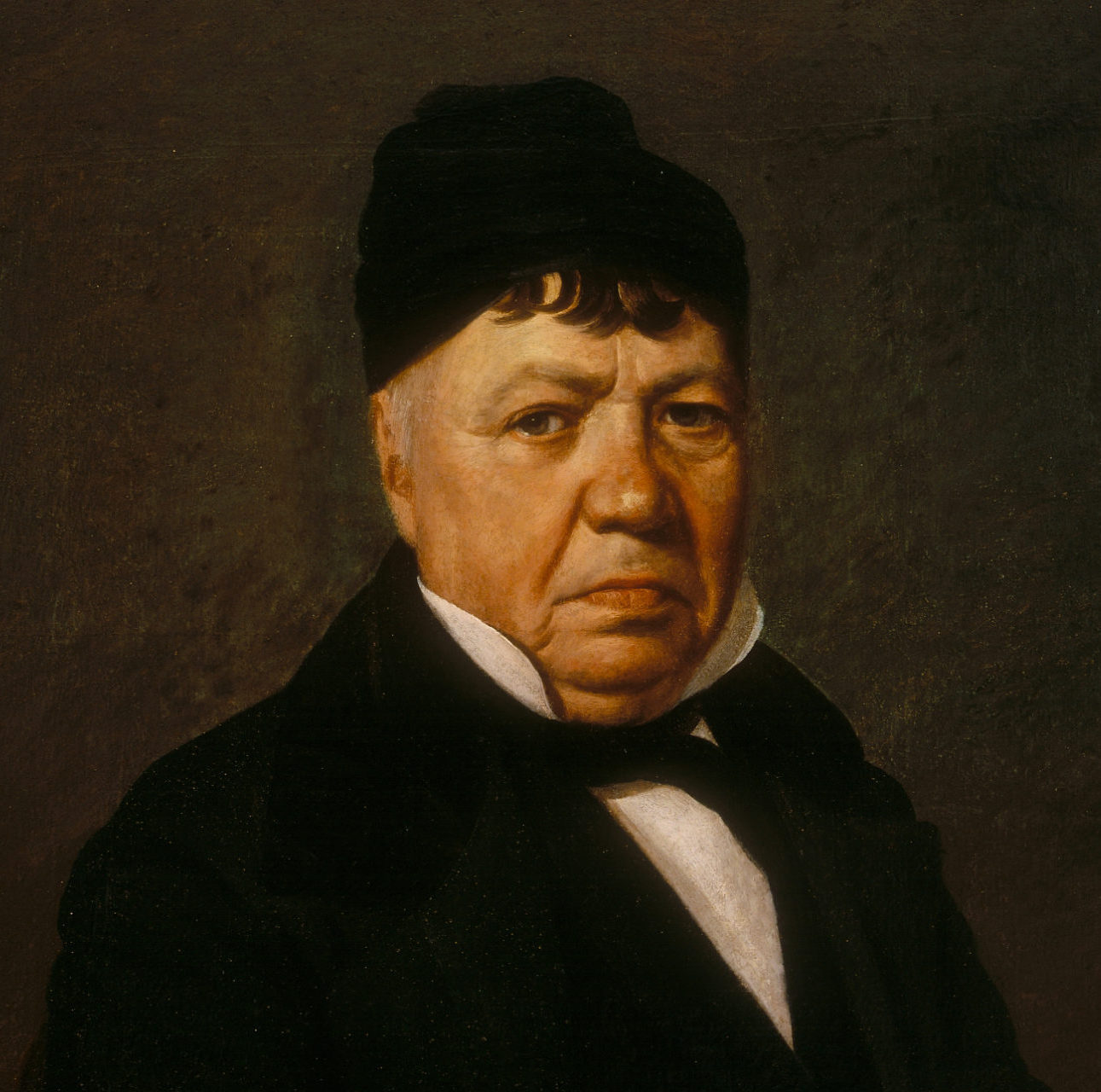
Thousand Oaks was part of Rancho El Conejo, owned by Don José de la Guerra y Noriega, founder of the prominent Guerra family of California.

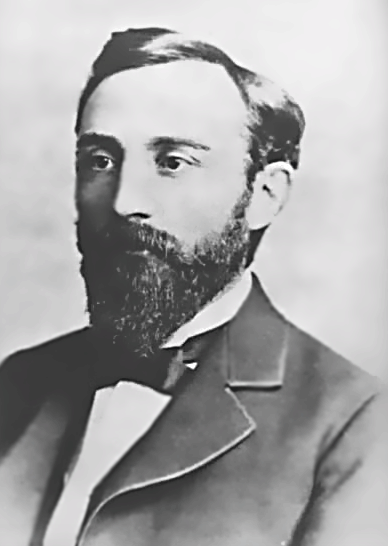
E.S. Newbury was one of the first to buy former Rancho El Conejo land.

From 1804 to 1848, Thousand Oaks was part of Alta California, which originally was a Spanish polity in North America. It was the Spaniards who first named it Conejo Valley, or Valley of Rabbits. The Spaniards and indigenous Chumash clashed numerous times in disputes over land. Conejo Valley was given the name El Rancho Conejo in 1803. This year, Jose Polanco and Ignacio Rodriguez were granted El Rancho Conejo by Governor José Joaquín de Arrillaga of Alta California. The land contained 48,671.56 acres. El Conejo was just one of two land grants in what became Ventura County, the other being Rancho Simi.

As a result of the Mexican War of Independence in 1822, Alta California became a Mexican territory. In 1822, Captain José de la Guerra y Noriega filed Conejo Valley as part of the Mexican land grant. It remained a part of Mexico until the short-lived California Republic was established in 1846. It became a part of the U.S. after California gained statehood in 1850. The valley was now known as Rancho El Conejo. The ranch period began when the de la Guerra family sold thousands of acres through the 1860s and early 1870s.

Two men owned most of Conejo Valley in the 1870s: John Edwards, who came from Wales in 1849, and Howard Mills, who came from Minnesota in 1870. While Edwards owned most of present-day Thousand Oaks and Newbury Park, Mills owned most of Westlake Village and Hidden Valley. Edwards' home was located on an acre of land where The Oaks Mall currently is located, while Mills built his home where Westlake Lake sits today. The third person to buy former Rancho El Conejo land was Egbert Starr Newbury. He bought 2,259 acres of land here in 1874, land which stretched from Old Town Thousand Oaks and into today's Newbury Park. He later established the valley's first post office in 1875: Newbury Park Post Office. When the Conejo Valley School District was established in March 1877, there were 126 residents living in Conejo Valley.

In the late 19th century, Newbury Park was on the stagecoach route between Los Angeles and Santa Barbara. The Stagecoach Inn (Grand Union Hotel) was built in 1876, and is now a California Historical Landmark and museum.

=== Norwegian Colony ===
Thousand Oaks was home to a Norwegian community in the late 1890s and early 1900s, known as Norwegian Colony. Norwegian settlers were among the first to settle in Conejo Valley. The Norwegian Colony was located at today's intersection of Moorpark- and Olsen Roads, now home to California Lutheran University and surrounding areas. The Norwegian Colony constituted of over 650 acres and stretched from Mount Clef Ridge to Avenida de Los Arboles. The son of Norwegian immigrants donated his ranch to California Lutheran College in the 1950s. California Lutheran University is now home to the Scandinavian American Cultural and Historical Foundation and the Scandinavian Festival.

Many place names are named after Norwegian immigrants such as the Olsen and Pedersen families. The first Norwegians came from the village of Stranda by Storfjorden. Ole Anderson bought 199 acres here, while Lars Pederson owned 111 acres. Other Norwegian pioneers also included Ole Nilsen, George Hansen and Nils Olsen. A major contribution was the construction of the handmade Norwegian Grade in 1911, a mile-long road leading from Thousand Oaks to Santa Rosa Valley.

With no doctors or hospitals nearby, the Norwegian Colony was short-lived. The Olsen family lost seven of their ten children, while Ole Anderson, Lars Pederson, and George Hansen all died in 1901 due to a diphtheria epidemic.

=== 20th century ===
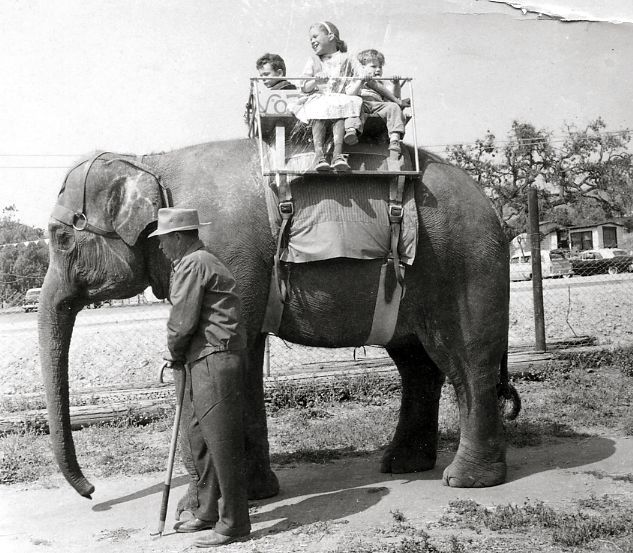
Jungleland USA was one of the first theme parks in California.

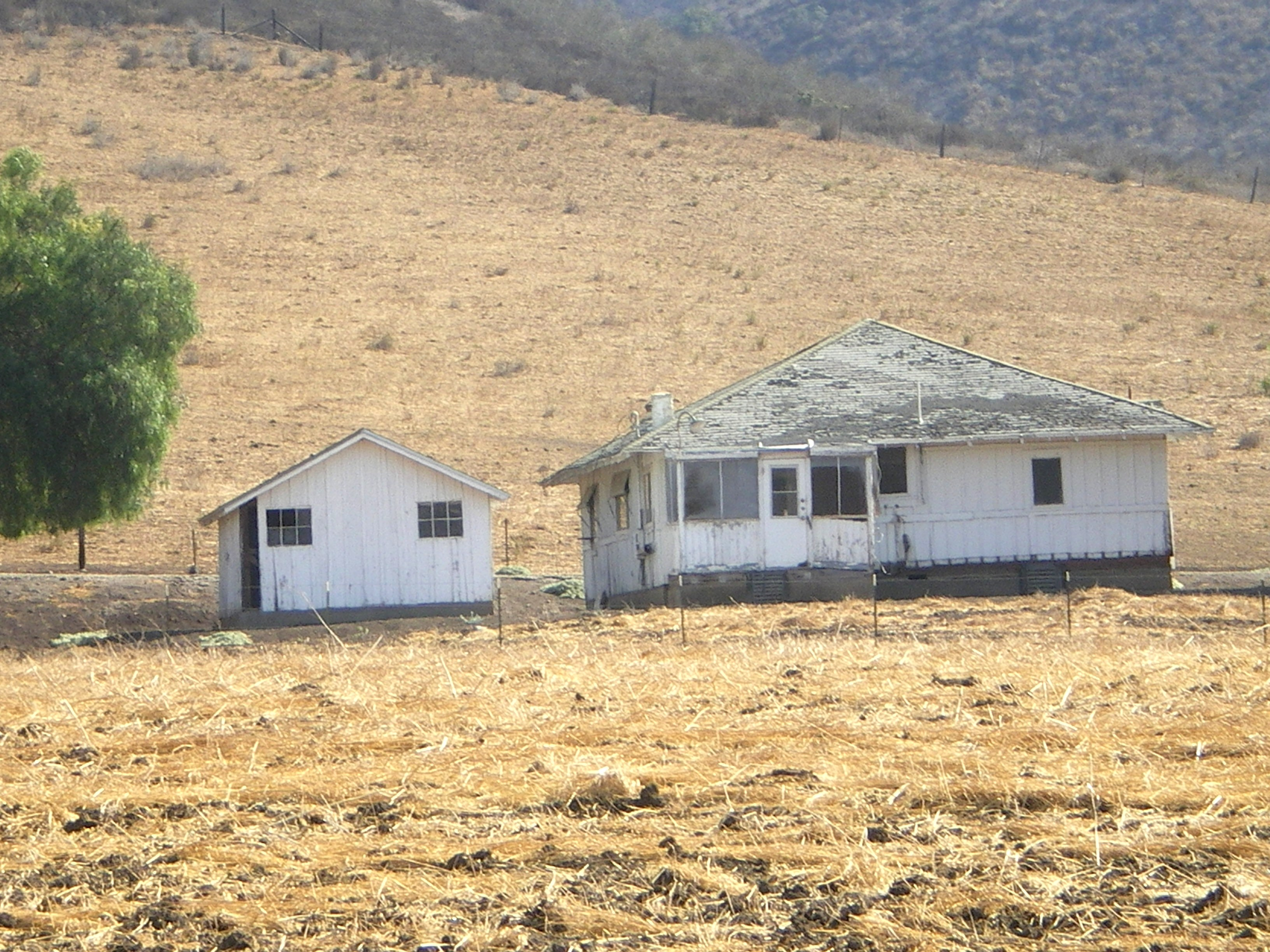
Various movies were filmed at Joel McCrea Ranch on N. Moorpark Road.

Newbury Park was a more established community than Thousand Oaks at the turn of the 20th century. A few lots existed early in the 1900s, wedged between Borchard land on the south and Friedrich land on the north. The Janss family, developers of Southern California subdivisions, purchased 10,000 acres (40 km^{2}) in the early 20th century. They eventually created plans for a "total community", and the name remains prominently featured in the city. Despite early aspirations, no large subdivisions were developed until the 1920s. The development was slow and hampered even more under the Great Depression of the 1930s. Besides agriculture, the movie industry became an important industry in the 1920s and 1930s.

Between 1950 and 1970, Conejo Valley experienced a population boom, and increased its population from 3,000 to 30,000 residents. From 3,500 residents in 1957, Thousand Oaks had over 103,000 inhabitants by 1989. While ranching and agriculture were the dominant industries until the 1950s, a number of new businesses appeared throughout the 1960s and 1970s. Particularly many high-tech firms moved to Thousand Oaks in the '60s and '70s. Packard Bell and Technology Instrument Company were two high-technology businesses that moved into the Newbury Park industrial park in the 1960s. Other companies that followed included Westinghouse Astroelectronics Laboratory, Semtech Corporation, Purolator Inc., and Westland Plastics.

Jungleland USA put Thousand Oaks on the map in the 1920s and helped attract Hollywood producers to the city. Hundreds of movies have been filmed in Thousand Oaks. Some of the first films to be made here were The Birth of a Nation (1915) at Jungleland USA and Roaring Ranch (1930) at the Stagecoach Inn. Thousand Oaks Boulevard was featured in the "Walls of Jericho" scenes in the film It Happened One Night (1934). A western village was erected at California Lutheran University for the filming of Welcome to Hard Times (1967), while Elvis Presley and John Wayne starred in several westerns made in Wildwood Regional Park. A nearby road, Flaming Star Avenue, is named after the film Flaming Star (1960) starring Elvis Presley, which was filmed here. Other movies filmed in the valley included Lassie Come Home (1943), To the Shores of Iwo Jima (1945) and The Dukes of Hazzard (1979–85). Dean Martin and Jerry Lewis visited Thousand Oaks for the filming of Hollywood or Bust (1956), which included a scene filmed on Live Oak Street.

Movie actor Joel McCrea, who had been advised by Will Rogers to buy land in the area, raised his family on a 3,000-acre (1,200 ha) ranch he had acquired in the early 1930s. Numerous celebrities later joined McCrea and relocated to the Conejo Valley, including Dean Martin, Bob Hope, Roy Rogers, Strother Martin, Virginia Mayo, Michael O'Shea, Ben Johnson, Slim Pickens, Ronald Colman, George Brent, Eve Arden, Alan Ladd, Richard Widmark, Charles Martin Smith, and Bing- and Kurt Russell.

While the city was home to 1,700 businesses in 1970, Thousand Oaks had 11,000 businesses in town by 1988.

The world's largest independent biotechnology company, Amgen, was established in Newbury Park in 1980.

==== Jungleland USA (zoo) ====
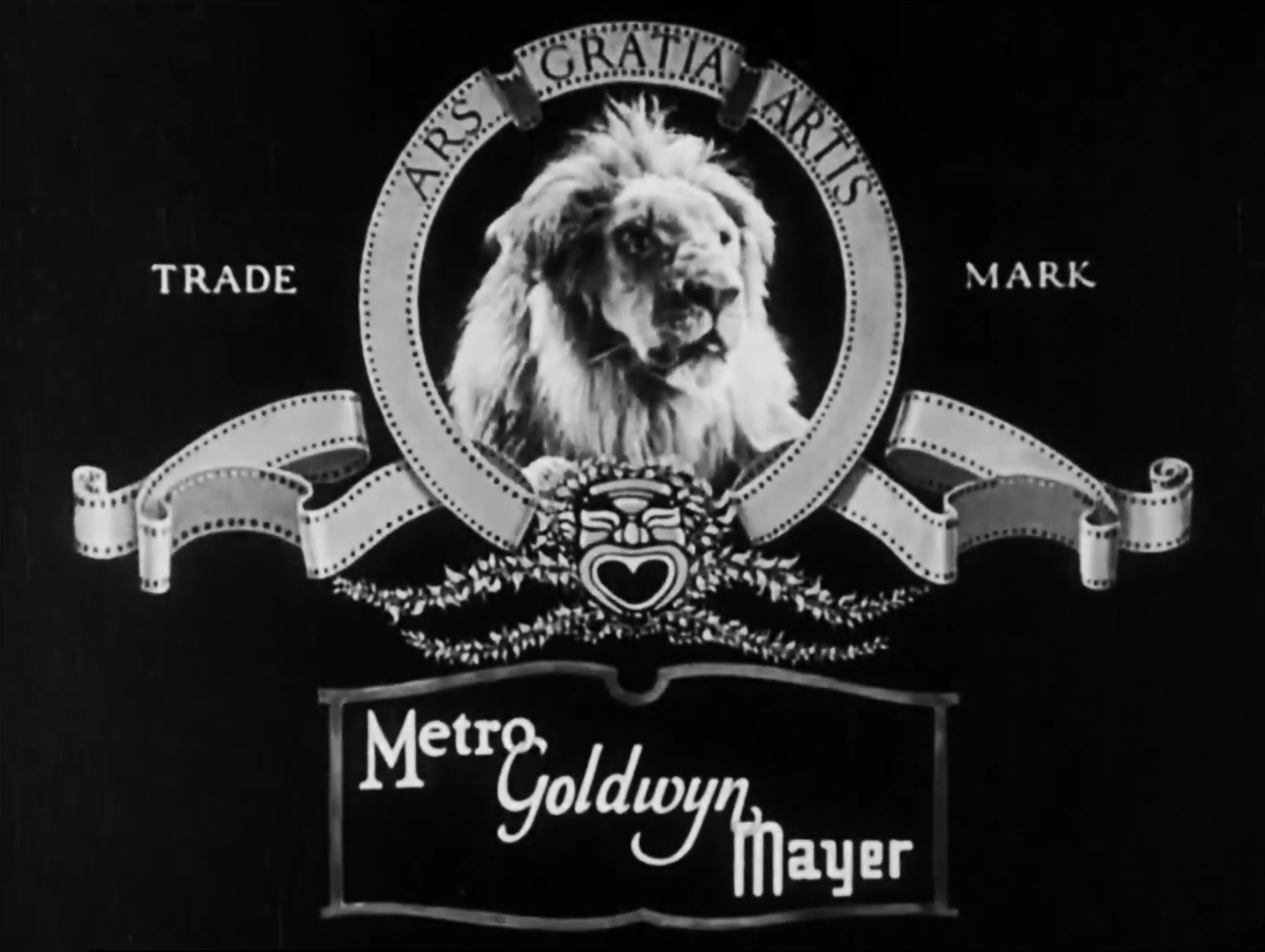
Slats, used from 1924 to 1928, was one of five MGM lions who resided at Jungleland USA.

Louis Goebel of New York bought five lots off Ventura Boulevard (today's Thousand Oaks Boulevard) in 1925. He worked for the Universal film studio, and decided to create his own film industry zoo after the closure of Universal Zoo in the mid-1920s. He established Goebel's Lion Farm in 1926, situated where Thousand Oaks Civic Arts Plaza is located today. Goebel began with five lions and seven malamute dogs, but he soon acquired new animals such as giraffes, camels, hippos, monkeys, tigers, gorillas, seals and other exotic animals.

It became home to several animals used for Leo the Lion MGM logo. There were held public animal shows, which drew thousands of spectators from throughout California. The animals from the park have been used in many movies and TV series, including many of the Tarzan films; The Adventures of Robin Hood (1938), which used the site as a location, and Doctor Doolittle (1967). Goebel himself camped by the filming site of Tarzan, the Ape Man (1932) by Lake Sherwood to watch his lions during filming.

It became one of Southern California's most popular tourists attractions in the 1940s and 1950s, when the 170-acre park offered shows, lion training, elephant rides, train rides, safari tram buses and more. The park changed name to Jungleland USA in 1956 after Disneyland was established. The park later went bankrupt in May 1969, due to competition from parks such as Disneyland, Knott's Berry Farm and Universal Studios. The park's 1,800 animals were sold at a public auction in October 1969.

==== Incorporation of the City ====
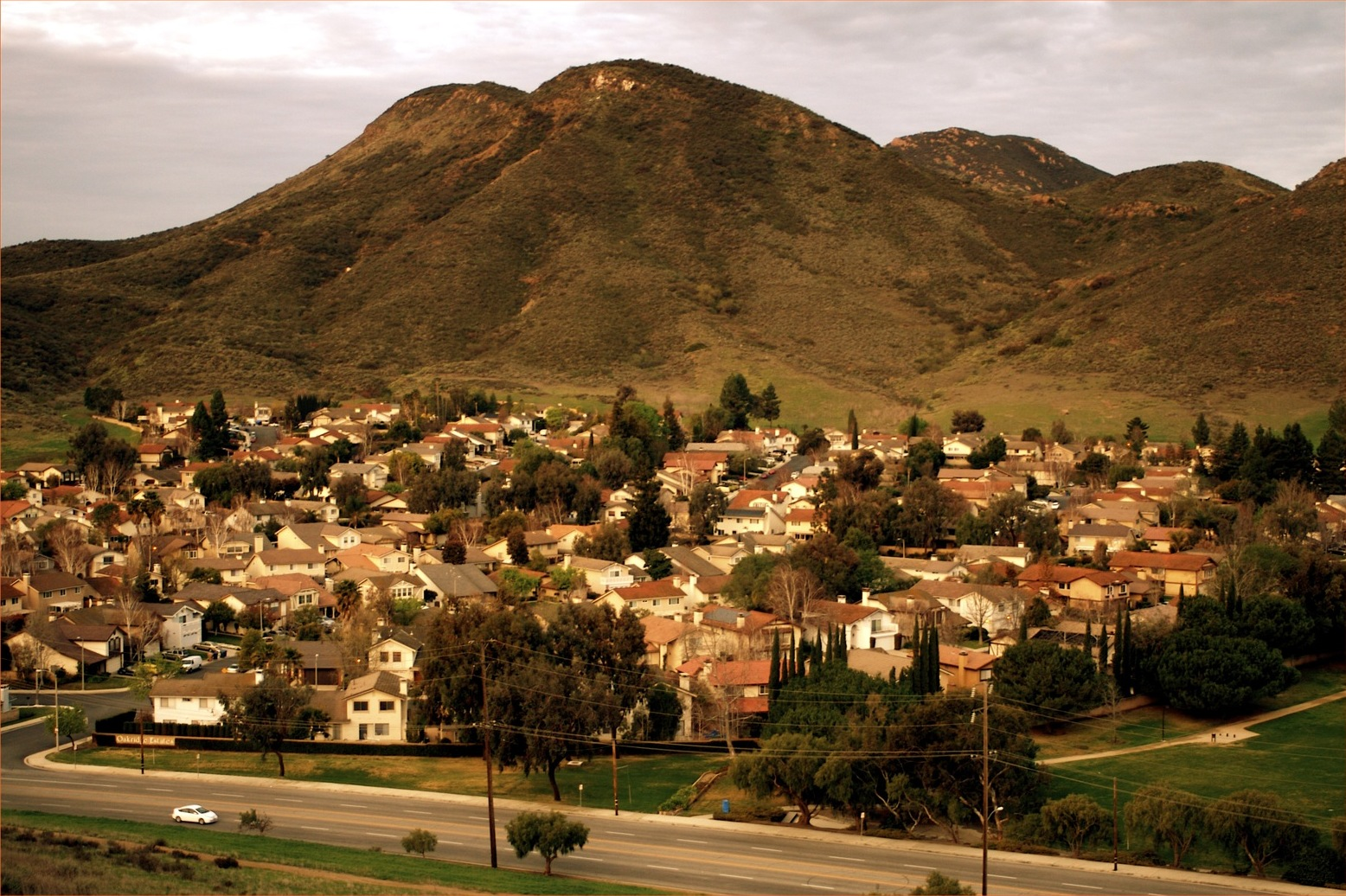
Casa Conejo is a county island in Newbury Park.

The City of Thousand Oaks was incorporated on October 7, 1964. On September 29, 1964, voters approved the incorporation and selected the name. The incorporation became official once the certificates of election were filed with the California Secretary of State, and the record of affidavit was filed with the Ventura County Clerk.

The results of the cityhood election was clear on September 24, 1964. 2,780 residents voted to set up a city, while 1,821 had voted no to incorporation. Certain areas however tried to set up its own municipality. An attempt at a cityhood election in Newbury Park failed in 1963, as Talley Corporation and Janss Rancho Conejo Industrial Park refused to join the efforts. Reba Hays Jeffries, a local opponent of cityhood, told interviewers why she thought the cityhood election failed: Cityhood backers had to collect signatures from owners who represented 29% of the land that was to be incorporated. As the efforts collected 29% of registered voters, rather than owners of 29% of the land, the measure never came on the ballot. Most of the previously unincorporated Newbury Park lands were annexed into Thousand Oaks through the late 1960s and throughout the 1970s, forming the Newbury Park neighborhood within the city. Casa Conejo and Ventu Park are the only parts of Newbury Park left, which are not parts of Thousand Oaks. Lynn Ranch also decided to remain outside city limits.

Two-thirds of the master planned community of Westlake was annexed by Thousand Oaks in two portions – in 1968 and 1972. The nearby neighborhood of North Ranch remained an unincorporated area until January 1973, when Thousand Oaks approved the annexation of North Ranch. North Ranch borders Oak Park, an unincorporated area where voters have chosen not to be annexed into Thousand Oaks. Dos Vientos is a 2,350-unit housing development which was approved by the council in April 1988. The master-planned community was the largest residential project ever in Newbury Park.

=== Modern history ===
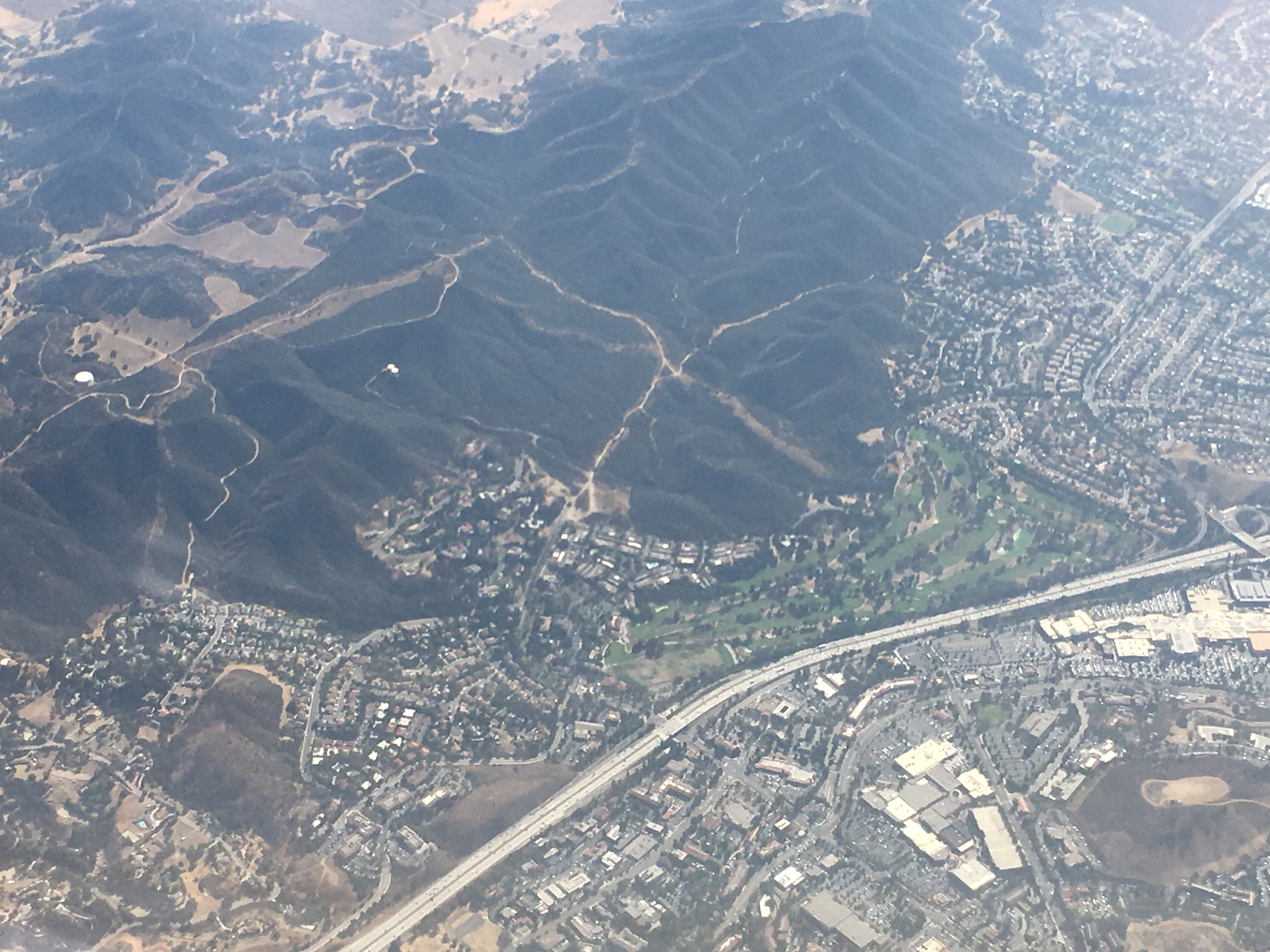
Aerial view of Thousand Oaks, southward view

The city of Thousand Oaks encourages mixed-use retail and housing development along the downtown portion of Thousand Oaks Boulevard. The city is built within the confines of the Conejo Valley. It has adopted a smart growth urban planning strategy because there is no more room for the sprawling suburban growth the city is known for.

Increased development in Moorpark and Simi Valley in the late 1990s and early 2000s caused the Moorpark Freeway (Highway 23) to become heavily congested during both morning and afternoon rush hours. A major widening project began in 2008.

On March 30, 2016, California Lutheran University and the NFL Rams team reached an agreement that allowed the team to have regular season training operations at CLU's campus in Thousand Oaks for the next two years. The Rams paid for two practice fields, paved parking, and modular buildings constructed on the northwestern corner of the campus.

On November 7, 2018, a lone gunman killed 12 people in a mass shooting at the Borderline Bar and Grill. Days later, the Woolsey Fire threatened the community, burning homes across Ventura and Los Angeles Counties. The fire continued most of November, charring almost 100,000 acres and destroying nearly 400 structures in the region.

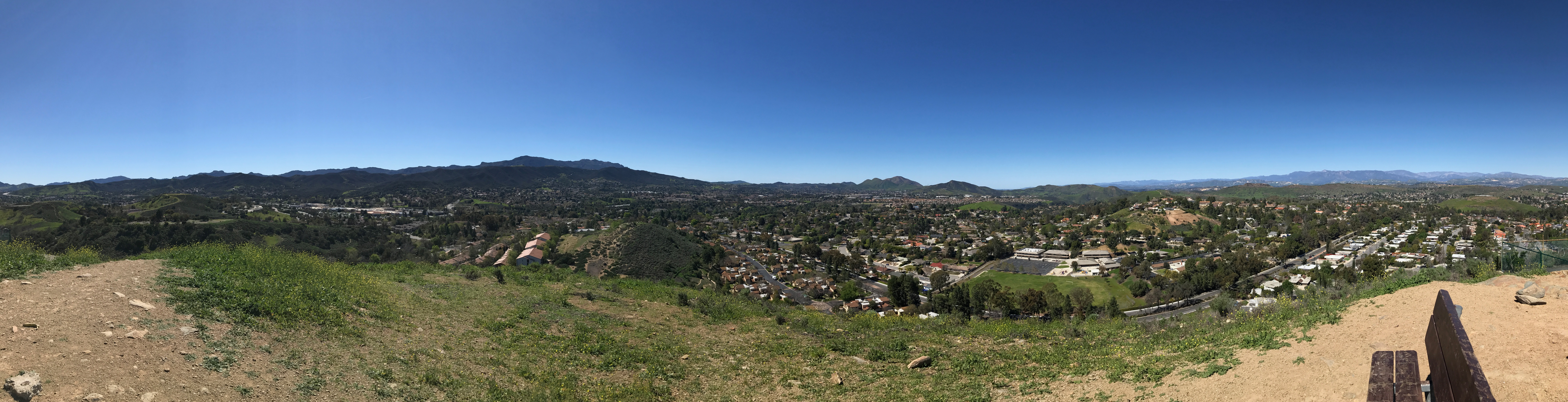
Western Thousand Oaks as seen from atop Tarantula Hill.

== Geography ==
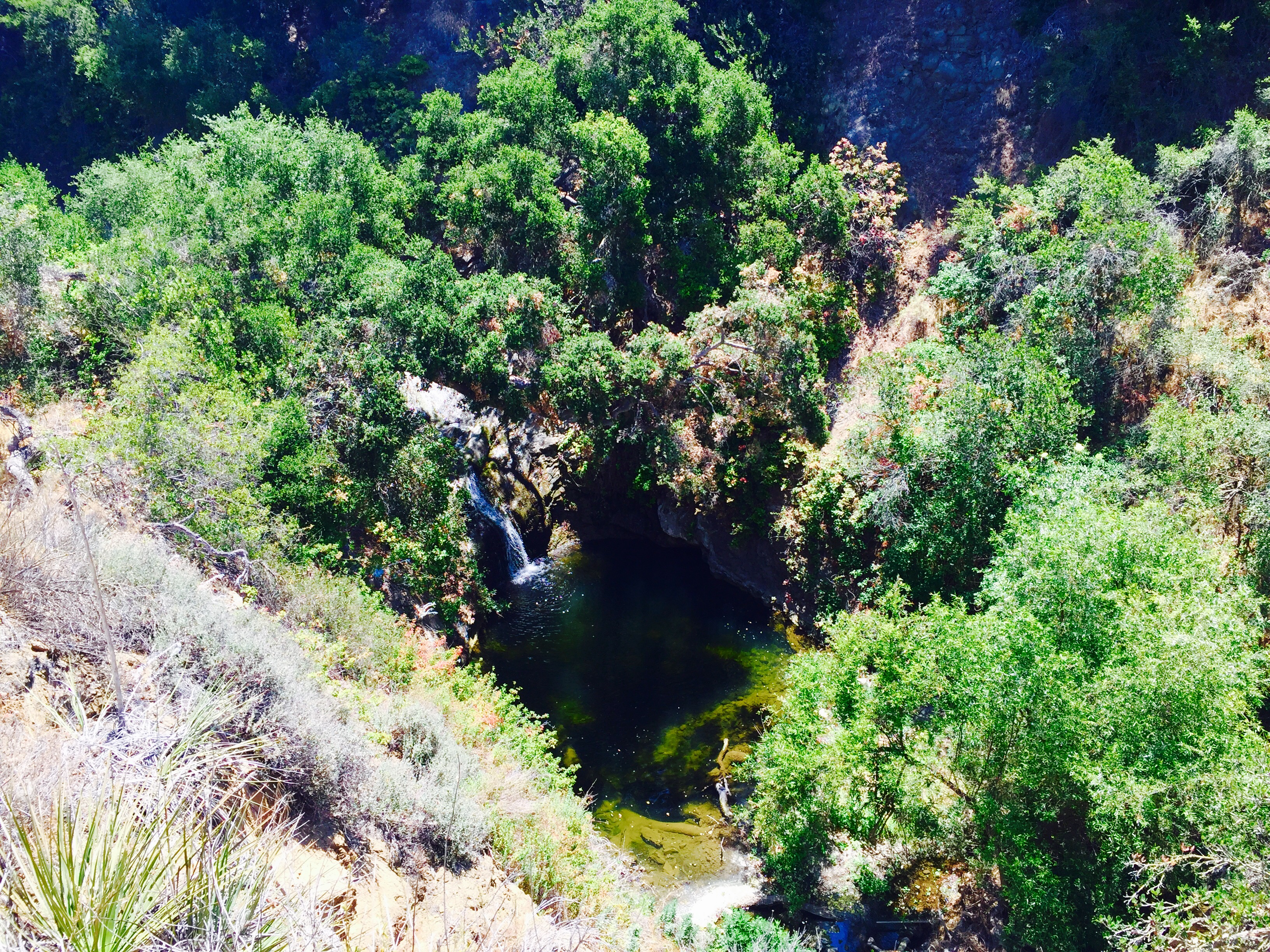
Waterfall in Wildwood Regional Park.

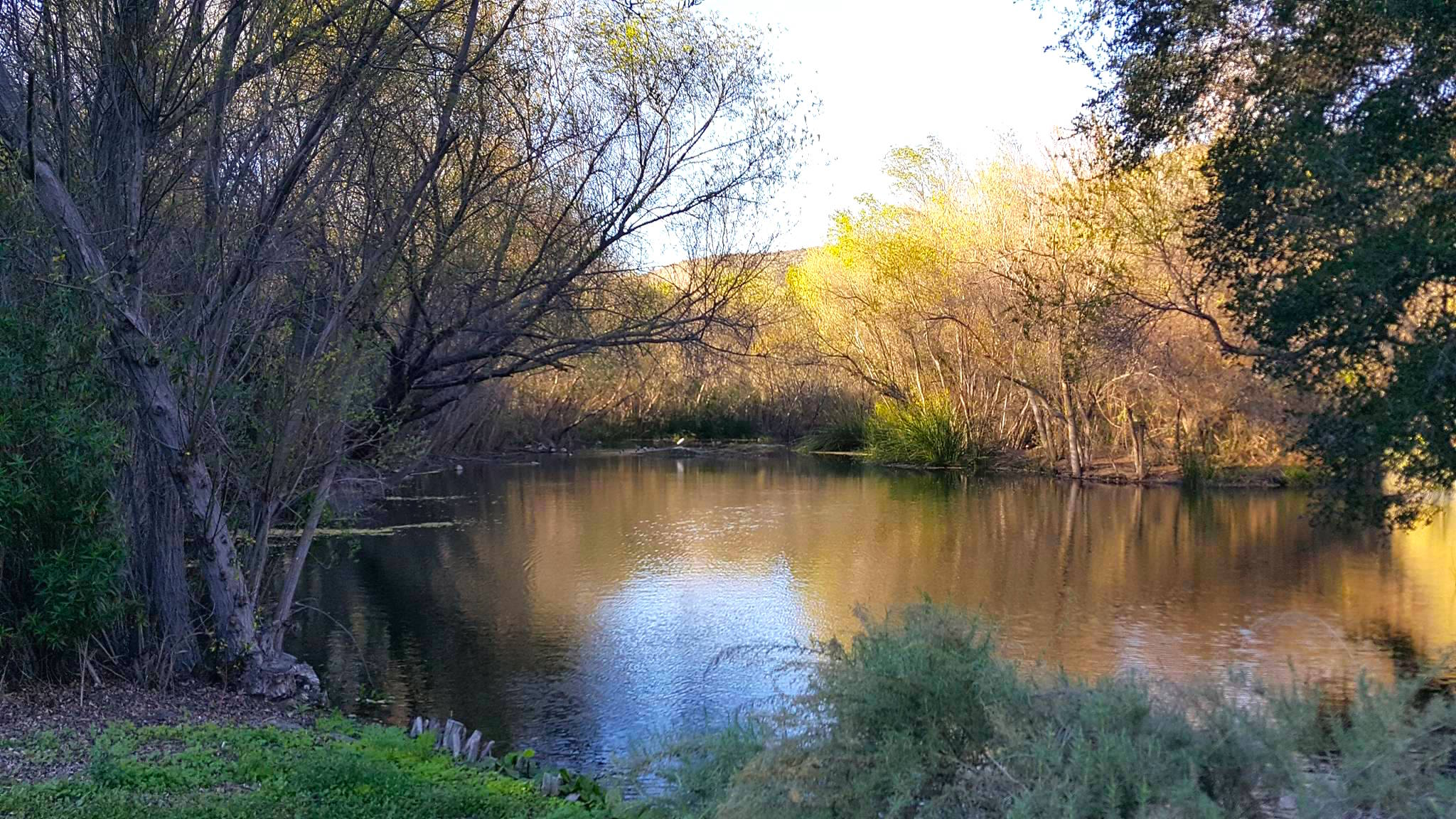
Wetlands in Hill Canyon.

The city of Thousand Oaks is situated in the Conejo Valley in southeastern Ventura County, halfway between Los Angeles and Santa Barbara, and 12 miles east of the Pacific Ocean. Conejo Valley lies at 900 feet; 55 of its 1,884 square miles are located within Thousand Oaks city limits. For comparison, the city is larger in area than Long Beach, CA, and 20 percent larger than San Francisco.

Designated open-space nature areas occupy 34 percent of the city as of 2017 (15,194 acres). 928 acres of the Santa Monica Mountains National Recreation Area (SMMNRA) is within the southern borders of the city. Thousand Oaks is within the Greater Los Angeles Area and is 38 miles west of Los Angeles. The closest coastal city is neighboring Malibu, which may be reached through winding roads, a bike path, or hiking trails crossing the Santa Monica Mountains. Conejo Valley is bordered by the Santa Monica's to the south, Conejo Mountains to the west and north, and the Simi Hills to the northeast.

Newbury Park currently makes up around 40 percent of the city's total land area.

According to the United States Census Bureau, the city has a total area of 55.4 square miles (143 km^{2}). 55.3 square miles (143 km^{2}) of it is land and 0.15 square miles (0.39 km^{2}) of it (0.26%) is water.

Although Thousand Oaks has several shopping centers, including the Janss Marketplace mall, The Oaks mall, and W. Thousand Oaks Blvd., a large portion of the city's inhabitants live in suburban communities a distance from the commercial centers of the city. The large housing districts near Lynn Road to the north and west are an example of this sprawl, despite attempts by Ventura County planners to reduce it. Many housing tracts are surrounded by walls. This design is meant to keep heavy traffic away from residential roads.

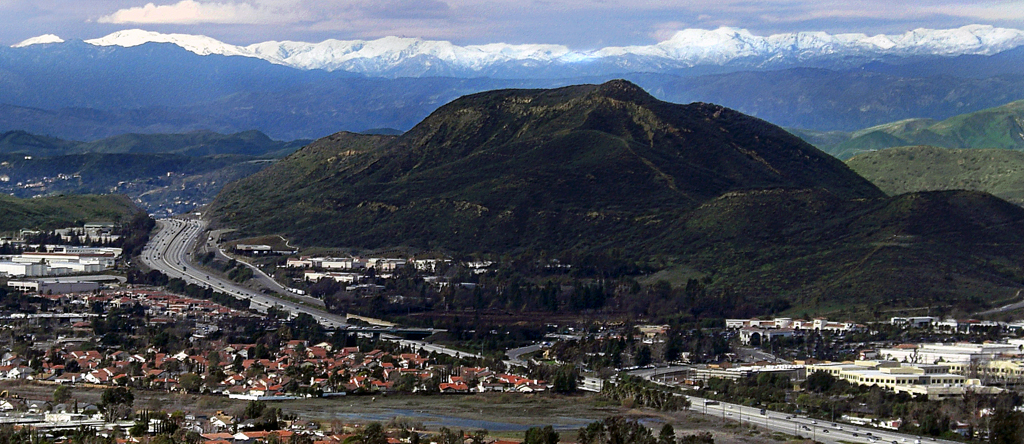
Conejo Grade in westernmost Newbury Park. The Topa Topa Mountains can be seen in the far back.

=== Physiography ===
The physiography is dominated by prominent knolls, surrounding mountains, open vistas and native oak woodland. It is home to 50,000–60,000 oak trees, and the city is characterized by its many oak trees and rolling green hills.

The northern parts consist of mountainous terrain in the Simi Hills, Conejo Mountains and Mount Clef Ridge. Narrow canyons such as Hill Canyon cut through the steeper mountainous areas. Conejo Mountain and Conejo Grade are found in westernmost Newbury Park, while the southernmost parts of Thousand Oaks are made up of Russell Valley, Hidden Valley and the steep rugged slopes of the Santa Monica Mountains. The elevation ranges from 500 feet in the northwest to the 2,403 feet Simi Peak. The major drainage is Conejo Creek (Arroyo Conejo).

Wetlands include Lake Eleanor, Paradise Falls in Wildwood Regional Park, Twin Ponds in Dos Vientos and the 7-acre Hill Canyon Wetlands.

=== Wildlife ===
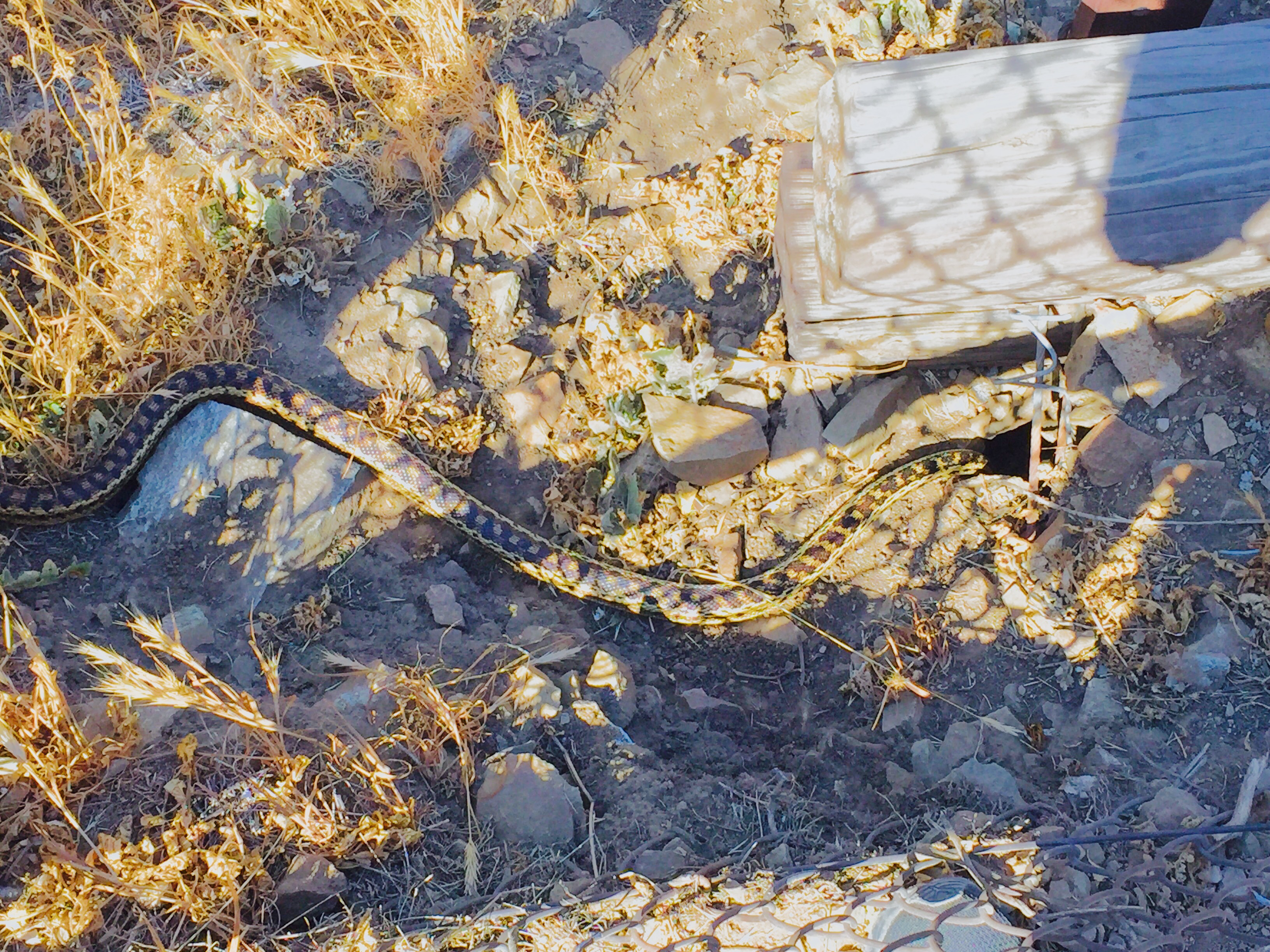
Gopher snake in Wildwood Regional Park

Thousand Oaks' fauna includes mammals such as mountain lions, bobcats, coyotes, bears, grey fox and mule deer, as well as smaller mammals as the striped and spotted skunk, California raccoon, Virginia opossum, Audubon's cottontail, long-tailed weasel, Botta's pocket gopher, ring-tailed cat, California vole, western brush rabbit, western gray squirrel, and several species of rat and mouse, where the most common are deer mouse and Merriam's kangaroo rat. The mountain lions which can be encountered or observed in most larger open-spaces in the city. The city recommends hikers not to hike alone, and always to keep children near. Mountain lions have been encountered numerous times in recent years, such as in Lynn Ranch in 2017 and Newbury Park in 2016, but are usually found in the adjacent Simi Hills, Santa Monica Mountains, and the Santa Susana Mountains. The drought may have brought a bear cub into the city in 2021. The habitat is suited to an abundance of native animals, such as coyotes, hawks, crawdads, ducks, turtles, mule deer, numerous songbirds, mountain lions, several species of snakes, and numerous species of raptors.

Some of the amphibians and reptiles found in Thousand Oaks include lizards such as side-blotched lizards, southern alligator lizards and western fence lizards, as well as the southwestern pond turtle and crawdads, and numerous species of snake, including southern Pacific rattlesnakes, San Diego gopher snakes, striped racers, California kingsnakes, common kingsnakes, ringneck snakes, and western aquatic garter snakes. Some amphibians found in Thousand Oaks include ensatina, slender salamander, western toad, American bullfrog, California toad, Pacific tree frog, and the California red-legged frog.

==== Avifauna ====
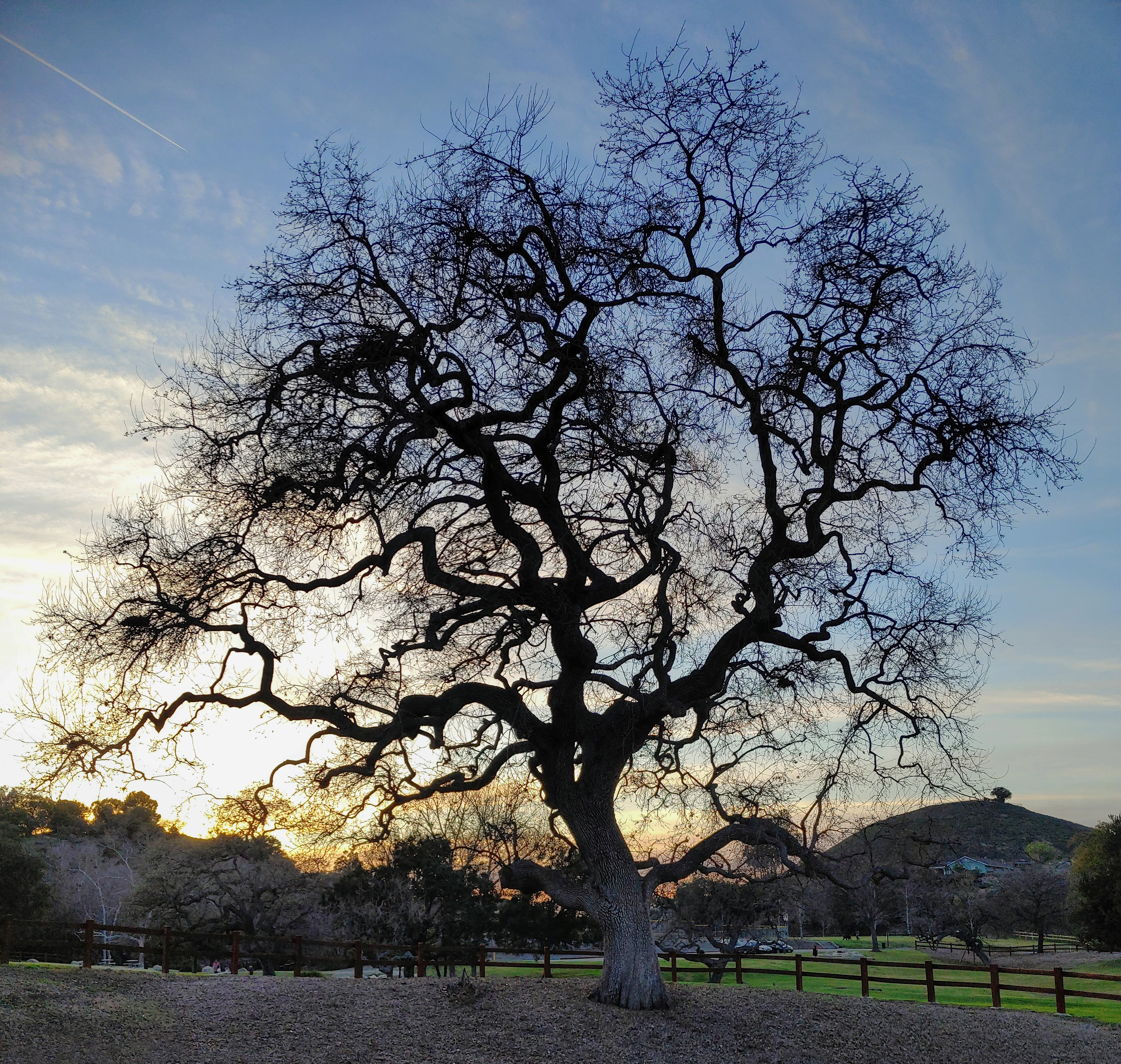
Birds nesting on Valley Oak at 1259 Hendrix Ave. Tarantula Hill on the background.

There have been observed a total of 171 bird species within the city limits. The most commonly encountered avifauna include the house sparrow, house finch, Brewer's blackbird, California towhee, spotted towhee, oak titmouse, acorn woodpecker, and California quail. Raptor population densities in the Conejo Valley, which therefore has some of the highest quantities of raptors in the U.S. Some of the raptors found in the City of Thousand Oaks include the golden eagle, red-tailed hawk, Cooper's hawk, marsh hawk, sharp-shinned hawk, red-shouldered hawk, ferruginous hawk, pigeon hawk, prairie falcon, turkey vulture, barn owl, great horned owl, screech owl, American kestrel, and the white-tailed kite.

=== Flora ===
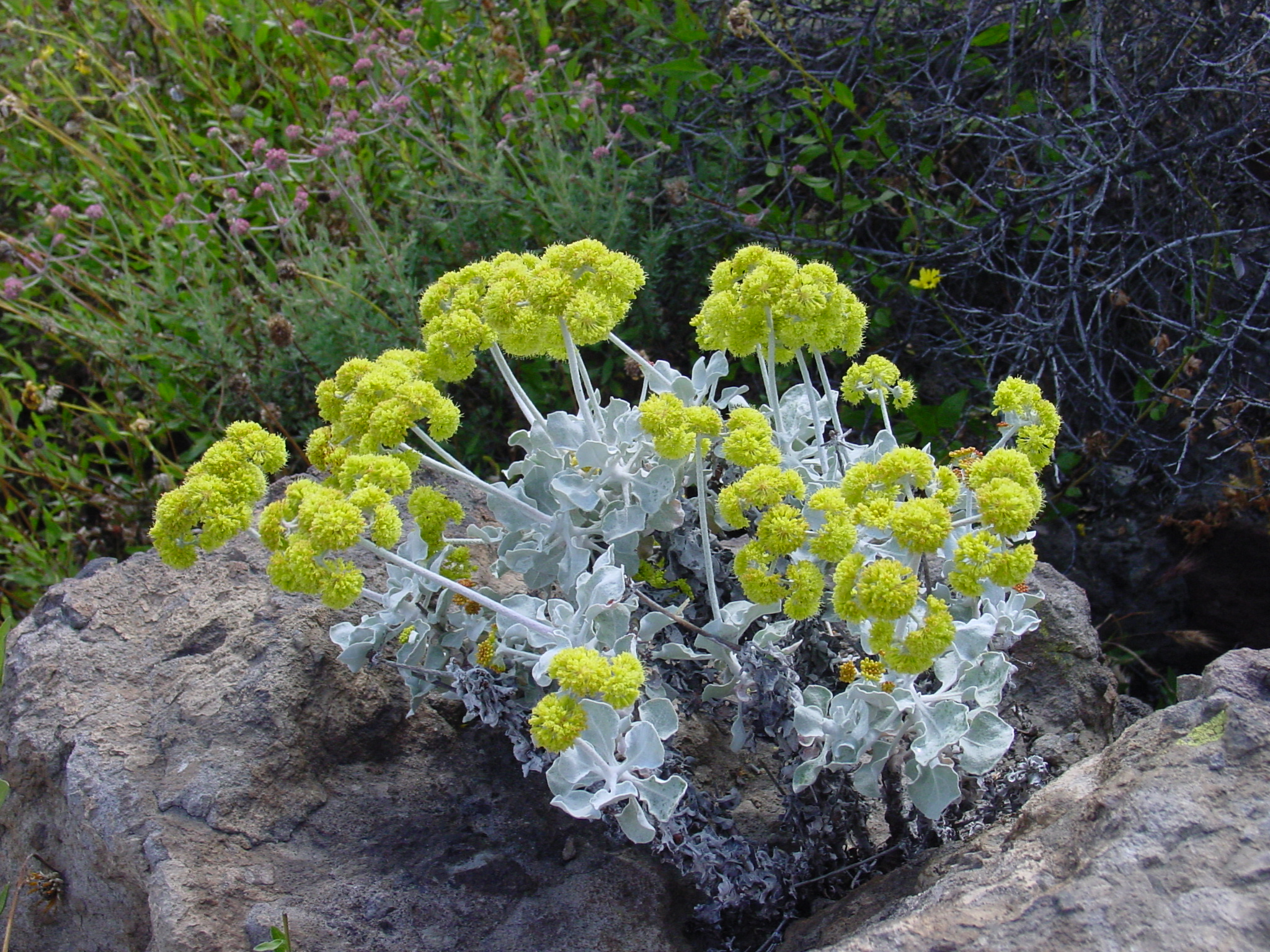
Conejo buckwheat is found only on two locations in Conejo Valley.

Thousand Oaks is home to over 100 species of plants, while 400 species can be found within 100 sq. mi. of the city. There are four endangered plant species: Conejo buckwheat, Santa Monica dudleya, Conejo dudleya and Lyon's pentachaeta. There are between 50- and 60,000 oak trees in Thousand Oaks. Four oak species are native to Thousand Oaks: valley oak, coast live oak, scrub oak, and Palmer's oak. The city's largest oak has a trunk of 12 ft. in diameter and is located at Chumash Indian Museum. Thousand Oaks has the designation "Tree City USA" and has received the Trail Town USA Hall of Fame award.

Thousand Oaks is home to endemic species found nowhere else on Earth. The wildflower species Conejo buckwheat, which is native to the Conejo Valley, is found only in Wildwood Regional Park and near the Conejo Grade. It only grows on volcanic rock, and has yellow flowers which bloom April–July. It is in danger of becoming extinct. Another endemic species to Thousand Oaks, Conejo dudleya, is found throughout the valley, including in Wildwood Regional Park and also in the Santa Monica Mountains.

A notable tree is the 300-year-old "Historic Sycamore Tree", which is designated Ventura County Landmark No. 44 and Thousand Oaks Historical Landmark No. 2. It is located at the "Tri-Village Complex" at Stagecoach Inn, Newbury Park.

Native flora can be seen at botanical gardens throughout the city, including at Gardens of the World, Conejo Valley Botanic Garden, the ethnobotanic gardens at Chumash Indian Museum, and along the Nature Trail at Stagecoach Inn in Newbury Park.

=== Climate ===
Thousand Oaks, California

Climate chart (precipitation, max. and min. temperature)
J	F	M	A	M	J	J	A	S	O	N	D
4.2 67 36	4.2 68 38	3 70 40	1.1 74 43	0.3 77 47	0.1 83 50	0 91 55	0 91 54	0.2 89 52	0.4 82 47	1.6 75 40	2.3 68 36
- █ Average max. and min. temperatures in °F
- █ Precipitation totals in inches
Metric conversion
J	F	M	A	M	J	J	A	S	O	N	D
107 19 2	107 20 3	76 21 4	28 23 6	7.6 25 8	2.5 28 10	0 33 13	0 33 12	5.1 32 11	10 28 8	41 24 4	58 20 2
- █ Average max. and min. temperatures in °C
- █ Precipitation totals in mm

The region experiences a warm-summer Mediterranean climate (Csa in the Köppen climate classification). Vegetation is typical of Mediterranean environments, with chaparral and grasses on the hillsides and numerous western valley oaks. Its elevation ranges from about 500 to 900 feet (excluding the mountains and hills). The area has slightly cooler temperatures than the surrounding areas, as it receives cooler air from the ocean through various hill and mountain passes. On March 10 and 11, 2006, snow fell on the peak of Boney Mountain, the first snow to fall in the area in about 20 years. Snow also fell on Boney Peak on December 17 and 18, 2008.

In line with the rest of coastal California, temperatures at solar noon tend to fluctuate between 70 and 80 °F (21 and 27 °C) during summer, and rarely drop below 60–65 °F (16–18 °C) during winter.

The Newbury Park portion of Thousand Oaks has the coolest summer weather with highs averaging about 80 degrees compared to 90 degrees for central Thousand Oaks.

Climate data for Thousand Oaks, California
Month	Jan	Feb	Mar	Apr	May	Jun	Jul	Aug	Sep	Oct	Nov	Dec	Year
Record high °F (°C)	94 (34)	92 (33)	98 (37)	104 (40)	105 (41)	119 (48)	117 (47)	115 (46)	119 (48)	108 (42)	100 (38)	94 (34)	119 (48)
Mean daily maximum °F (°C)	66.6 (19.2)	67.9 (19.9)	70.2 (21.2)	73.9 (23.3)	77.4 (25.2)	83.4 (28.6)	90.9 (32.7)	91.4 (33.0)	88.7 (31.5)	82.1 (27.8)	74.8 (23.8)	67.9 (19.9)	77.9 (25.5)
Mean daily minimum °F (°C)	35.9 (2.2)	38.1 (3.4)	40.0 (4.4)	43.1 (6.2)	46.9 (8.3)	50.2 (10.1)	54.5 (12.5)	54.2 (12.3)	52.1 (11.2)	46.7 (8.2)	40.3 (4.6)	36.4 (2.4)	44.9 (7.2)
Record low °F (°C)	13 (−11)	22 (−6)	25 (−4)	27 (−3)	31 (−1)	34 (1)	40 (4)	40 (4)	37 (3)	27 (−3)	23 (−5)	16 (−9)	13 (−11)
Average precipitation inches (mm)	4.18 (106)	4.15 (105)	2.99 (76)	1.07 (27)	0.30 (7.6)	0.05 (1.3)	0.03 (0.76)	0.04 (1.0)	0.21 (5.3)	0.40 (10)	1.59 (40)	2.33 (59)	17.35 (441)
Average snowfall inches (cm)	0.1 (0.25)	0 (0)	0 (0)	0 (0)	0 (0)	0 (0)	0 (0)	0 (0)	0 (0)	0 (0)	0 (0)	0 (0)	0.1 (0.25)
Source 1:
Source 2: all-time record high:

== Demographics ==
Historical population
Census	Pop.	Note	%±
1950	1,243		—
1960	2,934		136.0%
1970	35,873		1,122.7%
1980	77,072		114.8%
1990	104,352		35.4%
2000	117,005		12.1%
2010	126,683		8.3%
2020	126,966		0.2%
2024 (est.)	124,229	▼	−2.2%
U.S. Decennial Census

Ancestry in Thousand Oaks
Origin	percent
German American	15.8%
Mexican American	12.9%
English American	11.7%
Irish American	10.7%
Italian American	7.2%
Russian American	3.4%
Chinese American	3.3%
French American	3.2%
Polish American	3.2%
Scottish American	2.7%
Indian American	2.7%
Norwegian American	2.2%
Swedish American	2%
Dutch American	1.5%
African American	1.3%
Other (Note: Mostly Multiracial American, other Asian or other European ancestry)	18.9%

The city neighborhoods were built for the blue- and white-collar class in the 1950s. Today it is an upscale city with highly educated residents.

Thousand Oaks city, California – Racial and ethnic composition Note: the US Census treats Hispanic/Latino as an ethnic category. This table excludes Latinos from the racial categories and assigns them to a separate category. Hispanics/Latinos may be of any race.
Race / Ethnicity (NH = Non-Hispanic)	Pop 2000	Pop 2010	Pop 2020	% 2000	% 2010	% 2020
White alone (NH)	90,862	88,970	79,866	77.66%	70.23%	62.90%
Black or African American alone (NH)	1,162	1,508	1,707	0.99%	1.19%	1.34%
Native American or Alaska Native alone (NH)	345	231	226	0.29%	0.18%	0.18%
Asian alone (NH)	6,826	10,928	12,517	5.83%	8.63%	9.86%
Pacific Islander alone (NH)	108	134	159	0.09%	0.11%	0.13%
Some Other Race alone (NH)	142	271	768	0.12%	0.21%	0.60%
Mixed race or Multiracial (NH)	2,232	3,300	6,463	1.91%	2.60%	5.09%
Hispanic or Latino (any race)	15,328	21,341	25,260	13.10%	16.85%	19.90%
Total	117,005	126,683	126,966	100.00%	100.00%	100.00%

=== 2020 ===
The 2020 United States census reported that Thousand Oaks had a population of 126,966. The population density was 2,297.7 inhabitants per square mile (887.1/km^{2}). The racial makeup of Thousand Oaks was 66.9% White, 1.4% African American, 0.7% Native American, 10.0% Asian, 0.1% Pacific Islander, 7.8% from other races, and 13.0% from two or more races. Hispanic or Latino of any race were 19.9% of the population.

The census reported that 98.3% of the population lived in households, 1.4% lived in non-institutionalized group quarters, and 0.3% were institutionalized.

There were 46,620 households, out of which 30.5% included children under the age of 18, 57.1% were married-couple households, 4.7% were cohabiting couple households, 24.1% had a female householder with no partner present, and 14.1% had a male householder with no partner present. 21.9% of households were one person, and 12.1% were one person aged 65 or older. The average household size was 2.68. There were 33,858 families (72.6% of all households).

The age distribution was 19.9% under the age of 18, 9.2% aged 18 to 24, 20.9% aged 25 to 44, 29.3% aged 45 to 64, and 20.7% who were 65 years of age or older. The median age was 45.0 years. For every 100 females, there were 94.5 males.

There were 48,131 housing units at an average density of 871.0 units per square mile (336.3 units/km^{2}), of which 46,620 (96.9%) were occupied. Of these, 70.2% were owner-occupied, and 29.8% were occupied by renters.

In 2023, the US Census Bureau estimated that the median household income in 2023 was $134,367, and the per capita income was $64,448. About 4.6% of families and 8.0% of the population were below the poverty line.

=== 2010 ===
The 2010 United States census reported that Thousand Oaks had a population of 126,683. The population density was 2,295.8 inhabitants per square mile (886.4/km^{2}). The racial makeup of Thousand Oaks was 101,702 (80.3%) White, 1,674 (1.3%) African American, 497 (0.4%) Native American, 11,043 (8.7%) Asian, 146 (0.1%) Pacific Islander, 6,869 (5.4%) from other races, and 4,752 (3.8%) from two or more races. Hispanic or Latino of any race were 21,341 persons (16.8%). The largest ancestry group is German-Americans 20,381 (15.8%), followed by Mexican 16,640 (12.9%), English 15,092 (11.7%), Irish 13,802 (10.7%), Italian 9,287 (7.2%), Russian 4,385 (3.4%), Chinese 4,256 (3.3%), French 4,127 (3.2%), Polish 4,127 (3.2%), Scottish 3,482 (2.7%), Indian 3,482 (2.7%), Norwegian 2,837 (2.2%) and Swedish 2,579 (2%).

The census reported that 124,941 people (98.6% of the population) lived in households, 1,390 (1.1%) lived in non-institutionalized group quarters, and 352 (0.3%) were institutionalized.

There were 45,836 households, out of which 16,439 (35.9%) had children under the age of 18 living in them, 27,206 (59.4%) were opposite-sex married couples living together, 4,260 (9.3%) had a female householder with no husband present, 1,925 (4.2%) had a male householder with no wife present. There were 1,761 (3.8%) unmarried opposite-sex partnerships, and 284 (0.6%) same-sex married couples or partnerships. 9,728 households (21.2%) were made up of individuals, and 4,459 (9.7%) had someone living alone who was 65 years of age or older. The average household size was 2.73. There were 33,391 families (72.8% of all households); the average family size was 3.15.

The population was spread out, with 30,076 people (23.7%) under the age of 18, 10,226 people (8.1%) aged 18 to 24, 29,853 people (23.6%) aged 25 to 44, 37,964 people (30.0%) aged 45 to 64, and 18,564 people (14.7%) who were 65 years of age or older. The median age was 41.5 years. For every 100 females, there were 95.8 males. For every 100 females age 18 and over, there were 93.3 males.

There were 47,497 housing units at an average density of 860.8 units per square mile (332.4 units/km^{2}), of which 33,501 (73.1%) were owner-occupied, and 12,335 (26.9%) were occupied by renters. The homeowner vacancy rate was 0.8%; the rental vacancy rate was 5.6%. 92,510 people (73.0% of the population) lived in owner-occupied housing units and 32,431 people (25.6%) lived in rental housing units. The median income for a household in the city was $121,088.

=== Crime ===
Thousand Oaks is one of the safest cities in the United States, according to consistent FBI reporting. In 2013, Thousand Oaks was ranked the fourth safest city with a population over 100,000 in the United States, according to an annual report by the FBI. It has one of the lowest crime rates in California. In 2016, The company Niche ranked Thousand Oaks as the second-safest city in the United States. The city experienced its first homicide in four years in October 2014. In 2018, the city was the site of a mass shooting at the Borderline bar.

Since the 1990s, the city has experienced a general decrease in crime. In 2015, there were 1.05 violent crimes per 1,000 residents, up from 0.99 in 2014. Overall, the city experienced a one percent crime decrease between 2014 and 2015. Petty theft was the most-reported crime category in 2013, accounting for 40% of all crimes.

== Economy ==
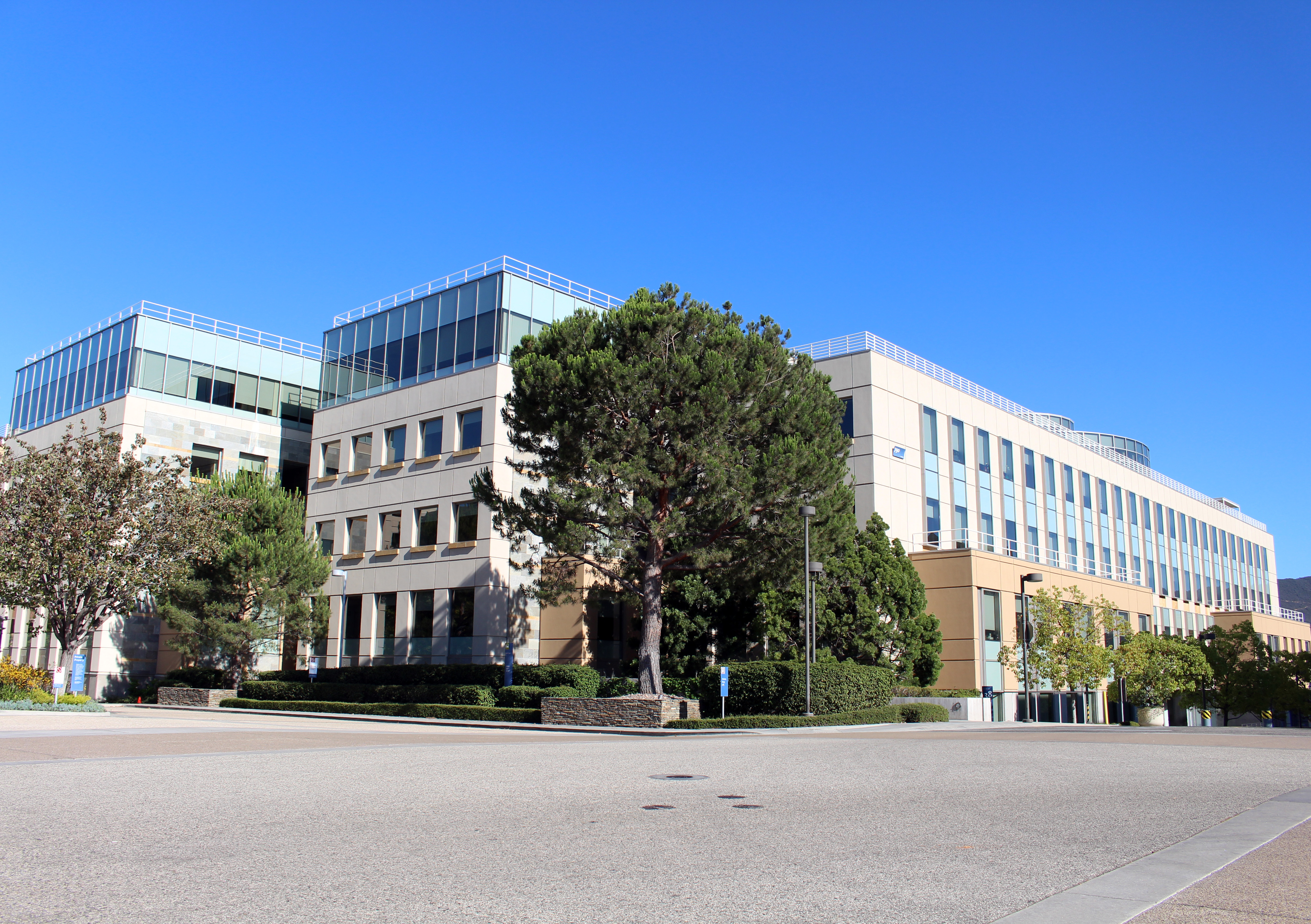
Amgen is the world's largest biotechnology firm and the largest employer in the Conejo Valley.

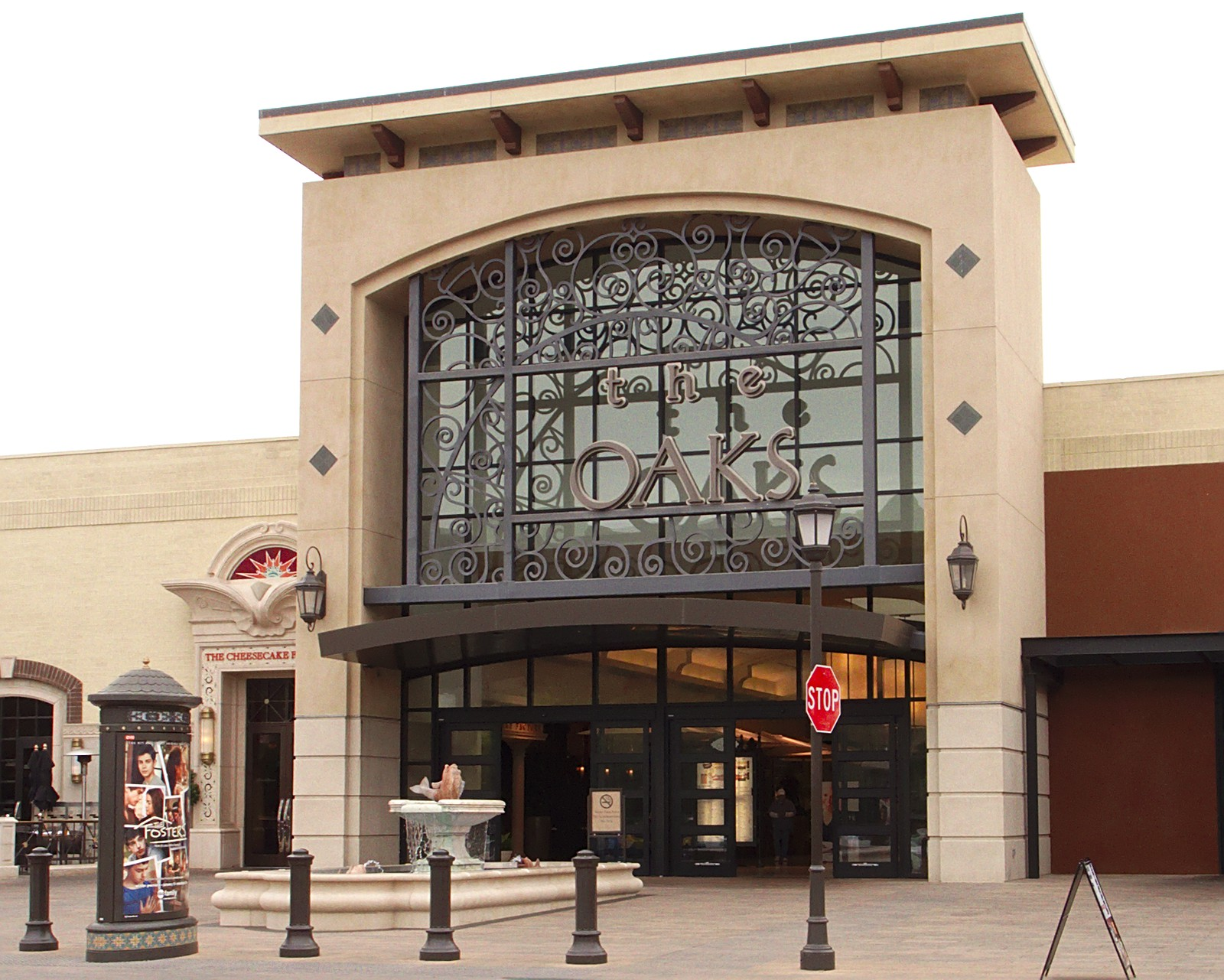
The Oaks is the largest shopping mall in Ventura County.

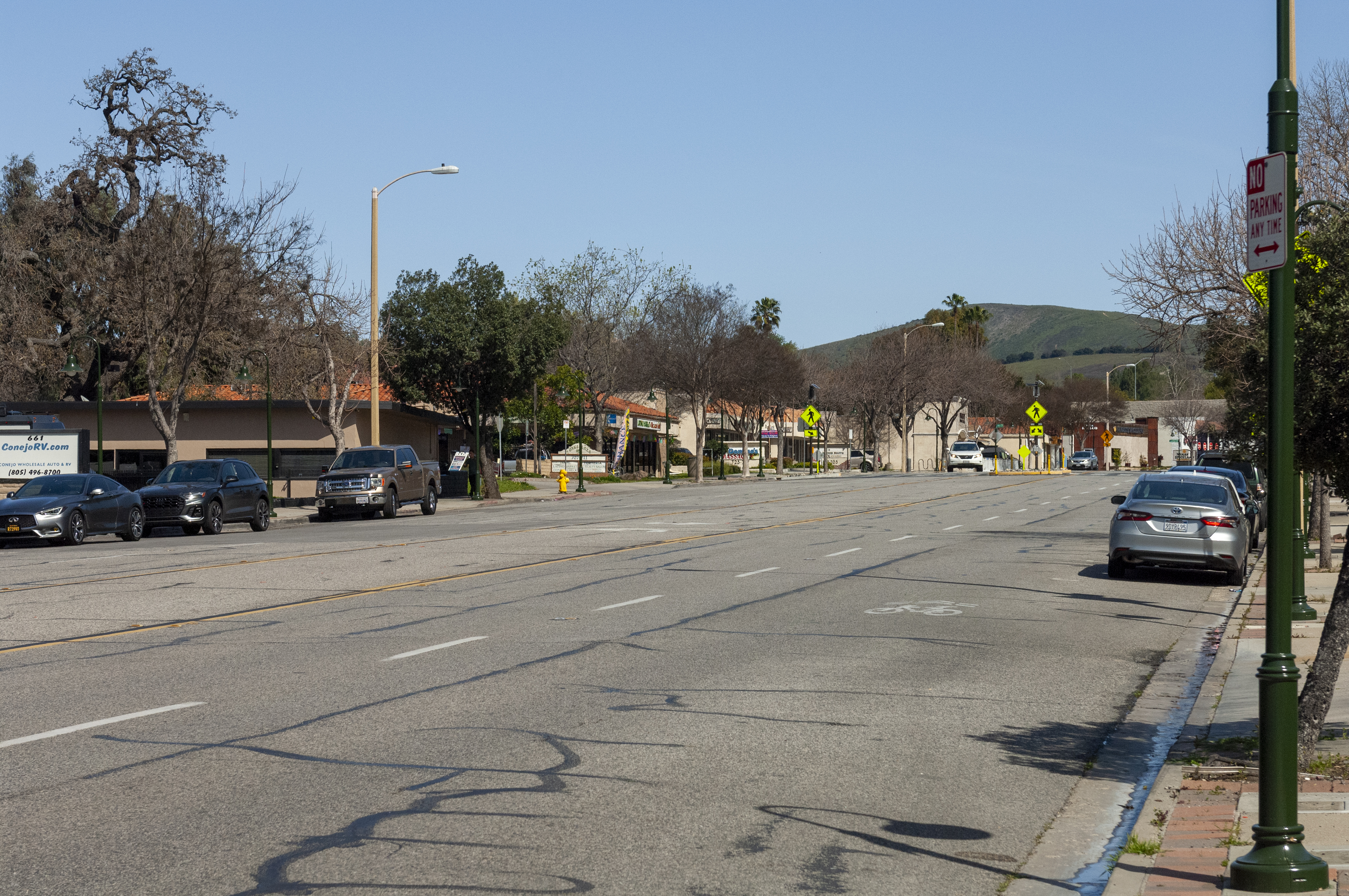
Looking east down Thousand Oaks Boulevard

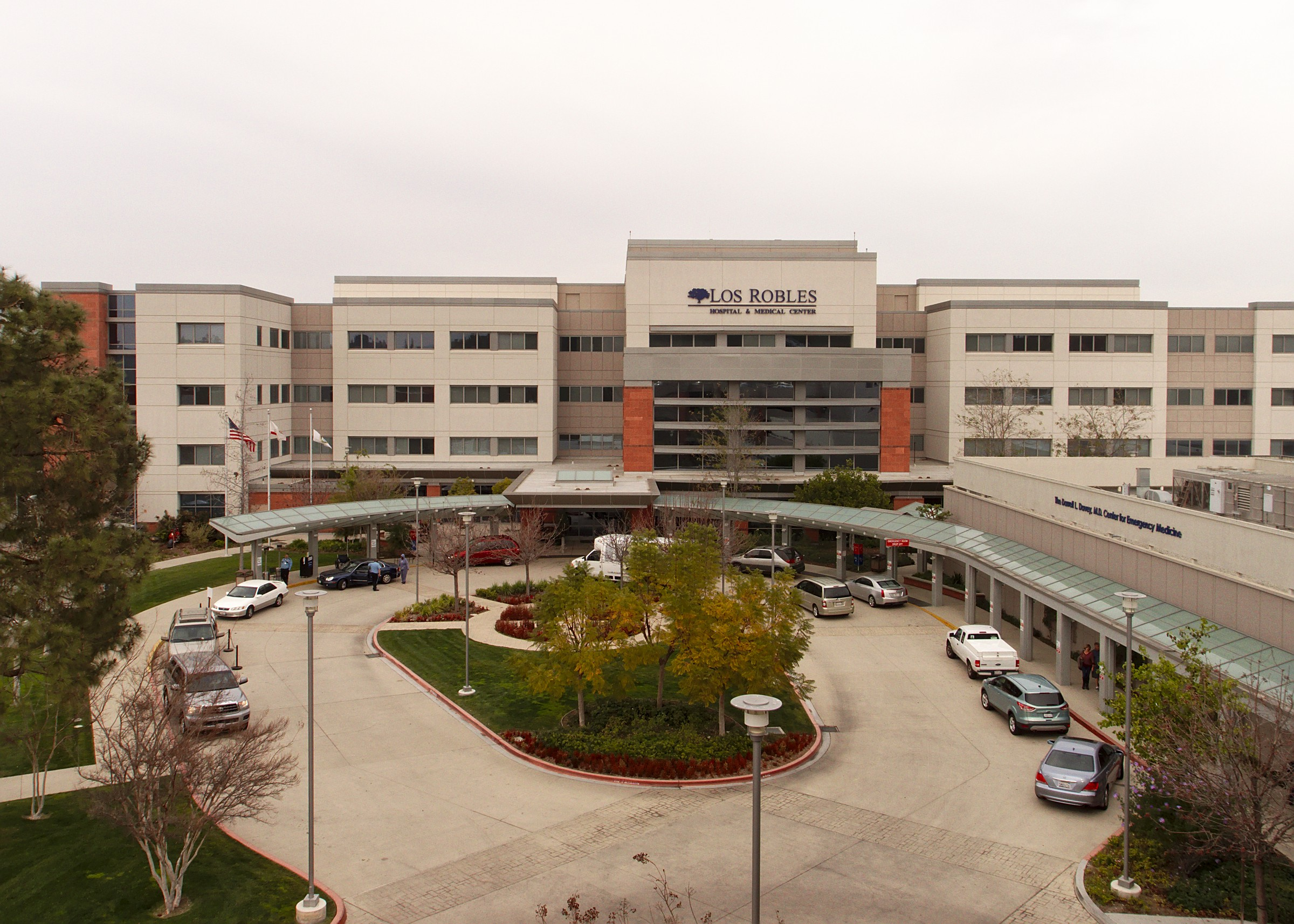
Los Robles Hospital has earned multiple top honors for its specialized care.

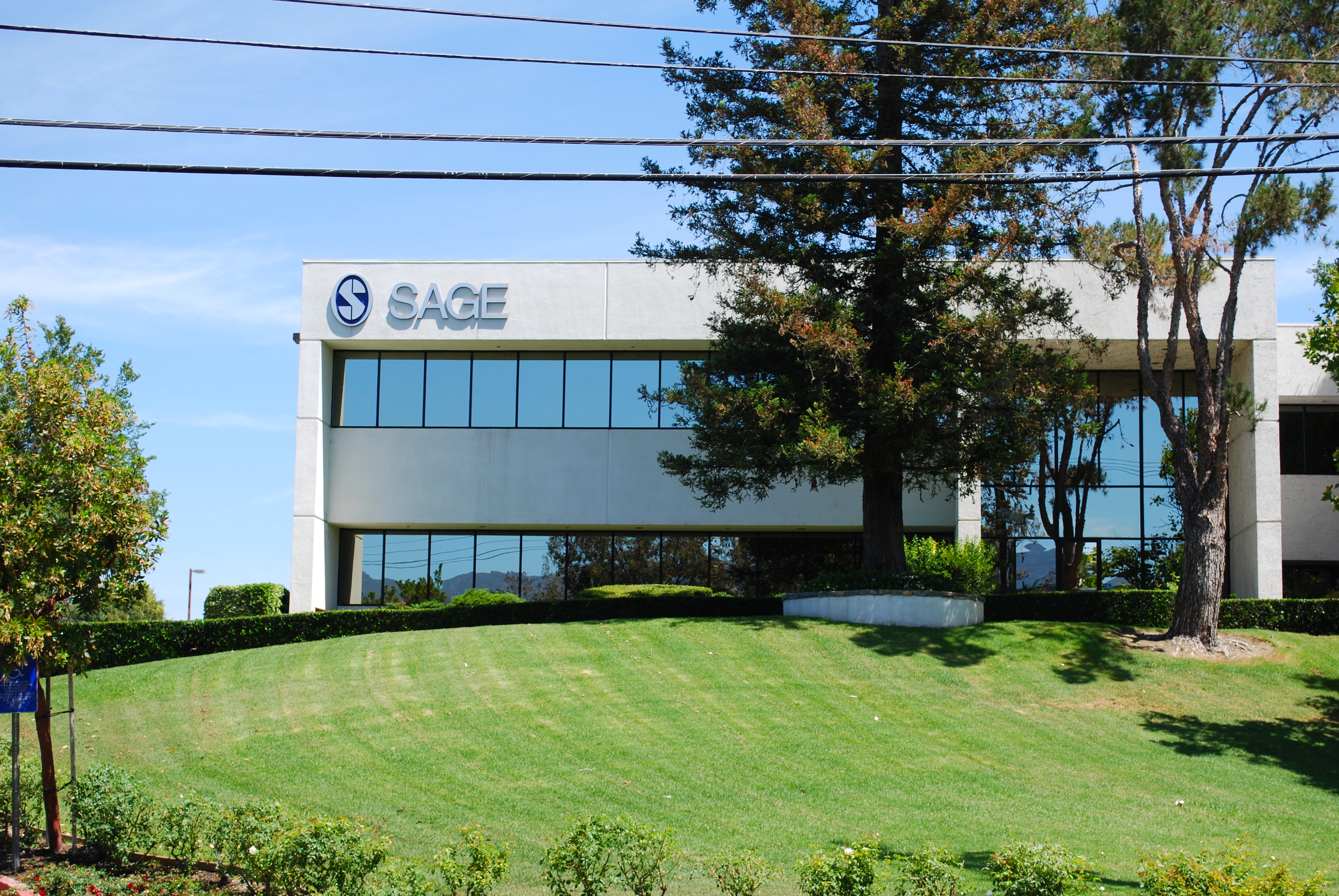
SAGE Publishing is headquartered in Newbury Park, CA.

While agriculture was the dominant industry in Thousand Oaks until the 1950s, a number of high-tech companies moved to Newbury Park in the 1960s. The city is a biotech hub anchored by Amgen with life sciences being one of the economic engines of the community.

The city's economy is based on a range of businesses including biotechnology, electronics, automotive, aerospace, telecommunications, healthcare, and financing. Besides Amgen, other companies with corporate headquarters in the city include Teledyne Technologies, SAGE Publishing, and Skyworks Solutions, while Bank of America, Baxter International, General Dynamics Corporation, Volkswagen, Audi, General Motors, BMW, and Anthem Blue Cross manage regional offices. Thousand Oaks also has large employers as Los Robles Hospital & Medical Center, Conejo Valley Unified School District, City of Thousand Oaks, Hyatt Hotels, Swickard Auto Group, and California Lutheran University headquartered in the city. The city was also the former home to the corporate offices of Wellpoint and GTE, which later became Verizon, which relocated in the last decade. Hewlett-Packard was also previously located here.

J.D. Power and Associates is headquartered in Thousand Oaks. J.D. Power began moving its employees from its former headquarters in nearby Agoura Hills, to its current headquarters in the Westlake section of Thousand Oaks in 2002. The communities of Thousand Oaks, Westlake Village, and Agoura Hills are served by the Greater Conejo Valley Chamber of Commerce.

Demographic data showed in 2002 that more and more of the local labor force was living within 20 miles (32 km) of their place of work, and fewer Thousand Oaks residents were making the commute to Los Angeles. Over 40 percent of residents are employed as executives or business professionals.

=== Cannabis ===
Under the legalization of the sale and distribution of cannabis in California, city voters approved a marijuana business tax, Measure P, in November 2018. Commercial activities, such as growing, testing, and selling cannabis within their jurisdiction may be regulated by each city by licensing none or only some of these activities but local governments may not prohibit adults from growing, using, or transporting marijuana for personal use. The two medical cannabis dispensaries that opened in February 2022 requested that the city amend the ordinance to allow them to sell recreational cannabis due to competition from dispensaries in other communities that sell both and delivery services that are permitted to operate in the city by state law.

=== Top employers ===
According to the city's 2024 Annual Comprehensive Financial Report, the top employers in the city are:

No.	Employer	No. of employees
1	Amgen Inc.	5,000
2	Conejo Valley Unified School District	3,010
3	Los Robles Hospital & Medical Center	1,800
4	California Lutheran University	1,316
5	Skyworks Solutions Inc	612
6	City of Thousand Oaks	530
7	Takeda Pharmaceutical Company	526
8	Sports Academy	400
9	PennyMac Loan Services	376
10	SAGE Publishing	336

== Arts and culture ==
Conejo Valley Art Museum has showcased collections from artists such as Elizabeth Williams, David Rose and Howard Brodie. Chumash Indian Museum on Lang Ranch Parkway has displays of Chumash artifacts and a reconstructed Chumash village. Another museum, the 1876 Stagecoach Inn, is located in Newbury Park and is a California Historical Landmark. Also in Newbury Park is Satwiwa Native American Indian Culture Center, a museum at the foothills of Mount Boney, which is a sacred site for the Chumash people. American Radio Archive is a museum at Grant R. Brimhall Library dedicated to the history of radio. It contains one of the largest collections of radio broadcasting in the United States and in the world. California Museum of Art was located in The Oaks Shopping Center for a few years after moving from a city-owned property near city hall before closing in 2022.

Thousand Oaks Civic Arts Plaza is home to two theaters: the 1,800-seat Fred Kavli Theatre and Ray Scherr Forum Theatre. Willie Nelson, Paul Anka, Vince Gill, Kris Kristofferson, Trisha Paytas, and Peter, Paul and Mary have performed at Fred Kavli Theatre. Entertainers such as Liza Minnelli, Bill Cosby, David Copperfield, B. B. King, Sheryl Crow and Mikhail Baryshnikov have also performed at the Civic Arts Plaza.

Conejo Players Theatre has over 200 active members and was established in 1958. Hillcrest Center for the Arts is home to Gothic Productions, Young Artists Ensemble, Thousand Oaks Actors Guild and other groups. Hillcrest Center is also home to Classics in the Park, which arranges annual summer concerts in Conejo Community Park. Galleries include Fred Kavli Theatre Gallery, Thousand Oaks Community Art Gallery and William Rolland Gallery of Fine Art.

The annual Scandinavian Festival ("Scan Fest") is an annual weekend spring festival which takes place at California Lutheran University every April. The festival was the first held as an accomplishment of John J. Nordberg, who was instrumental in getting the first American-Scandinavian Foundation chapter chartered in Thousand Oaks. The festival was established in order to boost cultural ties between California Lutheran College and the Nordic countries. The festival offers foods, folk dances, music, literature and art from the Nordic Countries, including from Norway, Sweden, Denmark, Iceland, Finland and the Faroe Islands. The first festival was held in 1974 and was attended by over a thousand visitors.

Conejo Valley Days is an annual spring festival with a carnival.

OakHeart Country Music Festival is an annual outdoor country music concert held in June at the Conejo Creek Park fields. It is put on by the Borderline Bar and Grill and the Rotary Club. Previous performances include Rodney Atkins, Tyler Farr, Justin Moore, Josh Turner, Big & Rich, Jana Kramer, as well as other major names in country music.

On September 22, 2018, the City of Thousand Oaks hosted its first, intersectional LGBTQ+ event outside of the Mary and Richard Carpenter Civic Arts Plaza Park. The Festival hosted over 2,000 attendees and its highlights included LGBTQ+ talent in the form of spoken word, dance, music, and art. The Festival also featured mental and physical health services, LGBTQ+ non-profits, supportive religious organizations, local business vendors, a tribute to the 1969 Stonewall Riots, youth arts/crafts, and more. The initial goal of this event was to bring critical visibility to the entire LGBTQ+ community of the Conejo Valley and to provide a cathartic experience for all attendees. The festival's organizers hope to make this an annual tradition.

=== Points of interest ===
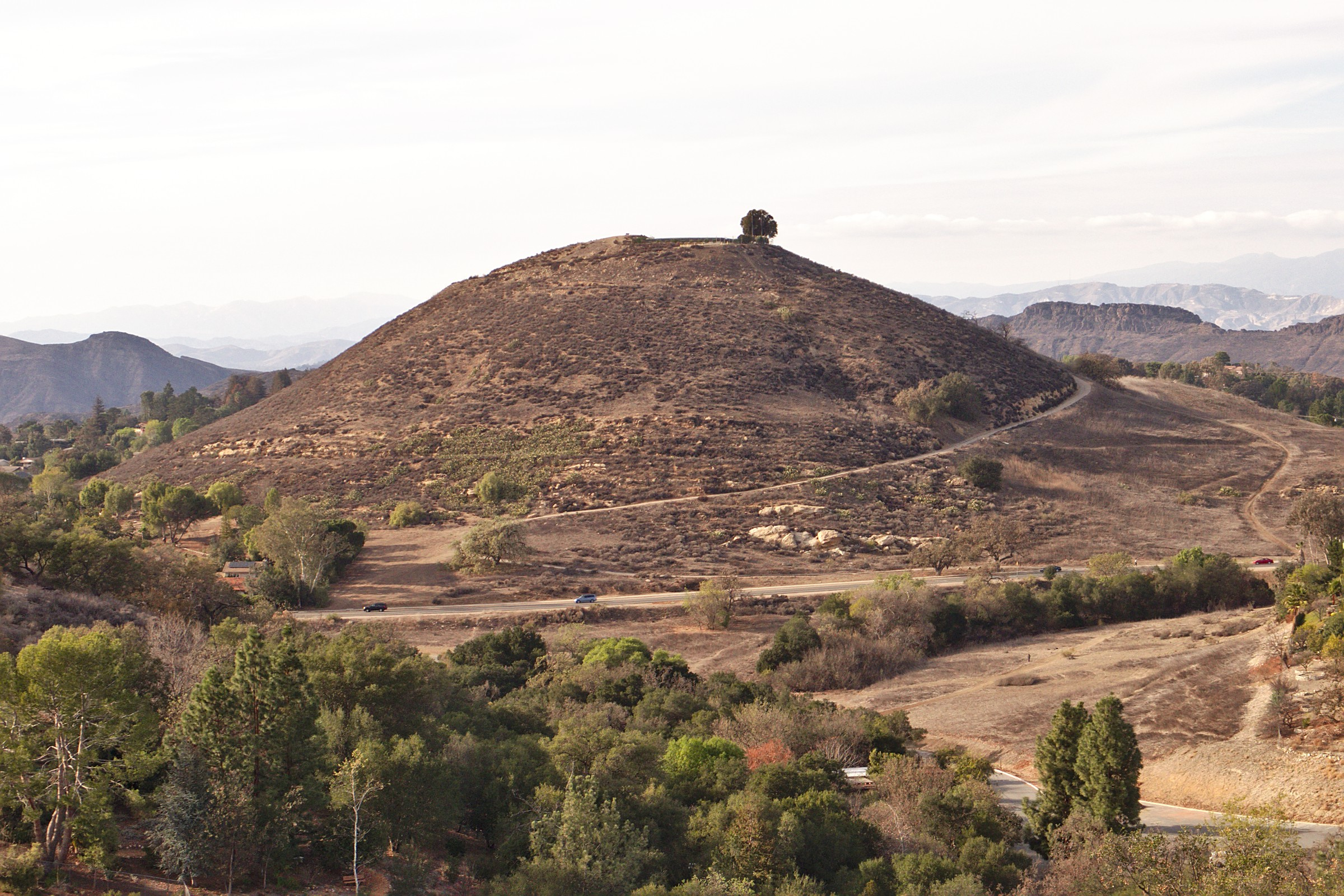
The 1,057 feet (322 m) Tarantula Hill, the highest point in Thousand Oaks.

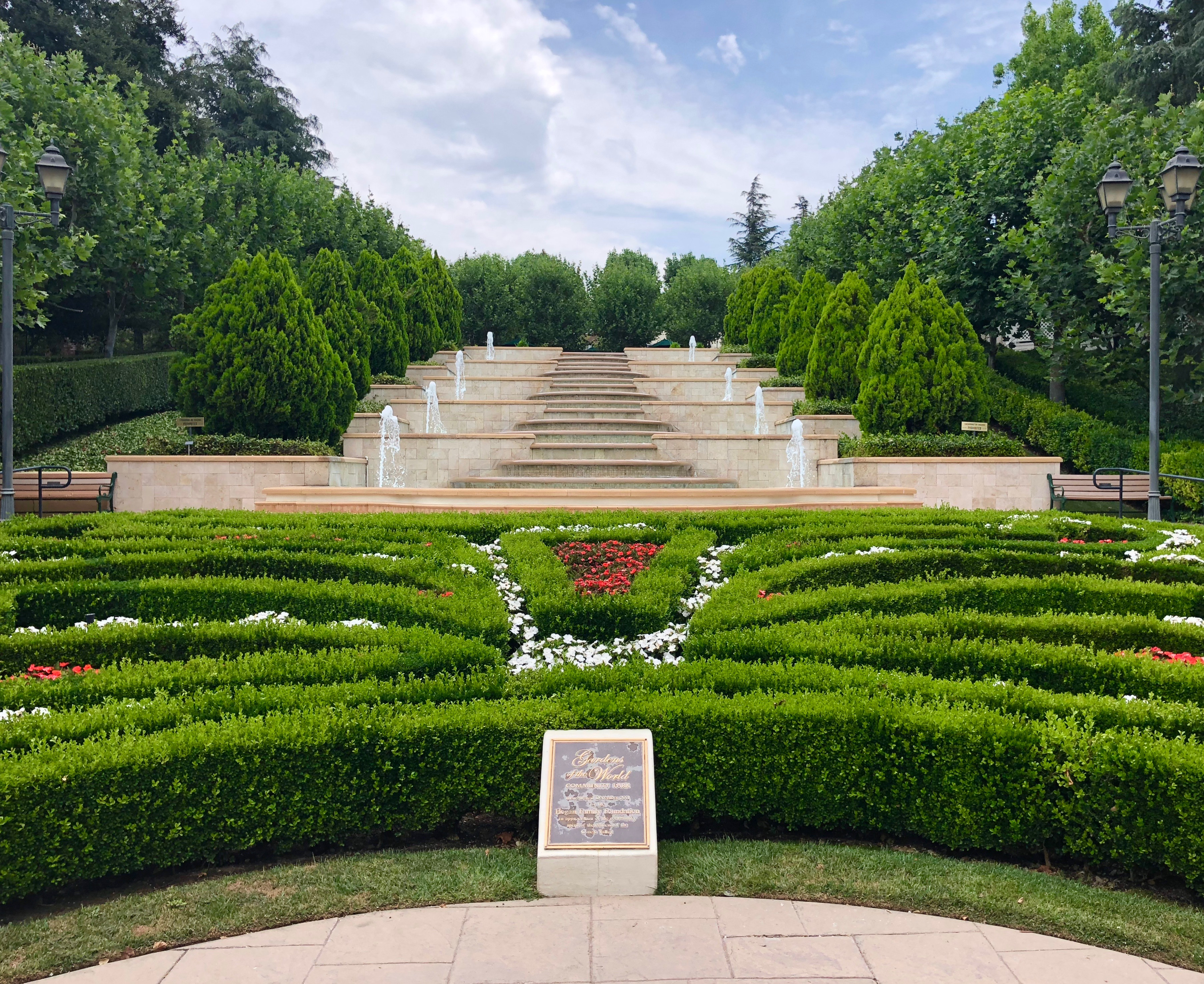
French waterfall at Gardens of the World.

- American Radio Archive, museum dedicated to the history of radio
- California Lutheran University (Pederson House and Water Tower)
- California Museum of Art (CMATO), art museum at The Oaks mall (now closed)
- Chumash Indian Museum, museum with a replica of a Chumash village
- Conejo Valley Art Museum, art museum at Janss Marketplace
- Conejo Valley Botanic Garden, 33-acre botanical garden
- Conejo Valley High: oldest continuously used public landmark in Conejo Valley (aka Timber School)
- Dawn's Peak, locally known as Tarantula Hill, the highest point in Thousand Oaks
- Gardens of the World, botanical garden featuring flora from various countries
- Joel McCrea Ranch, listed on the U.S. National Register of Historic Places
- Oak Creek Canyon Whole Access Interpretive Trail, 0.4-mile trail with guide cable and braille signs describing the oak grove's flora and fauna
- Satwiwa Culture Center, Chumash museum at the foothills of Mount Boney
- Sherwood Country Club, host of Tiger Woods' World Challenge from 2000 to 2013
- Stagecoach Inn, historic hotel in Newbury Park
- The Oaks Shopping Center, largest shopping mall in Ventura County
- Thousand Oaks Civic Arts Plaza, home to City Hall, Fred Kavli Theatre, and Janet and Ray Scherr Forum
- Thousand Oaks Community Gallery, art gallery adjacent to Newbury Park Library
- Thousand Oaks Library, the largest library in Ventura County
- Wildwood Regional Park, a 1,765-acre (714 ha) regional park

== Sports ==
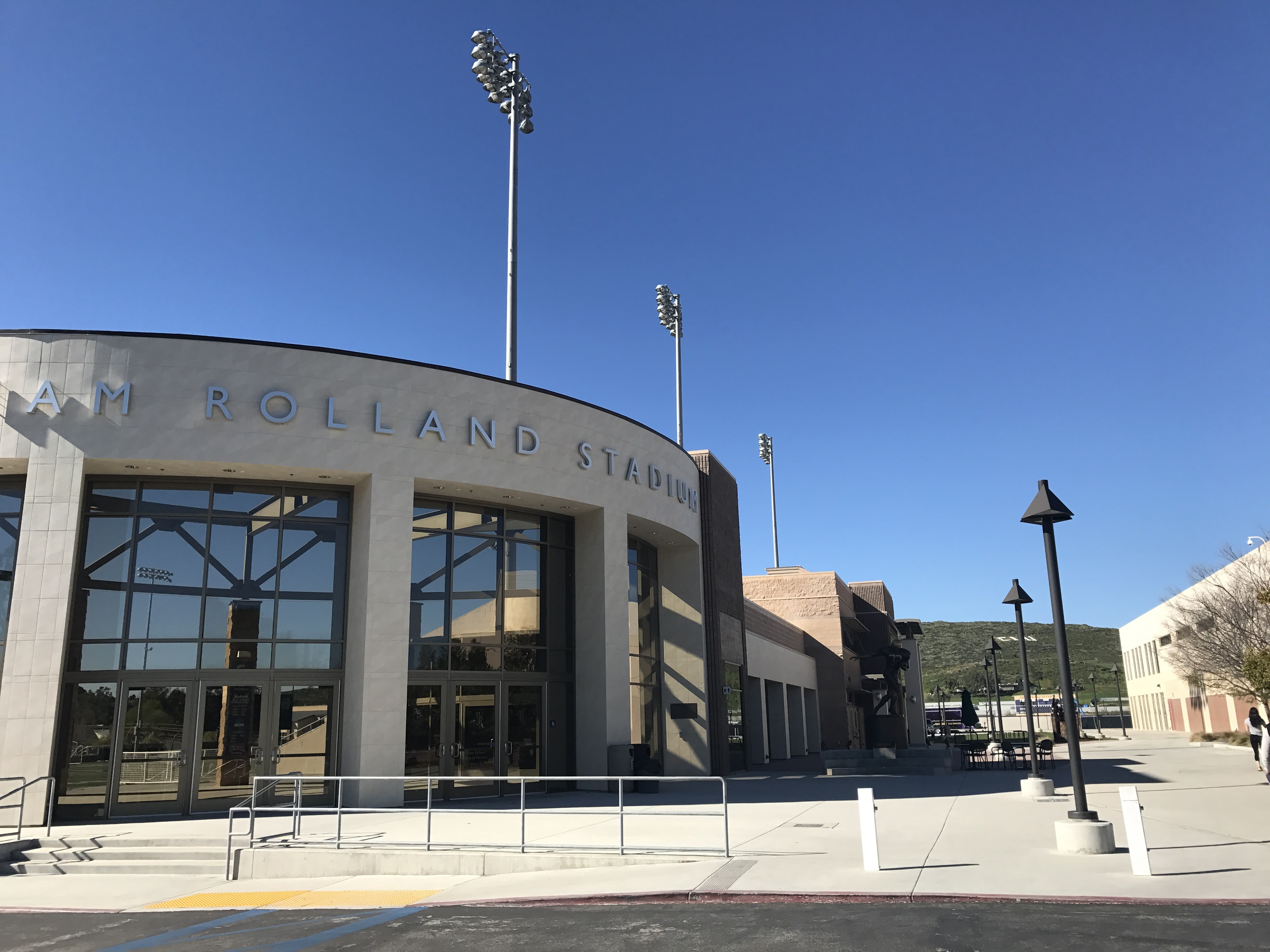
Ventura County FC play at California Lutheran University (CLU).

The city is home to Ventura County FC, a professional soccer team in MLS Next Pro, who play at William Rolland Stadium on the campus of California Lutheran University (CLU). They are affiliated with LA Galaxy of Major League Soccer, and currently operate as their reserve side.

The Conejo Oaks collegiate baseball team previously played in Thousand Oaks at Sparky Anderson Field. The Ventura County Outlaws are a rugby union team competing in the Southern California Rugby Football Union, based in Thousand Oaks.

Los Angeles Lightning was a local basketball team based at Gilbert Sports and Fitness Center at Cal Lutheran. CLU also served as the official training site of the 2008 and 2012 US Olympic Men's Water Polo teams. A nearby company, DesignworksUSA in Newbury Park, has designed the U.S. Olympic Team's bobsleds. Furthermore, Newbury Park has been the location of several Tour of California, a professional cycling race.

AYSO, club soccer (such as Apex Soccer Club, Newbury Park Soccer Club and Conejo Valley United), Conejo Youth Basketball Association, Conejo Valley Thunder Wrestling, Pop Warner football, Little League baseball, CYFFA flag football, girls' softball, organized swim team leagues, ice hockey, and even organized lacrosse, rugby and field hockey have active programs.

The city is home to the Sherwood Country Club, a golf course designed by Jack Nicklaus. The annual Chevron World Challenge golf tournament hosted by Tiger Woods took place at the course from 2000 to 2013.

=== Professional football ===
For 27 years, California Lutheran University hosted the training camp for the Dallas Cowboys. The final camp was held in 1989. The CLU football practice field used by the Cowboys as well as the CLU Kingsmen football team was replaced by a large sports complex in 2006. The Cowboys Clubhouse in Thousand Oaks still stands across from the complex, and is currently a family residence. The Los Angeles Rams headquarters and practice facilities were located at CLU until the team moved to its headquarters to Woodland Hills.

=== Baseball ===
In August 1994, a team from Thousand Oaks Little League became the first Little League team in Ventura County to win a World Championship, winning the Junior League World Series championship game 20–3. In 1996, a Senior Division (ages 14–16) Thousand Oaks Little League team won a National Championship. Two years later in 1998, a Big League Division (ages 17–18) Conejo Valley Little League team won a World Championship, defeating a Venezuelan Team 10–9 in the Big League World Series and going 26–1 in tournament play. In 2006, Thousand Oaks won the World Championship in the Big League Division (ages 16–18) of Little League by defeating a team from Puerto Rico 10–0.

The Thousand Oaks Big League team were also World Series runners-up in 2003 and 2005. In 2007, they were United States runner-up. In 2009, they won the United States Championship and appeared on prime time on ESPN. In the summer of 2004, the Little League National Championship team hailed from Thousand Oaks. The Conejo Valley East team of 11- and 12-year-olds went 22–0 in local, regional, and World Series tournaments play claiming the national title at the 2004 Little League World Series in Williamsport, Pennsylvania before losing in the international title game to the team from Curaçao, Caribbean.

== Parks and recreation ==
The city is known for its open space nature preservation, combating urban sprawl with 1/3 of the city having been permanently saved from development. The open space system contains about 150 miles of multipurpose hiking, biking and equestrian trails that provide recreational opportunities for all ages. In 1996, the American Hiking Society and National Park Service recognized this trail system by presenting the city with the Trail Town USA Hall of Fame Award. The city is also recognized by the National Arbor Association as a Tree City USA.

== Government ==
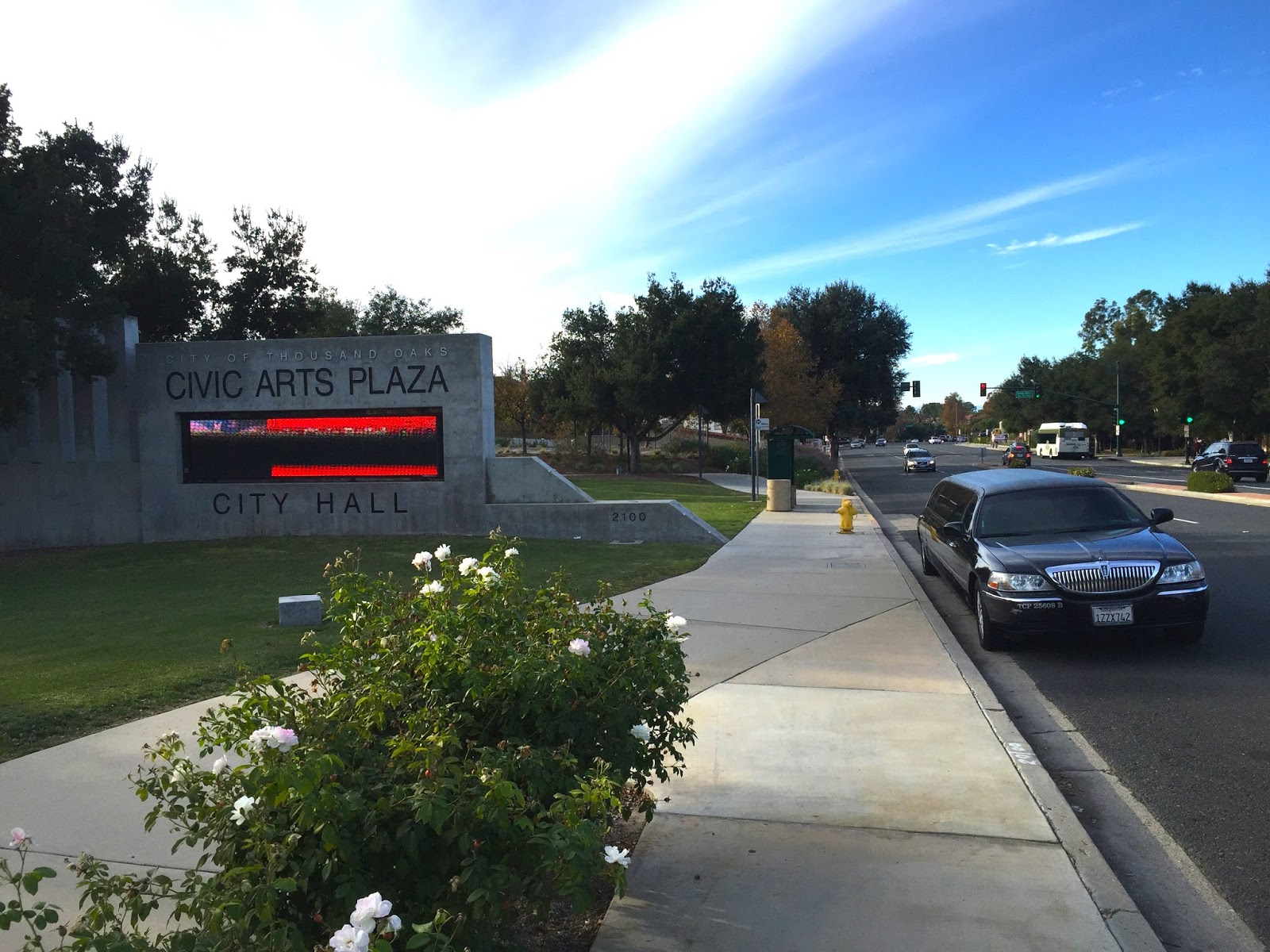
City Hall is housed at Thousand Oaks Civic Arts Plaza.

Thousand Oaks does not directly elect its mayor; instead, council members take turns rotating into the position.

The city council has five members: a mayor, a mayor pro tem and, three councilmembers.

Position	Name
Mayor	Mikey Taylor
Mayor Pro Tem	Bob Engler
Councilmember (District 4)	Al Adam
Councilmember (District 5)	Connie "Tie" Gutierrez
Councilmember (At-large)	David Newman

According to the city's most recent (2019) Comprehensive Annual Financial Report Fund financial statements, the city's various funds had $175.9 million in revenues, $169.8 million in expenditures, $1.01 billion in total assets, $176.3 million in total liabilities, and $27 million in investments:

The structure of the management and coordination of city services is:

Department	Director
City Manager	Andrew Powers
City Attorney	Tracy Noonan
City Clerk	Laura Maguire
Cultural Affairs	Jonathan Serret
Community Development	Kelvin Parker
Finance	Jamie Boscarino
Fire	John Spykerman
Human Resources	Tim Giles
Library Services	Melissa Hurtado
Police	Jeremy Paris
Public Works	Clifford Finley

Established in 1964, the City Manager's post is charged with coordinating City Council policies and direction, and provides overall management administration of the city's ten departments. Administrative tasks are performed with assistance of four professional and three clerical staff members, including the Assistant City Manager, which serves in a key position. A major responsibility for the City Manager is the development of the annual city budget.

As a chief legal advisor to the city, the City Attorney provides assistance and advice to all city departments and commissions. The attorney also represents the city in legal matters. The City Clerk's responsibilities include conducting elections, maintaining the custody of official city codes and records, administrating the oath of office given to elected officials, receiving legal claims, issuing marriage licenses, and receiving passport applications.

Elected officials are very aware of the anti-growth sentiment that is common among the residents. All new development is described as slow-growth in order to be accepted by the community. Ordinances protect oak trees and the city prioritizes planting more in street medians and other public land. More than 15,000 acres (61 km^{2}) have been preserved as open space, containing more than 75 miles (121 km) of trails. Open space has been acquired through land dedications by developers, purchase, and conservation easements. Donations of open space have been made by Bob Hope and Joel McCrea. The largest donor has been the Prudential Company which developed the community of Westlake and eventually gave more than 3,000 acres (1,200 ha).

=== Political strength ===
Thousand Oaks city vote by party in presidential elections
Year	Democratic	Republican	Third Parties
2024	55.18% 39,082	42.02% 29,742	2.76% 1,958
2020	56.78% 43,330	41.22% 31,455	2.00% 1,523
2016	52.04% 33,431	42.31% 27,173	5.65% 3,626
2012	46.14% 28,995	51.70% 32,491	2.16% 1,355
2008	50.58 32,886	47.85% 31,112	1.57% 1,022
2004	43.68% 26,892	55.33% 34,063	0.99% 611
2000	42.74% 23,200	53.62% 29,109	3.64% 1,974
1996	38.91% 18,582	50.15% 23,946	10.64% 5,225
1992	38.91% 17,219	40.14% 21,005	26.95% 14,101
1988	31.11% 14,648	67.79% 31,923	1.10% 517
1984	23.96% 10,205	75.05% 31,965	0.99% 421
1980	22.30% 7,504	67.67% 22,777	10.03% 3,373
1976	35.56% 7,964	62.95% 14,096	1.49% 334
1972	27.10% 5,028	68.96% 12,800	3.95% 733

Thousand Oaks and neighboring Simi Valley had traditionally been strongholds for the Republican Party in Ventura County. In 2007, Thousand Oaks had three registered Republican voters for every two Democrats. 45.8% of voters were registered Republicans in 2008. But by 2018, the party registrations for Thousand Oaks residents were 38% Republican, 33.7% Democrat, and 25% no preference, with the remainder split among other parties. In the 2008, 2016, 2020, and 2024 presidential elections, the Democratic Party nominees Barack Obama, Hillary Clinton, Joe Biden, and Kamala Harris received a majority of the vote in Thousand Oaks.

Thousand Oaks is located adjacent to Simi Valley, often nicknamed "Reagan Country", where the former president is buried at the Ronald Reagan Presidential Library near the Thousand Oaks border. During the 1980 presidential election, Reagan returned to Thousand Oaks Boulevard (then Ventura Boulevard).

Presidents George H. W. Bush, Gerald Ford and Ronald Reagan have held speeches at California Lutheran University, while President George W. Bush visited Newbury Park in 2003. The Republican Club at California Lutheran University has gained national prominence by having "the highest ratio of club members to number of students of any College Republican club in California."

== Education ==
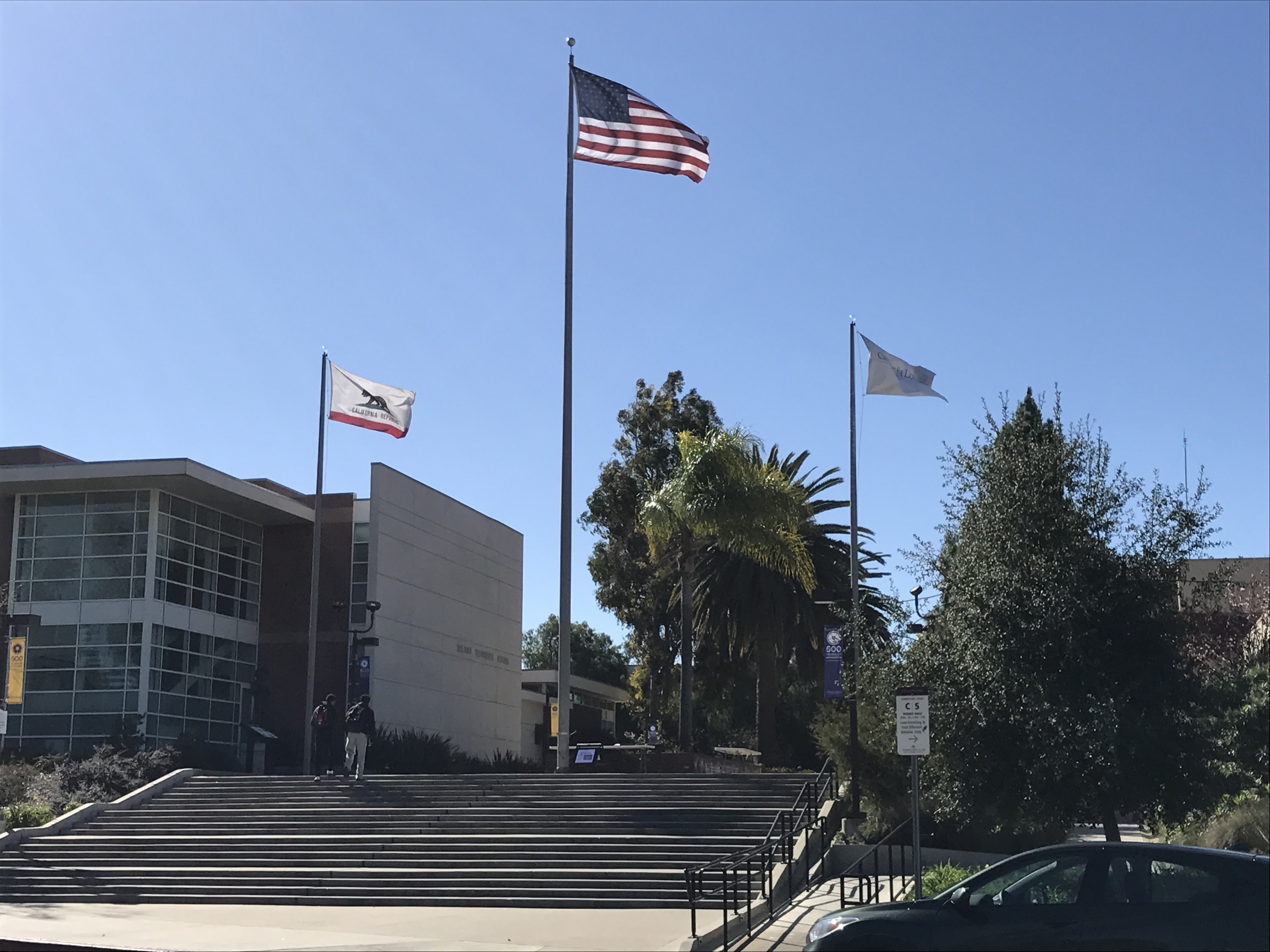
California Lutheran University has been rated the 14th best regional university in Western United States.

Thousand Oaks is served by the Conejo Valley Unified School District. Academic scores in public schools are high. Several schools are scoring in the top ten percent of schools in California. It includes numerous elementary schools, Colina Middle School, Redwood Middle School, Los Cerritos Middle School. The high schools of the area include Thousand Oaks High School, Newbury Park High School, and Westlake High School. Also part of the school district are Sycamore Canyon Middle School and Sequoia Middle School, located in Newbury Park. Oaks Christian High School, while located immediately outside Ventura County, matriculates numerous students from the county. Ascension Lutheran School is located in Thousand Oaks, and serves students from prekindergarten through eighth grade. La Reina High School is a private Roman Catholic, all-girls junior/senior high school.

The Thousand Oaks Library system is consistently ranked as one of the best public libraries in California. The library consists of the Grant R. Brimhall Library in Thousand Oaks and the Newbury Park Branch Library in Newbury Park. A 22,000-square-foot (2,000 m^{2}) children's library was added to the existing 62,000-square-foot (5,800 m^{2}) main building in June 2006. The children's library expansion resulted in an improved children's services area, a 3800-gallon, salt-water aquarium; quiet study rooms; a technology training room; a children's programming room; and additional seating and shelving capacity for both the children's services area and adult services area. Both the main library and Newbury Park Branch offer free wireless Internet access.

For over ten consecutive years, California Lutheran University has been ranked among "Top 25 Universities in the Western United States" by U.S. News & World Report published by America's Best Colleges Guide. It was ranked 14th as of 2018.

== Media ==
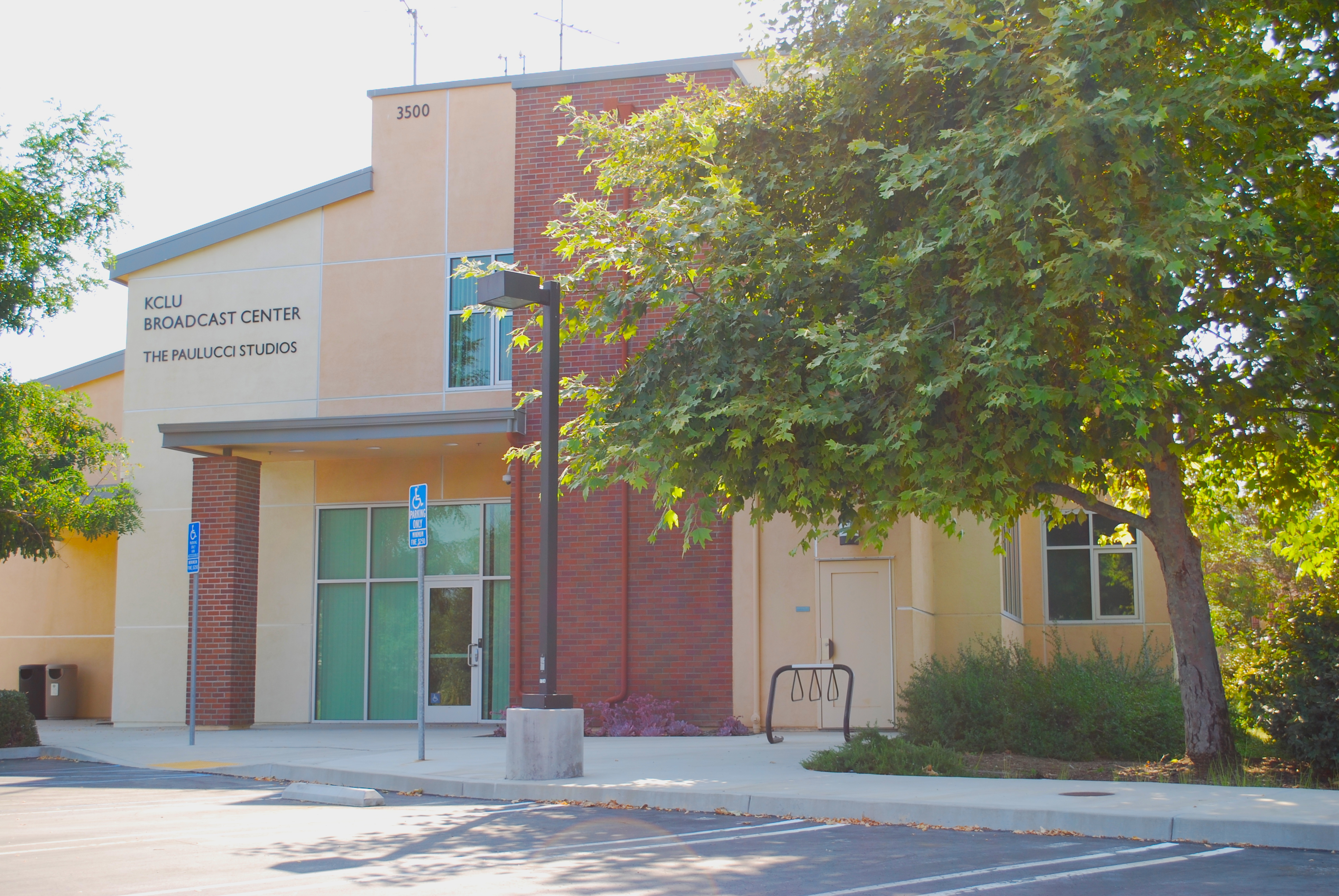
KCLU at California Lutheran University is the only public radio station in Ventura County. Thousand Oaks is also home to iCLU Radio, a student run radio station on the campus of California Lutheran University.

The Acorn is the main newspaper covering Thousand Oaks, Newbury Park, and Westlake Village. The Ventura County Star is a larger regional newspaper covering Ventura County. Los Angeles Times circulations increased after the newspaper began covering the Conejo Valley in 1987.

Thousand Oaks is home to a few radio station transmitter sites as well including KCLU-FM, an NPR radio station based at California Lutheran University. Other radio station transmitters located in Thousand Oaks include KDSC (the repeater for Los Angeles' KUSC) airing classical music on 91.1, KYRA airing EMF's Christian rock, Air1 on 92.7, and K280DT, a translator of KOST-FM Los Angeles, airing adult contemporary music.

Thousand Oaks TV is a 24-hour cable TV station established by the city in 1987. Besides KCLU-FM, another student media outlet at California Lutheran University is The Echo, a news outlet.

The first newspaper, Oaks Post, was published during the 1940s. Conejo Valley News was established in 1954, while Village Chronicle was established in 1959. Thousand Oaks Journal was another early local newspaper in the 1960s. Former Newbury Park newspapers have included the Newbury Star in the 1960s, Our Town U.S.A., and The Newburian, which was published by Newbury Park Adventist Academy. Newbury Park Reporter was a local edition of the Star Free Press.

=== Movies and television series filming ===
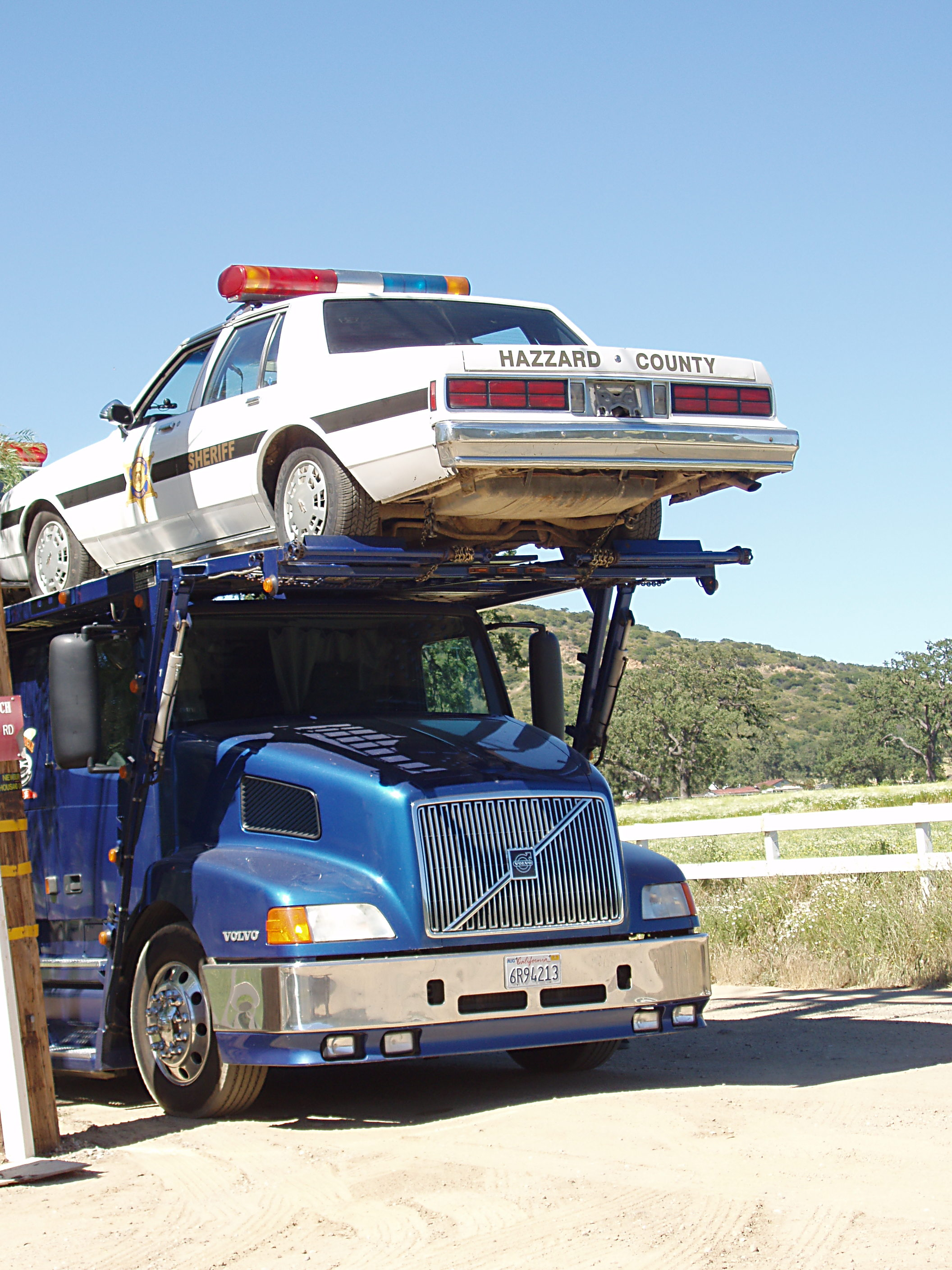
Sheriff's car from Dukes of Hazzard (2005) at the shooting location off Potrero Road.

Due to the temperate climate and its location just inside the studio zone, a number of movies and television series have been filmed in Thousand Oaks. Thousand Oaks Boulevard can for instance be seen in the Oscar-winning film It Happened One Night (1934), while Dean Martin and Jerry Lewis stop at a service station on Live Oak Street in Hollywood or Bust (1956). Hills near California Lutheran University were used in the filming of Welcome to Hard Times (1967). Spartacus (1960) was also filmed by CLU. Movies are still being made at Ventura Farms (previously Deerwood Stock Farm), Greenfield Ranch, and the JMJ Ranch.

A number of movie productions took place in Wildwood Regional Park between the 1930s and 1960s. Examples include Wuthering Heights (1939), Dodge City (1939), The Rifleman (1958–63), Davy Crockett, King of the Wild Frontier (1955), The Grapes of Wrath (1940), Duel in the Sun (1946), Bonanza (1963–73), The Big Valley (1965–69), Gunsmoke (1955–75), Wagon Train (1957–65), Clearing the Range (1931), Flaming Frontier (1958), The Horse Soldiers (1959) starring John Wayne, Roustabout (1964), and Flaming Star (1960) .

Greenfield Ranch appeared as a zoo in We Bought a Zoo (2011). The ranch has previously been featured in films such as Down Argentine Way (1940), Heart and Souls (1993) and Bitter Harvest (1993). It has also been seen in TV-series such as True Blood (2008–2014), Monk (2002–2009), Bones (2005–2017) and Criminal Minds (2005–2020). A Hidden Valley home was also used in the filming of It's Complicated (2009) starring Meryl Streep.

Other films include Memoirs of a Geisha (2005), Come On, Tarzan (1932), The Adventures of Robin Hood (1938), To the Shores of Iwo Jima (1945), Lassie Come Home (1943), The Guns of Will Sonnett (1967–69) and The Dukes of Hazzard (1979–85).

== Infrastructure ==
=== Transportation ===
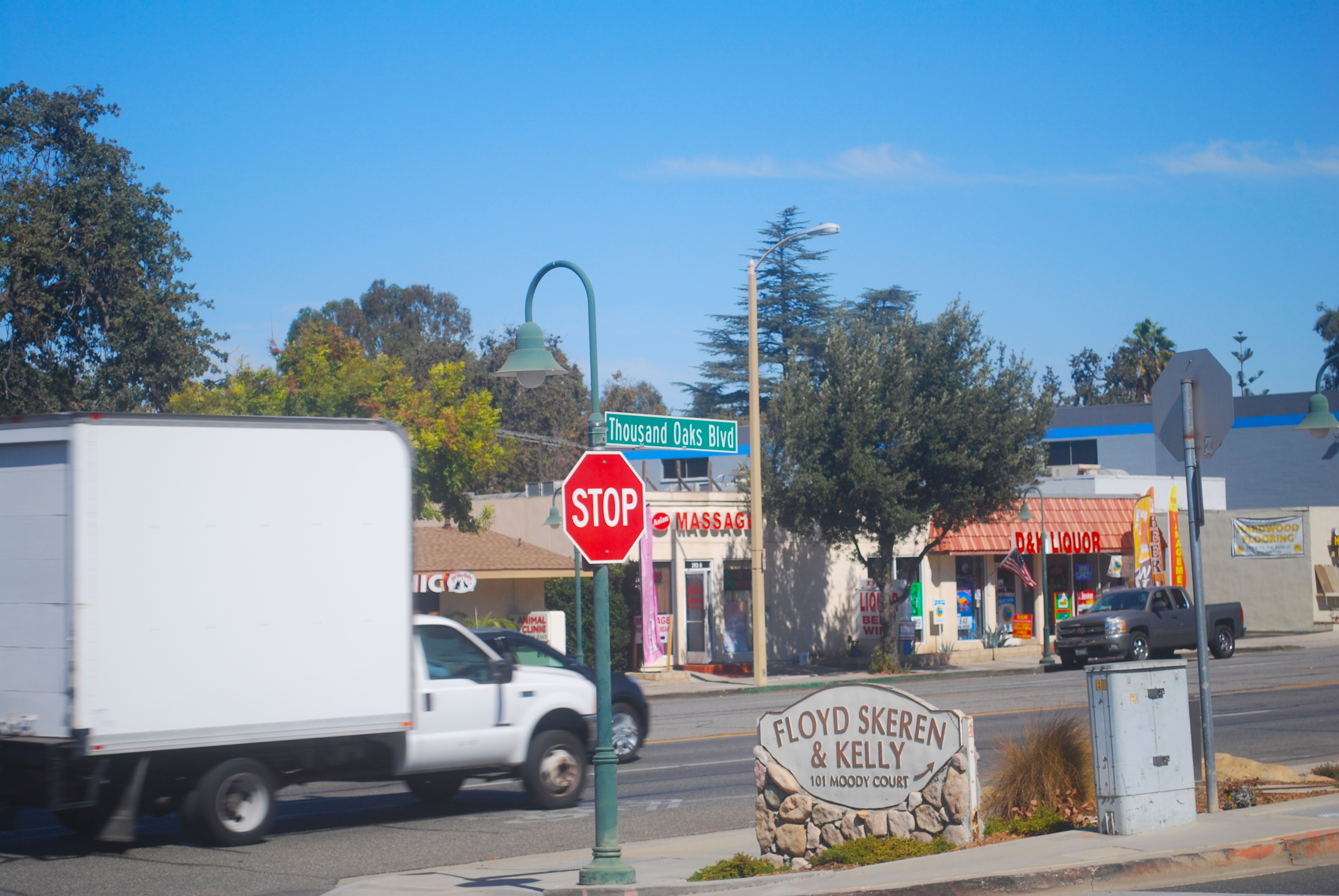
Thousand Oaks Boulevard.

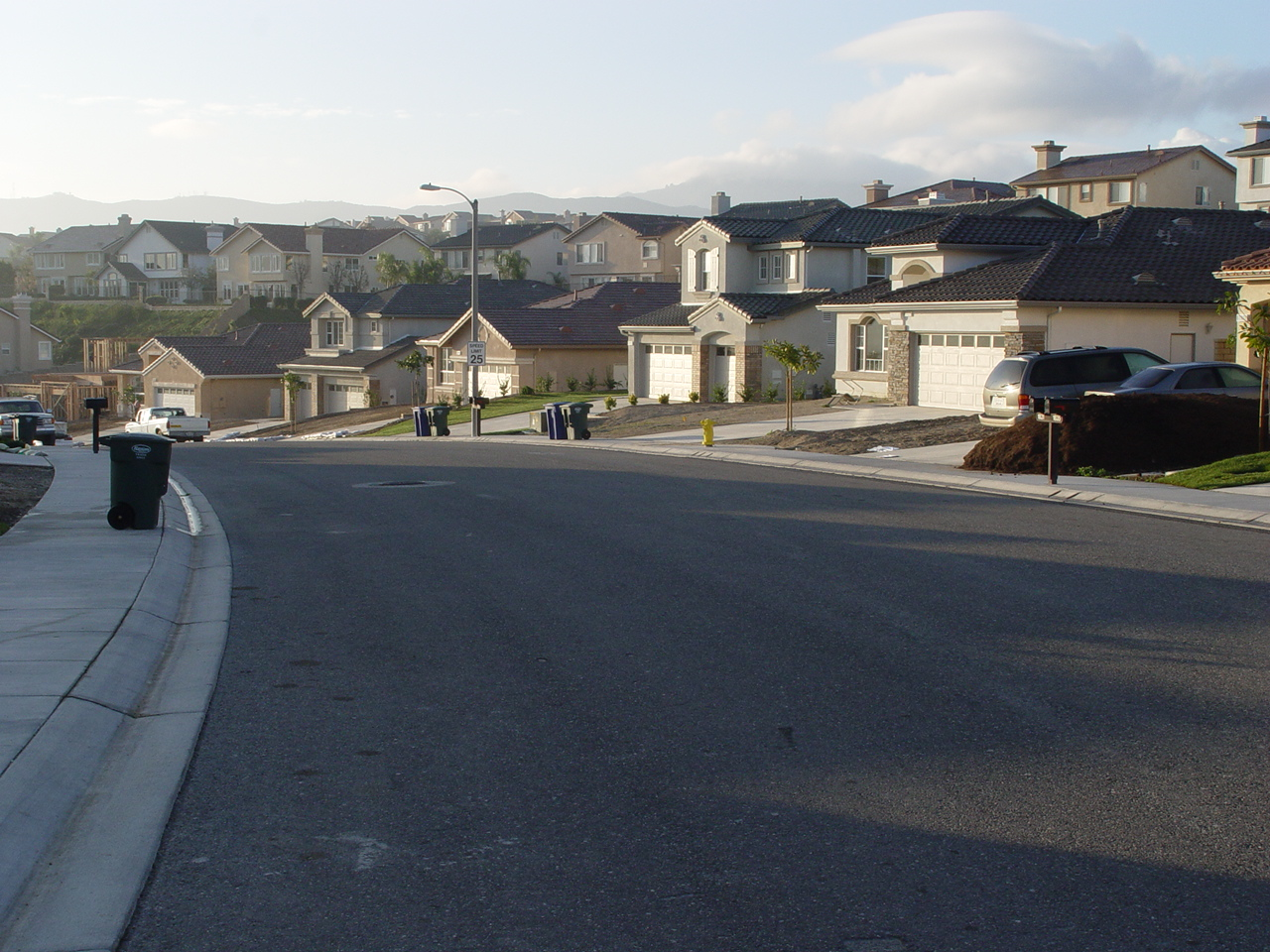
A neighborhood in Thousand Oaks.

==== Roads ====
Thousand Oaks lies in the heart of the Conejo Valley, with the city of Los Angeles to the east and the city of Ventura to the west. The city is served by U.S. Route 101 (the Ventura Freeway), as well as State Route 23 (the Moorpark Freeway). Highway 101 runs through the city and connects it with Los Angeles and Ventura. Highway 23 connects to the 101 near downtown Thousand Oaks, runs north toward Moorpark.

==== Public transportation ====
Thousand Oaks is served by Thousand Oaks Transit, which provides public transportation in the form of shuttles and buses. TOT buses provide service to Thousand Oaks as well as some neighboring communities.

A regional transportation center provides bus and shuttle lines to Los Angeles, Oxnard, Ventura, Moorpark, Simi Valley, and Santa Barbara via the VISTA, Metro, and LADOT Commuter Express bus lines. In addition to being a transfer station from Los Angeles and other nearby cities, it also serves as the primary station for Thousand Oaks Transit buses. Metrolink Ventura County and Pacific Surfliner services are available at the train stations in Moorpark and Camarillo. The Amtrak Coast Starlight stops at the Oxnard Transit Center and the Simi Valley Amtrak/Metrolink Station.

==== Air ====
Commercial air travel is provided primarily by Los Angeles International Airport for regular commuters, while the Bob Hope Airport (in Burbank) offers an alternative for domestic destinations. Thousand Oaks offers public transportation that runs to both airports, via the VISTA, Metro, and LADOT bus lines. Los Angeles International Airport is approximately 40 miles (64 km) southeast of the city, while Burbank Airport is approximately 35 miles (56 km) east of the city. General aviation airports include Camarillo Airport, approximately 15 miles (24 km) west of the city; Oxnard Airport, approximately 25 miles (40 km) west of the city in Oxnard, California; and Van Nuys Airport, 25 miles (40 km) east of the city.

Conejo Valley Airport, also known as Janss Airport, was an airport in Thousand Oaks. It had the first qualified flying field in the Conejo Valley, and was opened sometime between 1946 and 1949 by the Janss Corporation, which had large land holdings in the area. The airport had 2,800 feet of unpaved runway, located parallel to Ventura Road, now known as Thousand Oaks Boulevard (near Moorpark Road). When the state established a highway through town in 1952, the airfield was moved to the south side of the 101 Ventura Freeway. The airport was often featured in movies, including Francis the Talking Mule (1950) with Donald O'Conner. Other movies filmed here include The Paleface (1948), Riders of the Whistling Pines (1949), and Overland Stage Raiders (1938).

The airport was no longer in use by 1962, and is the present location of Los Robles Greens Golf Course. The Janss Corporation later announced they would construct a new airport on the 1,400 acre Friedrich Ranch in Newbury Park, which they had purchased to develop the Rancho Conejo Industrial Park. Rancho Conejo Airport opened on May 5, 1960, and considered an executive airport. It had a 4,300-foot surfaced and lighted runway, and was described by the Los Angeles Times: "It was the finest executive aircraft facility on the West Coast... and will serve the needs of the fast-moving executives of the space-age industries." The airport was used in the filming of It's a Mad, Mad, Mad, Mad, World in 1963. The airport closed by 1965–66, and the land remained empty until 1991 when Shapell Industries constructed Rancho Conejo Village homes. The former site is northwest of the intersection of Lawrence Drive and Ventu Park Road in Newbury Park.

=== Water ===
Potable water is drawn from the state water system.

=== Fire department ===
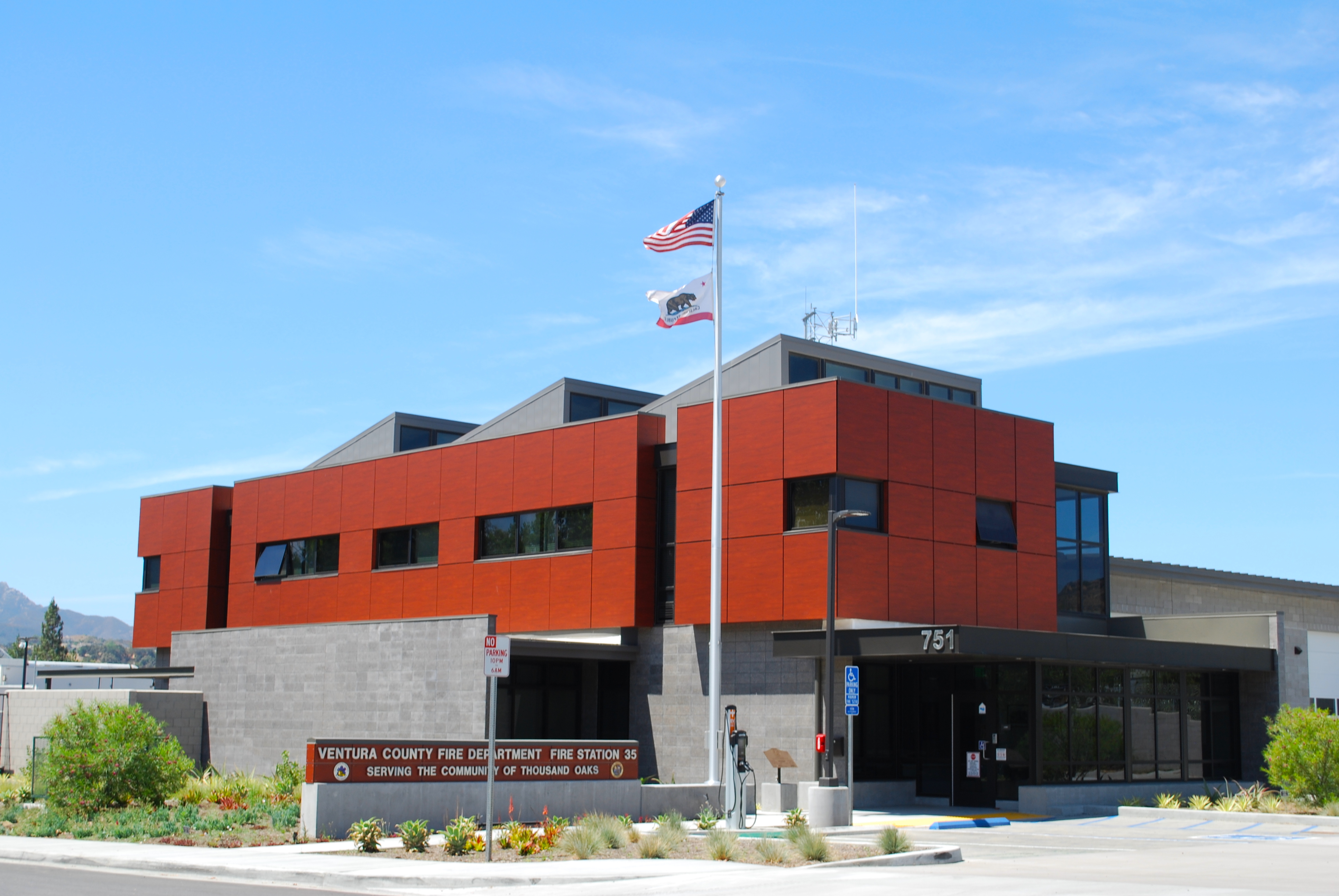
Fire Station 35 in Newbury Park opened in 2017 and replaced the 1962 station.

The Ventura County Fire Department provides fire protection and emergency medical services for Thousand Oaks and the surrounding areas.

Prior to the 1930s, fires were fought by local ranchers. Conejo Valley residents all signed a petition appealing for a truck. The request was presented to Ventura County Fire Warden, Walter Emerick, in April 1931. Louis Goebel, the owner of Goebel's Lion Farm, contacted the warden and wrote: "If you provide Thousand Oaks with a fire truck, I'll build a fire station for it and you can use it as long as you want." The offer was accepted and Goebel built a 22-by-50 ft. extension onto his main building. On the evening of March 28, 1932, Walter Emerick delivered the valley's first fire engine.

Tom Moody became the first Conejo Valley Fire Chief and established a temporary fire station in Lake Sherwood in 1942. Two permanent fire stations were built in 1949: one in Lake Sherwood and a new station at 67 Erbes Road which replaced the fire station at Goebel's Lion Farm. In 1961 Fire Station 34 was constructed followed by Station 35 in Newbury Park in 1962. Two stations were established to replace Station 31 on Erbes Road: Station 30 on Hillcrest Dr. (1974) and a new Fire Station 31 on Duesenburg Drive (1977). Fire Station 36 was built in 1985, followed by Station 37 in North Ranch in 2001.

Conejo Valley fire personnel work closely with their counterparts across the county border in Los Angeles County, and reciprocate their services both Ventura- and L.A. Counties.

=== Law enforcement ===
Thousand Oaks Police Department and Ventura County Sheriff's Office provide law enforcement services for the city. Thousand Oaks Police Department was established on July 1, 1965, nine months after the city was incorporated, and has contracted the sheriff's department to provide police service since inception.

The city's police department was instituted on July 1, 1965, with a personnel complement of twelve persons and two patrol vehicles. Captain T. Burt Stevens was the city's first Chief of Police. The police station was originally operated under contract with the Ventura County Sheriff's Department. Fifteen officers, a sergeant, and a station commander serving as police chief, began work officially on July 1, 1965. Prior to the new police station, the closest deputies were in the city of Ventura and had to make the far trek to the Conejo Valley when crimes occurred. A resident deputy had also been assigned to the valley prior to the new station, who received his calls out of the family home. When the police station was established, it was originally two patrol cars to cover the city. As of 1973, the police department was staffed by nineteen deputies from the Ventura County Sheriff's East Valley Station. There were four one-man patrol vehicles which were operated on 24-hour basis.

At first, the police station was housed in a room at the Park Oaks Fire Station, on the corner of Avenida de Los Arboles and Moorpark Road. As the officers soon outgrew the small room, the house across the street was rented and turned into a police station. The little house on Avenida de Los Arboles gave way to a professional sheriff's station, which was established on Olsen Road in 1969. It was replaced in 1988 with a more modern station, located just a half-mile down Olsen Road.

==== Highway honors officer ====
The portion of the Ventura Freeway that passes through the city has been named in honor of Ventura County Sheriff Sergeant Ron Helus, who was killed after entering the Borderline Bar & Grill to confront the perpetrator of a mass shooting event in November 2018.

=== Animal services ===
The city contracts with LA County Animal Care & Control.

== Notable people ==
- Sparky Anderson, MLB Hall of Fame baseball manager
- Eve Arden, actress
- Frankie Avalon, singer and actor
- Danny Barrera, soccer player
- Diego Barrera, soccer player
- Austin Block, ice hockey player
- Amanda Bynes, actress
- Belinda Carlisle, singer
- Richard Carpenter, musician
- Mike Curb, 42nd Lieutenant Governor of California
- Frances Dee, actress
- Ellen DeGeneres, television host
- Bob Denver, actor
- Aaron Donald, football player
- John Fogerty, musician, singer, songwriter
- Marcos Giron, tennis player
- Jared Goff, football player
- Wayne Gretzky, ice hockey player
- Jerry Heller, music executive
- Mariel Hemingway, actress
- Jack Kirby, comic book artist
- Alan Ladd, actor
- Cory Lerios, musician, member of the band Pablo Cruise
- Claire Liu, tennis player
- Edie Locke, fashion journalist
- Heather Locklear, actress
- Sophia Loren, actress
- Dean Martin, singer
- Ron Masak, actor
- Virginia Mayo, actress
- Joel McCrea, actor
- The Miz, professional wrestler
- Marilyn Monroe, actress
- Trevor Moore, ice hockey player
- Heather Morris, actress
- Olivia O'Brien, singer-songwriter
- Maryse Ouellet, professional wrestler
- Slim Pickens, actor
- Frances Prince, the city's first female mayor
- Mickey Rooney, actor
- Kurt Russell, actor
- Tom Selleck, actor
- Artie Shaw, musician
- Britney Spears, singer
- Sylvester Stallone, actor
- Hailee Steinfeld, actress
- Donna Summer, singer
- Thomas Tull, film producer
- Robert Urich, actor
- Frankie Valli, singer and actor
- Robert Wagner, actor
- Richard Widmark, actor
- Christian Yelich, baseball player
