= Conejo Valley Botanic Garden =

Botanic garden in Thousand Oaks, California

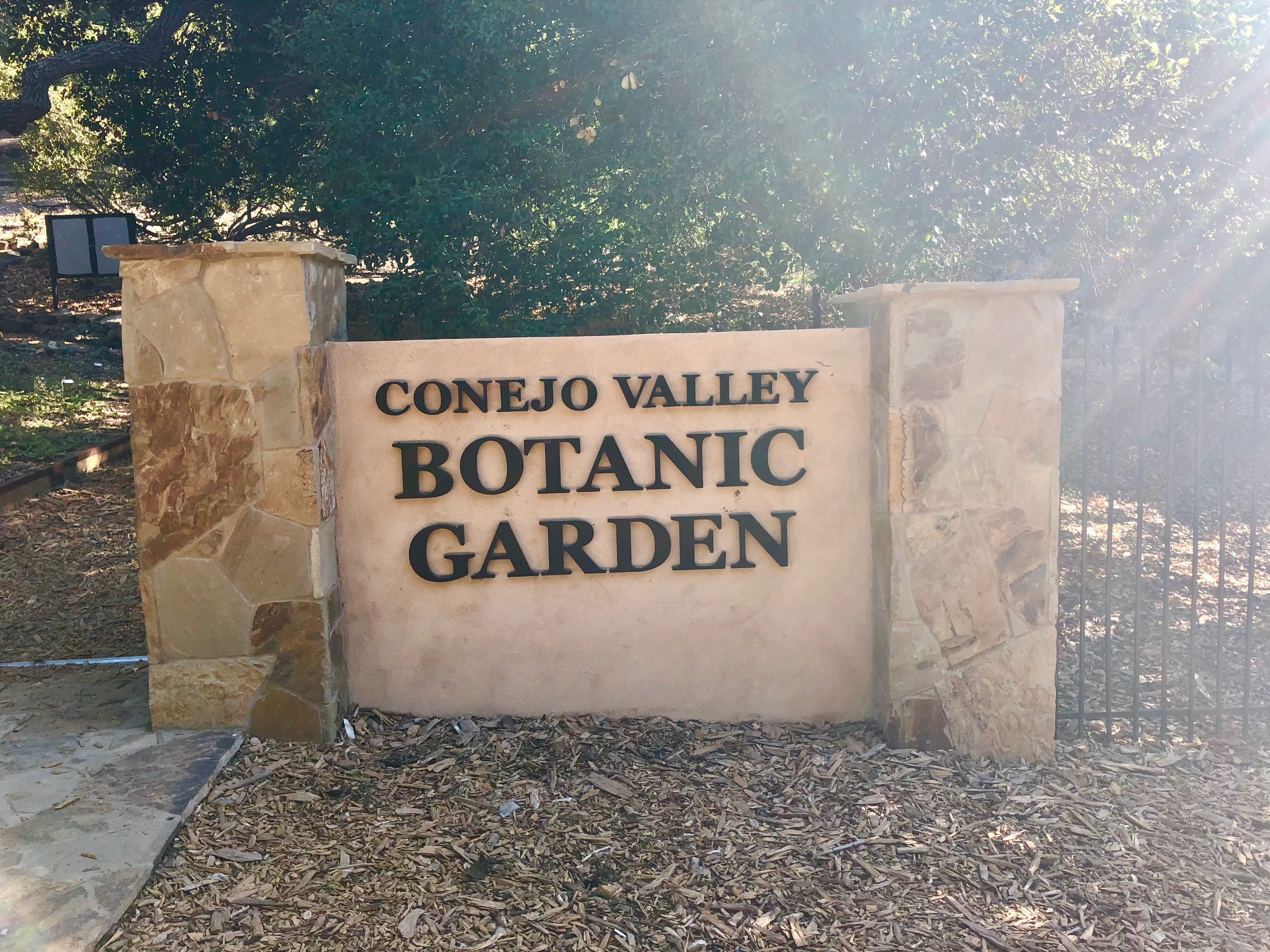
- Sign by entrance.

- Location within California Location within the United States
- Type: Botanical garden
- Location: Thousand Oaks, California, United States
- Coordinates: 34°11′31″N 118°53′09″W
- Area: 33.6 acres (13.6 ha)
- Opened: 1976
- Operator: Conejo Valley Botanic Garden
- Status: Open
- Website: www.conejovalleybotanicgarden.com

Conejo Valley Botanic Garden is located in Thousand Oaks, California, and consists of a peak with vista views along with 15 hillside botanical gardens. It provides a teaching laboratory for what flora works and what does not work in the Conejo Valley.

The 33-acre (13-hectare) site consists of a vast variety of endemic plants, water-conserving plants, oak trees, and indigenous wildlife. A children's garden area was added in March 2003, known as Kids’ Adventure Garden. Although the garden itself keeps open most days, Kids’ Adventure Garden and nursery plant sales are only open on certain days. Admission to the garden is free.

Although its main entrance is found at 400 West Gainsborough Road, it is also accessible from Conejo Community Park, located at the intersection of Hendrix and Dover Avenues.

The property was first acquired in 1973, while the first parts of the botanical gardens began to emerge in 1976. It is operated by the nonprofit Conejo Valley Botanic Garden, Inc. It lies across the street from Tarantula Hill, the highest point in Thousand Oaks.

== Overview ==
It consists of a plant sanctuary on a hill overlooking the Conejo Valley. The hill contains 15 unique, hillside specialty gardens. It is home to a variety of hiking trails, which interconnect with other paths leading to various overlook points from the hill. The garden's many hill paths lead past fruit trees, sections of desert, native plants, Mediterranean plants, herbs, and a butterfly garden. The 1-mile Nature Trail follows a creek, which descends into a forested, willow- and oak-filled canyon. It is also home of a bird habitat that is a conservation effort to provide sustenance and sheltering environments for birds and other fauna.

== Management ==
A 50-year lease agreement between the Conejo Valley Botanic Garden Inc. and Conejo Recreation & Park District was signed on October 18, 1973, with the organization paying $1 annually in rent. A term of the lease requires the garden to not charge for entry. The organization receives no funding from public agencies and remains exclusively dependent on donations.

== Specialty gardens ==
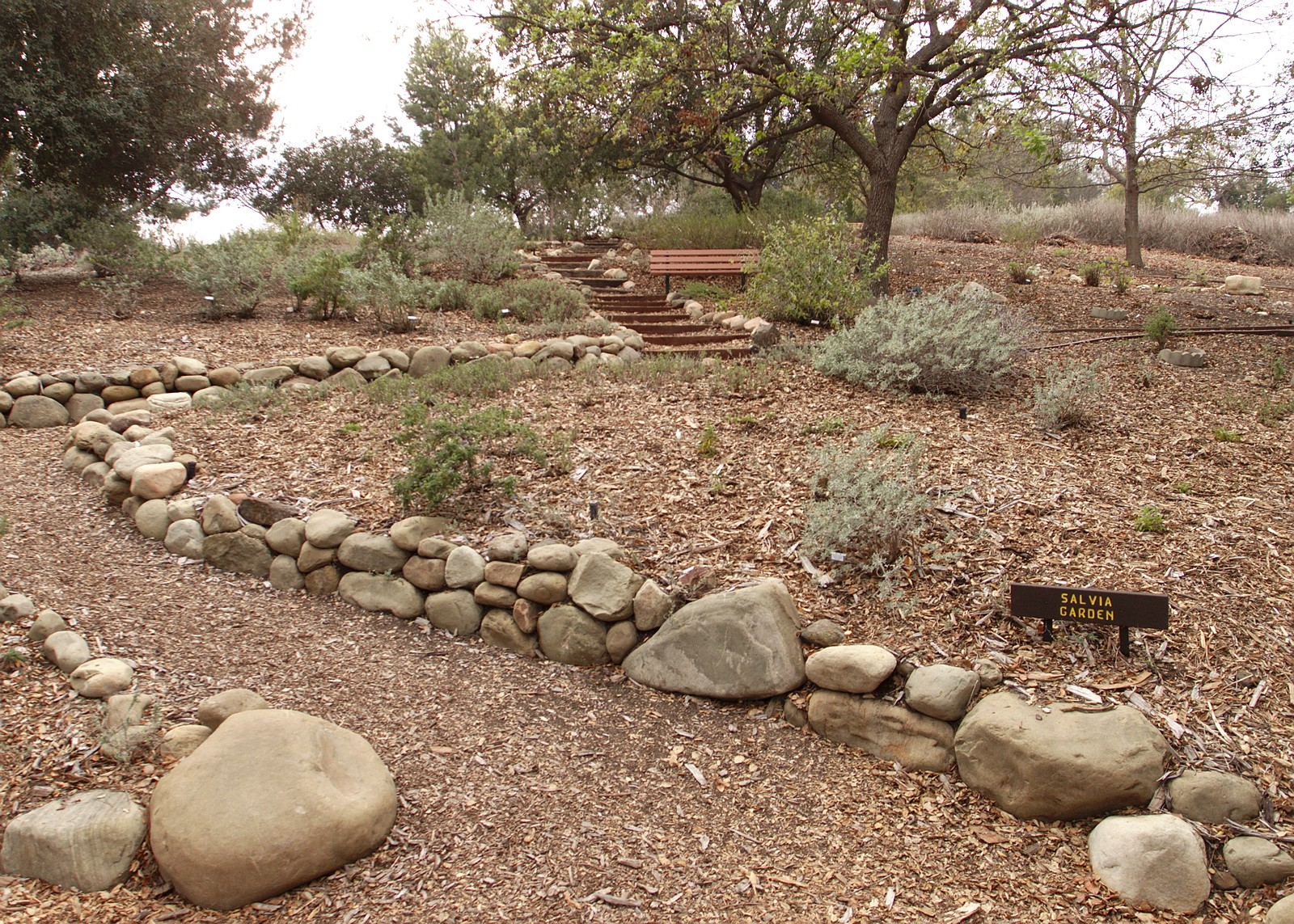
Salvia Garden

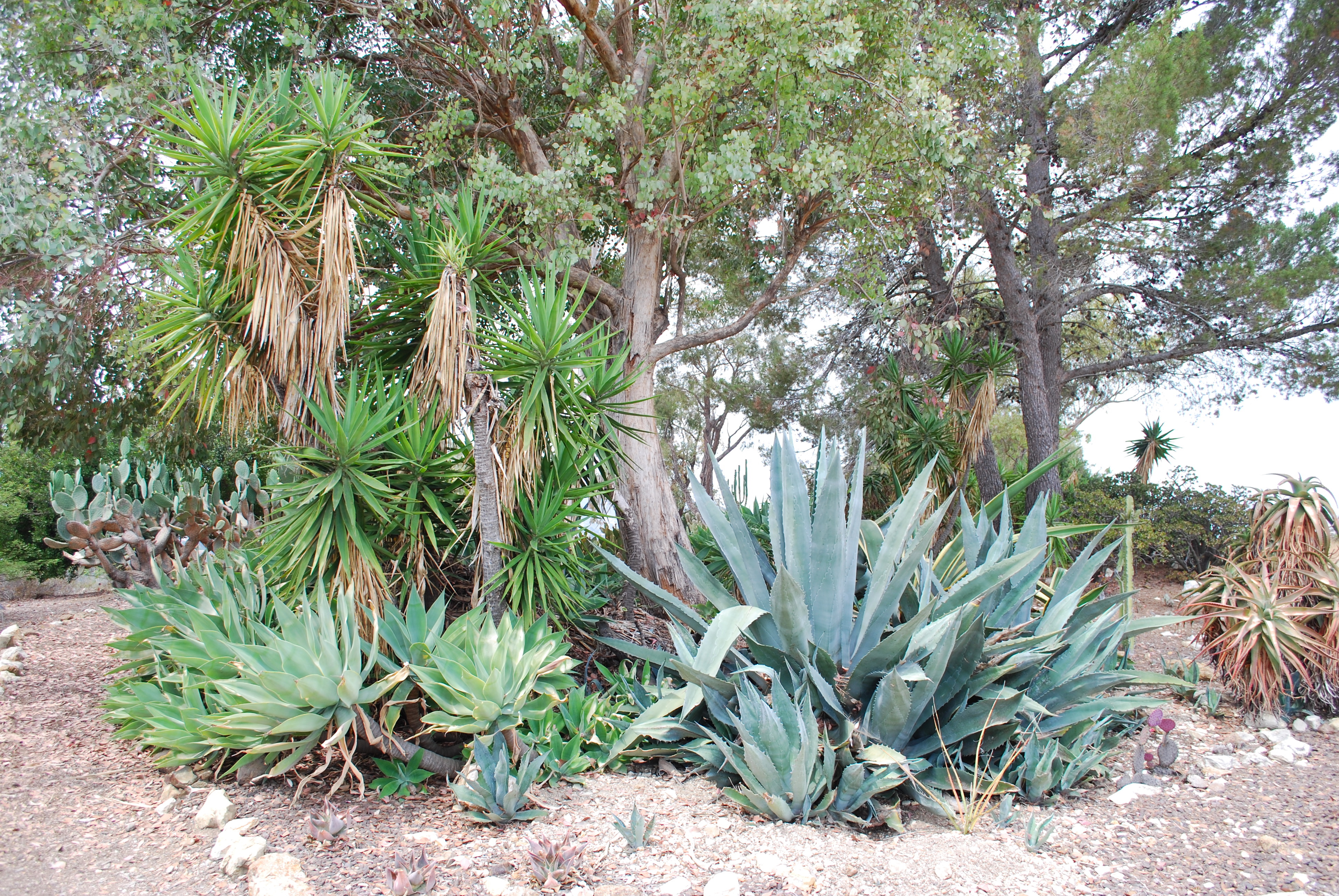
Desert Garden

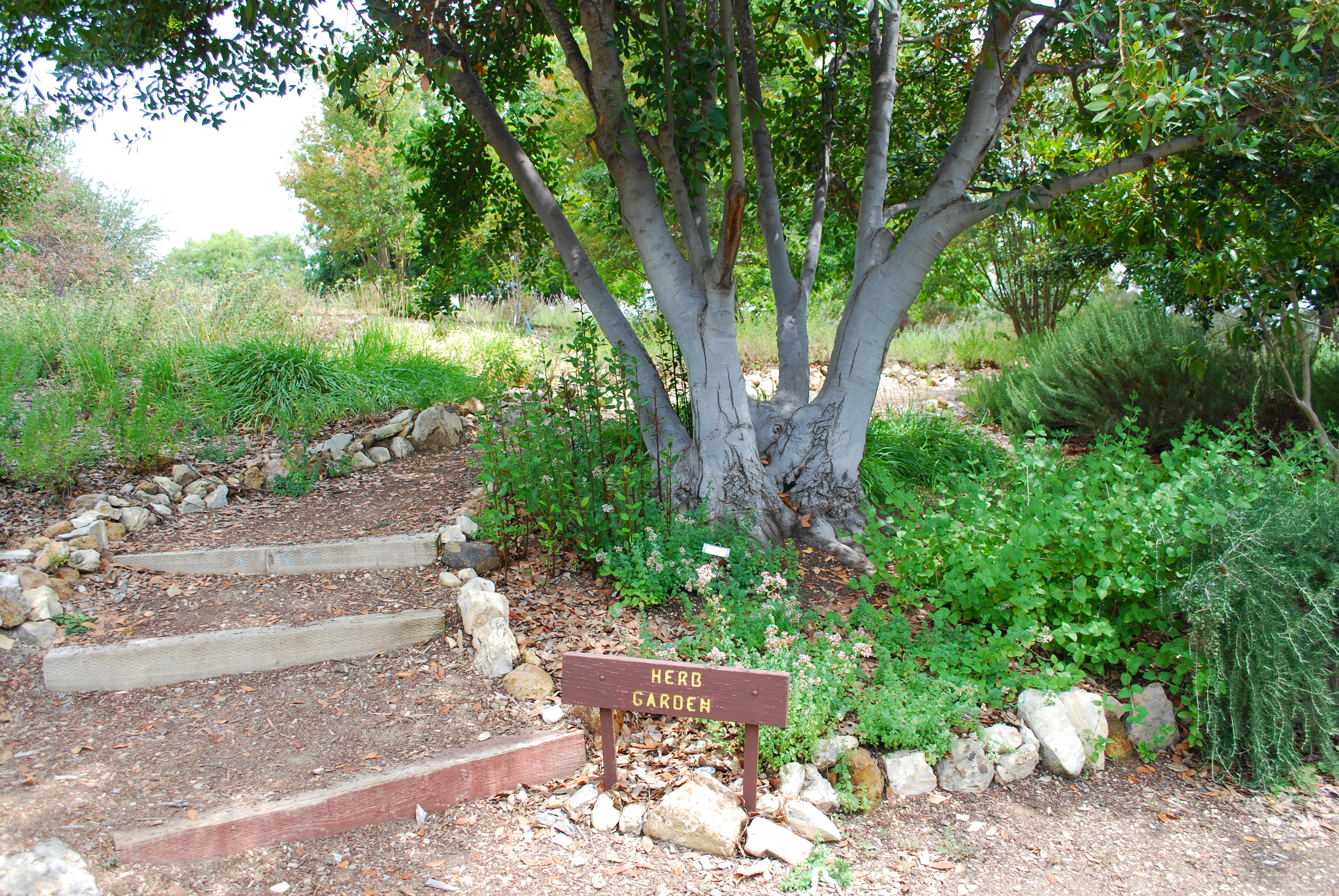
Herb Garden

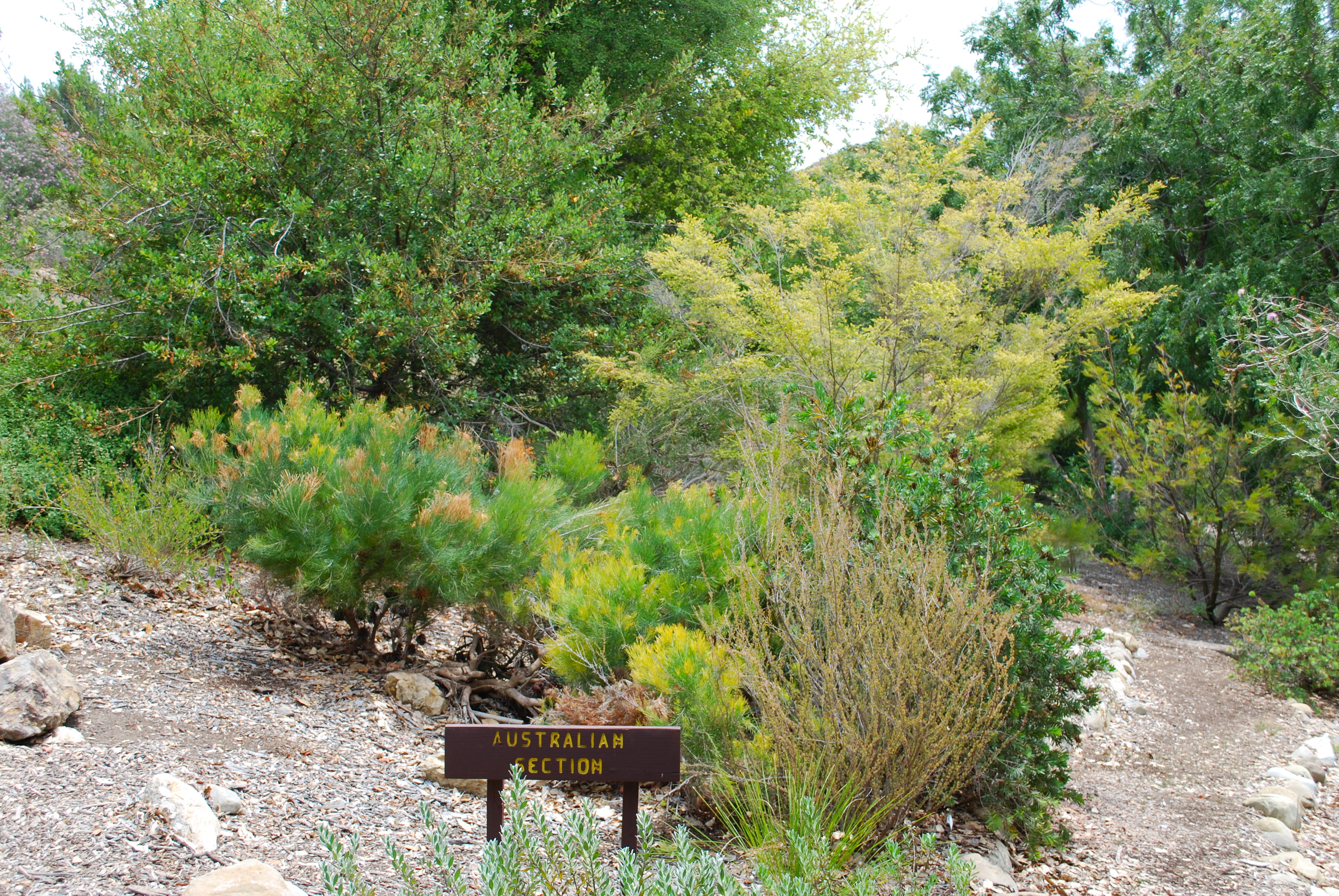
Australian Garden

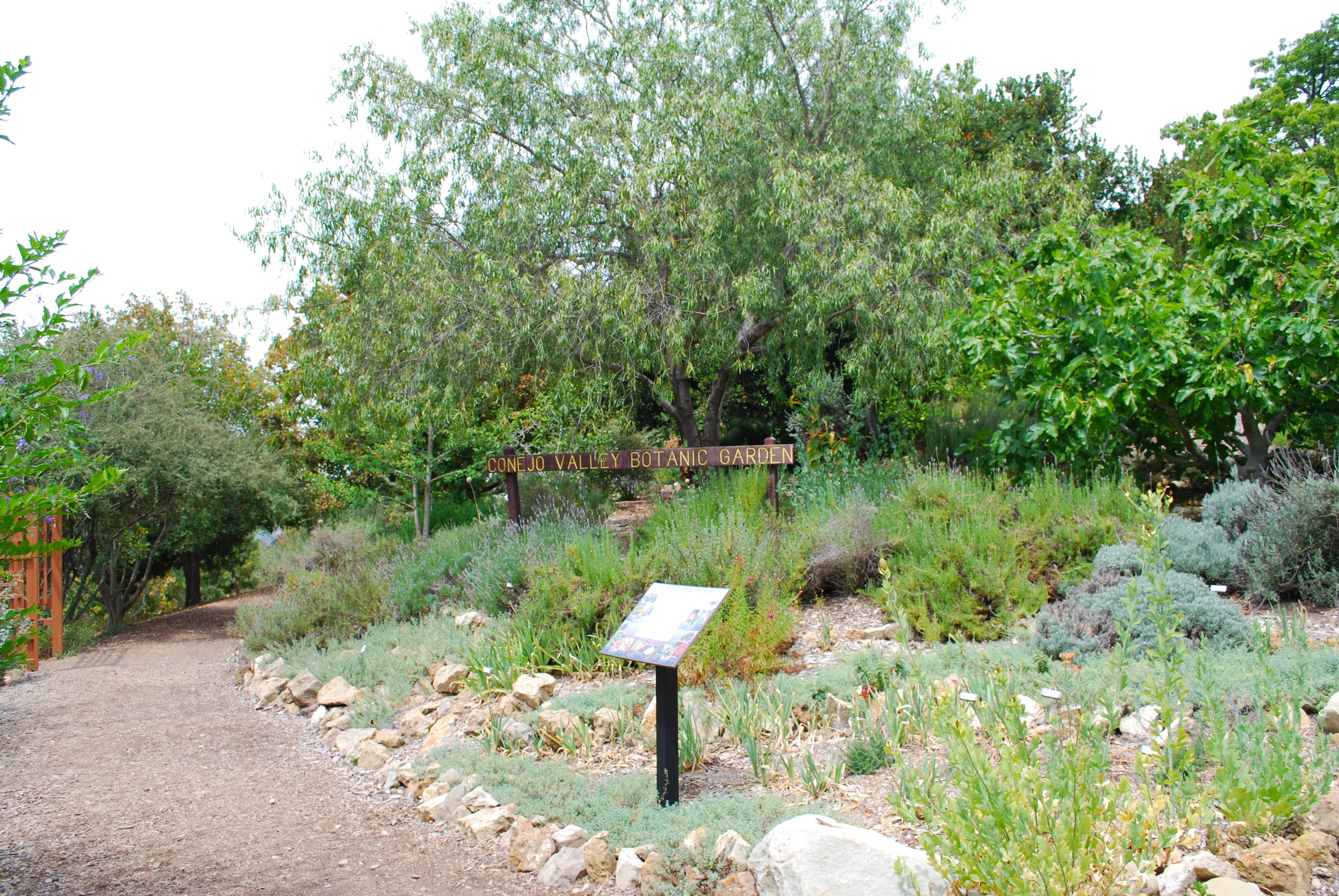
Mediterranean Garden

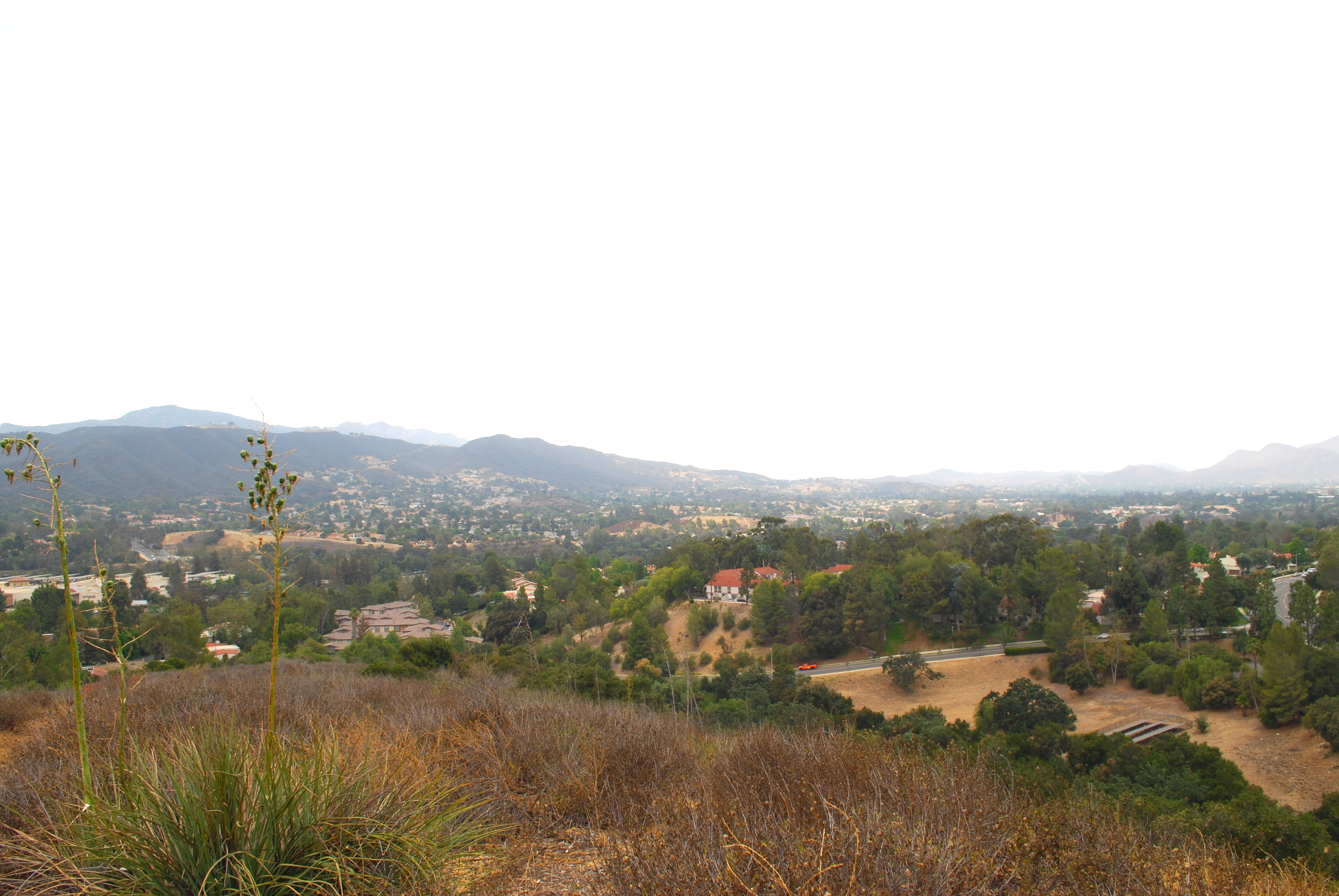
View from atop the hill

Its botanical gardens include an Australian garden, a bird habitat, a butterfly garden, an oak-tree grove, rare-fruit orchard, extensive salvia collections, and more.

Its botanical gardens consist of 15 unique hillside gardens:

- The Native Plant Garden and Native Meadow feature species native to California, including shrubs, flowers and trees. It includes species such as Santa Cruz Island Ironwood and California holly, which gave Hollywood, CA its name. Also in this garden is a tree of the world's tallest tree species, namely the Coast redwood from Northern California, and also the biggest tree species in the world, Giant sequoia redwood.
- Lillian's Meadow showcases perennials, trees, and shrubs that thrive with minimal water. The Penstemon collection provides colorful flowers throughout the year. The garden is a visual guide to low-maintenance native species with natural landscaping.
- The Salvia Garden depicts Salvia which require little water. Many of the world's 750 species of Salvia are represented, including ten California natives. The Salvias represented are in a variety of colors, shapes, and fragrances. It has a vast number of Salvia iodantha.
- The Butterfly Garden provides nectar and other food sources for butterflies and caterpillars. The garden provides species that serve the needs of butterflies, including a variety of plants with varied bloom periods. A sign lists commonly observed species: Monarch, Western Tiger Swallowtail, Anise Swallowtail, Mounrning cloak, Marine blue, Fiery Skipper, Funereal Duskywing, Cabbage White, Gulf Fritillary, and Painted Lady.
- The Mediterranean Garden contains species from five countries that share the Mediterranean climate.
- The Herb Garden exhibits an extensive collection of aromatic-, kitchen-, and medicinal herbs. Included are visual and aromatic tea and mint herbs. There is also a planting of “legendary herbs” at the site.
- The Bird Habitat contains a water source and species that provide a year-round food source for avifauna. Work began on the garden in 1996 and it occupies one-third of an acre. The habitat attracts local- and migratory birds. Year-round bird species present include oak titmouse, mourning dove, Western scrub-jay, lesser goldfinch, black phoebe, California towhee, northern mockingbird, house finch, and spotted towhee.
- The Australian Garden features an extensive collection of species from Australia, including tree species such as Red Flowering Gum, Coolgardie gum, Illawarra flame tree, Rock Thryptomene and Australian silver oak. Plants include Pink Melaleuca, Red and Green Kangaroo Paw, among others.
- The Desert Garden is located near the hilltop and exhibits desert trees and succulents such as cacti, euphorbias and aloes. Some are native to Southern California, while others are endemic to Mexico, South Africa, and other desert regions of the world. Some species represented are Ponytail palm, Foxtail, Silver dollar plant, Jade plant, and a 7–8 feet tall Barbary fig.
- The Tranquility Garden was planted in Japanese garden style and showcases California native species. It was developed and dedicated in 1997.
- The Rare Fruit Orchard showcases a large variety of fruit trees. Installed by the California Rare Fruit Growers, the garden exhibits 130 trees including 40 species from 35 countries. Some species include a Nectarine Panamint, Black Mulberry, Strawberry Guava, Black Mission Fig, and a Kodota Fig.
- Sage Hill features over one hundred native plant species. The top of the hill features panoramic views of the entire Conejo Valley, including panorama views of Thousand Oaks, Newbury Park, the Simi Hills and the Santa Monica Mountains.
- Kids’ Adventure Garden has a tree house, zoo garden, dinosaur topiaries, fun paths, and creek access.

Furthermore, the Trail of Trees exhibits 72 trees, including 50 tree species. Each tree is labeled with its family, botanical and common names, along with country of origin and planting date. Represented are the golden trumpet tree, the national tree of Brazil, as well as Chinese pistache, tulip tree, Prunus serrulata 'Kanzan', cockspur coral, American storax, shoestring acacia, and others.

Garden trails are found throughout the gardens. Little Loop Trail leads above the creek through chaparral and around a meadow. The longer, 1-mile (1.6 km) Nature Trail follows the creek and descends into a shady, oak-canopied canyon just below the hill with the botanical gardens. After 1/4 mile (0.40 km), steep wooden steps bring the path down into the canyon. After exploring the creek-bed for 1/2 mile (0.80 km), the trail climbs out of the ravine and returns to the main garden area.

== See also ==
- Gardens of the World
- List of botanical gardens in the United States
