= Joel McCrea Ranch =

- U.S. National Register of Historic Places
- U.S. Historic district
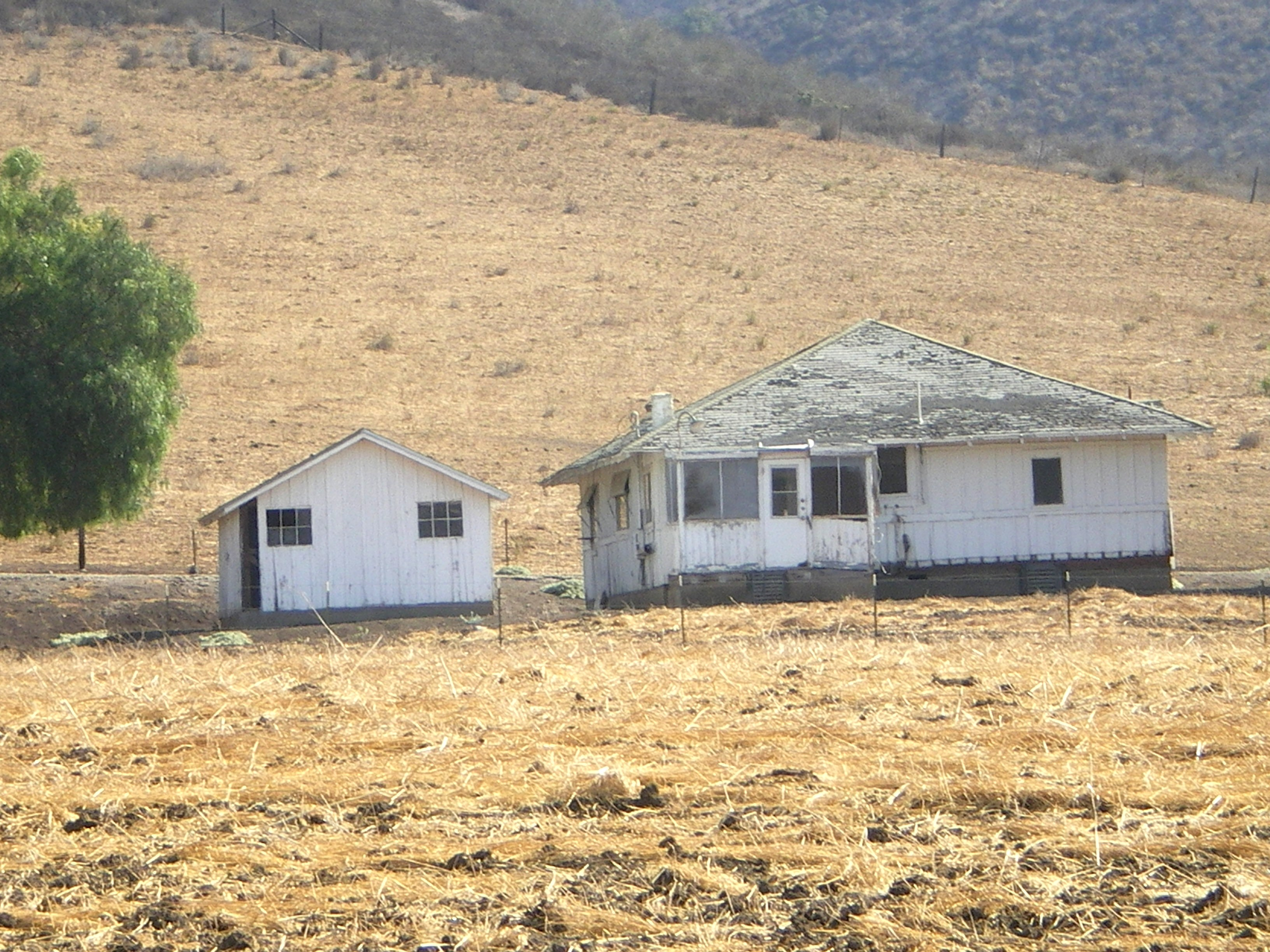
- Two unidentified lesser buildings, perhaps non-contributing ones
- Location: 4500 N. Moorpark Rd., Thousand Oaks, California
- Coordinates: 34°14′39″N 118°51′10″W
- Area: 220 acres (89 ha)
- Built: 1933
- Built by: Winget, Glenn O.
- Architect: Byers, John
- Architectural style: ranch style
- NRHP reference No.: 97000295
- Added to NRHP: April 18, 1997

The Joel McCrea Ranch in Thousand Oaks, California is also known as the August DuMortier Ranch. The ranch is a rare surviving example of the large cattle ranches and fields of grain which once dotted the Santa Rosa and Conejo valleys in eastern Ventura County.

Listed on the National Register of Historic Places in 1997, the site includes eight contributing buildings and four contributing structures on over 220 acres (89 ha). One surviving building dates from 1890 from August DuMortier's ranch; the main house, an avocado-shaped pool, and a cabana/poolhouse were built in 1933; a maid's residence and various other contributing and non-contributing buildings date from later.

== History ==
The ranch is historically significant for its association with actor Joel McCrea, a major star in the movie industry. The main house and some other buildings are also significant works of architect John Byers; according to the NRHP nomination:

Byers was a prominent regional architect, best known for his adobe and Spanish Colonial Revival designs. The Joel McCrea ranch house is a rare and very successful departure from Byers' usual period revivalism into the realm of the informal California Ranch style, just emerging in Southern California.

The ranch is at the bottom of the Norwegian Grade, a road built by settlers around 1900. The Norwegian Colony, at the north end of the Conejo Valley, needed a safe route to transport bales of hay and sacks of wheat and barley to the Oxnard Plain. This road allowed grain bound for San Francisco and England pass down the Santa Rosa Valley to the Hueneme Wharf.

The McCreas donated several hundred acres of the ranch to the newly formed Conejo Valley YMCA for the city of Thousand Oaks, California, both of which celebrated their 40th anniversaries in 2004. The Conejo Recreation and Park District took ownership of the ranch in 2004.

== See also ==
- National Register of Historic Places listings in Ventura County, California
