= Pederson House and Water Tower =

Ventura County Historic Landmark in Thousand Oaks, California

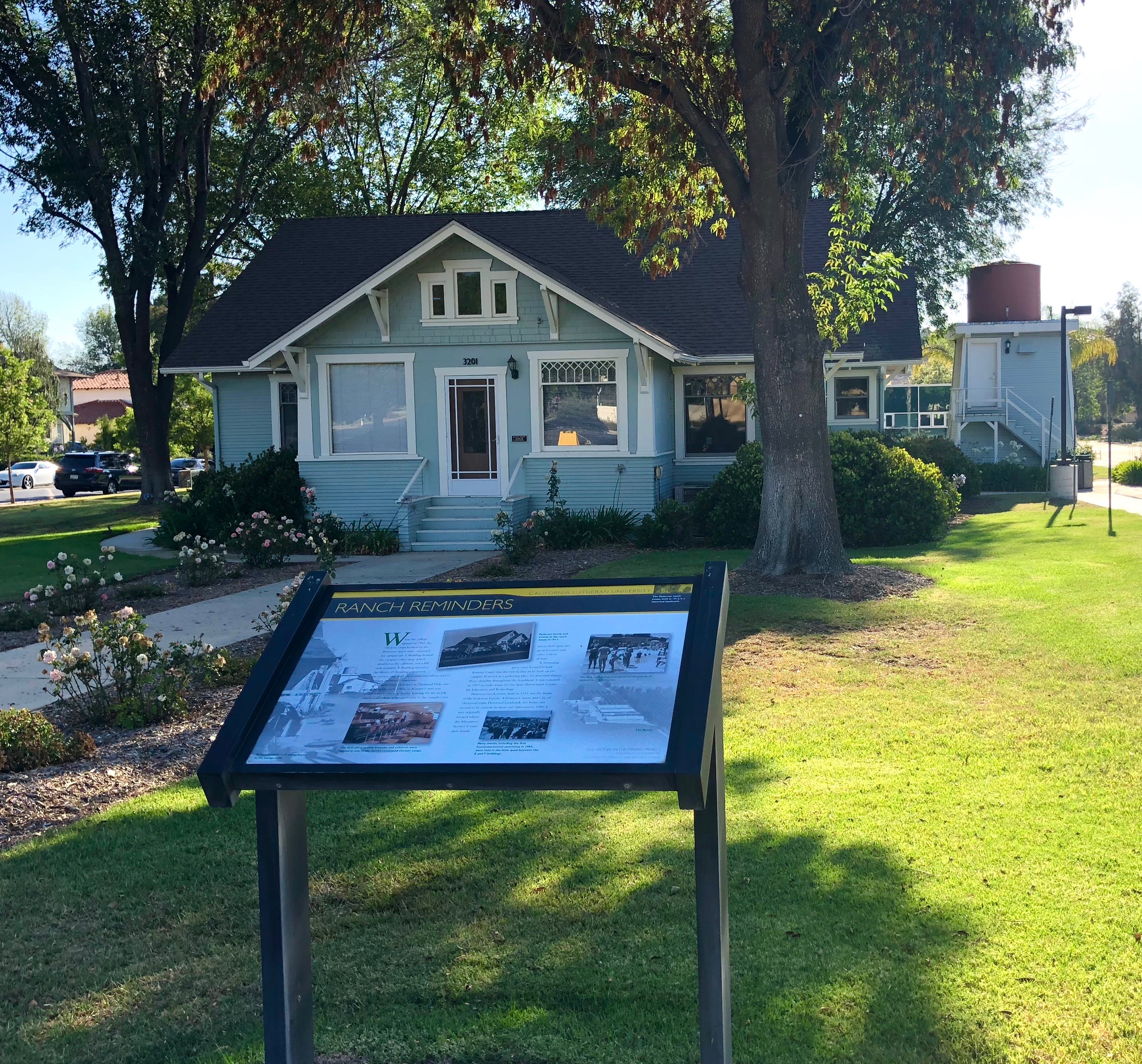
- Interactive map of the Pederson House and Water Tower area

General information
- Architectural style: American Craftsman
- Location: 3201 Regent Avenue, Thousand Oaks, CA
- Coordinates: 34°13′16″N 118°52′39″W
- Completed: 1923
- Owner: California Lutheran University

Design and construction
- Architect: Norwegian Colony

Pederson House and Water Tower is located at the campus of California Lutheran University (CLU) in Thousand Oaks, California, the former home of the Norwegian Colony. It was built by members of the Colony that settled here in 1890. The structure is designated Ventura County Historic Landmark No. 45 and Thousand Oaks Historical Landmark No. 3. It is a typical turn-of-the-century farmhouse constructed in 1913-14 for Lars and Karn Pederson, Norwegian immigrants and members of the Norwegian Colony, who had first settled in Conejo Valley in 1890. The house was erected at the present location of Ahmanson Science Center, but was later relocated 500 feet (150 m) to its current location at the corner of Regent Avenue and Faculty Street. When its original location was determined to become a science building, the university was quoted $125,000 in moving costs, and therefore planned to demolish the house. However, CLU alumni were able to raise the amount in one day and were successful in saving the house.

One hundred and thirty acres (53 ha) of the Pedersons' land were donated by Lars Pederson’s son, Richard Pederson, in order to establish California Lutheran College in 1959. Additional land including the buildings were given to the university in 1967, at which time the buildings were restored.

While currently housing the university’s music department, the ranch house has also been utilized as the university president's home in 1961 and as the dean's office in 1962-63. It had been the private residence of the Pederson family from its 1913 construction until 1960. The water tower was operational until 1960, when plumbing was installed. It was relocated and renovated in 1986.

A bronze statue of Lars Pederson was dedicated on April 18, 2015, next to the flagpoles near the university's Soiland Humanities Center. Nearby Pederson Road is also named for the Pederson family.

== Historic designation ==
Pederson House and Water Tower was designated Ventura County Historic Landmark No. 45 in June 1978, and was designated City of Thousand Oaks Historical Landmark No. 3 in November 1997.

== See also ==
- Ventura County Historic Landmarks & Points of Interest
