= Tarantula Hill =

Peak in California

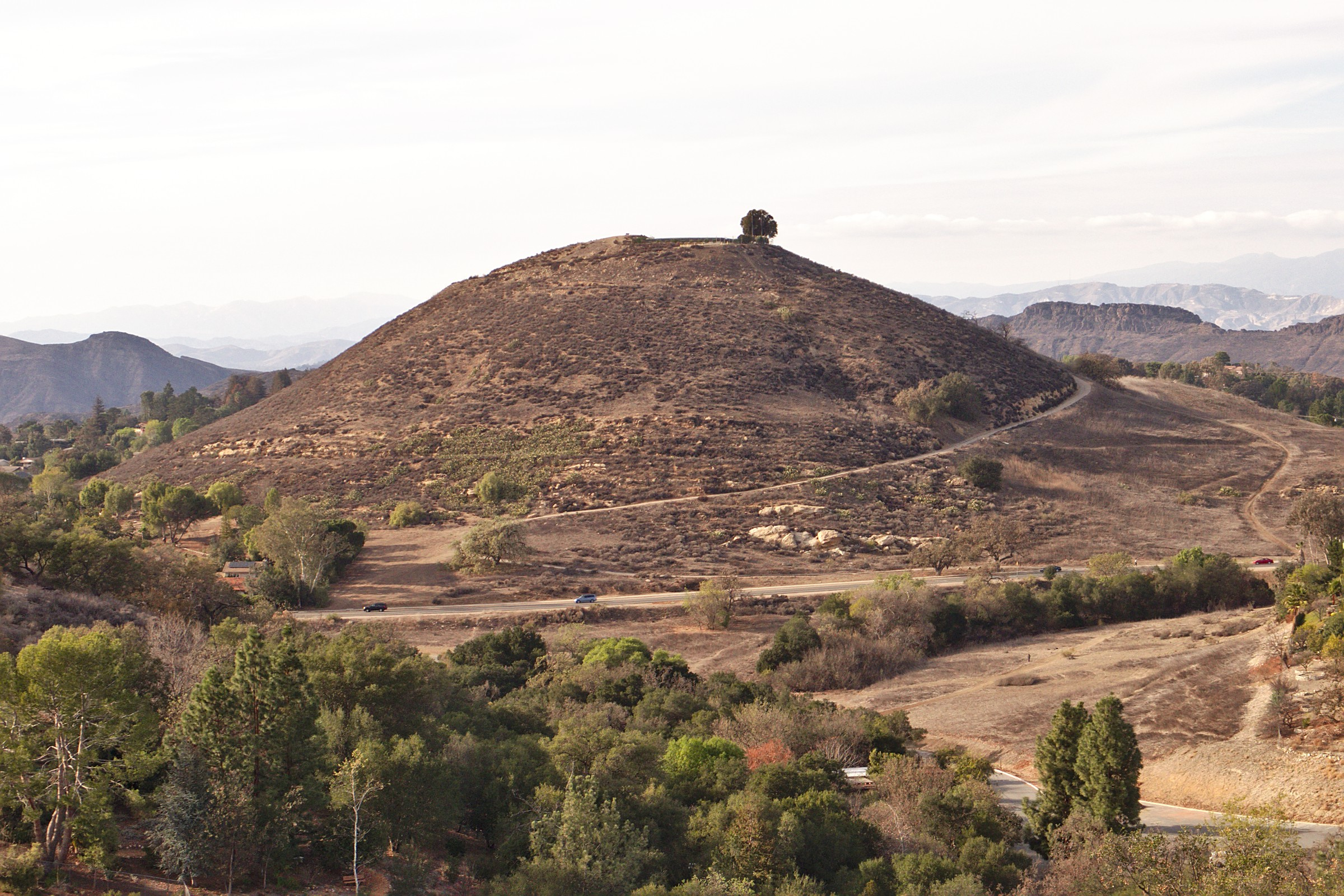

Highest point
- Elevation: 1,057 ft (322 m)
- Coordinates: 34°11′46″N 118°53′16″W

Geography
- Location within California Location within the United States
- Location: Thousand Oaks, California, U.S.

Tarantula Hill, is a 1,057-foot-high (322 m) peak in Thousand Oaks, California. It is located on a 45-acre (18 ha) open space and is operated by the Conejo Open Space Conservation Agency (COSCA). Climbing Tarantula Hill is a steep 0.5-mile (0.80 km) trail; the trailhead is located at 287 West Gainsborough Road, across the road from the main entrance to Conejo Valley Botanic Garden. Atop the mountain there is a 360-degree panoramic view of the Conejo Valley, the Simi Hills and the Santa Monica Mountains. There is also a fenced-in water reservoir located on top. It was once a popular hang-gliding site. It was once a volcanic mound but went dormant 16 million years ago.

The hill is located near the center of the Conejo Valley.

The origin of the name "Tarantula Hill" is unclear, although it has been called that since at least 1966. A brewery in Thousand Oaks is named for it. The hill is occasionally referred to as "Dawn's Peak", although that also refers to "Peak 6582, California" in Riverside county.
