= Norwegian Grade =

Road in California, United States

Coordinates: 34°14′11″N 118°51′41.5″W

The Norwegian Grade is a 2 miles (3.2 km) section of Moorpark Road from the Santa Rosa Valley up into the Simi Hills and the city of Thousand Oaks, within Ventura County, California. Completed in 1911, it may be one of the Norwegian Colony's most notable contributions to the city. Until the construction of California State Route 23 Freeway, this was the most direct route between Moorpark and Thousand Oaks.

After several mishaps while hauling crops down the Potrero- and Conejo Grades, men of the Norwegian Colony decided to construct a new route. Nils Olsen donated the land in 1911, land which lies immediately west of present-day California Lutheran University. Over a two-year period, the extension of Moorpark Road was completed. Tour of California bicycle riders climbed the grade in February 2006 near the end of the seven-day bicycle race.

On the right side of the grade is the McCrea Wildlife Refuge, donated by actor Joel McCrea in 1981. At the bottom of the grade is the intersection of Moorpark- and Santa Rosa Roads, where one can continue north into City of Moorpark, or turn west and follow Santa Rosa Road into City of Camarillo.

== History ==
The road was carved out of a steep canyon hillside by members of the Norwegian Colony in Thousand Oaks, and their hired help, between 1900 and 1911.

Nils Olsen, George Hanson, Ole Nelson, Lars Pederson, and Ole Anderson purchased 650 acres (260 ha) in 1890 along the northern boundary of Rancho El Conejo. These settlers, known as the Norwegian Colony, needed a safe way to move bales of hay and sacks of wheat and barley to the Oxnard Plain and the Hueneme Wharf.

The new route down the grade would allow a gradual descent with no hairpin turns down into the Santa Rosa Valley and would be safer than existing routes to the Oxnard Plain and Moorpark.

Nearby California Lutheran University is located at the site of the Norwegian Colony. The campus was donated by the Pederson family, who were among many Scandinavian immigrants populating the hills of northern section of the Conejo Valley. The historic Joel McCrea Ranch is at the bottom of the grade at the head of the Santa Rosa Valley.

=== Construction Methods ===
In the early 1900s, there were no bulldozers, earth moving equipment, etc. Work was done by hand using a star drill and a sledge hammer to pound holes into the very hard volcanic rock; dynamite was inserted into the holes, fuses lit, everyone ran for cover, and it blew. For construction, they used picks, shovels, crowbars, farm equipment, and $60 worth of dynamite given by Ventura County. The resulting rocks and debris were moved by hand and a horse-drawn fresno scraper to build the narrow, one-lane roadway.

Construction was done in the winter and early spring months because baling and harvesting took precedence during the summer and fall. The grade was later widened to two lanes.

== Renovation ==
The Grade was shut down on September 30, 2010, to allow for 1.5 million dollars of structural improvements. These improvements included regrading and repaving, adding flashing Botts Dots, and reinforcing guard rails. The reopened Norwegian Grade was dedicated on Jan 26, 2011, with a memorial plaque and ceremony.

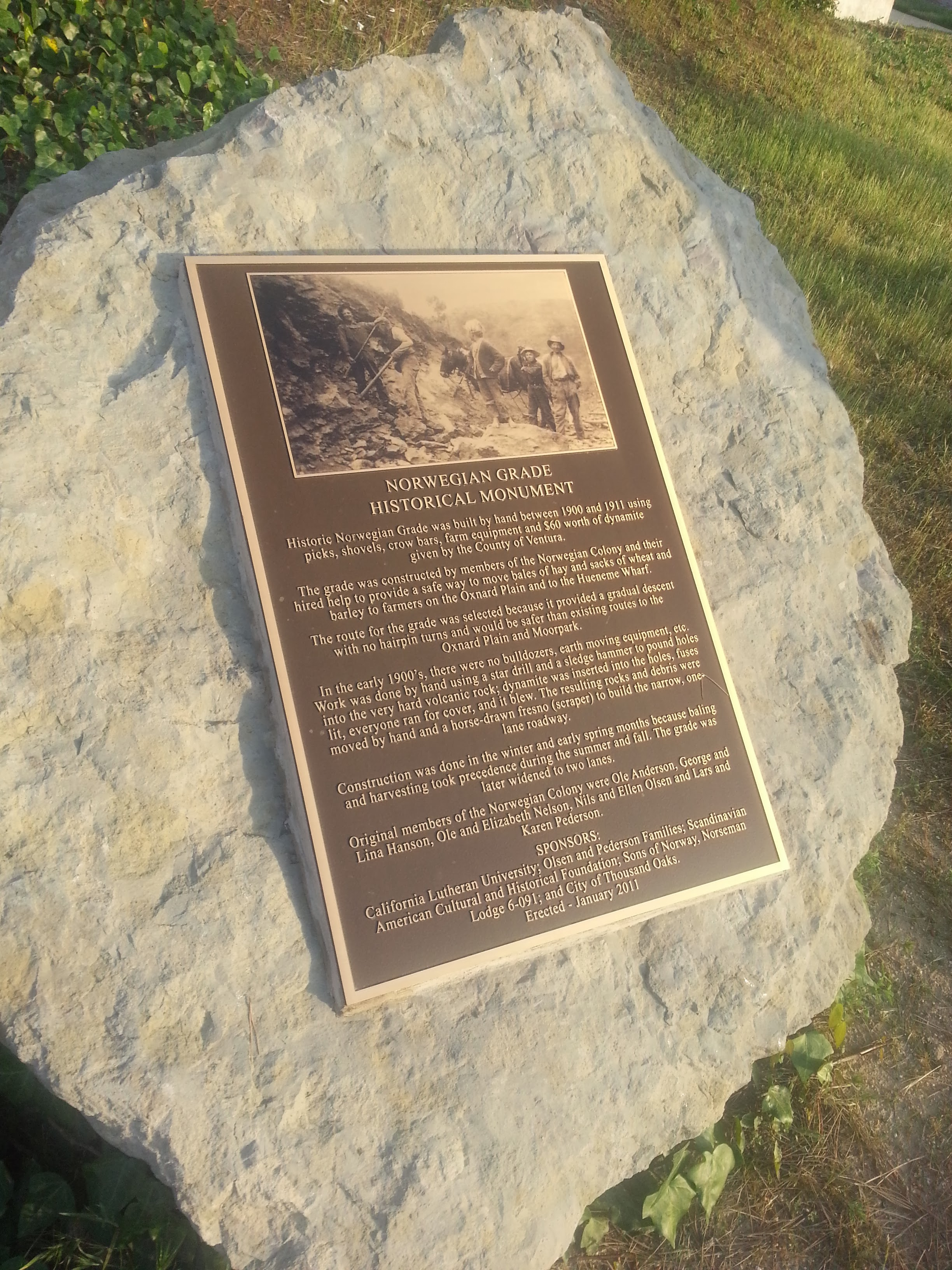
The Norwegian Grade's historical monument plaque, installed after the 2010-2011 renovation

== Traffic ==
At its 100th anniversary, the grade was carrying over 6,000 cars each day.

As of 2017, there is no bike lane on the Norwegian Grade, due to the lack of any shoulder on much of the route. However, since it is the only surface street that connects Thousand Oaks to Moorpark, Camarillo, and adjacent cities, bicyclists use the designated bike lane along California State Route 23 Freeway between Tierra Rejada Road to Olsen Road. Local people express frustrations with both bicyclists and motorists using the route.

There is, however, a special bike lane (called Read Road Bypass) that leads from a dead-end road off of Read Road (Maya Pradera Lane) to Olsen Road near the CA-23 interchange. Southbound cyclists (and pedestrians) can turn left on Read Road from Moorpark Road (or from Sunset Valley Road), turn left on Maya Pradera Lane, and then turn right onto the 0.4-mile long Bypass to reach Olsen Road; northbound cyclists can follow the path in reverse. There is signage for the Bypass on southbound Moorpark Road near Read Road, and on westbound Olsen Road just west of the CA-23 interchange.

== See also ==
- Conejo Grade
