= Conejo Grade =

Steep grade on US 101 Highway in Ventura County, California

Coordinates: 34°12′1″N 118°57′34″W

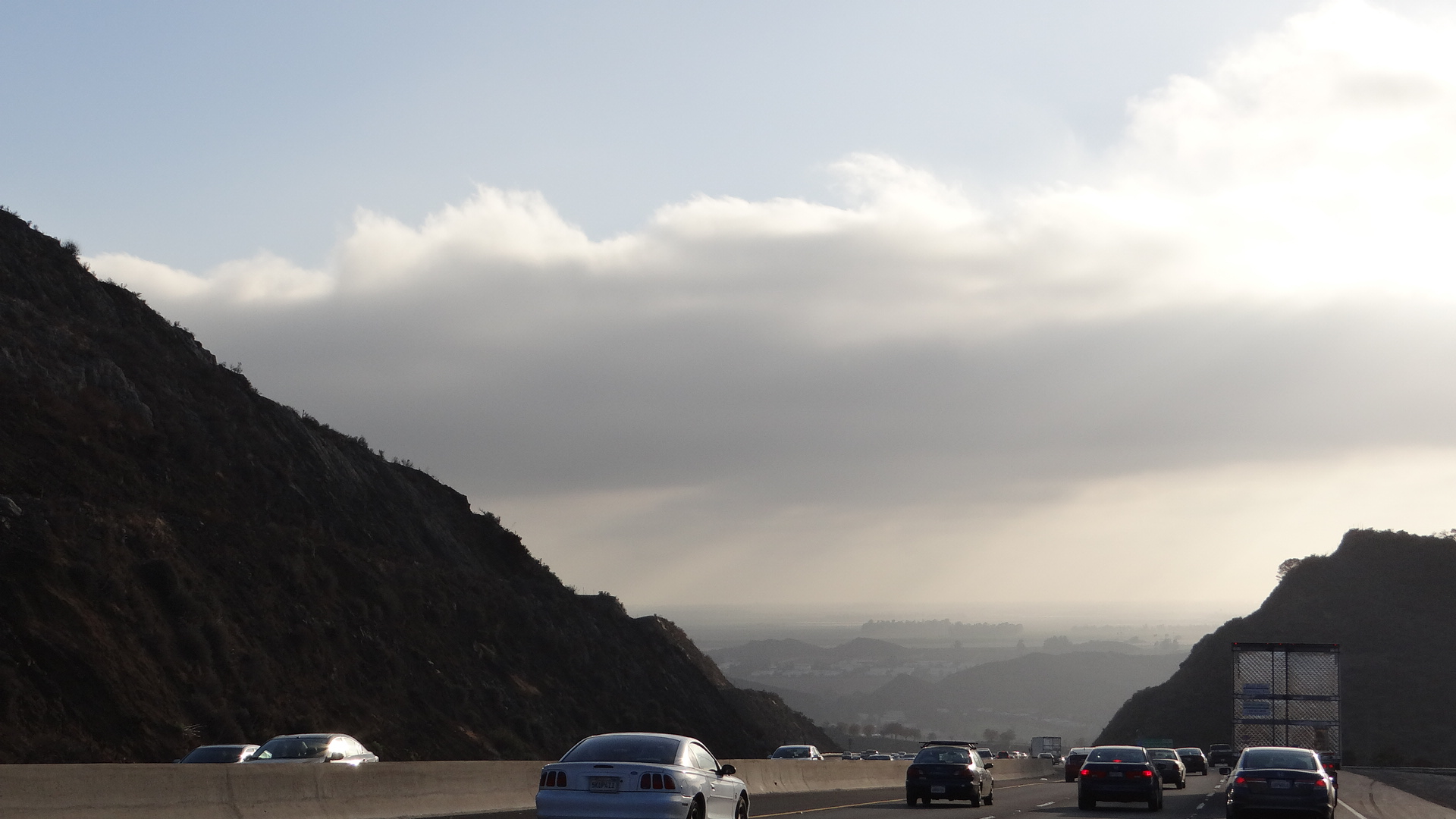
Driving down the Ventura Freeway on the Conejo Grade: from Thousand Oaks into Camarillo

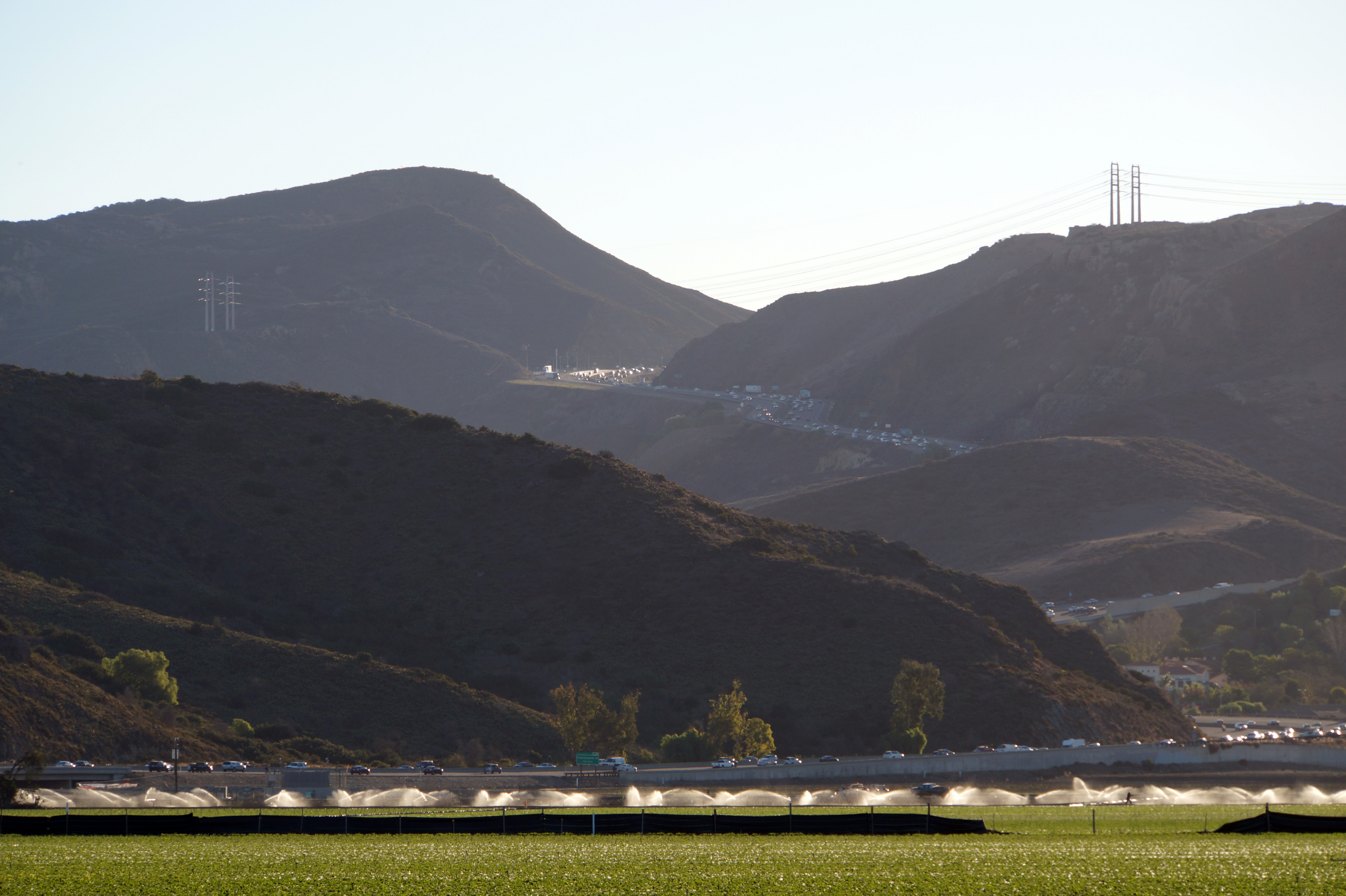
View of the Conejo Grade from Camarillo, CA

The Conejo Grade is a 7% grade incline on a section of US 101 (the Ventura Freeway). Also known as the Camarillo Grade, it links Thousand Oaks and cities of the Conejo Valley, with Camarillo and the cities on the Oxnard Plain. With a summit elevation of 841.1 feet (256.4 m), California Highway Patrol inspection stations for trucks are situated on both sides of the highway at the upper terminus of the grade.

The Conejo Mountain has functioned as a barrier by separating Ventura County into East County and West County. Historically, the mountain was known for its many jackrabbits and prickly pear cacti. The surrounding area was formed by volcanic eruptions millions of years ago, a rare geological formation in Southern California. Within the traditional lands of the Chumash people, they had a trading trail through the pass, and it later served as a trading route for farmers and their wagons down the Conejo Grade to the Hueneme wharf. The grade experienced improvements by the newly established State Highway Department in 1912, when the road measured six miles (9.7 km) long and had 49 curves. Traffic kept increasing and the road was straightened and relocated in 1935. The new road was a mile shorter and only had twelve curves.

== History ==
Designated as part of the commemorative route of El Camino Real, the steep slope or grade was called the "cuesta del conejo" (slope of the rabbit). Early European settlers in the Conejo Valley, known as the Norwegian Colony, needed a safe way to move bales of hay and sacks of wheat and barley to the Hueneme Wharf on the Oxnard Plain. After several mishaps while hauling crops down here and at the Potrero grade, they decided to construct a new route into the Santa Rosa Valley. The Norwegian Grade was carved out of a steep canyon hillside by members of the community and their hired help between 1900 and 1911.

Land for the highway was originally part of the Rancho El Conejo, with contributions from Adolfo Camarillo. A road was in place by no later than 1929, as a re-alignment had been done then. Further widening and reduction of blind curves occurred in the 1930s. Caltrans worked on the current grade setup, when the highway was brought to freeway standards in the 1950s. Portions of the original highway continue to receive use as side roads.

By 2017, the National Park Service has recorded a dozen mountain lions struck and killed by motorists on this section of freeway since 2002 when they began the study. Brother and sister, P-32 and P-33, crossed the freeway in 2015 and became the first Santa Monica Mountains pumas with a tracking collar to cross a freeway in six years. A young male mountain lion, P-55, left the Santa Monica Mountains in 2017 by crossing the freeway on the grade during the night. The animals was wearing a tracking collar used by the National Park researchers studying the mountain lions in the Santa Monica Mountains National Recreation Area. The proposed Wallis Annenberg Wildlife Crossing is intended to primarily benefit the mountain lion population indigenous to the Santa Monica Mountains, which has declined due to the Ventura Freeway acting as a barrier in the wildlife corridor between the Simi Hills to the north and the Santa Monica Mountains to the south. The Ventura County Transportation Commission, Caltrans, and the National Park Service, with support from the National Wildlife Federation, are considering building another wildlife crossing here to connect the natural habitat on both sides of the freeway.

The Hill Fire temporarily closed the freeway on November 8, 2018, as Santa Ana winds pushed the fire to the south towards Newbury Park and California State University Channel Islands. The fire was contained with minimal damage on November 16. The Woolsey Fire started the same day, closed the freeway near Oak Park, grew to over 98,362 acres (39,806 hectares), destroyed an estimated 616 structures, and killed three people.

== See also ==
- U.S. Route 101 in California
