= Thryptomene 'F.C. Payne' =

Australian native plant cultivar

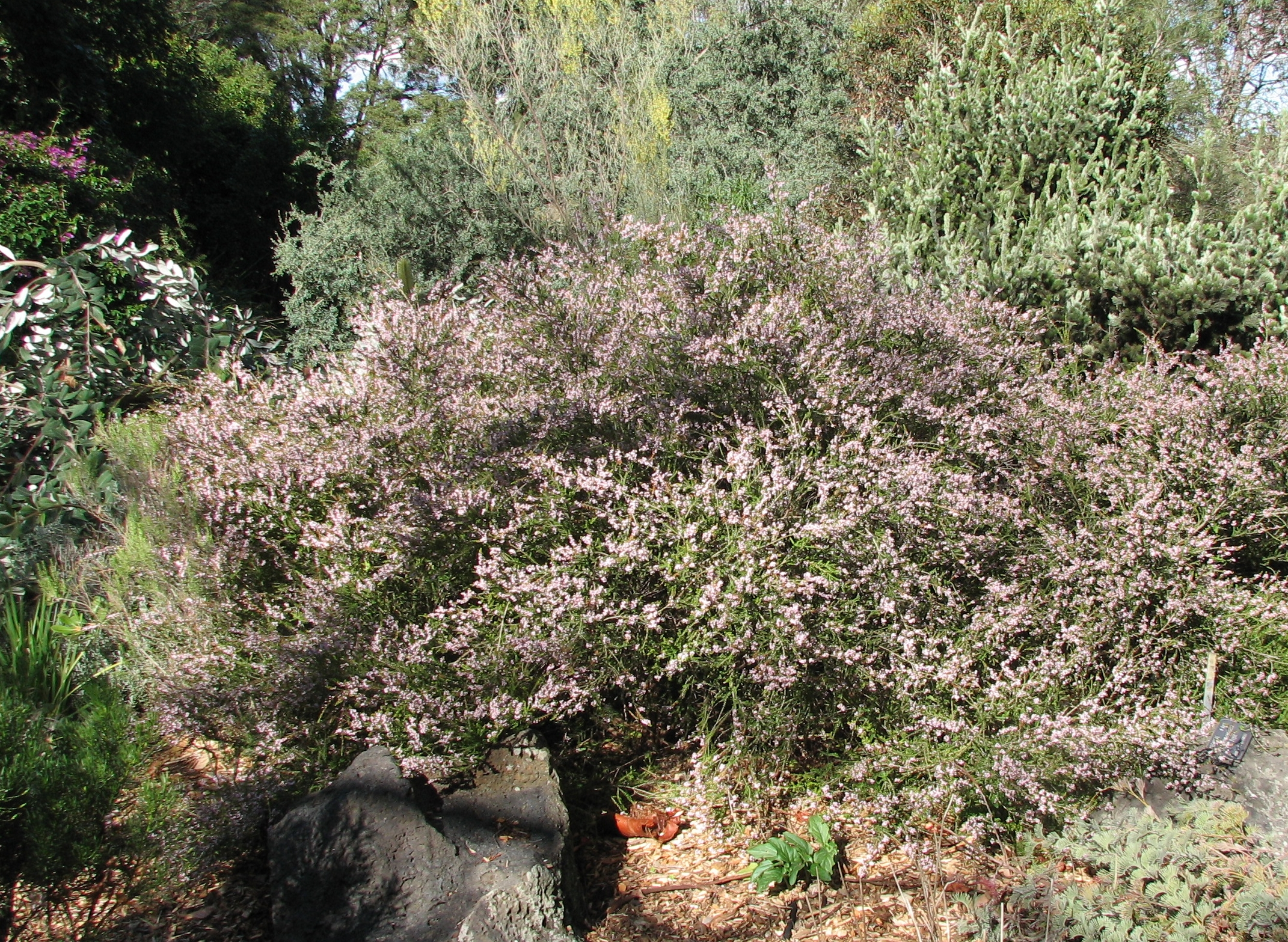
- Species: Thryptomene saxicola
- Cultivar: 'F.C. Payne'
- Origin: Selected by F.C. Payne, South Australia

Thryptomene 'F.C. Payne', commonly known as Payne's thryptomene, is an Australian native plant cultivar that is widely grown in Australia. It is a selected form of Thryptomene saxicola, a species from Western Australia.

== Description ==
Thryptomene 'F.C. Payne' is an open, evergreen shrub with a slightly weeping habit, growing to 1 metre high. It produces masses of long-stalked small pale pink flowers starting in winter and continuing through spring that are attractive to various insects including butterflies. The aromatic leaves are small, about 6 or 7 mm long, and narrow towards the stem.

== Origin ==
In his Handbook of trees and shrubs for the Southern Hemisphere published in 1959, Richmond E. Harrison noted that the cultivar Thryptomene paynei, then newly introduced to New Zealand was "raised by FC Payne of Adelaide". F.C. Payne was the owner of "The Sanctuary" plant nursery in Athelstone, South Australia on the outskirts of Adelaide who promoted the use of Australian native plants in local gardens.

By 1967 the cultivar had become a "garden favorite" in Australia and was featured in a gardening guide for native plants in The Australian Women's Weekly.

The cultivar has variously been referred to as var. paynei, 'Paynei', 'Paynes', 'Payne's Hybrid' and 'Payne's Selection'

== Cultivation ==
Plants may be grown as a low informal hedge or for cut flowers. They are adaptable to most situations, but prefer well drained soil in a sunny or partly shaded position. The cultivar is widely available in most parts of Australia through plant nurseries. It requires propagation through cuttings to be true to the parent plant.
