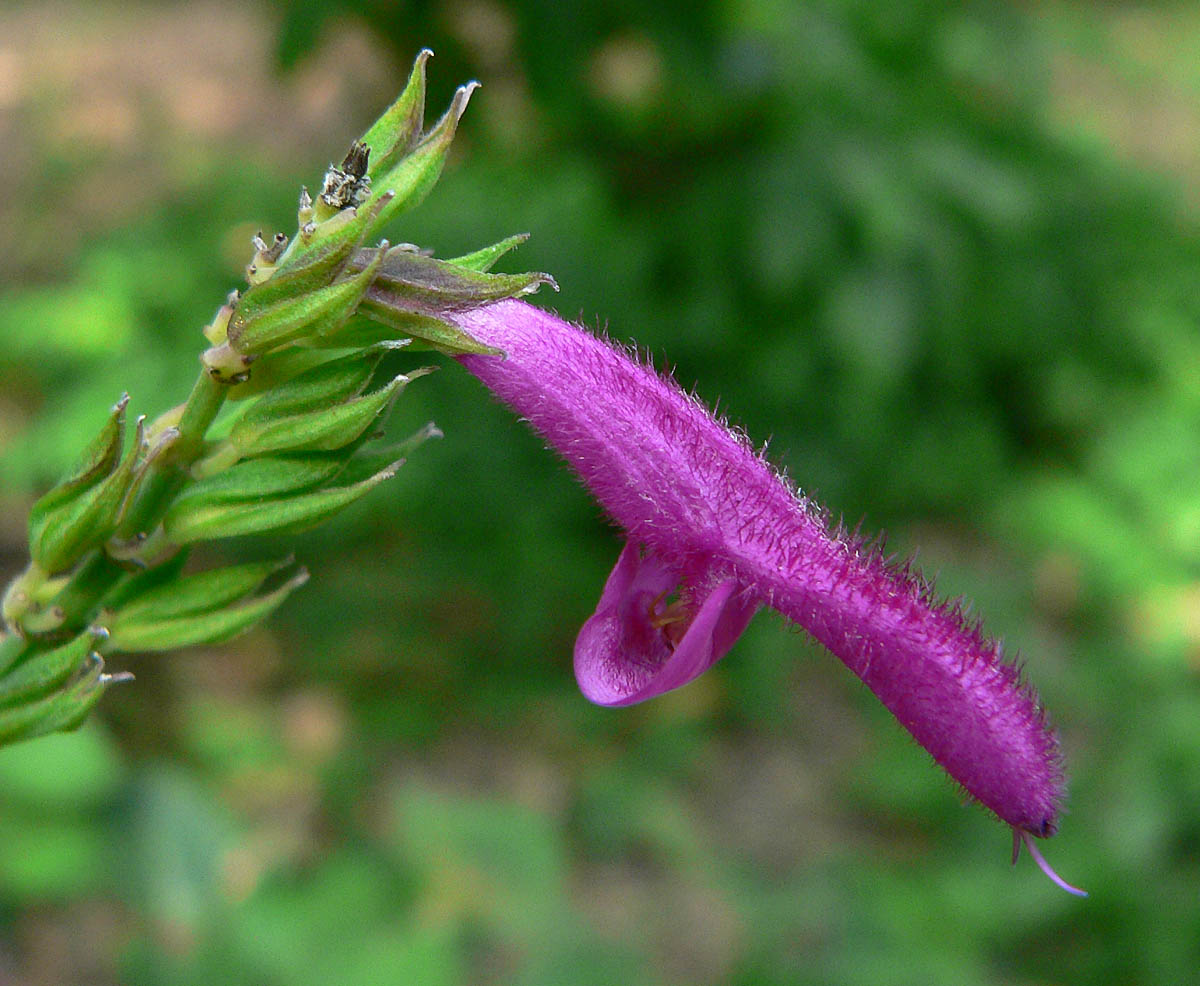

Scientific classification
- Kingdom: Plantae
- Clade: Tracheophytes
- Clade: Angiosperms
- Clade: Eudicots
- Clade: Asterids
- Order: Lamiales
- Family: Lamiaceae
- Genus: Salvia
- Species: S. iodantha

Binomial name
- Salvia iodantha Fernald

Synonyms
- Salvia arbuscula Fernald; Salvia michoacana Fernald

= Salvia iodantha =

Species of flowering plant

Salvia iodantha is a herbaceous perennial native to the mountains of central Mexico, growing between 2,600 and 10,500 ft elevation. It was described by Merritt Lyndon Fernald in 1900 and began appearing in horticulture in the 1980s.

A very robust plant, Salvia iodantha grows to 10 ft or more in height and 6 ft or more in width. Its stems tend to be scandent, often growing into the branches of trees, with its own flowering branches hanging from the tree's limbs. Numerous branches grow from the base of the plant, covered in ovoid or lanceolate mistletoe-green leaves that vary in size and shape—they average about 2–3 in long and 1–1.5 in wide. The flowers are cyclamen-purple, with many fine hairs giving them a velvety texture. The less than 1 in long flowers are not showy by themselves, but the 6 in inflorescences bloom so profusely that the plant is extremely showy. The flowers are tightly packed in whorls, 12 flowers to a whorl, and the whorls are close together on each inflorescence.
