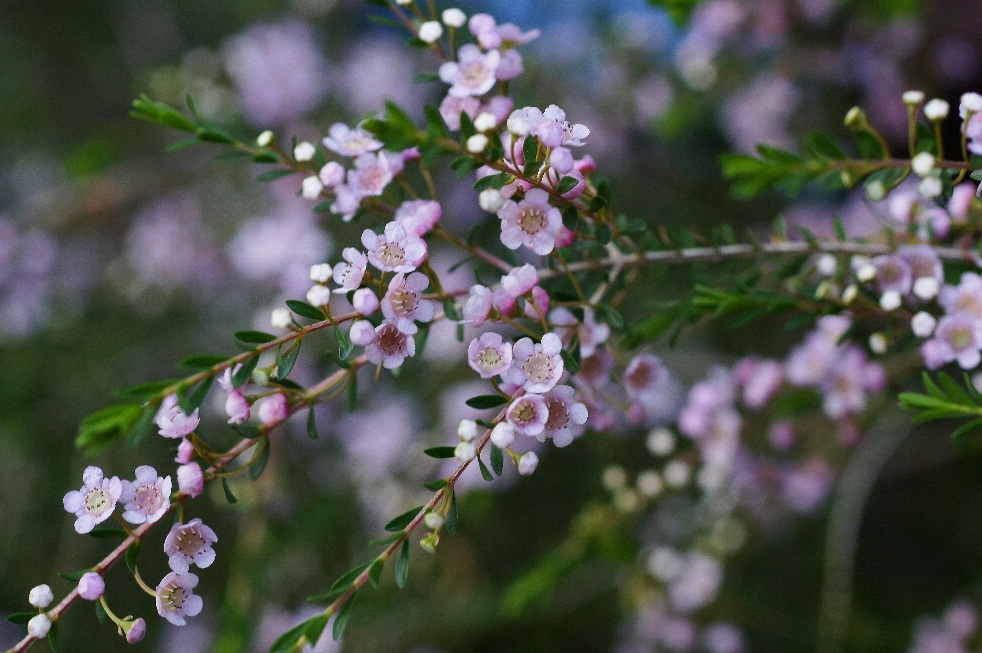
- Thryptomene saxicola in Maranoa Gardens

Scientific classification
- Kingdom: Plantae
- Clade: Tracheophytes
- Clade: Angiosperms
- Clade: Eudicots
- Clade: Rosids
- Order: Myrtales
- Family: Myrtaceae
- Genus: Thryptomene
- Species: T. saxicola

Binomial name
- Thryptomene saxicola (A.Cunn. ex Hook.) Schauer

Synonyms
- List: Astraea saxicola (A.Cunn. ex Hook.) Schauer; Baeckea saxicola A.Cunn. ex G.Don nom. inval., nom. nud.; Baeckea saxicola A.Cunn. ex Hook.; Baeckea saxicola A.Cunn. ex Otto & A.Dietr. nom. illeg.; Bucheria saxicola (A.Cunn. ex Hook.) Heynh.; Gomphotis saxicola (A.Cunn. ex Hook.) Raf.; Paryphantha camphorata F.Muell. ex Miq. nom. inval., pro syn.; Scholtzia decandra F.Muell.; Eremopyxis camphorata auct. non (R.Br. ex Sims) Baill.: Baillon, H.E. (1862)

= Thryptomene saxicola =

Rock thryptomene

Species of flowering plant

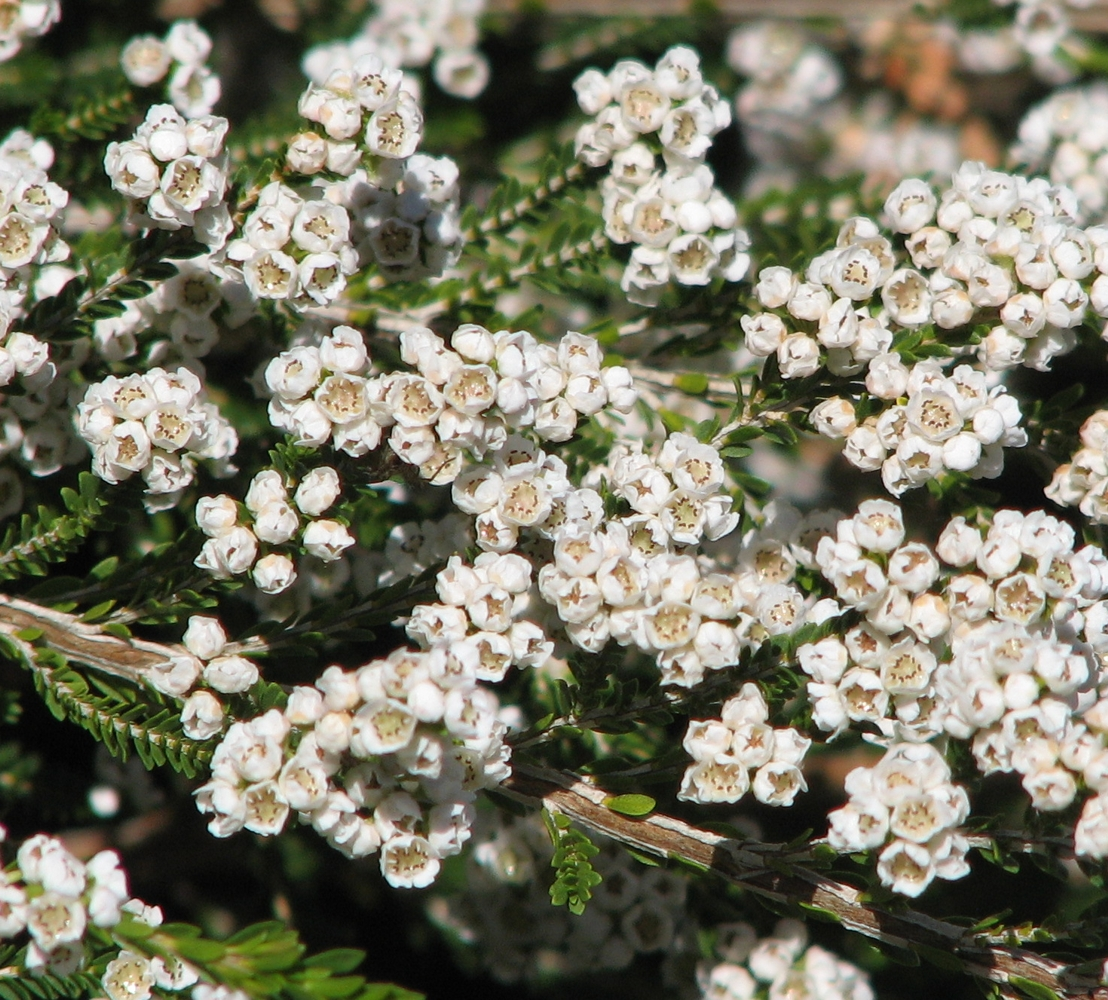
White flower form

Thryptomene saxicola, commonly known as rock thryptomene, is a species of flowering plant in the family Myrtaceae and is endemic to the south-west of Western Australia. It is a spreading shrub with small oval or egg-shaped leaves and pale pink flowers arranged in leaf axils. It is hardy plant, common in cultivation, sometimes as "Payne's hybrid" or Thryptomene paynei.

== Description ==
Thryptomene saxicola is a spreading shrub that typically grows to a height of 0.3–1.5 m (1 ft 0 in – 4 ft 11 in). It has oval to egg-shaped leaves with the narrower end towards the base and 5–10 mm (0.20–0.39 in) long. The flowers are pale pink to white with five sepals, five more or less circular petals and ten stamens. Flowering mainly occurs from February to November, but flowers are often present in most months.

== Taxonomy ==
This species was first formally described in 1832 by Joseph Dalton Hooker in the Botanical Magazine and given the name Baeckea saxicola from an unpublished description by Allan Cunningham. In 1844, Johannes Conrad Schauer changed the name to Thryptomene saxicola in the journal Plantae Preissianae. The specific epithet (saxicola) means "rock-dweller".

== Distribution and habitat ==
Thryptomene saxicola grows on granite outcrops and on hills in the Avon Wheatbelt, Esperance Plains, Jarrah Forest and Warren biogeographic regions of south-western Western Australia.

== Use in horticulture ==
Rock thryptomene has been widely grown in gardens in most parts of Australia and overseas as well. It is a hardy plant in well-drained soil and is moderately frost-tolerant. Propagation is usually by cuttings.

Cultivars include:

- F.C. Payne' ('paynei') - similar to the typical form, introduced to cultivation in the 1960s or before.
- 'Minginew' - mauve-pink flowers It has recently been hypothesized that this may be a form of Thryptomene hyporhytis or an unnamed species.
- 'Pink Lace'- deeper pink flowers, compact form
- 'Seatonii'
- 'Supernova'- pale pink flowers
