= Norwegian Colony =

1890 Norwegian community in Thousand Oaks, California

Norwegian Colony was a Norwegian community in Thousand Oaks, California, in the 1890s and early 20th century. They were among the first pioneers to settle in the Conejo Valley, and was perhaps the most successful colony in Ventura County at the time. The group of Norwegians had emigrated from Norway due to lack of land and widespread starvation, and had first settled in Santa Barbara in 1885. After being told about the cheap land in the Conejo Valley, they relocated to what became the Norwegian Colony in 1890–91. The colony consisted of five families: the Olsen, Andersen (Anderson), Pedersen (Pederson), Nilsen and Hansen families.

The settlement was short-lived. The Olsens lost seven of their ten children, while Ole Andersen, George Hansen, and Lars Pedersen all died within a week of each other during a diphtheria epidemic in 1901.

One of their major contributions was the Norwegian Grade, which connects the Conejo Valley to the Santa Rosa Valley. The narrow, winding one-mile (1.6 km) road was built over two years by men and boys of the colony.

The 7-acre (2.8 ha) Spring Meadow Park in Thousand Oaks was dedicated to the early Norwegians who settled the area.

== Location ==
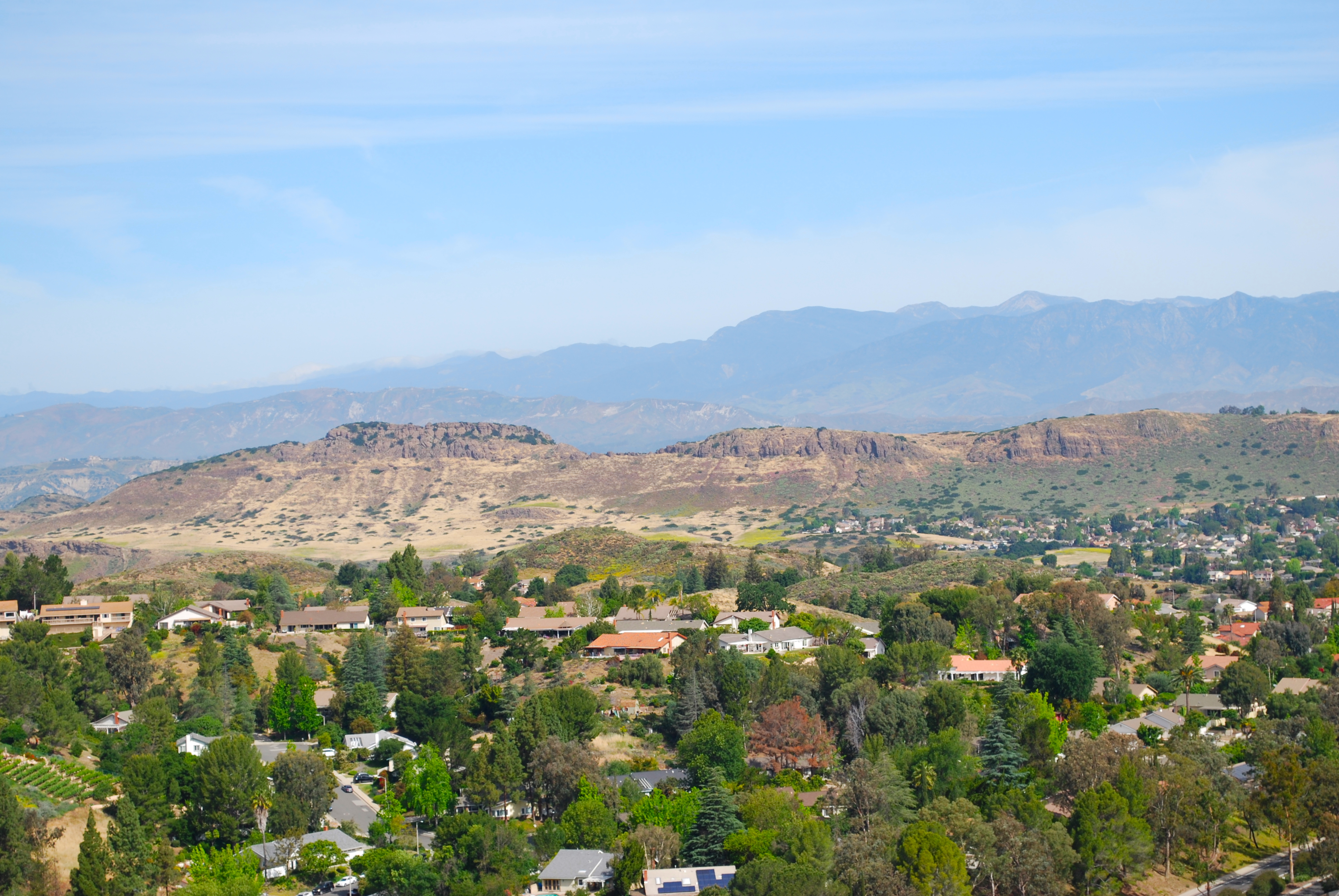
The Norwegian Colony stretched as far north as Mount Clef Ridge.

The Norwegian Colony was situated in northeastern Conejo Valley where California Lutheran University and surrounding areas are located today. The colony stretched from Mount Clef Ridge on the north and nearly to today's Avenida de Los Arboles on the south. It was from Moorpark Road on the east for one mile, and on the west, the western boundaries of California Lutheran University.

Several place names in Thousand Oaks, such as Olsen Road and Pederson Road, derive from the Norwegian settlers. The area was donated for the site of California Lutheran College.

== Early history ==
The lack of land and food in the fjords of western Norway forced many Norwegians to emigrate overseas during the late 19th- and early 20th century. Most of the Norwegians that ended up leaving for Thousand Oaks were from the small village of Stranda by Storfjorden. Several families followed when Lars Berge left for Santa Barbara in 1885.

The Norwegian Colony began in the year of 1890, when five Norwegian families bought five tracts in the northern portion of Conejo Valley. They had been living in Santa Barbara for a few years, and were looking for cheap farm land. They had planned to buy land on Colonia Rancho, but the real estate was too expensive and three times the cost of land in Conejo Valley. They originally bought a total of 651.23 acres (263.54 ha) of uncultivated land from George Edwards, and reportedly paid $3 per acre for flatlands, and $2 for hillsides.

Ole Andersen bought 199 acres (81 ha), Lars Pedersen bought 111 acres (45 ha), Nils Olsen, 139 acres (56 ha), Ole Nilsen, 97 acres (39 ha), and George Hansen,105 acres (42 ha). The properties were located side by side on land which is now by the intersection of Moorpark and Olsen Roads, surrounding California Lutheran University. After acquiring the land, Ole Nilsen was sent by the pioneers back to Norway to get their fiancées. Ole Andersen was the only one to not get married nor establish a family.

The colony was short-lived: Ole Andersen, George Hansen, and Lars Pedersen all died within a week of one another in 1901, due to a typhoid or diphtheria epidemic.

Nils and Ellen Olsen lost seven of their ten children. Nils made a wooden casket for each of the children and buried them in his homemade cemetery. Paula Olsen, age ten, died in 1893; Nora, age six, died in 1900; Emma, age seven, died in 1903; Nora, age five, died in 1905; Laura, age seven, died in 1908; Ned, age eight, died in 1911; and finally, Thora, age seven, died in 1912. Nicolay, Oscar, and Peder Ludvik were the only to survive into adulthood.

== Families ==
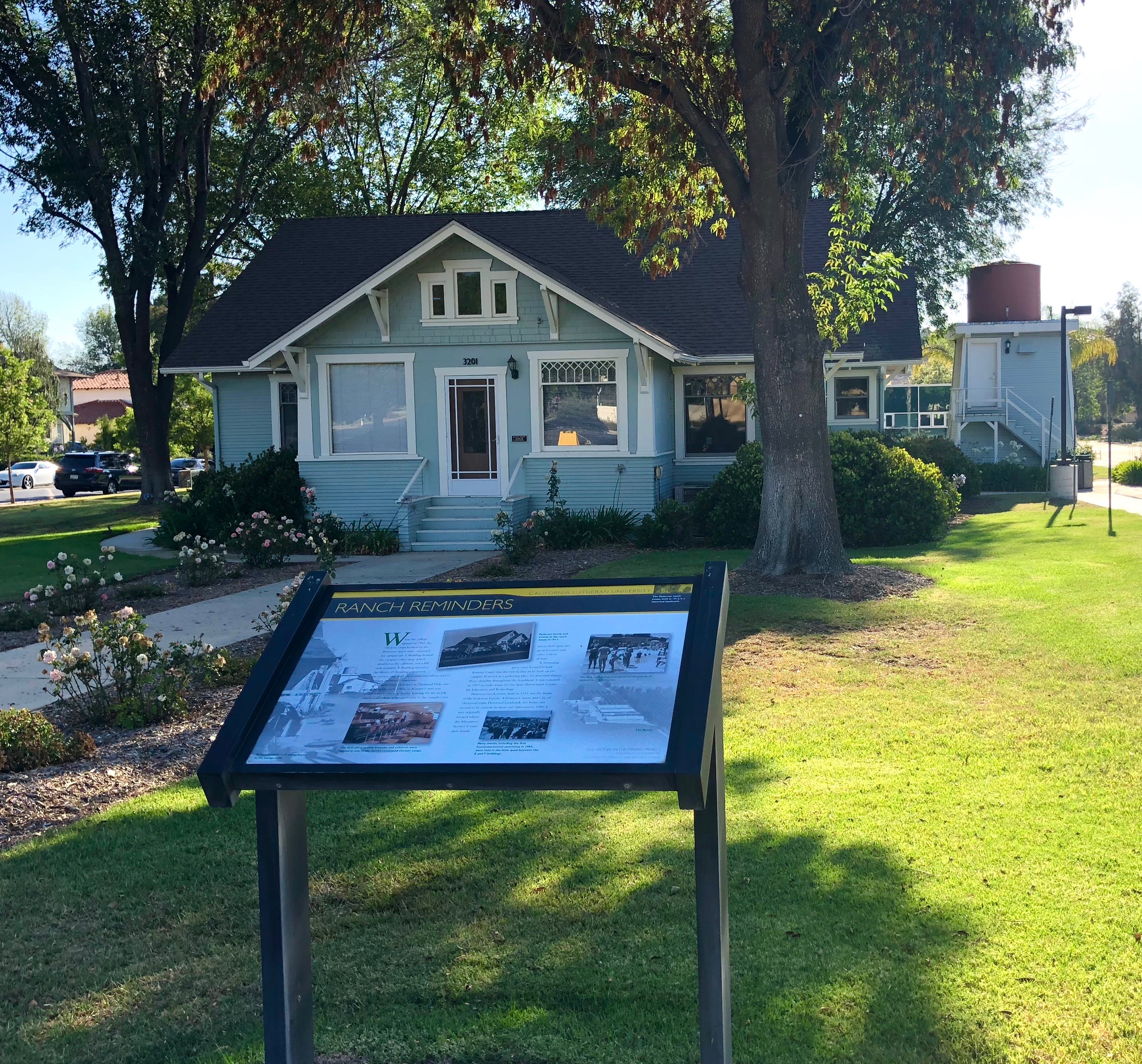
Pedersen's original 1913 home is located at the corner of Regent Ave and Faculty St.

The families were:

- Farm Lot #1 (199 acres): Ole Andersen.
- Farm Lot #2 (111 acres): Lars and Karen Pedersen.
- Farm Lot #3 (97 acres): Ole and Elisabeth Nilsen.
- Farm Lot #4 (105 acres) George and Lina Hansen.
- Farm Lot #5 (139 acres): Nils and Ellen Olsen.

== Norwegian Grade ==
Maybe the most notable contribution of the Norwegian Colony was the hand-made Norwegian Grade. The Norwegians were farmers who were dependent on hauling their cattle and dry crops such as barley and wheat to Port Hueneme, Simi Valley, and Moorpark. Their only routes to Port Hueneme were the out-of-the-way, treacherous Potrero and Conejo grades in Newbury Park. After George Hansen was badly injured at Potrero Grade, and in bed for a year because of injuries, the colony took the initiative to create their own road to the Santa Rosa Valley. They asked Ventura County for help, and were given a $60 donation to buy dynamite.

The one-mile Norwegian Grade was completed in 1911. While it previously had taken residents of Conejo Valley two days to reach Port Hueneme by Potrero Grade, the steep Norwegian Grade reduced the travel time by a full day.

A photograph taken by Ellen Olsen is on display at the Stagecoach Inn in Newbury Park.

== California Lutheran University ==
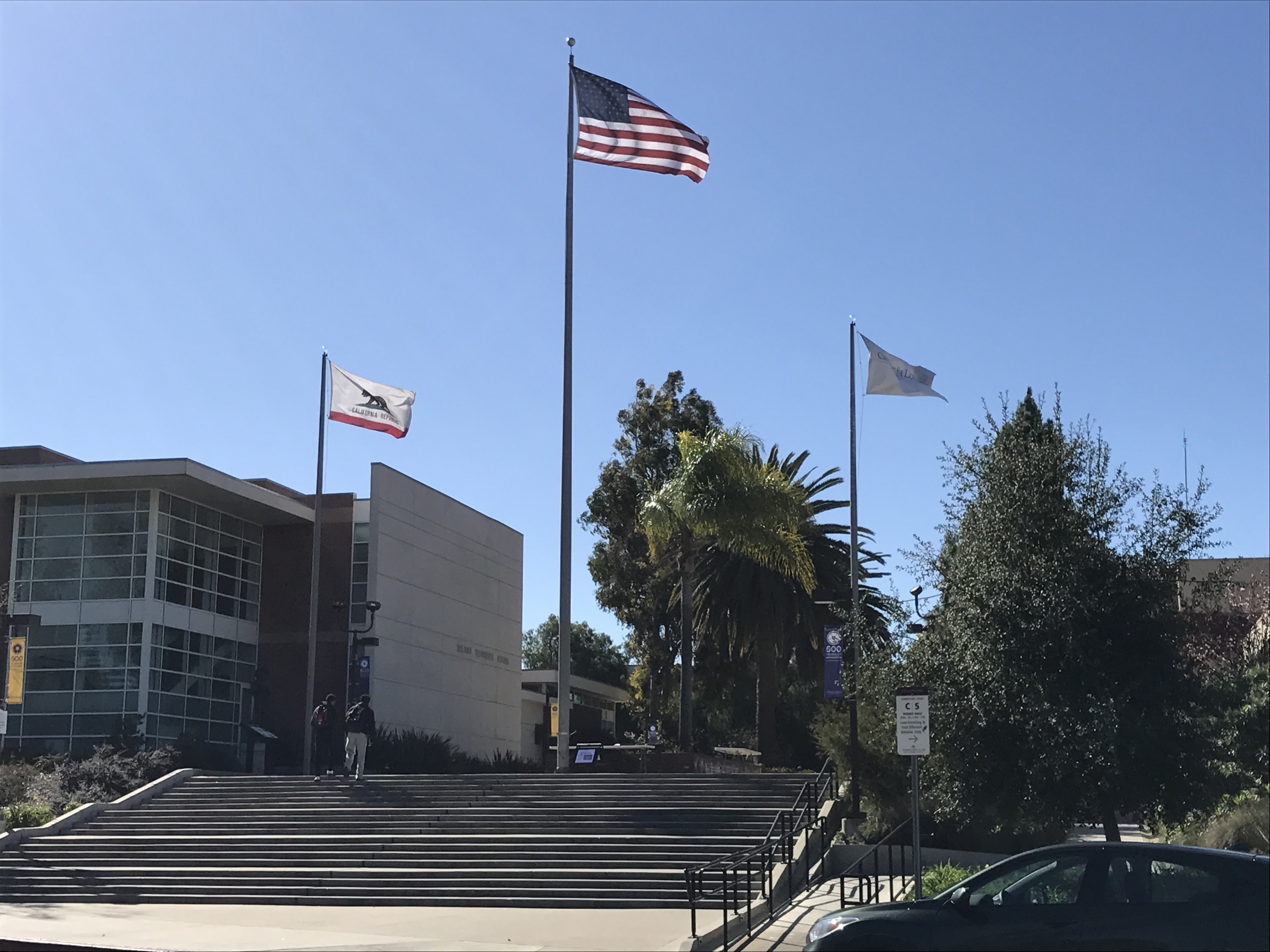
California Lutheran University sits where the Norwegian Colony was located.

130 acres (53 ha) of Lars and Karen Pedersen's former property were donated to establish California Lutheran College in 1959 by land owner Richard Pederson, who was the son of Lars- and Karen Pederson.

Lars Pedersen's original house is known as Pederson House and Water Tower and is designated Ventura County Historical Landmark #45 and Thousand Oaks Historical Landmark #3. It was constructed in 1913, when the Pedersens and Olsens were the only remaining Norwegian settlers in Thousand Oaks. It was moved to the corner of Regent Ave and Faculty Street, about 500 feet (150 m) from where the Ahmanson Science Center has been built.
