= Rancho Conejo Playfields =

Park in Newbury Park, California

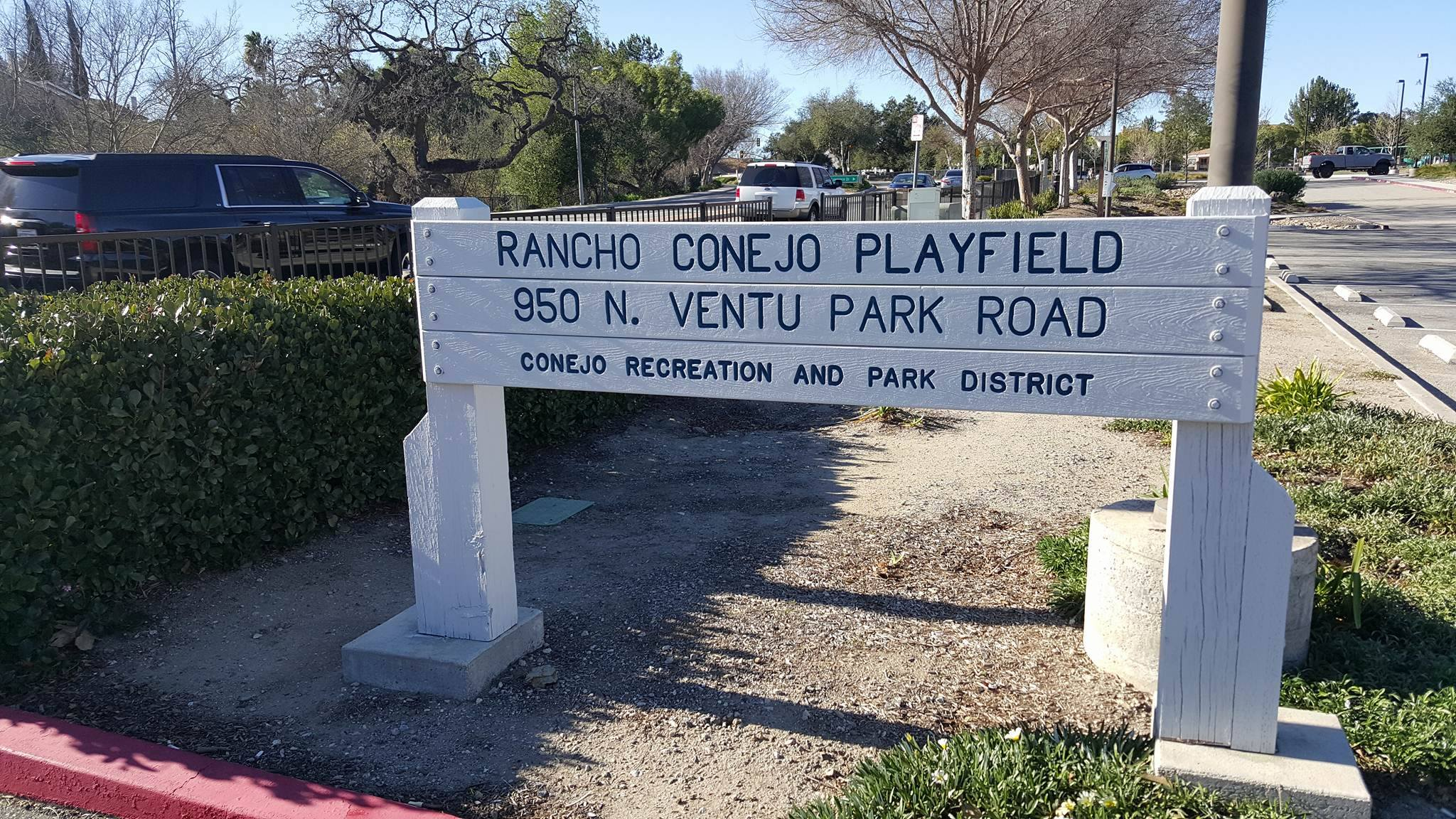
- Sign by entrance
- Interactive map of Rancho Conejo Playfields
- Type: Multi-use community park
- Location: 950 N. Ventu Park Rd. Newbury Park, CA 91320
- Coordinates: 34°11′32.0″N 118°54′44.8″W
- Area: 13 acres (5.3 ha)
- Created: 1997; 29 years ago
- Operator: Conejo Recreation and Park District (CRPD)
- Status: Open daily 7:00am to 10:00pm

Rancho Conejo Playfields is a 13 acres (5.3 ha) multi-use community park in Newbury Park, California, adjacent to Conejo Canyons Open Space and the Arroyo Conejo Nature Preserve which includes 302 acres (122 ha) of public open-space land and numerous trails in the western Simi Hills.

== Recreation ==
The park contains softball fields, soccer fields, tennis courts, a basketball court, turf, playground and picnic areas. It was dedicated in 1997 to the Conejo Recreation and Park District by the Rancho Conejo subdivision's developer, Shapell Industries.

=== Hiking ===
Rancho Conejo Playfields is home to the primary trailhead for the Arroyo Conejo Trail in the western Simi Hills, which has junctions with various hiking trails following Arroyo Conejo into La Branca and Hill Canyon, the Arroyo Conejo Nature Preserve, Santa Rosa Valley County Park, and Mount Clef Ridge and Wildwood Regional Park in Thousand Oaks. The trails are utilized for hiking, horseback-riding, and mountain biking.

== See also ==
- Parks in Ventura County, California
- Simi Hills topics
