= Conejo Canyons Open Space =

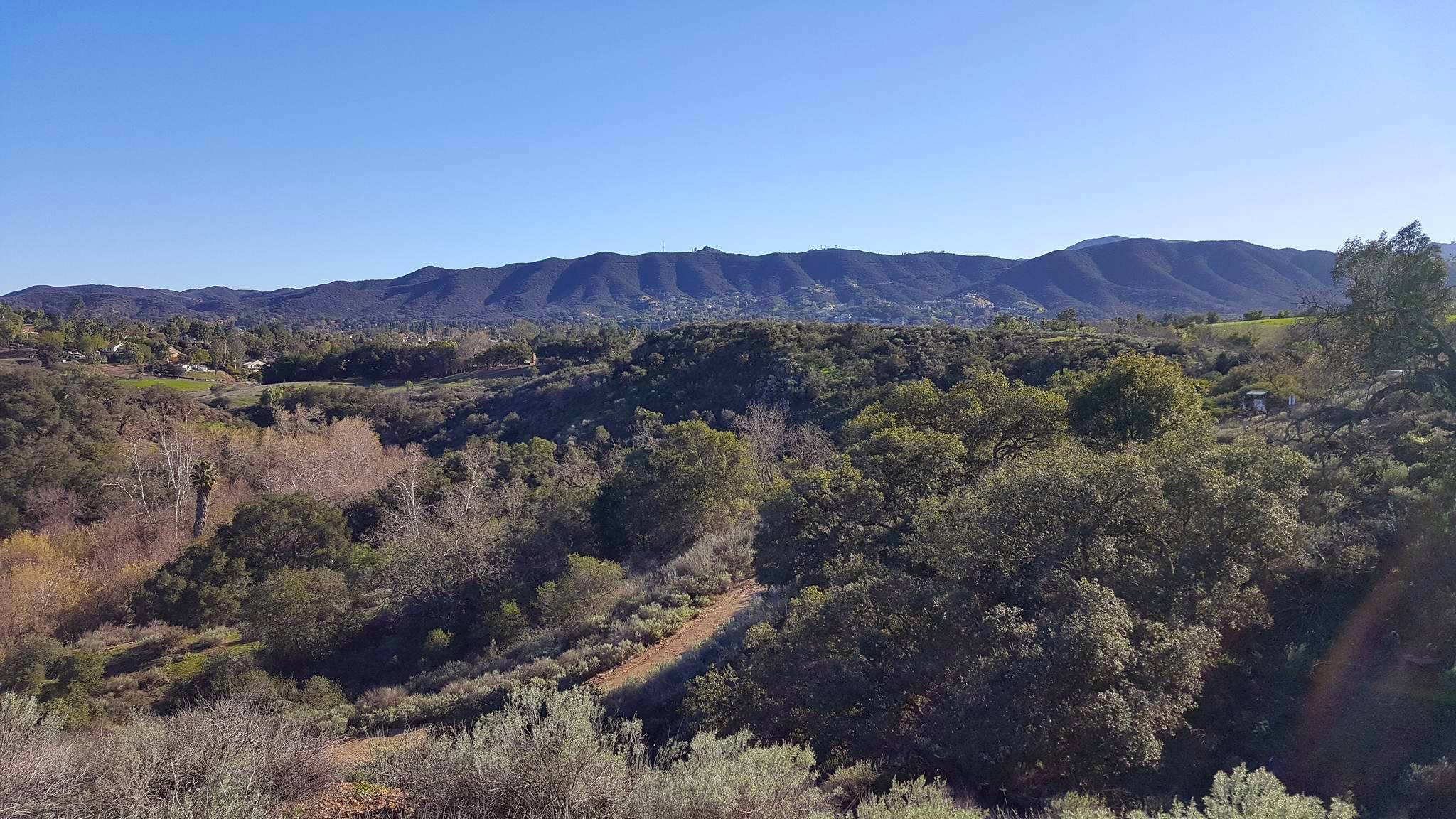
- View of Hill Canyon, La Branca, Newbury Park and the Santa Monica Mountains from the Mount Clef Ridge.
- Interactive map of Conejo Canyons Open Space
- Type: Open-space park
- Location: Newbury Park, CA
- Coordinates: 34°12′49.3″N 118°55′39.4″W
- Area: 1,628 acres (659 ha)
- Operator: Conejo Open Space Conservation Agency (COSCA)
- Status: Open

The Conejo Canyons Open Space consists of 1,628 acres (659 ha) of open-space areas in northernmost Newbury Park, Ventura County, California. It consists of deeply eroded canyons, numerous ridgelines and plateaus in the northwestern portion of the Conejo Valley. The area consists of diverse natural features such as deep canyons with perennial streams, prominent ridgelines, volcanic mountains, and a variety of natural habitats. While some of the flora includes chaparral, riparian habitats, oak woodlands and coastal sage, fauna includes mountain lions, coyotes, mule deer, and bobcats.

== Recreation ==
The Conejo Canyons Open Space includes areas north of the Arroyo Conejo Open Space, the Western Canyon, Western Plateau, Hill Canyon, and undeveloped areas west of the Seventh Day Adventist property in northern Newbury Park. It is situated immediately west of Wildwood Regional Park in Thousand Oaks, CA, and borders the Conejo Grade of Camarillo, CA to its west. On clear days, the many trails in the Conejo Canyons offer panoramic views as far as the Pacific Ocean, the City of Ventura, and the Topa Topa Mountains. The Conejo Canyons Open Space connects to Santa Rosa Valley to the north, through the Conejo Canyons Bridge, and the Conejo Canyons are adjacent to the Arroyo Conejo Open Space in Newbury Park to the south. The canyons follow the Conejo Creek (Arroyo Conejo), and its trails has numerous water-crossings and bridges connecting the various trails. The only developed area here is the Hill Canyon Wetlands, which is the largest man-made wetlands in Ventura County, and makes up about fifteen acres of the Arroyo Conejo Nature Preserve. These wetlands are connected to the Arroyo Conejo, which ultimately discharges into the Pacific Ocean by the Mugu Lagoon. The Conejo Canyons Bridge, which was opened in February 2012, established a connecting trail between the Arroyo Conejo Open Space and the Santa Rosa Valley and beyond to the Mount Clef Ridge of Wildwood Regional Park. The Conejo Canyons Open Space is operated and owned by the Conejo Open Space Conservation Agency (COSCA), and is used for mountain biking, hiking and horse-back riding.

The Conejo Canyons has more than fifteen miles of hiking trails. Some of the trails include the Western Plateau Trail, Hill Canyon Trail, Hawk Canyon Trail, Peninsula Trail, Hawk Canyon Rim Trail, Outlaw Loop, Elliot Mountain Trail, South-East Face Trail, and the Overlook Trail, which enters Santa Rosa Valley before climbing the Mount Clef Ridge to Lizard Rock in Wildwood Regional Park. The Conejo Canyons Open Space can be reached from numerous trailheads, including for instance the Lizard Rock Trail in Wildwood Regional Park, from the Santa Rosa County Park in Santa Rosa Valley, CA, or from the Rancho Conejo Playfields in Newbury Park.

== See also ==
- La Branca
- Wildwood Regional Park
