= Hill Canyon =

Canyon in southern California, U.S.

Coordinates: 34.2267°N 118.9303°W

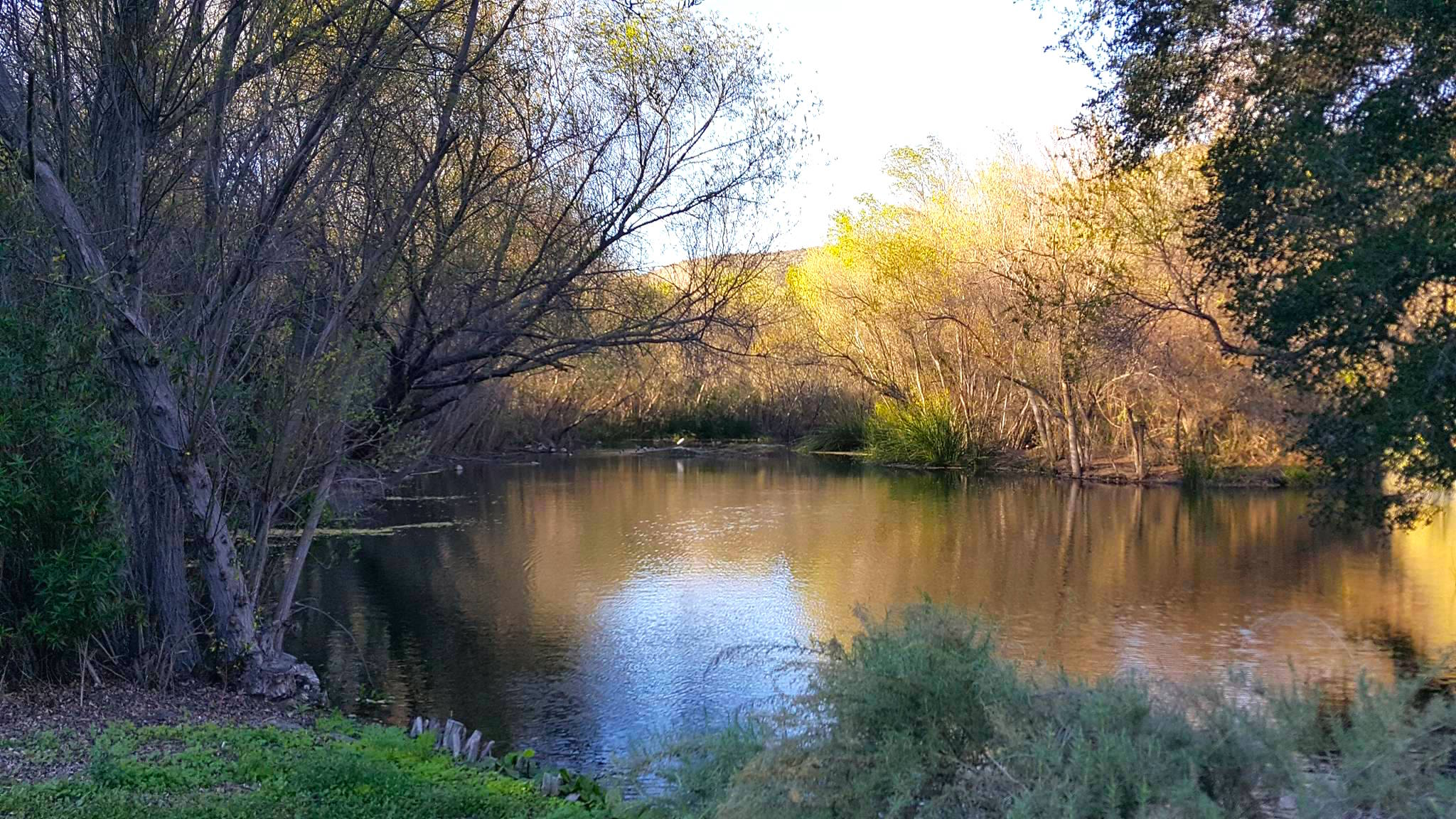
Constructed wetlands of the Hill Canyon Wastewater Treatment Plant'.

Hill Canyon is a deep canyon in the western Simi Hills and within northern Newbury Park and Thousand Oaks, in Ventura County, southern California.

The Arroyo Conejo Nature Preserve includes the central canyon area, and is part of the Conejo Canyons Open Space. It has trails connecting it to Santa Rosa Valley County Park at the canyon's mouth, to Wildwood Regional Park east of the canyon, and to Rancho Conejo Playfields southwest of the canyon.

== Geography ==
The canyon separates the Conejo Grade area and westernmost Simi Hills from the Mount Clef Ridge to the east. It was formed by Arroyo Conejo (creek) flowing down through the Simis from the higher Conejo Valley to the lower Santa Rosa Valley, where the creek merges with Arroyo Santa Rosa and becomes Conejo Creek.

It is located in an area locally known as La Barranca (Spanish for canyon).

It is a deeply eroded canyon at the foothills of dramatic ridgelines and volcanic outcroppings on the Mount Clef Ridge. Hill Canyon is part of the Conejo Canyons Open Space, which is owned and operated by the Conejo Open Space Foundation (COSF).

The canyon is situated east of the Conejo Grade in Camarillo, CA, and is immediately west of the Mount Clef Ridge of Wildwood Regional Park in Thousand Oaks. Once slated for a golf course, the canyon is now protected open space. Hiking trails and bridges are accessible from trailheads found for instance in Wildwood Regional Park, Rancho Conejo Playfields and Santa Rosa County Park. Hill Canyon Trail is the primary trail and connects to the Hawk Canyon Trail, Western Plateau Trail, Arroyo Conejo Trail, Lynnmere Trail, and the Canyon Overlook Trail, which climbs to the top of the Mount Clef Ridge from Santa Rosa Valley.

The only developed area in Hill Canyon is the Hill Canyon Wastewater Treatment Plant (HCTP), which takes up about sixty acres and includes the largest bodies of water in Newbury Park. It has a capacity of 14,000,000 gallons per day, and approximately 3.7 billion gallons of water are conveyed here every year for processing. Thousands of gallons in sewage spills have led to leaks into the adjacent Conejo Creek, which discharges at its estuary in Mugu Lagoon.

The Conejo Canyons make up a total of 1,628 acres when combined. The flora includes coast live oak- and riparian woodlands, coastal sage scrub, as well as interior sage scrub and chaparral. From nearby peaks there are panoramic views as far as the Pacific Ocean, the Oxnard Plain, and the Topatopa Mountains. The trails here are used for horseback-riding, mountain biking, running and hiking.

== See also ==
- Conejo Canyons Open Space
- Wildwood Regional Park
- Simi Hills topics
