= Santa Rosa Valley, California =

- Unincorporated community Census-designated place
- Location in Ventura County and the state of California

- Location within the state of California
- Coordinates: 34°14′43″N 118°54′08″W
- Country: United States
- State: California
- County: Ventura

Area
  - Total: 7.214 sq mi (18.684 km^{2})
  - Land: 7.214 sq mi (18.684 km^{2})
  - Water: 0 sq mi (0 km^{2}) 0%
- Elevation: 433 ft (132 m)

Population (2020)
  - Total: 3,312
  - Density: 459.1/sq mi (177.3/km^{2})
- Time zone: UTC-8 (Pacific (PST))
  - Summer (DST): UTC-7 (PDT)
- GNIS feature ID: 2585444

Santa Rosa Valley is a rural unincorporated community, named after the eponymous valley in which it lies, located in Ventura County, California, United States. For statistical purposes, the United States Census Bureau has defined Santa Rosa Valley as a census-designated place (CDP). The census definition of the area may not precisely correspond to local understanding of the area with the same name. The 2020 United States census reported Santa Rosa Valley's population was 3,312. Santa Rosa Valley sits at an elevation of 433 feet (132 m).

It lies within Ventura County north of Newbury Park, between Thousand Oaks and Camarillo. Norwegian Grade, which was constructed by the Norwegian Colony, connects Santa Rosa Valley to Thousand Oaks, while it may be reached from Santa Rosa Road in Camarillo.

The Santa Rosa Valley lies right north of the Conejo Valley and along the Arroyo Santa Rosa and Arroyo Conejo. While there has been significant suburban development, much of the area consists of agricultural lands and is home to a variety of wildlife such as bobcats, gray foxes, mule deer, coyotes, and more. The valley is likely the habitat for more than one mountain lion, and lions are relatively frequently observed here. Immediately to the south is the Conejo Canyons Open Space, with trails leading to the Arroyo Conejo Nature Preserve (La Branca) and Hill Canyon, and the community also borders Mount Clef Ridge and Wildwood Regional Park to the south.

Santa Rosa Valley was home to a Chumash village in pre-colonial times, known as Šumpaši, which was located by Conejo Creek.

== Geography ==
According to the United States Census Bureau, the CDP covers an area of 7.2 square miles (18.7 km^{2}), all land.

== Demographics ==
Historical population
Census	Pop.	Note	%±
2010	3,334		—
2020	3,312		−0.7%
U.S. Decennial Census; 1850–1870 1880-1890; 1900 1910 1920; 1930 1940 1950; 1960 1970 1980; 1990 2000 2010

Santa Rosa Valley first appeared as a census designated place in the 2010 U.S. census.

=== 2020 census ===
As of the 2020 census, Santa Rosa Valley had a population of 3,312. The population density was 459.1 inhabitants per square mile (177.3/km^{2}). The age distribution was 18.5% under the age of 18, 7.1% aged 18 to 24, 16.1% aged 25 to 44, 33.1% aged 45 to 64, and 25.2% aged 65 or older. The median age was 52.1 years. For every 100 females, there were 99.0 males, and for every 100 females age 18 and over there were 95.6 males age 18 and over.

Of residents, 83.3% lived in urban areas and 16.7% lived in rural areas.

The whole population lived in households. There were 1,120 households, of which 27.1% had children under the age of 18 living in them. Of all households, 73.0% were married-couple households, 2.5% were cohabiting couple households, 11.0% were households with a male householder and no spouse or partner present, and 13.5% were households with a female householder and no spouse or partner present. About 12.2% of households were made up of individuals and 7.7% had someone living alone who was 65 years of age or older. The average household size was 2.96. There were 933 families (83.3% of all households).

There were 1,168 housing units at an average density of 161.9 units per square mile (62.5 units/km^{2}), of which 1,120 (95.9%) were occupied. Of these, 91.9% were owner-occupied and 8.1% were occupied by renters. Of all housing units, 4.1% were vacant. The homeowner vacancy rate was 0.6% and the rental vacancy rate was 0.0%.

Racial composition as of the 2020 census
Race	Number	Percent
White	2,548	76.9%
Black or African American	21	0.6%
American Indian and Alaska Native	10	0.3%
Asian	205	6.2%
Native Hawaiian and Other Pacific Islander	5	0.2%
Some other race	134	4.0%
Two or more races	389	11.7%
Hispanic or Latino (of any race)	397	12.0%

== Education ==
Almost all of the CDP is served by the Pleasant Valley Elementary School District and the Oxnard Union High School District, while a small portion is served by the Moorpark Unified School District.
