= Santa Rosa Valley =

Place in California, United States

Coordinates: 34.2438889°N 118.8966667°W

The Santa Rosa Valley is a small valley and rural unincorporated community in Ventura County, Southern California.

The valley is about 5 miles (8.0 km) long (east to west) and 2 miles (3.2 km) wide (north to south).

Although not within its city limits, the community is sometimes considered to be an outlying neighborhood of Camarillo.

There is an elementary school within the valley, Santa Rosa Technology Magnet School, which is part of the PVSD district.

It is bordered on the south by the western Simi Hills and Wildwood Regional Park, and on the north by Las Posas Hills. The valley is drained principally by the Arroyo Santa Rosa, a tributary of Calleguas Creek which flows into the Pacific Ocean at Mugu Lagoon.
