= Arroyo Conejo =

Creek in the Conejo Valley, California

Coordinates: 34.2263°N 118.9302°W

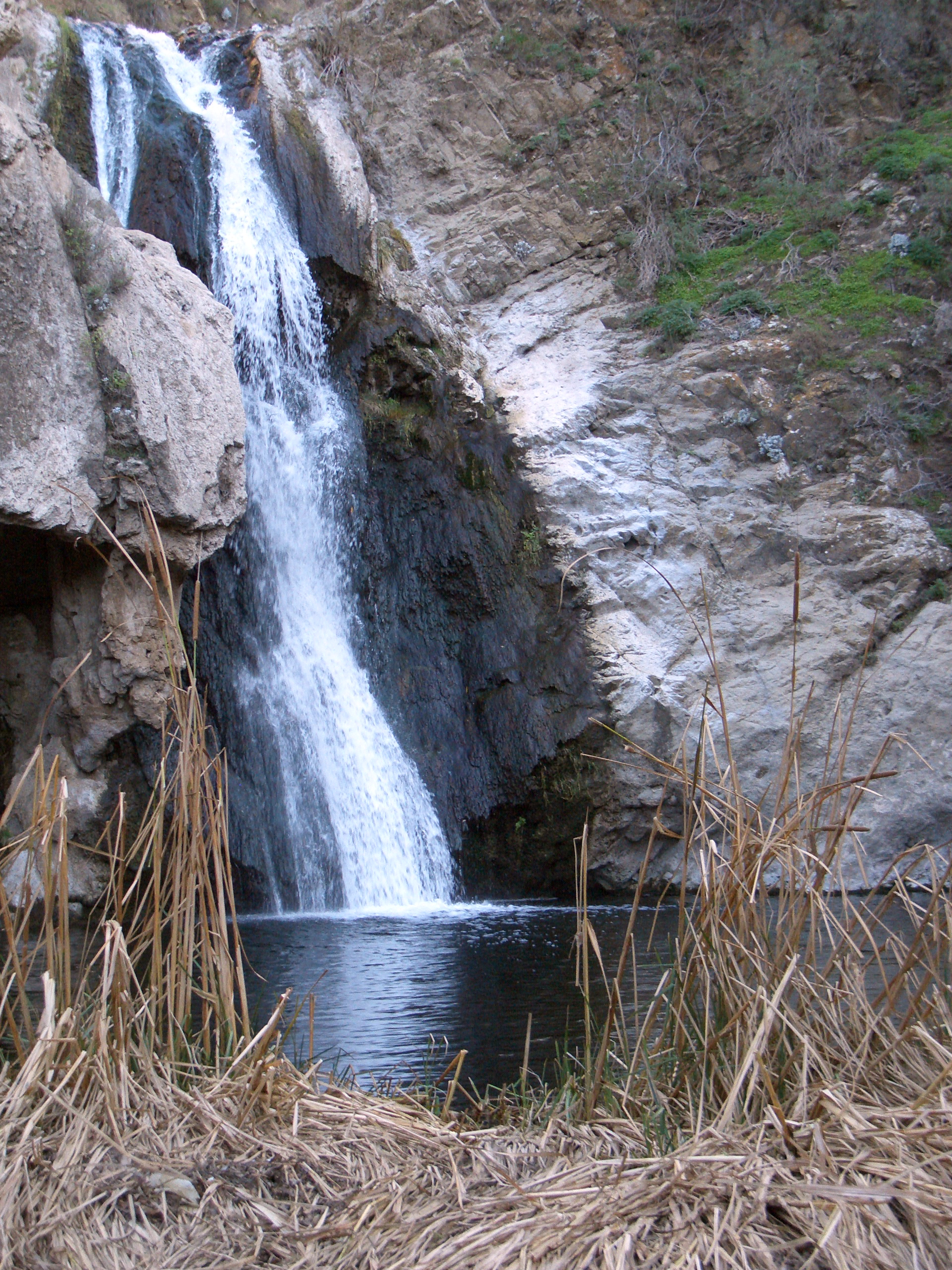
- Paradise Falls

Location
- Country: United States
- County: Ventura

Physical characteristics
- Mouth
  - location: Discharges to the Pacific by Mugu Lagoon

Basin features
- River system: Calleguas Creek

Arroyo Conejo (Spanish for “Rabbit Creek”) carries part of the longest creek in the Conejo Valley which sprawls past the cities of Thousand Oaks and Camarillo, and the communities of Newbury Park, Casa Conejo and Santa Rosa Valley. Arroyo Conejo is the primary drainage for the City of Thousand Oaks. Its watershed covers 57 square miles (150 km^{2}) of which 43 square miles (110 km^{2}) are in the Conejo Valley and 14 square miles (36 km^{2}) in the Santa Rosa Valley.

Historically, it was a seasonal-running creek but urban runoff from irrigation currently makes it perennial. Its north fork carved Wildwood Canyon out of bedrock over several millennia. The south fork originates in the Conejo Hills above Newbury Park. It also follows Thousand Oaks Boulevard, where it runs directly along and below the boulevard. In certain areas, the creek runs through concrete culverts and runs underneath the street. Past Newbury Park's Hill Canyon, the creek meets with Arroyo Santa Rosa in Santa Rosa Valley as it runs through the Pleasant Valley basin on its way across the Oxnard Plain to its estuary at Mugu Lagoon. Due to limited access, suggestions have been made to make its banks into public amenities similar to that of San Antonio River Walk, or, developing a public use trail following the creek, similar to the bike path of Arroyo Simi in Simi Valley, California. It is part of the Calleguas Creek watershed, which drains an area of 343 sq. mi. in southern Ventura County.

Within Wildwood Regional Park, its gorge and its 40-foot (12 m) cascade, Paradise Falls, are among the park's most visited attractions.

== History ==
The area surrounding Arroyo Conejo was once inhabited by the Chumash Indians, who also settled much of the region from the Santa Monica Mountains to the Conejo and Simi Valleys, with their presence dating back 10,000–12,000 years. There have been numerous discoveries of Chumash artifacts and petroglyphs along the creek, particularly in the Santa Monica Mountains.

Several people have drowned in the creek during the winter when water levels are higher. A person drowned by Hill Canyon in 1992, while another person drowned here in 2017.

== Course ==
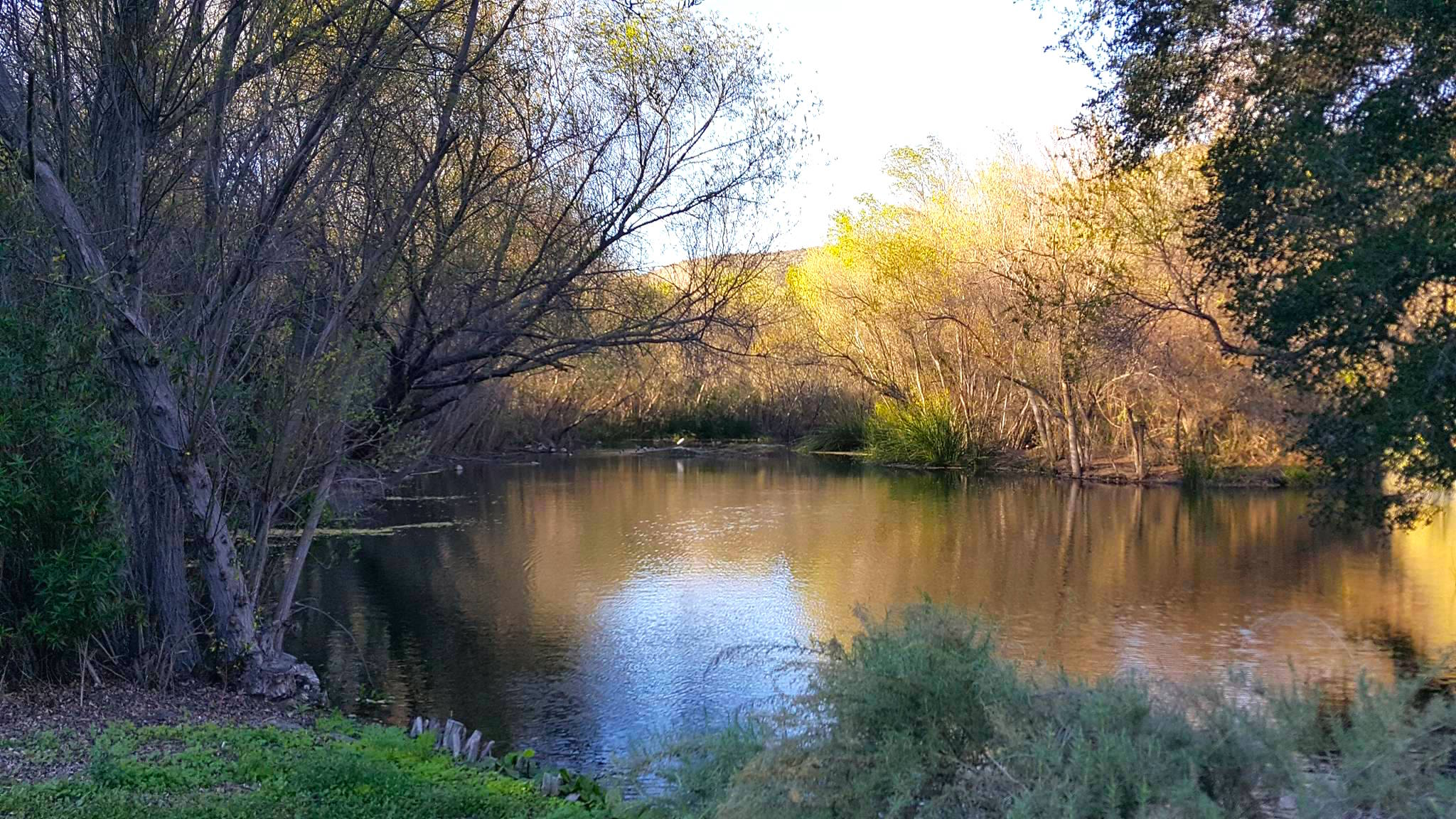
Wetlands in Hill Canyon.

It runs from the Conejo Hills of Newbury Park, crosses horizontally Casa Conejo, before entering Thousand Oaks and Wildwood Regional Park. It originates in the Conejo Hills and streams into Hill Canyon and further into the Santa Rosa Valley, where it merges with Arroyo Santa Rosa and becomes Conejo Creek. Conejo Creek drains through the Pleasant Valley Basin, joins Calleguas Creek on the Oxnard Plain and enters into the Pacific Ocean by its estuary at Mugu Lagoon at the north end of the Santa Monica Mountains. Its northern border is made up by the Santa Susana Mountains, South Mountain and the Oak Ridge Mountains. Its southern boundary is compromised by the Santa Monica Mountains to the southwest and the Simi Hills to the southeast.

== Wildlife ==
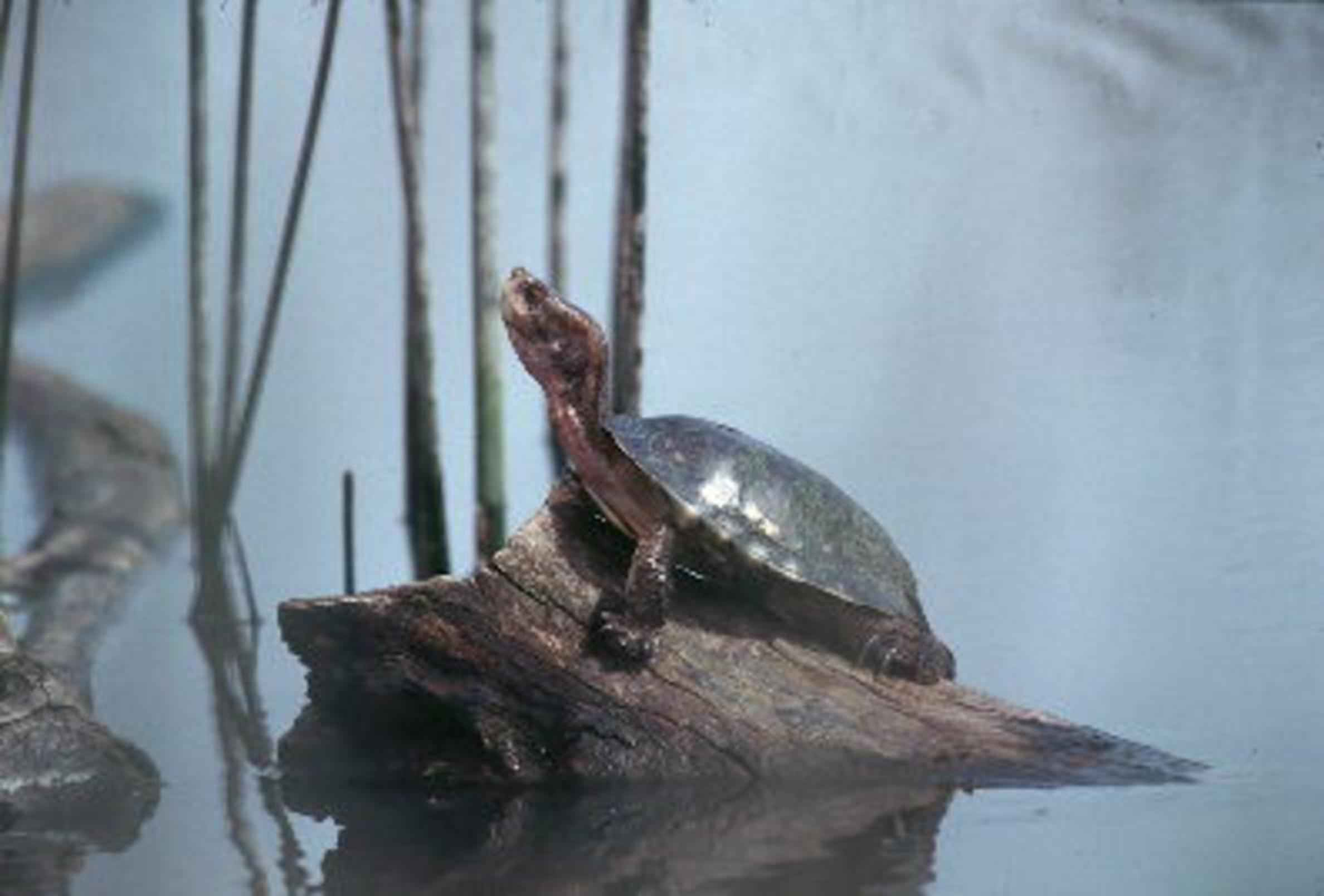
The western pond turtle is an endemic species to Arroyo Conejo.

Some of the fauna found in the creek includes the Western pond turtle and numerous species of amphibians: the California red-legged frog, Western toad, American bullfrog, California toad and the Pacific tree frog. Fish species include the Brown bullhead, Green sunfish, Arroyo Chub, and Mosquitofish. It is an important habitat for various species of freshwater-nesting birds in the Conejo Valley. Some of the species include the Great blue heron, White-faced ibis, Black-crowned night heron, Green heron, Black-necked stilt, Great egret, Snowy egret, Belted kingfisher, Black phoebe, Killdeer, Common yellowthroat, Greater yellowlegs, American coot, and Mallard.

== Recreation ==
It is debated whether Thousand Oaks will make a multi-use pathway along the creek, similar to that of Arroyo Simi in Simi Valley.

There are several parks and public open-space areas bordering the creek:

- In Newbury Park: Arroyo Conejo Open Space, Walnut Grove Park, Pepper Tree Playfield, Conejo Canyons Open Space, Borchard Community Park (by Casa Conejo).
- In Thousand Oaks: Wildwood Regional Park, Glenwood Park, North Meadows Park, South Meadows Park.
- In Camarillo: Camarillo Oak Grove County Park, Trailside Park, Heritage Park, Quito Park (by Santa Rosa Valley).
- In Santa Rosa Valley: Santa Rosa County Park
