= Arroyo Simi =

Coordinates: 34.271619°N 118.9246°W

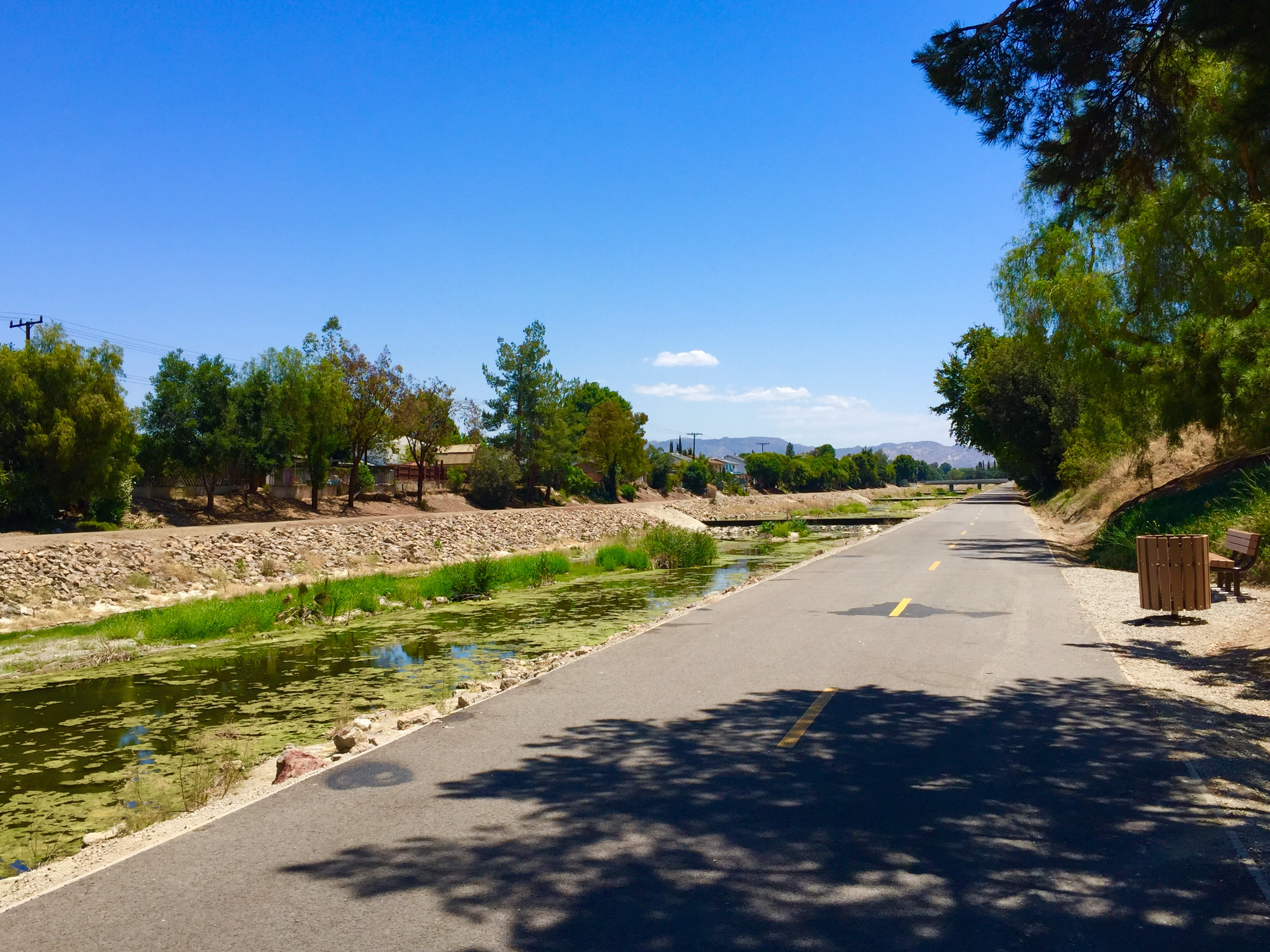
- Arroyo Simi seen from Frontier Park.

Location
- Country: United States

Physical characteristics
- Source
  - location: Corriganville Park, Simi Valley
- Mouth
  - location: Merges with Arroyo Las Posas in Moorpark, discharges to the Pacific by Mugu Lagoon
- Length: 19 mi (31 km)

Basin features
- River system: Calleguas Creek
- Tributaries
  - left: Runkle Canyon- and Bus Canyon Creeks, and Erringer Drain
  - right: Aaamos Canyon-, Dry Canyon-, Tapo Canyon-, Las Llajas Canyon-, and White Oak Creeks, and North Simi Drain

The Arroyo Simi (Spanish for "Small Stream of Simi", sometimes also referred to as Simi Creek) is a 19-mile (31 km) westwards-running creek, located in California, United States, running from the city of Simi Valley and crosses the valley from east to west, before entering the city of Moorpark. It originates at Corriganville Park by the Santa Susana Pass, travels for 12 miles (19 km) through Simi Valley, leaves the city limits of Oak Park at the western end of Simi Valley, continues for seven miles in Moorpark where it merges with Arroyo Las Posas by Hitch Road. It is a tributary to the Calleguas Creek, which enters the Pacific Ocean by its estuary at Mugu Lagoon by Naval Air Station Point Mugu. Arroyo Simi drains an area of 343 square miles in southern Ventura County. In its natural state, it is an ephemeral creek, which is only seasonally filled during winter time and periods of heavy rain. Today it is for the most part a concrete lined water drain that flows year round. Tributaries to the Arroyo Simi include the Alamos, Sycamore, Dry, Tapo, Las Llajas, White Oak, Runkle, and Bus Canyon Creeks, as well as the Erringer Road and North Simi Drains.

Arroyo Simi Greenway is an ongoing construction project by the City of Simi Valley to increase the recreational use of its river parkways. The project includes new paved hiking and biking trails along the Arroyo Simi, exhibit signs, sixteen new trail entries, and more. The area is administered as the Arroyo Simi Bike Path by the Rancho Simi Recreation and Park District (RSRPD). It is home to native flora, fish, and birds. It is home to fish species such as the brown bullhead, green sunfish, bluntnose minnow, and mosquitofish. It is an important habitat for various species of freshwater-nesting birds in the Simi Valley. Some of the species include the great blue heron, white-faced ibis, black-crowned night heron, green heron, black-necked stilt, great egret, snowy egret, belted kingfisher, black phoebe, killdeer, common yellowthroat, greater yellowlegs, American coot, and mallard.
