= Flaming Frontier =

1958 film directed by Sam Newfield

- Theatrical poster
- Directed by: Sam Newfield
- Written by: Louis Stevens
- Produced by: Sam Newfield
- Starring: Bruce Bennett; Jim Davis
- Cinematography: Frederick Ford
- Edited by: Douglas Robertson
- Music by: John Bath
- Production company: Regal Pictures
- Distributed by: 20th Century Fox
- Release date: August 1, 1958
- Running time: 70 minutes
- Countries: Canada; United States
- Language: English

Flaming Frontier is a 1958 Canadian-American Western film produced and directed by Sam Newfield in his final credited feature film, from a screenplay by Louis Stevens. Produced by Regal Pictures in Canada, where Newfield was shooting his Hawkeye and the Last of the Mohicans TV series, it was distributed by 20th Century Fox and opened in August 1958. The film stars Bruce Bennett and Jim Davis.

== Plot ==
When food supplies to the Union forces from the Midwest are interrupted by an Indian uprising, Abraham Lincoln sends Capt. James Huston to intervene. Huston is half-Sioux, and he and the leader of the uprising, Little Crow, grew up as friends. Huston heads to Fort Ridgely in Minnesota, which is under the command of Col. Hugh Carver, who despises the Sioux. Carver's brother, Dan Carver, owns the local trading post, and is one of the leading land dealers in the area. Dan and the local Indian agent, Jeff Baxter, want to exterminate the Sioux so that they can take over their lands to sell it to settlers.

Huston arrives at the fort just in time to stop Running Bear, a Sioux, from being tortured by Col. Carver to reveal Little Crow's location. Carver is infuriated that Huston has been sent to meddle in his command. In addition, Huston meets Mrs. Felice Carver, who is planning to leave her husband, who beats her. There is an instant attraction between Felice and Huston, which only rankles Col. Carver more.

Huston convinces Running Bear to take him and Sgt. Haggerty, one of the Colonel's men, to meet with Little Crow. On their way they are ambushed by two Chippewa Indians. In the ensuing battle, one of the Chippewas is killed, and Running Bear is poisoned by an arrow. Haggerty draws the poison out of Running Bear's wound, and the group continues on to Little Crow's camp. Little Crow lets Huston know that the Sioux are rebelling because Baxter and Dan Carver have been stealing money and supplies meant for the Sioux. Huston gets Little Crow to agree to stop the attacks, with a promise to bring the two white men to justice.

Returning to the fort, Felice confides to Huston that she intends to leave Carver. Meanwhile, giving in to the influence of his brother and Baxter, Col. Carver leads a troop to plunder a Sioux village in retaliation for a fight at the local trading post during which two Indians and three white men, including Baxter's brother, had been killed. When Col. Carver balks at holding a meeting of the local traders where Huston intends to confront the thievery of Baxter and Dan Carver, Huston pulls rank on him, showing him a letter from the Governor giving him the authority to do so. That night, the Colonel, his brother, and Baxter plot to kill Huston, but he is warned by Felice.

Tensions escalate between the Indians and the white settlers, with several battles and ambushes occur. During one such ambush, Col. Carver is shot, and later dies, after which Huston takes charge at the fort. Little Crow demands that Baxter and Carver be turned over to them for justice, but Huston refuses. Little Crow and his followers attempt several attacks on the fort, but are repulsed each time. Worried that the soldiers under Huston's command might take matters into their own hands and turn them over to the Indians, Baxter and Carver escape from the fort. However, they are captured by Little Crow, who has them tortured to death. His anger assuaged with the death of the two thieves, Little Crow calls an end to the hostilities. With his mission successful, Huston takes Felice as his bride.

== Cast ==
(cast list as per AFI database)

- Bruce Bennett as Capt. James Huston
- Jim Davis as Col. Hugh Carver
- Paisley Maxwell as Felice Carver
- Don Garrard as Sgt. Haggerty
- Cecil Linder as Dan Carver
- Peter Humphries as Sgt. Edmundson
- Ben Lennick as Jeff Baxter
- Larry Solway as Chief Little Crow
- Bill Walsh as Gen. Dunn
- Larry Mann as Bradford
- Mike Fitzgerald as Maj. Franklin
- Bob Vanstone as Capt. Carver's sentry
- Shane Rimmer as Running Bear

== Production ==
In August 1957 it was announced that Regal Productions would be shooting two films in Canada: Wolf Dog (originally titled A Boy and His Dog) and The Flaming Frontier. Twentieth Century was set to distribute the pictures, with Sam Newfield at the helm for both. The film is a fictionalized account of the Battle of Fort Ridgely, which occurred in August 1862. Many of the Indian extras who appeared in the film were descended from those who took part in the battle. Most of the picture was filmed in Canada.

Production on the film was completed by the end of January 1958. In late March it was scheduled for release in April, but it was delayed and rescheduled for an August release. It was finally released on August 1, 1958. The film was classified "A-1" by the Legion of Decency, meaning it was suitable for all audiences.

It was partially filmed in Wildwood Regional Park in Thousand Oaks, California.

== Reception ==
Motion Picture Daily gave the film a mediocre review, calling the cast "spirited", with acknowledging the superior performance of Bennett. They did not give Newfield's direction either a positive or negative review, instead saying, "...he strives mightily to incorporate as much vital entertainment values as attainable." Harrison's Reports also was lukewarm to the film, saying the plot was a "cliché-ridden tale", with "few surprises". They felt it would only appeal to "undiscriminating audiences", and the acting and directing lived up to the routine script. They did however, compliment the black and white photography.

== See also ==
- List of American films of 1958
