= Mount Clef Ridge =

Mountain in Ventura County, California, United States

Coordinates: 34°14′04″N 118°53′11″W

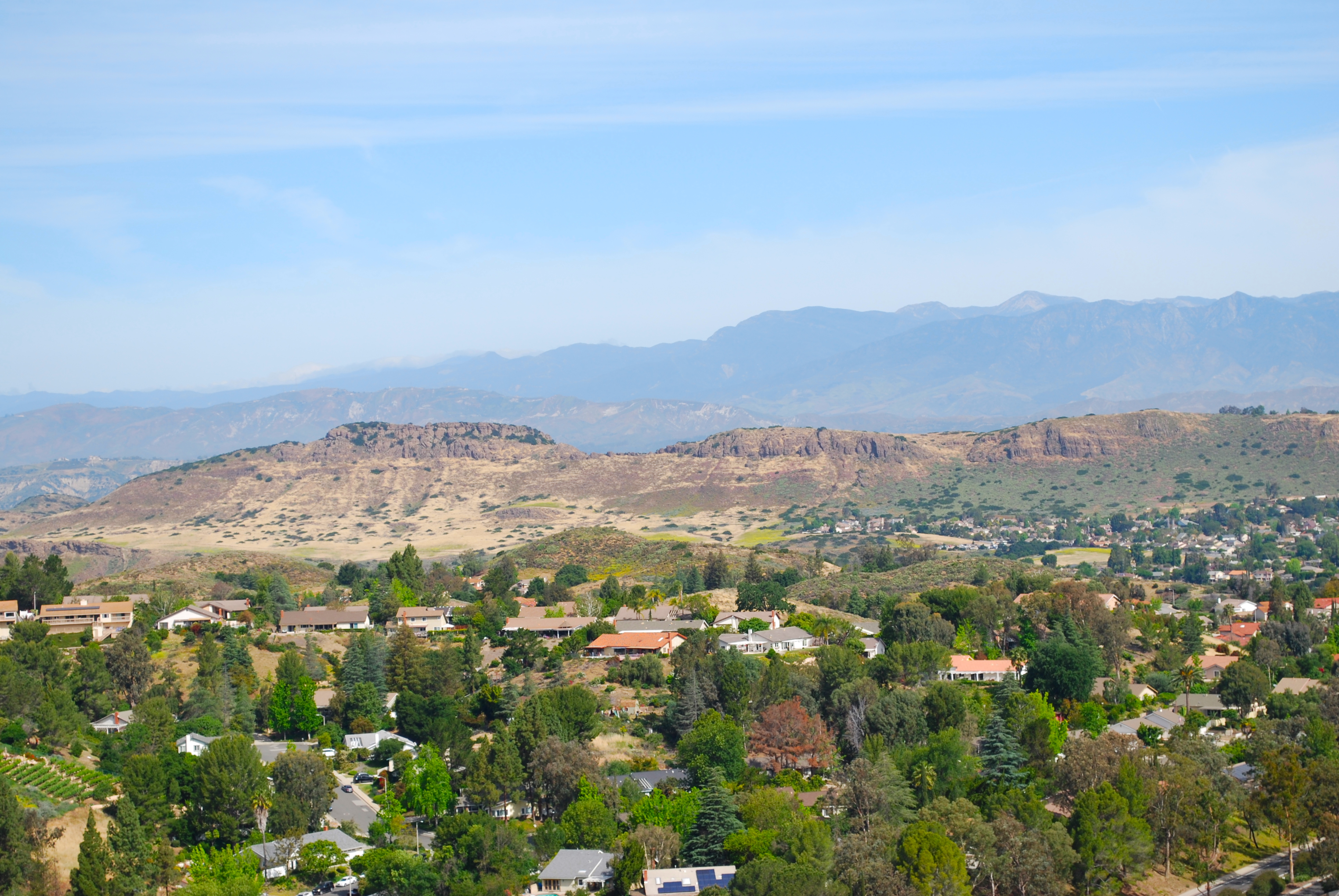
Mount Clef Ridge as seen from Tarantula Hill.

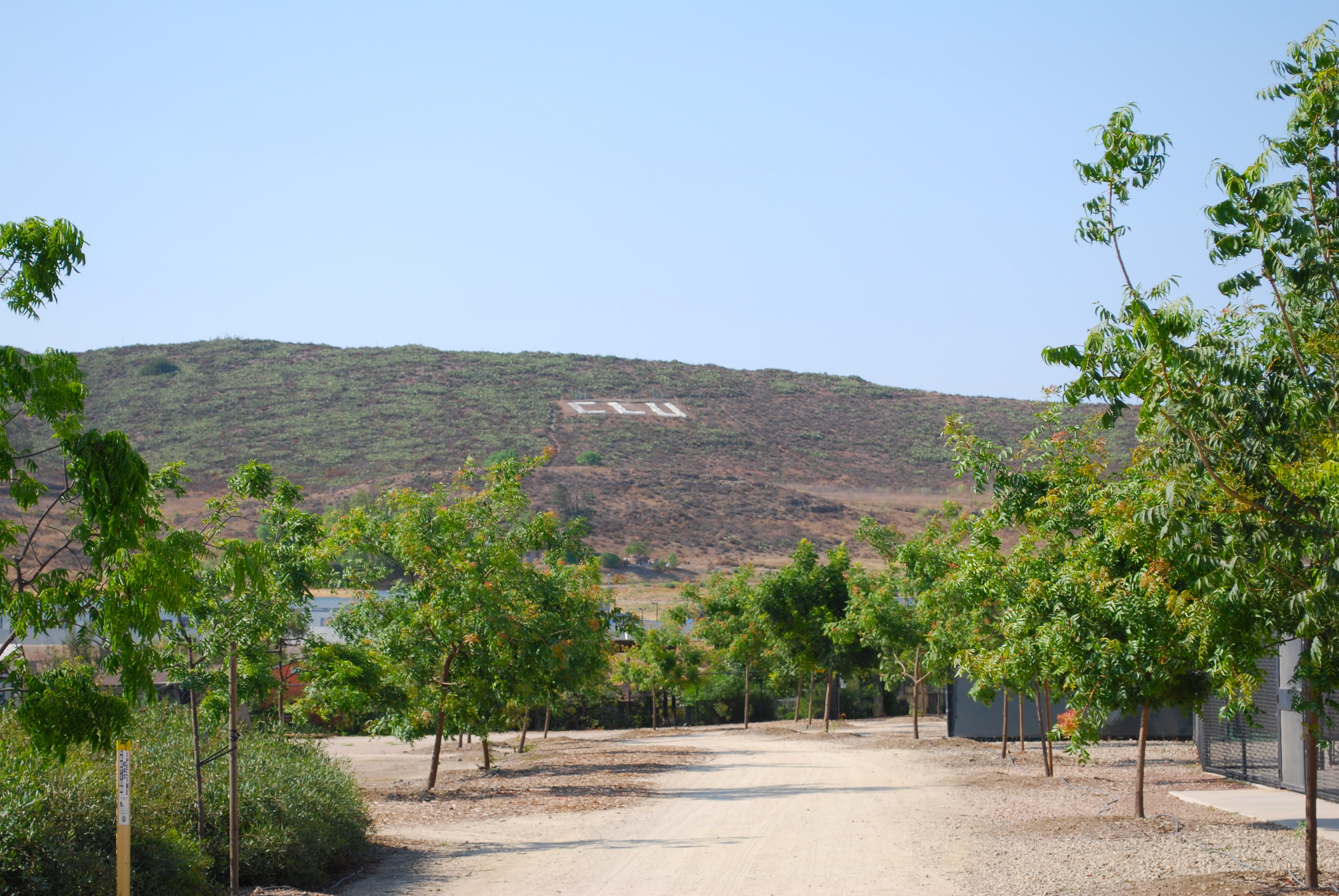
Hillside letters on Mount Clef at the Cal Lutheran campus.

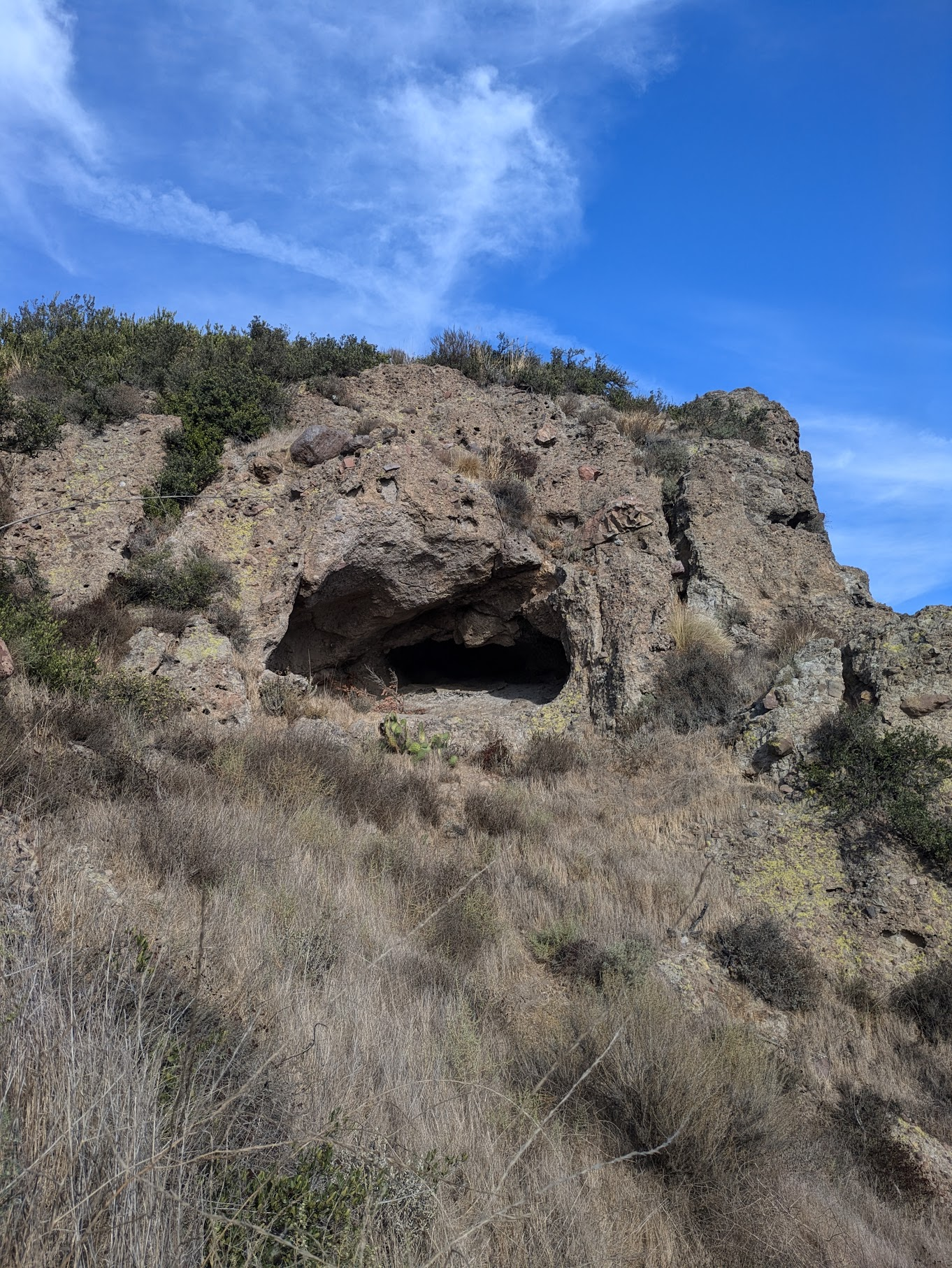
Wildflower Cave on Mount Clef Ridge

Mount Clef Ridge is a 1,076 ft volcanic mountain in Thousand Oaks, California. It is a volcanic outcrop that resulted from lava eruptions 30 million years ago. The ridge was formerly under ownership by the Janss Corporation, but was acquired by the Conejo Recreation and Park District (CRPD) in 1967. Trails here are available from Santa Rosa Valley, Newbury Park and Wildwood Regional Park. Although being a major feature of Wildwood, it occupies its own open-space area bordering Wildwood's northern boundaries. Mount Clef Ridge Open Space Area occupies 212 acres. From the ridge are great panoramic views of Santa Rosa Valley, Conejo Valley, Hill Canyon, as well as the Santa Susana-, Santa Monica- and Topatopa Mountains. The open-space area is home to plants such as coastal sage scrub, chaparral, Lyon's pentachaeta and Conejo dudleya. The fauna includes mountain lions, deer, coyotes, gray foxes, and more.

Mount Clef Ridge was featured in the film Flaming Star (1960) starring Elvis Presley. The horse training scenes in Dark Victory (1939) starring Ronald Reagan also features sequences by the ridge. An army was storming off Mount Clef Ridge in the film Spartacus (1960). The ridge was also featured in Wuthering Heights (1939), where the ridge dubbed for Peniston Crag, England.

A rock shelter, known as Wildflower Cave, is located here and was utilized for shelter by the Chumash people in pre-colonial times. It is frequently used as a spot to smoke marijuana and consume alcoholic beverages, particularly by California Lutheran University students. The cave is hidden from view from all trails in Wildwood Regional Park and has no trails leading up to it. One can find it with enough exploration by finding one of the many unmarked routes. However, these are dangerous as many require rock climbing or traversing through very unstable terrain.

The ridge is named in honor of the California Lutheran Education Foundation (CLEF), which worked to establish California Lutheran University in the 1950s.

The ridgeline extends from the Norwegian Grade westwards to Wildwood Regional Park. A rock formation that spells out "CLU" can be found atop Mount Clef on the campus of California Lutheran University, and a 30-foot cross is located just east of the landmark letters. The cross was made from old telephone poles. This part of the ridge, Dr. Rudy Edmund Living Laboratory, was dedicated on May 5, 2003, in order to enhance student research in biology and geology at the university. Ecological field studies also take place here. The area's namesake, CLU professor Rudy Edmund, published extensively on the need to preserve Mount Clef Ridge.

== See also ==
- Wildwood Regional Park
