= Arroyo Conejo Open Space =

Park in Ventura County, California, United States

- La Branca (the Barranca)
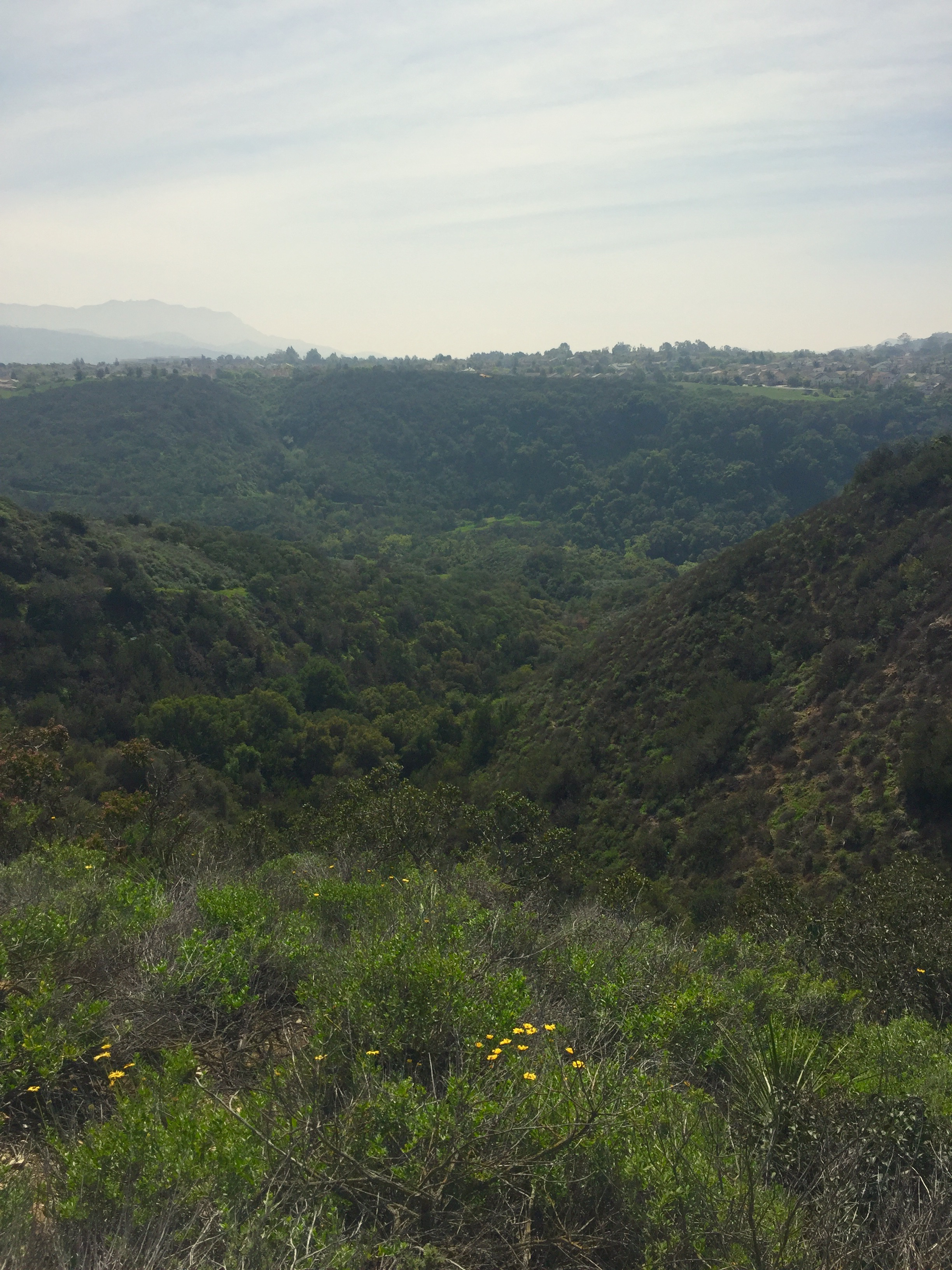
- View of La Branca from the Arroyo Conejo Trail

- Location within California Location within the United States
- Location: Ventura County, California
- Nearest city: Newbury Park
- Coordinates: 34°12′39.5″N 118°55′37.4″W
- Area: 302 acres (122 ha)
- Established: July 1977
- Governing body: Conejo Open Space Conservation Agency (COSCA)

Arroyo Conejo Open Space is a 302-acre (122 ha) open space reserve in the western Simi Hills in northern Newbury Park, Ventura County, California. Most of it is part of the 250-acre (100 ha) Arroyo Conejo Nature Preserve (sometimes shortened to the Arroyo Nature Preserve).

== Geography ==
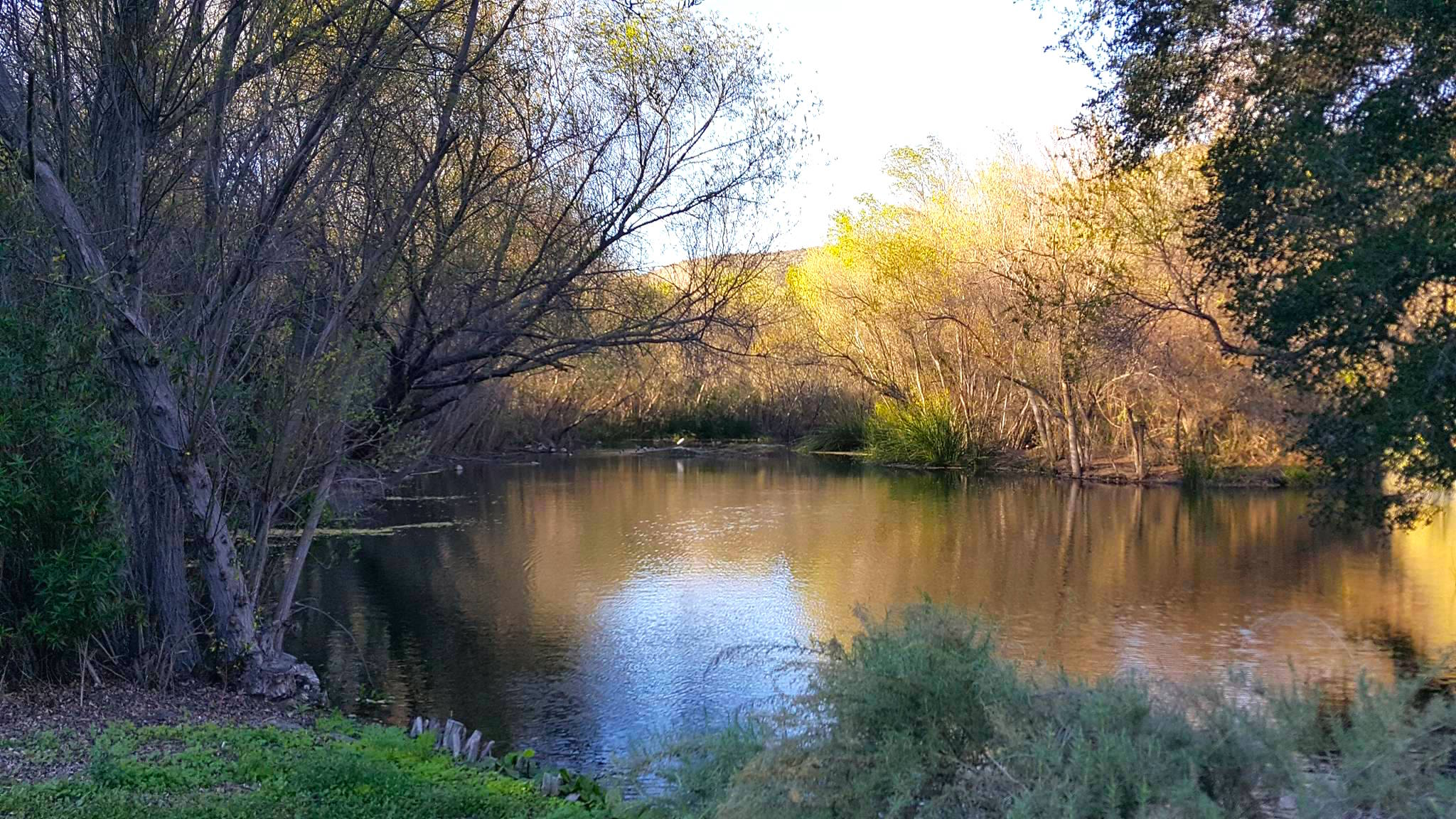
Hill Canyon Wastewater Treatment Plant's constructed wetlands in Hill Canyon

The preserve is often locally referred to as La Branca or the Barranca (Spanish for "the canyon"), and is nicknamed the Grand Canyon of the Conejo Valley. Its stated purpose is "the preservation of the scenic areas, natural habitats, wildlife, archaeological and paleontological sites of the Conejo Valley and surroundings, specifically including the Arroyo Conejo". It contains 250 acres of land and has been administrated and owned by the Conejo Open Space Conservation Agency (COSCA) since its incorporation in July 1977. La Branca is a narrow ravine or gorge that runs three miles from northern Newbury Park near the Rancho Conejo Playfields, to Hill Canyon near the Hill Canyon Wastewater Treatment Plant in the Conejo Canyons Open Space.

La Branca has a gorge section with cliffs rising up to 300 feet (91 m). The preserve is home to large variety of plant- and animal species, including for instance southwestern pond turtles, mountain lions, bobcats, black bears, deer, coyotes, and avifauna such as quails, golden eagles, hawks, owls, and numerous others. It contains the perennial South Fork of the Arroyo Conejo, riparian zone vegetation, steep-sided canyons, California oak woodlands, as well as wetlands.

=== Wetlands ===
The Hill Canyon Wastewater Treatment Plant has the largest constructed wetlands in Ventura County, within approximately 15 acres (6.1 ha) of the Arroyo Conejo Nature Preserve. Natures Image has helped create this area by removal of invasive plant species, as well as the planting of 1,600 native trees, 7,000 emergent marsh plants, 6,000 low herbaceous wetland plants, and 1,200 riparian scrub plants. The area is home to the endemic Southwestern Pond Turtle, as well as large numbers of mallards, coots, herons, and numerous other species of freshwater fish and birds.

== History ==
The nature preserve was highlighted in the Conservation Element of the General Plan in 1972 and later identified in the City's Conejo Canyons Study of 1976 as an area with particularly sensitive and important resources. The president of the Conejo Valley Audubon Society met with representatives from The Nature Conservancy in 1974. One visitor during these meetings mentioned how incredible it was to "find such a primordial setting within the city limits of a Los Angeles bedroom community." On July 1, 1976, the Thousand Oaks-based News-Chronicle reported the formation of a Small Wilderness Area Preserves chapter to protect donated Canyon lands. Arroyo Conejo Nature Preserve was incorporated and organized in lieu of the Small Wilderness Group in July 1977.

== See also ==
- Wildwood Regional Park
- Conejo Canyons Open Space
- Simi Hills topics
