= Flaming Star =

1960 film by Don Siegel

- Film poster
- Directed by: Don Siegel
- Written by: Clair Huffaker; Nunnally Johnson
- Based on: novel Flaming Lance by Clair Huffaker
- Produced by: David Weisbart
- Starring: Elvis Presley; Barbara Eden; Dolores del Río; Steve Forrest; John McIntire
- Cinematography: Charles G. Clarke
- Edited by: Hugh S. Fowler
- Music by: Cyril J. Mockridge and Elvis Presley
- Distributed by: 20th Century Fox
- Release date: December 16, 1960 (New York)
- Running time: 92 minutes
- Country: United States
- Language: English
- Budget: $1.7 million
- Box office: $2 million (US/ Canada)

Flaming Star is a 1960 American Western film starring Elvis Presley, Barbara Eden, and Steve Forrest, based on the book Flaming Lance (1958) by Clair Huffaker. Critics agreed that Presley gave one of his better acting performances as the mixed-blood "Pacer Burton", a dramatic role. The film was directed by Don Siegel and had a working title of Black Star.

The film reached number 12 on the box-office charts.

It was filmed in Utah and Los Angeles, as well as in Wildwood Regional Park in Thousand Oaks, California. A road near Wildwood in Thousand Oaks has been named Flaming Star Avenue after the film.

== Plot ==
Pacer Burton is the son of a Kiowa mother and a Texan father working as a rancher. His family, including a half-brother, Clint, live a typical life on the Texan frontier. Life becomes anything but typical when a nearby tribe of Kiowa begin raiding neighboring homesteads. Soon after, Clint and Pacer are asked to choose sides, however Pacer is torn between his Native American heritage and his white roots. Many of the whites at The Crossing want nothing to do with the Burtons, even preventing the doctor from leaving the town to help Neddy, Pacer's mother, when she is badly wounded. The Kiowa Chief, Buffalo Horn, promises the Burtons safety if Pacer will join him on the warpath, adamant to not have a half Kiowa man stand against him. When Neddy passes due to the doctor arriving too late, Pacer chooses to join the Kiowa in the upcoming fight. Despite attempting to act as a peacemaker through most of the events and eventually saying he will join the Kiowa, Pacer is mortally wounded attempting to protect his loved ones and community. Knowing his presence will only bring more danger and harm, Pacer willingly lets go, descending into his own death.

== Cast ==
- Elvis Presley as Pacer Burton
- Barbara Eden as Roslyn Pierce
- Steve Forrest as Clint Burton
- Dolores del Río as Neddy Burton
- John McIntire as Sam "Pa" Burton
- L. Q. Jones as Tom Howard
- Douglas Dick as Will Howard
- Richard Jaeckel as Angus Pierce
- Rodolfo Acosta as Buffalo Horn
- Karl Swenson as Dred Pierce
- Ford Rainey as Doc Phillips

== Production ==
=== Development ===
The film was based on Clair Huffaker's novel Flaming Lance, which was published in 1958.

Film rights were purchased by 20th Century Fox and Nunally Johnson was assigned to write the script. It was originally titled The Brothers of Flaming Arrow, then Flaming Lance. In May 1958, Fox announced that a film version would start shooting the following month. Johnson later recalled that the studio "said they couldn't make it because it would cost too much for a Western and a Western couldn't get in as much as it would cost, something like that."

Huffaker was asked to make rewrites. "I took two weeks rewriting the script and only ten days of the book," he said. "I hate to say it, but in rewriting the script, I think it makes a better story than my original."

Frank Sinatra and Marlon Brando were originally slated to play the brothers before Fox decided to cast Presley in the lead role. Presley's previous film, G.I. Blues, had been a success at the box office and had led to one of his best-selling albums. Determined to be taken seriously as an actor, though, Presley asked for roles with fewer songs.

"Physically he's right," said producer David Weisbart, who had produced Presley's first film, Love Me Tender. "His Army training and the athletic interests he picked up there have left him in superb condition. He probably always was graceful... but now his grace is trained and refined and developed. What's more his slight Mississippi accent is no problem in a film set in West Texas."

Director Don Siegel shot tests with Presley wearing dark contact lenses, but decided that they detracted from Presley's acting too much and discarded them.

Fox insisted on the addition of four songs. "We aren't courageous enough to present him without any songs at all," said Weisbart. "We've spotted them [the songs] where they'd come in naturally," said Weisbart. " At a frontier party, at an encampment, and during a horseback ride over the plains."

Fox wanted a theme song, so Huffaker changed the title to Black Star, which he felt would be more fitting for a song than Flaming Lance would be. He concocted an old Indian legend about a black star. "It was OK to change the title and have a song written about a star," he said.

Presley recorded a theme song, but it was later rerecorded as "Flaming Star", using the same words and melody. RCA released Presley's recording of the song in its original "Black Star" version in 1991, and scholar Chris O'Leary suggests that recording may have influenced David Bowie's final album, 2016's Blackstar.

Flaming Star was initially to include four songs. Siegel wished that Presley not appear "professional" in those scenes: "He should have an awkwardness and an absence of the Presley mannerisms." Eventually, Presley demanded that two songs be removed, leaving just the title song and a short number at the opening birthday party scene. Despite Presley's aforementioned desire to make films with fewer songs, this would be the last of his films to have a minimal number of songs until the 1969 release, Charro!, coincidentally his next western, had only a title song featured.

Johnson was contacted when abroad by Huffaker, who had written the original novel. He told Johnson that Presley was cast and wanted know if Johnson objected to Huffaker having credit on the script. "I'd always objected to that, but I couldn't say no to the guy," said Johnson. "He didn't do anything, as he admitted. I was wondering what in God's name they would do with Elvis Presley in this. All they did was put in a kind of a hoedown dance and Presley sang a song at the opening and then they went right on into the picture."

=== Shooting ===
Filming started in August 1960. Parts of the film were shot in Delle, Lone Rock, and Skull Valley in Utah. Filming also took place at Rancho El Conejo in Thousand Oaks, California.

Barbara Steele, originally signed to play the love interest, was replaced during filming by Barbara Eden after studio executives decided that Steele's British accent was too pronounced, though Steele claims that she had quit.

== Reception ==
=== Box office ===
The film was released only one month after G.I. Blues, but did not achieve the same degree of box-office success, reaching number 12 on the Variety box-office survey for the year.

=== Critical reception ===
The film received generally positive reviews, with a few critics lauding Presley's performance and noting his improvement as an actor. A. H. Weiler of The New York Times praised the film as "an unpretentious but sturdy Western that takes the time, the place and the people seriously." Variety called the plot "disturbingly familiar and not altogether convincing, but the film, attractively mounted and consistently diverting, will entertain and absorb the audience it is tailored for."

Harrison's Reports graded it "Very good," calling Presley "believable" and John McIntire "a powerful figure." Charles Stinson of the Los Angeles Times appraised the film as "standard for its type — the half-breed tragedy — but done well enough to head a program double bill." Stinson wrote of Presley that "he seems to be improving noticeably with every film. He has, of course, rather a distance yet to go to dramatic power and polish. But 'Flaming Star' and 'G.I. Blues' are a long way up from 'Jailhouse Rock.'" Richard L. Coe of The Washington Post criticized the film for "flat, one-syllable dialogue" and "ruthless predictability," though he found some of the outdoor shots "handsome."

The Monthly Film Bulletin wrote that although the film "never really gets beyond the comic-strip weepie stage," director Siegel "has managed to communicate considerable excitement through flashes of imaginative cutting and handsome composition, notably in the first Indian attack, and in some realistically staged fight, chase and battle passages ... But Siegel's main achievement is his direction of Elvis Presley, still basically not an actor, but no longer a joke as a screen personality. Given the full, virile build-up, he plays the half-breed with a brooding presence that is surprisingly effective."

Johnson eventually saw the film and said he "liked it very much." He thought Siegel "did a first-rate job and also Presley did."

Quentin Tarantino later called the film "a truly great '50s Western, and maybe the most brutally violent American Western of its era."

=== Effect on some African countries and territories ===
According to an Associated Press report from Johannesburg dated May 31, 1961, South Africans were initially not permitted to see the film. The government, which had strict laws to keep the races separate, banned the picture that same day because Presley "played the son of an American Indian woman and a white man." A day later, 20th Century Fox appealed, convincing the South Africa Board of Censors to lift the ban as long as it would not be shown to the country's indigenous population. The film then opened to segregated theaters, starting in Durban in early June. However, it was permanently banned in cinemas in Kenya, Uganda, and Tanzania, as colonial government officials in those British territories were concerned that the movie could reignite racial tensions in the aftermath of the recent Mau Mau uprising.

=== Artistic legacy/Andy Warhol silkscreens ===
A publicity still from the film was used by Andy Warhol to create several silkscreens, among them numerous versions of "Single Elvis", "Double Elvis", "Elvis x 2" and "Elvis I and I", as well as an "Eight Elvises", and at least four "Triple Elvis" paintings, an "Elvis 4 Times" and the largest, "Elvis Times Eleven", which is currently housed at the Andy Warhol Museum in Pittsburgh. Sales generated by at least 11 of these silkscreens through auction houses or in private sales are, as of May 13, 2021, in excess of $380 million.

== Home media ==
The film was released on videocassette by Key Video in February 1985 as part of the release of 11 videos to mark the 50th anniversary of Presley's birth. It has also been released internationally on DVD and Blu-ray disc.

== See also ==
- List of American films of 1960
- Elvis Presley on film and television
- Elvis Presley discography
- List of most expensive paintings
