= Oak Park (Simi Valley, California) =

Park in California, United States

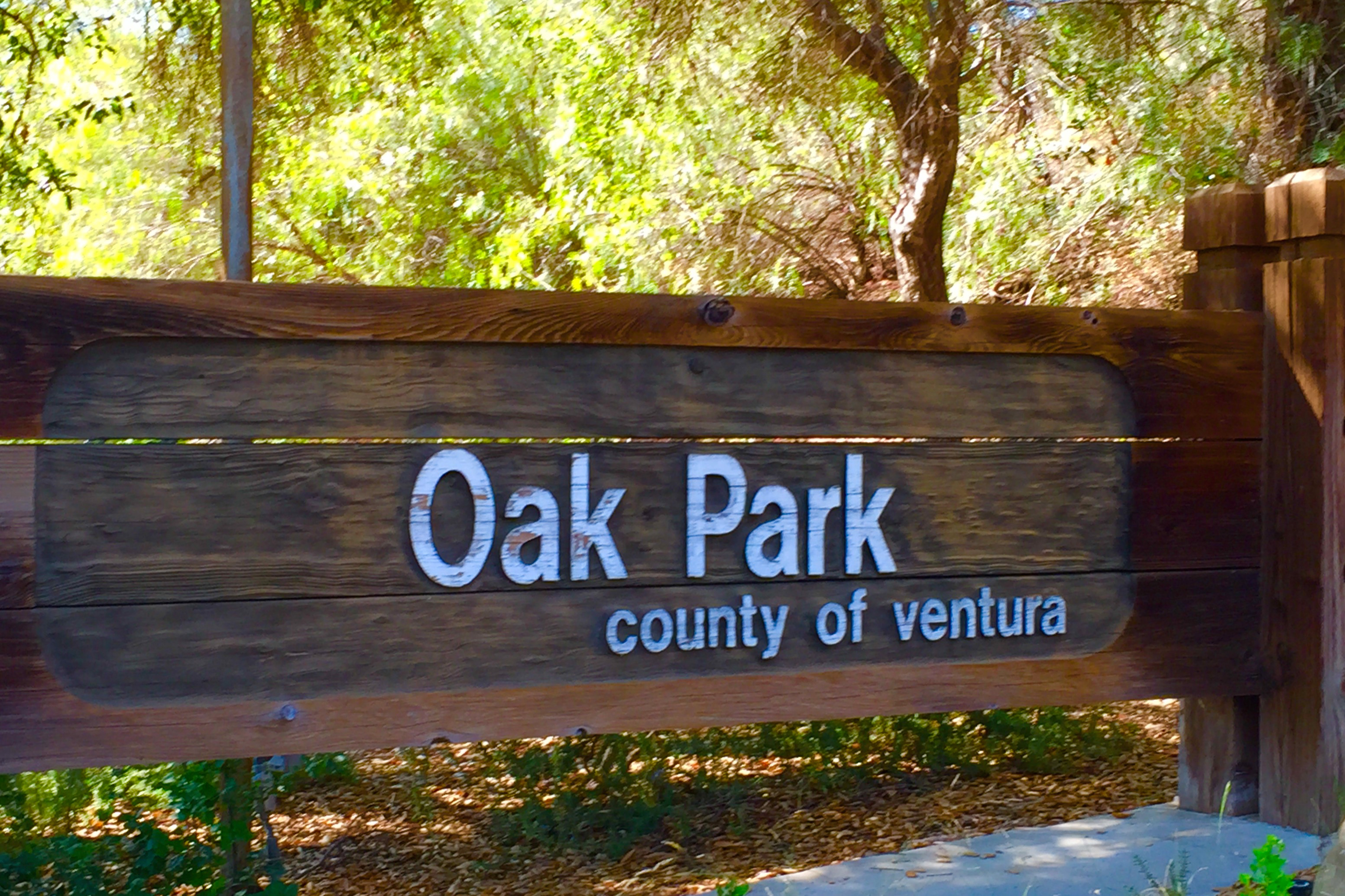
- Sign at entrance.
- Interactive map of Oak Park
- Type: Open space park
- Location: Simi Valley, CA
- Coordinates: 34°17′19″N 118°49′21″W
- Area: 100.5 acres (40.7 ha)
- Operator: Santa Monica Mountains Conservancy
- Status: Open daily 7:30 am - 8:00 pm during summer.

Oak Park is a 100.5-acre (40.7 ha) open space regional park located at 901 Quisma Drive in Simi Valley, California, near Moorpark and California State Route 118. This county park, maintained by the Santa Monica Mountains Conservancy, is situated in the foothill country surrounded by rolling hills in the extreme west Simi Valley. Oak Park is recognized for its many large oak trees, rolling hills, canyons, wildlife, and hiking trails through abundance of coastal scrub brush. The facilities offered are a playground, horseshoe pits, basketball court, picnic tables, restroom, dump station for RV's, water fountain, BBQ, fire rings, as well as tent- and RV-camping. Oak Park is a reservation only park with a 2 night minimum. There are partial hookups and 30 amp service at 16 campsites in 2018 for tents or RV's, a 16 space rv group camping area and one group tent site area for up to fifty people. There are 4-day use group areas. There are occasionally summer programs in the camping site area. The park is home to various native flora and also wildlife, which consists of a wide range of Simi Valley native species such as numerous raptors, sagebrush lizards, alligator lizards, roadrunners, hummingbirds, grey foxes, bobcats, raccoons, opossums, skunks, and various snakes, including the Southern Pacific Rattlesnake and California Kingsnake. The park district is in the process of acquiring the 734-acre (297 ha) Alamos Canyon on the other side of West Los Angeles Avenue. A trail connecting Oak Park to the Alamos Canyon would be created and included within a greenbelt between the cities of Simi Valley and Moorpark.

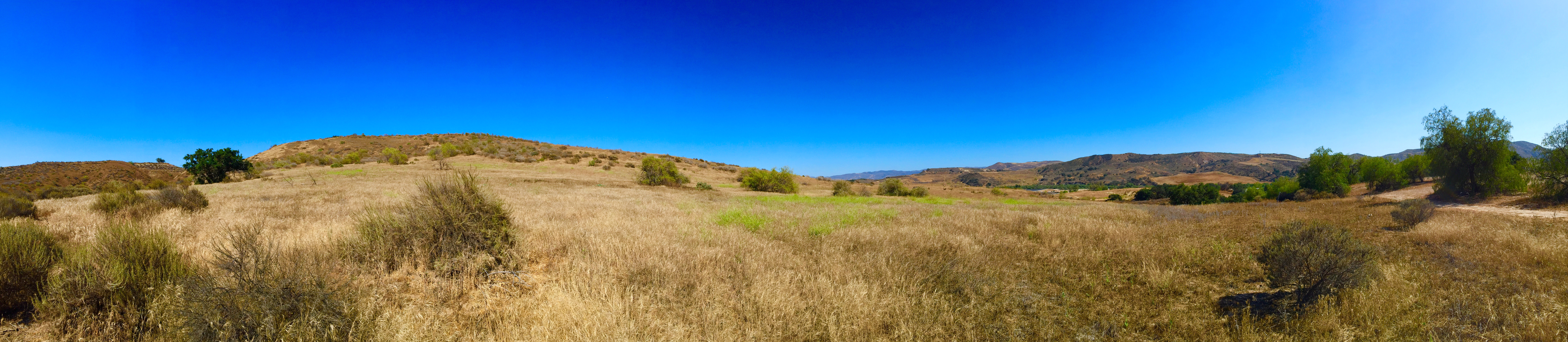
View from a trail in Oak Park, Simi Valley
