= Calleguas Creek =

Creek in Ventura County, California, US

Coordinates: 34°05′53″N 119°05′24″W

Calleguas Creek (/kɑːˈjeɪ.ɡəs/; Chumash: Kayïwïsh, meaning "the head") is the terminus of a river system in Ventura County, California. It drains the Calleguas Creek Watershed, an area 30 miles long and 14 miles wide (343 square miles), which includes Simi Valley, Moorpark, Camarillo and a large portion of Thousand Oaks. Tributaries include Arroyo Simi, Arroyo Santa Rosa, Revolon Slough and Arroyo Conejo. It discharges into the Pacific Ocean, the Santa Barbara Channel, at Mugu Lagoon on Naval Base Ventura County, just north of Point Mugu, where the Santa Monica Mountains meet the ocean, marking the southern/eastern boundary of the Oxnard Plain.

In 2009, Calleguas Creek was named the most polluted body of water in the jurisdiction of the Los Angeles Regional Water Quality Control Board. Pollution along the river system has been an issue for decades.
