= Wildwood Regional Park =

Regional park in California, US

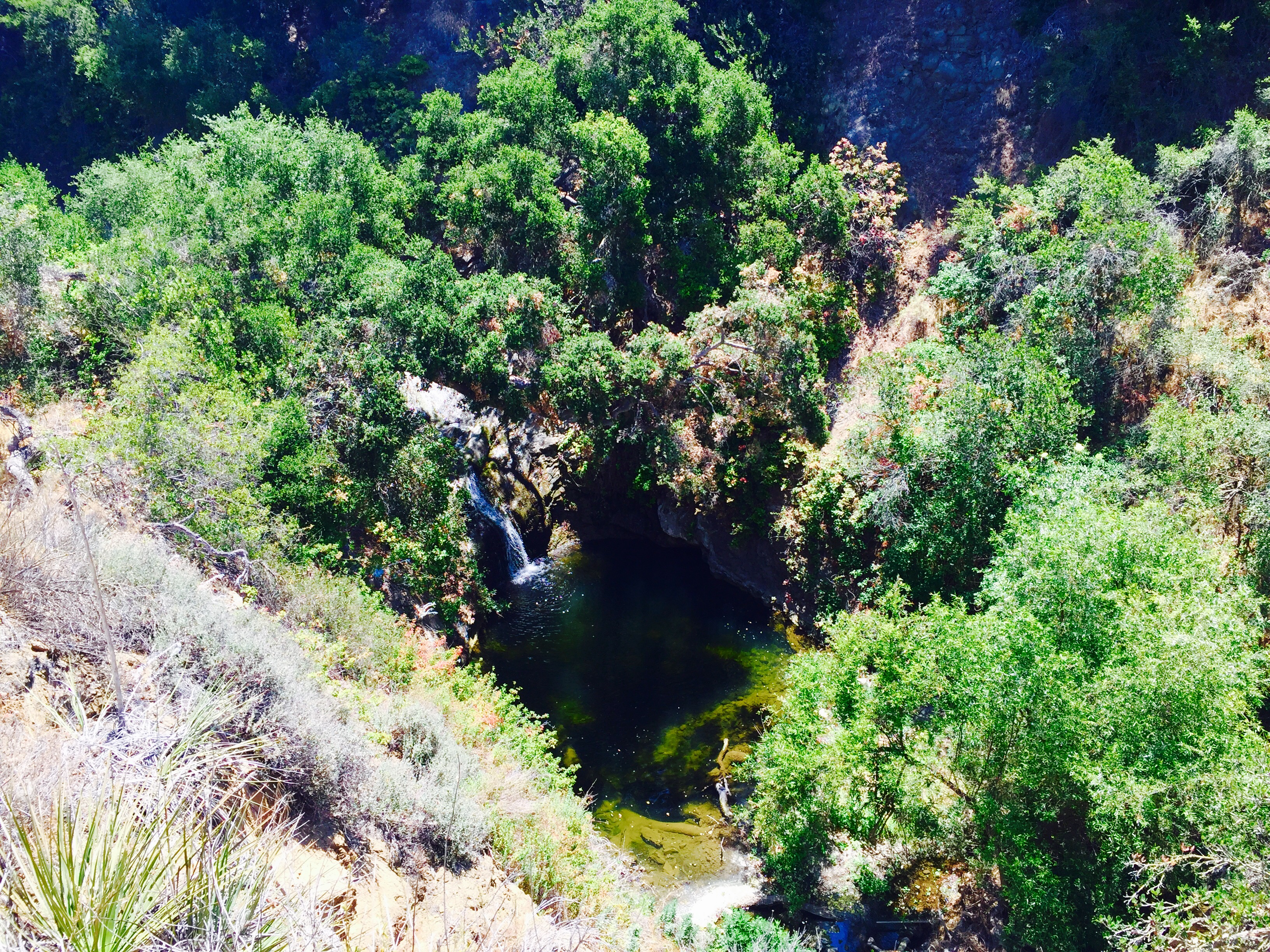
- Little Falls waterfall.
- Interactive map of Wildwood Regional Park
- Type: Regional park
- Location: Simi Hills and Conejo Valley, Ventura County, California
- Coordinates: 34°13′15″N 118°54′40″W
- Area: 1,765 acres (7.14 km^{2})
- Created: 1967
- Operator: Conejo Open Space Conservation Agency (COSCA)
- Status: Open

Wildwood Regional Park is a suburban regional park in the western Simi Hills and Conejo Valley, in Ventura County, California. It is located in western Thousand Oaks, northern Newbury Park, and southern Moorpark.

Wildwood is home to over 27 miles (43 km) of hiking trails. The four principle trails are the Mesa-, Moonridge-, Wildwood Canyon- and Santa Rosa Trails. Over 250 plant species have been recorded in Wildwood, as well as 37 species of mammals, 70 bird species, and 22 species of amphibians and reptiles.

The park consists of 1,765 acres (7.14 km^{2}), and is connected to adjacent open-space areas comprising an additional 1,400 acres (5.7 km^{2}). The park is operated by the Conejo Open Space Conservation Agency (COSCA).

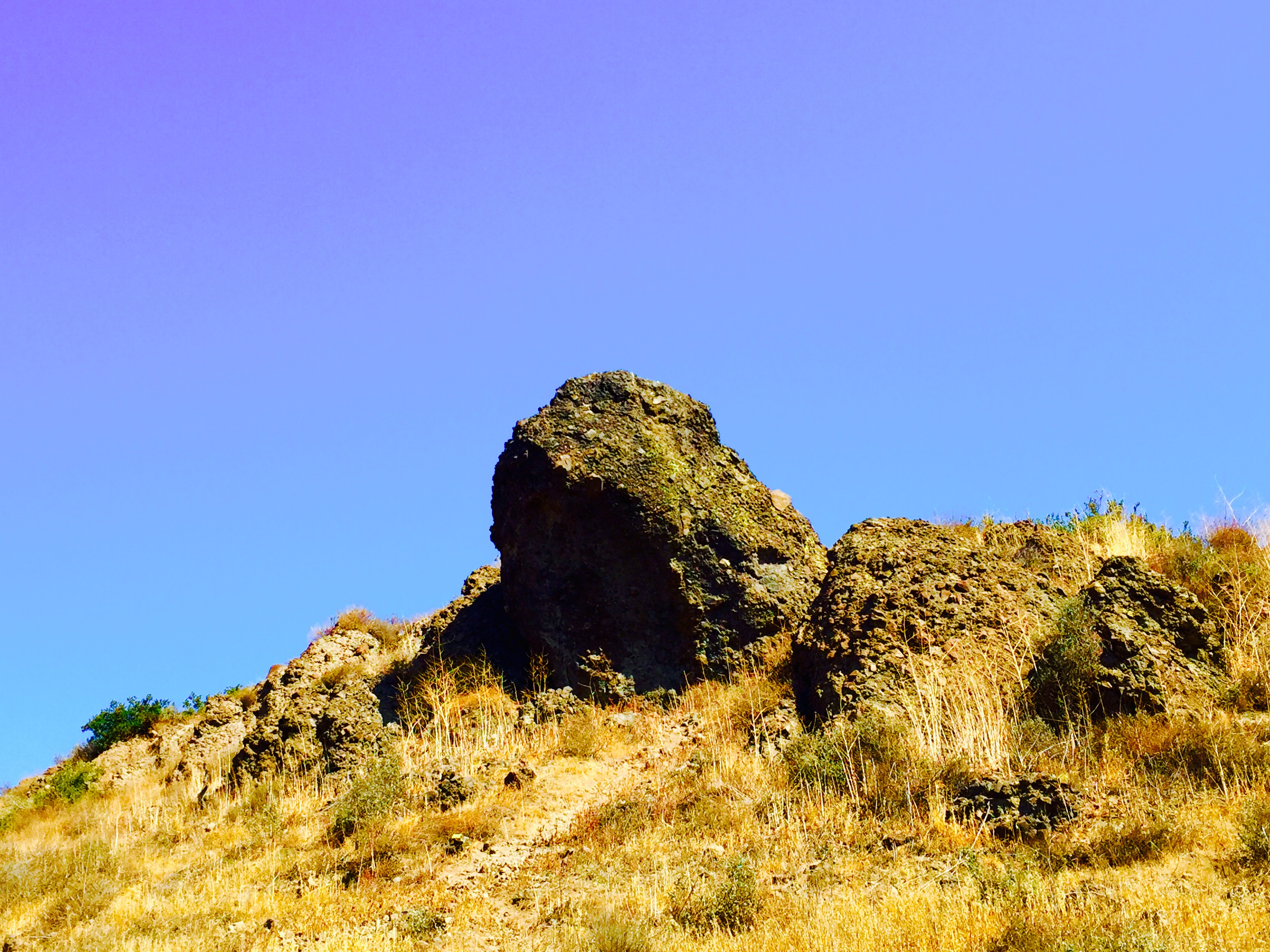
Lizard Rock, in western Wildwood Park.

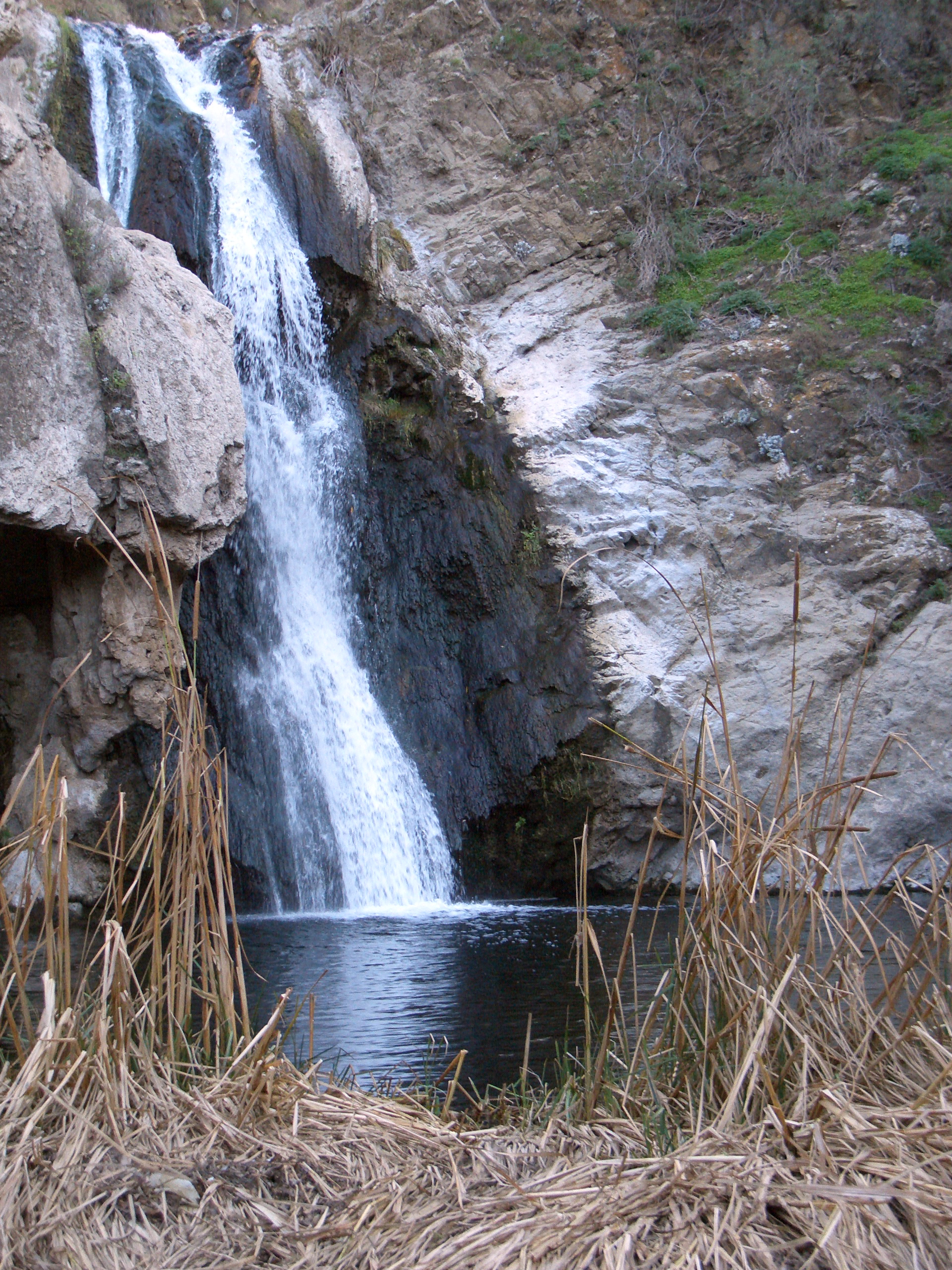
Paradise Falls.

== History ==
The area was home to the Chumash people for more than 8,000 years − before it became a part of the Rancho El Conejo Spanish land grant in 1803, during the colonial Alta California era. There are numerous archeological sites. Some of the artifacts discovered here include stone tools, shell beads and arrowheads. A Chumash village known as Yitimasɨh was located where Wildwood Elementary School sits today. Wildflower Cave (Ven-486) is near Mount Clef Ridge and was used for shelter by the Chumash people in pre-colonial times.

Sheep and cattle grazed the area for much of the 19th- and early 20th century. It was also used as a movie ranch (Janss Conejo Ranch) for the Hollywood film industry from the 1930s through the 1960s. Various wild west movies were filmed here. Television series were also filmed here, such as Bonanza, Dodge City, Gunsmoke, The Rifleman, Flaming Star, The Big Valley and Wagon Train. The park is still occasionally utilized as a filming location for contemporary TV series and commercials.

The park was created in 1967 when the Conejo Recreation and Park District (CRPD) acquired Mount Clef Ridge and Wildwood Canyon from the Janss Investment Company land developers. It was merged with Wildwood Mesa Park in 1987 and is now administrated and operated by the Conejo Open Space Conservation Agency (COSCA), which is a joint organization by the Conejo Recreation and Park District (CRPD) and the City of Thousand Oaks.

Restrictions were put in place for Paradise Falls during the COVID-19 pandemic due to crowded conditions in which people were unable to social distance and also the resulting litter and human waste that was left behind.

== Features ==
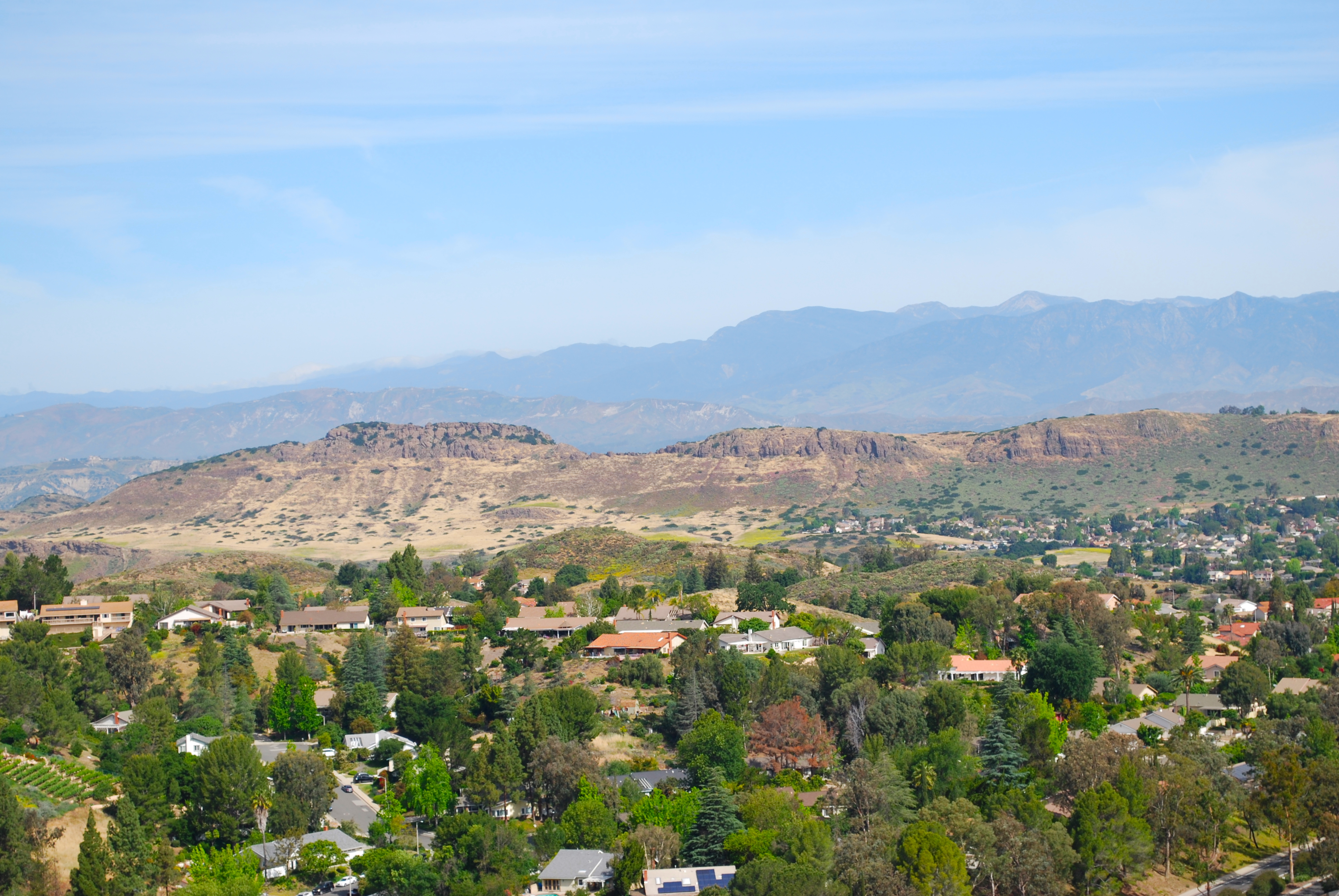
Mount Clef Ridge is a recognizable trademark of Wildwood.

The park offers recreational outdoor activities, including hiking, mountain biking, jogging, horseback riding, picnicking, educational tours, interpretive programs, camping, and wildlife viewing.

Some of the popular attractions in the park include the 70 feet (21 m) cascade of Paradise Falls, as well as the Arroyo Conejo Creek and creek-bed, the large wooden teepee, the Nature Center and Little Cave. The Lizard Rock formation is a serrate volcanic outcropping in the Mount Clef Ridge.

At Lizard Rock, Teepee Overlook, and similar higher elevation areas, there are panoramic views of the Conejo Valley.

=== Attractions ===
Points of interest include:

- Arroyo Conejo: Creek, creekbed, and gorge.
- Paradise Falls: year-round 70-ft. cascade in a steep gorge.
- Little Falls: one of two year-round waterfalls.
- Lizard Rock: serrate volcanic outcropping resembling a lizard.
- Mount Clef Ridge: volcanic-rock outcropping and wildlife corridor. Featured in films such as Flaming Star, Dark Victory, Spartacus, Wuthering Heights, and others.
- Little Cave
- Nature Center (Meadows Cave)
- Teepee Overlook: large wooden teepee on a knoll.
- Fort Wildwood: log fort located at the opening of the park near Avenida De Los Arboles and Lynn Road. The fort has long been removed and a trail marker put in its place.

=== Trails ===
The park is home to 14 nature trails covering over 27 miles (43 km).

Among the most popular hiking trails are the 2.5-mile (4.0 km) Mesa Trail Loop, 3-mile (4.8 km) Lizard Rock Trail, 3-mile (4.8 km) Moonridge Trail, 3-mile (4.8 km) Paradise Falls Trail, 3-mile (4.8 km) Two Springs Trail, 4-mile (6.4 km) Wildwood Park Loop, 6-mile (9.7 km) Lower Butte Trail Loop, 6-mile (9.7 km) Lynnmere Trail, 6.3-mile (10.1 km) Santa Rosa Trail (going to the hills by California Lutheran University), 6.5-mile (10.5 km) Santa Rosa Loop, and the 7-mile (11 km) Hill Canyon Trail.

For the main park entrance, from the Lynn Road exit on the 101 Freeway (Ventura Freeway) and take Lynn Road northbound for 2.5 miles (4.0 km) to Avenida de Los Arboles. Then turn left and continue for 0.9 miles (1.4 km) to the end of the street at Big Sky Drive. There are numerous other trailheads, including: by 398 Briar Bluff Court, 2601 San Miguel Circle, 930 Lynnmere Drive, and 2629 Velarde Drive in Thousand Oaks; by 11121 Rocky High Road in Santa Rosa Valley; by 11160 Sumac Lane in Camarillo, as well as in Newbury Park on the west and Moorpark in Box Canyon.

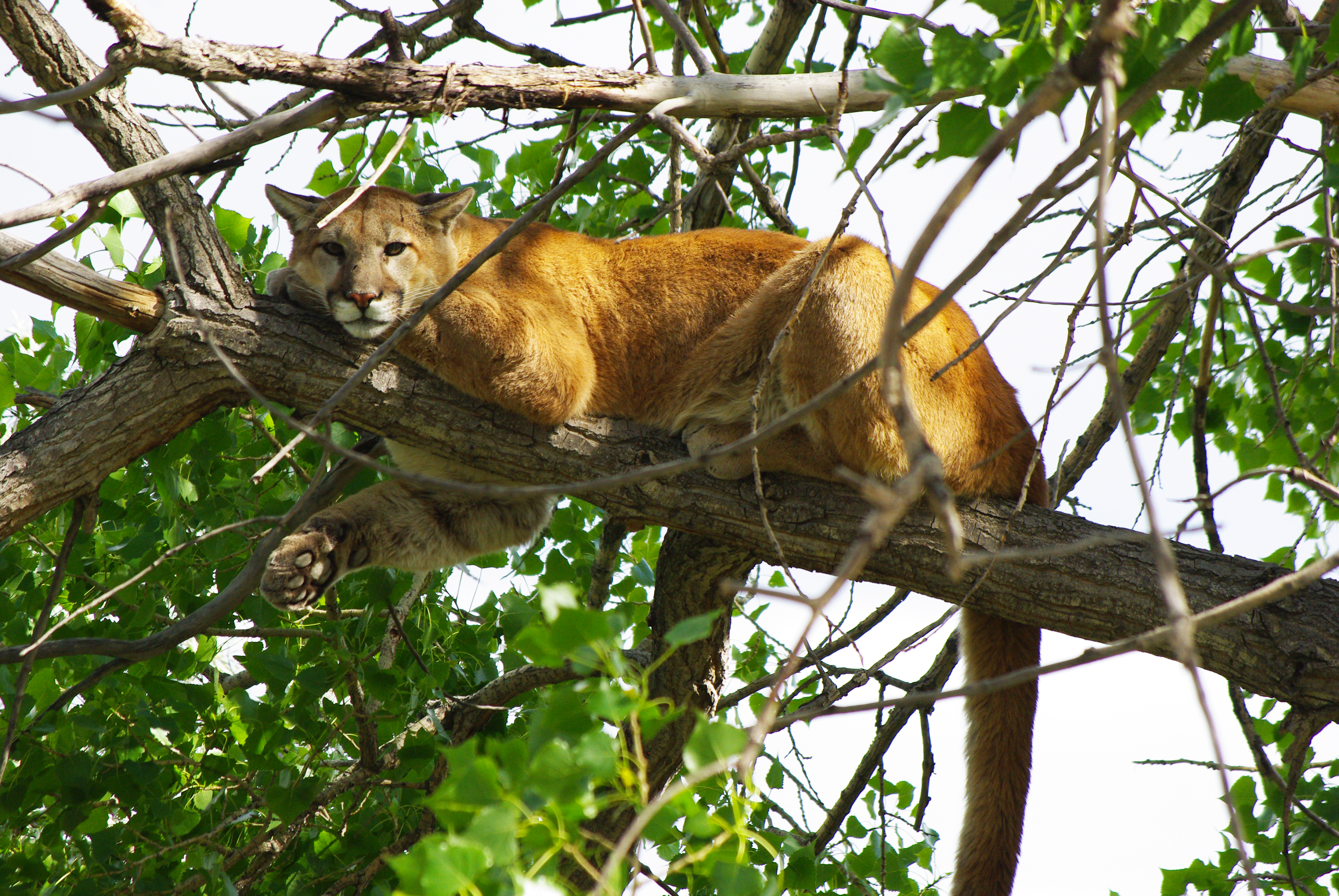
The park is a wildlife corridor used by cougars.

== Ecology ==
Wildwood Regional Park is recognized for its varied terrain, wildlife and two waterfalls. The terrain consists of large areas of volcanic rock outcroppings, the year-round Arroyo Conejo creek and its two waterfalls, oak woodlands of coast live oak and valley oak trees, creek-beds lined with California sycamore trees and cattails, several canyons, steep hills, and relatively flat grasslands.

The climate is Mediterranean, but oftentimes cooler than other areas in the Conejo Valley due to cool coastal breeze easily winding its way up through canyons and lower elevations.

The park's flora is extensive and more than 250 plant species have been recorded within the park. Habitats include: southern oak woodlands, riparian woodland, chaparral and coastal sage scrub, California grassland, and freshwater marsh.

=== Wildlife ===
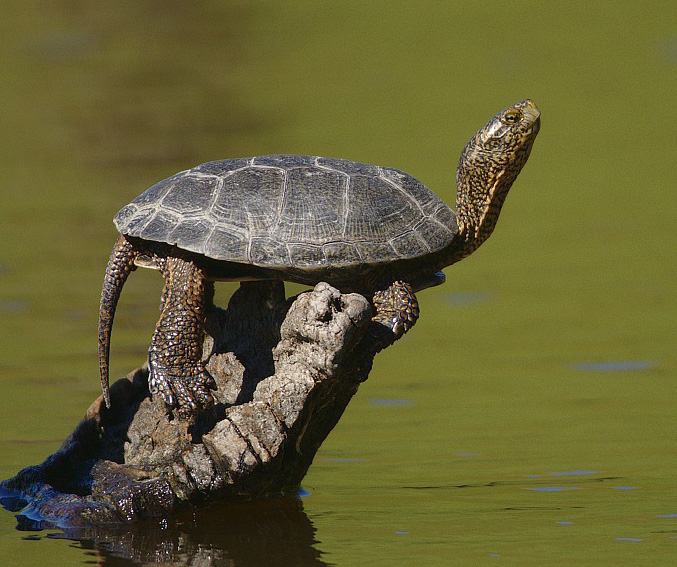
The western pond turtle, a native species in Arroyo Conejo creek.

The park is home to a wide variety of wildlife and is a wildlife corridor connecting the Santa Monica Mountains to the Santa Susana Mountains and other western Transverse Ranges. Its fauna includes 60 species of birds, 37 species of mammals, and 22 species of amphibians and reptiles.

It is home to various mammals, such as the plentiful mule deer, coyote, and bobcat; and occasionally for cougars and ring-tailed cats. Smaller mammal species include the grey fox, striped skunk and spotted skunk, California raccoon, Virginia opossum, Audubon's cottontail, long-tailed weasel, Botta's pocket gopher, California vole, western brush rabbit, and western gray squirrel.

The most common amphibians here are found along the Arroyo Conejo creekbed, and include the ensatina, slender salamander, western toad, American bullfrog, California toad, Pacific tree frog, and the California red-legged frog.

There are a variety of reptiles − including side-blotched lizards, southern alligator lizards and western fence lizards; the native western pond turtle and introduced/invasive crawdads; and numerous species of snakes, including southern Pacific rattlesnakes, San Diego gopher snakes, striped racers, California kingsnakes, common kingsnakes, ringneck snakes, and western aquatic garter snakes.

There are a variety of songbirds, wood-peckers, and raptors such as red-tail hawks, Cooper's hawks, owls, ravens, and falcons.

==== Mammals ====
Wildwood Regional Park is home to 37 species of mammals, including:

- Gray fox
- Cougar
- Bobcat
- Red fox
- Ring-tailed cat
- Mule deer
- Valley coyote
- Virginia opossum
- California raccoon
- American badger
- Long-tailed weasel
- Striped skunk
- Spotted skunk
- Black-tailed jackrabbit
- Desert cottontail
- Brush rabbit
- Western gray squirrel
- Fox squirrel
- California ground squirrel
- Merriam's chipmunk
- Botta's pocket gopher
- Desert shrew
- Ornate shrew
- Broad-footed mole
- California vole

==== Reptiles and amphibians ====
- Southern Pacific rattlesnake
- Pacific gopher snake
- California kingsnake
- Ringneck snake
- Two-striped garter snake
- Red coachwhip
- California whipsnake
- California black-headed snake
- Western yellow-bellied racer
- San Diego mountain kingsnake
- Southwestern threadsnake
- Coast patch-nosed snake
- San Diego nightsnake
- California lyre snake
- California glossy snake
- Pacific pond turtle
- Red-eared slider
- American bullfrog
- Pacific treefrog
- California treefrog
- California toad
- Western spadefoot toad
- California red-legged frog
- Black-bellied slender salamander
- California newt
- Monterey salamander
- Arboreal salamander
- Southern alligator lizard
- Great Basin fence lizard
- Western skink
- Western side-blotched lizard
- Coastal whiptail
- Blainville's horned lizard
- California legless lizard

== Filmography ==
The park sits in the Thirty Mile Zone, an area sufficiently close to Hollywood that studios do not have to pay extra for on-location shooting. A nearby road, Flaming Star Avenue, is named after the film Flaming Star (1960) starring Elvis Presley, which was filmed in the area. The park is still occasionally used for filming. Some of the many films shot here include:

- Spartacus
- Welcome to Hard Times
- Wuthering Heights
- Dodge City
- The Rifleman (1958-63)
- Davy Crockett, King of the Wild Frontier
- The Grapes of Wrath
- Riders of the Whistling Pines
- The Ballad of Josie
- Bonanza
- Wagon Train
- Gunsmoke (1955-1975)
- Duel in the Sun
- The Big Valley (1965-69)
- Clearing the Range
- Flaming Frontier
- The Horse Soldiers
- Flaming Star
- Lassie Come Home
- To the Shores of Iwo Jima
- The Guns of Will Sonnett (1967-69)
- The Gay Ranchero
- Gunsight Ridge
- The Ride Back
- Westward Ho the Wagons!
- The Left Handed Gun
- Wild Heritage
- Escort West
- The Man Who Shot Liberty Valance
- Advance to the Rear
- Stage to Thunder Rock
- Shenandoah
- The Plainsman
- How the West Was Won
- Dark Victory
- The Outsider
- Firecreek
- Ride a Crooked Trail
- Rawhide
- Cheyenne Autumn
- The Young Country
- The Concentratin' Kid
- Tales of Wells Fargo
- Sands of Iwo Jima
- He Rides Tall
- Cattle Town
- Bad Boy (1949)
- Taggart (1964)
- The Legend of Tom Dooley
- Tall Man Riding
- Rebel in Town
- The Doolins of Oklahoma
- Cast a Long Shadow
- Apache Rifles
- The First Texan
- The Lawless Breed
- Death of a Gunfighter
- Red Sundown
- Man Without a Star
- Cimarron (1960)
- Journey to Shiloh
- The Duel at Silver Creek
- The Bull of the West
- Destry (1954)
- The Good Guys and the Bad Guys
- The Command (1954)
- Man of the West

== See also ==
- La Branca (Arroyo Conejo Nature Preserve)
- Mount Clef Ridge
- Hill Canyon
- Conejo Canyons Open Space
- Natural history of the California chaparral and woodlands
- Parks in Ventura County, California
- Simi Hills topics
