= Mugu Lagoon =

Salt marsh in Ventura County, California

Coordinates: 34.102°N 119.094°W

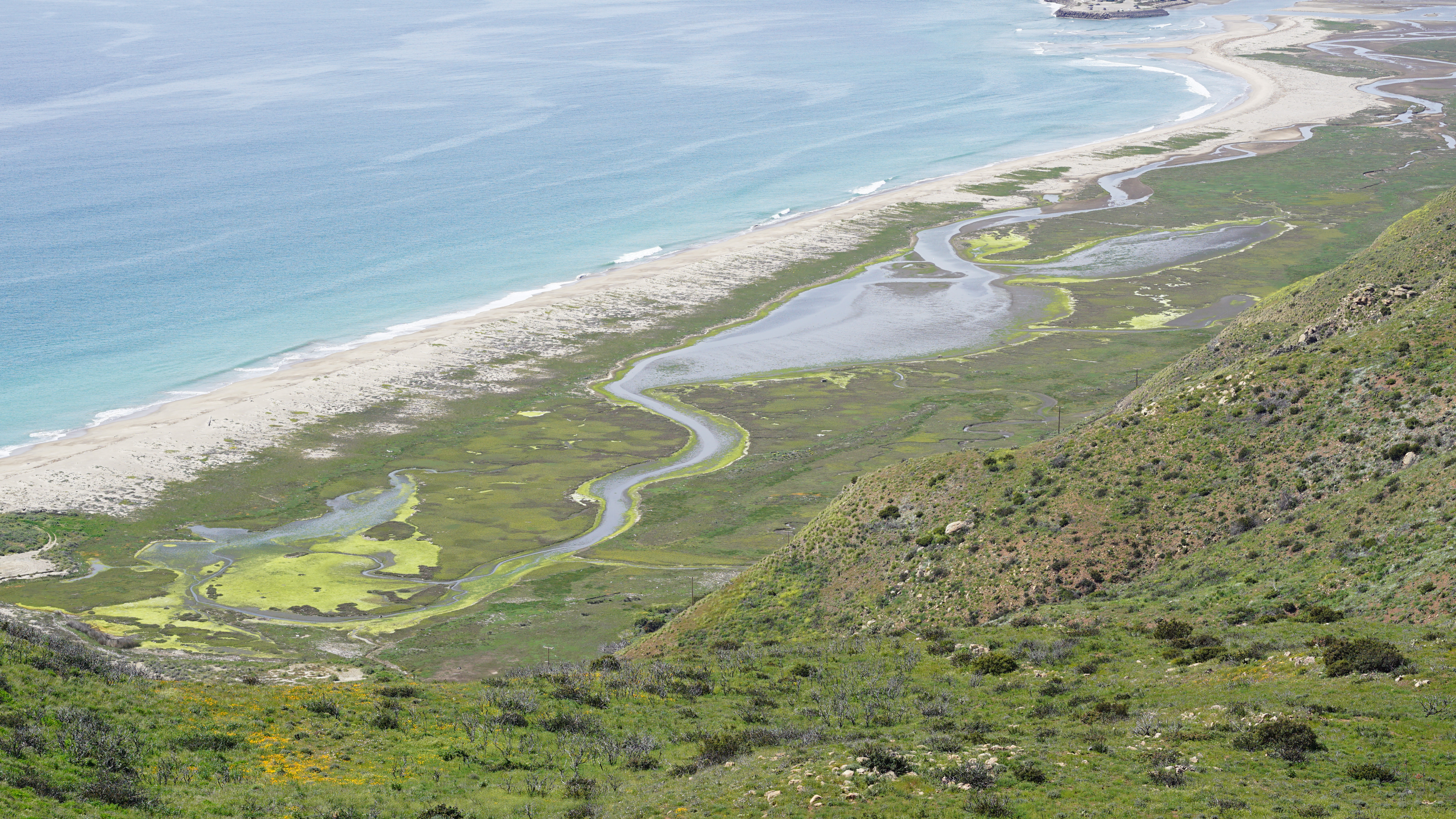
Mugu Lagoon from the Mugu Peak Trail

Mugu Lagoon (/muːˈɡuː/; Chumash: Muwu, meaning "Beach") is a salt marsh located within the Naval Base Ventura County at the foot of the Santa Monica Mountains in Ventura County, California. The lagoon extends for 4.3 miles parallel to a narrow barrier beach. The first European to come ashore here was Juan Rodríguez Cabrillo on October 10, 1542. Cabrillo was the first European to visit present-day California, and he named the lagoon Mugu after Muwu, which is Chumash meaning "beach" or "seashore". When the Europeans first discovered the lagoon, it functioned as the capital village of the Chumash Indians settled around Point Mugu.

== Geography ==
The Calleguas Creek, and its tributaries such as Arroyo Conejo and Arroyo Simi, discharges into the Pacific Ocean at its estuary in Mugu Lagoon. Historically, Calleguas Creek flood flows spread across the floodplain and the deposited sediment created the rich agricultural lands of the Oxnard Plain. With year-round agriculture in the floodplain, concrete channels and dirt levees have been built to contain the flow. This has delivered increased sediment to Mugu Lagoon and flooding during extreme rain events.
