= Banning Dam =

Banning Dam Lake Eleanor Dam
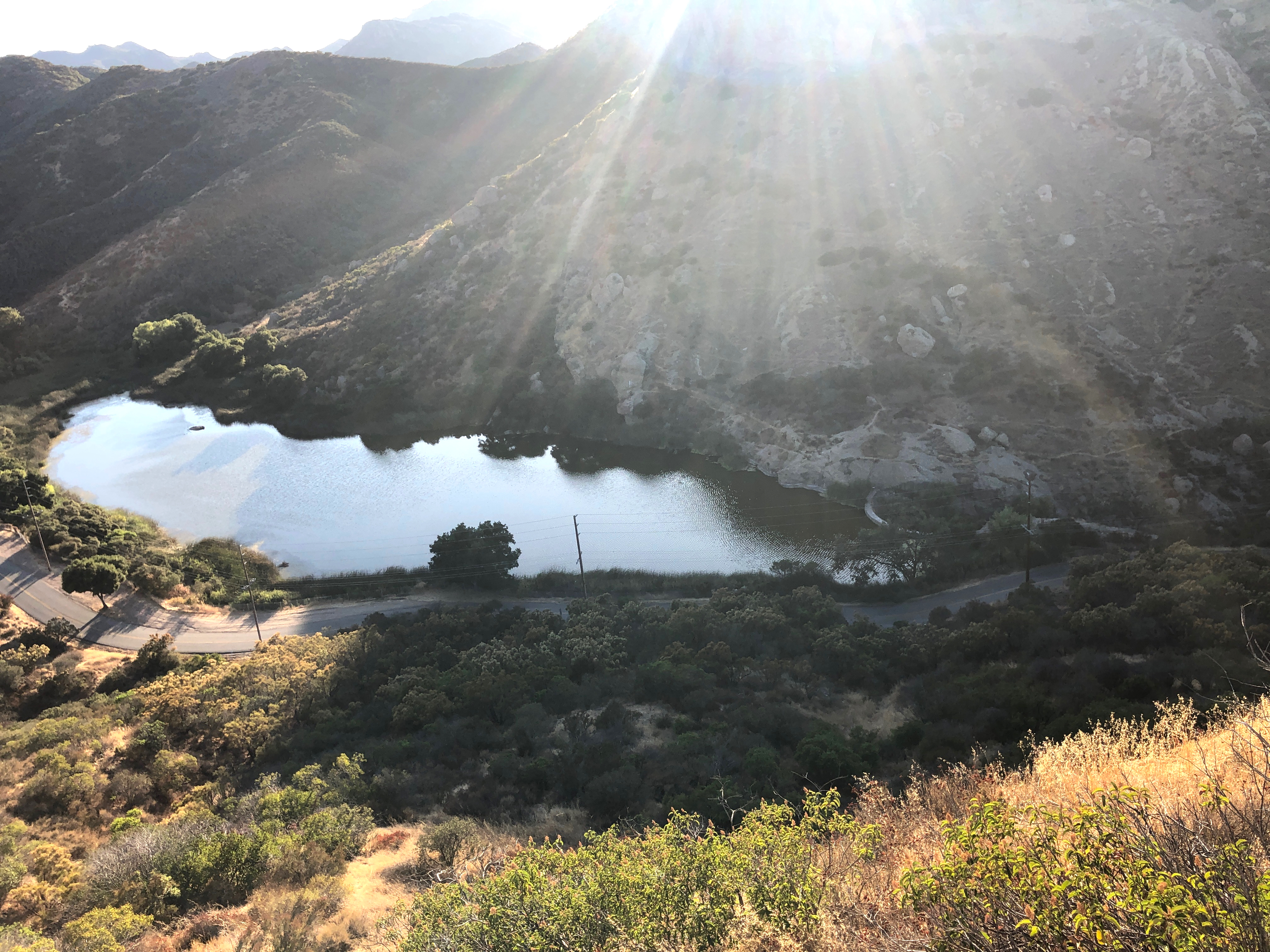
- Lake Eleanor as seen from above

- Location within California
- Country: United States
- Location: Ventura County, California
- Coordinates: 34°08′07″N 118°51′06″W
- Status: Operational
- Construction began: 1881; 145 years ago
- Opening date: 1889; 137 years ago
- Construction cost: $500 (1889)
- Owner: Conejo Open Space Conservation Agency

Dam and spillways
- Type of dam: Arch, constant-radius
- Height: 37 ft (11 m)
- Length: 140 ft (43 m)

Reservoir
- Creates: Lake Eleanor

Lake Eleanor (National ID # CA00737), also known as Banning Dam, is an 8-acre (3.2 ha) freshwater lake (gravity dam) near Westlake Village in Thousand Oaks, California. The lake lies within the 513-acre (208 ha) Lake Eleanor Open Space and was Ventura County Historic Landmark No. 120 in 1988. It is also designated City of Thousand Oaks Historical Landmark No. 9. Under ownership of Conejo Open Space Conservation Agency (COSCA), the lake sits in a gorge with sheer cliffs and drops of 40–50 ft (12–15 m). An artificial lake, it was first constructed in 1889, and may be the first concrete arched dam built in California.

Although not a major dam, Banning Dam is among the oldest still standing in the state. Nearby Sherwood Dam dates from 1904 (122 years ago). It is less than 1 mile (1.6 km) east of Lake Sherwood. The structure is located within the Lake Eleanor Open Space. At 37 feet high, and 140 feet long at its crest, the dam is owned by the local Conejo Open Space Conservation Agency.

== Etymology ==
Named for its builder, "Captain" William Banning, it impounds Eleanor Creek to form the recreational Lake Eleanor.

== History ==
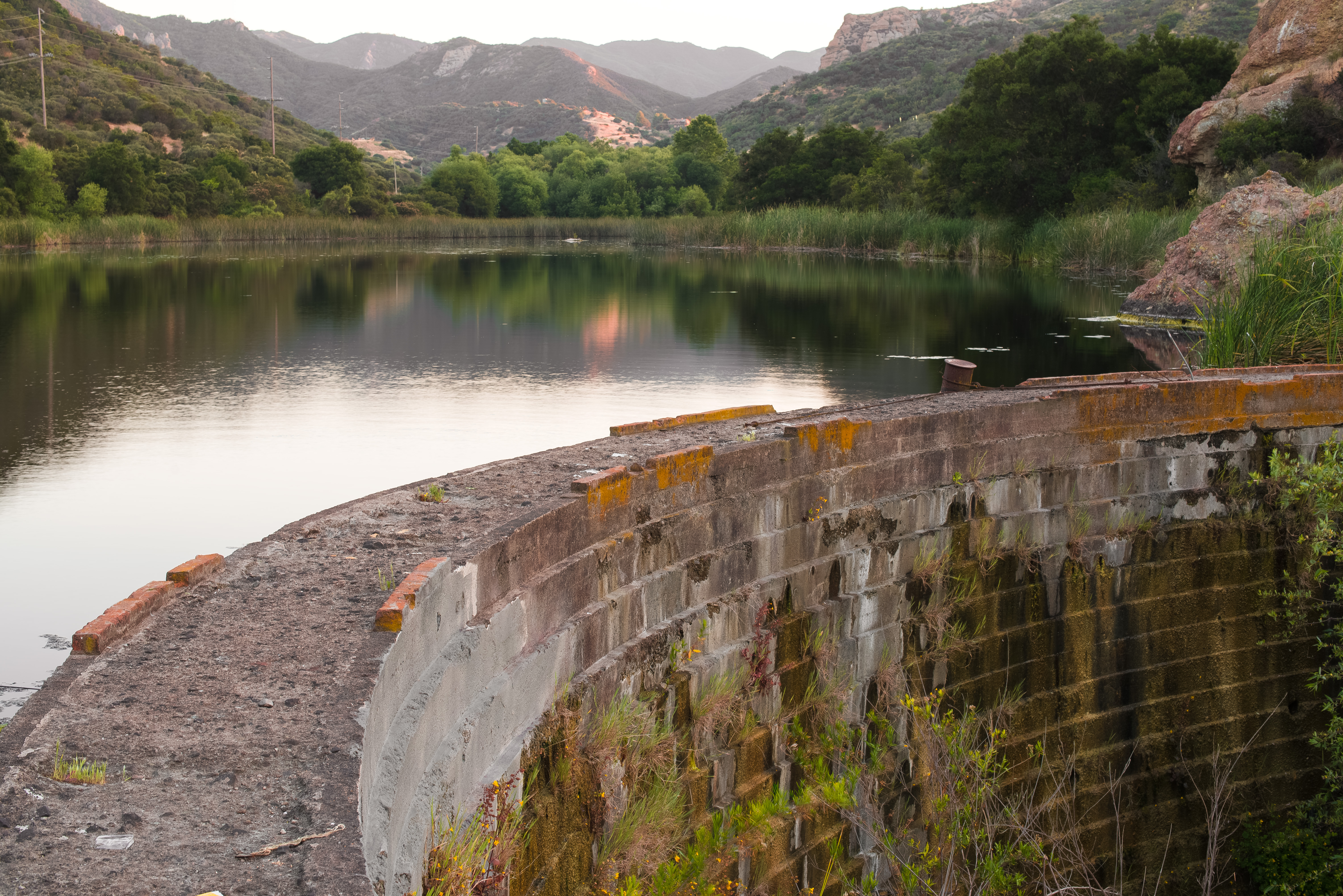

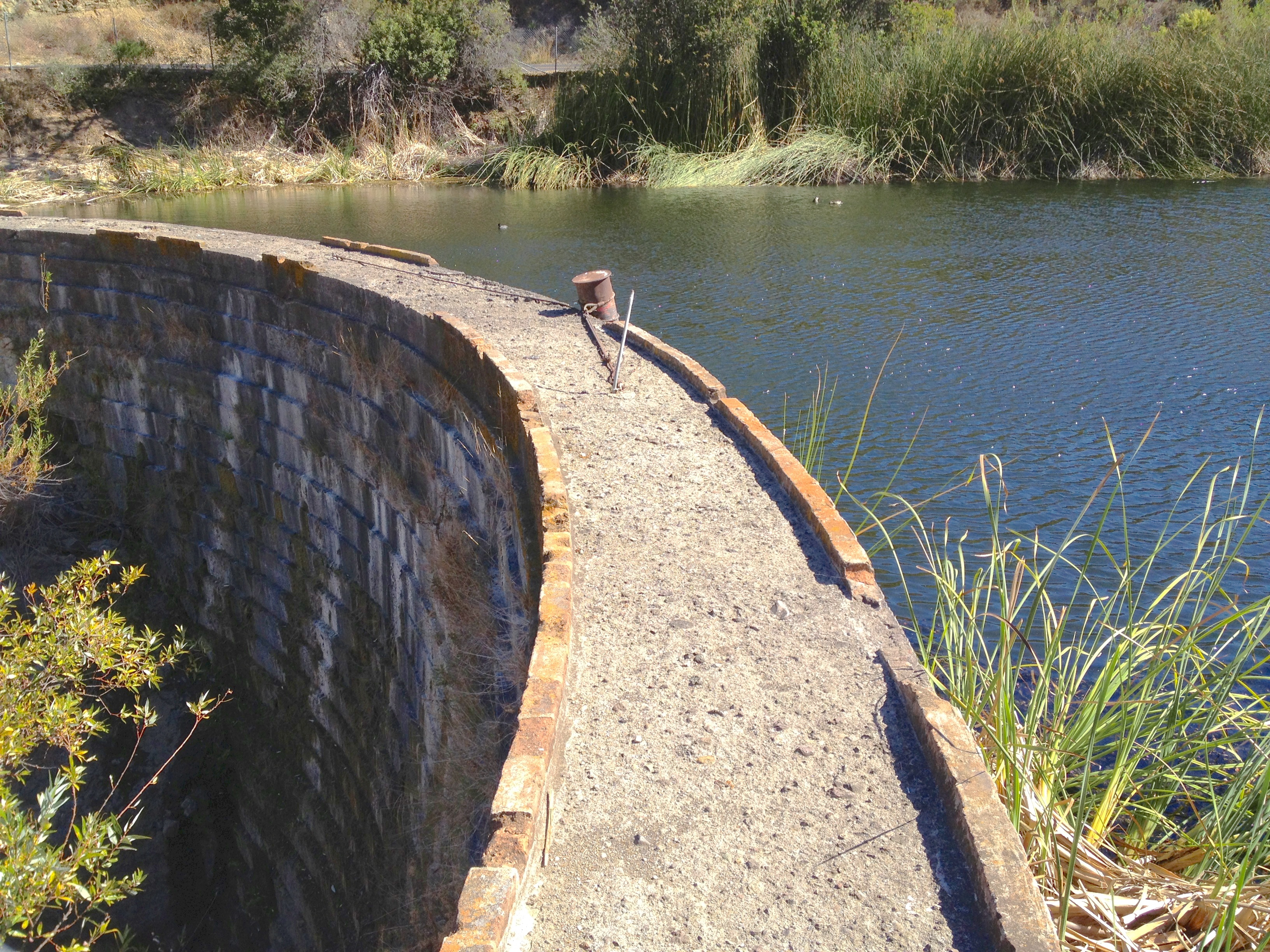

Lake Eleanor was originally constructed as a reliable water source for cattle in the 1880s. Work on the dam began in 1881 and was completed in 1889. Officials drained the reservoir in 1972 arguing it was a hazard, however, hundreds of frogs died and wildlife was consequentially moved to Triunfo Creek after the drainage.

The lake was acquired by the Conejo Open Space Conservation Agency (COSCA) in 1986, and was designated Ventura County Historic Landmark No. 120 in May 1988. It was later designated City of Thousand Oaks Historical Landmark No. 9.

== Ecology ==
Lake Eleanor Open Space makes up diverse wildlife habitats and landscapes such as rugged hills, rocky outcrops, marsh habitat, coastal sage scrub, and native oak woodland. The area supports several endangered and rare species of plants and nesting sites for hawks and other avifauna. Due to its sensitive resources and also the rugged terrain, there is only one trail developed in the open space, which follows the ridge east of Westlake Boulevard, accessed from Denver Springs Drive in Westlake Village, California. Another trailhead is located at Highgate Road in Thousand Oaks, California.

The 8-acre lake and its surrounding 529 acres of open space are fenced off from the public, in order to create habitat for wildlife species such as the Great Blue Heron.

== Recreation ==
Due to sensitive resources and rough terrain, trails have not been developed in the area. One trail has however been developed following the ridgeline east of Westlake Boulevard. This trail provides views of two additional bodies of water: Westlake Lake and Las Virgenes Reservoir. The trail, which starts and begins in neighborhoods, can be reached from its trailheads at Highgate Road and Denver Springs Drive. Besides mountain and lake views, the ridgeline trail also offers views of the Conejo Valley and the Santa Monica Mountains. A variety of highpoints can be found along the trail, which has a total elevation gain of 500 ft.

== See also ==
- Sherwood Dam
- Rindge Dam
- List of dams and reservoirs in California
- List of lakes in California
- Westlake Village, California
