= Hero World Challenge =

Golf tournament

Coordinates: 25.0150°N 77.5056°W

Tournament information
- Location: Albany, New Providence, The Bahamas
- Established: 2000
- Course: Albany Golf Course
- Par: 72
- Length: 7,414 yards (6,779 m)
- Tour: PGA Tour (unofficial event)
- Format: Stroke play
- Prize fund: US$5,000,000
- Month played: December
- Website: heroworldchallenge.com

Tournament record score
- Aggregate: 262 Jordan Spieth (2014)
- To par: −26 as above

Current champion
- (Japan) Hideki Matsuyama

Final champion
- Location in The Bahamas

The Hero World Challenge is a golf tournament hosted by Tiger Woods, which takes place each December. It features a small number (currently 20) of top-ranked golf pros. The tournament is a benefit for the Tiger Woods Foundation. The event is part of the PGA Tour schedule, but does not offer FedEx Cup points or official money as it is an unofficial event.

== Format ==
Initially, the tournament had a 16-man field composed of the defending champion, the top 11 available players from the Official World Golf Ranking, and four sponsors exemptions chosen by the Tiger Woods Foundation. In 2008, the field was increased to 18 players, consisting of the most recent winners of the four major PGA tournaments, the top 11 available players from the Official World Golf Ranking, the defending champion, and two special exemption players selected by the foundation.

In 2021, the field was increased to 20 adding an automatic invitation to the winner of The Players Championship going forward while the rest of the field selection remained the same. However, the 2021 field included automatic invitations to four major winners of both 2020 and 2021 since the 2020 event was not held.

Prize money won by the players is not included in money rankings on any of the world's professional golf tours, but the tournament is recognized as an unofficial money event by the PGA Tour. Since 2009, the event offers Official World Golf Ranking points.

In 2007 the total prize fund was $5.75 million, similar to many official PGA Tour events, which usually have fields of about 150 players. In 2014, the first prize was $1 million, and the total purse was $3.5 million. Woods usually donates his prize money to his foundation.

Hero World Challenge tournament is preceded by a pro-am competition, in which professional golfers play with amateurs. Hero World Challenge pro-am is usually organized two days before the first round of professional play. "Am-Am outing" takes place on the first day, "Official Pro-Am" on the second day. The access to the pro-am competition is limited only to the tournament partners. The pro-am tournament is closed to public.

The amateur participants of the 2016 pro-am included, for instance, Derek Jeter and Tino Martinez.

== History ==
In 2000, the tournament was staged twice, with Tom Lehman winning the first event in January. The tournament then moved to December of that year, with Davis Love III winning that event. It has been played in December ever since. The January 2000 event was played at Grayhawk Golf Club in Scottsdale, Arizona. From December 2000 to 2013, the event took place at Sherwood Country Club, a course designed by Jack Nicklaus, in Thousand Oaks, California.

In 2008, Woods did not compete due to knee surgery following his 2008 U.S. Open victory, even though he was the two-time defending champion. He did not play in 2009 due to time spent away from golf related to personal matters. Woods returned to the event in 2010.

In 2011, Woods won the tournament with a score of −10, defeating Zach Johnson by one shot. Woods made birdie on the final two holes to win; it was his first win in over two years, since the 2009 Australian Masters.

The tournament was the Williams World Challenge for its first three playings/two years. Beginning in 2002 was rechristened the Target World Challenge. It was called the Chevron World Challenge from 2008 through 2011. In 2012, new sponsor Northwestern Mutual was the presenting sponsor instead of a title sponsor; they became the title sponsor in 2013. In 2014, Hero MotoCorp became the title sponsor. In 2015, the event moved to the Albany development in the Bahamas.

== Television ==
The first World Challenge was televised by the USA Network and NBC Sports. It was then covered by USA and ABC Sports from 2000 to 2006. It has been televised by Golf Channel and a returning NBC since 2007.

== Winners ==
Year	Winner	Score	To par	Margin of victory	Runner-up	Winner's share ($)	Venue
Hero World Challenge
2025	(Japan) Hideki Matsuyama (2)	266	−22	Playoff	(Sweden) Alex Norén	1,000,000	Albany
2024	(United States) Scottie Scheffler (2)	263	−25	6 strokes	(South Korea) Tom Kim	1,000,000	Albany
2023	(United States) Scottie Scheffler	268	−20	3 strokes	(Austria) Sepp Straka	1,000,000	Albany
2022	(Norway) Viktor Hovland (2)	272	−16	2 strokes	(United States) Scottie Scheffler	1,000,000	Albany
2021	(Norway) Viktor Hovland	270	−18	1 stroke	(United States) Scottie Scheffler	1,000,000	Albany
2020	Cancelled due to the COVID-19 pandemic						
2019	(Sweden) Henrik Stenson	270	−18	1 stroke	(Spain) Jon Rahm	1,000,000	Albany
2018	(Spain) Jon Rahm	268	−20	4 strokes	(United States) Tony Finau	1,000,000	Albany
2017	(United States) Rickie Fowler	270	−18	4 strokes	(United States) Charley Hoffman	1,000,000	Albany
2016	(Japan) Hideki Matsuyama	270	−18	2 strokes	(Sweden) Henrik Stenson	1,000,000	Albany
2015	(United States) Bubba Watson	263	−25	3 strokes	(United States) Patrick Reed	1,000,000	Albany
2014	(United States) Jordan Spieth	262	−26	10 strokes	(Sweden) Henrik Stenson	1,000,000	Isleworth
Northwestern Mutual World Challenge
2013	(United States) Zach Johnson	275	−13	Playoff	(United States) Tiger Woods	1,000,000	Sherwood
World Challenge
2012	(Northern Ireland) Graeme McDowell (2)	271	−17	3 strokes	(United States) Keegan Bradley	1,000,000	Sherwood
Chevron World Challenge
2011	(United States) Tiger Woods (5)	278	−10	1 stroke	(United States) Zach Johnson	1,200,000	Sherwood
2010	(Northern Ireland) Graeme McDowell	272	−16	Playoff	(United States) Tiger Woods	1,200,000	Sherwood
2009	(United States) Jim Furyk	275	−13	1 stroke	(Northern Ireland) Graeme McDowell	1,350,000	Sherwood
2008	(Fiji) Vijay Singh	277	−11	1 stroke	(United States) Steve Stricker	1,350,000	Sherwood
Target World Challenge
2007	(United States) Tiger Woods (4)	266	−22	7 strokes	(United States) Zach Johnson	1,350,000	Sherwood
2006	(United States) Tiger Woods (3)	272	−16	4 strokes	(Australia) Geoff Ogilvy	1,350,000	Sherwood
2005	(England) Luke Donald	272	−16	2 strokes	(Northern Ireland) Darren Clarke	1,300,000	Sherwood
2004	(United States) Tiger Woods (2)	268	−16	2 strokes	(Republic of Ireland) Pádraig Harrington	1,250,000	Sherwood
2003	(United States) Davis Love III (2)	277	−11	2 strokes	(United States) Tiger Woods	1,200,000	Sherwood
2002	(Republic of Ireland) Pádraig Harrington	268	−20	2 strokes	(United States) Tiger Woods	1,000,000	Sherwood
Williams World Challenge
2001	(United States) Tiger Woods	273	−15	3 strokes	(Fiji) Vijay Singh	1,000,000	Sherwood
2000 (Dec)	(United States) Davis Love III	266	−22	2 strokes	(United States) Tiger Woods	1,000,000	Sherwood
2000 (Jan)	(United States) Tom Lehman	267	−13	3 strokes	(United States) David Duval	1,000,000	Grayhawk
