= Westlake Village, California =

City in the United States

- City
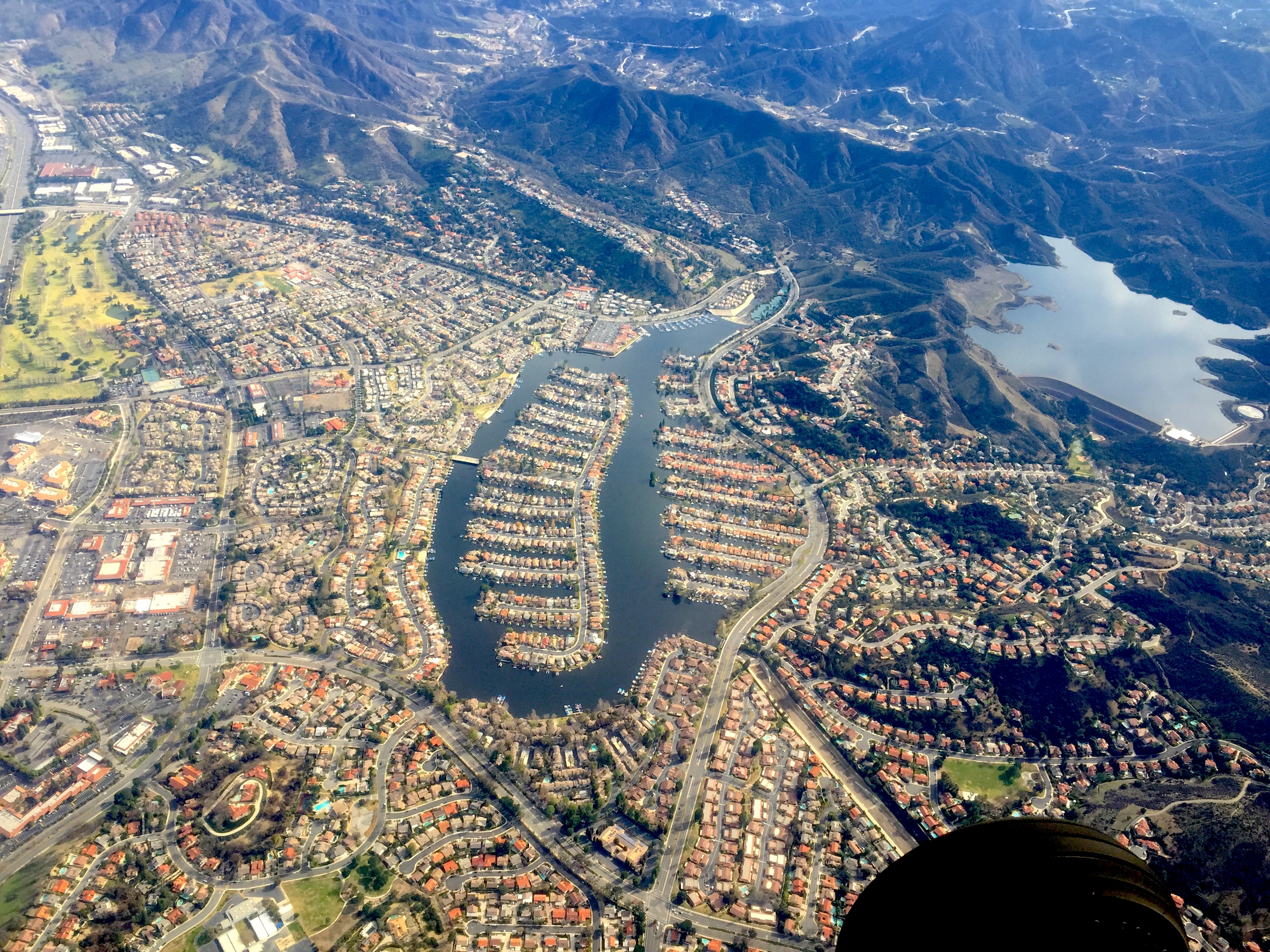
- Aerial view of the Westlake subdivision
- Interactive map of Westlake Village, California
- Location in the United States
- Coordinates: 34°8′31″N 118°49′10″W
- Country: United States
- State: California
- County: Los Angeles
- Region: Conejo Valley
- Incorporated (city): December 11, 1981

Government
  - Type: Council-Manager
  - Mayor: Kelly Honig
  - Mayor Pro Tem: Susan McSweeney
  - City Council: Brad Halpern; Ray Pearl; Ned E Davis
  - City Manager: Rob de Geus
  - Deputy City Manager: Philippe Eskandar

Area
  - Total: 5.51 sq mi (14.26 km^{2})
  - Land: 5.19 sq mi (13.43 km^{2})
  - Water: 0.32 sq mi (0.83 km^{2}) 5.80%
- Elevation: 879 ft (268 m)

Population (2020)
  - Total: 8,029
  - Density: 1,548/sq mi (597.8/km^{2})
- Time zone: UTC-8 (PST)
  - Summer (DST): UTC-7 (PDT)
- ZIP Code: 91359, 91361, 91362
- Area code: 747/818
- FIPS code: 06-84438
- Website: www.wlv.org

Westlake Village is a city in Los Angeles County, California, United States, on its western border with Ventura County. Upon its incorporation in 1981, Westlake Village became the 82nd municipality of Los Angeles County. The population of the city was 8,029 at the 2020 census.

The city is named after the master-planned community surrounding Westlake Lake. With the lake at the center, the community straddles the line between Los Angeles and Ventura counties. Roughly two-thirds of the community is in the Ventura County city of Thousand Oaks.

== History ==
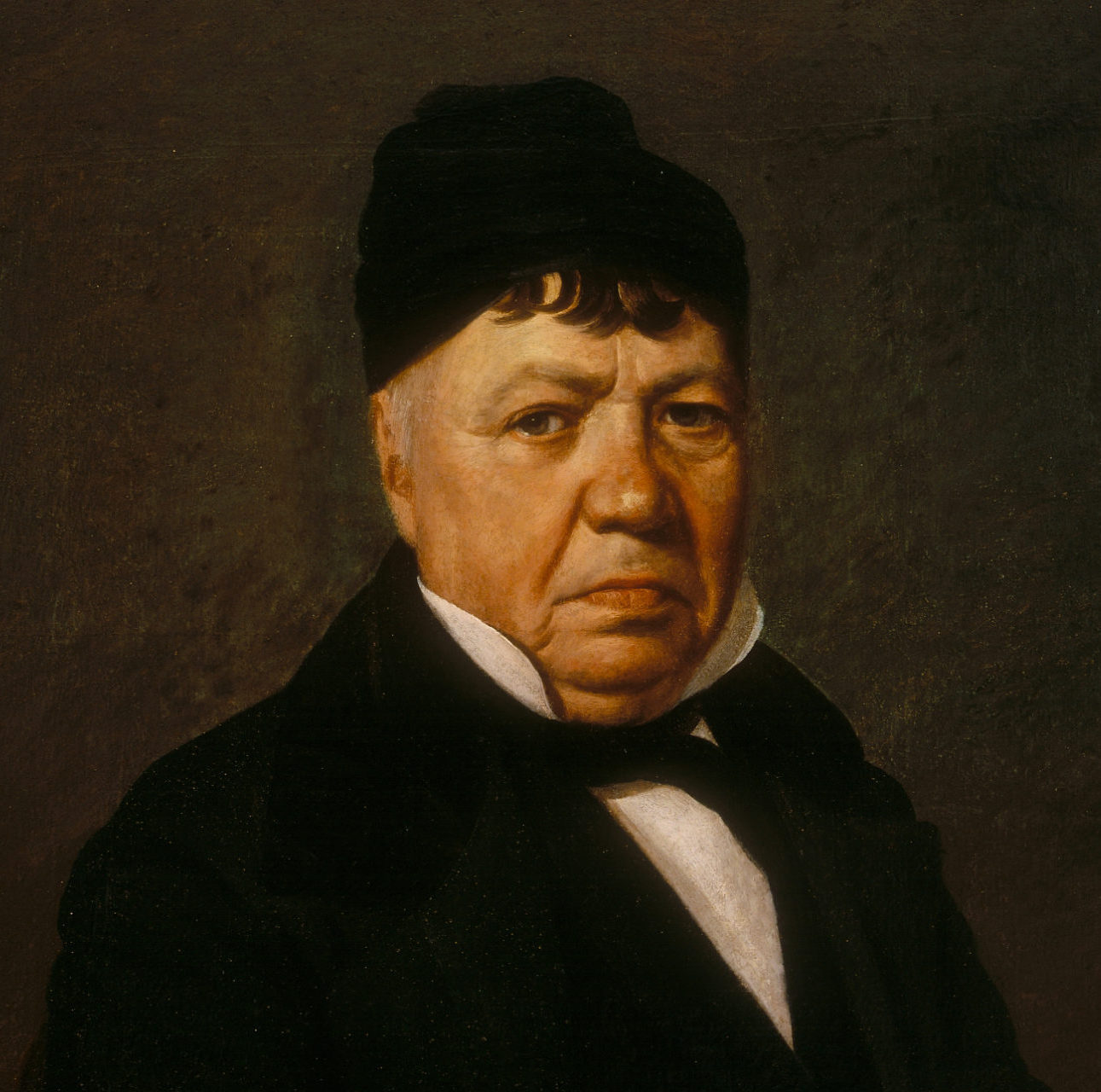
Westlake Village was part of Rancho El Conejo, owned by Don José de la Guerra y Noriega, founder of the prominent Guerra family of California.

About 3,000 years ago, the Chumash moved into the region and lived by hunting rabbits and other game, and gathering grains and acorns. Excavations, archaeological sites, and polychrome rock paintings in the area provide a glimpse into the social and economic complexity of the ancient Chumash world.

A Chumash village was settled here in 500 BCE, known as Hipuc. The Chumash Indians gathered and prepared acorns and other seeds. These were collected in the fall. The Chumash also hunted wild animals, fish and gathered plants. Their diet consisted of acorns, gophers, cottontail rabbits, skunks, jack rabbits, rats, mice, and seeds. They made their clothing from the skins of animals such as rabbits, deer, and sea otters. Women wore long skirts woven from grass or soft bark, while men wore pieces of deerskin tied around their waists. Both men and women painted designs on their bodies and wore shell beads.

On a return trip from Northern California in January 1770, a group of men led by Gaspar de Portolá are believed to be the first Europeans to encounter the Chumash Indians in the Conejo Valley. Father Juan Crespí, chaplain and diarist of the expedition, wrote about El Triumfo, a Chumash village. He wrote that there was plenty of water and firewood in the village, and that the land was covered with pastures. He wrote: "We are on a plain of considerable extent and much beauty, forested on all parts by live oaks and oak trees, with much pasturage and water." Crespí named the place El triunfo del Dulcísimo Nombre de Jesús (in English: The Triumph of the Sweetest Name of Jesus) to a camping place by a creek.

Other villages were found throughout the valley, including Satwiwa and two villages near Ventu Park Road in Newbury Park. These Chumash villages are believed by archeologists to have first been settled over 2,000 years ago. Another village was located by Lake Sherwood.

In 1795, the area became part of one of the first Spanish land grants, Rancho Simi, given to the Pico family of California. When Mexico won independence from Spain in 1821, Alta California became Mexican territory, and the Rancho Simi grant was confirmed in 1842.

In 1881, the Russell brothers purchased a large portion of the land for cattle ranching. According to Patricia Allen, historian and family descendant, Andrew Russell beat the competition in buying the land by racing across 6,000 acres (24 km^{2}) on a fifteen-minute trip in a buckboard and sealed the deal with a $20 gold piece. The price per acre was $2.50. The area continued to be known as the Russell Ranch although it was sold in 1925 to William Randolph Hearst and again in 1943 to Fred Albertson. The Russell family leased back part of the land to continue its successful cattle ranch operation while the Albertson Company used the vast area as a movie ranch. Many movies and television shows were filmed in the Conejo Valley, including Robin Hood, King Rat, Laredo, and various episodes of Tarzan, Buck Rogers, Gunsmoke and Bonanza. The 1940 film Danger Ahead was filmed on Westlake Boulevard.

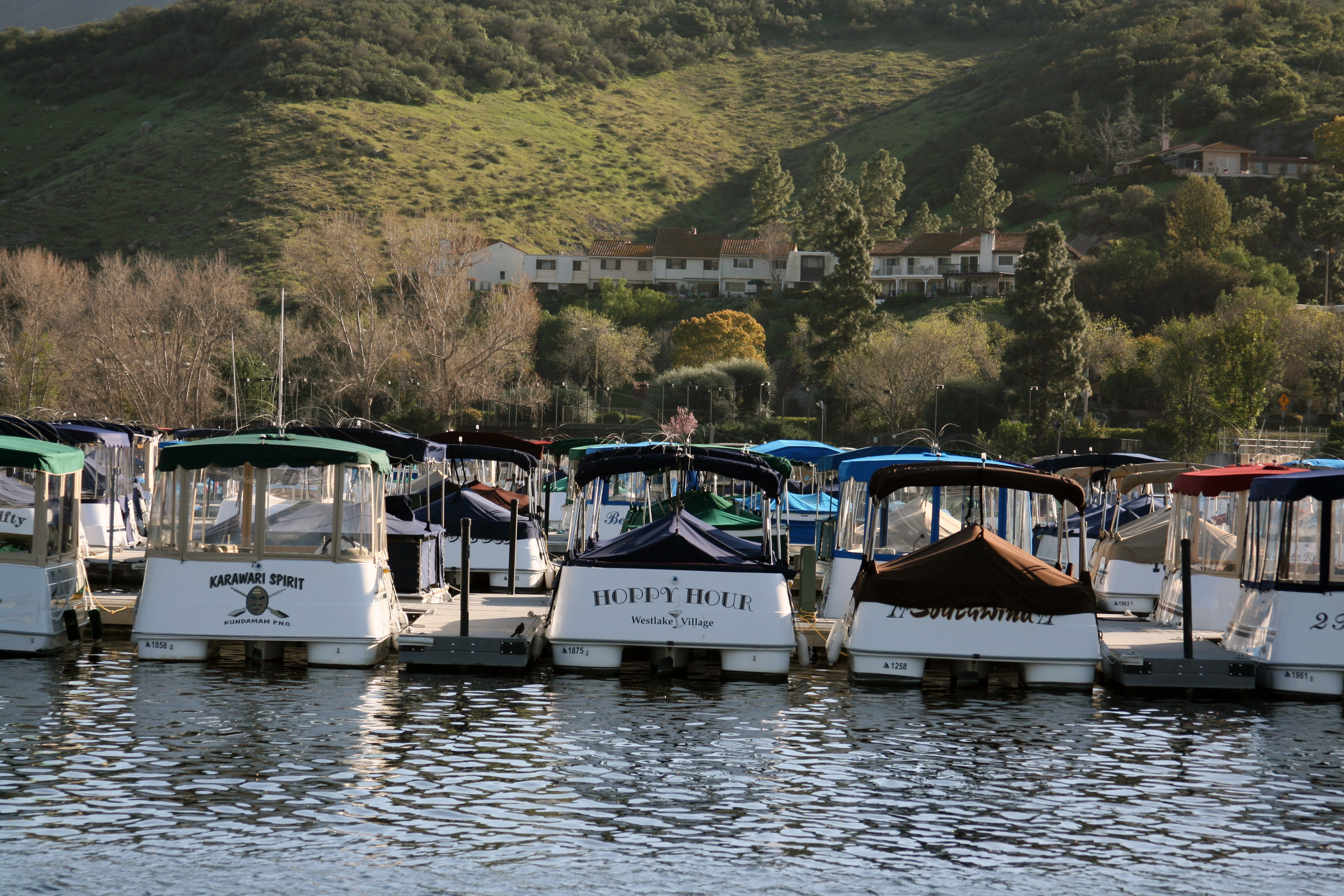
Westlake Lake

In 1963, Daniel K. Ludwig's American-Hawaiian Steamship Company bought the 12,000 acre (49 km^{2}) ranch for $32 million and, in partnership with Prudential Insurance Company, commissioned the preparation of a master plan by architectural and planning firm A. C. Martin and Associates. This new "city in the country" planned to have a firm economic base including commercial areas, residential neighborhoods, and ample green space with the lake as a focal point. Prominent architects, engineers, and land planners participated in designing the new community, a distinctive example of planned 1960s-style suburbanism.

The original tract was divided by the Los Angeles/Ventura county line. In 1968 and 1972, two portions of the Westlake development consisting of 8,544 acres (35 km^{2}) on the Ventura County side were annexed into the city of Thousand Oaks. In 1981, the Los Angeles County portion (3,456 acres (13.99 km^{2}) or roughly 1/3) of the Westlake master-planned community was incorporated as the City of Westlake Village. California state law prevents a city from existing in two separate counties.

In November of 2018 the community was affected by the Woolsey Fire.

== Geography ==
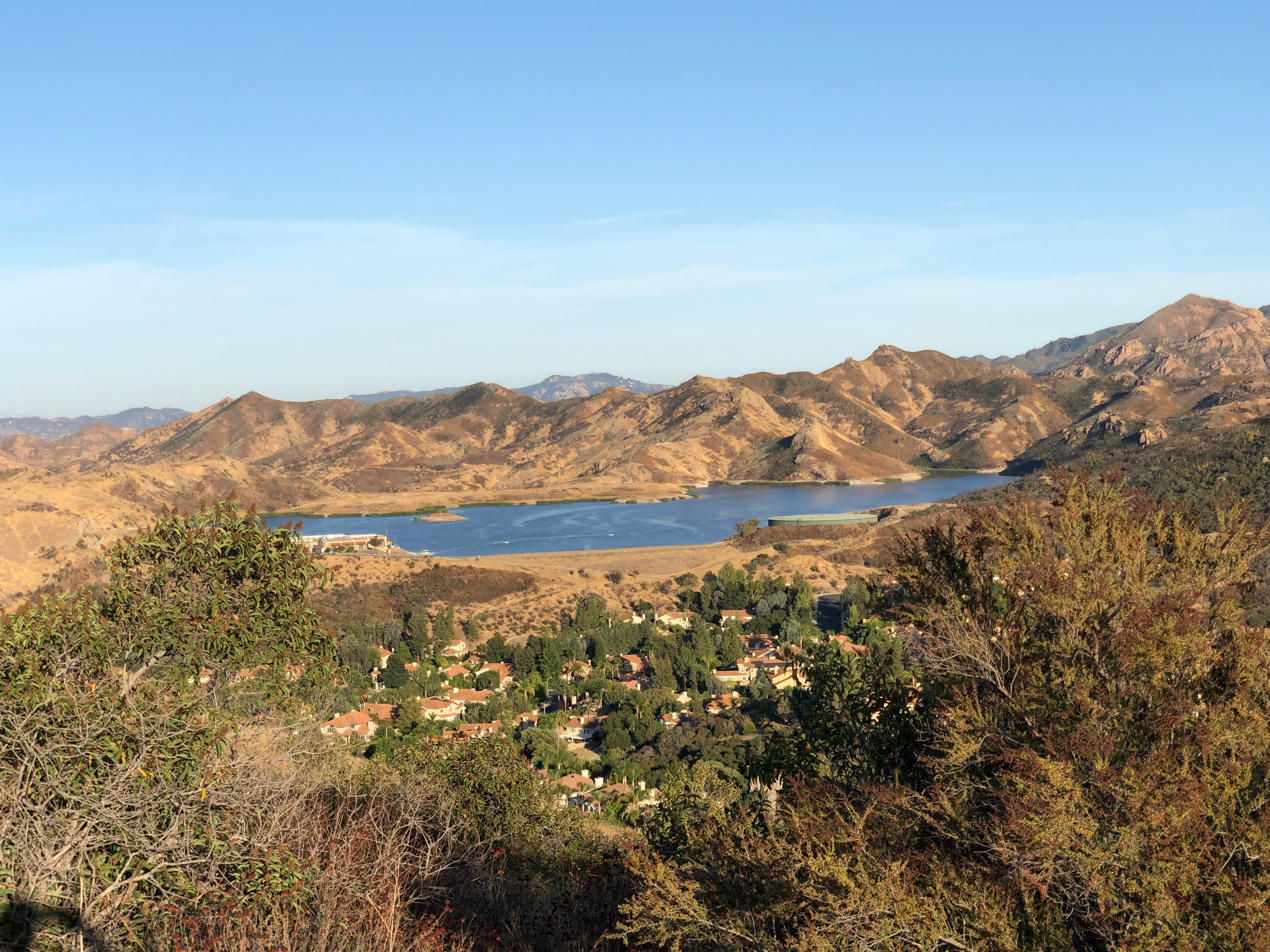
Las Virgenes Reservoir

In addition to being a bedroom community for Los Angeles via the Ventura (101) Freeway, Westlake Village is also home to many large commercial offices. The western regional office (Region 5) of Anheuser-Busch Inc. is also located in the community. Pacific Coast Highway and the Ronald Reagan (CA 118) Freeway also run nearby. It is a short drive to the mall in Thousand Oaks.

Much of Westlake Village is surrounded by open space, including hiking and horse trails, as well as the vast Santa Monica Mountains National Recreation Area. The town is in the northwestern Santa Monica Mountains area, and is 9 miles (14 km) inland from the Pacific Ocean. The area is within a wildlife corridor linking the Santa Monica Mountains with other undeveloped habitat. Mountain lions have been seen roaming the neighborhoods. The lake lies within the watershed of Malibu Creek. Water from the lake must be released into the creek in compliance with an agreement between the California State Water Resources Control Board and the Westlake Lake Management Association, a private entity that oversees the operation of the lake.

The area has several golf courses: the Westlake Golf Course, Sherwood Country Club, and North Ranch Country Club.

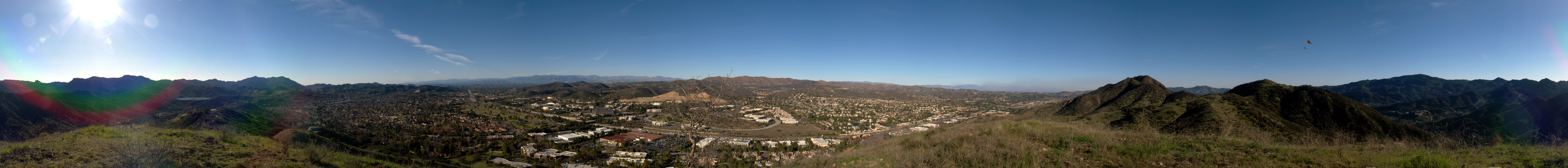
Panorama of Westlake Village

Over one half of the original "Westlake" development lies west across the county line, wholly within the city limits of Thousand Oaks. This boundary, which divides the incorporated City of Westlake Village and the Thousand Oaks portion of Westlake Village, crosses over the Westlake Golf Course, halfway between Lakeview Canyon and Lindero Canyon roads, and half of the lake itself. Lake Sherwood is nearby.

The City of Westlake Village is located approximately 40 miles (64 km) west of downtown Los Angeles in the Conejo Valley. Other communities in the surrounding area include Thousand Oaks, Oak Park, Agoura Hills, Calabasas, Newbury Park, and Malibu.

=== Climate ===
Coastal breezes sweep through canyons to allow Westlake to sometimes be up to 10 degrees cooler and considerably less hazy than the nearby San Fernando Valley during the summer months. However, it generally remains 10 degrees hotter than the coastal plains below the Conejo Grade, in the communities of Santa Rosa Valley, Camarillo, and Ventura among others.

== Demographics ==
Historical population
Census	Pop.	Note	%±
1990	7,455		—
2000	8,368		12.2%
2010	8,270		−1.2%
2020	8,029		−2.9%
U.S. Decennial Census; 1860–1870 1880-1890; 1900 1910 1920; 1930 1940 1950; 1960 1970 1980; 1990 2000 2010; 2020

Westlake Village first appeared as a city in the 1990 U.S. census, part of the Calabasas census community division (CCD).

=== Racial and ethnic composition ===
Westlake Village, California – Racial and ethnic composition Note: the US Census treats Hispanic/Latino as an ethnic category. This table excludes Latinos from the racial categories and assigns them to a separate category. Hispanics/Latinos may be of any race.
Race / Ethnicity (NH = Non-Hispanic)	Pop 1990	Pop 2000	Pop 2010	Pop 2020	% 1990	% 2000	% 2010	% 2020
White alone (NH)	6,659	7,248	6,940	6,248	89.32%	86.62%	83.92%	77.82%
Black or African American alone (NH)	56	68	97	67	0.75%	0.81%	1.17%	0.83%
Native American or Alaska Native alone (NH)	9	6	9	6	0.12%	0.07%	0.11%	0.07%
Asian alone (NH)	418	498	485	619	5.61%	5.95%	5.86%	7.71%
Native Hawaiian or Pacific Islander alone (NH)	418	2	11	4	5.61%	0.02%	0.13%	0.05%
Other race alone (NH)	9	17	21	24	9	0.20%	0.25%	0.30%
Mixed race or Multiracial (NH)	x	143	174	410	x	1.71%	2.10%	5.11%
Hispanic or Latino (any race)	313	386	533	651	4.20%	4.61%	6.44%	8.11%
Total	7,455	8,368	8,270	8,029	100.00%	100.00%	100.00%	100.00%

=== 2020 census ===
As of the 2020 census, Westlake Village had a population of 8,029 and a population density of 1,547.9 inhabitants per square mile (597.6/km^{2}). The age distribution was 18.0% under the age of 18, 7.3% aged 18 to 24, 15.2% aged 25 to 44, 31.5% aged 45 to 64, and 28.0% aged 65 or older. The median age was 51.9 years. For every 100 females there were 92.1 males, and for every 100 females age 18 and over there were 89.9 males age 18 and over.

The racial makeup was 79.9% White, 0.9% African American, 0.2% Native American, 7.7% Asian, 0.1% Pacific Islander, 1.6% from other races, and 9.7% from two or more races. Hispanic or Latino of any race were 8.1% of the population.

The census reported that 99.7% of the population lived in households and 0.3% lived in non-institutionalized group quarters, while no one was institutionalized. 95.6% of residents lived in urban areas, while 4.4% lived in rural areas.

There were 3,264 households, of which 27.0% had children under the age of 18 living in them. Of all households, 59.2% were married-couple households, 3.6% were cohabiting couple households, 24.7% had a female householder with no spouse or partner present, and 12.5% had a male householder with no spouse or partner present. About 21.4% of all households were one-person households, and 13.2% had one person aged 65 or older. The average household size was 2.45. There were 2,394 families (73.3% of all households).

There were 3,438 housing units at an average density of 662.8 units per square mile (255.9 units/km^{2}), of which 3,264 (94.9%) were occupied. Of occupied units, 80.9% were owner-occupied and 19.1% were occupied by renters. The homeowner vacancy rate was 1.0%, and the rental vacancy rate was 4.8%.

=== Income and poverty ===
In 2023, the US Census Bureau estimated that the median household income was $174,069, and the per capita income was $95,373. About 5.7% of families and 6.4% of the population were below the poverty line.

=== 2010 census ===
The 2010 United States census reported that the self-incorporated portion of Westlake Village, on the Los Angeles County side, had a population of 8,270. The population density was 1,502.4 inhabitants per square mile (580.1/km^{2}). The racial makeup of Westlake Village was 7,326 (88.6%) white (83.9% non-Hispanic white), 98 (1.2%) African American, 12 (0.1%) Native American, 490 (5.9%) Asian, 13 (0.2%) Pacific Islander, 114 (1.4%) from other races, and 217 (2.6%) from two or more races. Hispanic or Latino of any race were 533 persons (6.4%).

The Census reported that 8,142 people (98.5% of the population) lived in households, 121 (1.5%) lived in non-institutionalized group quarters, and 7 (0.1%) were institutionalized.

There were 3,262 households, out of which 971 (29.8%) had children under the age of 18 living in them, 1,985 (60.9%) were married couples living together, 292 (9.0%) had a female householder with no husband present, 119 (3.6%) had a male householder with no wife present. There were 103 (3.2%) unmarried partnerships. 712 households (21.8%) were made up of individuals, and 376 (11.5%) had someone living alone who was 65 years of age or older. The average household size was 2.50. There were 2,396 families (73.5% of all households); the average family size was 2.92.

The population was spread out, with 1,737 people (21.0%) under the age of 18, 479 people (5.8%) aged 18 to 24, 1,380 people (16.7%) aged 25 to 44, 2,917 people (35.3%) aged 45 to 64, and 1,757 people (21.2%) who were 65 years of age or older. The median age was 48.7 years. For every 100 females, there were 94.8 males. For every 100 females age 18 and over, there were 91.2 males.

There were 3,384 housing units at an average density of 614.7 per square mile (237.3/km^{2}), of which 2,745 (84.2%) were owner-occupied, and 517 (15.8%) were occupied by renters. The homeowner vacancy rate was 1.0%; the rental vacancy rate was 4.4%. 6,906 people (83.5% of the population) lived in owner-occupied housing units and 1,236 people (14.9%) lived in rental housing units.

According to the 2010 United States census, Westlake Village had a median household income of $112,083, with 3.9% of the population living below the federal poverty line.

== Economy ==
Dole Food Company was headquartered in Westlake Village. In 1994, Dole announced that it would finalize its plans to build its world headquarters on a 30-acre (120,000 m^{2}) site owned by the company, located north of the Ventura Freeway in Westlake Village. The decision had been delayed by groundwater contamination tests and reviewing of possible site plan revisions. Dole was expected to submit its plans for final approval by the Westlake Village City Council on February 9, 1994. Guitar Center, PennyMac Loan Services and Ryland Homes also have their headquarters in Westlake Village.

=== Top employers ===
According to the city's 2024 Annual Comprehensive Financial Report, the top employers in the city are:

#	Employer	# of Employees
1	Bank of America	650
2	Four Seasons Hotel	594
3	Westlake Village Inn	368
4	Oaks Christian School	320
5	Costco	316
6	Conversant (Epsilon)	225
7	Target	180
8	Realtor.com (Move Inc.)	150
9	JD Power	126
10	iPayment (Paysafe Group)	123

== Parks and recreation ==
Adjacent to Westlake Village is Santa Monica Mountains National Recreation Area, which offers nature trails for hikers, backpackers, mountain bikers, equestrians, picnickers, and campers.

Parks include:

- Berniece Bennett
- Canyon Oaks
- Foxfield
- Russell Ranch
- Three Springs
- Triunfo Creek Park
- Westlake Village Community Park
- Westlake Village Dog Park

== Government ==
In the state legislature, Westlake Village is located in California's 24th State Senate district, represented by Democrat Ben Allen, and in California's 42nd State Assembly district, represented by Democrat Jacqui Irwin. Federally, Westlake Village is located in California's 26th congressional district, which has a Cook PVI of D +8 and is represented by Democrat Julia Brownley.

As of May 2009, 1,943 (33%) of the 5,876 registered voters in Westlake Village are registered as Democrats, 2,583 (44%) as Republicans, and 1,101 (19%) declined to state a party affiliation.

The Los Angeles County Sheriff's Department operates the Malibu/Lost Hills Station in Calabasas, serving Westlake Village.

As of 1990, the Las Virgenes Municipal Water District includes Westlake Village.

== Education ==
The majority of Westlake Village in Los Angeles County is served by the Las Virgenes Unified School District (LVUSD). Residents are zoned to White Oak Elementary School in Westlake Village, Lindero Canyon Middle School in Agoura Hills, and Agoura High School in Agoura Hills.

A portion in the south is in the Santa Monica–Malibu Unified School District.

The Ventura County portion of Westlake Village, which is part of the City of Thousand Oaks, is in the Conejo Valley Unified School District.

An off-campus center of California Lutheran University is located nearby in Thousand Oaks.

== Infrastructure ==
The Las Virgenes Municipal Water District supplies potable, recycled and wastewater services to residents and businesses in Westlake Village.

== Notable people ==
- David Anderson (born 1983), wide receiver in the National Football League
- Julia Brownley (born 1952), U.S. representative
- James Caviezel (born 1968), actor
- Bob Chapek, former CEO of The Walt Disney Company
- Jimmy Clausen, Notre Dame and NFL quarterback
- Lenny Dykstra, baseball center fielder
- Wayne Gretzky (born 1961), hockey Hall of Famer
- Audley Harrison, 2000 Olympic heavyweight boxing champion from Great Britain
- Mariel Hemingway (born 1961), actress
- Hulk Hogan, pro wrestler and actor
- Cobi Jones, former Los Angeles Galaxy soccer player
- Kathryn Joosten, actress
- Scarlett Keegan
- Hayley Kiyoko
- Martin Lawrence, comedian and actor
- Mike Lieberthal, All Star and Gold Glove baseball catcher
- Jonathan Lipnicki, actor
- Heather Locklear, actress
- Maureen McCormick, actress, played Marcia Brady in the TV series The Brady Bunch
- Rod McGaughy, actor
- Joe Montana (born 1956), Hall of Fame quarterback
- Eddie Money, musician
- Alexis Neiers, television personality
- Peter Noyes, American newscaster and journalist
- Dian Parkinson, model and TV personality
- John Ratzenberger, actor, best known as postal worker Cliff Clavin from '80s sitcom Cheers
- Kim Richards, child actress and television personality on Real Housewives of Beverly Hills
- Mickey Rooney, actor
- Bas Rutten, mixed martial arts fighter and actor
- Mike Scioscia, Major League Baseball player and manager
- George C. Scott (1927–1999), actor
- Vin Scully, voice of the Los Angeles Dodgers
- Mike Seidman, NFL football player
- Will Smith, musician and actor
- Robert Stock (born 1989), MLB baseball player
- Tommy Thayer, Kiss lead guitarist
- Guillermo del Toro, film director
- Jered Weaver, former pitcher for the Los Angeles Angels
- Peter Weber, television personality
- Gary Wichard, college football player and professional sports agent
- Eric Wynalda, soccer player
- Christian Yelich, baseball player
- Robert Young (1907–1998), actor

== In popular culture ==
Westlake Village was home to Russell Ranch which was used to film Robin Hood (1922), Come On, Tarzan (1932), Buck Rogers (1939), King Rat (1965), Laredo (1965–67), Gunsmoke (1955–1975) and Bonanza (1959–1973). The Lash (1930) was also filmed at Russell Ranch, while Danger Ahead (1940) was shot on Westlake Boulevard. Baxter (GTE corporate headquarters at the time) was dubbed for a police station in the film Demolition Man (1993), while scenes from Gridiron Gang (2006) were shot at Westlake High School. Other movies filmed here include The Karate Kid (1984), American Pie (1999) and Bridesmaids (2011).

Two episodes of Charlie's Angels (1976–1981) were filmed in Westlake Village: "The Killing Kind" (1976) and "Angel in a Box" (1979).

Bonnie and Clyde (1967) features scenes from Skelton Canyon Road (Westlake Boulevard), while the TV series The F.B.I. (1965–1974) was partly filmed at The Landing.
