= Sherwood Dam =

Lake Sherwood Dam
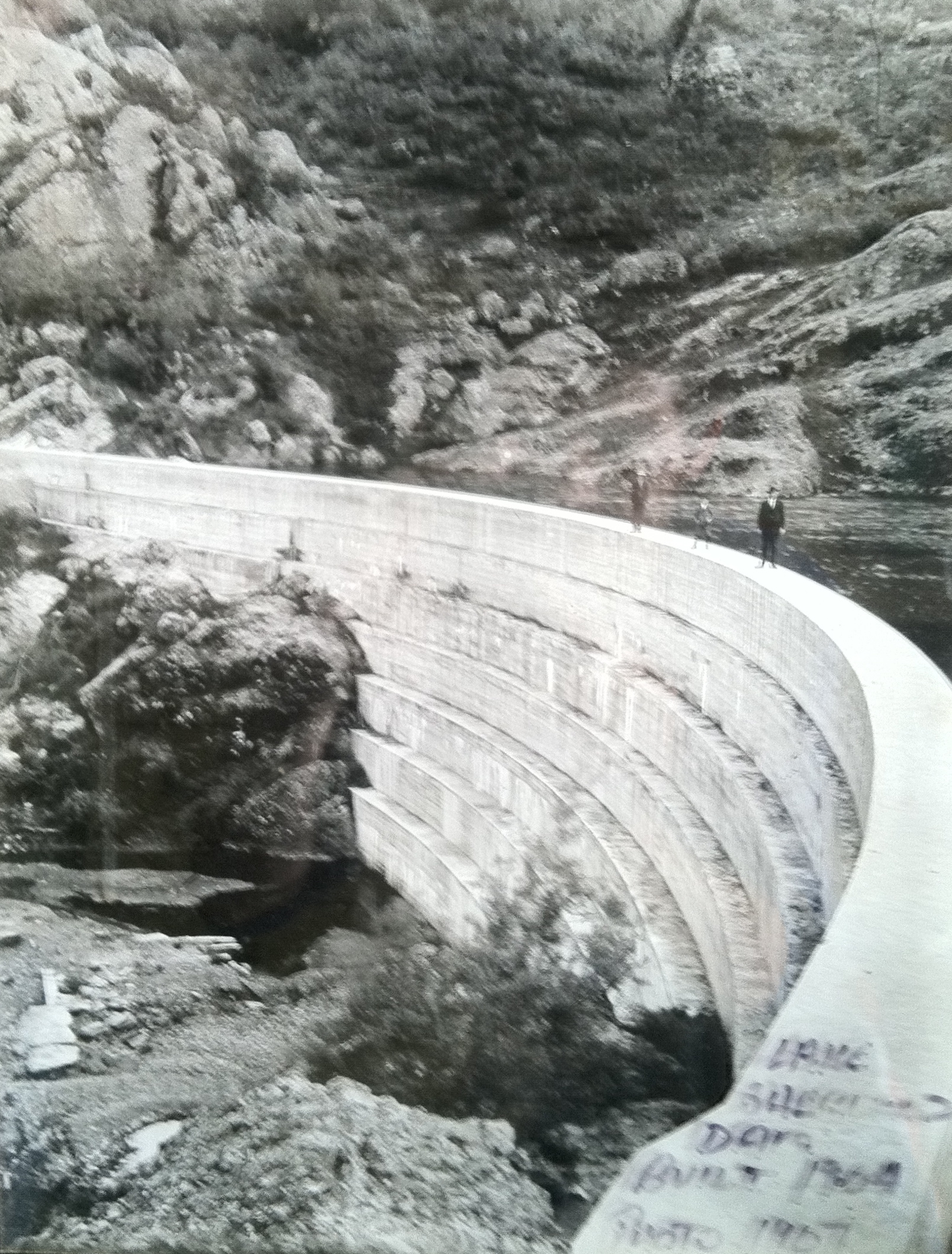
- Lake Sherwood Dam in 1907. Photograph by John Sparhawk Appleton.

- Location within California
- Country: United States
- Location: Ventura County, California
- Coordinates: 34°08′21″N 118°51′26″W
- Status: Operational
- Opening date: 1904; 122 years ago
- Construction cost: $2,000 (1904)
- Owner: Lake Sherwood Association

Dam and spillways
- Type of dam: Arch, constant-radius
- Impounds: Mishe Mokwa Creek, Potrero Valley Creek
- Height: 45 ft (14 m)
- Length: 270 ft (82 m)

Reservoir
- Creates: Lake Sherwood
- Total capacity: 2,600 acre⋅ft (3,200,000 m^{3})

Sherwood Dam, known also as Lake Sherwood Dam, Alturas Dam, and Potrero Dam, is a 270-foot-long (82 m) concrete arch dam in the Santa Monica Mountains near Thousand Oaks, California. Completed in 1904, its construction led to the creation of the 165-acre (67 ha) Potrero Lake (since renamed Lake Sherwood) over the following winter. It was the first reservoir of its size in the area, and remains one of the oldest standing dams in California.

== History ==
Construction was led by W. H. Matthiessen, a rancher who owned what is today Hidden Valley, Lake Sherwood, and Thousand Oaks. Originally called the Alturas Dam, it was built to contain the water from four main streams draining into a sixteen-mile catchment basin. Potrero Lake was formed that winter, its sudden existence attracting photographers and filmmakers alike to the newly created shores.

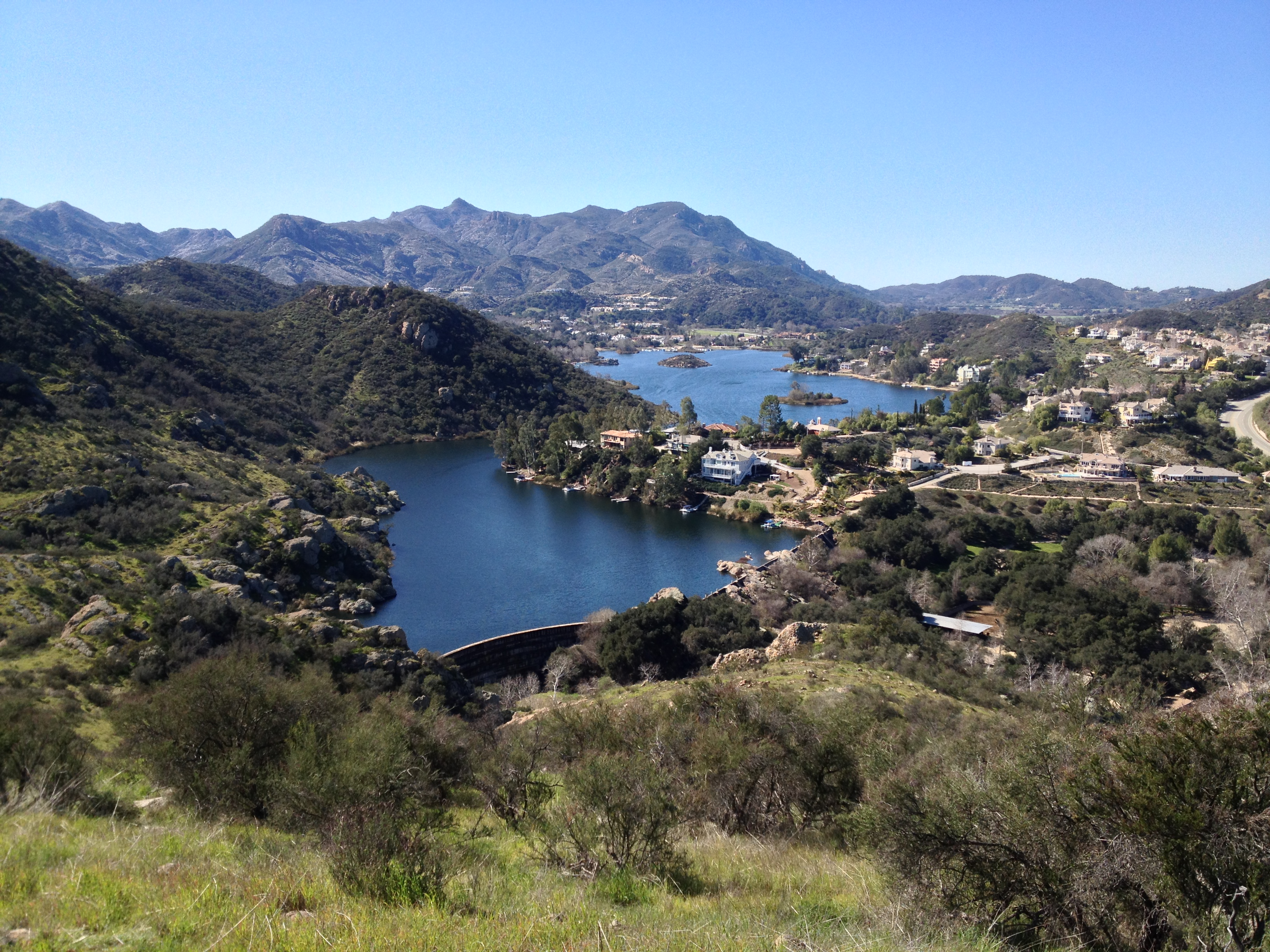
The Sherwood Dam, Lake Sherwood and surrounding community in 2013.

The reservoir also directly inspired civil engineers such as William Mulholland, who began designing the Los Angeles Aqueduct in 1905. The Malibou Lake Mountain Club built a similar dam nearby in 1922, forming Malibou Lake not long after. Matthiessen's son Christy allowed Douglas Fairbanks to shoot his film Robin Hood around his lake in 1921. As a result, the ranch became better known as “Sherwood Forest”; Potrero Lake since being known as Lake Sherwood.

Much of Matthiessen's Ranch, including the dam and lake, was deeded to his son's ex-wife, Elsie Canterbury, in 1923. That same year, the area southwest of Lake Sherwood was subdivided as Lake Sherwood (community) into 2,500 plots by Elsie and her new husband. "The idea was to offer a country club setting, lake privileges, bridle paths and the Sherwood Country Club clubhouse for the affluent people of the Roaring Twenties. " However, construction of the private community was halted by the stock market crash of 1929, and Elsie Canterbury was forced to sell the land west of the lake to William Randolph Hearst. Hearst appreciated the area's geographic beauty, which continued to occasionally appear in the films of the Golden Era of Hollywood. It is claimed a single scene from Warner Brothers’ 1938 The Adventures of Robin Hood was shot there.

After Hearst's death in 1951, the lakeside began to be developed into private homes and the community of Lake Sherwood. Elsie Canterbury stubbornly fought for her legal right to the entire lake until she sold her property in anticipation of her death in 1967. The area has since become a picturesque, private community and world-famous golf course.

Amidst safety concerns in 1984, Lake Sherwood was drained so that the dam could be inspected. To the disruption of nearby boaters, it was reinforced to remedy previously unseen structural safety problems.

Even after its reinforcement in the 1980s, the Sherwood Dam remains susceptible to 100-year floods and high-magnitude earthquakes.

== See also ==
- Banning Dam
- Lake Sherwood, California – nearby community
- List of dams and reservoirs in California
- List of lakes in California
- Rindge Dam
- Robin Hood
- The Adventures of Robin Hood (1938 film)
