= Sherwood Country Club =

Private golf club in Lake Sherwood, California, united States

Coordinates: 34°7′56″N 118°52′55″W

Sherwood Country Club is a private, member owned golf and country club in Lake Sherwood, California set at the base of the Santa Monica Mountains just south of city of Thousand Oaks. Sherwood is home to a championship 18-hole Jack Nicklaus signature golf course, driving range and Georgian architecture golf clubhouse. Adjacent to the golf club is the tennis clubhouse, swimming pool, gymnasium, fitness facility and spa. There are a total of 12 tennis courts, including 8 hard courts (one with stadium seating), two clay courts and two grass courts. The tennis club also includes an outside sand volleyball court, all of which can be lit for night play.

Sherwood was the host of multiple off-season events. It hosted the Shark Shootout, a team-play event hosted by Australian great Greg Norman, from the event's inception in 1989 to 1999. It then hosted the World Challenge, a PGA Tour-recognized golf tournament hosted by Tiger Woods each December, from 2000 to 2013.

Sherwood was also the site of the Showdown at Sherwood, the first ever prime-time live golf match, which was played between Tiger Woods and David Duval in 1999.

In 2016, Sherwood became the host of the Champions Tour event, the PowerShares QQQ Championship.

In 2020, Sherwood hosted the Zozo Championship.

The course was featured in Tiger Woods PGA Tour 2005.

== History ==
Lake Sherwood, originally Potrero Lake, is the oldest man-made lake in California. It was built in 1904 and is approximately 165 acres (0.67 km^{2}). It was changed to Lake Sherwood when the surrounding areas, used for the filming of "Robin Hood" starring Douglas Fairbanks, Sr., in 1921, became known as "Sherwood Forest" and "Maid Marian Park."

The golf course was formally opened on October 30, 1989.

A number of movies and TV-series have been shot here, including scenes for The Mentalist and The Birth of a Nation. The engagement party in the film Bridesmaids (2011) was also filmed at Sherwood Country Club.

== Membership ==
Sherwood's membership is approximately 375 golf members/owners and is by invitation or member referral. The adjacent tennis club has fourteen courts in hard, clay and grass surfaces, a swimming pool, gymnasium, fitness center, dining room and pub, men's and ladies' locker rooms and a full-service spa. The tennis club maintains a membership of approximately 175 members.

Notable members of the club have included Sean Connery, Kenny G, Mel Gibson, Caitlyn Jenner, Wayne Gretzky, Scott Hamilton, Kevin James, Tom Kelly, Angelo Mozilo, Craig T. Nelson, Jack Nicholson, Joe Pesci, Tom Selleck, Jane Seymour, O. J. Simpson, Will Smith, Kevin Sorbo, Sylvester Stallone, and Justin Timberlake.

== Golf course ==
Fairways: Bentgrass
Greens: Bentgrass, Poa annua
Rough: Ryegrass
Par: 72
Course Record: 61, by Dustin Johnson on October 28, 2014

In 2009, Sherwood underwent a major bunker restoration using a new drainage system called Sportscrete.

Sherwood Golf Course has several protected areas, including an oak savanna. Two other protected areas are believed to have populations of endangered sunflower Lyon’s Pentachaeta (Pentachaeta lyonii).
