= Lake Sherwood, California =

- Unincorporated community Census-designated place
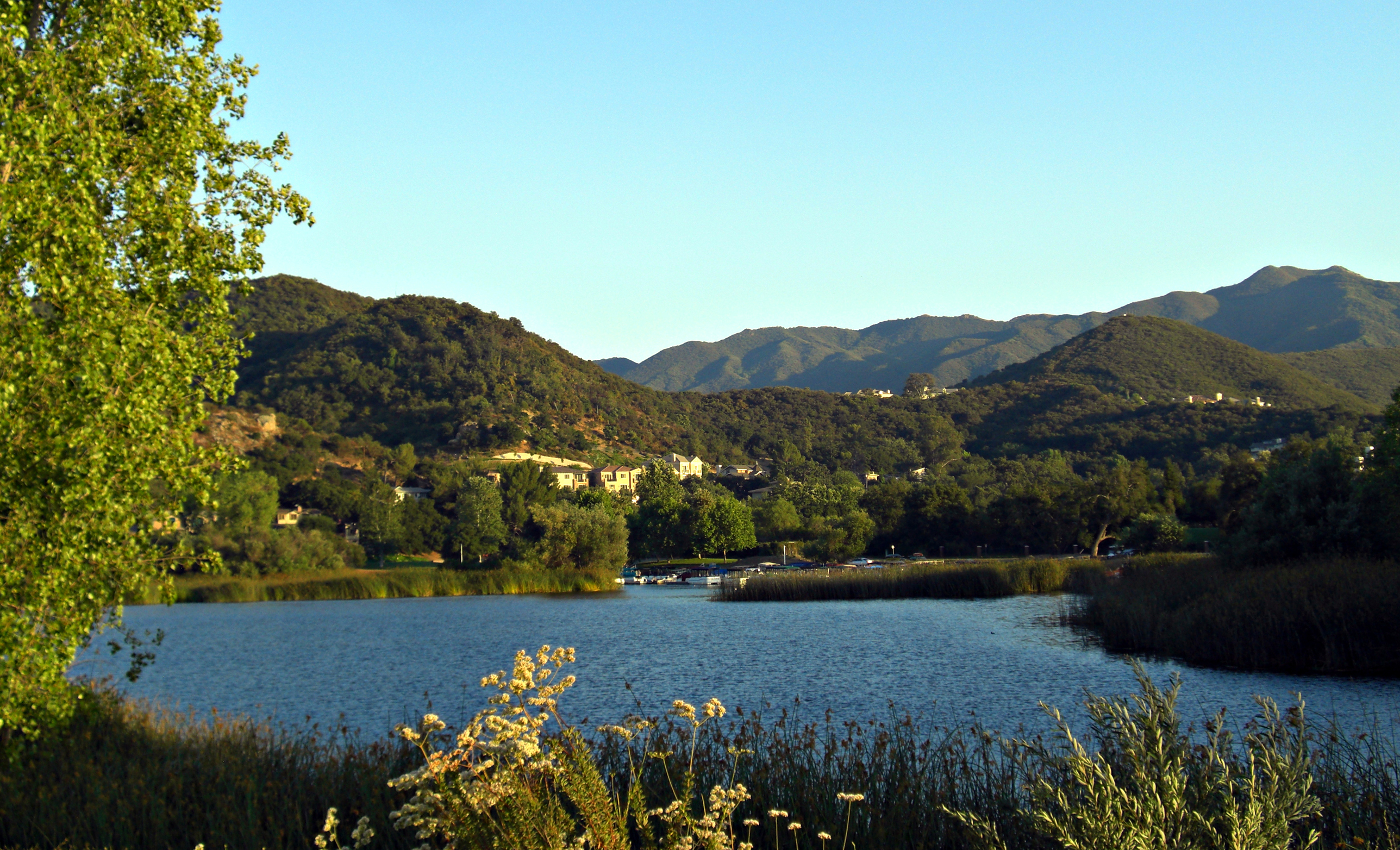
- Lake Sherwood and the Santa Monica Mountains

- Location of Lake Sherwood in Ventura County, California.

- Location within the state of California Lake Sherwood, California (the United States)
- Coordinates: 34°07′34″N 118°53′17″W
- Country: United States
- State: California
- County: Ventura

Area
  - Total: 3.349 sq mi (8.674 km^{2})
  - Land: 3.137 sq mi (8.126 km^{2})
  - Water: 0.212 sq mi (0.548 km^{2}) 6.32%
- Elevation: 1,194 ft (364 m)

Population (2020)
  - Total: 1,759
  - Density: 560.6/sq mi (216.5/km^{2})
- Time zone: UTC-8 (Pacific (PST))
  - Summer (DST): UTC-7 (PDT)
- ZIP codes: 91361
- Area code: 805
- FIPS code: 06-39735
- GNIS feature ID: 2585428

Lake Sherwood is an unincorporated community in the Santa Monica Mountains, in Ventura County, California, United States, overlooking Lake Sherwood reservoir. It is a body contact lake (swimming, fishing, standup paddleboarding (SUP), and boating are allowed), located south of the Conejo Valley and city of Thousand Oaks, and west of Westlake Village. The lake is naturally fed by thousands of acres of open-space, watershed mountains and natural springs.

While homes have been around the lake since the reservoir was created by the construction of Sherwood Dam in 1901, the community expanded with the development of the Sherwood Country Club golf course surrounded by luxury homes.

The ZIP Code is 91361, and the community is inside area code 805. The population was 1,759 at the 2020 census. For statistical purposes, the United States Census Bureau has defined Lake Sherwood as a census-designated place (CDP). The census definition of the area may not precisely correspond to local understanding of the area with the same name.

== Geography ==
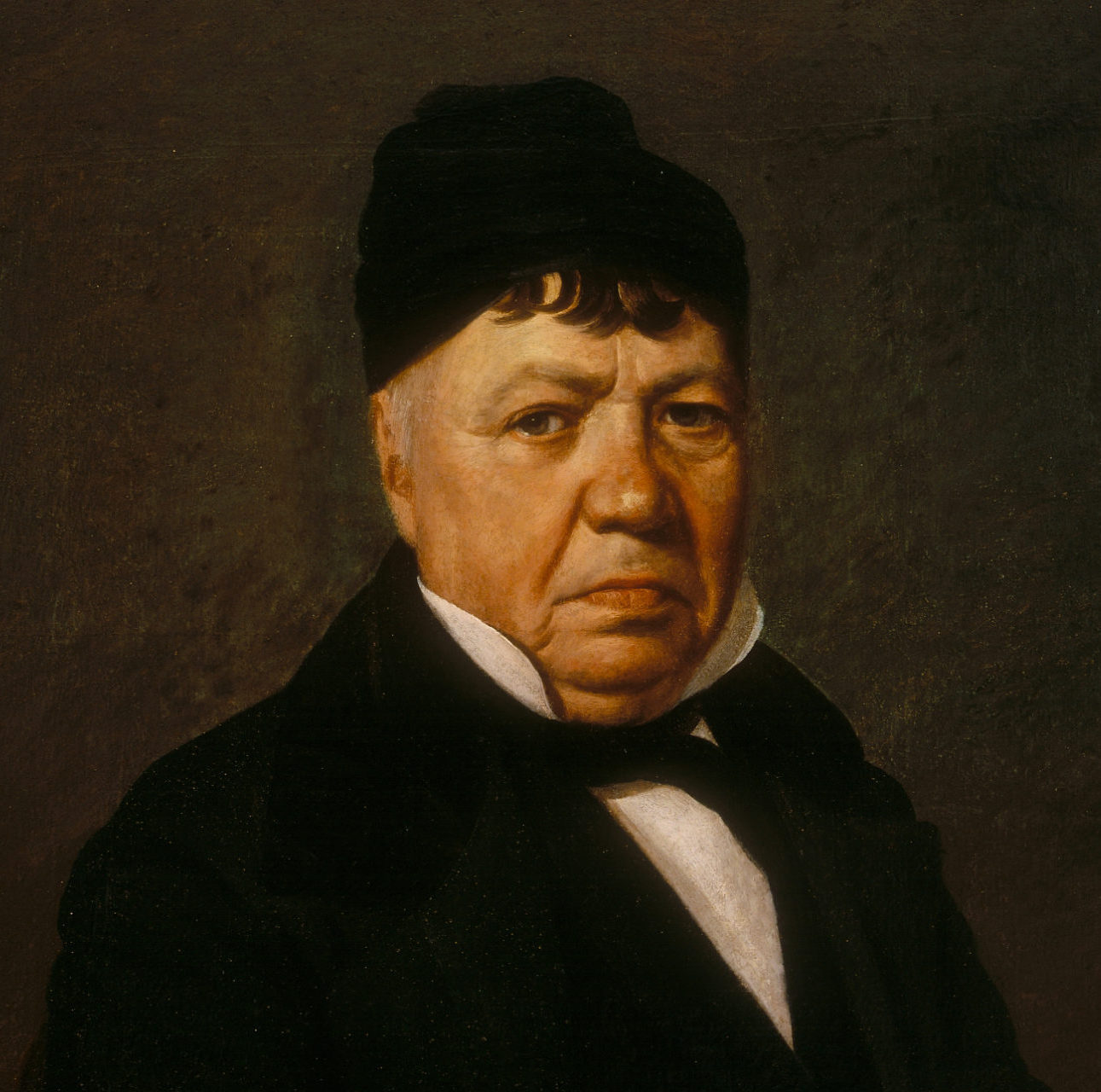
Lake Sherwood was part of Rancho El Conejo, owned by Don José de la Guerra y Noriega, founder of the prominent Guerra family of California.

According to the United States Census Bureau, the CDP covers an area of 3.3 square miles (8.7 km^{2}), of which 3.1 square miles (8.1 km^{2}) is land and 0.2 square mile (0.5 km^{2}) (6.32%) is water.

=== Physical character ===
Lake Sherwood has approximately 660 residences and consists of a guard-gated golf-club community, three electronic-gated communities, and lake-view homes along Lake Sherwood Drive. The area is almost completely residential, most residents using neighboring Thousand Oaks, Westlake Village, or Agoura Hills for commercial needs.

== Demographics ==
Historical population
Census	Pop.	Note	%±
2010	1,527		—
2020	1,759		15.2%
U.S. Decennial Census; 1850–1870 1880-1890; 1900 1910 1920; 1930 1940 1950; 1960 1970 1980; 1990 2000 2010

Lake Sherwood first appeared as a census designated place in the 2010 U.S. census.

=== 2020 census ===
As of the 2020 census, Lake Sherwood had a population of 1,759, with a population density of 560.7 inhabitants per square mile (216.5/km^{2}). 83.8% of residents lived in urban areas, while 16.2% lived in rural areas.

The whole population lived in households. There were 662 households, out of which 163 (24.6%) had children under the age of 18 living in them, 446 (67.4%) were married-couple households, 25 (3.8%) were cohabiting couple households, 107 (16.2%) had a female householder with no spouse or partner present, and 84 (12.7%) had a male householder with no spouse or partner present. 116 households (17.5%) were one person, and 57 (8.6%) were one person aged 65 or older. The average household size was 2.66. There were 517 families (78.1% of all households).

The age distribution was 315 people (17.9%) under the age of 18, 162 people (9.2%) aged 18 to 24, 232 people (13.2%) aged 25 to 44, 599 people (34.1%) aged 45 to 64, and 451 people (25.6%) who were 65 years of age or older. The median age was 52.4 years. For every 100 females, there were 102.2 males. For every 100 females age 18 and over, there were 102.2 males age 18 and over.

There were 706 housing units at an average density of 225.1 units per square mile (86.9 units/km^{2}), of which 662 (93.8%) were occupied and 44 (6.2%) were vacant. Of occupied units, 580 (87.6%) were owner-occupied and 82 (12.4%) were occupied by renters. The homeowner vacancy rate was 1.3% and the rental vacancy rate was 9.7%.

Racial composition as of the 2020 census
Race	Number	Percent
White	1,432	81.4%
Black or African American	5	0.3%
American Indian and Alaska Native	4	0.2%
Asian	143	8.1%
Native Hawaiian and Other Pacific Islander	1	0.1%
Some other race	33	1.9%
Two or more races	141	8.0%
Hispanic or Latino (of any race)	121	6.9%

== Education ==
The area is served by the Conejo Valley Unified School District. Students attend Westlake Elementary, Colina Middle School, and Westlake High School.

== Notable people ==
Among the notable residents are hockey great Wayne Gretzky, who lived in a Georgian-style estate designed by fellow Canadian, Richard Landry. Gretzky sold the estate in 2007 for 18.5 million to another sports-star, baseball's Lenny Dykstra and moved to a slightly less extravagant mansion in the community. Since then, Dykstra's financial and legal problems forced him to sell the estate to a private individual and move away from the community. Dykstra declared bankruptcy, causing him to lose the property to foreclosure and in 2018 Gretzky repurchased the same property that he previously sold to Dykstra. Singer Paul Anka moved to Lake Sherwood in 2007 and owns multiple properties in the exclusive neighborhood. Tom Petty lived in a lakefront retreat that was originally built in 1931. Producer/Author/Journalist Larry Garrison resides with his wife. The tennis legend Pete Sampras and his wife, actress Bridgette Wilson, built a very large, modern, hilltop estate they have since moved from the house. Britney Spears moved to the community in 2011 but recently moved into nearby Hidden Valley. Many other famous inhabitants own property in the community, however, they are only part-time residents and use their estates as a second home or as a retreat. Sylvester Stallone owned a lakefront hideaway that was featured in the film American Pie. Also, William Randolph Hearst, who was one of the first famous residents in the area and owned property around the lake, used his estate as a vacation getaway during the 1920s and 1930s.

== Motion picture and television location ==
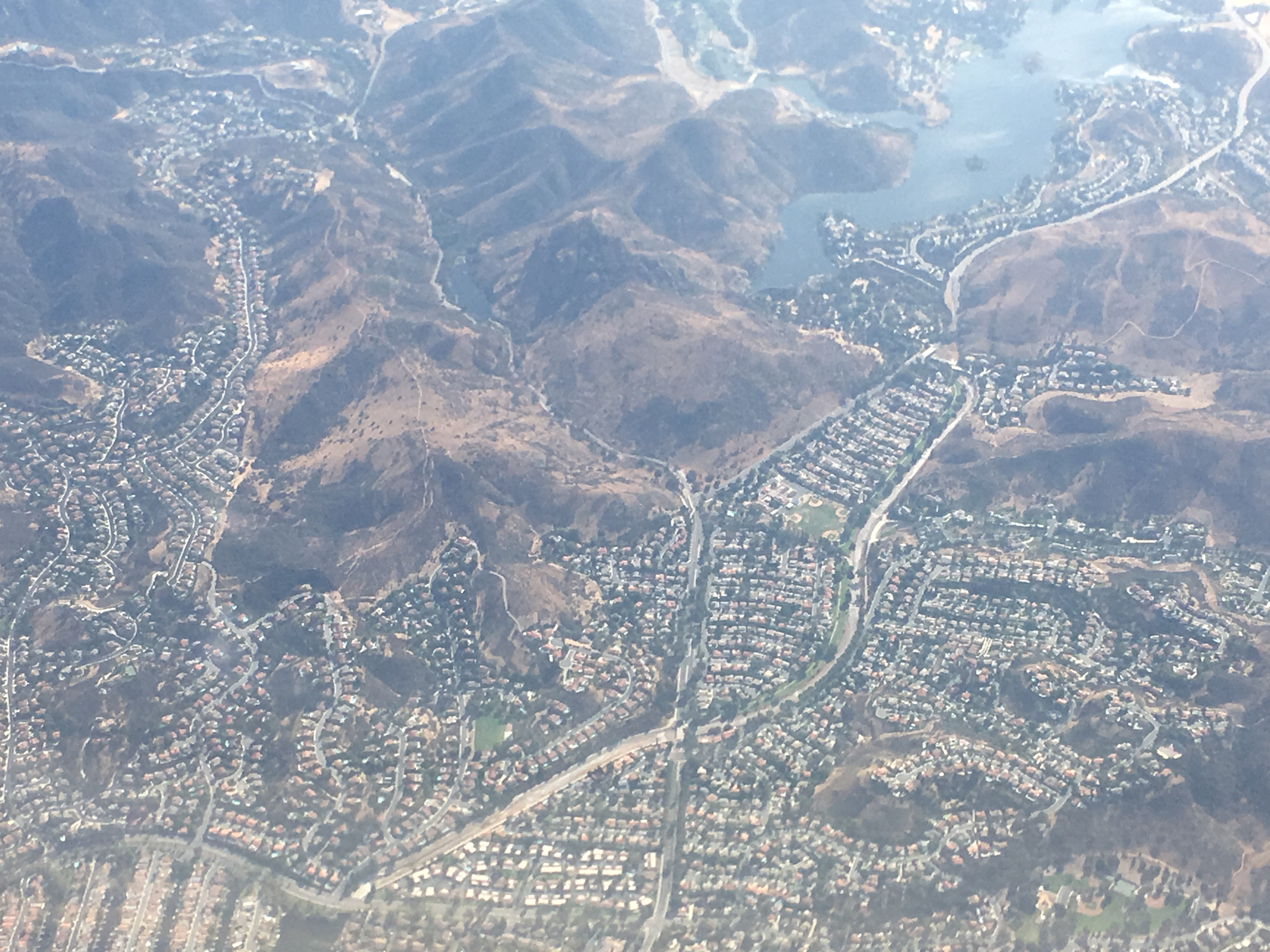
Lake Sherwood and Portero Rd. from Thousand Oaks

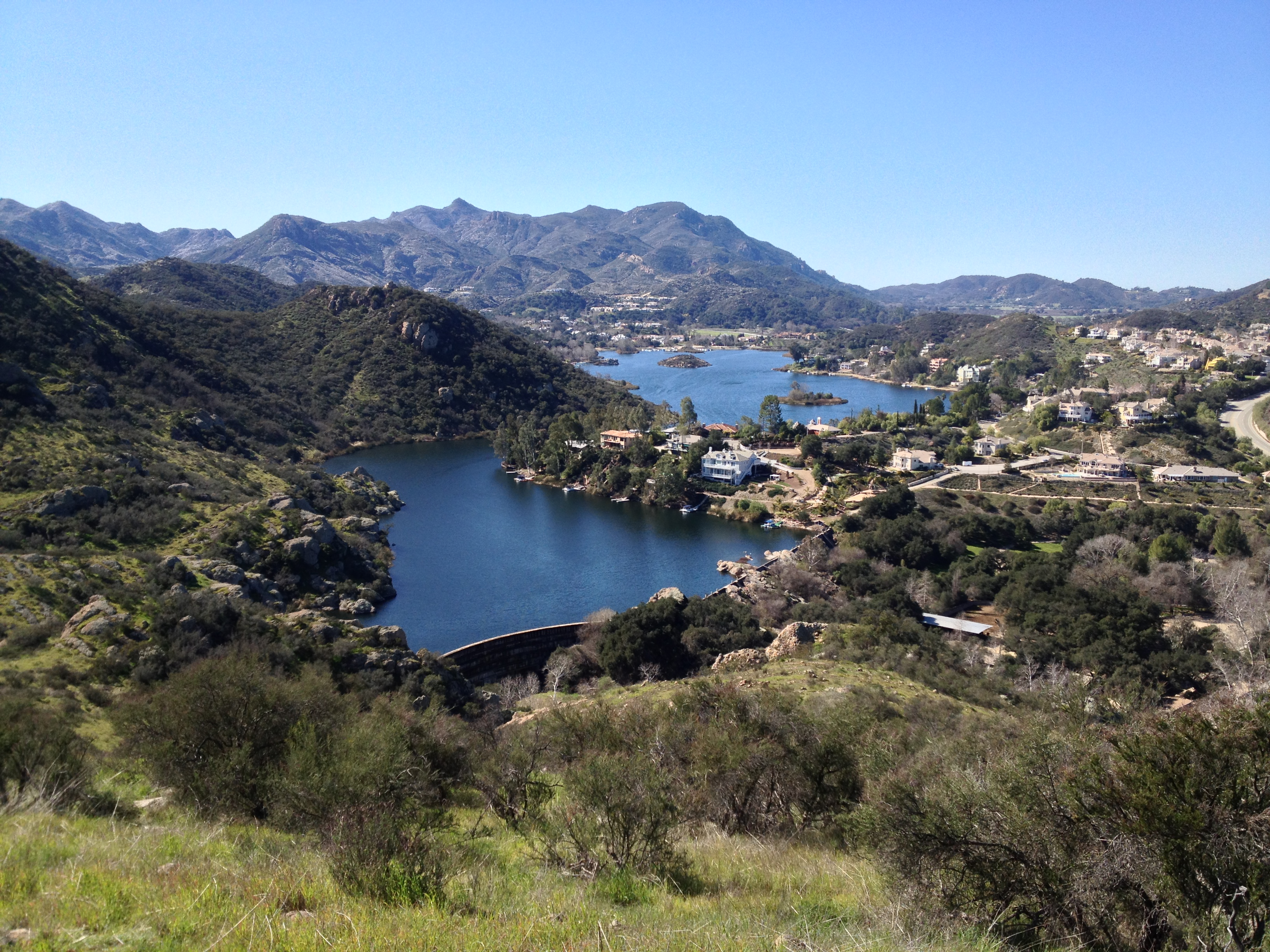
Sherwood Dam, Lake Sherwood, and surrounding community

Lake Sherwood lies just west of several major movie ranches and has frequently been used as a filming location for television shows such as The Dukes of Hazzard, The Rockford Files, and Little House on the Prairie.

Lake Sherwood was named from being the location for Sherwood Forest in the 1922 film, Robin Hood, starring Douglas Fairbanks. The 1938 film, The Adventures of Robin Hood, starring Errol Flynn, also had a single scene shot on location at "Sherwood Forest".

A mock cliff was constructed for several film serials, the lake was often used for motorboat chases and bordering forests were used for Tarzan and Jungle Jim films, and The Tiger Woman. A full scale Tibetan village was built for Lost Horizon, an Italian village for Blake Edwards's What Did You Do in the War, Daddy? (1966) and an alien village for Jonathan Frakes's Star Trek: Insurrection (1998).

=== Filmography ===
Films shot in Lake Sherwood include:

- Robin Hood (1922)
- The Long, Long Trail (1929)
- The Apache Kid's Escape (1930)
- The Fighting Legion (1930)
- Frankenstein (1931)
- The Great Meadow (1931)
- The Nevada Buckaroo (1931)
- The Squaw Man (1931)
- Tarzan the Ape Man (1932)
- The Boiling Point (1932)
- Destry Rides Again (1932)
- The Gay Buckaroo (1932)
- Honor of the Mounted (1932)
- The Last of the Mohicans (1932)
- The Man from Hell's Edges (1932)
- Crossfire (1933)
- Deadwood Pass (1933)
- Tarzan the Fearless (1933)
- Galloping Romeo (1933)
- The Red Rider (1934)
- Tarzan and His Mate (1934)
- Thunder Mountain (1935)
- The Cowboy and the Kid (1936)
- The Last of the Mohicans (1936)
- Lost Horizon (1937)
- The Devil's Saddle Legion (1937)
- Way Out West (1937)
- The Adventures of Robin Hood (1938)
- Billy the Kid Returns (1938)
- The Last Stand (1938)
- The Painted Trail (1938)
- Allegheny Uprising (1939)
- Tarzan Finds a Son! (1939)
- Desperate Trails (1939)
- Adventures of Red Ryder (1940)
- Dark Command (1940)
- Hidden Gold (1940)
- The Man from Dakota (1940)
- The Ranger and the Lady (1940)
- Virginia City (1940)
- Belle Starr (1941)
- Jungle Girl (1941)
- King of the Texas Rangers (1941)
- Romance on the Range (1942)
- The Jungle Book (1942)
- Silver Spurs (1943)
- Wagon Tracks West (1943)
- Tarzan Triumphs (1943)
- The Tiger Woman (1944)
- The Cisco Kid Returns (1945)
- Red River Renegades (1946)
- The Man from Texas (1947)
- On the Spanish Trail (1947)
- Redwood Forest Trail (1950)
- Three Hours to Kill (1954)
- Old Yeller (1958)
- What Did You Do in the War, Daddy? (1966)
- Butch Cassidy and the Sundance Kid (1969)
- Tell Them Willie Boy Is Here (1970)
- Another Man, Another Woman (1977)
- Doctor Dolittle (1998)
- Star Trek: Insurrection (1998)
- Bridesmaids (2011)

== See also ==
- Sherwood Dam
- Santa Monica Mountains National Recreation Area
