= Albany, New Providence =

Luxury resort in The Bahamas

Coordinates: 25.003727°N 77.508579°W

Albany is a luxury resort community on the island of New Providence in the Bahamas, which opened October 2010. Tavistock Group, Tiger Woods, and Ernie Els created the community on approximately 600 acres (240 ha) on the oceanfront at the southwestern end of the island. Albany has an Els-designed 18-hole championship golf course, a luxury boutique hotel, a family water park, an adult pool, a spa and fitness center, a children's clubhouse, a variety of restaurants and bars, and a 71-slip mega-yacht marina.

Albany is named after a historic pink Bahamian colonial mansion called Albany House, which was formerly owned by French film maker Jean Chalopin, the creator of the animated television series Inspector Gadget.

Albany House was a filming location for the villain Dimitrios' beachfront home in the 2006 James Bond movie Casino Royale.

Many top professional golfers are members of Albany, including Els, Woods, Tim Clark, Trevor Immelman, Ian Poulter, Adam Scott and Justin Rose. Along with golfers, Albany has many singers and actors, including: Justin Timberlake, Will Smith, and Kate Hudson. From 2021 until its collapse in 2022, FTX CEO Sam Bankman-Fried lived in a penthouse apartment in Albany with nine colleagues.

In 2018, Forbes called Albany "one of the most exclusive resorts in the world".
