= Westlake Lake =

Lake in the state of California, United States

- Interactive map of Westlake Lake
- Location: Westlake Village, California; Thousand Oaks, California
- Coordinates: 34.142926950536°N 118.824426265824°W
- Type: Artificial lake
- Built: 1969
- Shore length^{1}: 8 miles (13 km)
- ^{1} Shore length is not a well-defined measure.

Westlake Lake is a private 125-acre artificial lake (51 ha) with 8 miles (13 km) of shoreline in the Conejo Valley in Southern California. The boundary between the cities of Westlake Village and Thousand Oaks crosses the lake. It was built in 1969. Over 1,300 houses are located either on or within access of the lake. A number of houses are located on an island inside the lake that is connected by La Venta Drive. The lake is stocked with bass but fishing and boating is restricted to Westlake Village residents with guests and permits. The lake is the namesake of Westlake Village. The Westlake Yacht Club teaches people of all ages how to sail in the lake. At the end of the lake there is a rabbit sculpture named Cottonsail. It is one of 17 similar sculptures around Conejo Valley. Orange mussels live in the lake and taking them is restricted. Westlake Lake is one of the largest lakes in Thousand Oaks.
